= Chip of the Flying U =

Chip of the Flying U may refer to:

== Literature ==
- Chip of the Flying U (novel), a 1904 Western novel by B.M. Bower

== Film ==
- Chip of the Flying U (1914 film), a 1914 short silent film directed by Colin Campbell and based on Bower's novel
- Chip of the Flying U (1926 film), a 1926 silent film directed by Lynn Reynolds and based on Bower's novel
- Chip of the Flying U (1939 film), a 1939 film directed by Ralph Staub and based on Bower's novel
