= The Ne'er-Do-Well (1916 film) =

1916 American silent film by Colin Campbell

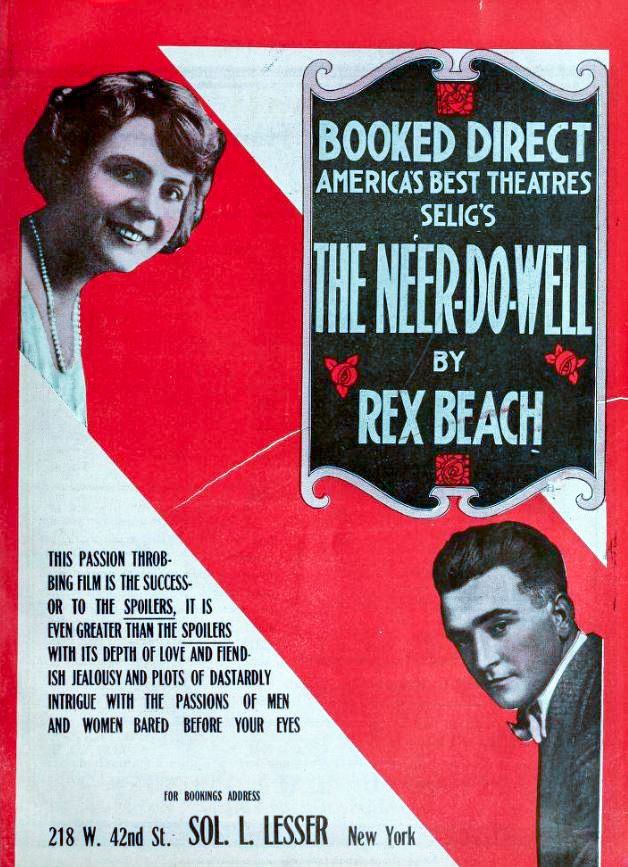
- Advertisement
- Directed by: Colin Campbell
- Written by: Lanier Bartlett (scenario)
- Based on: The Ne'er-Do-Well by Rex Beach
- Produced by: William Nicholas Selig
- Starring: Wheeler Oakman; Kathlyn Williams; Harry Lonsdale; Frank Clark; Norma Nichols
- Cinematography: Harry W. Gerstad
- Production company: Selig Polyscope Company
- Distributed by: V-L-S-E, Incorporated
- Release date: March 20, 1916
- Running time: 100 minutes
- Country: United States
- Languages: Silent film (English intertitles)

The Ne'er-Do-Well is a 1916 American silent adventure crime drama film directed by Colin Campbell, and starring Wheeler Oakman, Kathlyn Williams, Harry Lonsdale, Frank Clark, and Norma Nichols. It is based on the 1911 novel of the same name by Rex Beach. The film opened in Los Angeles in December 1915, and was released by V-L-S-E on March 20, 1916.

Another film adaptation was later released in 1923, in which Sidney Smith reprised the role as he did in the 1916 version.

== Cast ==
- Wheeler Oakman as Kirk Anthony, the Ne'er-Do-Well
- Kathlyn Williams as Mrs. Edith Cortlandt, a Diplomat
- Harry Lonsdale as Stephen Cortlandt, Her Husband
- Frank Clark as Darwin K. Anthony, Railroad Magnate
- Norma Nichols as Chiquita Garavel, A Spanish Maiden
- Will Machin as Weller, alias Locke
- Jack McDonald as Allan Allan, an English Subject
- Sidney Smith as Ramon Alfarez, Commondant of Police
- Fred Huntley as Andres Garavel
- Lamar Johnstone as Runnels
- Harry De Vere as Detective Williams

== Preservation ==
A print of The Ne'er-Do-Well is in the collection of the Library of Congress.
