= Gilson Willets =

American screenwriter

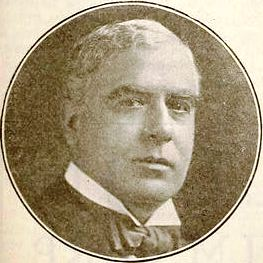
- Born: August 10, 1869; Hempstead, New York, U.S.
- Died: May 26, 1922 (aged 52); Los Angeles, California, U.S.
- Occupations: Author; Journalist; Screenwriter

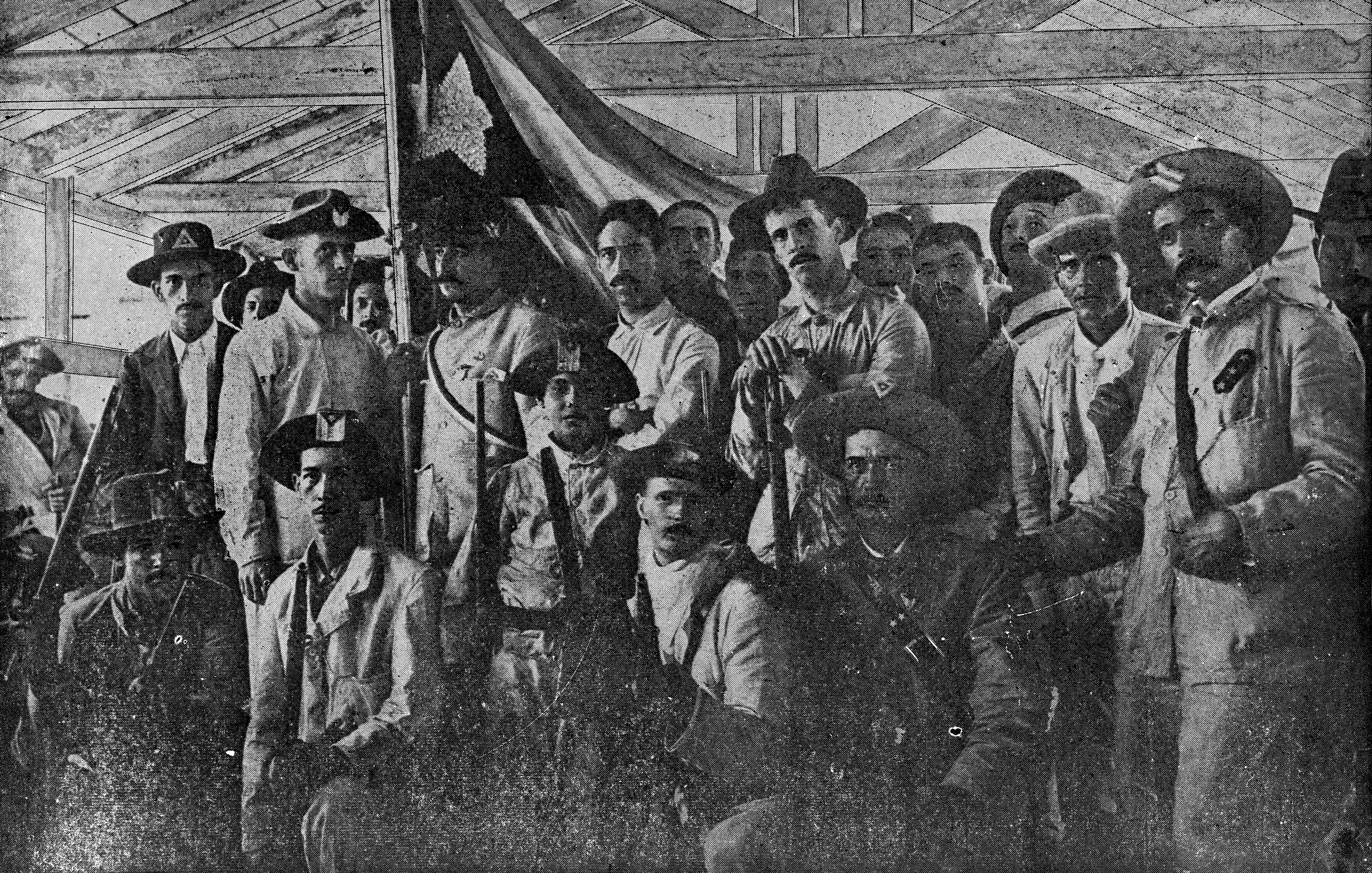
Volunteers for the Spanish–American War including many Cuban cigar workers from Tampa, Florida in 1898

Gilson Willets (August 10, 1869 - 1922) was a journalist, author, and screenwriter in the United States. He was born in Hempstead, New York. He wrote for Leslie's Weekly, Collier's Weekly and many other publications. He covered the Spanish–American War in Cuba. He traveled widely before becoming a production manager for Pathé. His work includes several film serials.

As a journalist, he covered a plague in India and E. H. Harriman's Harriman Scientific Expedition to Alaska. He was described as the American Guy de Maupassant for his terse writing style.

He wrote about New Mexico in 1905.

He married Daisy Van Der Veer and his son was named Gilson Vander Veer Willets.

== Bibliography ==
- His Neighbor's Wife
- Anita, Cuban Spy
- The Triumph of Yankee Doodle
- Workers of the Nation
- The Commercial Invasion of Europe
- Inside History of the White House
- Rulers of the World at Home
- The Loves of Twenty and One (1899)
- Myster of the Double Cross

== Filmography ==
- The Adventures of Kathlyn (1913), a serial co-written with Harold MacGrath
- The Adventures of Ruth (1919), serial
- Little Orphant Annie (1918 film)
- The Mystery of the Double Cross (1917)
- The City of Purple Dreams (1918 film), an adaptation of an Edwin Baird novel
- The Tiger's Trail (1919), an adaptation of a story by Arthur B. Reeve
- The Garden of Allah (1916 film), an adaptation of a Robert Hichens novel
- Hands Up (serial) (1918)
- The Bells (1918 film)
- A Black Sheep (1915)
- The Heart of Texas Ryan (1917)
- The Princess of Patches (1917)
- Sweet Alyssum (film), film adaptation
- A Change of Administration
- The House of a Thousand Candles (1915 film)
- In the Days of the Thundering Herd
- Who Shall Take My Life?
- Ruth of the Range
- Beware of Strangers
