= An Assisted Elopement (1912 Selig film) =

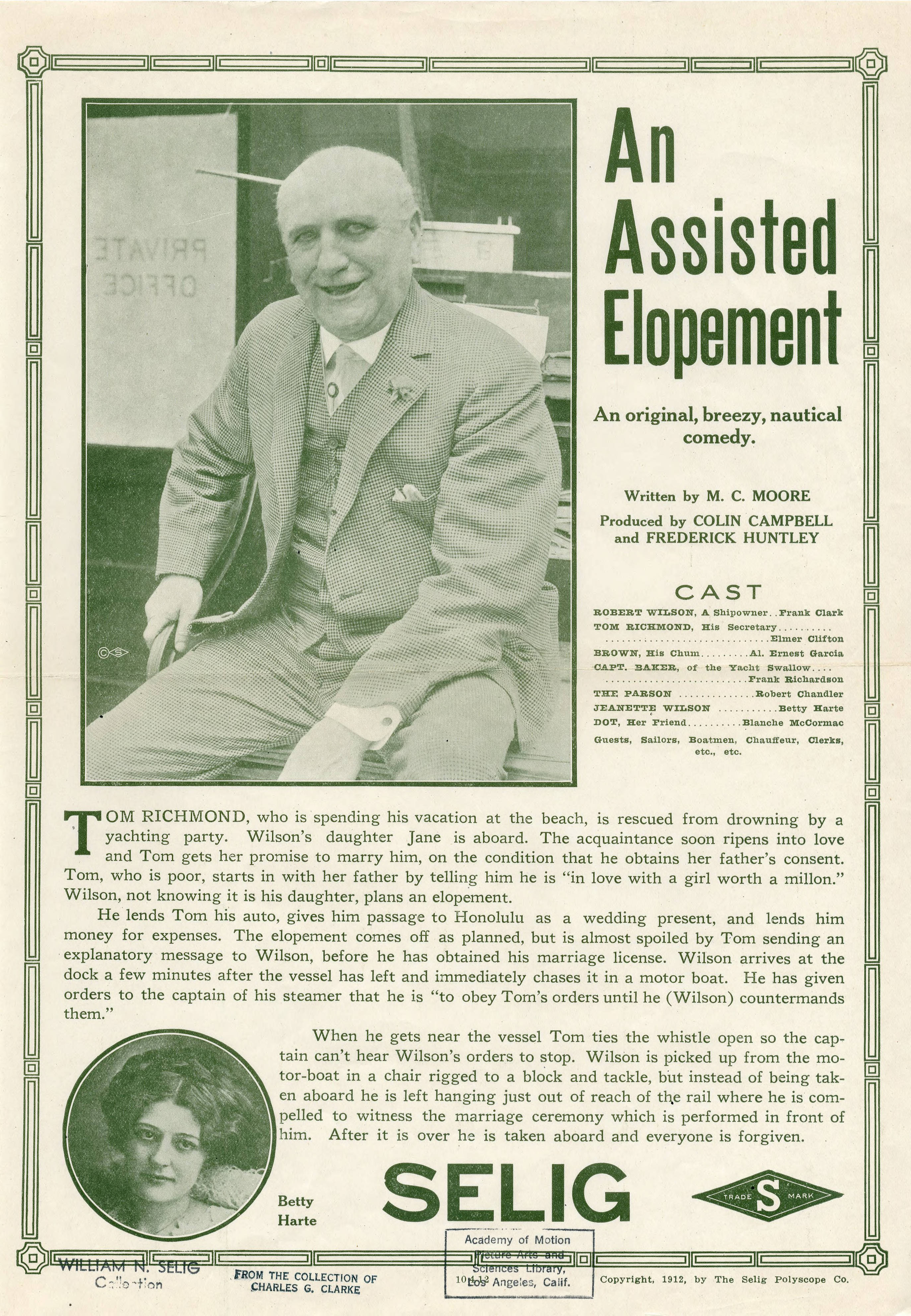
- Directed by: Colin Campbell
- Written by: Fred Huntley
- Produced by: Selig Polyscope Company; William Nicholas Selig
- Starring: Frank Clark; Elmer Clifton
- Distributed by: General Film Company
- Release date: October 4, 1912
- Running time: 1 reel
- Country: USA
- Language: Silent with English titles

An Assisted Elopement is a 1912 silent film short directed by Colin Campbell. It was produced by Selig Polyscope Company. The film is preserved in the Library of Congress collection.

== Cast ==
- Frank Clark - Old Robert Wilson (*billed Frank M. Clark)
- Elmer Clifton - Young Tom Richmond
- Betty Harte - Jeanette Wilson
- Al Ernest Garcia - Brown, Tom's Friend (*as Al E. Garcia)
- Frank Richardson - Captain Baker
- James Robert Chandler - The Parson (*as Robert Chandler)
- Blanche McCormick - Dot, Jeanette's friend
