= In the Long Ago =

- Directed by: Colin Campbell
- Written by: Lanier Bartlett
- Produced by: Selig Polyscope; William Nicholas Selig
- Starring: Wheeler Oakman; Bessie Eyton
- Distributed by: General Film Company
- Release date: May 15, 1913
- Running time: 1 reel
- Country: USA
- Language: Silent..English titles

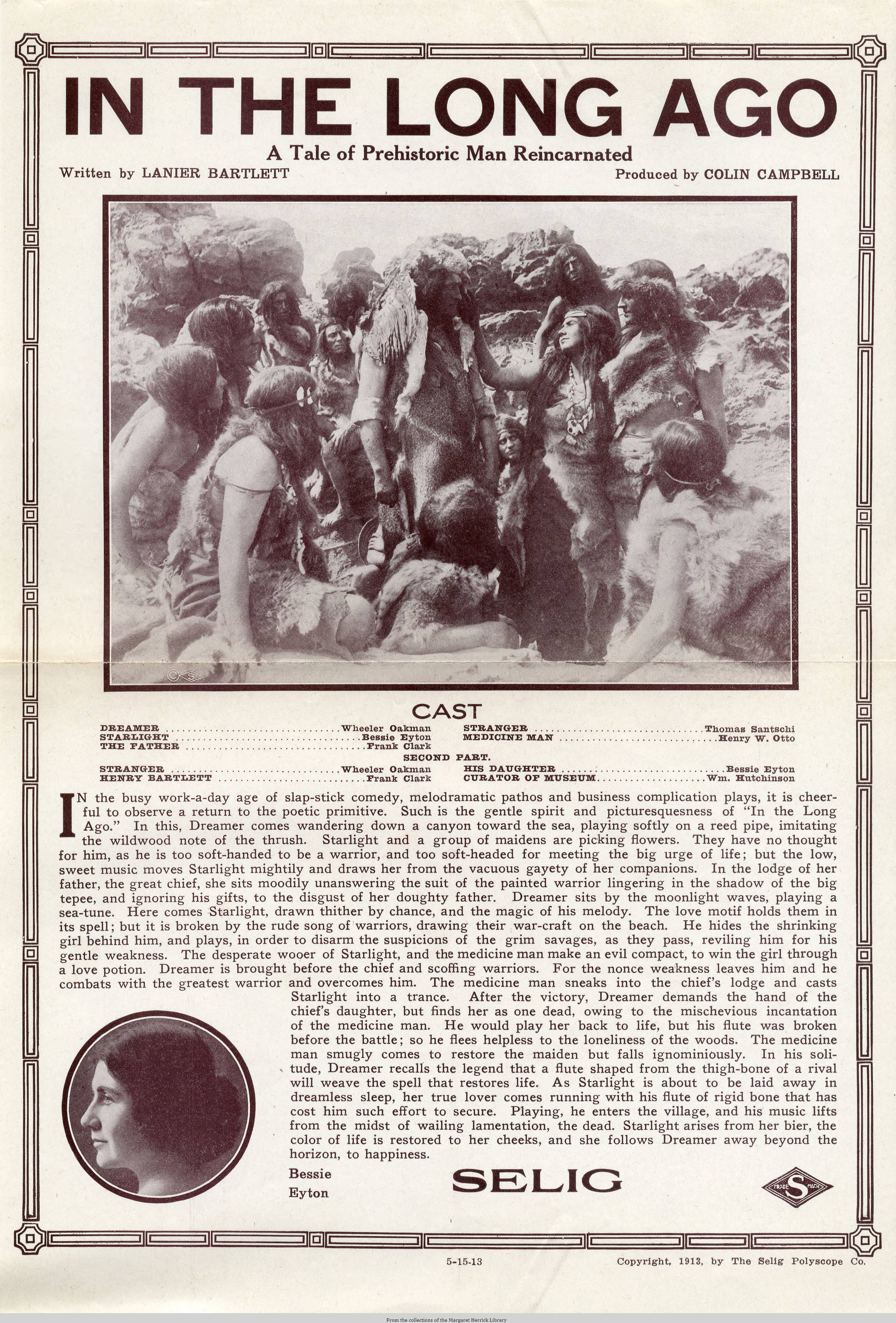

In the Long Ago is a 1913 silent film short directed by Colin Campbell. It was produced by the Selig Polyscope company and released by the General Film Company. Alternately the film is called The Long Ago.

== Cast ==
- Wheeler Oakman - Dreamer, the Indian Lover/The Modern Lover
- Bessie Eyton - Starlight, the Indian Maiden/Miss Bartlett, the Modern Sweetheart
- Frank Clark - Starlight's Father/Henry Bartlett, the Modern Girl's Father
- Tom Santschi - The Indian Warrior
- Henry Otto - The Medicine Man
- William Hutchison - The Curator of the Museum
