= Shotgun Jones =

1914 film

- Directed by: Colin Campbell
- Written by: Bertha Muzzy Sinclair
- Starring: Wheeler Oakman
- Distributed by: Selig Polyscope Company
- Release date: April 27, 1914
- Running time: 20 minutes
- Country: United States
- Languages: Silent; English intertitles

Shotgun Jones is a 1914 American short silent Western film directed by Colin Campbell.

== Cast ==
- Wheeler Oakman
- Jack McDonald
- Frank Clark (as Frank M. Clark)
- Hoot Gibson
- Bessie Eyton
- Fernando Gálvez
- William Elmer
- Joseph W. Girard

== See also ==
- Hoot Gibson filmography
