= The Count of Monte Cristo (1912 film) =

1912 film by Colin Campbell

The Count of Monte Cristo (aka:Monte Cristo)
- Directed by: Colin Campbell
- Written by: Colin Campbell
- Based on: novel Le comte de Monte Cristo by Alexandre Dumas, Pere
- Produced by: William Nicholas Selig
- Starring: Hobart Bosworth
- Distributed by: General Film Company
- Release date: October 14, 1912
- Running time: 3 reels
- Country: USA
- Language: Silent...English intertitles

The Count of Monte Cristo is a lost 1912 unauthorised silent film short directed by Colin Campbell and starring Hobart Bosworth. The film is a remake of the same story Selig had filmed in 1908. When this film was made Adolph Zukor had secured the rights to the 1844 novel and was about to release his 1913 version with James O'Neill who had made the role famous on stage. Zukor's attorneys ordered this film destroyed and all prints were withdrawn.

== Cast ==
- Hobart Bosworth - Edmond Dantes
- Tom Santschi - Danglars (*as William T. Santshi)
- Herbert Rawlinson - Caderouse
- Eugenie Besserer - Mercedes
- William Duncan
- James Robert Chandler - Captain LeClerc (*as Robert Chandler)
- George Hernandez - Napoleon
- Nick Cogley - Morrell (*as Nicholas Cogley)
- William Hutchison - M. Dantes (*as William Hutchinson)
- Roy Watson - Villefort
- Frank Clark - Nortier
- Fred Huntley - Abbe Faria (*as Fred Huntly)
- Bessie Eyton - Haidee
- Lillian Hayward - Carconte
- Al Ernest Garcia - Fernand (*as Al E. Garcia)
- Alvin Wyckoff
