= Bessie Eyton =

American actress

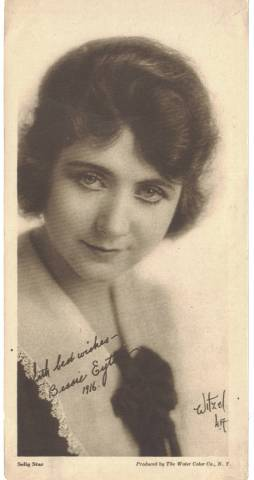
- Eyton in 1916
- Born: Bessie Harrison; July 5, 1890; Santa Barbara, California, U.S.
- Died: January 22, 1965 (aged 74); Thousand Oaks, California, U.S.
- Occupation: Actress
- Years active: 1911–1925
- Spouses: Charles Eyton (m. 1908; div. 1915) Clark Brewer Coffey (m. 1916; div. 1923)

Bessie Eyton (née Harrison; July 5, 1890 – January 22, 1965) was an American actress of the silent era. Eyton appeared in 200 films between 1911 and 1925. From 1911 to 1918, the period when the majority of her films were made, she was under contract to Selig Polyscope Company.

== Biography ==
Bessie Harrison was born on July 5, 1890, to musician Edgar Thomas Harrison (1868–1924) and Claribel Harrison (née. Mead, 1873–1959). She had a brother, Elbert Harrison.

Harrison married her first husband and namesake, actor Charles Eyton, on September 3, 1908. While attending a studio tour at Selig Polyscope Company, she was spotted by a director who wanted to cast her as an extra in a film. She made her film debut in The Sheriff of Tuolomne (1911) opposite Tom Mix. Although she made up to 200 films while signed to Selig, she is best known for her roles in The Spoilers (1914) and the 12-reel adaptation of American novelist Winston Churchill's The Crisis (1916). In addition to acting, she is also credited with being the screenwriter of the 1914 short The Smuggler's Sister.

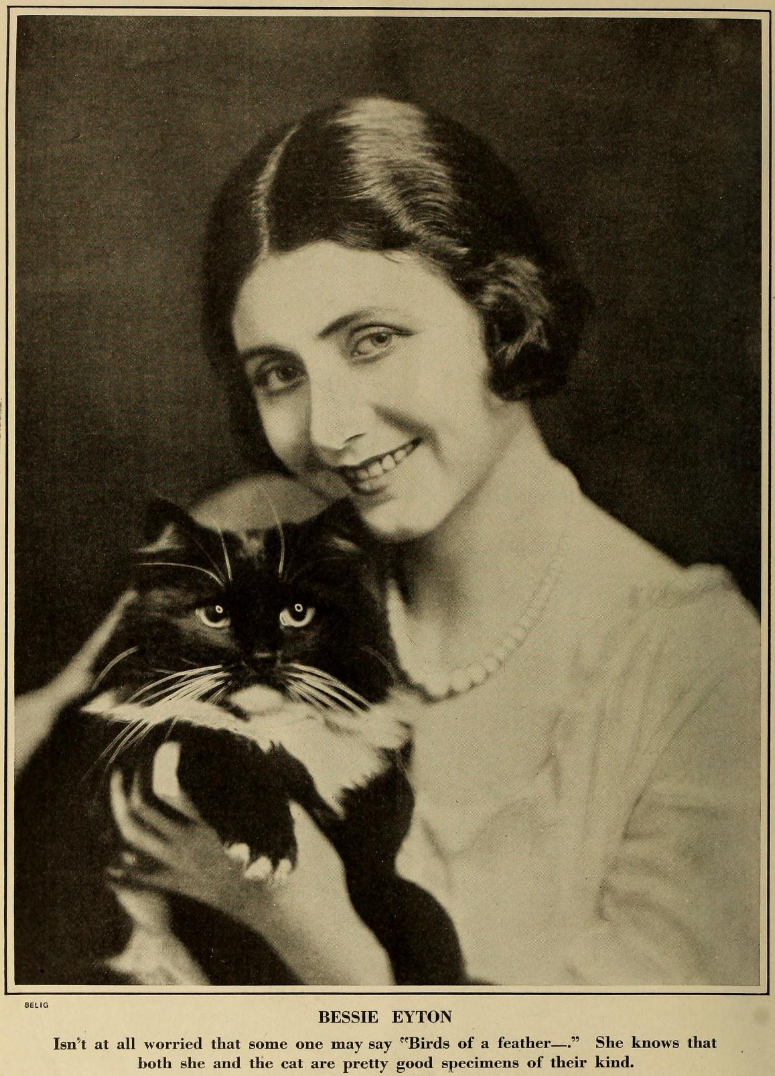
Bessie Eyton in Film Fun, June 1917

Eyton was one of Selig's biggest stars until the studio closed in 1918. Her career began to slow after that, and she only appeared in 9 films between 1919 and 1925, mostly for independent studios.

In 1919, she made her stage debut in Civilian Clothes, which opened on September 12, 1919. Her final screen appearance was in The Girl of Gold (1925), starring Florence Vidor.

Eyton married her second husband Clark Brewer Coffey on September 29, 1916, a year after her divorce from Charles Eyton. The marriage ended in divorce in 1923, and neither unions produced children.

In 1935, following an argument with her mother, Eyton disappeared from her friends and family. Her whereabouts remained unknown until her death in 1965.

Bessie Eyton died on January 22, 1965, in Thousand Oaks, California and was buried at Ivy Lawn Memorial Park in Ventura, California.

== Partial filmography ==
- The Sheriff of Tuolumne (1911)
- Saved from the Snow (1911)
- The Totem Mark (1911)
- Kit Carson's Wooing (1911)
- McKee Rankin's '49' (1911)
- An Indian Vestal (1911)
- Coals of Fire (1911)
- A Painters Idyl (1911)
- Captain Brand's Wife (1911)
- Lieutenant Grey of the Confederacy (1911)
- Blackbeard (1911)
- The Right Name, But the Wrong Man (1911)
- An Evil Power (1911)
- A Diamond in the Rough (1911)
- The Chief's Daughter (1911)
- George Warrington's Escape (1911)
- For His Pal's Sake (1911)
- Brown of Harvard (1911)
- The Mate of the Alden Bessie (1912)
- The Other Fellow (1912)
- The Peacemaker (1912)
- Merely a Millionaire (1912)
- The Little Stowaway (1912)
- Disillusioned (1912)
- The Danites (1912)
- The Shrinking Rawhide (1912)
- A Crucial Test (1912)
- The Ones Who Suffer (1912)
- The Hobo (1912)
- A Waif of the Sea (1912)
- Me an' Bill (1912)
- The End of the Romance (1912)
- Bessie's Dream (1912)
- The Price He Paid (1912)
- The Love of an Island Maid (1912)
- A Child of the Wilderness (1912)
- The Price of Art (1912)
- The Professor's Wooing (1912)
- In Exile (1912)
- The Lake of Dreams (1912)
- His Masterpiece (1912)
- In the Tents of the Asra (1912)
- The Indelible Stain (1912)
- The Pity of It (1912)
- The Great Drought (1912)
- When Edith Played Jungle and Jury (1912)
- Euchred (1912)
- The Count of Monte Cristo (1912)
- The Shuttle of Fate (1912)
- The Fisherboy's Faith (1912)
- Carmen of the Isles (1912)
- The Legend of the Lost Arrow (1912)
- Shanghaied (1912)
- Atala (1912)
- Miss Aubry's Love Affair (1912)
- The Triangle (1912)
- John Colter's Escape (1912)
- The God of Gold (1912)
- Opitsah: Apache for Sweetheart (1912)
- Sammy Orpheus; or, The Pied Piper of the Jungle (1912)
- The Last of Her Tribe (1912)
- The Little Organ Player of San Juan (1912)
- In the Long Ago (1913)
- Wamba A Child of the Jungle (1913)
- The Smuggler's Sister (1914)
- The Spoilers (1914)
- Shotgun Jones (1914)
- Chip of the Flying U (1914)
- In the Days of the Thundering Herd (1914)
- The Man from Texas (1915)
- The Crisis (1916)
- The Heart of Texas Ryan (1917)
- Beware of Strangers (1917)
- Who Shall Take My Life? (1917)
- The Still Alarm (1918)
- Lend Me Your Name (1918)
- The City of Purple Dreams (1918)
- The Still Alarm (1918)
- The Way of a Man with a Maid (1918)
- Children of Banishment (1919)
- A Man of Honor (1919)
- The Usurper (1919)
- Movie Mad (1921)
- Higher Education (1921)
- An Indiscreet Flirt (1921)
- A Dishonest Crook (1921)
- Cheap Kisses (1924)
- The Girl of Gold (1925)
