= Little Miss Hawkshaw =

1921 film

- Directed by: Carl Harbaugh
- Screenplay by: Carl Harbaugh
- Starring: Eileen Percy; Eric Mayne; Leslie Casey; Donald Keith; Frank Clark; Vivian Ransome
- Cinematography: Otto Brautigan
- Production company: Fox Film Corporation
- Distributed by: Fox Film Corporation
- Release date: August 23, 1921
- Running time: 50 minutes
- Country: United States

Little Miss Hawkshaw is a 1921 American drama film written and directed by Carl Harbaugh. The film stars Eileen Percy, Eric Mayne, Leslie Casey, Donald Keith, Frank Clark and Vivian Ransome. The film was released on August 23, 1921, by Fox Film Corporation.

== Cast ==
- Eileen Percy as Patricia
- Eric Mayne as Sir Stephen O'Neill
- Leslie Casey as Patricia's husband
- Donald Keith as Arthur Hawks
- Frank Clark as Mike Rorke
- Vivian Ransome as Miss Rorke
- J. Farrell MacDonald as Inspector Hahn
- Fred L. Wilson as J. Spencer Giles
- Glen Cavender as Sock Wolf
