= Brown of Harvard (1911 film) =

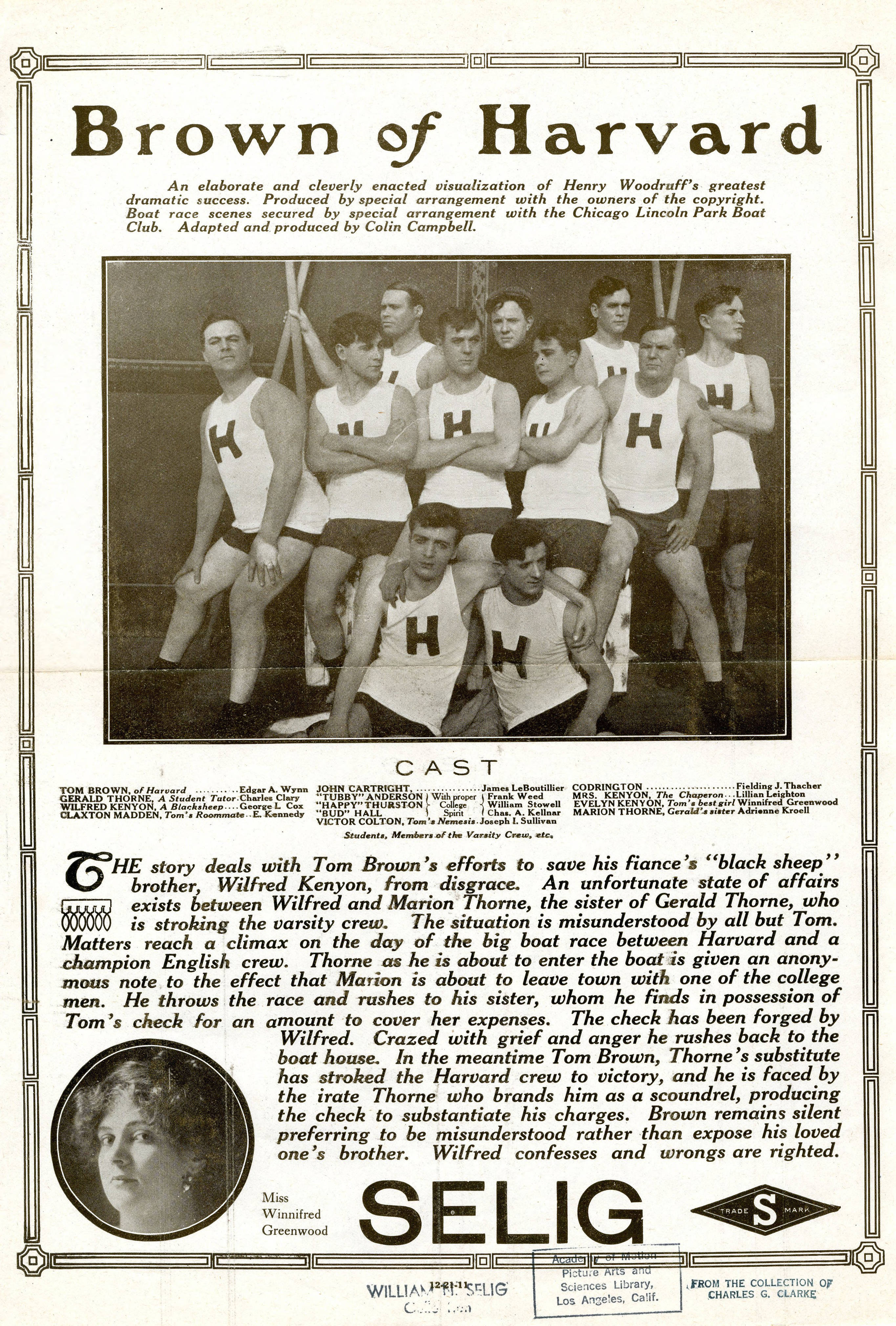
- Contemporary advertisement flier.
- Directed by: Colin Campbell
- Written by: Colin Campbell; Rida Johnson Young (play)
- Produced by: Selig Polyscope Company
- Release date: December 21, 1911
- Country: United States
- Languages: Silent film English intertitles

Brown of Harvard is a 1911 silent film based on the 1906 play of the same name by Rida Johnson Young. It was the film debut of Edgar Kennedy.

== Plot ==
The story deals with Tom Brown's efforts to save his fiance's "black sheep" brother Wilfred Kenyon from disgrace. An unfortunate state of affairs exists between Wilfred and Marion Thorne, the sister of Gerald, who is stroking the varsity crew. The situation is misunderstood by all but Tom. Matters reach a climax on the day the big boat race between Harvard and a champion English crew. Thorne as he is about to enter the boat is given an anonymous note to the effect that Marion is about to leave town with one of the college men. He throws the race and rashes to his sister, whom he finds in possession of Tom's check for an amount to cover her expenses. The check has been forged by Wilfred. Crazed with grief and anger, he rushes back to the boathouse. In the meantime, Tom Brown, Thorne's substitute has stroked the Harvard crew to victory and he is faced by the irate Thorne, who brands him as a scoundrel, producing the check to substantiate his charges. Brown remains silent preferring to be misunderstood rather than expose his loved one's brother. Wilfred confesses and wrongs are righted.

== Cast ==
- Edgar G. Wynn as Tom Brown of Harvard
- Charles Clary as Gerald Thorne, a Tutor
- George L. Cox as Wilfred Kenyon, a Black Sheep
- Edgar Kennedy as Claxton Madden
- James Le Boutillier as John Cartright
- Frank Weed as Tubby Anderson
- William Stowell as Happy Thurston
- Charles A. Kellner as Bud Hall
- Joseph Sullivan as Victor Colton
- Fielding J. Thatcher as Codrington
- Lillian Leighton as Mrs. Kenyon
- Winifred Greenwood as Evelyn Kenyon
- Adrienne Kroell as Marion Thorne, Gerald's Sister
- Hobart Bosworth Uncredited
- Bessie Eyton Uncredited
- Kempton Greene as Student (uncredited)
