= Al Ernest Garcia =

American Actor (b.1887–d.1938)

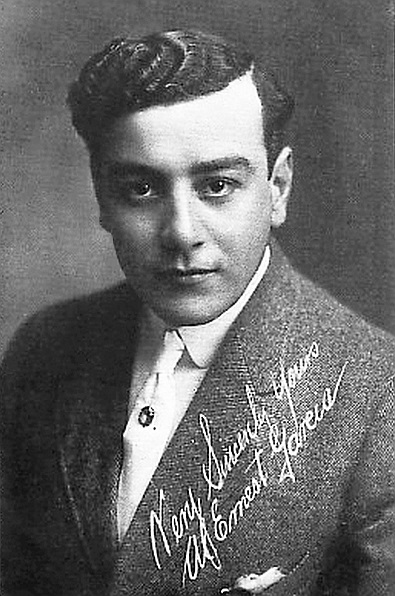
- Garcia, c. 1908–1915
- Born: Allan Ernest Garcia; March 11, 1887; San Francisco, California, U.S.
- Died: September 4, 1938 (aged 51); Santa Monica, California, U.S.
- Other names: Albert Garcia; Allan Garcia; Al Garcia; Al E. Garcia
- Years active: 1911–1938

Allan Ernest Garcia (11 March 1887 – 4 September 1938) was an American actor and casting director, best known for his long association with Charlie Chaplin.

== Life and career ==
Al Ernest Garcia appeared in over 120 films between 1911 and 1938, mostly in supporting roles. He frequently played in silent film westerns with stars including Leo Carrillo and Warner Baxter. Garcia also directed a short film named The Purple Scar in 1917, but it stayed his only work as a director. Born in California to Mexican parents, Garcia played in some Mexican films and also portrayed Mexicans in American films. With the advent of sound film, his roles were somewhat smaller, but he worked as an actor until his death.

Garcia is best remembered for his work with Charlie Chaplin. He acted with Chaplin in six films between 1921 and 1936. Chaplin cast him mostly in clinical or villainous supporting roles. Garcia portrayed the brutal circus director in The Circus (1928), the snobbish butler of the millionaire in City Lights (1931), and the factory owner in Modern Times (1936). He was also a casting director for Chaplin on The Circus, City Lights, and Modern Times. He worked for better pay and improved working conditions for supporting actors and bit players in films, and was co-founder of the Motion Picture Extras and Supporting Players Association, founded in 1933.

On 4 September 1938, Garcia died of a heart attack, in Santa Monica, California, aged 51.

== Filmography ==
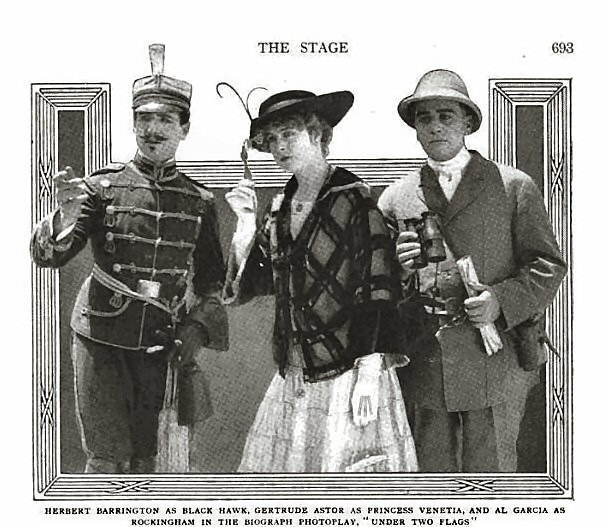
Garcia (right) with Herbert Barrington and Gertrude Astor in Under Two Flags (1915)

=== 1910s ===
- The Code of Honor (1911, Short)
- The Still Alarm (1911, Short) .... William Manley (as Frank Garcia)
- The Herders (1911, Short) .... Pedro
- Told in the Sierras (1911, Short) .... John Strong - the Prospector (as Albert Garcia)
- Slick's Romance (1911, Short) .... Yuba Frank (as Al E. Garcia)
- Their Only Son (1911, Short) .... Guy Medford (as Albert Garcia)
- The Regeneration of Apache Kid (1911, Short) .... The Apache Kid (as Albert Garcia)
- How Algy Captured a Wild Man (1911, Short) .... Teddy Windleigh (as Albert Garcia)
- Shipwrecked (1911, Short) .... Pierre Binbeau (as Albert E. Garcia)
- Old Billy (1911, Short) .... Fire Commissioner Hewitt
- An Evil Power (1911, Short) .... Antonio Giuseppe (as Al E. Garcia)
- The Cowboy's Adopted Child (1912, Short) .... Dan Mason (as Al E. Garcia)
- The Secret Wedding (1912, Short) .... Leon Braun (as Al E. Garcia)
- Merely a Millionaire (1912, Short) .... Harry Nichols
- The Bandit's Mask (1912, Short) .... Pedro Ramirez (as Al E. Garcia)
- The Test (1912, Short) .... Dalton (as Al E. Garcia)
- Disillusioned (1912, Short) .... Henry George (as Al E. Garcia)
- The Danites (1912, Short) .... Carter - a Danite (as Al E. Garcia)
- Bounder (1912, Short) .... Pete Lopez (as Al E. Garcia)
- The 'Epidemic' in Paradise Gulch (1912, Short) .... Jack Knight
- The Ones Who Suffer (1912, Short) .... The Prison Warden (as Al E. Garcia)
- The End of the Romance (1912, Short) .... Jack Lee
- The Hand of Fate (1912, Short) ... Fritz (as Al E. Garcia)
- A Humble Hero (1912, Short) .... 2nd Claim Jumper (as Al E. Garcia)
- The Lost Hat (1912, Short) .... The Hotel Clerk (as Al E. Garcia)
- A Reconstructed Rebel (1912, Short) .... Dick Winston
- The Vow of Ysobel (1912, Short) .... Jose
- A Messenger to Kearney (1912, Short) .... Palo Vasquez (as A.E. Garcia)
- The Little Indian Martyr (1912, Short) .... Chiquito's Father
- The Indelible Stain (1912, Short) .... Juan (as Al E. Garcia)
- The Substitute Model (1912) .... (as Al E. Garcia)
- The Pirate's Daughter (1912, Short) .... Vargas - the First Mate
- The Great Drought (1912, Short) .... Dominguez
- An Assisted Elopement (1912, Short) .... Brown - Tom's Chum (as Al E. Garcia)
- Monte Cristo (1912, Short) .... Fernand (as Al E. Garcia)
- Her Educator (1912, Short) .... Jim O'Keefe (as Al E. Garcia)
- Saved by Fire (1912, Short) .... J. Harden Stone
- The Girl of the Mountains (1912, Short) .... Jim - a Mountain Man (as Al E. Garcia)
- Our Lady of the Pearls (1912, Short) .... Vincente (as Al E. Garcia)
- A Black Hand Elopement (1913, Short)
- The Artist and the Brute (1913, Short) .... Hortez - the Animal Trainer (as Al E. Garcia)
- Yankee Doodle Dixie (1913, Short) .... Parson Sneed (as Al E. Garcia)
- The Spanish Parrot Girl (1913) .... Jose Raneros
- Margarita and the Mission Funds (1913, Short) .... Ramon, an Outlaw
- With Love's Eyes (1913, Short) .... Dunwood, An Artist
- The Tie of the Blood (1913, Short) .... Mathews, A Half-Breed
- The Burglar Who Robbed Death (1913, Short) .... Mr. Harrison
- Lieutenant Jones (1913, Short) .... Capt. Stanleigh
- The Stolen Melody (1913, Short) .... Richard Davidge (as A.E. Garcia)
- Woman: Past and Present (1913, Short) .... Father Time
- The Fighting Lieutenant (1913, Short) .... Don Arguello
- A Western Romance (1913, Short) .... Victor Kellogg
- The Reformation of Dad (1913, Short) .... Al B. Stone - the Circus Manager (as Al E. Garcia)
- The Mansion of Misery (1913, Short) .... Prince Lorenzo
- In the Midst of the Jungle (1913, Short) .... (as Al E. Garcia)
- An Actor's Romance (1913, Short) .... Rant - the Hungry Actor
- The Big Horn Massacre (1913, Short) .... Lt. Blake Stevens (as Ernest Garcia)
- The Valley of the Moon (1914) .... Bart (as Ernest Garcia)
- Kate Waters of the Secret Service (1914, Short) .... Bronson (as Al E. Garcia)
- Rose of the Rancho (1914) .... Henchman (uncredited)
- Young Romance (1915) .... Spagnoli (as Al Garcia)
- After Five (1915) .... (as Ernest Garcia)
- The Country Boy (1915) .... Jimmy Michaelson
- The Unafraid (1915, Short) .... Joseph
- Under Two Flags (1915, Short) .... Rockingham (as Al E. Garcia)
- Gangsters of the Hills (1915, Short) .... Deering - of the Secret Service (as Al E. Garcia)
- Her Atonement (1915) .... John De Forrest
- The Law at Silver Camp (1915, Short) .... Paul Long - a Railway Surveyor
- Clouds in Sunshine Valley (1916, Short) .... Jim Carr (as Al E. Garcia)
- The Greater Power (1916, Short) .... Al Gordon (as Al E. Garcia)
- The Single Code (1917) .... Rodman Wray (as Ernesto Garcia)
- The Purple Scar (1917, Short) .... (as Al E. Garcia)
- Sunlight's Last Raid (1917) .... Pedro (as A. Garcia)
- Restitution (1918) .... Lucifer and Satan (as Alfred Garcia)
- Baree, Son of Kazan (1918) .... 'Bush' McTaggart (as Al Garcia)
- A Gentleman's Agreement (1918) .... Manager of Mine (as Al Garcia)
- The Lamb and the Lion (1919) .... Red Baxter (as Al Garcia)
- Six Feet Four (1919) .... Ben Broderick
- The Trail of the Octopus (1919) .... Wang (as Earnest Garcia)
- The Counterfeit Trail (1919, Short) .... Two Spot Joe (as Al E. Garcia)

=== 1920s ===
- The Golden Trail (1920) .... Jean the Half-Breed (as Al Garcia)
- Skyfire (1920) .... Pierre Piquet (as Al Garcia)
- Reputation (1921) .... Leading man (stage sequence)
- The Idle Class (1921, Short) .... Cop in Park / Guest (uncredited)
- Pay Day (1922, Short) .... Drinking Companion and Policeman
- The Three Buckaroos (1922) .... 'Card' Ritchie
- The Power God (1925) .... Weston Dore (as Allan Garcia)
- The Gold Rush (1925) .... Prospector (uncredited)
- The Circus (1928) .... The Circus Proprietor and Ring Master (as Allan Garcia)
- Morgan's Last Raid (1929) .... Morgan

=== 1930s ===
- City Lights (1931) .... James, The Eccentric Millionaire's Butler
- Gran jornada, La (1931) .... Flack
- The Cisco Kid (1931) .... Orderly (uncredited)
- The Deceiver (1931) .... Payne
- Models and Wives (1931, Short)
- South of Santa Fe (1932) .... Captain Felipe Mendezez Gonzales Rodrigues (as Captain Garcia)
- The Gay Desperado (1932) .... Bandit (as Allan Garcia)
- Marido y mujer (1932) .... Dr. Burgess
- One Way Passage (1932) .... Honolulu Cigar Store Proprietor (uncredited)
- The California Trail (1933) .... Sergeant Florez (as Allan Garcia)
- Under the Tonto Rim (1933) .... Mexican Police Chief (as Allan Garcia)
- Modern Times (1936) .... President of the Electro Steel Corp. (as Allan Garcia)
- The Gay Desperado (1936) .... Police Captain
- The Last Train from Madrid (1937) .... Third Hotel Clerk (uncredited)
- I'll Take Romance (1937) .... Allan Garcia (uncredited)
- Blossoms on Broadway (1937) .... Opera Patron (as Allan Garcia) (uncredited)
- Blockade (1938) .... Minor Role (uncredited)
- In Old Mexico (1938) .... Don Carlos Gonzales (as Al Garcia) (final film role)
