= The Love Charm =

1921 film by Thomas N. Heffron

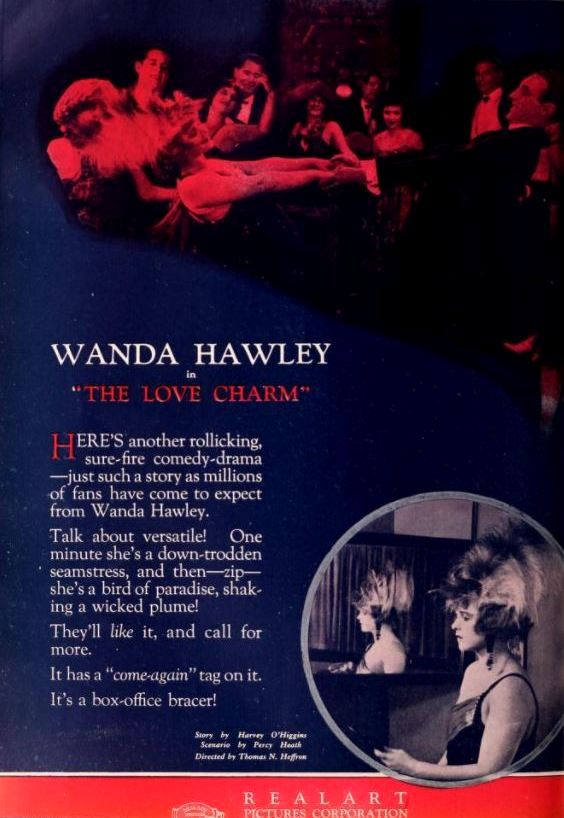
- Advertisement
- Directed by: Thomas N. Heffron
- Written by: Percy Heath
- Story by: Harvey J. O'Higgins
- Starring: Wanda Hawley; Mae Busch; Sylvia Ashton
- Cinematography: William E. Collins
- Production company: Realart Pictures
- Distributed by: Paramount Pictures
- Release date: November 1921
- Running time: 5 reels
- Country: United States
- Language: Silent (English intertitles)

The Love Charm is a 1921 American silent comedy film directed by Thomas N. Heffron, starring Wanda Hawley, Mae Busch, and Sylvia Ashton.

== Cast ==
- Wanda Hawley as Ruth Sheldon
- Mae Busch as Hattie Nast
- Sylvia Ashton as Julia Nast
- Warner Baxter as Thomas Morgan
- Carrie Clark Ward as Housekeeper
- Molly McGowan as Maybelle Mooney
- Richard Rosson
- Michael D. Moore as the little boy

== Preservation ==
With no holdings located in archives, The Love Charm is considered a lost film.
