= Frank Clark (actor) =

American actor (1857–1945)

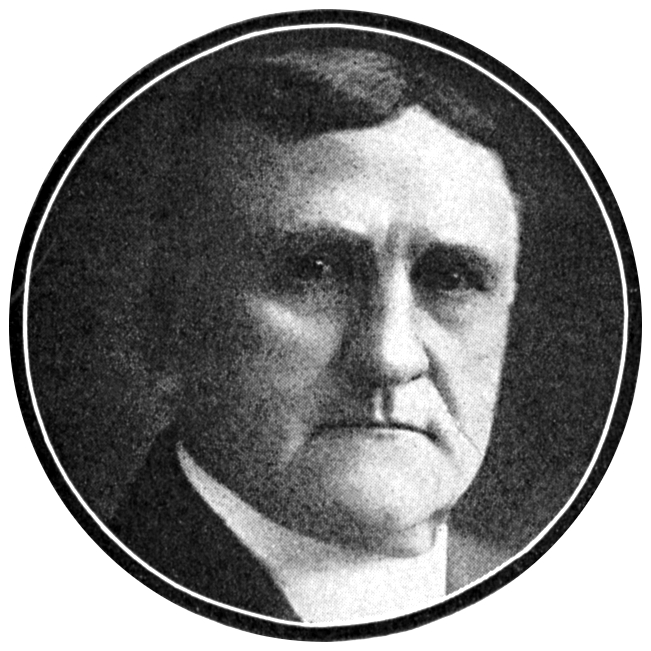
- Clark in 1913
- Born: December 22, 1857; Cincinnati, Ohio, United States
- Died: April 10, 1945 (aged 87); Woodland Hills, Los Angeles, United States
- Years active: 1911-1938

Frank Clark (December 22, 1857 – April 10, 1945) was an American actor of the silent era. He appeared in almost 200 films between 1910 and 1938, often early with the Selig Polyscope Company. He was born in Cincinnati, Ohio and died in Woodland Hills, Los Angeles.

== Partial filmography ==
- The Sergeant (1910)
- An Assisted Elopement (1912)
- The Count of Monte Cristo (1912)
- Alas! Poor Yorick! (1913)
- In the Long Ago (1913)
- Wamba A Child of the Jungle (1913)
- The Spoilers (1914)
- Shotgun Jones (1914)
- Chip of the Flying U (1914)
- The Carpet from Bagdad (1915)
- Sweet Alyssum (1915)
- The Ne'er-Do-Well (1916)
- The Garden of Allah (1916)
- The Man from Painted Post (1917)
- Beware of Strangers (1917)
- The Price of Silence (1917)
- Western Blood (1918)
- The Yellow Dog (1918)
- The City of Purple Dreams (1918)
- The Turn of a Card (1918)
- The Light of Western Stars (1918)
- Trixie from Broadway (1919)
- The Wilderness Trail (1919)
- Yvonne from Paris (1919)
- The Tiger Lily (1919)
- The Hellion (1919)
- The Lost City (1920)
- The Untamed (1920)
- The Rookie's Return (1920)
- The Valley of Tomorrow (1920)
- Wanted at Headquarters (1920)
- The Diamond Queen (1921)
- Live Wires (1921)
- Hands Off! (1921)
- Little Miss Hawkshaw (1921)
- My Wild Irish Rose (1922)
- The Lone Star Ranger (1923)
- The Fatal Mistake (1924)
- Tainted Money (1924)
- Wolf Blood (1925)
- Under the Rouge (1925)
- Border Blackbirds (1927)
- The Boss of Rustler's Roost (1928)
- A Final Reckoning (1928)
- The Bronc Stomper (1928)
- The Four-Footed Ranger (1928)
- The Hound of Silver Creek (1928)
- Outlawed (1929)
- Roaring Ranch (1930)
- Code of Honor (1930)
- Western Racketeers (1934)
- The Border Menace (1934)
- The Phantom Cowboy (1935)
