= The World's a Stage =

1922 film

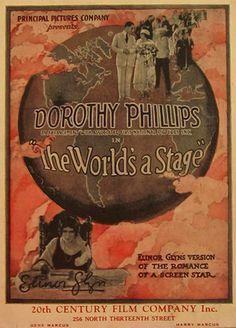
- Directed by: Colin Campbell
- Written by: George C. Bertholon; Colin Campbell
- Story by: Elinor Glyn
- Produced by: Sol Lesser
- Starring: Dorothy Phillips; Bruce McRae; Kenneth Harlan
- Cinematography: Dal Clawson; Byron Haskin
- Production company: Principal Pictures
- Distributed by: Principal Distributing
- Release date: November 1, 1922
- Running time: 60 minutes
- Country: United States
- Language: Silent (English intertitles)

The World's a Stage is a 1922 American silent drama film directed by Colin Campbell and starring Dorothy Phillips, Bruce McRae, and Kenneth Harlan.

== Cast ==
- Dorothy Phillips as Jo Bishop
- Bruce McRae as John Brand
- Kenneth Harlan as Wallace Foster
- Otis Harlan as Richard Manseld Bishop
- Jack McDonald as Property Man

== Censorship ==
Before The World's a Stage could be exhibited in Kansas, the Kansas Board of Review required the removal of a scene where a woman dances on the table at a groom's supper.

== Bibliography ==
- Donald W. McCaffrey & Christopher P. Jacobs. Guide to the Silent Years of American Cinema. Greenwood Publishing, 1999. ISBN 0-313-30345-2
