= Who Shall Take My Life? =

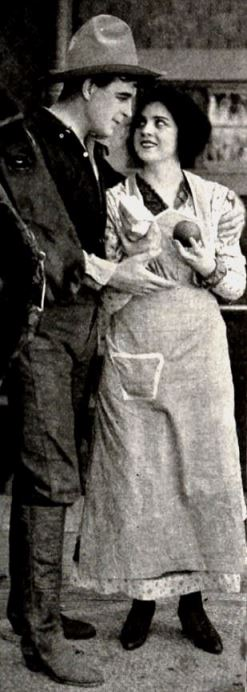
- Still with Coxen and Brunette
- Directed by: Colin Campbell
- Written by: Maibelle Heikes Justice; Gilson Willets
- Produced by: William Nicholas Selig
- Starring: Tom Santschi; Fritzi Brunette; Edward Coxen
- Production company: Selig Polyscope Company
- Distributed by: Selig Polyscope Company
- Release date: December 1917
- Running time: 7 reels
- Country: United States
- Language: Silent (English intertitles)

Who Shall Take My Life? is a 1917 American silent drama film directed by Colin Campbell and starring Tom Santschi, Fritzi Brunette, and Edward Coxen.

== Cast ==
- Tom Santschi as Big Bill O'Shaughnessy
- Fritzi Brunette as Kate Taylor
- Edward Coxen as Fran Coswell
- Bessie Eyton as Mary Moran
- Harry Lonsdale as Honorable James Munroe
- Eugenie Besserer as Mrs. Munroe
- Al W. Filson as The governor
- Virginia Kirtley as Mag Scott

== Bibliography ==
- Donald W. McCaffrey & Christopher P. Jacobs. Guide to the Silent Years of American Cinema. Greenwood Publishing, 1999. ISBN 0-313-30345-2
