= Sweet Alyssum (film) =

1915 film

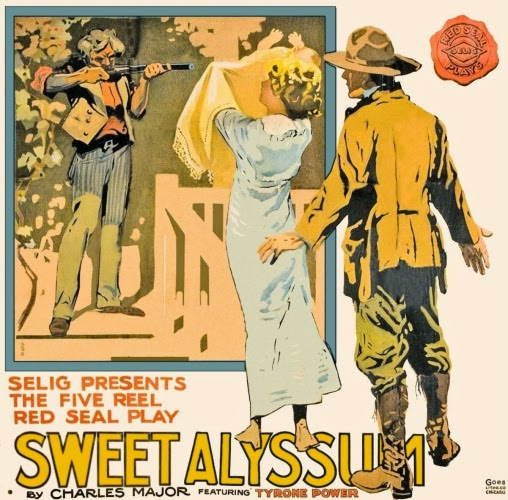
- Advertisement
- Directed by: Colin Campbell
- Written by: Charles Major (story); Gilson Willets
- Produced by: William Nicholas Selig
- Starring: Tyrone Power Sr.; Kathlyn Williams; Edith Johnson
- Production company: Selig Polyscope Company
- Distributed by: V-L-S-E
- Release date: November 15, 1915
- Running time: 59 minutes
- Country: United States
- Language: Silent (English intertitles)

Sweet Alyssum is a 1915 American silent drama film directed by Colin Campbell and starring Tyrone Power Sr., Kathlyn Williams, and Edith Johnson. A print of Sweet Alyssum exists.

== Cast ==
- Tyrone Power Sr. as Roanoke Brooks
- Kathlyn Williams as Daisy Brooks
- Edith Johnson as Sweet Alyssum
- Wheeler Oakman as Wynne Garlan
- Frank Clark as Robert Garlan
- Harry Lonsdale as Thurlow

== Bibliography ==
- Donald W. McCaffrey & Christopher P. Jacobs. Guide to the Silent Years of American Cinema. Greenwood Publishing, 1999. ISBN 0-313-30345-2
