= Beware of Strangers =

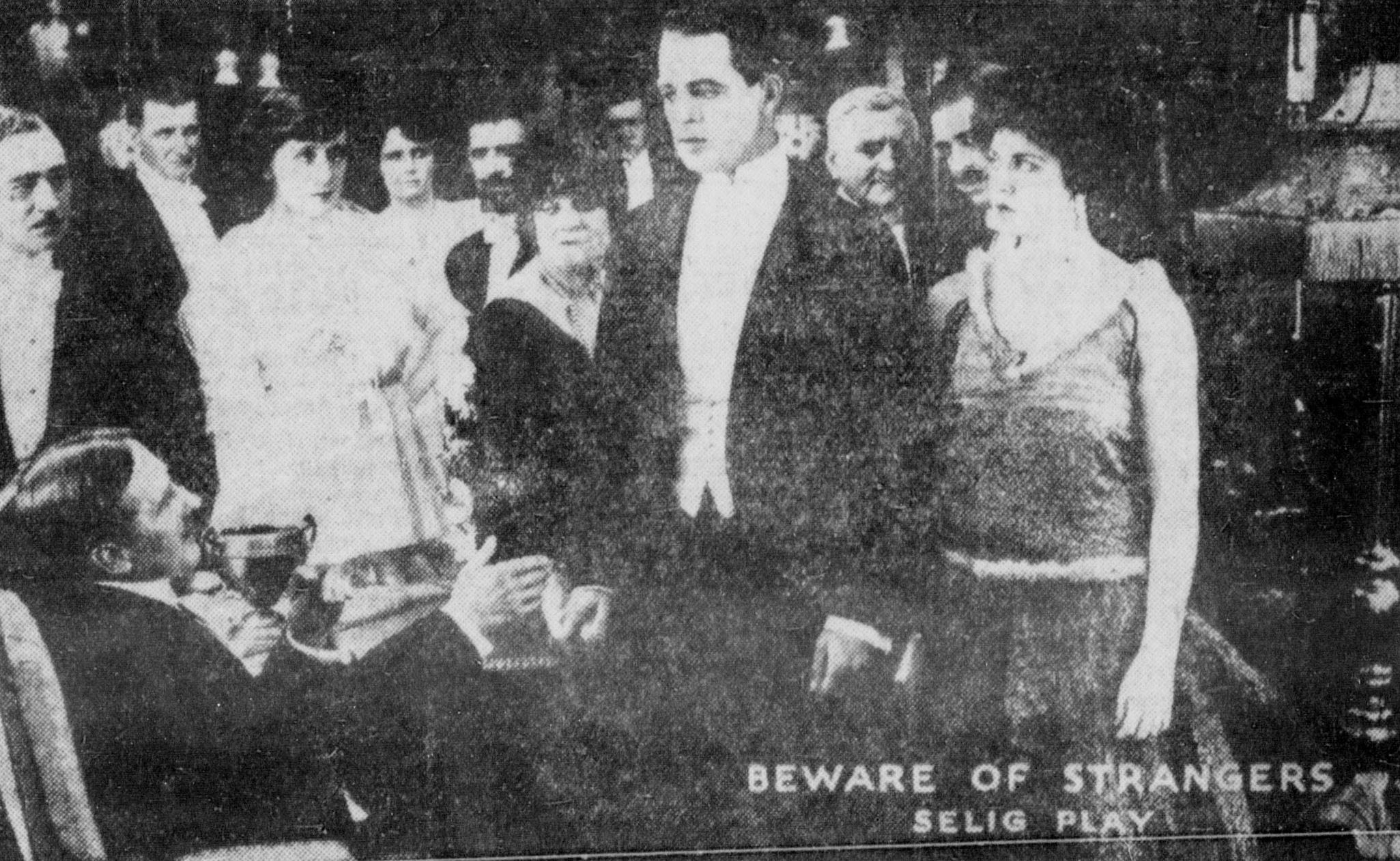
- Publicity photo
- Directed by: Colin Campbell
- Written by: Gilson Willets
- Produced by: William Nicholas Selig
- Starring: Fritzi Brunette; Tom Santschi; Bessie Eyton
- Production company: Selig Polyscope Company
- Distributed by: Selig Polyscope Company
- Release date: February 10, 1917
- Running time: 8 reels
- Country: United States
- Language: Silent (English intertitles)

Beware of Strangers is a 1917 American silent drama film directed by Colin Campbell and starring Fritzi Brunette, Tom Santschi, and Bessie Eyton.

== Cast ==
- Fritzi Brunette as Bertha Gibson
- Tom Santschi as John Mentor
- Bessie Eyton as Madeleine, Mentor's Daughter
- Edward Coxen as Harry Lyttle
- Jack Richardson as Professor Otto Rusburg, a Clairvoyant
- Vivian Rich as The Lorelei
- Al W. Filson as J. Everett Kinkaid Wetworth, Millionaire
- Frank Clark as Horace Kincaid, a Quack Doctor
- Eugenie Besserer as Mary DeLacy
- Harry Lonsdale as John DeLacy

== Bibliography ==
- Donald W. McCaffrey & Christopher P. Jacobs. Guide to the Silent Years of American Cinema. Greenwood Publishing, 1999. ISBN 0-313-30345-2
