= Chip of the Flying U (1914 film) =

1914 film

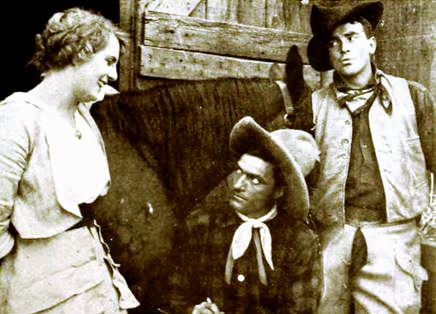
- still of a scene in the film
- Directed by: Colin Campbell
- Written by: Colin Campbell; Peter B. Kyne
- Based on: novel by Bertha Muzzy Sinclair (as B. M. Bower)
- Produced by: Selig Polyscope Company
- Starring: Tom Mix; Kathlyn Williams; Wheeler Oakman
- Distributed by: General Film Company
- Release date: August 29, 1914
- Running time: 3 reels
- Country: United States
- Languages: Silent; English intertitles

Chip of the Flying U is a 1914 American short silent Western film directed by Colin Campbell and starring Tom Mix. It was produced by Selig Polyscope Company and distributed by the General Film Company.

== Cast ==
- Tom Mix as Claude Bennett aka Chip
- Kathlyn Williams as Della Whitmore as The Little Doctor
- Wheeler Oakman as Weary
- Frank Clark as Patsy, The Cook
- Fred Huntley as Old Man Whitmore
- Jack McDonald as Dunk
- Bessie Eyton as Dr. Cecil Grantham
- Old Blue as Chip's Horse

== Preservation status ==
- A copy is preserved incomplete in the Library of Congress collection.
