= The Carpet from Bagdad =

1915 film

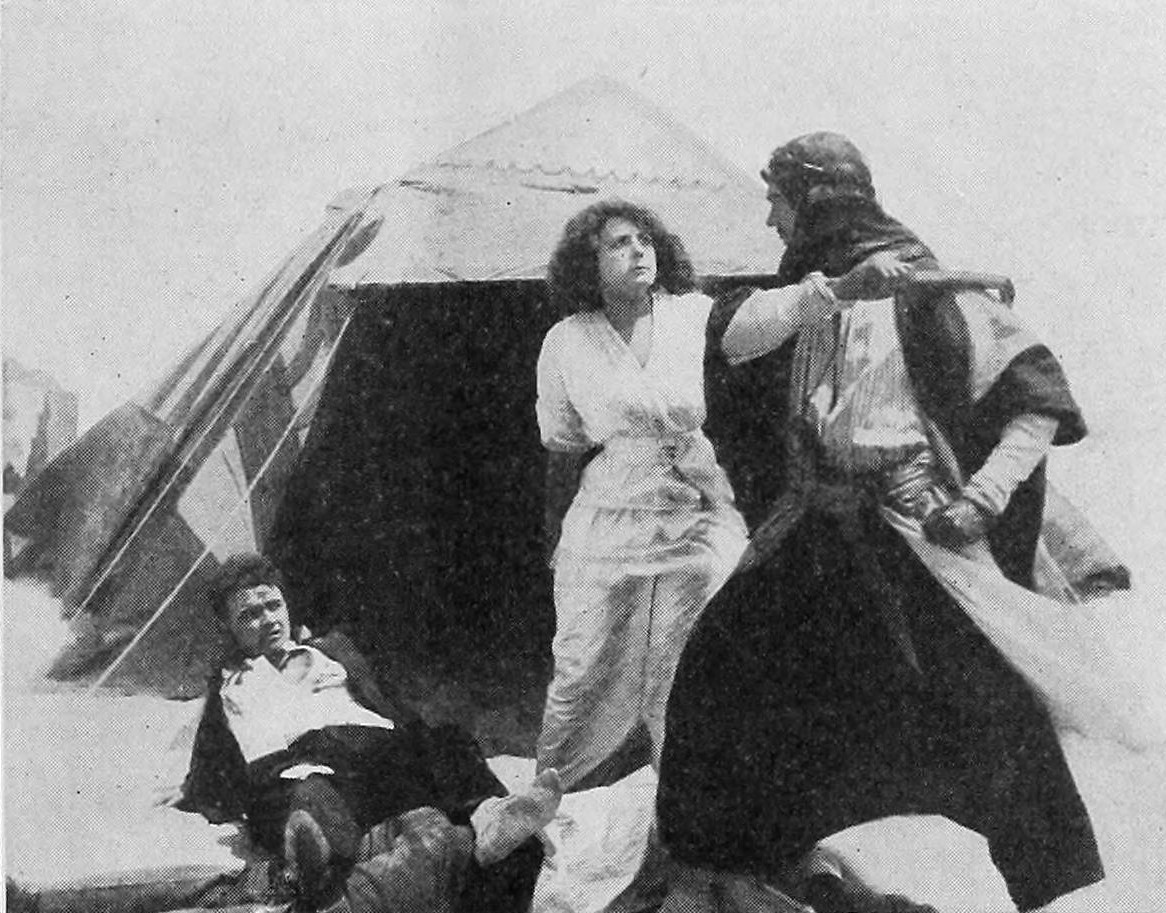
- Wheeler Oakman, Kathlyn Williams and Charles Clary in The Carpet from Bagdad
- Directed by: Colin Campbell
- Written by: Harold MacGrath
- Based on: The Carpet from Bagdad by Harold MacGrath
- Starring: Kathlyn Williams; Wheeler Oakman; Guy Oliver; Charles Clary
- Production company: Selig Polyscope Company
- Distributed by: V-L-S-E, Incorporated
- Release date: May 3, 1915
- Running time: 5 reels
- Country: United States
- Language: Silent (English intertitles)

The Carpet from Bagdad is a 1915 American silent adventure film directed by Colin Campbell and based on Harold MacGrath's 1911 eponymous novel. In the story, Horace Wadsworth (played by Guy Oliver), one of a gang of criminals planning a bank robbery in New York, steals the titular prayer rug from its Baghdad mosque. He sells the carpet to antique dealer George Jones (Wheeler Oakman) to fund the robbery scheme. But the theft places both men and Fortune Chedsoye (Kathlyn Williams), the innocent daughter of another conspirator, in danger from the carpet's guardian.

Marketing for the film included a media tour of part of the set and an invitation-only screening sponsored by the publisher of MacGrath's book. The Carpet from Bagdad was released on May 3, 1915 to mostly positive reviews. Many praised the tinted desert scenes and realistic Middle East imagery, although some felt the scenery overshadowed the characters. The film is now mostly lost, although one badly damaged reel was salvaged in 1982 from the RMS Lusitania. The ship was torpedoed and sunk by a German U-boat during the First World War on 7 May 1915.

== Plot ==
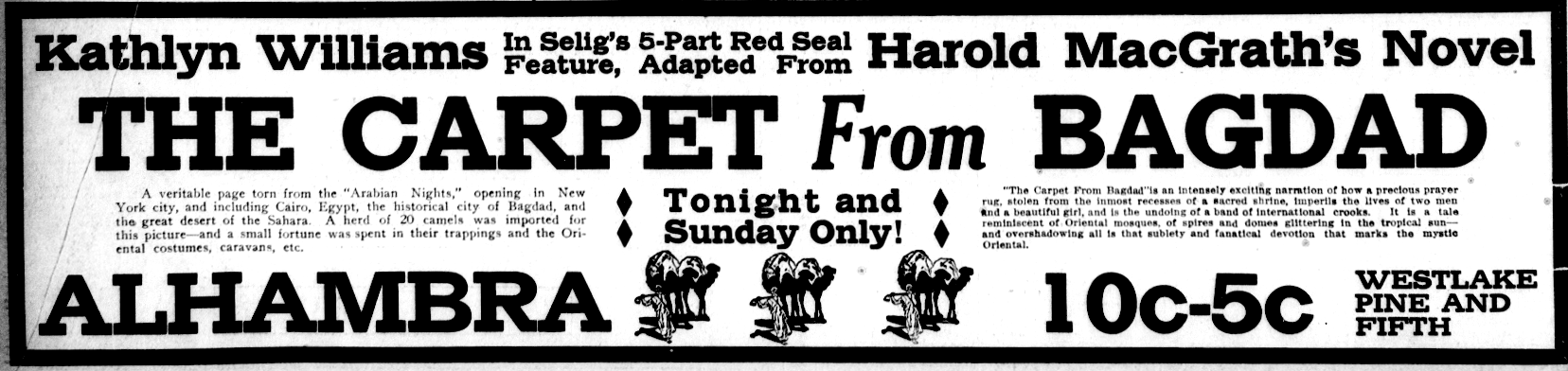
Newspaper ad for the film

Horace Wadsworth, disinherited brother of New York banker Arthur Wadsworth, joins a gang of international criminals. He plots to rob his brother's bank by constructing a tunnel from the nearby home of antique dealer George Jones, who is currently on a trip to Cairo to purchase antique rugs. Horace follows him there, and, learning of the Sacred Carpet of Bagdad, joins the caravan of its sworn guardian, Mohamed. Meanwhile, Horace's confederates Major Callahan and Mrs. Chedsoye arrive in Cairo along with Mrs. Chedsoye's daughter, Fortune, who is unaware of her mother's illicit activities.

When the criminals meet with Jones in Cairo, Jones becomes enamored of Fortune. Horace steals the Sacred Carpet from Mohamed's mosque and sells it to Jones to fund the robbery plan. Fortune, becoming suspicious of her mother and the surrounding events, steals the prayer rug from Jones and hides it in her mother's effects. Unable to locate the stolen carpet, Mohamed kidnaps Horace, Jones, and Fortune. Meanwhile, Mrs. Chedsoye and Major Callahan return to New York, where a fourth member of the conspiracy, Wallace, has acquired forged paperwork to gain access to the Jones residence.

The captives escape from Mohamed's planned torture and flee to Damascus. Horace immediately returns to New York to rejoin his compatriots. Fortune and Jones, who have fallen in love, also travel back to New York. Once there, Jones learns of the forgery, and returns home to confront the gang, who still have the Sacred Carpet and who have completed their tunnel into the vaults of Arthur Wadsworth's bank. Sympathetic to Horace after their shared experiences, Jones offers the robbers a two-hour lead before he notifies the police, but keeps the prayer rug. Meanwhile, Mohamed resigns himself to the loss of the carpet.

== Cast ==
- Kathlyn Williams as Fortune Chedsoye
- Wheeler Oakman as George P.A. Jones
- Guy Oliver as Horace Wadsworth
- Eugenie Besserer as Mrs. Chedsoye
- Frank Clark as Major Callahan
- Charles Clary as Mohamed
- Harry Lonsdale as Arthur Wadsworth
- Fred Huntley as Wallace

== Production and marketing ==
The Carpet from Bagdad is a film adaptation of Harold MacGrath's 1911 novel of the same name. MacGrath was a well-traveled, successful author of over a dozen novels. Stories with Asian settings were in vogue at the time, and both The Carpet from Bagdad and the Selig Polyscope Company's previous adaptation of MacGrath's work, the popular serial The Adventures of Kathlyn, are set in part in the Near East.

Director Colin Campbell was concerned with the film's realism. He had sets constructed to represent the streets of Cairo, Baghdad, and Damascus, and used animals from the Selig Zoo. Scenes set in the Arabian and Sahara Deserts were filmed in the deserts of California. The Arab characters' clothing was genuine, and the actors portraying those roles were required to remain dressed in-character throughout the several days of desert filming to ensure they would appear more natural in the imported garments. Much of the film, including the desert scenes, was hand tinted. Production costs exceeded $35,000, the equivalent of over $1,100,000 in present-day terms.

William Selig aggressively promoted his studio and its films. One such promotion, a March 1915 media tour of the unfinished Selig Zoo, allowed reporters a visit to The Carpet from Bagdad's bazaar set. This was the first film distributed by V-L-S-E, a conglomerate created by Vitagraph Studios, Lubin Manufacturing Company, Selig Polyscope Company, and Essanay Studios. The film was also screened in a special invitation-only showing at the art gallery of the Bobbs-Merrill Company, publisher of MacGrath's novel, an early example of a sponsored exhibition of a feature film in a location other than a theater.

== Reception ==
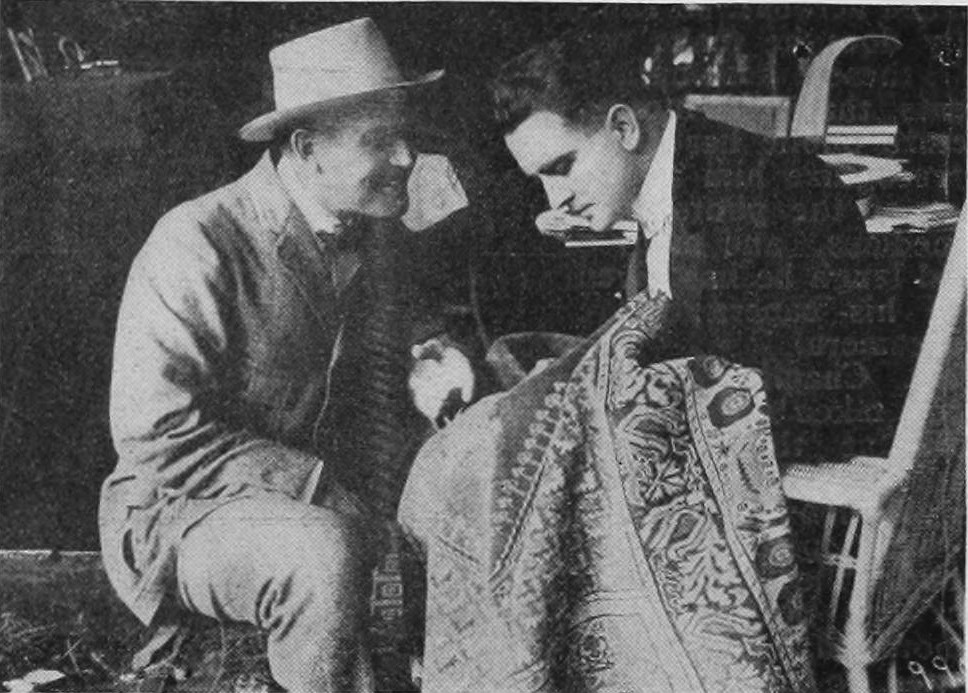
Guy Oliver and Wheeler Oakman in a scene with the Sacred Carpet of Bagdad

The Carpet from Bagdad was released on May 3, 1915, to generally positive reviews. Variety described it as a more interesting film than its title might imply, with "perfect direction and faultless acting". Peter Milne of Motion Picture News approved of Campbell's attention to detail and realism. The Moving Picture World's James McQuade praised the film's acting and special effects. Although he believed an unfilmed Cairo scene made Mohamed's motivations easier to understand in the novel, he considered the film a "close second" to Campbell's 1914 The Spoilers. Clarence Caine's review in Motography also compared The Carpet from Bagdad favorably to The Spoilers, but he viewed the film's color as its best feature, especially the closing scene of a desert sunset. Several newspaper reviews also complimented the tinted desert scenes, with New Zealand's The Levin Chronicle describing the film as "a gem of the cinematographer's art" for its use of color. The Chicago Daily Tribune offered a more mixed opinion on the film; reviewer Kitty Kelly found it difficult to care about characters "overshadowed by environment", and considered the 35-year-old Williams unconvincing as an ingenue.

Despite the acclaim from many contemporary reviewers, modern scholars of the silent film era would not consider The Carpet from Bagdad a masterpiece, according to the British Film Institute's Clyde Jeavons.

== Partial rediscovery ==
Like many films from the silent era, The Carpet from Bagdad was believed completely lost, but in 1982 an Oceaneering International diving expedition salvaged a number of artifacts from the wreck of the RMS Lusitania, including one reel of film. With the assistance of BBC technical advisor Laurie Ward, the BFI National Archive was able to recover images from several feet of the film, sufficient to identify the title, but not to restore any of the film to projectable condition. Although there was a theater on Lusitania, this print of The Carpet from Bagdad was probably being taken to London as a film distributor's preview, as was the case for several other films known to have been on board.

== See also ==
- List of incomplete or partially lost films
