= Wamba, a Child of the Jungle =

Wamba A Child of the Jungle
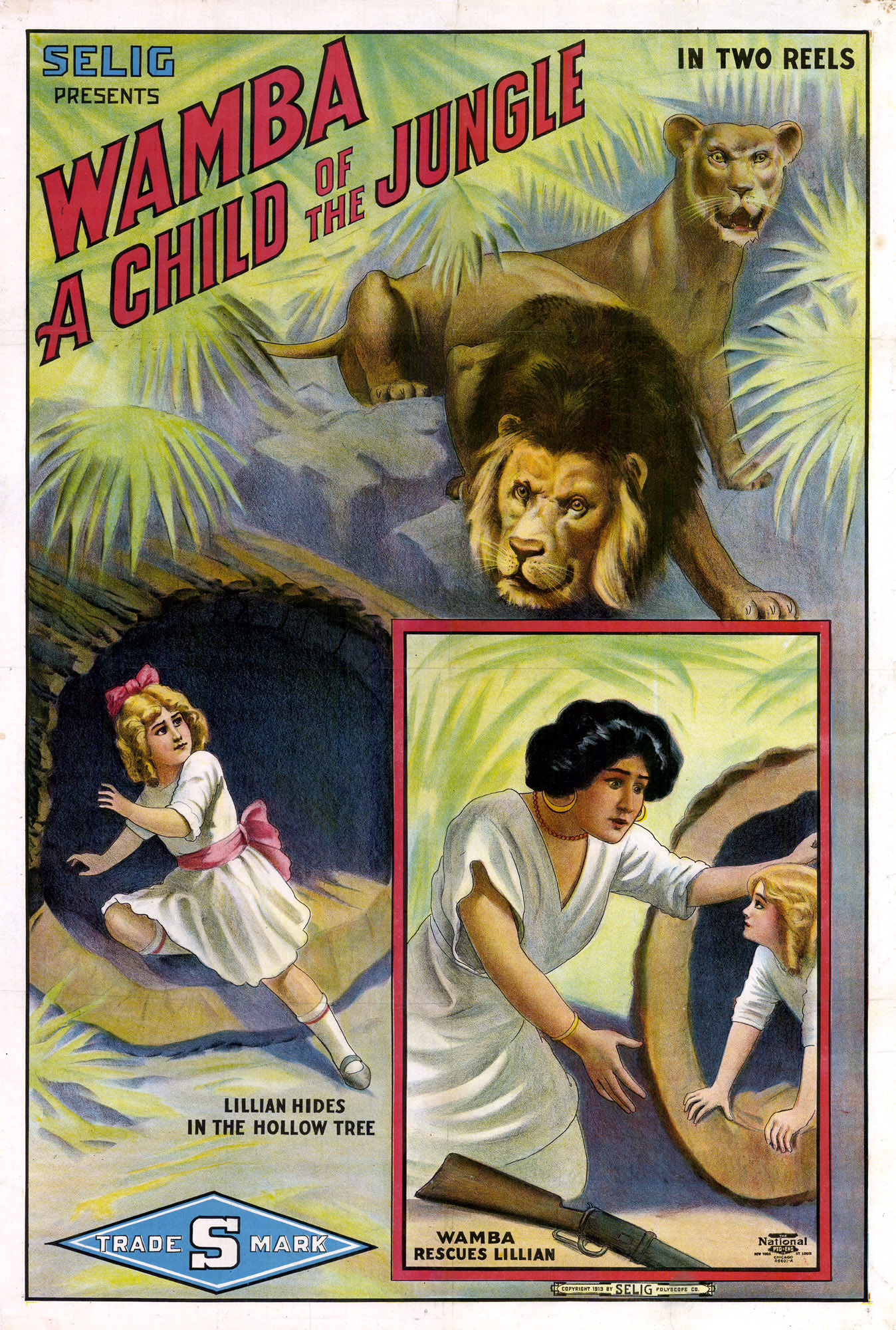
- vintage poster
- Directed by: Colin Campbell
- Written by: Otto Breitkreutz
- Produced by: William Nicholas Selig
- Starring: Tom Santschi; Bessie Eyton; Eugenie Besserer
- Distributed by: Selig Polyscope Company
- Release date: May 26, 1913
- Running time: 20 minutes; 2 reels
- Country: USA
- Language: Silent..English titles

Wamba A Child of the Jungle is a 1913 silent short 2 reel film directed by Colin Campbell and released by the Selig Polyscope Company.

== Cast ==
- Tom Santschi as Portuguese Pete
- Bessie Eyton as Wamba
- Frank Clark as Dr. Rice
- Eugenie Besserer as Mrs. Rice
- Baby Lillian Wade as Wamba's Child (*as Lillian Wade)
