= Thomas N. Heffron =

American film director

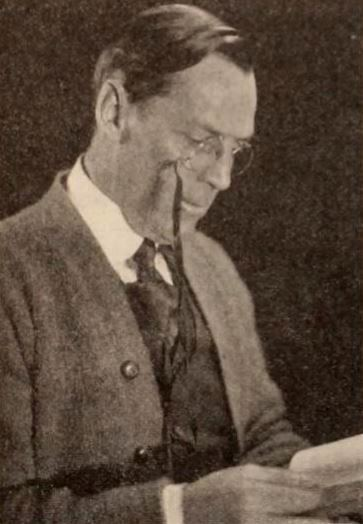
- From a 1920 magazine
- Born: June 13, 1872; Nevada, United States
- Died: May 24, 1951 (aged 78); San Francisco, California
- Occupations: screenwriter, actor, director
- Spouse: Emma Susann Heffron

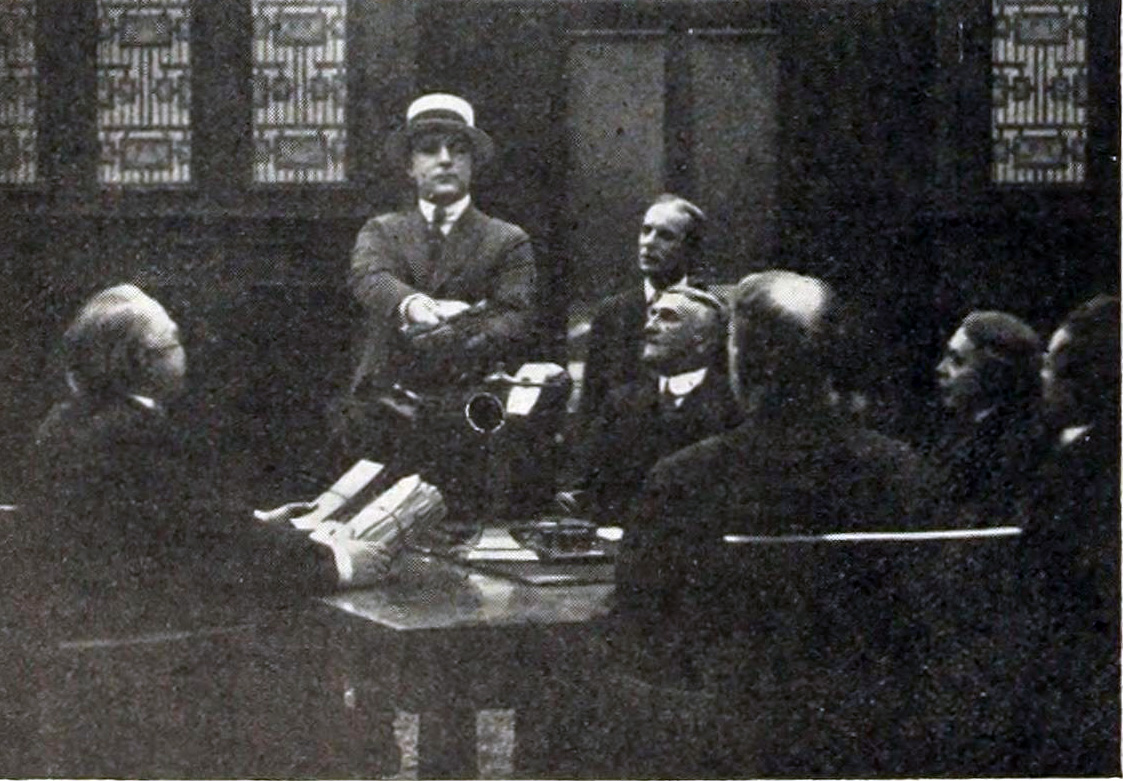
The Valiants of Virginia (1916)

Thomas N. Heffron (June 13, 1872 – May 24, 1951) was a screenwriter, actor, and a director. He was born in Nevada, He worked as an attorney and danced in vaudeville before he began his career in film with Thanhousr in 1911, eventually landing him a role with Paramount Pictures a few years later. He left the movie industry in 1922, making all his movies in the silent era.

Heffron directed films for Famous Players studio.

He died in 1951 at the age of 79 in San Francisco, California.

== Partial filmography ==
- The Brute (1914)
- The Only Son (1914)
- The Scales of Justice (1914)
- The Man from Mexico (1914)
- Aristocracy (1914)
- Mrs. Black Is Back (1914)
- The Million (1914)
- A Black Sheep (1915)
- Gretna Green (1915)
- The House of a Thousand Candles (1915)
- Are You a Mason? (1915)
- The Planter (1917)
- Mountain Dew (1917)
- The Stainless Barrier (1917)
- Tony America (1918)
- A Man's Fight (1919)
- Thou Art the Man (1920)
- The City of Masks (1920)
- The Little Clown (1921)
- Her Sturdy Oak (1921)
- A Kiss in Time (1921)
- Sham (1921)
- Her Face Value (1921)
- The Love Charm (1921)
- The Truant Husband (1921)
- Bobbed Hair (1922)
- Too Much Wife (1922)
- The Truthful Liar (1922)
- A Wife's Romance (1923)
