= In the Days of the Thundering Herd =

1914 film

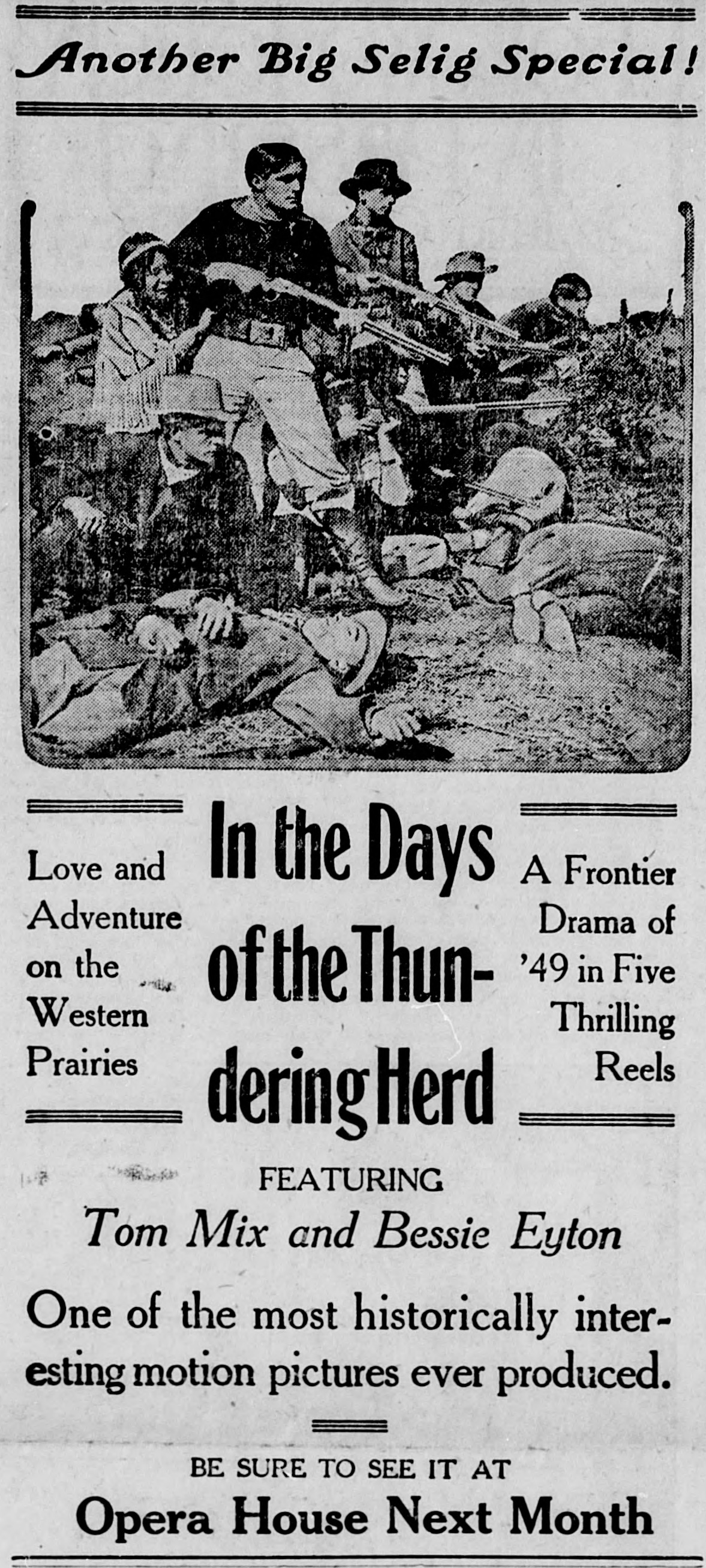
- Contemporary advertisement
- Directed by: Colin Campbell; Francis J. Grandon
- Written by: Gilson Willets
- Produced by: Selig Polyscope Company; Colonel Selig
- Starring: Tom Mix; Bessie Eyton
- Distributed by: General Film Company
- Release date: November 30, 1914
- Running time: 5 reels
- Country: United States
- Languages: Silent; English intertitles

In the Days of the Thundering Herd is a 1914 silent film western directed jointly by Colin Campbell and Francis J. Grandon. It was produced by the Selig Polyscope Company and distributed by General Film Company. This film stars Tom Mix and is representative of some of his rare surviving early features.

== Cast ==
- Tom Mix as Tom Mingle
- Bessie Eyton as Sally Madison
- Wheeler Oakman as Chief Swift Wing
- Red Wing (real name Lillian St. Cyr) as Starlight
- John Bowers as Dick Madison
- Old Blue as Tom's Horse (uncredited)
- Gordon W. Lillie as Pawnee Bill (uncredited)

In The Days Of The Thundering Herd (1914)

== Production ==
In the Days of the Thundering Herd was filmed on a buffalo ranch in Pawnee Bill, Oklahoma. Accordingly, A large number of unrestricted buffalo was used for the hunting scenes to showcase the buffalo chases of the past. The number of buffalo used in the hunting scenes is of its time because after it was skinned it costed one dollar. A reviewer, James S. McQuade, claims that Selig wanted to use extra details to correctly depict the old middle west. That included focusing on how the Native Americans of this era lived in their camps, and how their hunting was done. Many Native Americans that were a part of the tribes in Oklahoma were involved in the village scenes.

== Preservation status ==
- Prints have been preserved by the Library of Congress, George Eastman House and Academy Film Archive Beverly Hills.
