= The Girl of Gold =

1925 film

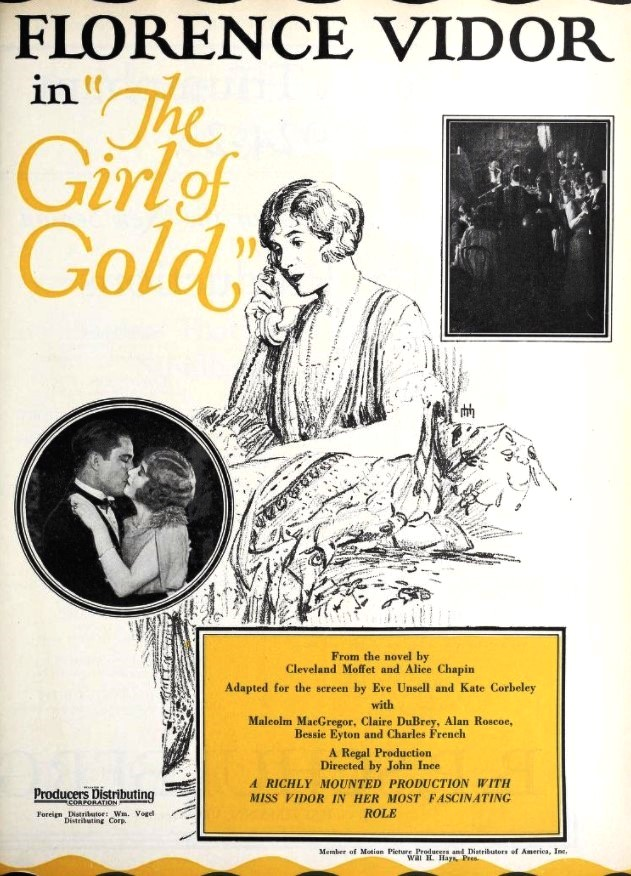
- Advertisement
- Directed by: John Ince
- Written by: Eve Unsell; Kate Corbaley (adaptation)
- Based on: "The Girl of Gold" by Cleveland Moffatt and Anna Chapin
- Produced by: Regal Pictures
- Starring: Florence Vidor
- Cinematography: James Diamond
- Edited by: Claude Berkeley
- Distributed by: Producers Distributing Corporation
- Release date: February 16, 1925
- Running time: 6 reels
- Country: United States
- Language: Silent (English intertitles)

The Girl of Gold is a 1925 American silent melodrama film directed by John Ince and starring Florence Vidor. It was released by Producers Distributing Corporation.

== Plot ==
As described in a film magazine review, Helen Marrimore, daughter of a wealthy mine owner, is dubbed “The girl of gold” by society, and snubbed by them. She attends a house party under an assumed name, and she meets Schuyler Livingstone, and sister Ada, shorn of their wealth in Wall Street. Her father meets Schuyler through a motor accident and he decides his daughter shall marry Schuyler. He consents for his sister’s sake. At a spectacular ball she gives in the mine, Schuyler and Helen are caught in a cave-in. She learns the truth about her father’s bargain. They are then rescued.

== Cast ==
- Florence Vidor as Helen Merrimore
- Malcolm McGregor as Schuyler Livingstone
- Alan Roscoe as Ned Loring
- Bessie Eyton as Ada Tremaine
- Claire Du Brey as Edith Loring
- Charles K. French as Lucius Merrimore

== Preservation ==
A copy of The Girl of Gold is preserved in a private collection and it has been released on dvd.
