= The Sea Flower =

1918 film

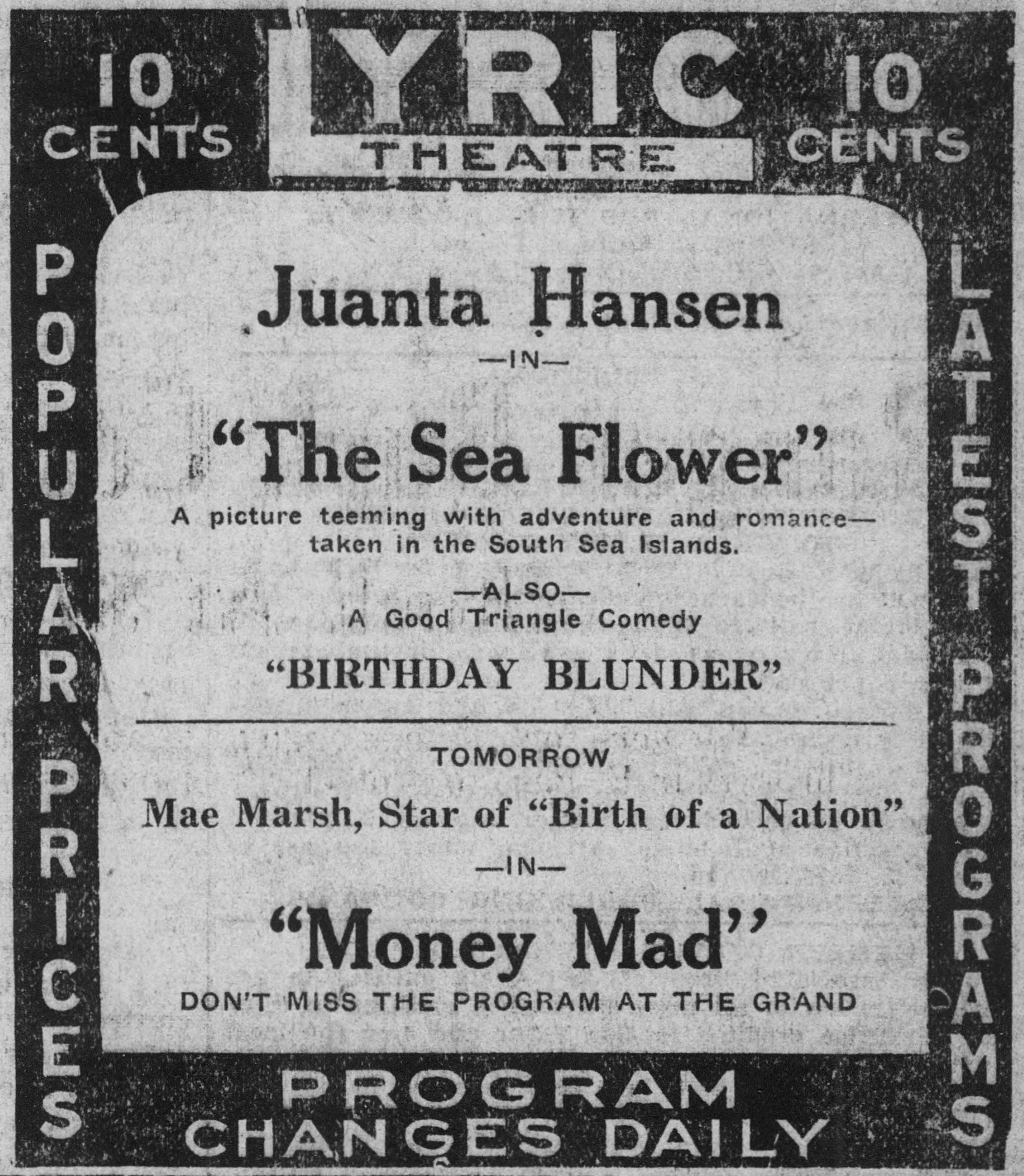
- Contemporary advertisement
- Directed by: Colin Campbell
- Written by: George C. Hull; H. Tipton Steck
- Starring: Juanita Hansen; Gayne Whitman; Fred Huntley
- Production company: Universal Pictures
- Distributed by: Universal Pictures
- Release date: December 23, 1918
- Running time: 50 minutes
- Country: United States
- Languages: Silent; English intertitles

The Sea Flower is a 1918 American silent adventure film directed by Colin Campbell and starring Juanita Hansen, Gayne Whitman and Fred Huntley. Based upon the short story by George C. Hull, Trutxon Darnley is a United States Secret Service agent disguised as a sailor on a German munitions smuggling ship. Prints of The Sea Flower exist in the Library of Congress film archive.

== Cast ==
- Juanita Hansen as Lurline
- Gayne Whitman as Truxton Darnley
- Fred Huntley as 'Brandy' Cain
- Eugenie Besserer as Kealani
- Fred Starr as Gus Olsen
- George C. Pearce as Von Linterman
- Alfred Allen as 'Gun' Fowler

== Bibliography ==
- Donald W. McCaffrey & Christopher P. Jacobs. Guide to the Silent Years of American Cinema. Greenwood Publishing, 1999.
