= Alas! Poor Yorick! =

1913 film

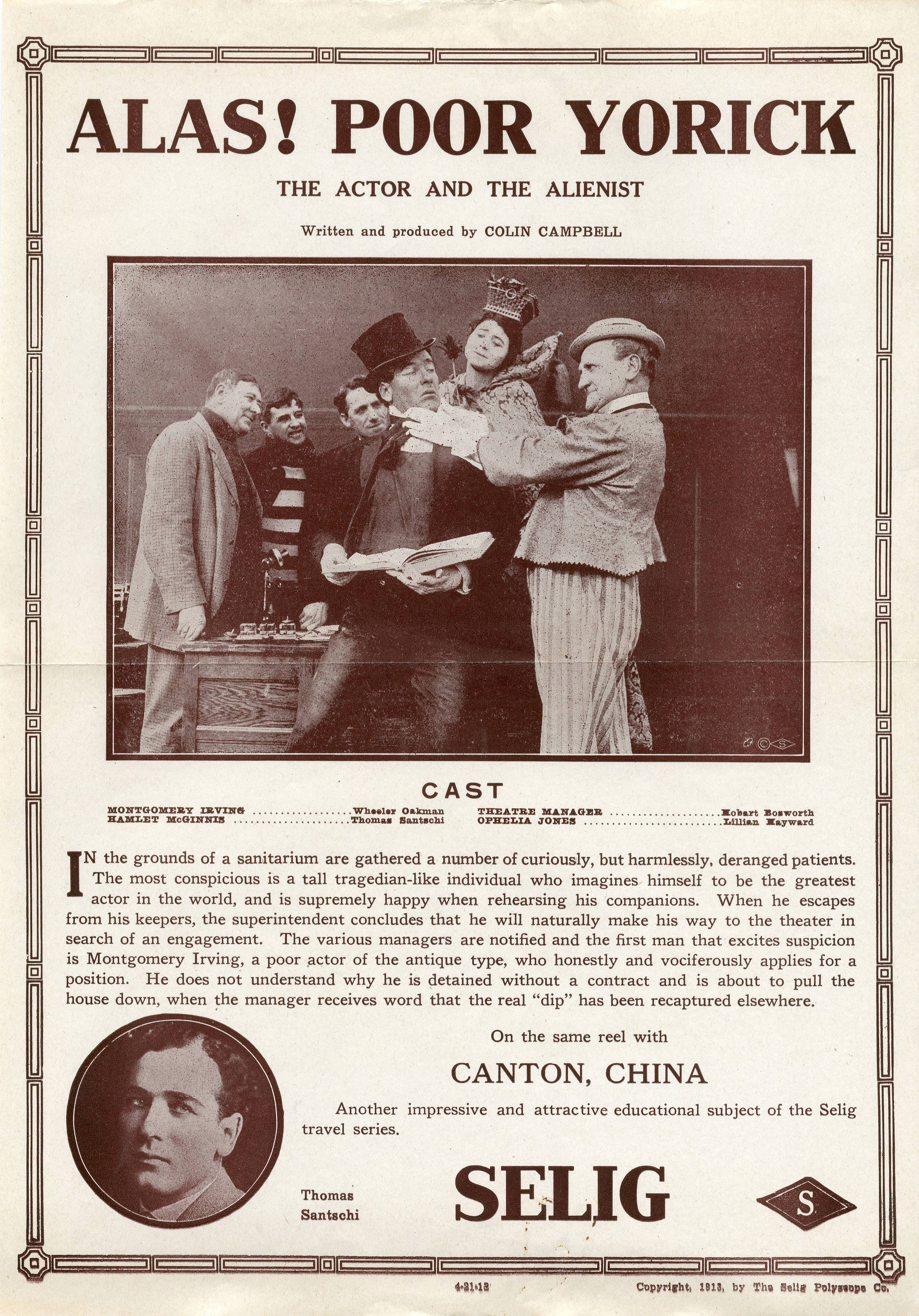
- Release flier
- Directed by: Colin Campbell
- Written by: Colin Campbell
- Starring: Wheeler Oakman; Tom Santschi; Lillian Hayward; Hobart Bosworth
- Release date: April 21, 1913
- Country: United States
- Language: Silent with English intertitles

Alas! Poor Yorick! is a 1913 American short comedy film featuring Fatty Arbuckle. The film's title is taken from the Shakespeare play Hamlet. The film was both written and directed by Colin Campbell, and was released on April 21, 1913.

== Plot ==
A patient with a psychiatric illness, who in his mind is an amazing actor, escapes from a psychiatric hospital. Every theater manager in town is notified and the first man that causes suspicion is Montgomery Irving, a poor actor in disgrace who honestly looks and acts crazy. He applies for an acting position, but doesn't understand why he is arrested without any reason. When he is about to destroy the house, the manager is informed that the real patient was captured somewhere else.

== Cast ==
- Wheeler Oakman
- Tom Santschi (as Thomas Santschi)
- Lillian Hayward
- Hobart Bosworth
- John Lancaster
- Frank Clark
- Roscoe "Fatty" Arbuckle

== See also ==
- Fatty Arbuckle filmography
