= The City of Purple Dreams (1918 film) =

1918 film directed by Colin Campbell

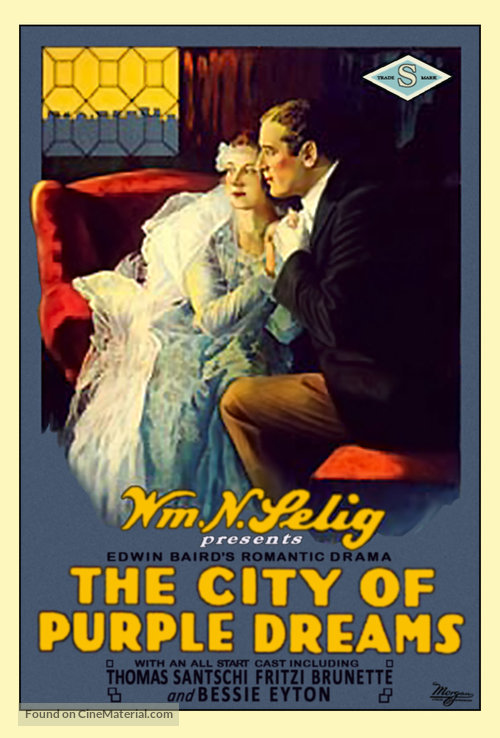
- Directed by: Colin Campbell
- Written by: Edwin Baird (novel); Gilson Willets
- Produced by: William Nicholas Selig
- Starring: Tom Santschi; Bessie Eyton; Fritzi Brunette
- Production company: Selig Polyscope Company
- Distributed by: Selig Polyscope Company
- Release date: January 10, 1918
- Running time: 7 reels
- Country: United States
- Language: Silent (English intertitles)

The City of Purple Dreams is a 1918 American silent drama film directed by Colin Campbell and starring Tom Santschi, Bessie Eyton, and Fritzi Brunette.

== Cast ==
- Tom Santschi as Daniel Fitzhugh
- Bessie Eyton as Kathlyn Otis
- Fritzi Brunette as Esther Strom
- Harry Lonsdale as Henry Hunt
- Frank Clark as Symington Otis
- Allan Sears as Olaf Nikolay
- Lafe McKee as Pat Kelly
- Fred Huntley as Thomas Quigg
- William Scott as Artie Sparkle
- Eugenie Besserer
- Cecil Holland

== Preservation ==
- The film is now lost.

== Bibliography ==
- Donald W. McCaffrey & Christopher P. Jacobs. Guide to the Silent Years of American Cinema. Greenwood Publishing, 1999. ISBN 0-313-30345-2
