= A Black Sheep =

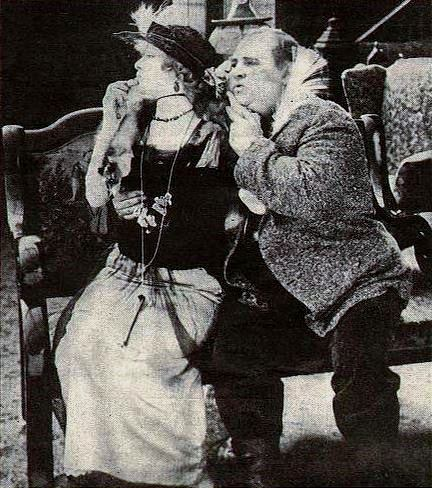
- A still from the film
- Directed by: Thomas N. Heffron
- Written by: Gilson Willets
- Based on: A Black Sheep by Charles H. Hoyt
- Starring: Otis Harlan; Rita Gould; Grace Darmond
- Production company: Selig Polyscope Company
- Distributed by: V-L-S-E
- Release date: October 18, 1915
- Running time: 5 reels
- Country: United States
- Language: Silent (English intertitles)

A Black Sheep is a 1915 silent comedy film directed by Thomas N. Heffron. It was based on the musical farce of the same name by Charles H. Hoyt

== Plot ==
The excesses of his dissipated son, Philip, bring Simeon Carruthers to the verge of financial ruin. His efforts to reform Philip prove vain; they quarrel, and the boy leaves his father's house forever. In order to recoup his fortune Carruthers proposes to the rich widow Dallas. After their marriage the widow's son, George, returns from abroad. He is a rising young novelist. Carruthers is informed by a firm of solicitors that he has been appointed a guardian of his deceased brother's daughter, Clare, who inherits a fortune. The girl comes to live with him. and he determines that she shall marry Philip, for whom detectives, hired by him, are searching the city. Philip has fallen in with Stewart Routh, a gambler, whose pretty wife, Harriet, is of great assistance to him in fleecing young men. The gamblers cheat Philip of all his money, and when he discovers the trick, propose that he enter into partnership with them. He accepts and becomes active in the business. Clare falls in love with George, a circumstance which so displeases Carruthers that he plans to get rid of the novelist. He contrives to make George appear guilty of having stolen his pocketbook, and orders him from the house. George's novel is accepted and he receives advance royalties. He falls in with Philip, who introduces him to the Rouths. The partners cheat him at cards. He takes his loss so heavily that Philip pities him and returns his money. The Rouths do not approve of this, and a quarrel ensues, as a result of which Stewart Routh kills Philip. Suspicion is fastened upon George, and he is arrested. Clare, visiting him in prison, learns that he, coming upon the scene after the murder, found a button clasped in Philip's hand. She is on her way to question the Rouths when she meets a Salvation Army collector of old clothing, who has just received from the gambler's wife an overcoat with a button missing. The button matches those on the coat. As the police enter Routh's apartment he commits suicide. George is cleared.

== Cast ==
- Otis Harlan as Goodrich Mudd
- Rita Gould as Lida
- Grace Darmond as Ada Steele
- John Charles as Jarvis Smith
- James Bradbury Sr. as Loudclothes
- Johan D. Murphy as Underdog
- Fred Morley as Barkeeper
- Lou Kelso as Treasurer
- Jack Rollens as Percy Vere
- Emma Glenwood as the Spider

== Reception ==
A contemporary review in the Jackson Daily News was positive claiming that the film had a "laugh in every inch".

A review in the Duluth News Tribune praised Harlan's performance.
