= The Princess of Patches =

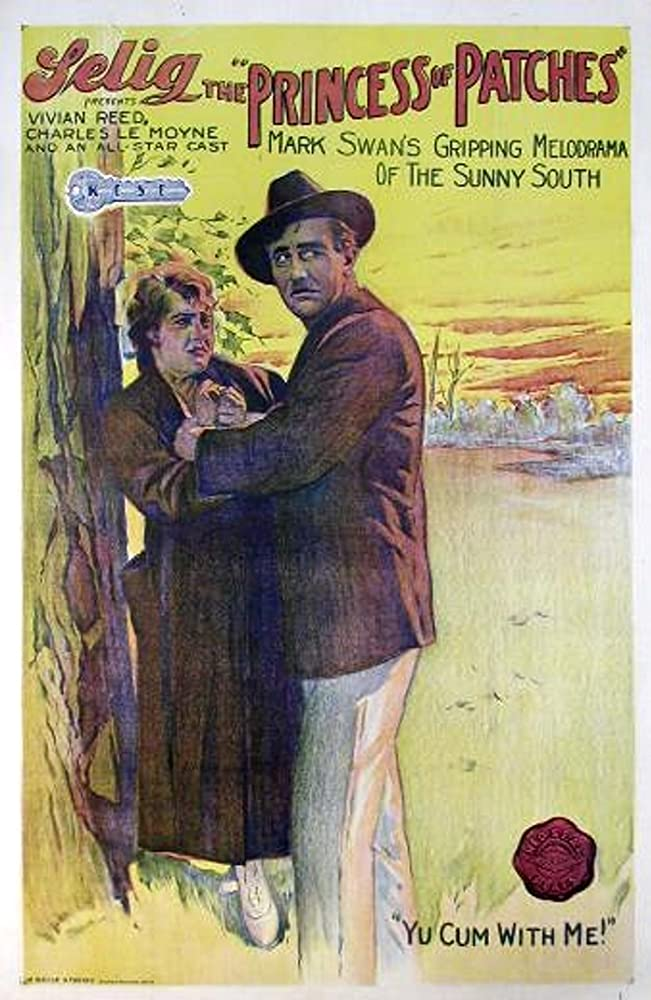
- Directed by: Alfred E. Green
- Written by: Mark Swan (play); Gilson Willets
- Starring: Violet De Biccari; Vivian Reed; Burke Wilbur
- Production company: Selig Polyscope Company
- Distributed by: K-E-S-E Service
- Release date: January 22, 1917
- Running time: 50 minutes
- Country: United States
- Languages: Silent; English intertitles

The Princess of Patches is a 1917 American silent drama film directed by Alfred E. Green and starring Violet De Biccari, Vivian Reed and Burke Wilbur.

== Cast ==
- Violet De Biccari as The Princess of Patches
- Vivian Reed as The Princess of Patches
- Burke Wilbur as Jack Merry
- Hildor Hoberg as Colonel Silverthorne
- Roy Southerland as Lee Silverthorne
- Cora Lambert as Juliet
- Frank Weed as Waggles
- Charles Le Moyne as Judas
- Maude Baker as Liza Biggs
- R.H. Kelly as The Sheriff

== Bibliography ==
- James Robert Parish & Michael R. Pitts. Film directors: a guide to their American films. Scarecrow Press, 1974.
