= Outlawed (1929 film) =

1929 film

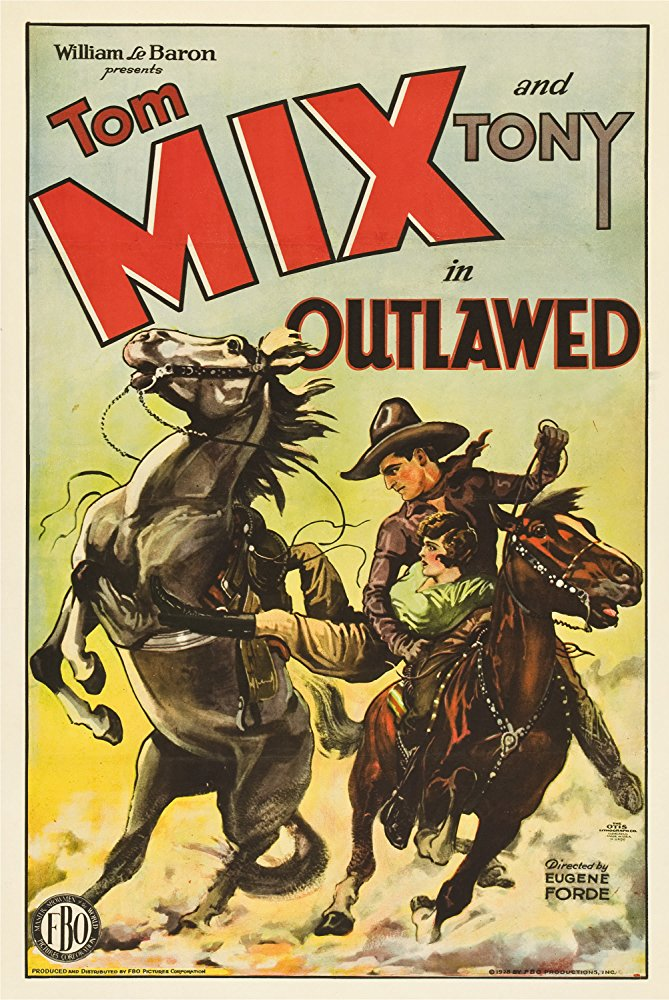
- Directed by: Eugene Forde
- Written by: George W. Pyper; Helen Gregg
- Produced by: William LeBaron
- Starring: Tom Mix; Sally Blane; Frank Clark
- Cinematography: Norman Devol
- Edited by: Henry Weber
- Production company: FBO
- Distributed by: FBO
- Release date: January 21, 1929
- Running time: 70 minutes
- Country: United States
- Languages: Silent; English intertitles

Outlawed is a 1929 American silent Western film directed by Eugene Forde and starring Tom Mix, Sally Blane and Frank Clark. A complete copy of the film survives.

== Cast ==
- Tom Mix as Tom Manning
- Tony the Horse as Tony - Tom's Horse
- Sally Blane as Anne
- Frank Clark as Seth
- Albert J. Smith as Dervish
- Ethan Laidlaw as McCasky
- Barney Furey as Sagebrush
- Al Ferguson as Sheriff

== Bibliography ==
- Jensen, Richard D. The Amazing Tom Mix: The Most Famous Cowboy of the Movies. 2005.
