= Jack McDonald (actor) =

American actor (1880–1962)

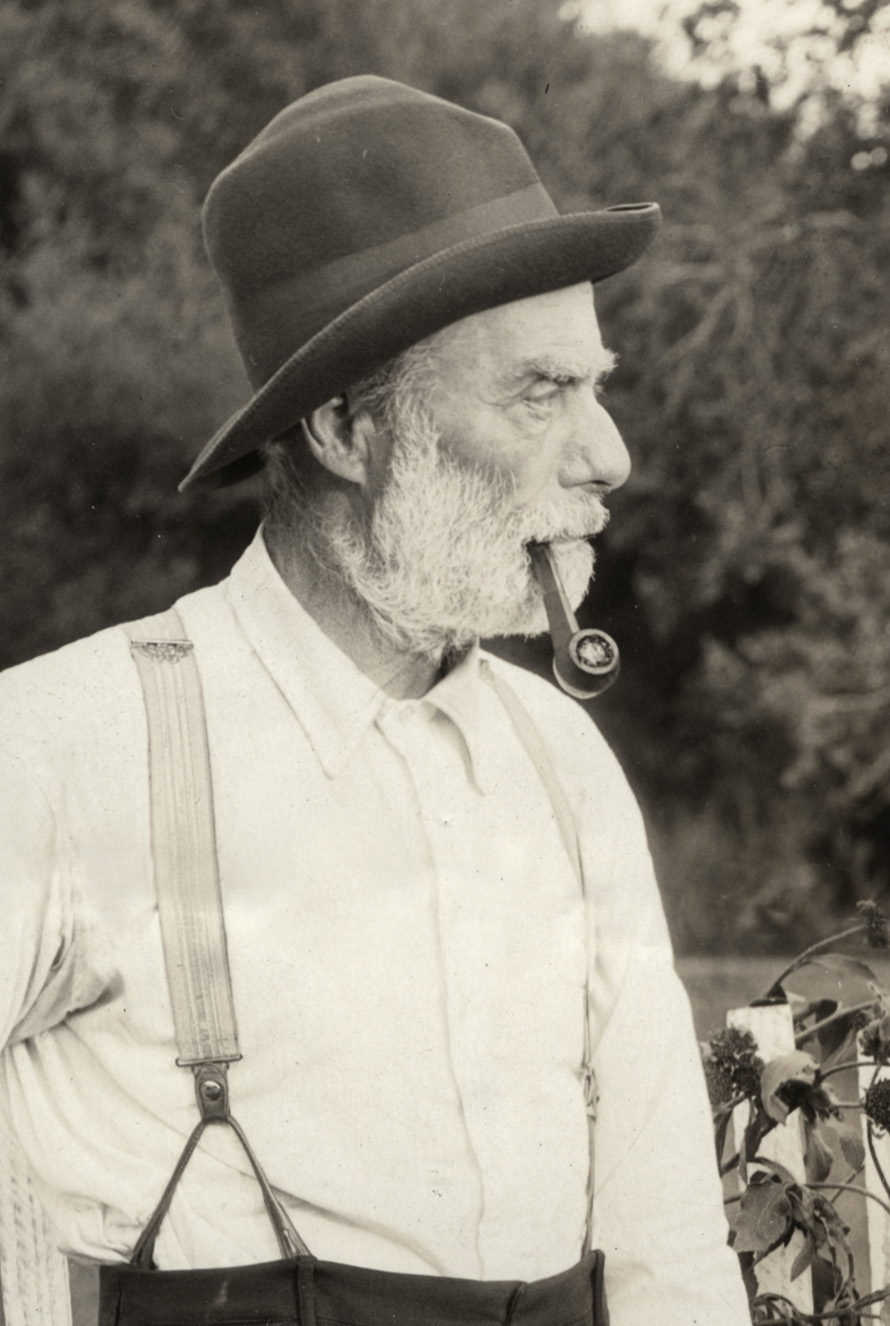
- McDonald in Better Times, 1919
- Born: September 17, 1880; San Francisco, California, United States
- Died: 1962 (aged 81–82); Sacramento, California, United States
- Occupation: Actor
- Years active: 1912-1930

Jack McDonald (September 17, 1880 – 1962) was an American actor of the silent era. He appeared in more than 70 films between 1912 and 1930. He was born in San Francisco, California.

== Partial filmography ==
- Shotgun Jones (1914)
- A Just Punishment (1914)
- Chip of the Flying U (1914)
- Rebecca of Sunnybrook Farm (1917)
- One Touch of Sin (1917)
- The Girl of My Dreams (1918)
- Better Times (1919)
- The Last of the Mohicans (1920)
- Ladies Must Live (1921)
- The Big Punch (1921)
- The Bait (1921)
- Singing River (1921)
- The World's a Stage (1922)
- Main Street (1923)
- Cameo Kirby (1923)
- The Circus Cowboy (1924)
- Against All Odds (1924)
- Greed (1924)
- Don Q, Son of Zorro (1925)
- Champion of Lost Causes (1925)
- The Interferin' Gent (1927)
- The Dove (1927)
- The Phantom City (1928)
- The Whip (1928)
- Show Boat (1929)
- The Ship from Shanghai (1930)
- Big Money (1930)
