= The Heart of Texas Ryan =

1917 film

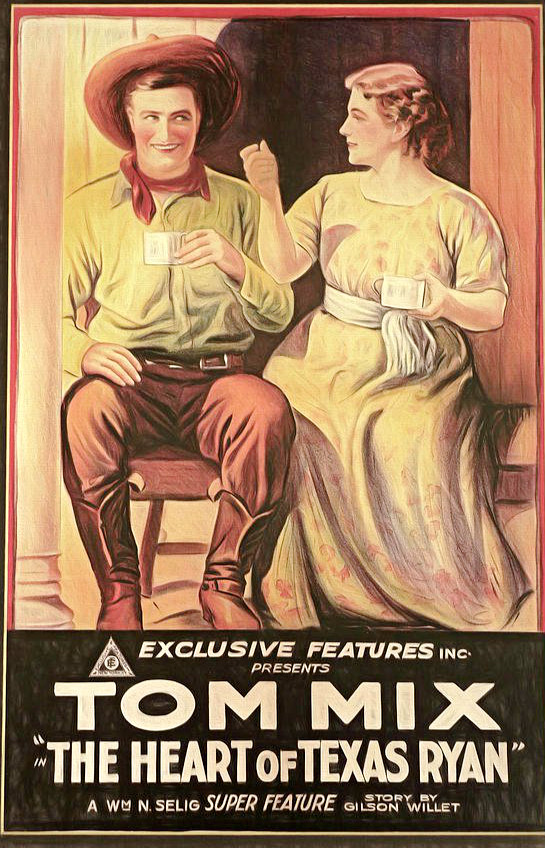
- Directed by: E. A. Martin
- Written by: Gilson Willets (scenario)
- Produced by: William N. Selig
- Starring: Tom Mix; Bessie Eyton
- Production company: Selig Polyscope Company
- Distributed by: K-E-S-E Service; Exclusive Features Inc. (1923 re-release)
- Release date: February 26, 1917
- Running time: 56 minutes
- Country: United States
- Languages: Silent; English intertitles

The Heart of Texas Ryan.

The Heart of Texas Ryan, aka The Light of Western Stars, is a 1917 American silent Western film starring Tom Mix and Bessie Eyton and directed by E.A. Martin. The film was produced by Sanford Productions. It is Tom Mix's first feature-length film. The film was re-released in 1923 as Single Shot Parker, a title by which it is sometimes called when marketed on home video and DVD.

== Plot ==
The story centers on a love relationship between sharpshooting cowboy Jack "One Shot" Parker and Texas Ryan.

== Cast ==
- Tom Mix as Jack Parker
- Bessie Eyton as Texas Ryan
- George Fawcett as Colonel William Ryan
- Frank Campeau as Dice McAllister
- William Ryno as Antonio Moreno (* as William Rhino)
- Charles K. Gerrard as Senator J. Murray (* as Charles Gerrard)
- Goldie Colwell as Marion Smith

== Preservation ==
A 35 mm print of The Heart of Texas Ryan is held by George Eastman House.

== See also ==
- Tom Mix filmography
