= B. M. Bower =

American novelist

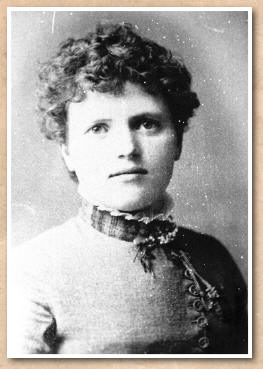
- Portrait of B. M. Bower, circa 1890
- Born: Bertha Muzzy; November 15, 1871
- Died: July 23, 1940 (aged 68)
- Occupation: Author
- Notable work: Chip of the Flying U

Bertha Muzzy Sinclair or Sinclair-Cowan, née Muzzy (November 15, 1871 – July 23, 1940), best known by her pseudonym B. M. Bower, was an American author who wrote novels, fictional short stories, and screenplays about the American Old West. Her works, featuring cowboys and cows of the Flying U Ranch in Montana, reflected "an interest in ranch life, the use of working cowboys as main characters (even in romantic plots), the occasional appearance of eastern types for the sake of contrast, a sense of western geography as simultaneously harsh and grand, and a good deal of factual attention to such matters as cattle branding and bronc busting." She was married three times: to Clayton Bower in 1890, to Bertrand William Sinclair (also a Western author) in 1905, and to Robert Elsworth Cowan in 1921. However, she chose to publish under the name Bower.

== Biography ==
=== Early life ===
Born Bertha Muzzy in Otter Tail County, Minnesota, to Washington Muzzy and Eunice Miner Muzzy, Bower moved with her family to a dryland homestead near Great Falls, Montana, in 1889. That fall, just before her eighteenth birthday, she began teaching school in nearby Milligan Valley. The school was a small, hastily converted log outbuilding, and she taught twelve pupils. Her experiences as a teacher informed the characters of schoolma'ams who appear frequently in her in the writings, notably in The North Wind Do Blow (1937), in which a young, eastern-born schoolma'am teaches her first term in central Montana. After one term as a schoolteacher, Bower returned to her family's homestead.

=== Marriages ===
On December 21, 1890, Bower shocked her family by eloping with her first husband, Clayton J. Bower. Their marriage was unhappy. The newlyweds lived first with the Muzzy family, moving later to Great Falls and then to Big Sandy, Montana, in 1898. Her experiences in Big Sandy gave her intimate knowledge of cowboy life on the open range. Bower gave birth to three children during her marriage to Clayton: Bertha Grace in 1891, Harold Clayton in 1893, and Roy Noel in 1896. Eventually, Clayton moved the family to a lonely hayfield cabin, which Bower nicknamed "Bleak Cabin," about a mile out of Big Sandy. To help with rent, the Bowers accepted a boarder named Bill Sinclair. Sinclair, aged twenty-two, was nine years younger than Bower, but nevertheless a partnership began between them. Bower lent books to Sinclair and tutored him in writing while he helped her understand the finer points of cowpunching and critiqued the Western stories she had begun to write.

In the meantime, Bower's first marriage had deteriorated. After Bower had published Chip of the Flying U, her husband had begun to call her "my little red-headed gold mine." The final break came after he arrived home in a drunken rage. With Sinclair's help and with money from the sale of Chip of the Flying U, Bower moved to Tacoma, Washington, to stay with her brother Chip and his wife Elvina. The divorce was finalized in 1905. Clayton took custody of Bertha Grace and Harry, while Bower moved back to Great Falls and took custody of Roy. Throughout this difficult time, Bower continued to advance her career, signing her first short-story writing contract for Popular Magazine in January 1905.

Bower and Sinclair married on August 13, 1905, at the Great Falls Methodist-Episcopal Church. They rented a two-story home at 111 Sixth Street North where they both focused on their writing careers. A daughter, Della Frances Sinclair, was born during a blizzard on January 24, 1907. That same hard winter destroyed the Sinclairs' breeding horse herd on land in eastern Valley County where they had hoped to move in the spring. After losing their herd, Bower and Sinclair left Montana for good and moved south and settled in a house on the coast in Santa Cruz, California. Both Bower and Sinclair continued to pursue successful careers as writers over the course of several moves to various houses in California. However, by late summer, 1911, Bower had separated from Sinclair and rented a house in San Jose, California. She also changed publishers, signing with the prestigious Boston publishing house Little, Brown & Company in August 1911.

In 1920, Bower moved to Hollywood and married her third husband, Robert "Bud" Cowan, a cowboy who she had met in Big Sandy. In 1921, Bower and Cowan reopened a silver mine in Nevada and operated it for several years until the Great Depression forced them to move again, this time to Depoe Bay, Oregon. Their marriage lasted until Cowan's death in 1939. Bower did not remarry again.

=== Writing career ===
Bower began writing to "save my sanity" after moving to Big Sandy with her first husband. Seeking financial independence from Clayton, she began sending stories to publishers in 1900. She regularly wrote new material while continuing to send out her old stories once a month. Bower published her first short story, "Strike of the Dishpan Brigade," locally in 1901. Her first short story to be published nationally, "Ghost in the Red Shirt," appeared in Lippincott’s Magazine in 1904.

Later that year, Bower published her first Western novel, Chip of the Flying U, as a serial in Popular Magazine by Street & Smith. The book introduced readers to the fictional Flying U Ranch and the "Happy Family" of cowboys who lived there. The story line centers on a cowboy named Chip and his relationship with Dr. Della Whitmore, a self-reliant doctor from the East who "can shoot a coyote, laugh off a hazing, doctor a horse, and turn cowboys into pediatric orderlies." Their relationship begins coldly when Della takes credit for a painting done by Chip. But they fall in love after Della restores credit to Chip and after Chip rescues Della from a runaway horse. The book was so popular that it was re-released in hardcover in 1906 with three watercolor illustrations by famed painter Charlie Russell. Chip of the Flying U rocketed Bower to fame, and she wrote an entire series of novels set at the Flying U Ranch.

Bower went on to write 57 Western novels. She died in July 1940 in Los Angeles, California, at the age of 68. By the time of her death, her books had sold more than two million copies, not counting her many short stories and articles.

According to Elmer Kelton, Bower's sales dropped when it was revealed that she was female.

=== Hollywood ===
Several of Bower's novels were turned into films. Chip of the Flying U was adapted for film four times; however, each of these films significantly altered Bower's narrative. Bower also collaborated with director Colin Campbell, writing stories and screenplays for seven Westerns under the name Bertha Muzzy Sinclair, including the 1921 film The Wolverine. She developed friendships with Gary Cooper and Tom Mix. Mix starred in the first adaptation of Chip of the Flying U (1914) as well as in three other films written by Bower: When the Cook Fell Ill (1914), The Lonesome Trail (1914), and Weary Goes A’Wooing (1915). Bower used her experiences working within the studio system as the source material for several novels, including Jean of the Lazy A (1915), The Heritage of the Sioux (1915), The Phantom Herd (1916), and The Quirt (1920).

== Writing style ==
Bower's novels have been praised for their accurate portrayal of cowboy life. She wrote factually about such things as cattle branding and bronc busting, having witnessed these events firsthand. Bower's West is a place of change in which characters embrace new technologies from barbed wire to Kodak cameras. She infused her novels with humor. Her cowboys lightheartedly josh each other, and readers are invited to laugh at the ironic situations in which her characters are entangled. There is little violence in Bower's writing. In Chip of the Flying U, the eponymous character does not even carry a six-shooter. Instead, Bower's writing is characterized by a lighthearted, pleasant mood. For example, in describing a ranch kitchen, she imagines a tea kettle "singing placidly to itself and puffing steam with an air of lazy comfort, as if it were smoking a cigarette."

Reviewers praised Bower for her use of "chaste English," her "true-to-life fiction," her "real background of life among the bow-legged brethren," and her "playful, humorous vein." A 1922 New York Times review stated: "there has always been an authenticity about them, a genuine smell of sagebrush and saddle leather, which many of her pretentious rivals lack. Her humor, too, is native and unforced, and lingers in the mind."

Both readers and reviewers frequently assumed that Bower was a man. In 1926, a reviewer for The New York Times called Bower "a strong but not altogether silent man who, during the intermissions in his professional duties, has found time to write thirty-four books." Other reviewers dodged the question entirely by replacing the pronouns he or she with such vague epithets as "this veteran novelist."

== Works ==
- Adam Chasers: 1927
- The Bellehelen Mine: 1924
- Black Thunder: 1926
- Border Vengeance: 1951 (Ghost written by Oscar Friend)
- Cabin Fever: 1918
- Casey Ryan: 1921
- Chip of the Flying U: 1906
- Cow Country: 1921
- Dark Horse: 1931
- Desert Brew: 1925
- The Dry Ridge Gang: 1935
- The Eagle's Wing: 1924
- The Family Failing: 1941
- Five Furies of Leaning Ladder: 1936
- Flying U Ranch: 1914
- The Flying U Strikes: 1933
- The Flying U's Last Stand: 1915
- Fool's Goal: 1930
- Good Indian: 1912
- The Gringos: 1913
- The Happy Family: 1910
- The Haunted Hills: 1934
- Hay Wire: 1928
- Her Prairie Knight: 1909
- The Heritage of the Sioux: 1916
- Jean Of The Lazy 'A': 1915
- Laughing Water: 1932
- Lonesome Land: 1912
- The Lonesome Trail: 1909
- The Long Loop: 1931
- The Long Shadow: 1909
- The Lookout Man: 1917
- The Lure of the Dim Trails: 1907
- Man on Horseback: 1940
- Meadowlark Basin: 1925
- The North Wind Do Blow: 1937
- Open Land: 1933
- Outlaw Moon: 1952 (Ghost written by Oscar Friend)
- The Parowan Bonanza: 1923
- The Phantom Herd: 1916
- Pirates of the Range: 1937
- Points West: 1928
- The Quirt: 1920
- The Ranch at the Wolverine: 1914
- The Range Dwellers: 1906
- Rim O' the World: 1919
- Rocking Arrow: 1932
- Rodeo: 1928
- Rowdy of the Cross L: 1907
- Shadow Mountain: 1936
- The Singing Hill: 1939
- Sky Rider: 1918
- Spirit of the Range: 1940
- Starr of the Desert: 1917
- A Starry Night: 1939
- The Swallowfork Bulls: 1929
- Sweet Grass: 1940
- The Thunder Bird: 1919
- Tiger Eye: 1930
- The Trail of the White Mule: 1922
- Trails Meet: 1933
- Trouble Rides the Wind: 1935
- The Uphill Climb: 1913
- Van Patten: 1926
- The Voice at Johnny Water: 1923
- White Wolves: 1927
- The Whoop-Up Trail: 1933
- The Wind Blows West: 1938
