= Fred Huntley =

American actor

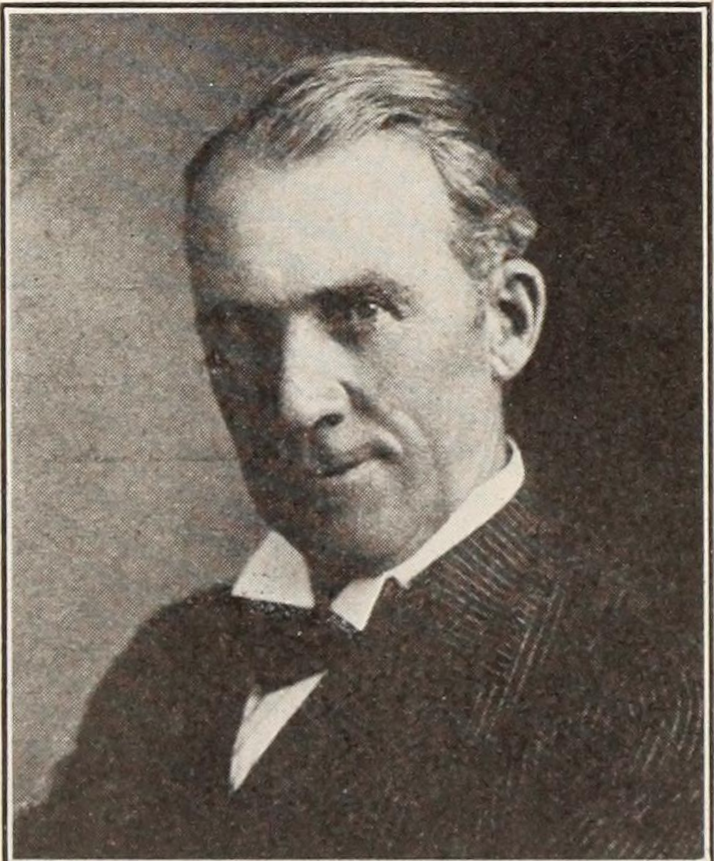
- Fred Huntley c. 1920
- Born: 29 August 1862; London, England
- Died: 1 November 1931 (aged 69); Hollywood, California U.S.
- Occupations: Actor; Film director
- Years active: 1911–1927

Fred Huntley (29 August 1862 in London, England – 1 November 1931 in Hollywood, California) was an English silent film actor and director.

Fred Huntley made his theater debut at London's Covent Garden in 1879. After years as the leading man with the Carleton Opera Company, Huntley entered the film business as a writer and director for the Selig Polyscope Company in 1912.

== Filmography ==
As an Actor
Year	Title	Role	Notes
1911	The Still Alarm		
1911	The Herders		
1911	Stability vs. Nobility		
1911	The Novice		
1911	Told in the Sierras		
1911	The New Faith		
1911	The White Medicine Man	Medicine Man	
1911	It Happened in the West		
1911	The Profligate		
1911	The Old Captain		
1911	Slick's Romance		
1911	Their Only Son		
1911	A Turkish Cigarette		
1911	The Regeneration of Apache Kid		
1911	The Blacksmith's Love		
1911	The Rival Stage Lines		
1911	The Artist's Sons		
1911	Making a Man of Him		
1911	On Separate Paths		
1911	Captain Brand's Wife		
1911	The Coquette		
1911	Old Billy		
1911	Lieutenant Grey of the Confederacy		
1911	The Bootlegger		
1911	The New Superintendent		
1911	The Convent of San Clemente		
1911	Blackbeard		
1911	An Evil Power		
1911	A Diamond in the Rough		
1911	The Maid at the Helm		
1911	The Little Widow		
1911	A Modern Rip		
1912	The Secret Wedding		
1912	Merely a Millionaire		
1912	The Test		
1912	Bunkie		
1912	Disillusioned		
1912	The Danites		
1912	A Crucial Test		
1912	The Ones Who Suffer		
1912	The Hobo		
1912	A Waif of the Sea		
1912	Tenderfoot Bob's Regeneration		
1912	The End of the Romance		
1912	A Humble Hero		
1912	A Child of the Wilderness		
1912	The Substitute Model		
1912	Monte Cristo	Abbe Faria	as Fred Huntly
1912	A Sad Devil		
1912	When Helen Was Elected		
1912	Opitsah: Apache for Sweetheart		
1913	The Story of Lavinia		
1913	Greater Wealth		
1913	The Three Wise Men		
1913	The Early Bird		
1914	Willie		
1914	Chip of the Flying U	Old Man	
1914	Ye Vengeful Vagabonds		
1914	Hearts and Masks		
1914	The Wasp	Joe Collins	
1914	The Broken 'X'		
1915	Retribution		
1915	Poetic Justice of Omar Khan		
1915	The Carpet from Bagdad	Wallace	
1915	The Rosary	Evarts	
1915	The Circular Staircase	Detective Jamieson	as Fred Huntly
1915	A Janitor's Wife's Temptation		
1916	Fighting Blood	Henry Colby, Her Father	
1916	The Ne'er Do Well	Andres Garavel	
1916	A Man of Sorrow		
1916	The Fires of Conscience	Peter Rogers	
1917	The Marcellini Millions	Mr. Hargrave	
1917	A Roadside Impresario	John Slade	
1918	The City of Purple Dreams	Thomas Quigg	
1918	Rimrock Jones	Leon Lockhart	
1918	The Only Road	Ramon Lupo	
1918	Johanna Enlists	Pa Rensaller	
1918	A Lady's Name	Adams	
1918	The Sea Flower	'Brandy' Cain	
1919	The Heart of Wetona	Chief Quannah	
1919	Johnny Get Your Gun	Jevne	
1919	For Better, for Worse	Colonial Soldier	
1919	Fires of Faith	Joe Lee	
1919	Daddy-Long-Legs		uncredited
1919	Love Insurance	Jenkins	
1919	Her Kingdom of Dreams	Parker	
1919	The Lottery Man	Hamilton	
1919	Heart o' the Hills	Granpap Jason Hawn	as Fred W. Huntley
1919	Everywoman	Dissipation	
1920	Excuse My Dust	Police Magistrate	uncredited
1920	The Sea Wolf	Old Man Johnson	
1920	The Soul of Youth	Mr. Hodge	
1920	The Round-Up	Sagebrush Charlie	
1920	Behold My Wife!	Chief Eye-of-the-Moon	as Fred Huntly
1920	Dice of Destiny	'Gloomy' Cole	as Frederick Huntly
1921	Brewster's Millions	Mr. Brewster	
1921	What Every Woman Knows	David Wylie	as Fred Huntly
1921	The Bronze Bell	Maharajah	
1921	A Wise Fool	Sebastian Dolores	
1921	Gasoline Gus		
1921	The Face of the World	Attorney Gundahl	
1921	The Affairs of Anatol	Stage Manager	(uncredited)
1921	A Prince There Was	Mr. Cricket	
1921	The Little Minister	Peter Tosh	as Fred Huntly
1922	The Man with Two Mothers	Butler	as Fred Huntly
1922	The Crimson Challenge	Confora	as Fred Huntly
1922	North of the Rio Grande	Briston	
1922	While Satan Sleeps	Absolom Randall	
1922	Borderland	William Beckett	
1922	To Have and to Hold	Paradise	
1922	Peg o' My Heart	Butler	as Fred Huntly
1923	The Go-Getter	Jack Morgan	
1923	Law of the Lawless	Osman	
1923	Where the North Begins	Scotty McTavish	
1923	To the Last Man	Lee Jorth	
1923	The Call of the Canyon	Tom Hutter	
1924	The Mine with the Iron Door		
1924	Thundering Hoofs	John Marshall	
1924	The Age of Innocence		
1927	The King of Kings	Undetermined	Uncredited
