= Colin Campbell (director) =

American film director

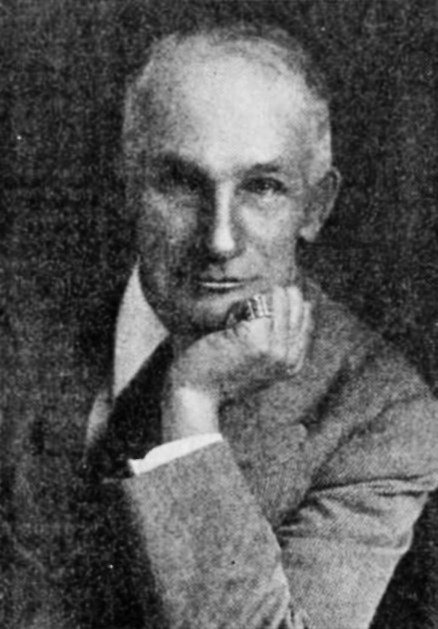
- Born: 11 October 1859; Scotland, United Kingdom
- Died: 26 August 1928 (aged 68); Hollywood, California, United States
- Occupation: Film director
- Years active: 1911–1924

James Colin Campbell (11 October 1859 – 26 August 1928) was a film director, actor and screenwriter. He directed more than 170 American films between 1911 and 1924; and wrote scripts for 60 films between 1911 and 1922. He was born in Scotland, and died in Hollywood, California.

Campbell married actress Blanche Crozier on March 2, 1912.

== Selected filmography ==
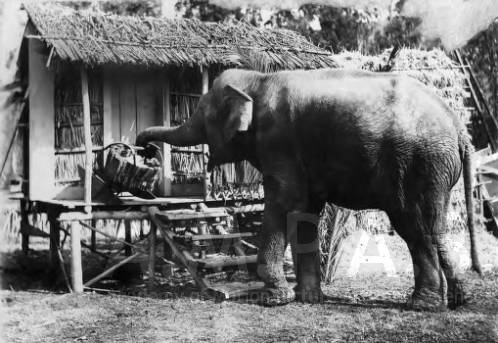
An elephant picks up a basket with its trunk. Set photograph from the film A Wise Old Elephant directed by Colin Campbell (1913), Margaret Herrick Library.

- Brown of Harvard (1911)
- An Assisted Elopement (1912)
- The Count of Monte Cristo (1912)
- Alas! Poor Yorick! (1913)
- A Wise Old Elephant (1913)
- Wamba A Child of the Jungle (1913)
- The Spoilers (1914)
- Shotgun Jones (1914)
- Chip of the Flying U (1914)
- The Rosary (1915)
- The Carpet from Bagdad (1915)
- Sweet Alyssum (1915)
- Tillie's Tomato Surprise (1915)
- Thou Shalt Not Covet (1916)
- The Garden of Allah (1916)
- Gloria's Romance (1916)
- The Crisis (1916)
- Beware of Strangers (1917)
- Who Shall Take My Life? (1917)
- The Sea Flower (1918)
- The City of Purple Dreams (1918)
- The Yellow Dog (1918)
- The Still Alarm (1918)
- The Beauty Market (1919)
- The Railroader (1919)
- The Thunderbolt (1919)
- Moon Madness (1920)
- When Dawn Came (1920)
- The Corsican Brothers (1920)
- The First Born (1921)
- Where Lights Are Low (1921)
- The Lure of Jade (1921)
- The Swamp (1921)
- A Man of Stone (1921)
- "Black Roses" (1921)
- The World's a Stage (1922)
- The Buster (1923)
- Three Who Paid (1923)
- The Bowery Bishop (1924)
- The White Monkey (1925)
