= A Change of Administration =

A Change in Administration
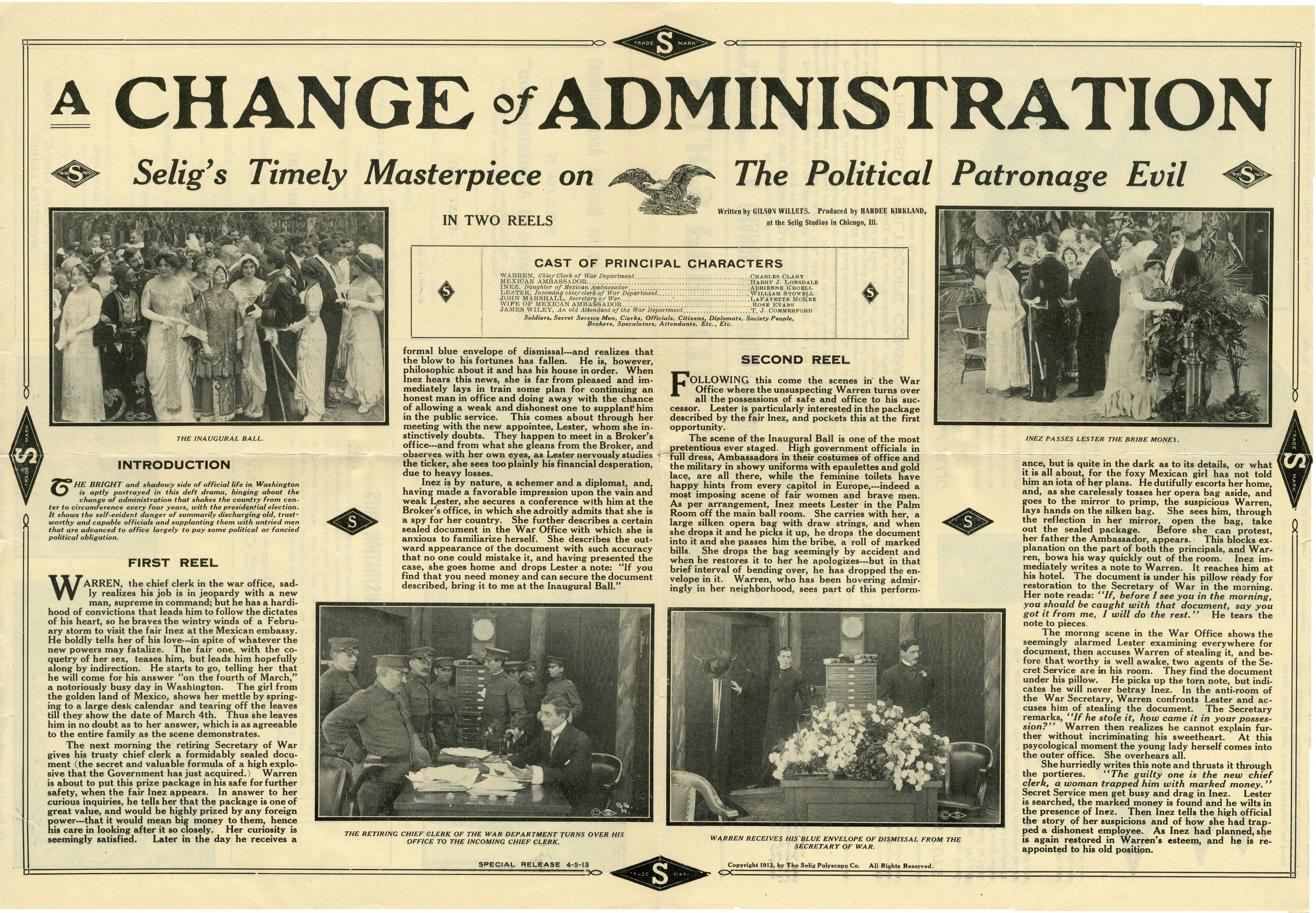
- Release flier
- Written by: Gilson Willets
- Produced by: Hardee Kirkland
- Starring: Charles Clary; Harry J. Lonsdale; Adrienne Kroell; William Stowell
- Distributed by: Selig Polyscope Company
- Release date: April 5, 1913 (U.S.)
- Running time: 1 reel
- Country: United States
- Languages: Silent; English intertitles

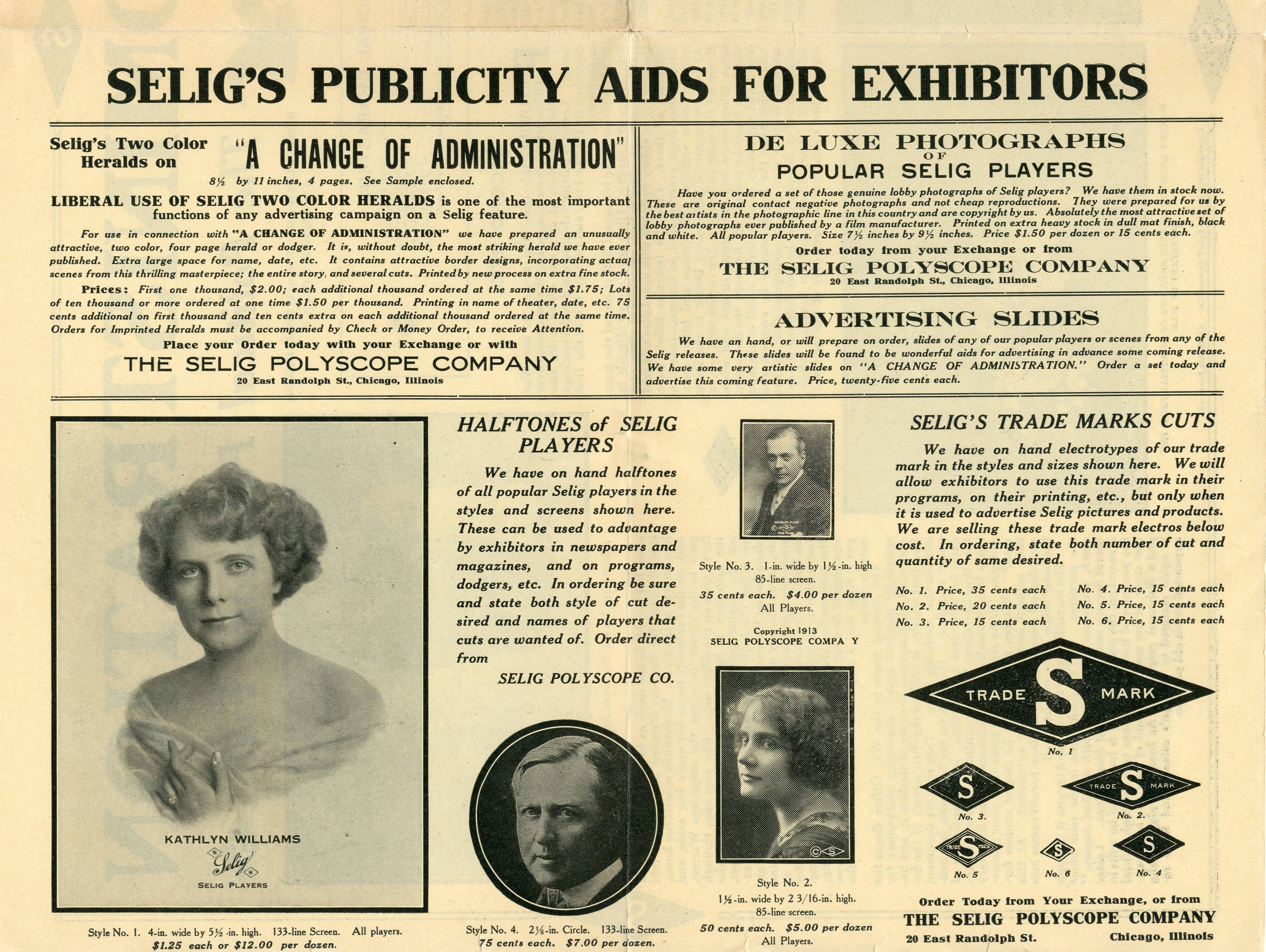
Page 2 of the press sheet

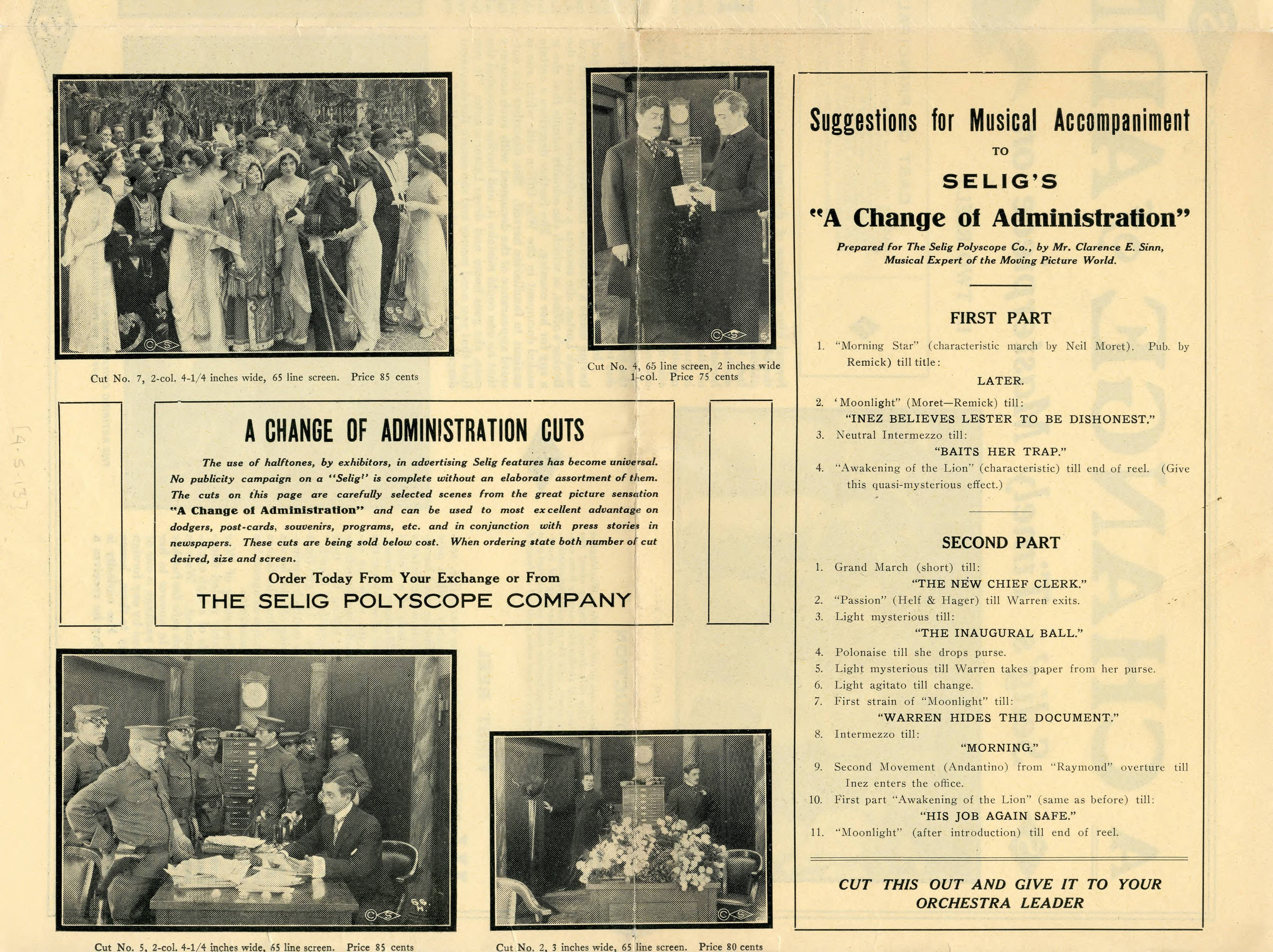
Page 3 of the press sheet

A Change in Administration is a 1913 American silent film drama produced by Lorimer Johnson. The film stars Charles Clary, Adrienne Kroell, Harry Lonsdale, and William Stowell. The film status is uncertain but a release flier survives which is now at the Margaret Herrick Library at the Academy of Motion Pictures Arts and Sciences, it was part of the Charles G. Clarke collection. It was released on April 5, 1913 with two reels.

== Plot ==
Warren, the chief clerk in the war office sadly realizes his job is in jeopardy with a new hood of convictions that leads him to follow the dictates of his heart, so he braves the wintry winds of a February storm to visit the fair Iñez at the Mexican embassy. He boldly tells her of his love—in spite of whatever the new powers may fatalize. The fair one with the coquetry of her sex, teases him, but leads him hopefully along by indirection. He starts to go, telling her that he will come for his answer "on the fourth of March", a notoriously busy day in Washington. The girl from the golden land of Mexico, shows her mettle by springing to a large desk calendar and tearing off the leaves till they show the date of March 4. Thus she leaves him in no doubt as to her answer, which is as agreeable to the entire family as the scene demonstrates.

The next morning, the retiring Secretary of War give his trusty clerk chief a formidably sealed document (the secret valuable formula of a high explosive that the government had acquired). Warren is about to put this prize package in his safe for further safety, when the fair Iñez appears. In answer to her curious inquiries, he tells her that the package is one of the great value and would be highly prized by any foreign power - that it would mean big money to them, hence is care in looking after it so closely. Her curiosity is seemingly satisfied. Later in the day, he receives a formal blue envelope of dismissal and realizes that the blow to his fortunes has fallen. He is however, philosophic about it and his house in order. When Iñez hears this news, she is far from pleased and immediately lays in train some plan for continuing and honest man in office and doing away with the chance of allowing a weak and dishonest one to supplant them in the public service. This comes about through her meeting with the new appointee, Lester whom she instinctively doubts. They happen to meet in a Broker's office - and from what she gleams from the Broke, and observes her with her own eyes, as Lester nervously studies the ticker, she sees to plainly his financial desperation due to heavy losses.

Iñez is by nature, a schemer and a diplomat and having made a favorable impression upon the vain and weak Lester, she secures a conference with him at the Broker's office in which she adroitly admits that she is a spy for her country. She further describes a certain sealed document in the War Office with which she is anxious to familiarize herself. She describes the outward appearance of the document with such accuracy that no one could mistake it, and having presented the case, she goes home and drops Lester a note: "If you find that you need money and can secure the document described, bring it to me at the Inaugural Ball".

== Cast ==
- Charles Clary - Warren, chief clerk in the war office
- Harry J. Lonsdale - the Mexican ambassador
- Adrienne Kroell - Iñez, daughter of a Mexican ambassador (written as Inez)
- William Stowell - Lester
- LaFayette McKee - John Marshall
- Rose Evans - wife of the Mexican Ambassador
- Thomas Commerford - James Wiley (billed as T. I. Comberford)

== Musical acts ==
- First part:
  - "Later"
  - "Iñez Believes Lester to be Dishonest" (written as "Inez Believes Lester to be Dishonest")
  - "Baits her Trap"
- Second part:
  - "The New Clerk Chief"
  - "The Inaugural Ball"
  - "Warren Hides her Document"
  - "Morning"
  - "His Job Again Safe"
