= The Pink Opera Cloak =

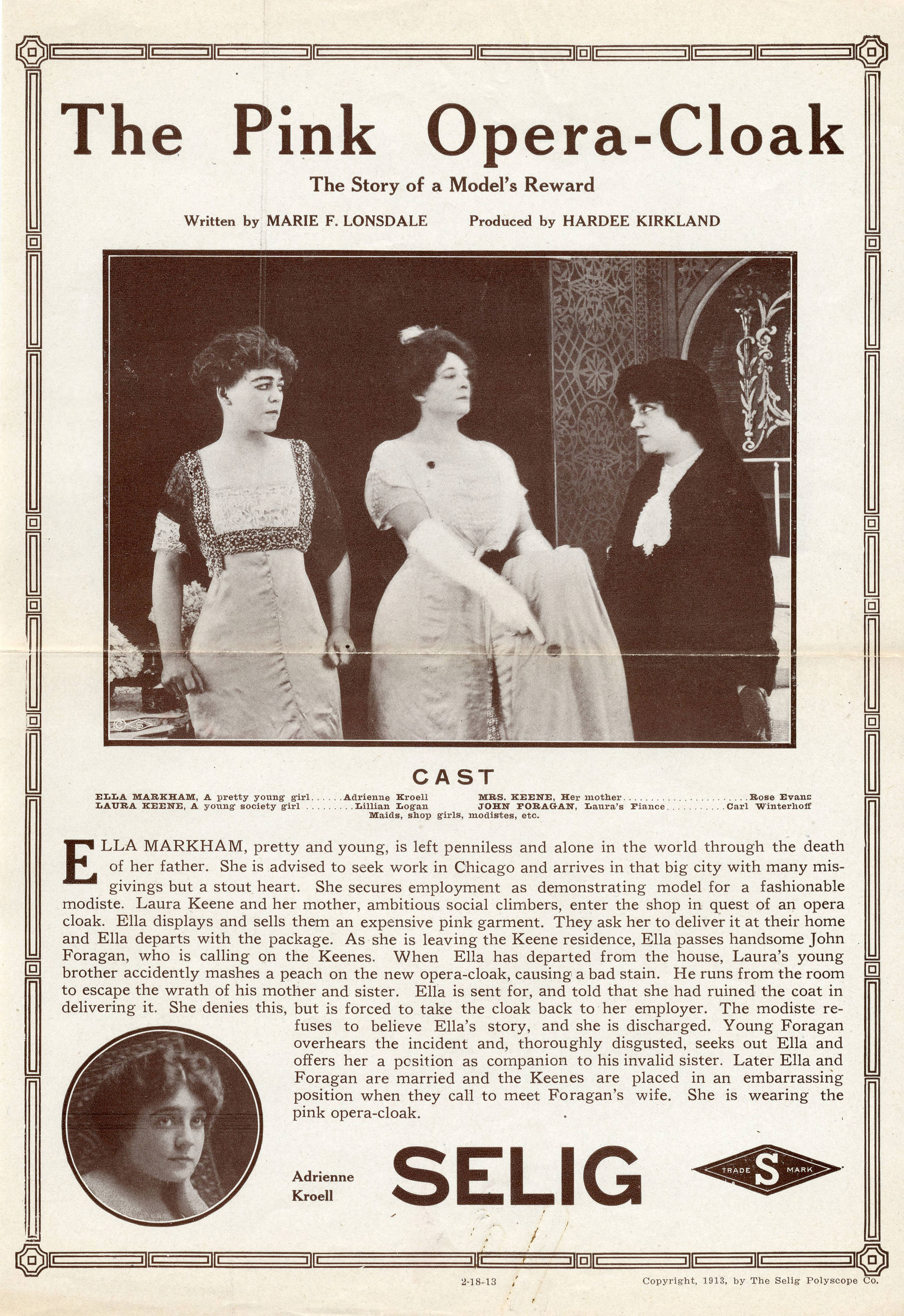
- Release flier featured Adrienne Kroell, Lillian Logan and Rose Evans
- Written by: Marie F. Lonsdale
- Produced by: Hardee Kirkland
- Starring: Adrienne Kroell; Lillian Logan; Rose Evans; Carl Winterhoff
- Distributed by: Selig Polyscope Company
- Release date: February 18, 1912 (U.S.)
- Running time: 1 reel
- Country: United States
- Languages: Silent; English intertitles

The Pink Opera-Cloak, also as The Pink Opera Cloak is a 1913 American silent film drama produced by Hardee Kirkland. The film stars Adrienne Kroell, Lillian Logan, Rose Evans and Carl Winterhoff. The film status is uncertain but a release flier survives which is now at the Margaret Herrick Library at the Academy of Motion Pictures Arts and Sciences, it was part of the Charles G. Clarke collection.

== Plot ==
Ella Markham (Adrienne Kroell) pretty and young is left penniless and along in the world through the death of her father. She is advised to seek work in Chicago and arrives in that big city with many misgivings but a stout heart. She secures employment as demonstrating model for a fashionable modiste. Laura Keene (Lillian Logan) and her mother (Rose Evans), ambitious social climbers, enter the shop in quest of an opera cloak. Ella displays and sells them as expensive pink garment. They ask her to deliver it at their home and Ella leaves with a package. As she is leaving the Keene residence, Ella passes handsome John Foragan (Carl Winterhoff) who is calling on the Keenes. When Ella has left the house, Laura's young brother accidentally mashes a peach on the new opera cloak causing a bad stain. He runs from the room to escape the wrath of his mother and sister. Ella is sent for and told that she had ruined the coat in delivering it. She denies this, but is forced to take the cloak to her employer. The modiste refuses to believe Ella's story and she is discharged. Young Foragan overhears the incident and thoroughly disgusted, seeks out Ella and offers her a position as companion to his invalid sister. Later, Ella and Foragan are married and the Keenes are placed in an embarrassing position when they call to meet Foragan's wife. She is wearing the pink opera cloak.

== Cast ==
- Adrienne Kroell - Ella Markham
- Lillian Logan - Laura Keene
- Rose Evans - Mrs. Keene
- Carl Winterhoff - John Foragan
