= Nobody's Boy =

Nobody's Boy may refer to:

- Sans Famille, a novel of 1878 by Hector Malot
- Nobody's Boy: Remi, an anime of 1977 based on the above novel
- Nobody's Boy (1913 film), a silent film of 1913
- Nobody's Boy (musical) a musical of 1919
