= The Ex-Convict's Plunge =

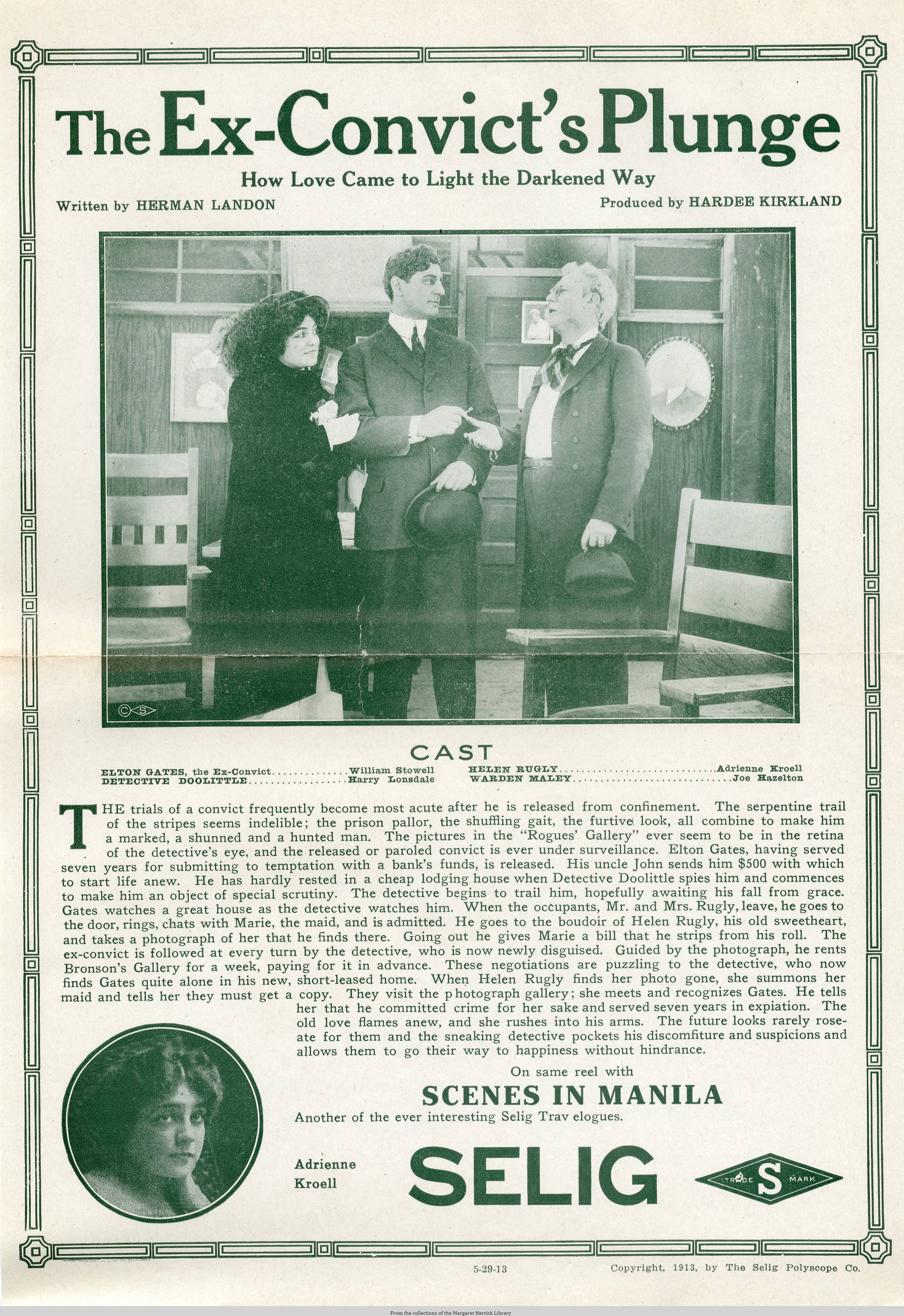
- Release flier featured Adrienne Kroell, William Stowell and Harry J. Lonsdale
- Written by: Herman Landon
- Produced by: Hardee Kirkland
- Starring: William Stowell; Harry J. Lonsdale; Adrienne Kroell
- Distributed by: Selig Polyscope Company
- Release date: May 29, 1913 (U.S.)
- Running time: 1 reel
- Country: United States
- Languages: Silent; English intertitles

The Ex-Convict's Plunge is a 1913 American silent film drama produced by Hardee Kirkland. The film stars William Stowell, Harry J. Lonsdale and Adrienne Kroell.

The film status is uncertain but a release flier survives which is now at the Margaret Herrick Library at the Academy of Motion Pictures Arts and Sciences, it was part of the Charles G. Clarke collection. The short movie was released on April 10, 1913, the reel was around 600 feet (nearly 200 meters) long and was in the same reel with the documentary Scenes in Manila.

== Plot ==
The trials of the convict frequently become most acute after he is released from confinement. The serpentine trail of the stripes seems indelible; the prison pallor, the shuffling gait, the furtive look all combine to make him a marked, a shunned and a hunted man. The Pictures in "Rogue's Gallery" ever seem to be in the retina of the detective's eye and the released or paroled convict is ever under surveillance. Elton Gates, having served seven years for submitting to temptation with the bank's funds is released. His Uncle John sends him $500 with which to start a life anew. He has hardly rested in cheap lodging house when Detective Dolittle spies him and commences to make him an object of a special scrutiny. The detective begins to trail him, hopefully awaiting his fall from grace. Gates watches a great house as the detective watches him. When the occupants, Mr. and Mrs. Rugly, his old sweetheart, and takes a photograph of her that he finds there. Going out he gives Marie a bill that he strips from his roll. The ex-convict is followed at every turn by the detective, who is now newly disguised. Guided by the photograph, he rents Bronson's Gallery for a week, paying for it in advance. These negotiations are puzzling to the detective, who now finds Gates quite alone in his new short leased home. When Helen Rugly finds her photo gone, she summons her maid and tells her they must get a copy. They visit the photograph gallery, she meets and recognizes gates. He tells there that he committed crime for her sake and served seven years in expiation. The old love flames anew, and she rushes him into arms. The future looks rarely roseate for them and the sneaking detective pockets his discomfiture and suspicions and allow them to go their way to happiness without hindrance.

== Cast ==
- William Stowell - Elton Gates, the ex-convict
- Harry J. Lonsdale - Det. Dolittle
- Adrienne Kroell - Helen Rugly
- Joseph Hazleton - Warden Maley (billed as Joe Hazleton)
