= Tommy's Atonement =

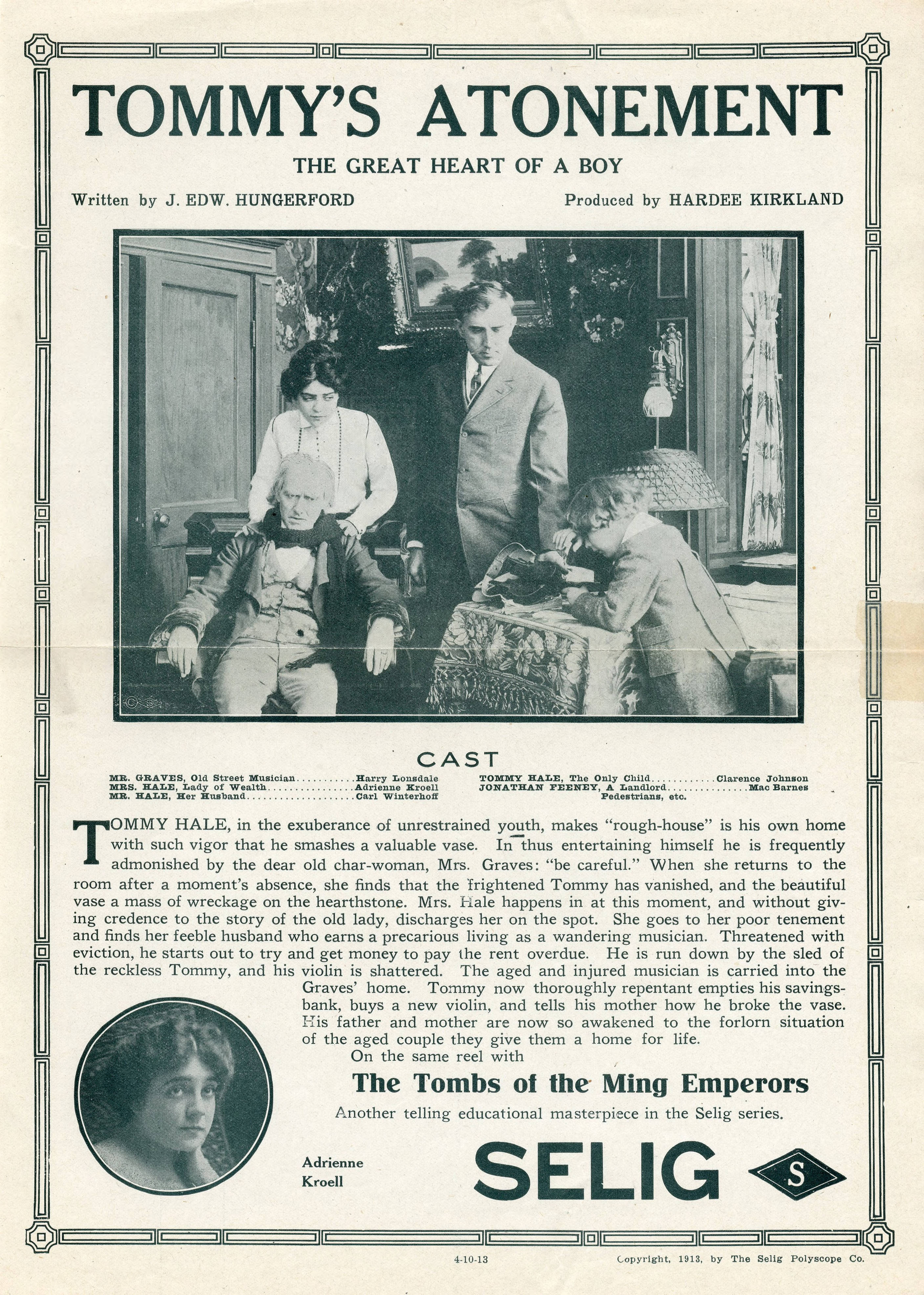
- Release flier, 1913
- Written by: J. Edward Hungerford
- Produced by: Hardee Kirkland
- Starring: Harry J. Lonsdale; Adrienne Kroell; Carl Winterhoff
- Distributed by: Selig Polyscope Company
- Release date: April 10, 1913 (U.S.)
- Running time: 1 reel
- Country: United States
- Languages: Silent; English intertitles

Tommy's Atonement is a 1913 American silent film drama produced by Hardee Kirkland. The film stars Harry J. Lonsdale, Adrienne Kroell and Carl Winterhoff. The film status is uncertain but a release flier survives which is now at the Margaret Herrick Library at the Academy of Motion Pictures Arts and Sciences, it was part of the Charles G. Clarke collection. The short movie was released on April 10, 1913, the reel was around 600 feet (nearly 200 meters) long and was in the same reel with The Tombs of the Ming Emperors which was set in the Ming Dynasty.

== Plot ==
Tommy Hale in the exuberance of unrestrained youth makes "rough-house" is his own home with such vigor that he smashes a valuable vase. In thus entertaining himself he is frequently admonished by the dear old charwoman. Mrs. Graves, be careful. When she returns to the room after a moment's absence, she finds that the frightened Tommy has vanished and the beautiful vase a mass of wreckage of the hearthstone. Mrs. Hale happens in at this moment and without giving credence to the story of the old lady, discharges her on the spot. She goes to her poor tenement and finds her feeble husband who earns him a precarious living as a wandering musician. Threatened with eviction, he starts out and try to get money to pay the rent overdue. He is run down by the sled of the reckless Tommy and his violin is shattered. The aged and injured musician is carried into the Grave's home. Tommy now thoroughly repentant empties his savings bank, buys a new violin and tells his mother how he broke the vase. His father and mother are now so awakened, the forlorn situation of the aged couple they give them a home for life.

== Cast ==
- Harry J. Lonsdale - Mr. Graves
- Adrienne Kroell - Mrs. Hale
- Carl Winterhoff - Mr. Hale
- Clarence Johnson - Tommy Hale
- Mac Barnes - Jonathan Feeney, a landlord, pedestrians, etc.
