= The Voice of Warning =

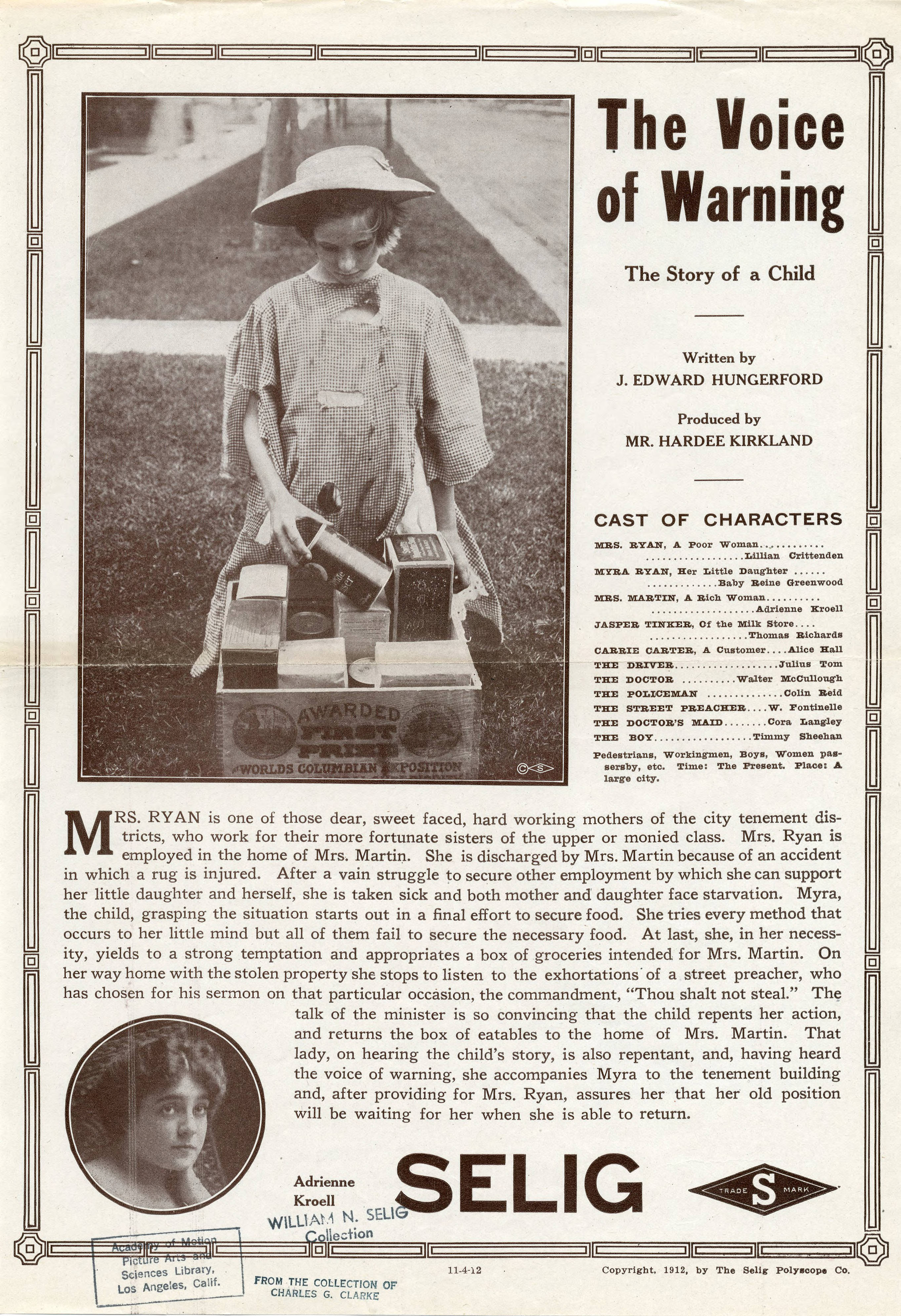
- Release flier to The Voice of Warning Lillian Crittenden is in the top large picture and Adrienne Kroell is in the bottom-left circular picture
- Written by: J. Edward Hungerford
- Produced by: Hardee Kirkland
- Starring: Lillian Crittenden; Reine Greenwood; Adrienne Kroell
- Distributed by: Selig Polyscope Company
- Release date: November 4, 1912 (U.S.)
- Running time: 1 reel
- Country: United States
- Languages: Silent; English intertitles

The Voice of Warning is a 1912 American silent film drama produced by Hardee Kirkland. The film stars Lillian Crittenden, Baby Reine Greenwood and Adrienne Kroell. The film status is uncertain but a release flier survives which is now at the Margaret Herrick Library at the Academy of Motion Pictures Arts and Sciences, it was part of the Charles G. Clarke collection.

== Plot ==
Mrs. Ryan (Adrienne Kroell) is one of those dear, sweet faced, hard working mothers of the city tenement districts, who work for their more fortunate sisters of the upper class. Mrs. Ryan is employed in the home of Mrs. Martin. She is discharged by Mrs. Martin because of the accident in which a rug is injured. After a vain struggle to secure other employment by which she can support her little daughter and herself, she is taken sick and both mother and daughter face starvation. Myra (Reine Greenwood) the child, grasping the situation starts out in a final effort to secure food. She tries every method that occurs to her little mind but all of them fail to secure the necessary food. At last, she in her necessity, yields to a strong temptation and appropriates a box of groceries intended for Mrs. Martin (Adrienne Kroell). On her way home with the stolen property she stops to listen to the exhortations of a street preacher, who has chosen for his sermon on that particular occasion, the commandment "Thou shalt not steal". The talk of the minister is to convincing that the child repents here action and returns the box of food to the home of Mrs. Martin. That lady, on hearing the child' story is also repentant and having heard the voice of warning, she accompanies Myra to the tenement building and after providing for Mrs. Ryan, assures her that her old position will be waiting for her when she is able to return.

== Cast ==
- Lillian Crittenden - Mrs Ryan, a poor woman
- Reine Greenwood, Myra Ryan, her little daughter, billed as Baby Reine Greenwood
- Adrienne Kroell - Mrs. Martin, a rich woman
- Thomas Richards - Jasper Tinkler, of the milk store
- Alice Hall - Carrie Carter, a customer
- Julius Tom, the driver
- Walter McCullough - the doctor
- W. Fontinelle - the street preacher
- Cora Langley - the doctor's maid
- Timmy Sheehan - the boy
