= Adrienne Kroell =

American actress (1892–1949)

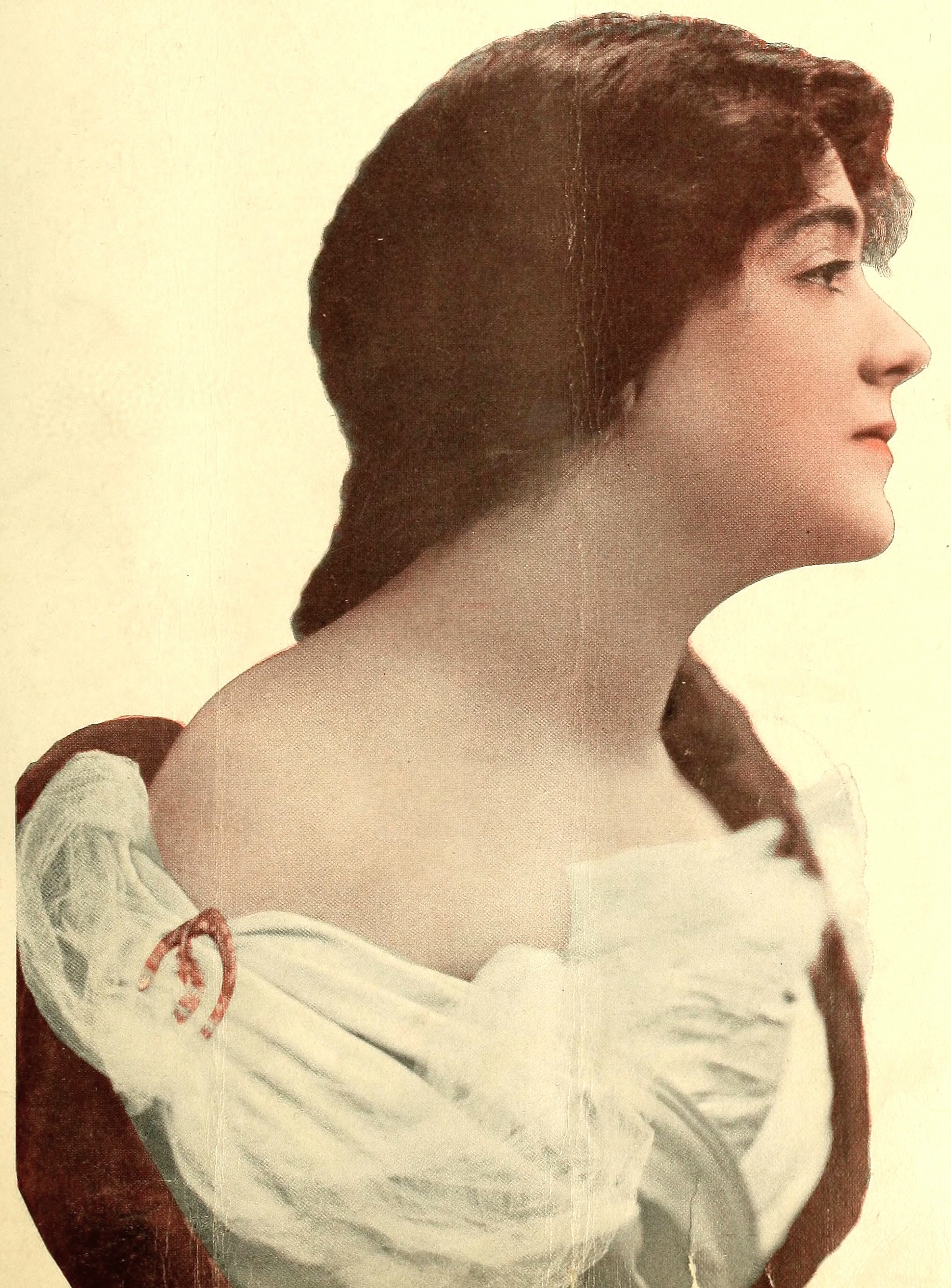
- Kroell featured on the cover of Motography, 1913
- Born: December 13, 1892; Chicago, Illinois
- Died: October 2, 1949 (aged 56); Evanston, Illinois
- Occupations: Actor, film director
- Years active: 1909-14

Adrienne Kroell (December 13, 1892 – October 2, 1949), was an American actress. She appeared in over 75 to 90 films between 1909 and 1914.

She was born in Chicago, Illinois. She later moved to St. Louis, Missouri, and attended Yeatman High School.

Kroell began acting on stage in St. Louis in 1906 after she won a beauty contest there. She first appeared in film in 1909 and appeared in films mostly made by the Selig Polyscope Company until 1914. The Cowboy Millionaire was her first film appearance which also starred Tom Mix. She retired from acting in 1917 after she developed arthritis.

On October 2, 1949, Kroell died at Sturgis Convelescent Home in Evanston, Illinois, of complications from arthritis and was buried at Rosehill Cemetery in Chicago.

== Filmography ==
- The Cowboy Millionaire (1909)
- The Adventuress (1910)
- A Touching Affair (1910)
- The Rummage Sale (1910)
- Her Husband's Deception (1910)
- Girlies (1910)
- His First Long Trousers (1911)
- Montana Anna (1911)
- The Two Orphans (1911)
- The Harem Skirt (1911)
- Maud Muller (1911)
- The Inner Mind (1911)
- A Summer Adventure (1911)
- Brown of Harvard (1911) - Marion Thorne, Gerald's sister
- Paid Back (1911)
- How They Stopped the Run on the Bank (1911)
- Strategy (1911)
- A Counterfeit Santa Claus (1912)
- Cinderella (1912)
- The Adopted Son (1912)
- The Hypnotic Detective (1912)
- An Unexpected Fortune (1912)
- A Citizen in the Making (1912)
- The Horseshoe (1912)
- In Little Italy (1912)
- Murray the Masher (1912)
- According to Law (1912)
- A Mail Order Hypnotist (1912) - May Johnson
- The Law of the North (1912)
- The Miller of Burgundy (1912) - Louise Meunier
- The Laird's Daughter (1912) - Airleen MacGregor
- Subterfuge (1912) - Ethel Gordon
- The Voice of Warning (1912) - Mrs. Martin
- A Man Among Men (1912) - Millie Smith
- The Fire Fighter's Love (1912)
- Prompted by Jealousy (1913) - Laura Venning
- The Clue (1913)
- The Empty Studio (1913)
- The Millionaire Cowboy (1913)
- Don't Let Mother Know (1913) - Irma Baird
- The Pink Opera Cloak (1913) - Ella Markham
- Nobody's Boy (1913) - Bobby
- The Food Chopper War (1913) - Catherine Moore
- A Lucky Mistake (1913)
- A Change of Administration (1913) - Iñez (written as Inez)
- Tommy's Atonement (1913) - Mrs. Hale
- The Ex-Convict's Plunge (1913) - Helen Rugly
- The Adventures Around a Watch (1913)
- Papa's Dream (1913)
- Around Battle Tree (1913)
- Our Neighbors (1913)
- Henrietta's Hair (1913)
- Through Another Man's Eye (1913)
- The Fate of Elizabeth (1913)
- The Golden Cloud (1913)
- The Fifth String (1913)
- The Price of the Free
- A Modern Vendetta (1914)
- A Soldier of the C.S.A. (1914)
- Suppressed News (1914)
- The Bond of Love (1914)
- A Page from Yesterday (1914)
- Her Ladyship (1914)
- In Spite of the Evidence (1914)
- The Pirates of Peacock Alley (1914)
- The Royal Box (1914)
- A Part of Stockings
- The Estrangement (1914)
- The Doctor's Mistake
- The Girl at His Side
- The Lure of the Ladies (1914)
- Love vs. Pride
- Pioneer Days
- Toll of Sin
