= The Cowboy Millionaire =

The Cowboy Millionaire may refer to:

- The Cowboy Millionaire (1909 film), an American silent short Western
- The Cowboy Millionaire (1935 film), an American Western film
