= A Man Among Men =

1912 film

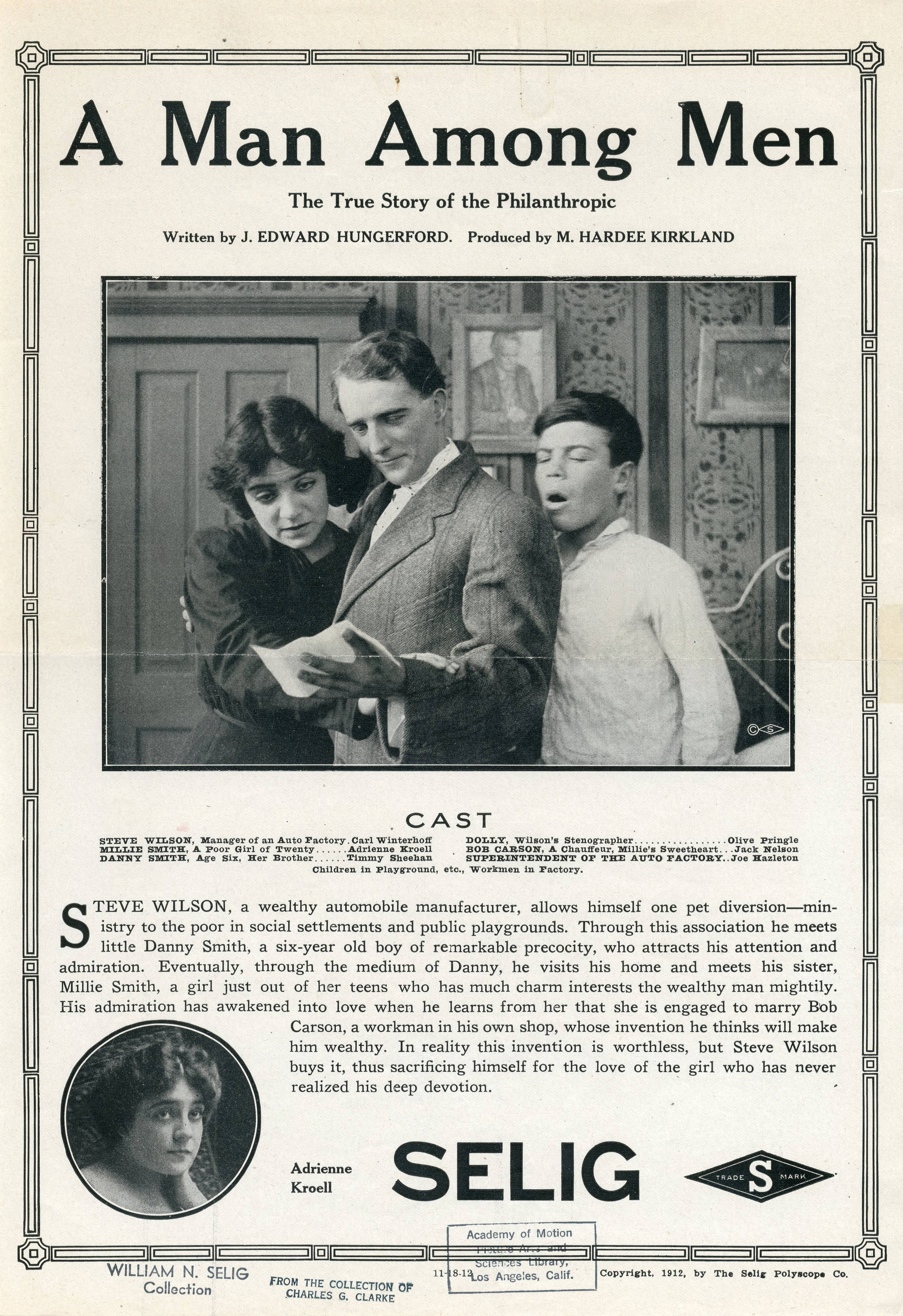
- Release flier to A Man Among Men, cast appearance: Adrienne Kroell, Carl Winterhoff and Timmy Sheehan
- Written by: J. Edward Hungerford
- Produced by: Hardee Kirkland
- Starring: Carl Winterhoff; Adrienne Kroell; Timmy Sheehan
- Distributed by: Selig Polyscope Company
- Release date: November 18, 1912 (U.S.)
- Running time: 1 reel
- Country: United States
- Languages: Silent; English intertitles

A Man Among Men is a 1912 American silent film drama produced by Hardee Kirkland. The film stars Carl Winterhoff Adrienne Kroell. The film status is uncertain, but a release flier survives which is now at the Margaret Herrick Library at the Academy of Motion Pictures Arts and Sciences; it was part of the Charles G. Clarke collection. The film was distributed by the General Film Company and was released on November 18, 1912. The film reel was 3,300 feet (1,000 meters).

== Plot ==
Steve Wilson (Carl Winterhoff), a wealthy automobile manufacturer, allows himself one pet diversion--ministry to the poor in social settlements and public playgrounds. Through this association, he meets little Danny Smith (Timmy Sheehan), a six-year-old boy of remarkable precocity, who attracts his attention and admiration. Eventually, through the medium of Danny, he visits his home and meets his sister, Millie Smith (Adrienne Kroell), a girl just out of her teens who has much charm interests the wealthy man mightily. His administration has awakened into love when he learns from there that she is engaged to marry Bob Carson (Jack Nelson), a workman in his own shop, whose invention he thinks will make him wealthy. In reality, this invention is worthless, but Steve Wilson buys it, thus sacrificing himself for the love of the girl who has never realized his deep devotion.

== Cast ==
- Carl Winterhoff - Steve Wilson, manager of an auto factory
- Adrienne Kroell - Millie Smith - a twenty year old poor girl
- Timmy Sheehan - Danny Smith, age six, her brother
- Olive Pringle - Dolly, Wilson's stenographer
- Jack Nelson - Bob Carson, a chauffeur, Millie's sweetheart
- Joseph Hazleton - auto factory superintendent, billed as Joe Hazleton
