= Harry Lonsdale (actor) =

British born actor stage and silent film actor

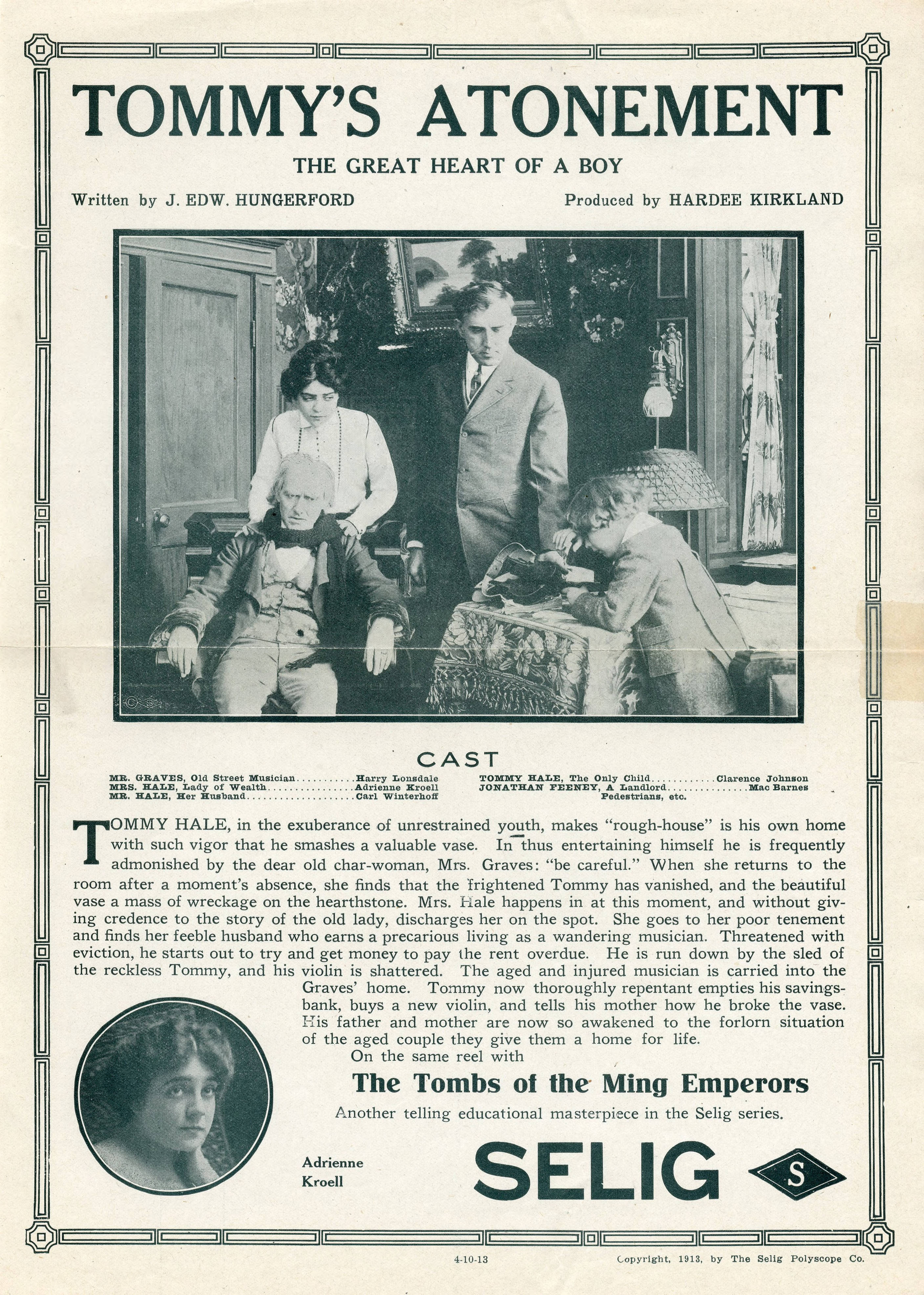
Flier for Tommy's Atonement

Harry J. Lonsdale (born Henry Gittus Lonsdale; 6 December 1862 – 8 February 1939) was a British born actor stage and silent film actor. He played leading parts. and married stage actress Alice Lonnon and then divorced.

Lonsdale was born in Worcester, and died in Derby. The National Portrait Gallery has a photograph of him in costume as the Marquis de Corneville in Les Cloches de Corneville from 1890.

He married American actress Alice Lonnon on 20 March 1899. They divorced in 1906.

Lonsdale had roles in several Colin Campbell directed films for Selig.

He died at St. Vincent's Hospital in Los Angeles on 8 February 1939 at 76.

== Selected filmography ==
- A Counterfeit Santa Claus (1912)
- Tommy's Atonement (1913)
- The Ex-Convict's Plunge (1913)
- A Change of Administration (1913)
- The Rosary (1915)
- Sweet Alyssum (1915)
- The Ne'er-Do-Well (1916)
- The Garden of Allah (1916)
- His Brothers Keeper (1916)
- Who Shall Take My Life? (1917)
- Beware of Strangers (1917)
- Little Orphant Annie (1918)
- The City of Purple Dreams
- The Illustrious Prince (1919)
- The Shepherd of the Hills (1919)
- The Week-End (1920)
- Where Men Are Men (1921)
- The Fighting Guide (1922)
- The Call of Home (1922)
- The Great Night (1922)
- Thelma (1922)
- Big Dan (1923)
- The Vagabond Trail (1924)
- The Last of the Duanes (1924)
- Brand of Cowardice (1925)
- Her Husband's Secret (1925)
