= Prompted by Jealousy =

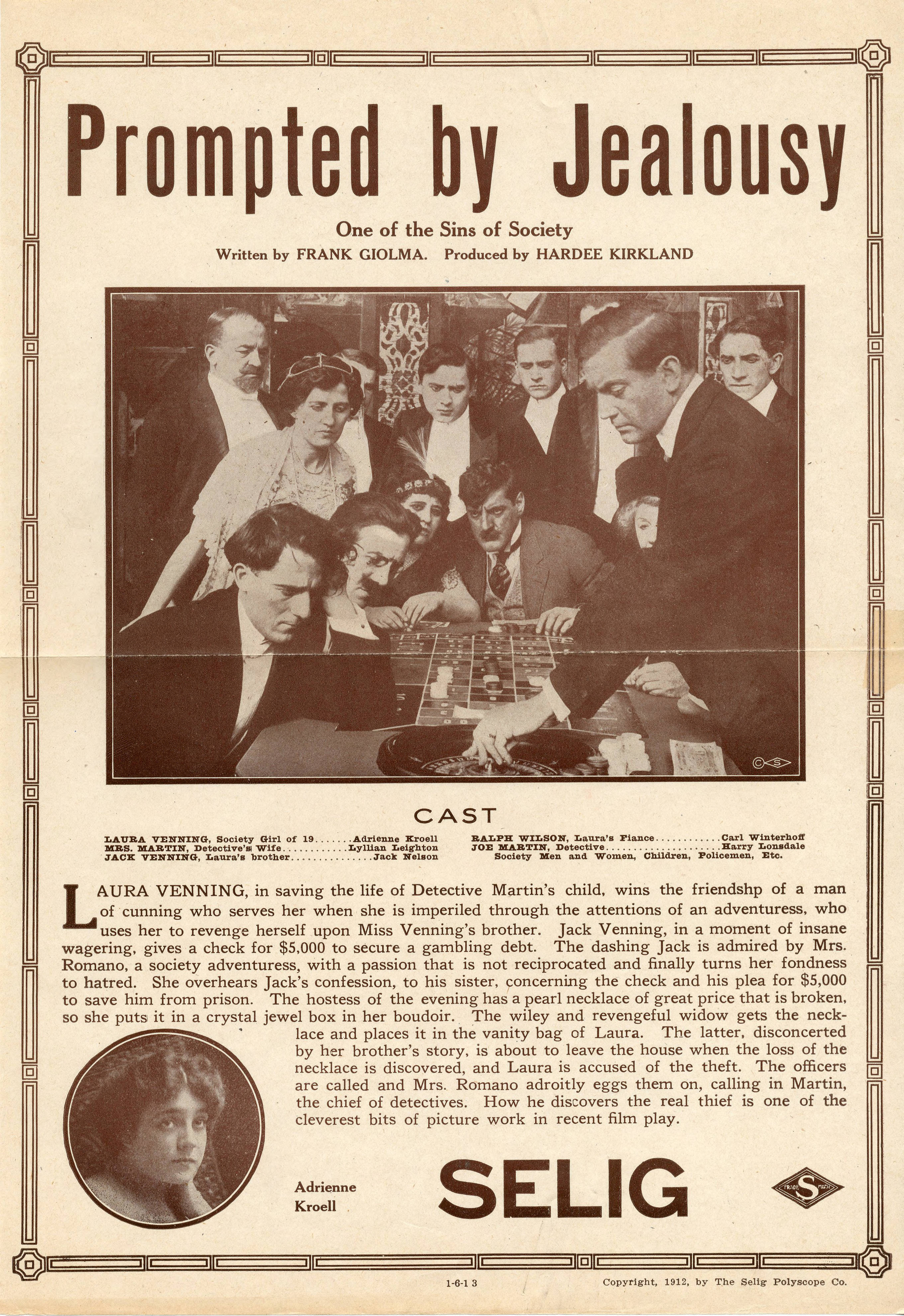
- Release flier to Prompted by Jealousy all the listed cast is featured
- Written by: Frank Giolma
- Produced by: Hardee Kirkland
- Starring: Lillian Crittenden; Reine Greenwood; Adrienne Kroell
- Distributed by: Selig Polyscope Company
- Release date: January 6, 1912 (U.S.)
- Running time: 1 reel
- Country: United States
- Languages: Silent; English intertitles

Prompted by Jealousy is a 1913 American silent film drama produced by Hardee Kirkland. The film stars Adrienne Kroell, Lillian Leighton (billed as Lyllian Leighton) and Jack Nelson. The film status is uncertain but a release flier survives which is now at the Margaret Herrick Library at the Academy of Motion Pictures Arts and Sciences, it was part of the Charles G. Clarke collection. The reel was 1,100 feet (340 meters) long.

== Plot ==
Laura Venning (Adrienne Kroell), in saving the life of Detective Martin's child wins the friendship of a man of cunning who serves her when she is imperiled through the attentions of an adventuress, who uses here to revenge herself upon Miss Venning's brother. Jack Venning, in a moment of insane wagering, gives a check of $5,000 (approximately 100,000-150,000 as of 2015) to secure a gambling debt. The dashing Jack is admired by Mrs. Romano, a society adventuress with a passion that is not reciprocated and finally turns her fondness to hatred. She overhear's Jack's confession, to his sister, concerning the check and his plea for $5,000 to save him from prison. The hostess of the evening has a pearl necklace of great price that is broken, so she puts it in a crystal jewel box in her boudoir. The wiley and revengeful widow gets the necklace and places it in the vanity bag of Laura. The latter, disconcerted by her brother's story, is about to leave the house when the loss of the necklace is discovered, and Laura is accused of the theft. The officers are called and Mrs. Romano adroitly eggs them on, calling in Martin, the chief of detectives. How he discovers the real thief is one of the cleverest bits of picture work of a play of the time.

== Cast ==
- Adrienne Kroell - Laura Venning, society girl of 19
- Lillian Leighton - Mrs. Martin, Detective's wife (billed as Lyllian Martin)
- Jack Nelson - Jack Venning
- Carl Winterhoff - Ralph Wilson, Laura's fiancé
- Harry Lonsdale - Joe Martin, detective
