= Swords and Hearts =

1911 film directed by D. W. Griffith

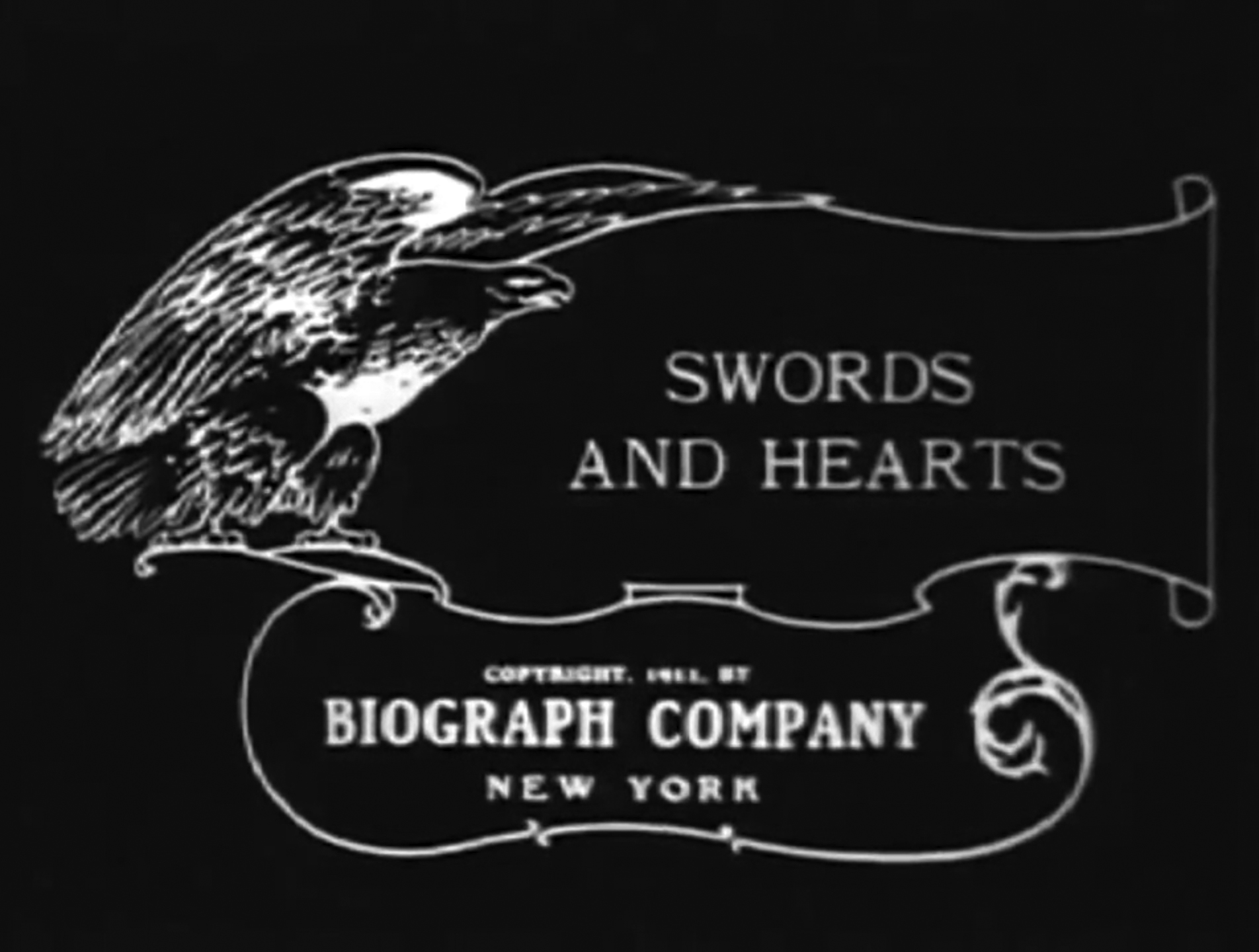
- Title card
- Directed by: D. W. Griffith
- Written by: Emmett C. Hall
- Starring: See below
- Cinematography: G. W. Bitzer
- Distributed by: Biograph Company
- Release date: August 28, 1911
- Running time: 16 minutes
- Country: United States
- Language: Silent (English intertitles)

Full movie

Swords and Hearts is a 1911 American silent drama film directed by D. W. Griffith and released by the Biograph Company.

== Plot summary ==
Hugh Frazier, a Confederate officer during the American Civil War, is trailed by Union soldiers while stopping to visit his sweetheart Irene Lambert. Jenny Baker, a poor young woman who is a not-so-secret admirer of the officer, puts on his overcoat and takes his horse and rides away, causing the Union soldiers to follow. After the war, Jenny and Hugh are reunited.

== Cast ==
- Wilfred Lucas as Hugh Frazier
- Claire McDowell as Irene Lambert
- Dorothy West as Jenny Baker
- William J. Butler as Old Ben
- Charles West as The Suitor
- Verner Clarges as Hugh's Father
- Francis J. Grandon as Jennie's Father
- Alfred Paget as Bushwacker
- Donald Crisp as Bushwacker
- Kate Bruce as At Lambert House (uncredited)
- Donald Crisp as At Frazier House / Bushwacker (uncredited)
- Frank Evans as Bushwhacker (uncredited)
- Guy Hedlund as At Frazier House / Union Soldier (uncredited)
- Florence La Badie as Undetermined Role (uncredited)
- J. Jiquel Lanoe as Union Soldier / Bushwhacker (uncredited)
- Charles Hill Mailes as Bushwhacker (uncredited)
- W. Chrystie Miller as Minor Role (uncredited)

== Commentary ==
Jenny Baker is fearless after she dons the officer's overcoat and takes his horse to divert the Union soldiers. Her horsemanship is emphasized over the other male riders, as soon as she is on the horse she rides at full speed and she alone among the riders has her horse rear up on its hind legs.

== Preservation ==
Copies of Swords and Hearts are held by the Museum of Modern Art and BFI National Archive.
