= Don't Let Mother Know =

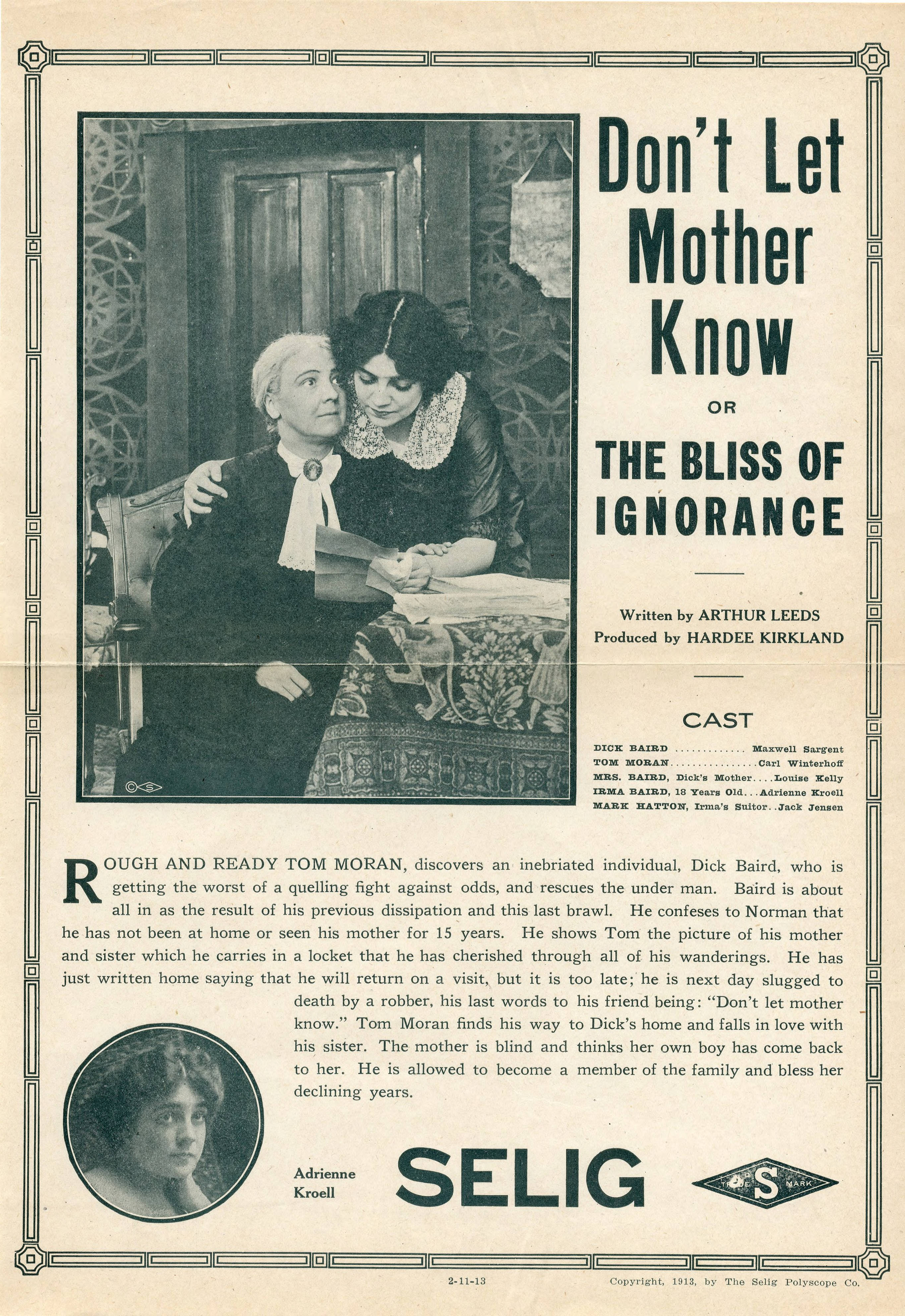
- Release flier
- Written by: Arthur Leeds
- Produced by: Hardee Kirkland
- Starring: Maxwell Sargent; Carl Winterhoff
- Distributed by: Selig Polyscope Company
- Release date: October 18, 1912 (U.S.)
- Running time: 1 reel
- Country: United States
- Languages: Silent; English intertitles

Don't Let Mother Know, also The Bliss of Ignorance is a 1913 American silent film drama produced by Hardee Kirkland. The film stars Maxwell Sargent, Carl Winterhoff, Louise Kelly, Adrienne Kroell and Jack Jonson. The film status is uncertain but a release flier survives which is now at the Margaret Herrick Library at the Academy of Motion Pictures Arts and Sciences.

== Plot ==
Rough and Ready Tom Moran discovers an inebriated individual, Dick Baird who is getting the worst of a quelling fight against odds and rescues the under man. Baird is about all in as the result of his previous dissipation and this last brawl. He confesses to Norman that he has not been at home or seen his mother for fifteen years. He shows Tom the picture of his mother and sister which he carries in a locket that he has cherished through all of his wanderings. He has just written home saying that he will return on a visit, but it is too late; he is next day slugged to death by a robber, his last words to his friend being: "Don't let mother know". Tom Moran finds his way to Dick's home and falls in love with his sister. The mother is blind and thinks her own boy has come back to her. He is allowed to become a member of the family and bless her declining years.

== Cast ==
- Maxwell Sargent - Dick Baird
- Carl Winterhoff - Tom Moran
- Louise Kelly - Mrs. Baird (as Louise Kelley)
- Adrienne Kroell - Irma Baird, 15 Years Old
- Jack Jonson - Mark Hatton, Irma's Suitor
