= A Mail Order Hypnotist =

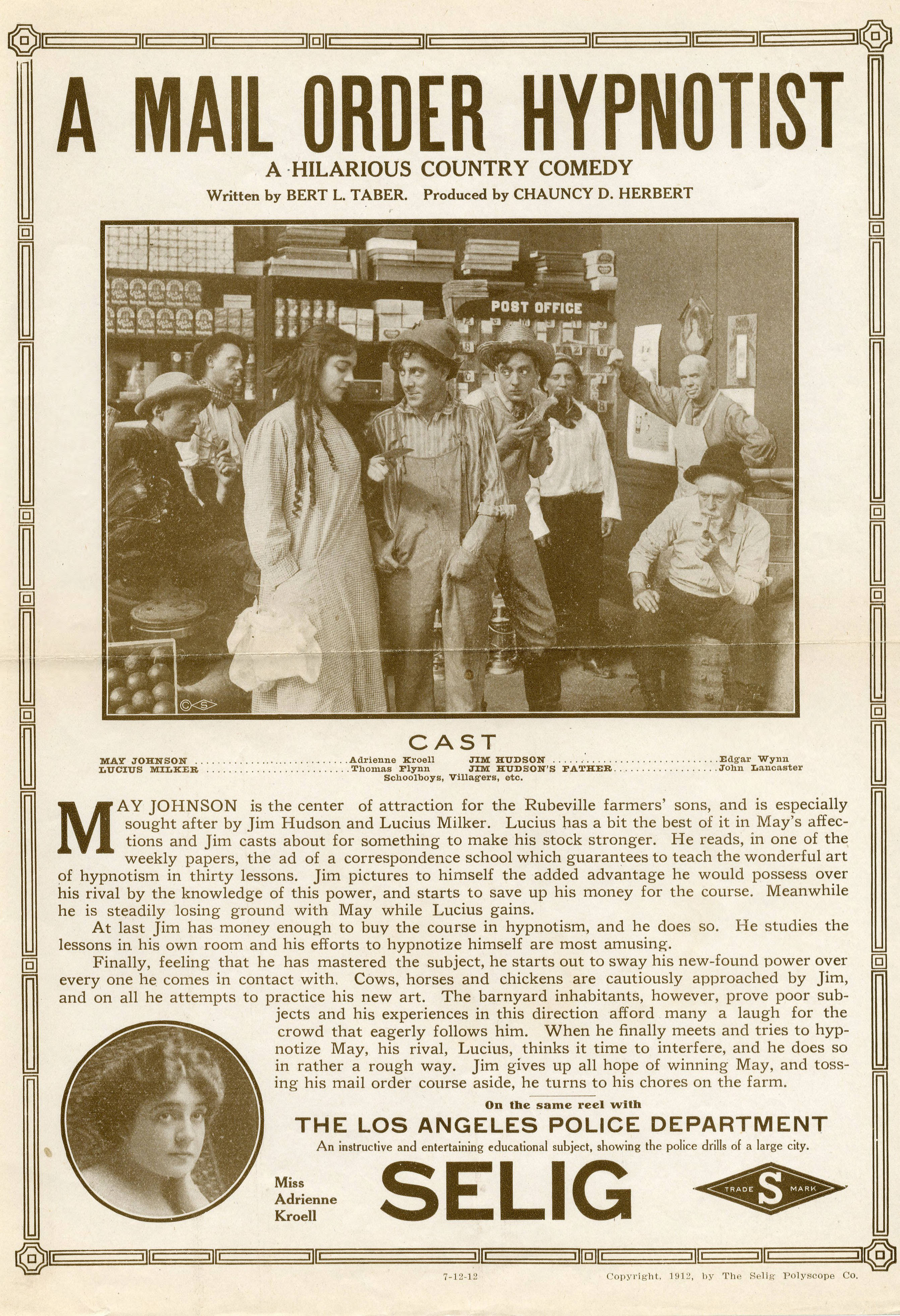
- Release flier to A Mail Order Hypnotist. Cast in order or appearance included Adrienne Kroell as May Johnson, Thomas Flynn as Lucius Milker, Edgary Wynn as Jim Hudson and John Lancaster as Jim Hudson's father.
- Written by: Bert L. Taber
- Produced by: Chauncey D. Herbert
- Starring: Adrienne Kroell; Thomas Flynn
- Distributed by: Selig Polyscope Company
- Release date: July 12, 1912 (U.S.)
- Running time: 1 reel
- Country: United States
- Languages: Silent; English intertitles

A Mail Order Hypnotist is a 1912 American silent film drama produced by Chauncey D. Herbert. The film stars Adrienne Kroell and Thomas Flynn. The film was distributed by the General Film Company and released together with The Los Angeles Police Department or The LAPD. The film status is uncertain but a release flier survives which is now at the Margaret Herrick Library at the Academy of Motion Pictures Arts and Sciences. The split reel measured around 800 feet (225 m).

== Plot ==
May Johnson is the center of attraction for Rubeville farmer's sons and is especially sought after by Jim Hudson and Lucius Milker. Lucius has a bit the best of it in May's affections and Jim casts about for something to make his stock stronger. He reads, in one of the weekly papers, the ad of a correspondence school which guarantees to teach the wonderful art of hypnotism in thirty lessons. Jims pictures to himself the added advantage he would possess over his rival by the knowledge of this power, and starts of save up his money for the course. Meanwhile, he is steadily losing ground with May while Lucius gains.

At last Jim has money enough to buy the course in hypnotism, and he does so. He studies the lessons in his own room and his efforts to hypnotize himself are most amusing.

Finally, feeling that he has mastered the subject, he starts out to sway his new-found power over every one he comes in contact with. Cows, horses and chickens are cautiously approached by Jim, and on all he attempts to practice his new art. The barnyard inhabitants, however, prove poor subjects and his experiences in this direction afford many a laugh for the crowd that eagerly follows him. When he finally meets and tries to hypnotize May, his rival, Lucius, thinks it time to interfere, and he does so in rather a rough way. Jim gives up all hope of winning May and tossing his mail order course aside, he turns to his chores on the farm.

== Cast ==
- Adrienne Kroell - May Johnson
- Thomas Flynn - Lucius Miller
- Edgar G. Wynn - Jim Hudson
- John Lancaster - Jim Hudson's father

Schoolboys, villagers and some others were included in the cast
