= Carl Winterhoff =

American actor

Carl Winterhoff was an American actor. He appeared in 18 films between 1909 and 1913.

== Selected filmography ==
- The Cowboy Millionaire (1909)
- A Man Among Men (1912) - Steve Wilson
- Prompted by Jealousy (1913) - Ralph Wilson
- Don't Let Mother Know (1913) - Tom Moran
- The Pink Opera Cloak (1913) - John Foragan
- Tommy's Atonement (1913) - Mr. Hale
