= Youth to Youth =

1922 film

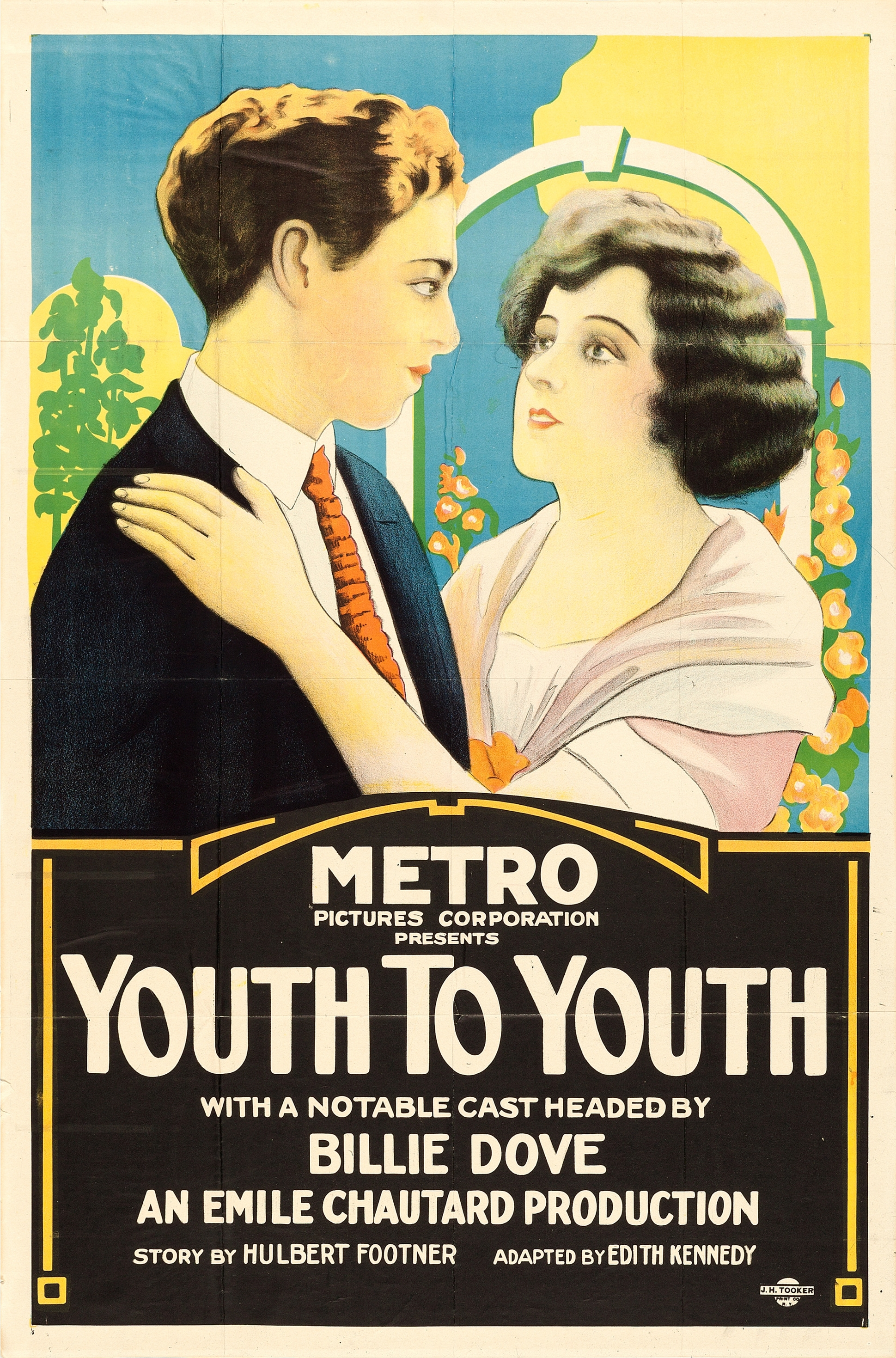
- Theatrical release poster
- Directed by: Emile Chautard
- Written by: Edith Kennedy
- Story by: Hulbert Footner
- Produced by: Emile Chautard
- Starring: Billie Dove; Edythe Chapman; Hardee Kirkland
- Cinematography: Arthur Martinelli
- Production company: Metro Pictures
- Distributed by: Metro Pictures
- Release date: October 16, 1922 (US)
- Running time: 6 reels
- Country: United States
- Language: English

Youth to Youth is a 1922 American silent melodrama film directed by Emile Chautard and starring Billie Dove, Edythe Chapman, and Hardee Kirkland. It was released on October 16, 1922.

== Cast ==
- Billie Dove as Eve Allinson
- Edythe Chapman as Mrs. Cora Knittson
- Hardee Kirkland as Taylor
- Sylvia Ashton as Mrs. Jolley
- Jack Gardner as Maurice Gibbon
- Cullen Landis as Page Brookins
- Mabel Van Buren as Mrs. Brookins
- Tom O'Brien as Ralph Horry
- Paul Jeffrey as Everett Clough
- Carl Gerard as Howe Snedecor

== Preservation ==
The film is now considered lost.

== Gallery ==
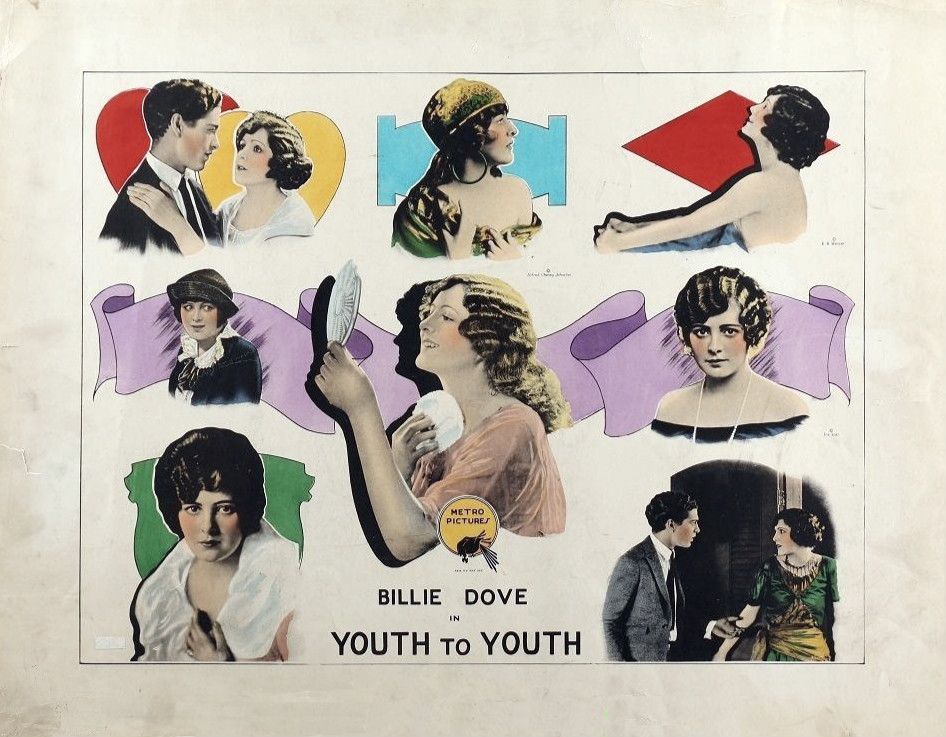
Lobby card
