= Without Compromise =

1922 film

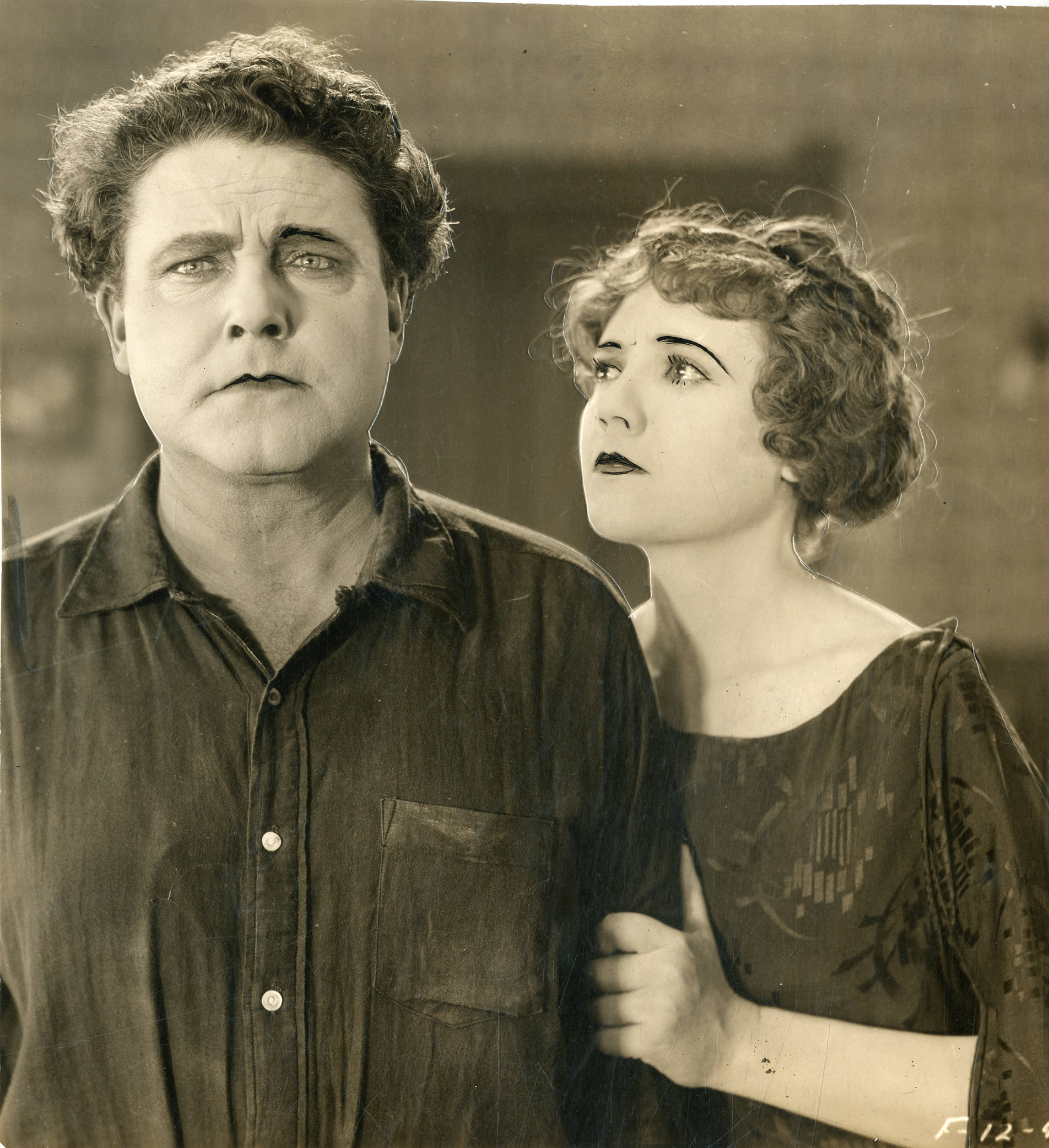
- Film still with William Farnum and Lois Wilson
- Directed by: Emmett J. Flynn
- Screenplay by: Bernard McConville
- Based on: Without Compromise; 1922 novel by: Lillian Bennett-Thompson; George Hubbard
- Produced by: William Fox
- Starring: William Farnum; Lois Wilson; Robert McKim; Tully Marshall; Hardee Kirkland; Otis Harlan
- Cinematography: Devereaux Jennings
- Production company: Fox Film Corporation
- Distributed by: Fox Film Corporation
- Release date: October 29, 1922
- Running time: 60 minutes
- Country: United States
- Languages: Silent; English intertitles

Without Compromise is a 1922 American silent Western film directed by Emmett J. Flynn and written by Bernard McConville. It is based on the 1922 novel Without Compromise by Lillian Bennett-Thompson and George Hubbard. The film stars William Farnum, Lois Wilson, Robert McKim, Tully Marshall, Hardee Kirkland, and Otis Harlan. The film was released on October 29, 1922, by Fox Film Corporation.

== Cast ==
- William Farnum as Dick Leighton
- Lois Wilson as Jean Ainsworth
- Robert McKim as David Ainsworth
- Tully Marshall as Samuel McAllister
- Hardee Kirkland as Judge Gordon Randolph
- Otis Harlan as Dr. Evans
- Will Walling as Bill Murray
- Alma Bennett as Nora Foster
- Eugene Pallette as Tommy Ainsworth
- Fred Kohler as Cass Blake
- John Francis Dillon as Jackson
