= Brand of Cowardice =

1925 film

- Directed by: John P. McCarthy
- Written by: John P. McCarthy; Roger Pocock
- Produced by: Phil Goldstone
- Starring: Bruce Gordon; Carmelita Geraghty; Harry Lonsdale
- Cinematography: Victor Milner
- Edited by: Fred Allen
- Production company: Phil Goldstone Productions
- Distributed by: Truart Film Corporation
- Release date: June 30, 1925
- Running time: 62 minutes
- Country: United States
- Languages: Silent; English intertitles

Brand of Cowardice is a 1925 American silent Western film directed by John P. McCarthy and starring Bruce Gordon, Carmelita Geraghty and Harry Lonsdale.

== Cast ==
- Bruce Gordon as Michael Cochrane aka Smith
- Carmelita Geraghty as Don Alvarado's Daughter
- Harry Lonsdale as Don Luis Alvarado
- Cuyler Supplee
- Ligia de Golconda
- Charles McHugh as Ranch Hand
- Mark Fenton
- Sidney De Gray

== Preservation ==
With no holdings located in archives, Brand of Cowardice is considered a lost film.
