= The Miller of Burgundy =

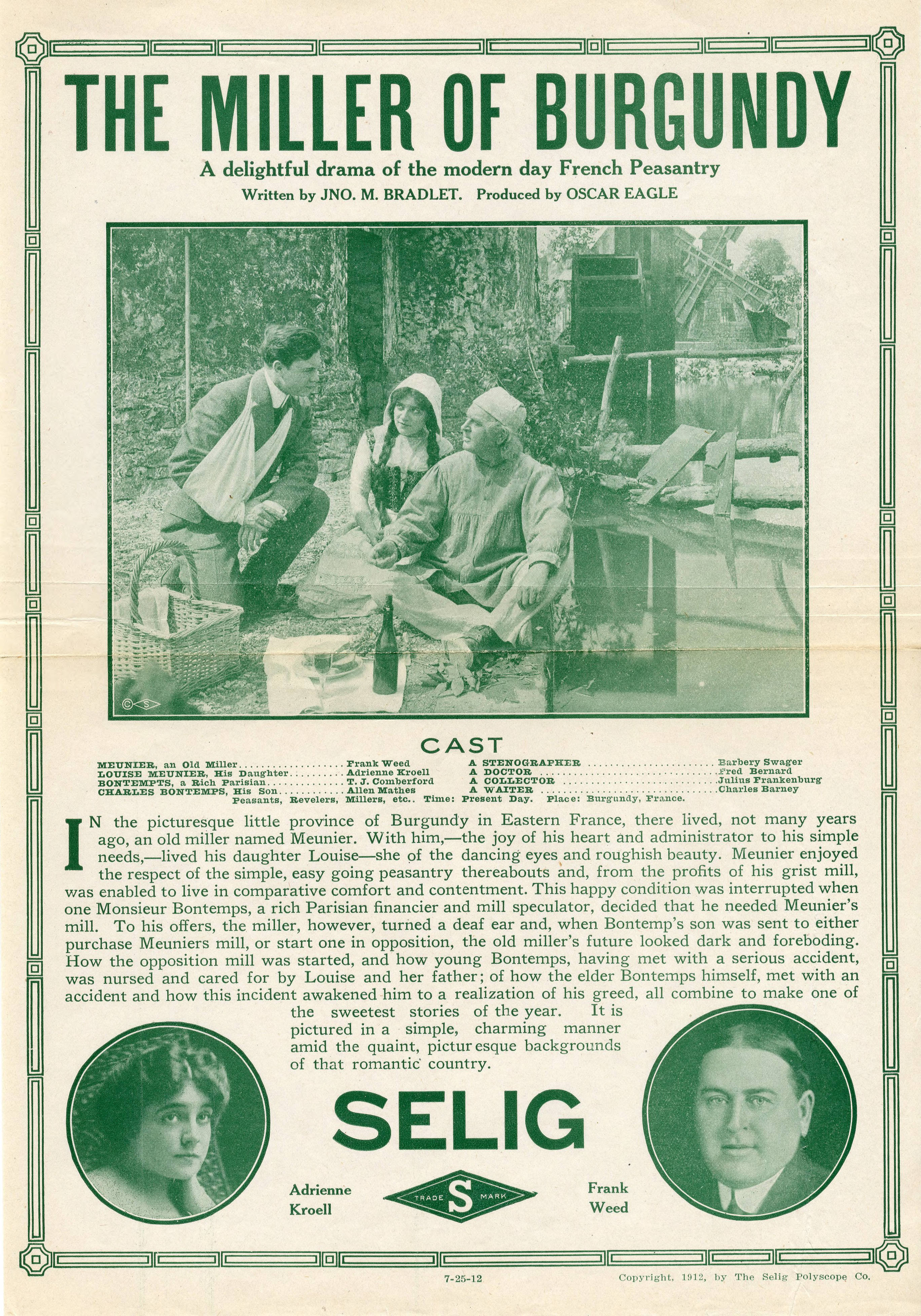
- Release flier
- Written by: John M. Bradley
- Produced by: Oscar Eagle
- Starring: Frank Weed; Adrienne Kroell
- Distributed by: Selig Polyscope Company
- Release date: July 25, 1912 (U.S.)
- Country: United States
- Languages: Silent; English intertitles

The Miller of Burgundy (sometimes spelled Burgandy) is a 1912 American silent film drama produced by Oscar Eagle. The film stars Frank Weed and Adrienne Kroell.

== Plot ==
In the picturesque little province of Burgundy in Eastern France, there lived an old miller named Meunier. With him, the joy of his heart and administrator to his simple needs, lived his daughter Louise, she of the dancing eyes and roughish beauty. Meunier enjoyed the respect of the simple easy going peasantry thereabouts and, from profits of his grist mill, he was enabled to live in a comparative comfort and contentment. This happy condition was interrupted when one Monsieur Bontemps, a rich Parisian financier and mill speculator, decided that he need Meunier's mill. To his offers, the miller however, turned a deaf ear and when Bontemp's son was sent to either purchase Meunier's mill, or start one in opposition, the old miller's future looked dark and foreboding. How the opposition mill was started, and how young Bontemps, having met with a serious accident, was nursed and cared for by Louise and her father; of how the Elder Bontemps himself, met with an accident and how this incident awakened him to a realization of his greed, all combine to make one of the sweetest stories of that year. It is pictured in a simple, charming manner amid the quaint, picturesque backgrounds of that romantic country.

== Cast ==
- Frank Weed - an old miller
- Adrienne Kroell - Louise Meunier
- Thomas Commerford - Bontemps (Bontempts), billed as T. J. Comberford
- Allen Mathes - Charles Bomtenps
- Barbery Swager - a stenographer
- Fred Bernard - a doctor
- Julius Frankenburg - a collector
- Charles Barney - a waiter
