= Emmett C. Hall =

American actor

Emmett Campbell Hall
- Born: November 18, 1882; Talbotton, Georgia
- Died: March 1956 (age 73); Palm Beach, Florida
- Occupation: screenwriter
- Years active: 1910s

Emmett C. Hall, born Emmett Campbell Hall (November 18, 1882 - March 1956) was an American screenwriter and silent film actor. He directed around 70 silent films and acted in one silent film.

He was born in Talbotton, Georgia. He wrote several films with Edwin S. Porter and D. W. Griffith, the two most famous directors of American film at the time. He died in Palm Beach in 1955.

== Filmography ==
=== As screenwriter ===
- Red Eagle's Love Affair (1910)
- The House with Closed Shutters (1910)
- The Road to Richmond (1910), a Selig Civil War drama and love story
- Almost a Hero (1910)
- Rose O'Salem Town (1910)
- That Chink at Golden Gulch (1910), alternate title: That Chinese at Golden Gulch
- A Mountain Maid (1910)
- His Trust: The Faithful Devotion and Self-Sacrifice of an Old Negro Servant (1911)
- His Trust Fulfulled (1911)
- Was He a Coward? (1911)
- Teaching Dada to Like Her (1911)
- A Little Lad in Dixie (1911)
- The Primal Call (1911)
- Swords and Hearts (1911)
- For His Son (1912)
- At the Point of the Sword (1912)
- The End of the Romance (1912)
- The Return of John Gray
- Under a Flag of Truce (1912)
- A Reconstructed Rebel (1912)
- The Bugler of Battery B (1912)
- The Soldier Brothers of Susanna (1912)
- The Laird's Daughter (1912)
- For the Love of a Girl (1912)
- Shanghaied (1912)
- The Mexican Spy (1913)
- Down the Rio Grande (1913)
- The Grim Toll of War (1913)
- The Battle of Bloody Ford (1913)
- The Gift of the Storm (1913)
- The Burden Bearer (1913)
- With Love's Eyes (1913)
- The Fighting Chaplain (1913)
- The Veil of Sleep (1913)
- Indian Summer (1913)
- The Price Demanded (around 1913)
- The Hills of Strife (around 1913)
- The Taking of Rattlesnake Bill (around 1913)
- The Rattlesnake (around 1913)
- The Smuggler's Daughter (1913)
- The Battle of Shiloh (1913)
- Through Flaming Paths (around 1913)
- Before the Last Leaves Fall (1913)
- Smiles of Fortune (1913)
- The Blinded Heart (1914)
- The Pale of Prejudice (1914)
- The Catch of the Season (1914)
- The House of Fear (1914)
- The Puritan (1914)
- In the Northland (1914)
- A Practical Demonstration (1914)
- The Shadow of Tragedy (around 1914)
- Who Seeks Revenge (around 1914)
- A Matter of Record (around 1914)
- The Beloved Adventurer (around 1914)
- The Impostor (1914)
- Stonewall Jackson's Way (around 1914)
- The Unknown Country (1914)
- A Recent Confederate Victory
- The Friendship of Lamond
- The Language of the Dumb
- On the Road to Reno
- Such Things Really Happen
- On Bitter Creek
- Nobody Would Believe (1915)
- A Day of Havoc (1915)
- Where the Road Divided
- Human Driftwood
- The Crimson Yoke
- Beyond the Wall (1916)
- The Smoldering Spark (1917)
- Polly of the Circus (1917)
- To the Highest Bidder (1917)

=== As an actor ===
- Such Things Really Happen
