= The Laird's Daughter =

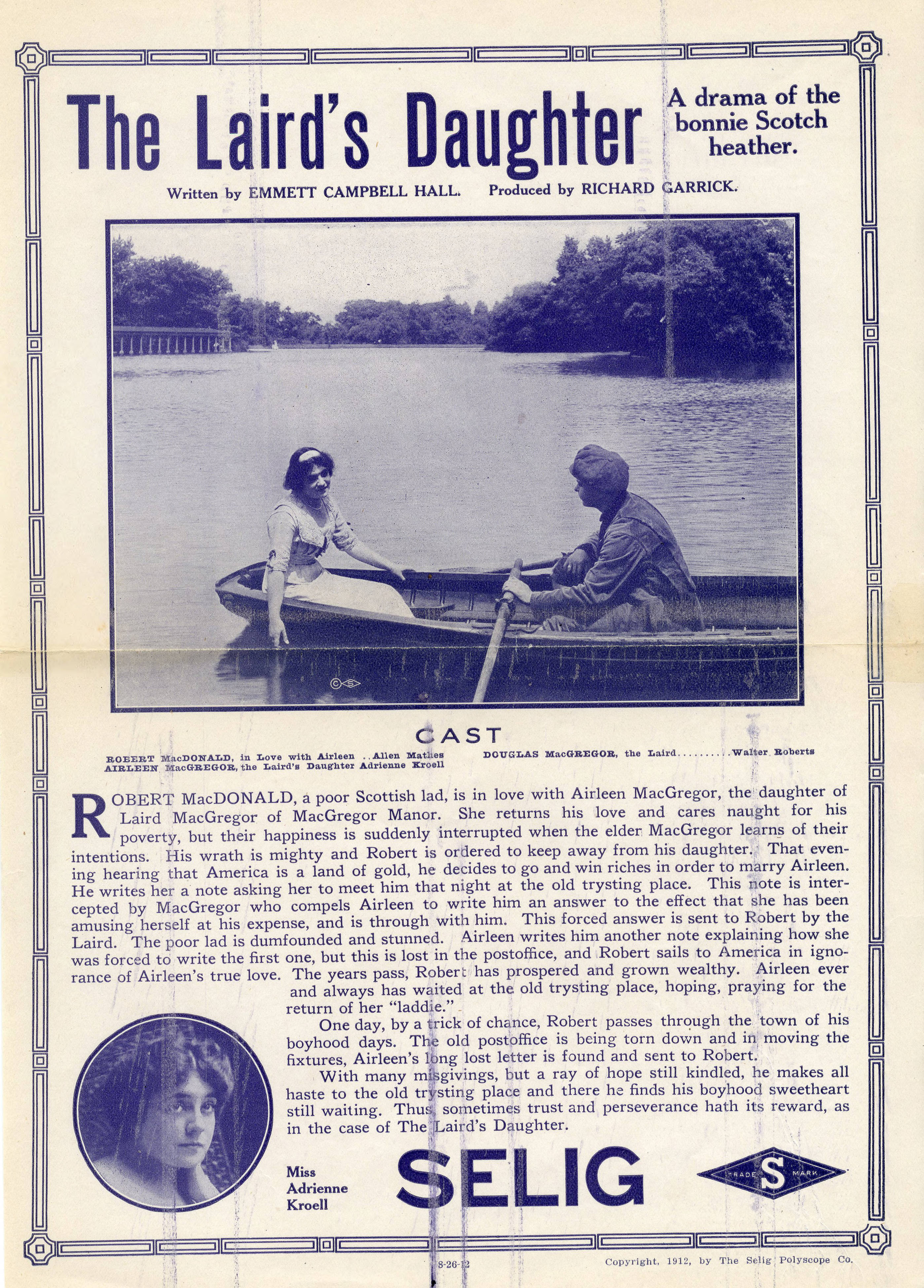
- Release flier to The Laird's Daughter Cast included Adrienne Kroell as Airleen Macgregor and Walter Roberts as Douglas MacGregor
- Written by: Emmett Campbell Hall
- Produced by: Richard Garrick
- Starring: Adrienne Kroell; Allen Mathes; Walter Roberts
- Distributed by: Selig Polyscope Company
- Release date: August 26, 1912 (U.S.)
- Country: United States
- Languages: Silent; English intertitles

The Laird's Daughter is a 1912 American silent film drama produced by Oscar Eagle. The film stars Allen Mathes, Adrienne Kroell and Walter Roberts. The film status is uncertain but a release flier survives. It was written by Emmett Campbell Hall.

== Plot ==
Robert MacDonald, a poor Scottish lad, is in love with Airleen MacGregor, the daughter of Laird MacGregor of MacGregor Manor. She returns his love and cares naught for his poverty, but their happiness is suddenly interrupted when the elder MacGregor learns of their intentions. His wrath is mighty and Robert is ordered to keep away from his daughter. That evening hearing that America is a land of gold, he decides to go and win riches in order to marry Airleen. He writes her a note asking her to meet him that night at the old trysting place. This note is intercepted by MacGregor who compels Airleen to write him an answer to the effect that she has been amusing herself at his expense, and is through with him. This forced answer is sent to Robert by the Laird. The poor lad is dumbfounded and stunned. Airleen writes him another note explaining how she was forced to write the first one, but this is lost in the post office and Robert sails to America in ignorance of Airleen's true love. The years pass, Robert has prospered and grown wealthy. Airleen ever and always has waited at the old trysting place, hoping, praying for the return of her "laddie".

One day, by a trick of chance, Robert passes through the town of his boyhood days. The old post office is being torn down and moving the fixtures. Airleen's long lost letter is found and sent to Robert.

With many misgivings, but a ray of hope still kindled, he makes all haste to the old trysting place and there he finds his boyhood sweetheart still waiting. Thus, trust and perseverance sometimes had its reward, as in the cast of the Laird's Daughter

== Cast ==
- Allen Mathes - Robert MacDonald
- Adrienne Kroell - Airleen MacGregor
- Walter Roberts - Douglas MacGregor
