= Nobody's Boy (1913 film) =

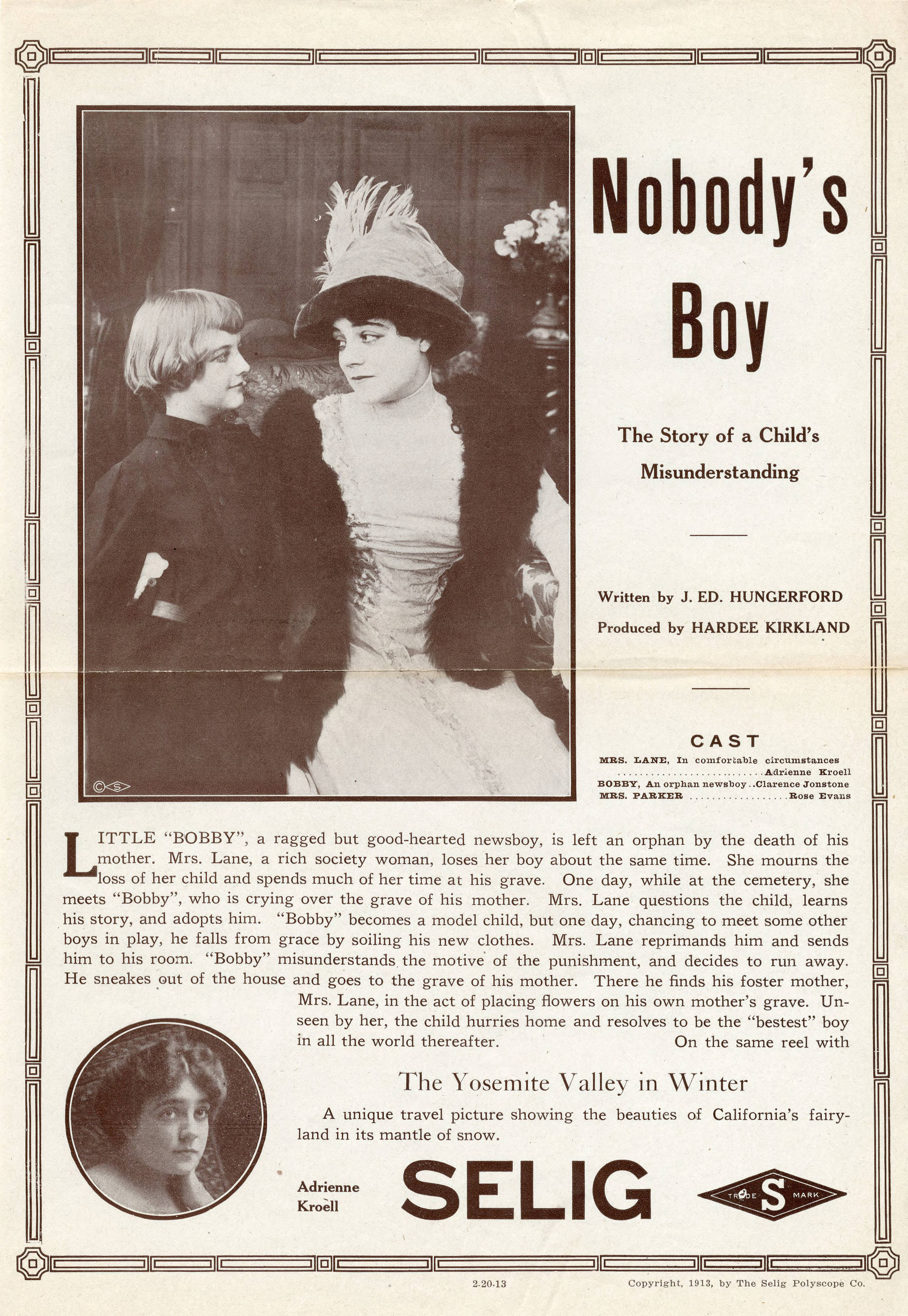
- Release flier to Nobody's Boy and featured Clarence Johnson (as Clarence Jonstone) and Adrienne Kroell
- Written by: J. Ed. Hungerford
- Produced by: Hardee Kirkland
- Starring: Adrienne Kroell; Clarence Johnson; Rose Evans
- Distributed by: Selig Polyscope Company
- Release date: February 20, 1913 (U.S.)
- Running time: 1 reel
- Country: United States
- Languages: Silent; English intertitles

Nobody's Boy is a 1913 American silent film drama produced by Hardee Kirkland. The film stars Clarence Jonstone, Adrienne Kroell and Rose Evans. The film status is uncertain but a release flier survives which is now at the Margaret Herrick Library at the Academy of Motion Pictures Arts and Sciences, it was part of the Charles G. Clarke collection. Its reel was about 700 feet (210 meters) long. The film was released on the same reel with The Yosemite Valley in Winter.

== Plot ==
"Little Bobby", a ragged but good-hearted newsboy, is left an orphan by the death of his mother. Mrs. Lane, a rich society woman, loses her boy about the same time. She mourns the loss of her child and spends much of her time at his grave. One day while at the cemetery, she meets "Bobby" who is crying over the grave of his mother. Mrs. Lane questions the child, learns his story and adopts him. "Bobby" becomes a model child, but one day, chancing to meet some other boys in play, he falls from grace by soiling his new clothes. Mrs. Lane reprimands him and sends him to his room. "Bobby" misunderstands the motive of his punishment and decides to run away. He sneaks out of the house and goes to the grave of his mother. There he finds his foster mother, Mrs. Lane in the act of placing flowers on his own mother's grave. Unseen by her, the child hurries home and resolves to be the "bestest" boy in all the world thereafter.

== Cast ==
- Clarence Johnson (as Clarence Jonstone) - Mrs. Lane
- Adrienne Kroell - Bobby, an orphan newsboy
- Rose Evans - Mrs. Parker
