= Hardee Kirkland =

American actor (1868–1929)

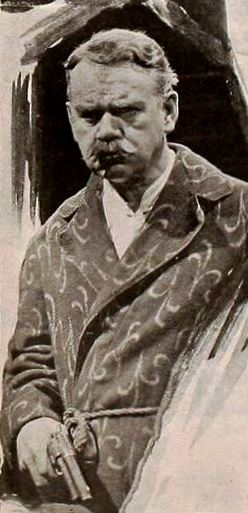
- Kirkland in 1920 advertisement for A Splendid Hazard
- Born: May 23, 1868; Savannah, Georgia, United States
- Died: February 18, 1929 (aged 60); Los Angeles, California, United States
- Occupations: Actor; Film director Stage
- Years active: 1912–1925
- Father: William Whedbee Kirkland
- Relatives: Odette Tyler (sister); William J. Hardee (uncle)

Hardee Kirkland (May 23, 1868 – February 18, 1929) was an American film actor and director of the silent era who appeared on stage.

== Early life ==
Kirkland was born in Savannah, Georgia, the son of former Confederate Brigadier General William Whedbee Kirkland. He was the elder brother of actress Elizabeth Kirkland, who performed as Odette Tyler. His maternal uncle William J. Hardee was also a Confederate general.

== Career ==
He appeared in more than 40 films between 1915 and 1925. He also directed more than 30 films between 1912 and 1914.

He died in Los Angeles, California, at the age of 60.

== Selected filmography ==
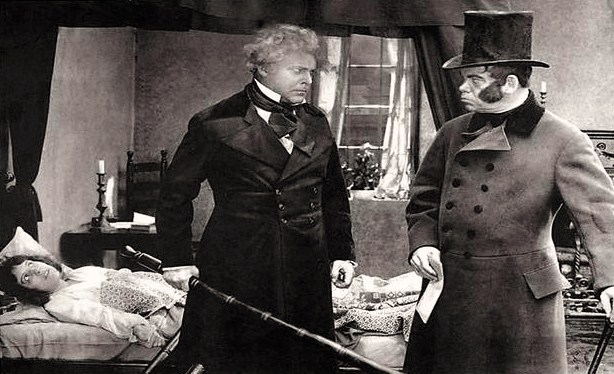
Gretchen Hartman(Mrs. Alan Hale), William Farnum and Hardee Kirkland in Les Misérables

=== As a director ===
- A Counterfeit Santa Claus (1912)
- The Awakening (1912)
- Her Bitter Lesson (1912)
- The Voice of Warning (1912)
- The Lost Inheritance (1912)
- A Man Among Men (1912)
- The Fire Fighter's Love (1912)
- Prompted by Jealousy (1913)
- The Clue (1913)
- The Empty Studio (1913)
- Don't Let Mother Know (1913)
- The Pink Opera Cloak (1913)
- Nobody's Boy (1913)
- A Change of Administration (1913)
- Tommy's Atonement (1913)
- The Ex-Convict's Plunge (1913)
- The Fate of Elizabeth (1913)
- Her Husband's Friend (1913)
- Through Another Man's Eyes (1913)
- The Adventures of a Watch; or, Time Flies and Comes Back (1913)
- The Price of the Free (1913)
- The Golden Cloud (1913)
- The Speedway of Despair (1914)

=== As an actor ===
- The Galley Slave (1915) – Baron La Bois
- The Lost Bridegroom (1916) – Black McQuirk
- Les Misérables (1917) – Javert
- When False Tongues Speak (1917)
- Five Thousand an Hour (1918)
- Eye for Eye (1918) – Rambert, curcis proprietor
- The Peace of Roaring River (1919) – Nils Olsen
- Johnny-on-the-Spot (1919) – Dr. Barnabas Bunyon
- The Master Man (1919)
- In Wrong (1919) – Henry Wallace
- Madame X (1920) – Dr. Chessel
- A Splendid Hazard (1920) – Admiral Killegrew
- Officer 666 (1920) - Police Captain
- From the Ground Up (1920) – Mr. Carswell, Sr.
- The Ace of Hearts (1921) – Mr. Morgridge
- A Perfect Crime (1921) – President Halliday
- The Lure of Jade (1921)
- Roads of Destiny (1921) – Mr. Hardy
- Ladies Must Live (1921)
- Youth to Youth (1922) – Mr. Taylor
- Without Compromise (1922)
- Very Truly Yours (1922) – Doctor Maddox
- They Like 'Em Rough (1922) – Richard Wells Sr.
- The Face Between (1922) – Mr. Hartwell
- Sherlock Brown (1922) – General Bostwick
- Youth to Youth (1922) – Taylor
- Hell's Hole (1923) – a guardian
- Are You a Failure? (1923) – Gregory Thorpe
- While Paris Sleeps (1923) – Mr. O'Keefe, Sr.
- Woman-Proof (1923) – Col. Lynwood
- The Mailman (1923) – Captain Franz
- The Arizona Romeo (1925) – John Wayne
- Bad Boy (1925) – father of Jimmie
- Private Affairs (1925)
- The Shadow on the Wall (1925) – Mr. Hode
