= The Cowboy Millionaire (1909 film) =

1909 film

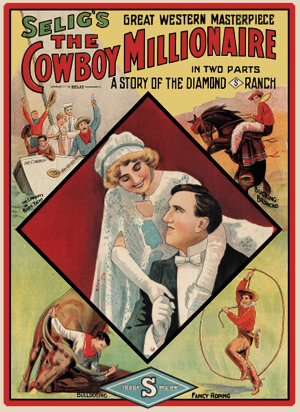
- Theatrical poster
- Directed by: Francis Boggs; Otis Turner
- Produced by: William Nicholas Selig
- Starring: Tom Mix; Mac Barnes; William Garwood
- Production company: Selig Polyscope Company
- Release date: October 21, 1909 (U.S.)
- Country: United States
- Languages: Silent; English intertitles

The Cowboy Millionaire

The Cowboy Millionaire is a 1909 American short silent Western film directed by Francis Boggs and Otis Turner. The film stars Tom Mix, Mac Barnes and William Garwood. It was the debut film of Mix and Garwood, as well as William Stowell.

== Plot ==
According to a film magazine, "Bud Noble is foreman on the Circle "D" ranch outside of Circle City, Idaho, and our opening scene pictures Bud as the cowboy roping and tying a steer. Then Saturday afternoon at Circle City the boys from Circle "D" ranch ride in for a half-day's holiday headed by Bud, who receives a shock. The local operator appears with a telegram : "Your Uncle John dead. You are sole heir to his estate valued at several millions. Come to Chicago at once." "One year later" Bud tires of society. We see Bud and his new wife entertaining, and our cowboy shows plainly that he is desperately weary of the effete east, then Bud goes to the club, and the men he meets there and their conversation get on his nerves. " After the theatre"—a return home and Bud longs for the fresh air of the vast west. As he sinks wearily into a chair a Remington painting catches his eye. It is one he had recently purchased—a broncho buster and his horse. The artist had caught the wild spirit of his subject, and as Bud's mind returns to scenes of a similar nature, a happy inspiration comes. "By Jove, I'll do it." He seizes a telegraph form, rings for his butler and sends the following message: "This high brow life is killing me. Am sending you special train. Bring the whole outfit, band, horses and all. This town needs excitement. Come and help wake it up.—Bud." A few days later we see the boys at a swell suburban depot. Bud and his wife are in their auto, and the punchers in chaps and sombreros soon create a world of excitement on the city streets. Then Bud takes the boys yachting; next to see a melodrama, where the Colonel takes exceptions to the villain's heartless treatment of "Bertha, the Sewing Machine Girl." At his wife's request Bud sends the cowboys back home, and settles down to town life."

== Cast ==
- Tom Mix
- Mac Barnes
- William Garwood
- Adrienne Kroell
- William Stowell
- Carl Winterhoff
