= Thomas Commerford =

American actor

- Born: September 1, 1855; New York City
- Died: February 17, 1920 (aged 64); Chicago, Illinois
- Other names: Tom I. Comberford; T. I. Comberford
- Occupation: Actor

Thomas Commerford (August 1, 1855 in New York City - February 17, 1920 in Chicago) was an American male actor on stage and in silent films. He was also known as Tom I. Comberford and T. I. Comberford.

Commerford debuted in the Old Drury Theater, then worked with the troupes of Edwin Arden and Dore Davidson. He appeared in Lincoln J. Carter productions for more than 25 years. In 1913, he began acting in films with Essanay Studios.

== Filmography ==
- The Two Orphans (1911)
- A Summer Adventure (1911)
- His Better Self (1911)
- Under Suspicion (1912)
- The Miller of Burgundy (1912) - Bontemps (Bontempts), billed as T. I. Comberford
- The Girl at the Cupola (1912)
- Just His Luck (1912)
- Pierre of the North (1914)
- The Spirit of the Madonna (1914)
- Yarn a-Tangle (1914)
- Ashes of Hope (1914)
- At Night With a Million (1914)
- At the Foot of the Hill (1914)
- His Stolen Fortune (1914)
- One Wonderful Night (1914) - Earl of Valleford
- The Other Man (1914)
- Graustark (1915)
- The Fable of a Night Given Over to Revelry (1915)
- On Trial (1917)
- The Fable of the Uplifter and His Dandy Little Opus (1917)
