= A Counterfeit Santa Claus =

1912 film by Hardee Kirkland

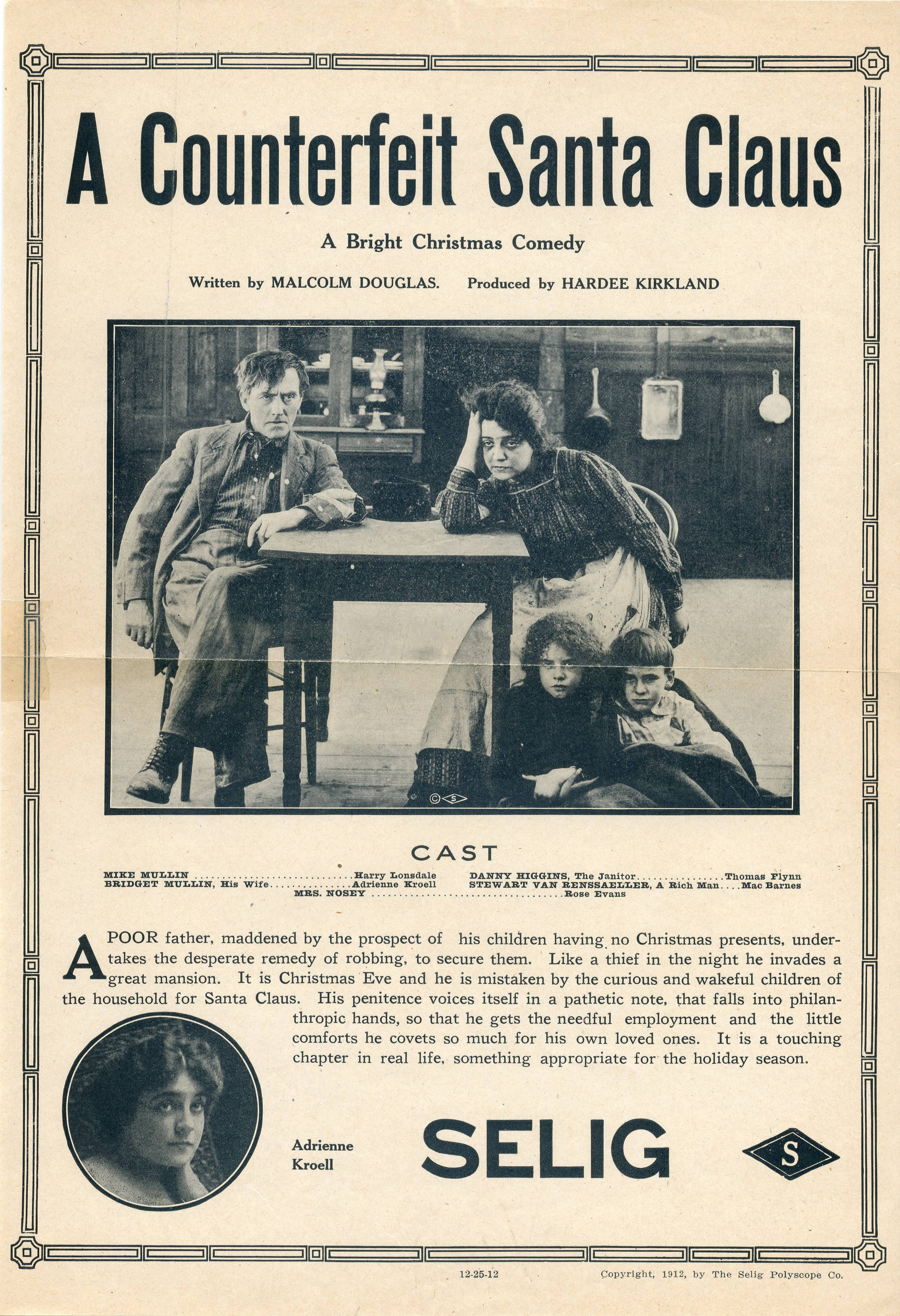
Release flier for A Counterfeit Santa Claus, 1912

A Counterfeit Santa Claus is an American drama film directed by Hardee Kirkland from December 1912. The now lost film was distributed by the Selig Polyscope Company.

== Plot ==
The Mullins' situation is bleak. The couple sits at an empty table in their poorly furnished apartment. The two children are sitting on the floor next to them, with their bedding pulled over their shoulders to keep them warm. The small family's woes increase as the landlord wants them evicted because of their rent arrears. Mike Mullin goes looking for work, but is repeatedly harshly rejected. Mike tries to beg on the street, but no one gives him anything.

Mike stops in front of a house with obviously wealthy residents and decides to steal what he cannot otherwise get. He enters a room where the two children of the household had hung their stockings in anticipation of presents. The parents had decorated the room for Christmas with a tree and prepared a Santa Claus costume for the presents. Mike takes Santa's big sack and throws in the silver cutlery from the dining room. He then takes some presents from the tree for his own children and puts on his Santa Claus costume.

The children wake up and come down to take a curious look at Santa. Mike sends them both back to bed and tells them to be quiet. The father hears the muffled voices and hides behind the curtains with his revolver drawn. Mike has come to his senses and wants to leave the bag with the loot behind. He attaches a piece of paper to it, but before he can take off the costume he is surprised by the host at gunpoint. The father demands that the message be released. The note says, "My wife and children are starving. I came into the house to steal. But I want to go as an innocent man and continue to trust in God's help."

Mike tells the landlord the whole story. He writes him a check and promises to give him a job after Christmas. When Mike arrives at his apartment laden with food and gifts for the children, he is greeted by his happy wife and children. The previously barren and poor home is now a real home with warmth and security.

== Background ==
A Counterfeit Santa Claus is 1009 feet long and was published on December 25, 1912. The film is lost.

A film with the same title released in 1911 by the Selig Polyscope Company is mentioned in the literature. The director is said to have been Otis Turner, and the actors are Hobart Bosworth, Olive Cox, Bebe Daniels and Lillian Leighton. This information can be traced back to the work The Braff Silent Short Film Working Papers by the American author Richard Braff, published in 2002. Braff is considered unreliable among cineastes and he does not adequately cite his sources. If this film existed at all it probably was not finished and was not released.
