= Charles G. Clarke =

American cinematographer

Charles Galloway Clarke
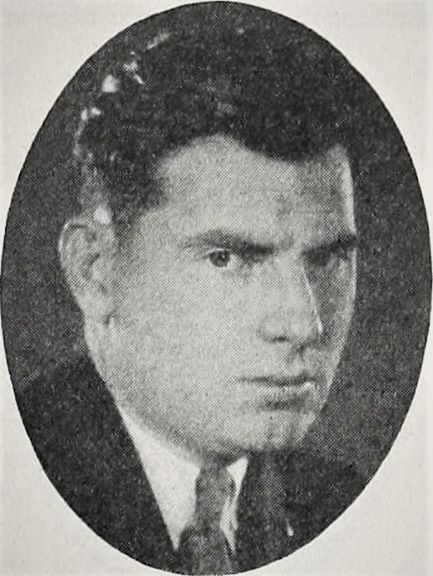
- 1926 magazine photo
- Born: 10 March 1899; Potter Valley, California, U.S.
- Died: 1 July 1983 (aged 84); Beverly Hills, California, U.S.
- Occupation: Cinematographer
- Years active: 1920–1960s

Charles G. Clarke ASC (March 10, 1899 – July 1, 1983) was an American cinematographer who worked in Hollywood for over 40 years and was treasurer and president (twice: 1948–50 and 1951–53) of the American Society of Cinematographers.

== Career ==
Clarke started his career as an assistant cameraman to Allen Siegler at Universal Pictures in 1915. After serving overseas with the U.S. Army during World War I, he returned to work as an assistant cameraman with the National Film Company and Oliver Morosco Company. Subsequently promoted to cinematographer on the 15-part silent film serial The Son of Tarzan (1920), he worked across a broad spectrum of film, including standard film serials at the independents, to showcase musicals and major studio epics. From 1927 to 1933, he was first cameraman at the Jesse Lasky Company.

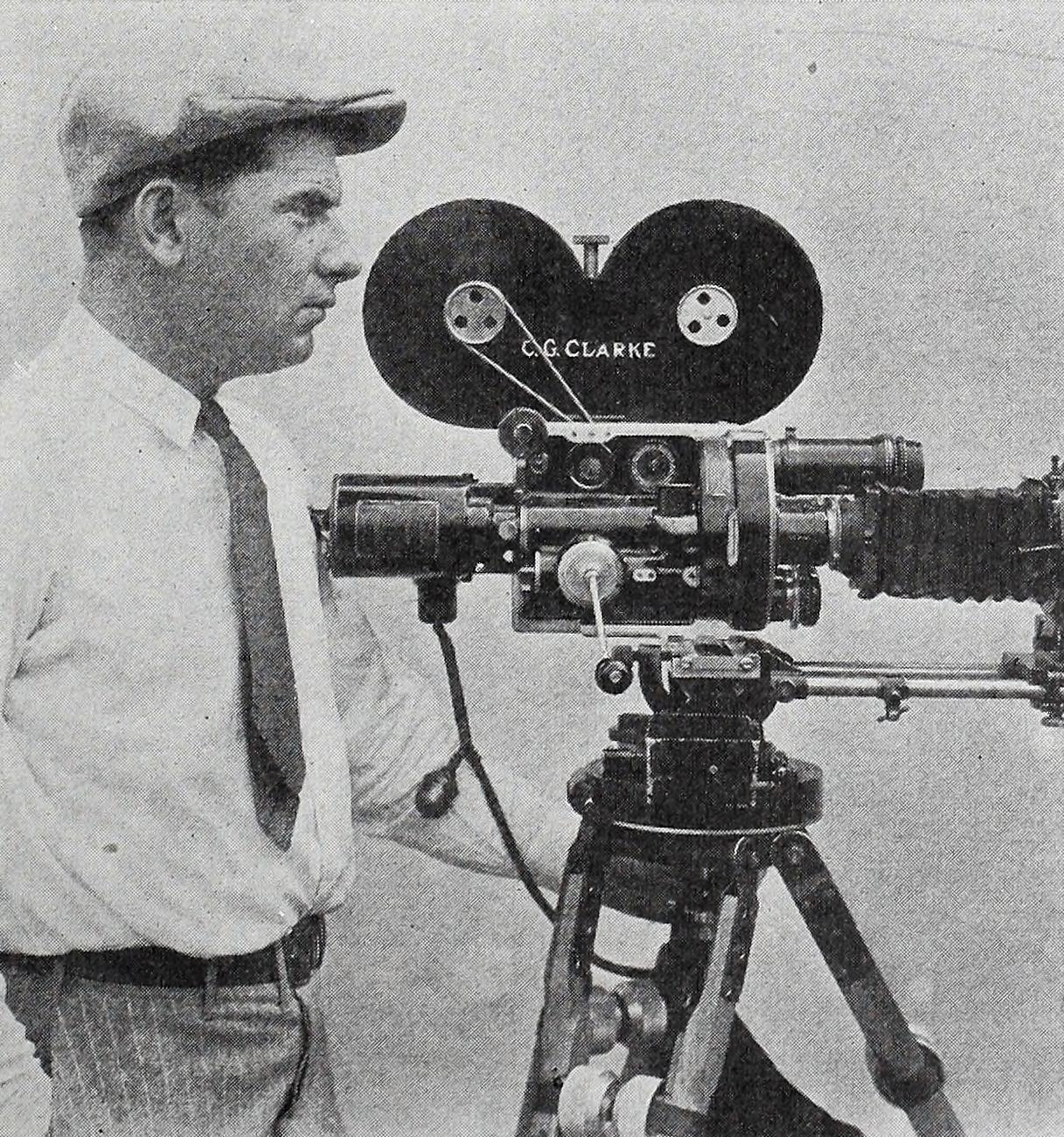
Clarke with his camera c. 1927

He was responsible for all of the China location footage and much of the studio work for MGM's The Good Earth (1937) but was uncredited. After working on a number of movies for Fox Films in the 1930s, he moved to MGM. In 1938, he returned to the now 20th Century-Fox and worked the majority of his subsequent career at the studio.

He worked on low-budget Mr. Moto and Charlie Chan pictures to help produce propaganda material such as Guadalcanal Diary (1943) to pictures Thunderhead, Son of Flicka (1945) and Miracle on 34th Street (1947) to big CinemaScope musicals Marching Along (1952).

He was married to Marian Bowden and died at his home in Beverly Hills, California, in 1983.

== Teacher ==
Whilst on the shoot for Marines, Let's Go in Japan, Clarke suffered a minor heart attack and retired from work. However, former friend and Fox producer Kenneth Macgowan persuaded Clarke to join the Theater Arts Department at UCLA. Clarke taught film school and wrote a book titled Professional Cinematography at the urging of his students in 1964. In 1976 he published Early Film Making in Los Angeles, which recounted his time during the early years of Hollywood and how the technology of cinematography changed.

== Selected filmography ==
- The Half Breed (1922)
- Slippy McGee (1923)
- Java Head (1923)
- Salomy Jane (The Law of the Sierras) (1923)
- The Light That Failed (1923)
- The Top of the World (1924)
- Without Mercy (1925)
- Friendly Enemies (1925)
- Going Crooked (1926)
- Singed (1927)
- Upstream (1927)
- The Loves of Carmen (1927)
- Sharp Shooters (1928)
- Riley the Cop (1928)
- Sin Sister (1929)
- Not Quite Decent (1929)
- Words and Music (1929)
- The Veiled Woman (1929)
- Oh, For a Man! (1930)
- Temple Tower (1930)
- So This Is London (1930)
- Girls Demand Excitement (1931)
- Annabelle's Affairs (1931)
- Second Hand Wife (The Illegal Divorce) (1933)
- Hot Pepper (1933)
- The Cat and the Fiddle (1934)
- Tarzan and His Mate (1934)
- Viva Villa! (1934)
- The Winning Ticket (1935)
- The Casino Murder Case (1935)
- Woman Wanted (1935)
- The Perfect Gentleman (1935)
- The Garden Murder Case (1936)
- Every Sunday (1936)
- The Thirteenth Chair (1937)
- Charlie Chan in Honolulu (1938)
- Pardon Our Nerve (1939)
- Frontier Marshal (1939)
- The Return of the Cisco Kid (1939)
- Mr. Moto Takes a Vacation (1939)
- Viva Cisco Kid (1940)
- Street of Memories (1940)
- Romance of the Rio Grande (1941)
- Dead Men Tell (1941)
- The Cowboy and the Blonde (1941)
- The Bride Wore Crutches (1941)
- Moontide (1942)
- A Gentleman at Heart (1942)
- Time to Kill (1942)
- Hello, Frisco, Hello (1943)
- Guadalcanal Diary (1943)
- Thunderhead, Son of Flicka (1945)
- Smokey (1946)
- Three Little Girls in Blue (1946)
- Miracle on 34th Street (1947)
- Captain from Castile (1947)
- That Wonderful Urge (1948)
- The Iron Curtain (1948)
- Green Grass of Wyoming (1948)
- Sand (1949)
- Slattery's Hurricane (1949)
- I'll Get By (1950)
- The Big Lift (1950)
- Golden Girl (1951)
- Red Skies of Montana (1952)
- Kangaroo (1952)
- Stars and Stripes Forever (1952)
- City of Bad Men (1953)
- Destination Gobi (1953)
- Night People (1954)
- Suddenly (1954)
- Black Widow (1954)
- Prince of Players (1955)
- Violent Saturday (1955)
- The Virgin Queen (1955)
- The Man in the Gray Flannel Suit (1956)
- Carousel (1956)
- Stopover Tokyo (1957)
- The Wayward Bus (1957)
- The Barbarian and the Geisha (1958)
- The Hunters (1958)
- These Thousand Hills (1959)
- Holiday for Lovers (1959)
- The Sound and the Fury (1959)
- Flaming Star (1960)
- Return to Peyton Place (1961)
- Madison Avenue (1961)
