= Columbia Eneutseak =

Inuk actress

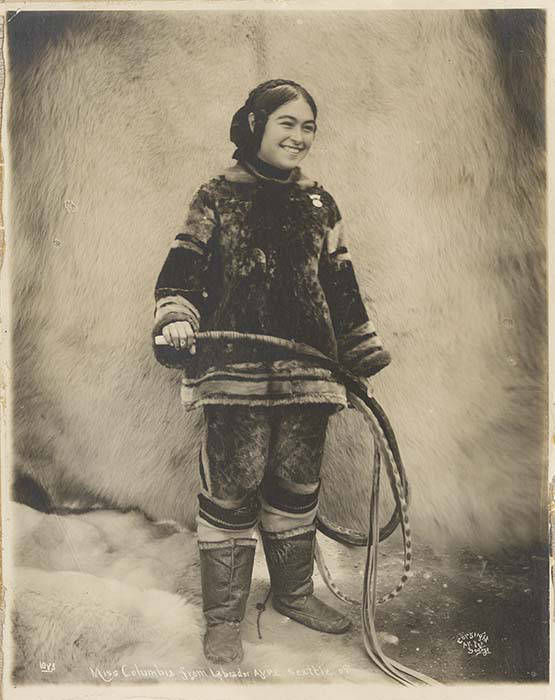
- Eneutseak posing with a whip, 1909
- Born: Nancy Helena Columbia Palmer; January 16, 1893; Chicago, Illinois, U.S.
- Died: August 16, 1959 (aged 66); Los Angeles, California, U.S.
- Other names: Nancy Columbia, Nancy Melling
- Occupations: Performer, writer
- Spouse: Raymond S. Melling
- Parent: Esther Eneutseak (mother)
- Relatives: Ross Elliott (son-in-law)

Columbia Eneutseak (January 16, 1893 – August 16, 1959), also billed as Nancy Columbia, was an American performer in silent films, known for writing and starring in The Way of the Eskimo (1911).

== Early life ==
Nancy Helena Columbia Palmer was born at the World's Columbian Exposition in Chicago in 1893, the daughter of Esther Eneutseak. Her family were Inuit, from Labrador, part of the "Eskimo Village" ethnographic exhibit at the exposition. She was named by Bertha Honore Palmer, a white socialite and head of the exposition's Board of Lady Managers.

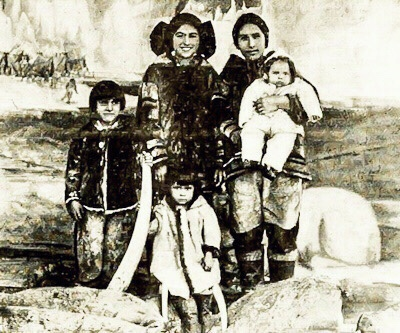
Eneutseak (center) with her mother and three siblings, 1911

Eneutseak was a child when she appeared in similar exhibits at the Cotton States and International Exposition in Atlanta in 1895, and the Pan-American Exposition in Buffalo, New York in 1901, and in traveling shows with the Barnum & Bailey and Ringling circus companies, and at Coney Island. From 1896 to 1899, she was in Labrador with her grandparents. From 1899 to 1901, she joined her family on a tour in England, Spain, France, Italy, and North Africa. In 1904, she was part of the Eskimo Village at the Louisiana Purchase Exposition in St. Louis. Her name, likeness, and biography were included in school textbooks and other publications.

== Career ==
In 1909, Eneutseak was voted "Queen of the Pay Streak" at the Alaska–Yukon–Pacific Exposition in Seattle. Soon after, Eneutseak starred in the Selig Polyscope Company's The Way of the Eskimo (1911, now lost) based on a story she wrote while she was a teenager. She also appeared in Lost in the Arctic (1911), The Seminole's Sacrifice (1911), The Witch of the Everglades (1911), Life on the Border (1911), God's Country and the Woman (1916), The Flame of the Yukon (1917), and The Last of the Mohicans (1920).

In 1915, after appearing at the Panama–Pacific International Exposition in San Francisco, Eneutseak and her family moved to Santa Monica, California, to establish an "Eskimo Village" attraction on the city's Ocean Park pier; their attraction and several others were destroyed by fire in Ocean Park at the end of 1915. After marriage and motherhood, she managed an apartment building in Southern California.

== Personal life ==
Eneutseak married projectionist Raymond S. Melling in the 1920s; they had a daughter, Esther Sue Melling, born in 1927, who married actor Ross Elliott in 1954. Eneutseak had a stroke in 1948, and died in 1959, aged 66 years, in Los Angeles. From 2014 to 2018, there was an exhibit about Eneutseak at the Velaslavasay Panorama in Los Angeles.
