= Harry Buckwalter =

American photographer

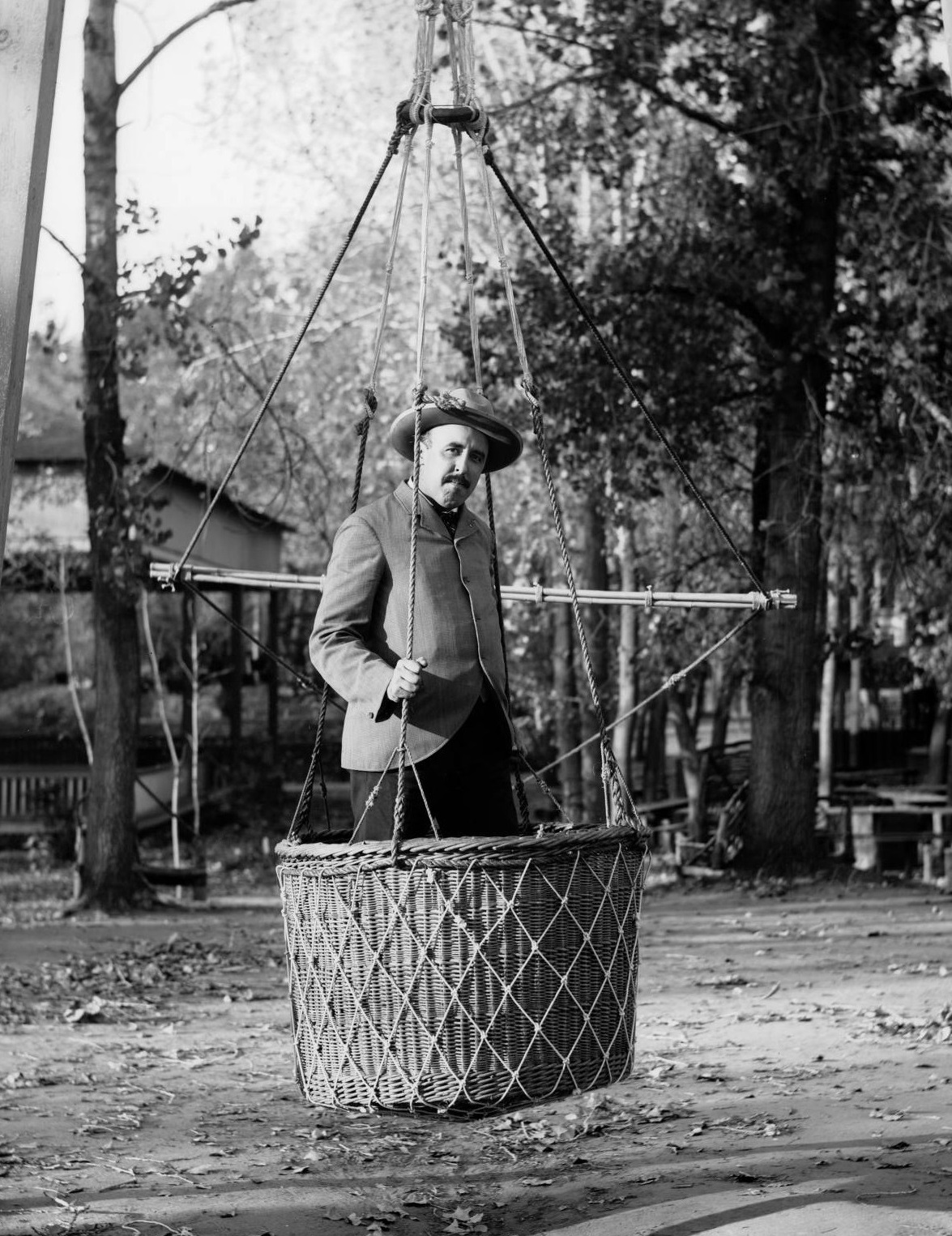
- Born: Harry Hale Buckwalter; November 1, 1867; Reading, Pennsylvania
- Died: March 7, 1930 (aged 62)
- Occupations: Photographer; photojournalist; film director
- Spouse: Carrie Emmajean Fuller

Harry Hale Buckwalter (November 1, 1867 – March 7, 1930), sometimes credited as Harry H. Buckwalter or Henry H. Buckwalter, was an American photographer, journalist, photojournalist, and silent film director and producer.

== Biography ==
=== Early life and photojournalism ===
Harry Hale Buckwalter was born in Reading, Pennsylvania to Andrew Collins and Mary Elizabeth (Ritter) Buckwalter. He left for the American West at the age of 16. In Colorado Springs he met his future wife, Carrie Emmajean Fuller, born in New York in 1868, whom he married in 1889. They moved to Denver and had two children, John in 1894 and Margaret in 1899.

In 1892, he became interested in photography and began his career at The Denver Republican as a printer, and then as a reporter and photographer at the Rocky Mountain News of Denver, the first daily newspaper founded in Colorado. His photos were first reproduced by artists using wood block illustrations, and later in halftone as printing technology in the region advanced.

In 1894, Buckwalter teamed with balloonist Ivy Baldwin for a series of aerial photographs of Colorado. Baldwin's balloon was not capable of lifting both men, so Buckwalter made a solo ascent launching from Elitch Gardens in Denver. His article "Dancing in the Air" and photographs of the experience was one of the first examples of photojournalism in the American West.

=== X-ray lawsuit ===
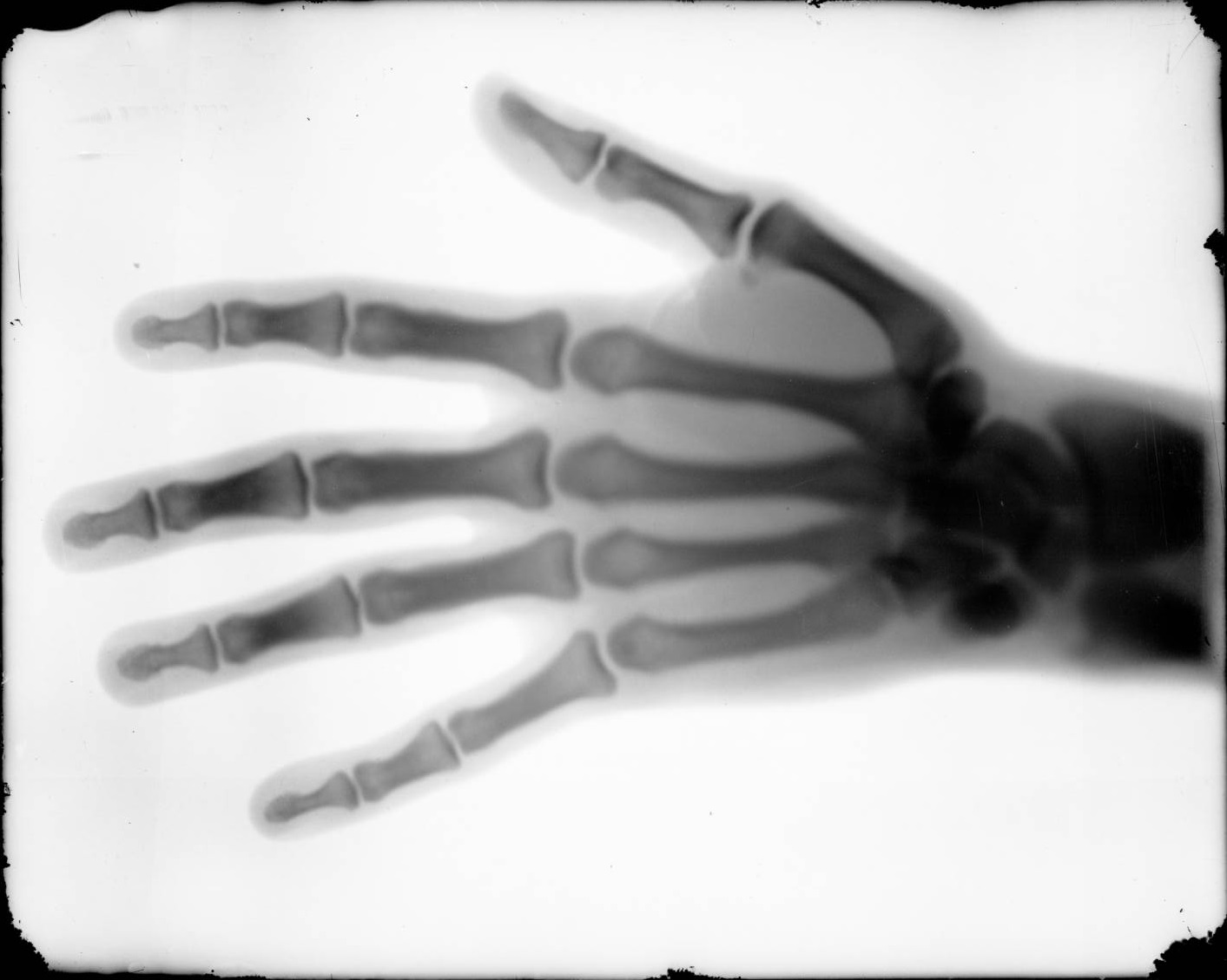
X-ray of the hand of Dr. Tennant taken by Buckwalter

In 1895, Buckwalter took interest in X-ray technology, after its discovery by professor Wilhelm Röntgen earlier that year. Sponsored by the Rocky Mountain News, Buckwalter partnered with physician C. E. Tennant and the Homeopathic Medical College of Denver on a series of X-ray photograph experiments. For the experiment Buckwalter produced X-ray tubes locally using leaded glass which was previously thought to be unsuitable, but the experiment proved that leaded tubes could produce a clear image. The X-ray images were the first produced in the American West and among the earliest in the country.

After the Rocky Mountain News published the results of the experiment, Buckwalter and Tennant were contacted by attorneys Ben Lindsey and Fred W. Parks to examine a client in a malpractice lawsuit with the new technology. The lawsuit represented James Smith, who had fractured his leg after falling from a ladder. He was examined by Dr. W.W. Grant, who misdiagnosed the fracture, insisting the leg was merely stiff. Instead of immobilizing the limb he prescribed exercises which exacerbated the injury. Case number 24159 was heard in the District Court of Arapahoe County (now Denver) on December 2, 1896, by Judge Owen Le Fevre, who allowed Buckwalter and Tennant to testify as expert witnesses and present their findings. The defense objected unsuccessfully to the court, arguing X-rays were the "testimony of a ghost". The X-rays along with the testimony of Buckwalter and Tennant proved that there was a fracture in the leg. The landmark case marked the first time that X-ray evidence was admitted into a court of law.

=== Travelogues ===
Buckwalter began making travelogues for railway companies documenting the scenes of the West, where he experimented and made improvements to high speed camera shutter designs. Many of these early films were featured in Hale's Tours of the World, an early amusement ride that took place inside a replica train car. In 1900, Buckwalter started a collaboration with the director and producer William Selig, a filmmaker in Chicago and became the Western agent for Selig Polyscope Company, selling and distributing Selig projectors and films to theaters in the region.

By 1902 Buckwalter founded a studio called Buckwalter Films and began directing and producing silent films shorts beginning with The Girls in the Overalls, a story of seven sisters who run a family ranch after the death of their parents, in one of the earliest western films in America. The Royal Photographic Society awarded Panorama of the Royal Gorge and Panorama of Ute Pass top prize at an exhibit in 1903. Several of Buckwalter's documentary films were exhibited at the 1904 St. Louis World's Fair.

=== Later life ===
In 1905, Buckwalter was invited to film and document President Theodore Roosevelt's hunting trip in western Colorado.

In 1910 Buckwalter Films became part of General Film Company. His last known film, a documentary on the construction of the Panama Canal, was shot in 1913, while he was simultaneously carrying out a photographic report on the subject.

The History Colorado Center with the Denver Public Library hold a collection of Buckwalter's photos and glass plate negatives. Many of Buckwalter's films are considered lost.

Harry Buckwalter died on March 7, 1930, at the age of 63.

== Partial filmography ==
A list of known films directed and produced by Harry Buckwalter:

1901

- Indians and the U.S. Army

1902

- The Girls in the Overalls
- Panoramic View of Seven Castles
- Panoramic View of Hell Gate
- Panorama of the Royal Gorge
- Train in the Royal Gorge
- Burlington Flyer at Riverside
- Horse Toboggan Slide
- Panorama of Ute Pass
- Denver Fireman's Race for Life
- Where Golden Bars Are Cast
- Fun in the Glenwood Springs Pool
- Runaway Stage Coach
- Clear Creek Canyon
- Panorama of the Famous Georgetown Loop
- Ute Pass Express
- Lava Slides in Red Rock Canyon
- Climbing Hagerman Pass
- Trains Leaving Manitou
- Leaving the Summit of Pike's Peak
- Colorado Springs Scenes
- Panorama of Denver from a Balloon
- Santa Fe Railroad at La Junta, Colorado
- Ute Indian Snake Dance
- Panorama of Platte Canyon
- Pueblo, Colorado Fire Department in Action
- Panoramic View of Granite Canyon

1903

- Story of the Rose

1904

- Tracked by Bloodhounds; or, A Lynching at Cripple Creek
- Trip Through Colorado
- Canyon of the Phantoms
- History of Cripple Creek
- The Hold-Up of the Leadville Stage
- Skinny and the Cop
- Mexican Bullfight
- Ride on the Moffat Road
- Trout Hatchery, Lake Alicia, Colorado

1905

- Denver in Winter
- President Roosevelt's Hunting Party in Colorado
- 200 Texas Girls Vacationing at Boulder Chautauqua

1906

- Tour of Denver
- Trip Over Cripple Creek Short Line
- Assault on the Umpire
- Argentine Central Railway
- Albuquerque, New Mexico, City Tour
- Ute and Navajo Dances and Races

1907

- Cooper
- The Girl from Montana

1908

- Transcontinental Car Race thru Cheyenne, WY

1913

- Panama and Panama Canal
