= The Girls in the Overalls =

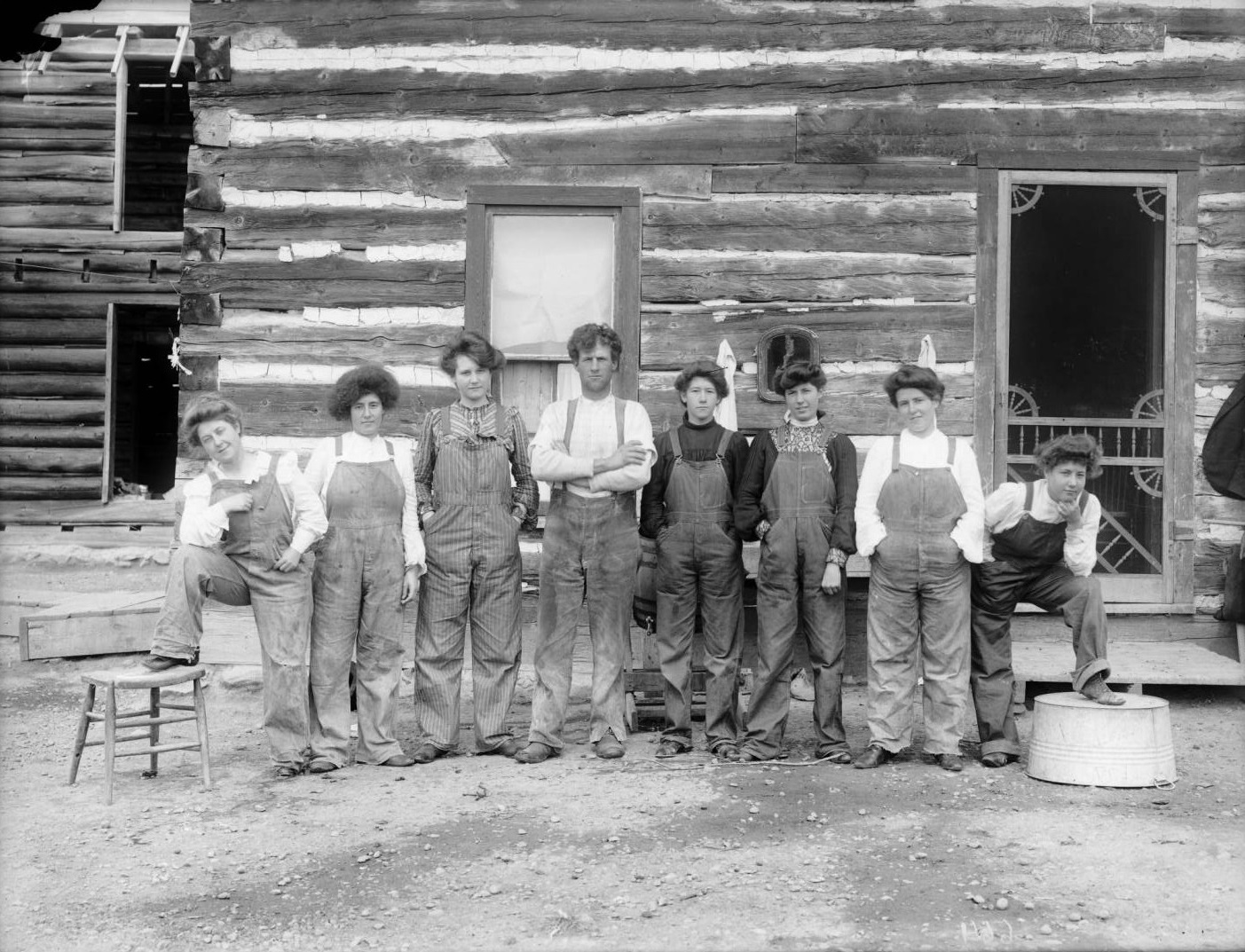
- Directed by: Harry Buckwalter
- Production company: Selig Polyscope Company
- Distributed by: Selig Polyscope Company, Kleine Optical Company
- Release date: November 1902
- Running time: 4 min (estimated)
- Country: United States

The Girls in the Overalls is a 1902 silent short film directed by Harry Buckwalter.

== Production ==
The Girls in the Overalls was filmed in 1902 and later became available in the Selig Polyscope catalog and was Harry Buckwalter's first film with a plot and storyline. His earlier films were experimental action vignettes and travelogues.

== Plot ==
The film is based on a true story of the Vidal Ranch near Gunnison, Colorado where Regis Vidal and his wife Albine raised seven daughters and one son. Falling on hard time Regis borrowed $15,000 against the ranch. Under stress to pay back the loan Regis died a year later, shortly followed by his wife, leaving the children deep in debt. Instead of selling, the children decide to come together work the ranch and pay off the debt. The film begins at the Vidal ranch house as the girls prepare to work in the field. The girls then cut and split firewood. They stop and eat watermelon for lunch, then play a game of leap frog. They go back to work raking hay in a field using a horse rake and then stack the hay into piles. After stacking the hay they climb and slide down the side of the haystack.

After the film was released the Vidal children received letters to make public appearances and offers to help with the ranch.
