= The Way of the Eskimo =

1911 film

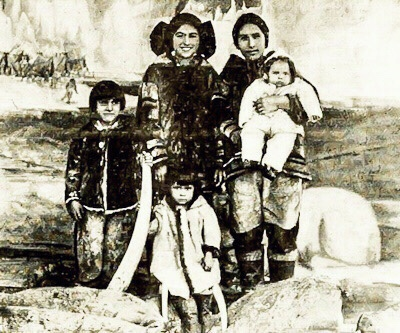
- Film promotion showing Columbia Eneutseak (center, rear) with her siblings and her mother Esther, 1911
- Directed by: William V. Mong
- Written by: Columbia Eneutseak (story); William V. Mong (scenario)
- Produced by: William N. Selig
- Starring: Columbia Enuteseak; Zacharias Zad; William V. Mong
- Production companies: Selig Polyscope Company, Chicago, Illinois
- Distributed by: The General Film Company
- Release date: July 17, 1911
- Running time: 995 feet (14-15 minutes)
- Country: United States
- Language: Silent (English intertitles)

The Way of the Eskimo is a lost 1911 American silent drama film that portrayed the Inuit or "Eskimo" culture of northeastern Canada along the coast of Labrador. Directed by William V. Mong and produced by Selig Polyscope Company, this "photoplay" was based on a love story written by Columbia Eneutseak, a young Inuk woman who was born in the United States in 1893, in the "Esquimaux Village" exhibition at the World's Columbian Exposition in Chicago. (Note: In period media and in official records, the spelling of “Eneutseak" often varies, cited instead as Enutseak, Enuteseak, Eustinuck, and Enutisak. According to the referenced 2014 article by Kenn Harper, Columbia's mother around 1905 adopted the Inuit surname Eneutseak, which in English means "good person".) She, fellow Inuk performer Zacharias Zad, and William Mong costarred in the film with a supporting cast that included members of Columbia's immediate family and other Inuit players. While this production was promoted in 1911 as being filmed on location in northern Canada, it was actually shot that year at the snow-covered port town of Escanaba, Michigan, along a frozen stretch of shoreline of Little Bay de Noc, which connects to Lake Michigan.

No copies of the motion picture are listed among the holdings of major film repositories in the United States, Canada, the United Kingdom, or the European Union. It is therefore currently classified as lost.

== Plot ==
This film is described in 1911 trade publications as a story of adventure and romance set in the Eskimos' "land of eternal ice". The motion picture, according to reviews and plot descriptions in those publications, opened with scenes of daily activity among a small village of natives led by old Chief Opetek. The tribe later conducts its annual ceremony of bidding farewell or adieu to the sun as the vast territory enters the dark season of winter. Zak, a young man from another distant tribe, is visiting Opetek to participate in the event and to see the chief's beautiful daughter Ananak, whom he intends to marry.

After the sun ceremony, Zak departs on his dog sled to return to his own people. On his journey home over the ice, he soon finds a "half-frozen" white man, a trapper. Zak takes the unconscious stranger back to Opetek's family, and the man awakens under the care of Ananak and her mother Tikatak. Zak now prepares to depart for his home once again, and in keeping with their social customs, he and Ananak say good-bye by smelling the sleeves of one another's sealskin jackets and then rubbing noses. The recovering white trapper observes the couple's interaction, and after Zak leaves he talks to Ananak and ridicules the Eskimo way of showing affection, telling her that men and women in his culture display their affections in much different ways. Ananak over the dark months of winter finds herself increasingly attracted to the hunter. With the change in seasons and the approach of warmer, brighter days, and while her parents are away, Ananak elopes with the white man, who soon deserts her. Zak, now traveling by kayak, manages to track her down and save her from drowning herself to end her shame. He then takes Ananak back home, where they marry after the tribe's medicine man uses sacred oils to cleanse her of the trapper's "evil spirits". The couple then depart for Zak's village, where together they can begin a new life.

== Cast ==
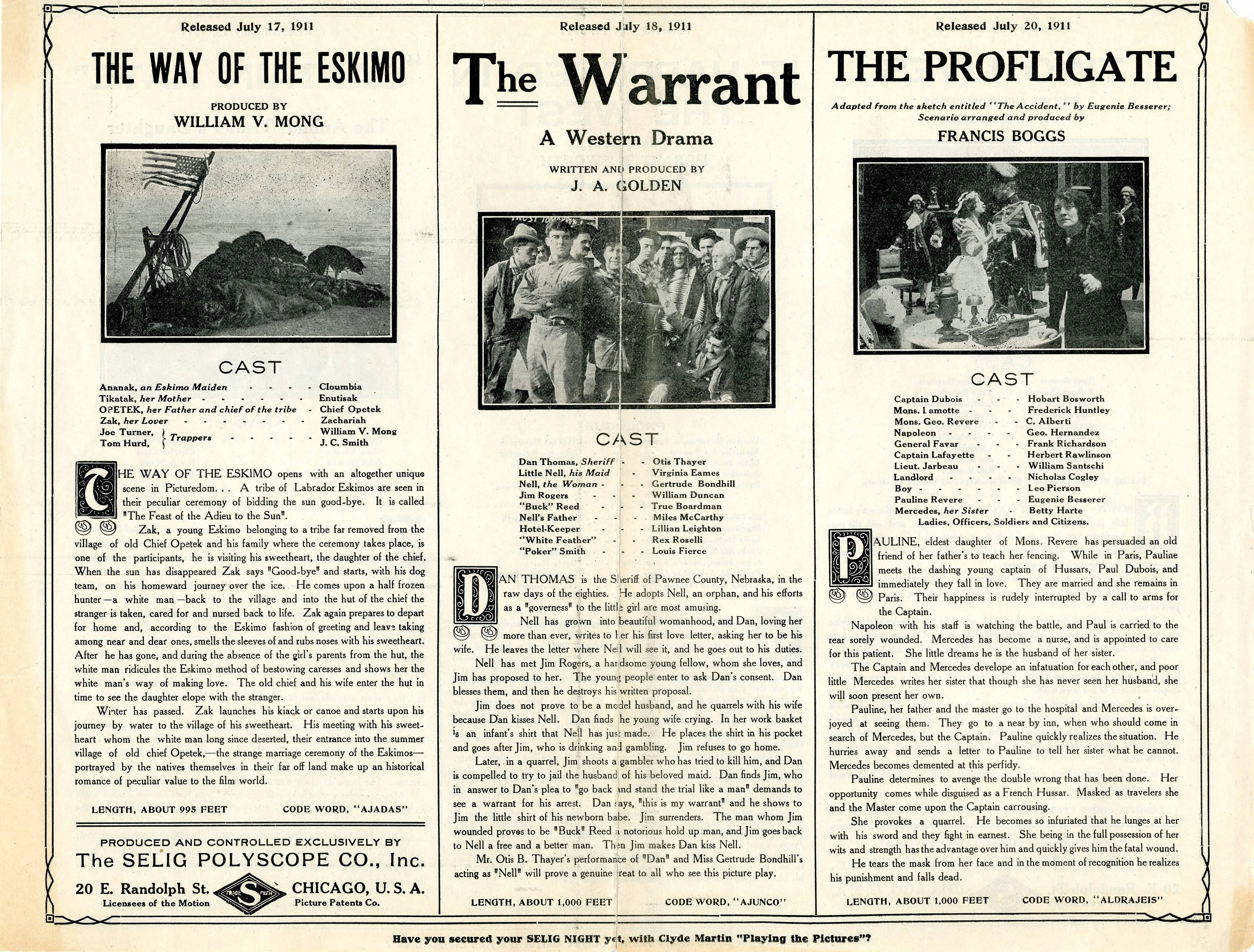
Selig promotion of three of its films in 1911, including (left) The Way of the Eskimo

- Columbia Eneutseak as Ananak ("Eskimo Maiden") (Note: The actress known as Columbia Eneutseak referred to herself and was cited in the print media by various other names during her lifetime. Her reported birth name is Nancy Helena Columbia Palmer (Palmer being the surname of her Chicago "godmother"). Later, Columbia is identified as "Miss Columbia", Columbia Smith, Nancy Columbia, Nancy Enuteseak (with assorted spellings of this surname), Nancy Smith, and finally by her married name as cited in her 1959 obituary: Nancy Smith Melling.)
- Zacharias Zad as Zak (Ananak's suitor)
- William V. Mong as Joe Turner (1st trapper)
- J. C. Smith as John Hurd (2nd trapper)
- Chief Opetek as chief of the tribe (Ananak's father)
- Eneutseak as Tikatak (Ananak's mother)
- Norman Smith as Inuk boy (uncredited) (Note: In addition to Columbia, three other younger children of Esther Eneutseak Smith also participated in the film. The children's presence on location in Michigan and on the winter set are documented in photographs of the production preserved by the county historical society in Escanaba.)
- Florence Smith as little Inuk girl (uncredited)
- Oscar Smith as Inuk baby (uncredited)

== Production ==
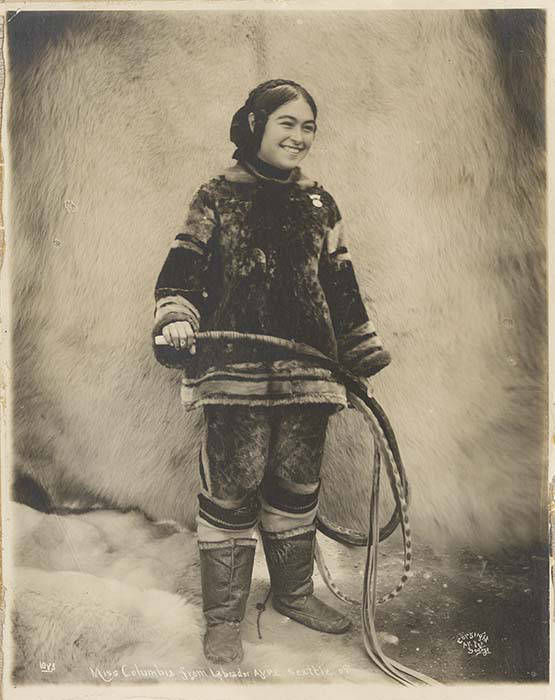
Columbia Eneutseak

The film's original storyline was written by its costar 18-year-old Columbia Eneutseak, who was born at the World's Columbian Exposition in Chicago in 1893. Her mother, Esther, was among a group of Inuit men, women, and children from the Davis Inlet area of Labrador who were brought to Chicago to build and inhabit an Eskimo Village or "human ethnic exhibit" during the exposition's six-month run. Much later, in 1910, after traveling for years and demonstrating various aspects of Eskimo culture at other expositions and special events, Columbia's family and some of their fellow Inuit performers met Seilig director William Mong. He invited the troupe to work in films, initially casting them as extras portraying Seminole and Plains Indians in three one-reel dramas. (Note: Prior to The Way of the Eskimo, the three Selig films in which Columbia, her mother, and some other Inuit players performed were shot on location in Jacksonville, Florida in 1910 and released in 1911. Their titles are The Witch of the Everglades, The Seminole's Sacrifice, and Life on the Border. All of these films survive in whole or in part and are available for viewing on YouTube.) Then, acting on Columbia's proposed screen story, Mong produced The Way of the Eskimo, which trade publications described at the time of its release in July 1911 as "the first of a series of pictures made by Selig in the far north last winter". In reality, however, the Eskimo one-reeler was not filmed in either the Arctic or along the northern coast of Labrador; it was shot much farther south in the United States, in Escanaba, Michigan, located about 300 miles due north of Selig's corporate headquarters in Chicago. Situated next to the Little Bay de Noc linked to Lake Michigan, Escanaba with its heavy winter snows and ice-bound shoreline was a more convenient, visually credible alternative to filming in far-off Labrador. (Note: After completing the Native American films in Florida in 1910, Director Mong took his troupe of Inuit players and support crew to Chicago and then up to Escanaba to produce their "Arctic" photoplays.) Today, nearly a dozen photographs documenting that 1911 filming are preserved by the Delta County Historical Society in Escanaba.

While shooting the film in Escanaba "in early 1911", Mong maximized location costs by also shooting a second one-reeler there, Lost in the Arctic. That production included the same principal cast as this film as well as additional Inuit performers. In its July 1911 issue, the Chicago-based trade journal Motography continues to promote The Way of the Eskimo being filmed in Labrador. "The land of the Eskimo", announces the publication, "has been invaded by Selig camera men, and now real Eskimo dramas, played by real Eskimos in native ice wastes, can be seen", adding "'The Way of the Eskimo,' released July 17, is one of them." Yet, despite such media hype, Selig's decision to shoot the films in Michigan rather than in the remote regions of Labrador is not surprising. The costs in both time and money to send even a small company of cast and crew all the way to northeastern Canada were probably deemed far too high, especially for the purposes of producing just two one-reelers.

To enhance the "Arctic" realism of filming in Michigan, Mong staged a hunting expedition and killing of a nonindigenous polar bear in Escabana, an event documented among the photographs held today by the noted historical society. Selig in 1911 maintained a growing menagerie of wild and domesticated animals for use in its productions, including three live bears and "10 eskimo dogs". Most likely, the company shipped to Escanaba one of those bears from its large studio "plant" in Chicago or possibly from the company's newer, rapidly expanding "Pacific Coast" facilities in Edendale, Los Angeles. A live walrus was apparently shipped as well to Escanaba for the same purposes. In its July 1911 issue, the Chicago-based trade journal Motography states, "A valuable polar bear is slain in one of these far north plays and an Eskimo is seen killing the wary walrus by his primitive methods." The telling word regarding the bear in that report is "valuable", a strong implication that the animal was from Selig's menagerie, one its more expensive purchased specimens. While it is possible that some footage of the bear roaming on the ice or its killing was also used in The Way of the Eskimo, it is more likely the footage was used entirely in Lost in the Arctic. Selig advertisements and trade reviews for the latter production refer specifically to the "harpooning" and "thrilling" death of the polar bear, and one of the characters in that film is identified as "The Bear Hunter".

== Reception ==
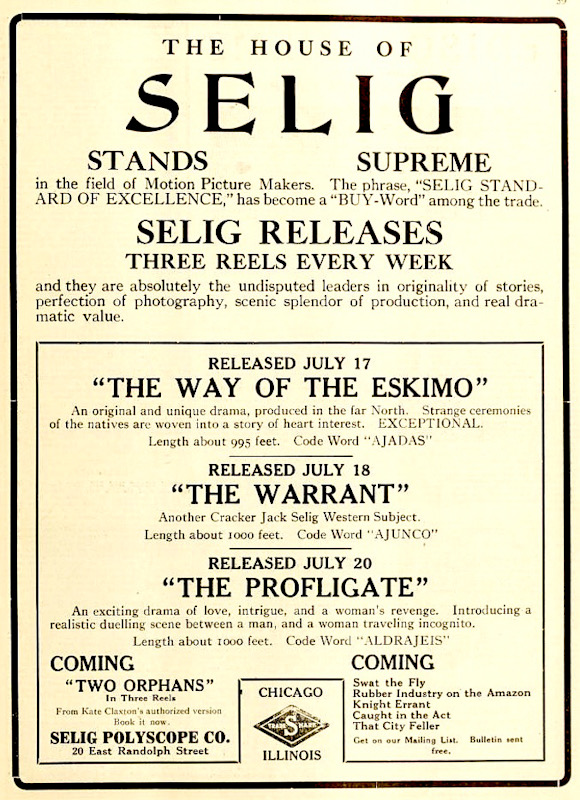
Promotion of "a story of heart interest" that was "produced in the far North".

In trade publications in 1911, the film received generally positive reviews. The Moving Picture World in its July 29 review states, "This picture is unusual enough and good enough to make a good feature picture." The journal then remarks, "It is markedly educational and it tells a very interesting story. The story in this setting, primitive and simple, has much beauty...It is very commendable. A week later, in its August 5 issue, The Moving Picture World highlights the film again with a photograph of Columbia posing with her siblings and her mother, noting that audiences should find the film of "peculiar interest" since "the leading part has been taken by a young Eskimo girl of American birth". Cincinnati-based trade magazine The Billboard judged the "Eskimo love story" to be an "oddity" but "a very well acted little play".

== "Lost" film status ==
No copies of this one-reel Selig production are preserved in Library of Congress, the UCLA Film Archives, in the collection of moving images at the Museum of Modern Art, the George Eastman Museum, the Library and Archives Canada (LAC), or in other film repositories in the United States, Canada, or Europe. The film is therefore classified or "presumed" to be a lost production. Unfortunately, the images featured on this page are among the few that survive in available 1911 trade publications, although the noted photographs preserved at the Delta County Historical Society in Escanaba do provide some visual documentation of Mong's location work there.
