= Esther Eneutseak =

Inuk performer and actor

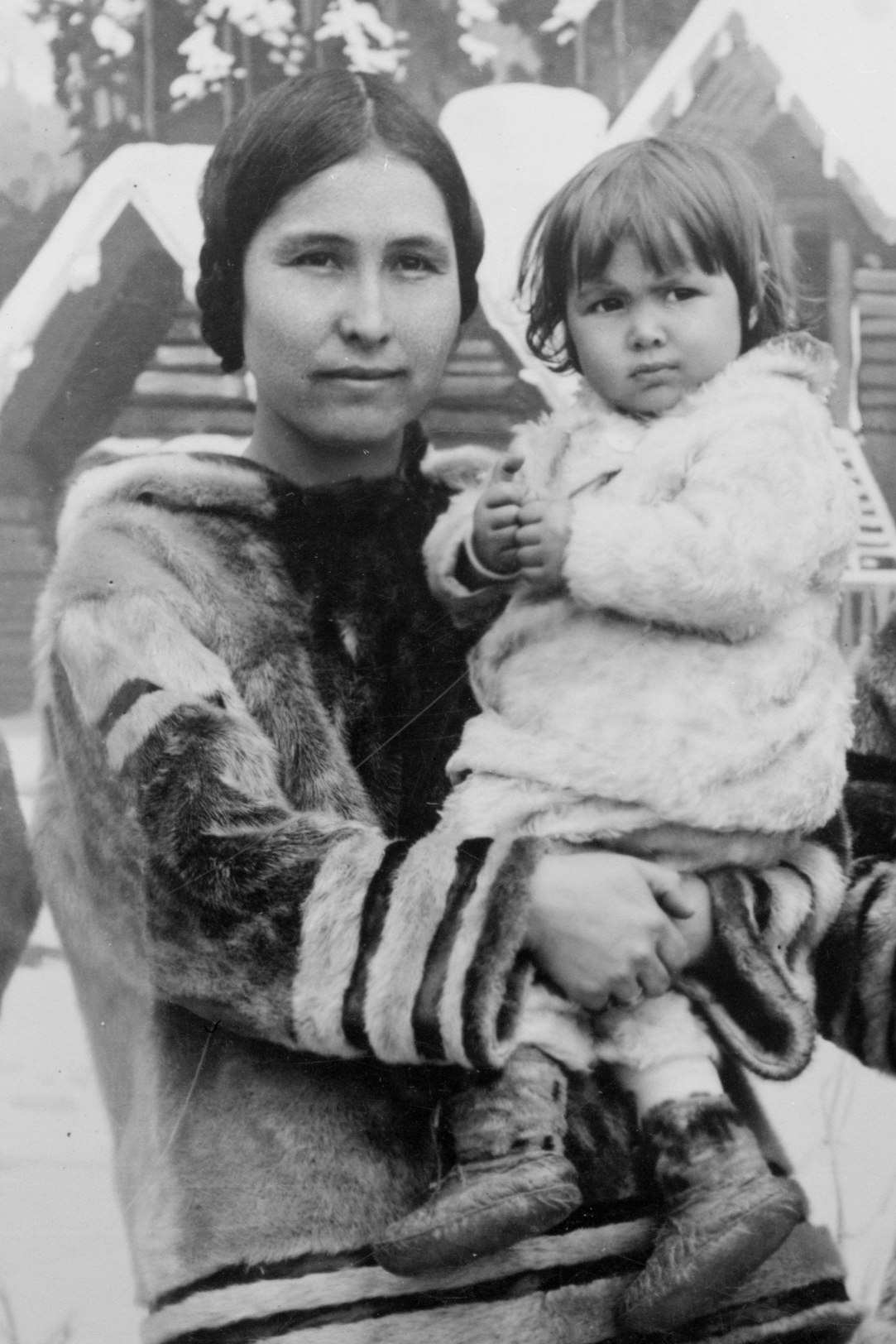
- Eneutseak holding daughter Florence in 1909
- Born: 1877; Nain, Labrador, Newfoundland Colony
- Died: 1961 (aged 83–84)
- Occupation: Performer
- Spouse(s): Charles Bein (c. 1896), John Casper Smith (c. 1903)
- Children: Nancy Columbia (born 1893), Norman (born 1903), Florence (born 1907), Oscar (born c. 1910), Sidney (born 1912)

Esther Eneutseak (1877–1961) was an Inuk performer and actor. Originally from Nain, Labrador, she performed at "Inuit villages" at world's fairs and circuses, and in films with her daughter, Columbia Eneutseak. Her self-chosen surname means "good person".

== World's Columbian Exposition (1892–1896) ==
In 1892, Eneutseak and her parents, Helena and Abile, were part of a group of 60 Inuit from Labrador who had been recruited to appear in an ethnological exposition at the Chicago World's Fair. Three months before the fair officially opened, Eneutseak, who was 15-years old and pregnant, gave birth to a daughter in Chicago. The child was named Nancy Helena Columbia Palmer after her grandmothers, the official name of the fair (the Columbian Exposition), and for socialite Bertha Palmer, whom fair organizers had asked to be the child's godmother.

A dispute over living conditions led to most of the Inuit leaving the exposition before it officially opened and establishing their own "Eskimo Village" outside of the fairgrounds, adjacent to Buffalo Bill's Wild West show. Instead of returning to Labrador after the fair closed in October 1893, the family started a touring show, appearing at expositions, state fairs, and alongside the Barnum & Bailey Circus.

After several years on the carnival circuit, Eneutseak's parents chose to return to Labrador in 1896, taking Columbia with them. By that time, Eneutseak had married Charles Bein and chose to stay with him in New York. Little is known of her life in New York; she did find some work as a seamstress at the American Museum of Natural History.

== Reunion and touring (1899–1910) ==
After three years apart, Eneutseak returned to Labrador in 1899 along with promoter Ralph Taber to recruit Inuit to tour Europe. The assembled a group of 30 people, mostly relatives, including her parents and her daughter, departed for England on the steamship Erik in October. The troupe performed as "The Eskimo Encampment" at the Olympia Exhibition Centre in London over the winter season. In the spring they moved on to Madrid, and then Barcelona, although Eneutseak appears to have returned to America with her husband in April. She reunited with the group the next year when they arrived in New York for the 1901 Pan-American Exposition in Buffalo.

By the time the company arrived at their next engagement at the South Carolina Inter-State and West Indian Exposition, promotion responsibilities had been taken over by John Casper Smith, and by 1903 he had become Eneutseak's husband. In 1905 her father died in Coney Island, and over time the group dwindled as members, including her mother, returned to Labrador.

The remaining company, consisting of Eneutseak, her husband, her children, and two other men who may have also been relatives, continued to tour. They appeared at the 1909 Alaska-Yukon-Pacific Exposition (where Columbia was elected "Queen of the Carnival"), and again in Denver, before establishing a permanent Eskimo Village attraction in Ocean Park, California, in 1910.

== Film career ==
While the group was in Buffalo in 1901, Eneutseak and the other performers became the subjects of the first motion pictures ever made of Inuit. Edison Studios produced three short films of the troupe performing at their faux-village at the exposition: "Esquimaux Village", "Esquimaux Game of Snap-the-Whip" and "Esquimaux Leap-Frog". The rival Biograph Company appears to have also recorded the Inuit performers, but no footage has survived.

By the end of the first decade of the twentieth century, the popularity of ethnic exhibitions was declining, while at the same time film was quickly emerging as a new mass media format. The family began to supply Hollywood studios with sleds, dog teams, furs, and costumes from their Ocean Park attraction for the popular Northern films, and even appeared as extras.

Columbia Eneutseak, who had grown up in the public eye and was by then an attractive, 18-year old young woman, was being cast in increasingly prominent roles, and in 1911 the Selig Polyscope Company filmed The Way of the Eskimo (now lost) based on a story she wrote. Columbia starred in the film and Esther Eneutseak played her mother, and the two would go on to appear in at least 19 films, either together or separately. They frequently played Inuit or Plains Indians, and on at least one occasion Esther Eneutseak was cast as a Japanese woman alongside Sessue Hayakawa.

== Later life ==
Eneutseak died in 1961.
