= Tracked by Bloodhounds; or, A Lynching at Cripple Creek =

- Directed by: Harry Buckwalter
- Production company: Selig Polyscope Company
- Distributed by: Kleine Optical Company
- Release date: April 1904
- Running time: 4 minutes
- Country: United States

Tracked by Bloodhounds; or, A Lynching at Cripple Creek is a 1904 silent crime drama short film directed by Harry Buckwalter.

== Plot ==
The film is set at a gold mining camp in Cripple Creek, Colorado where it was filmed. It begins as a man knocks on the door of a miner's cabin on Bennett Avenue. A kind and generous woman answers and offers the man food. He demands money and kills the woman after she refuses. The tramp searches the cabin and hides when he hears the woman's daughter approach. The tramp escapes before the husband of the woman returns and finds his murdered wife. The husband enlists the help of his neighbors who also bring bloodhounds. The hounds are given the scent of the tramp's hat that he left behind and they begin tracking him. The tramp resting under a tree hears the dogs approaching and escapes to the woods. A chase ensues through the forest and the posse fires at the tramp as they get closer. After crossing a small stream across a fallen tree one of the pursuers tackles the tramp to the ground and they roll down a mountainside. The tramp briefly escapes only to be trapped on a bridge crossing a deep ravine. The tramp shoots one of the pursuers and leaps off the bridge. He lands in the water and is met by another pursuer. The two fight until the other men arrive. The tramp is caught and brought to shore, where a rope is placed around his neck. The captured tramp is taken up a hill and to a tree. The rope is thrown over a limb of a tree, where the tramp is hung as the mob fires in the air. The final scene is a closeup of the bloodhounds and their handler.

The film runs over four minutes long and consists of 12 scenes.
