= Briton and Boer =

1909 film by Francis Boggs

- Directed by: Francis Boggs; William N. Selig
- Written by: William N. Selig
- Starring: Hobart Bosworth; Tom Mix
- Production company: Selig Polyscope Company
- Distributed by: Selig Polyscope Company
- Release date: October 25, 1909
- Running time: 1 reel
- Country: USA
- Language: Silent

Briton and Boer is a 1909 American short silent war film produced and distributed by Selig Polyscope Company.

== Plot ==
The film is set at the outset of the Boer War, beginning at the farm of Jobe De Larey, a Boer, and his family. His oldest daughter Gretchen and falls in love with Englishman Allen Hornby, superintendent of the mines, while attending an English school at Kimberly. Allen asks Jobe for consent to marry Gretchen and he refuses.

Gretchen overhears Jobe and Piet Cronje planning for war and intentions to seize the mines. She then sees Hans, a young Boer whom Jobe wanted her to marry, receive a message to seize the mines and capture Allen. Gretchen steals the message and Han's horse and rides to Kimberley to warn Allen. Gretchen is pursued after the message and horse are found missing, where at the bottom of the mine she refuses to leave and stays with Allen.

Three months pass when Piet captures a dispatch and learns the movements of a group of men Allen has organized against the Boers. With the information Piet sets a trap. Allen's men ride into the trap and a battle ensues. They escape when a passing regiment of Gordon Highlanders comes to their rescue. Piet and Jobe, fight several battles when Lord Roberts outwits the Boers and forces Piet to surrender.

Hans and Jobe escape and go to Kimberly at night. They seeks out Gretchen intending to kill her for her treason. Allen arrives in time and gets into a fight with Hans, who is killed. Two years after the war at Allen's home, Jobe begs his daughter's forgiveness. Allen and Jobe reconcile the past.

== Production ==
Scenes for the film were shot on location on the banks of the Des Plaines river, near the Chicago river canal. Briton and Boer starred Tom Mix, Hobart Bosworth, and Tom Santschi. This was the second film Tom Mix would appear in, and today is most likely a lost film.
