= The Coming of Columbus =

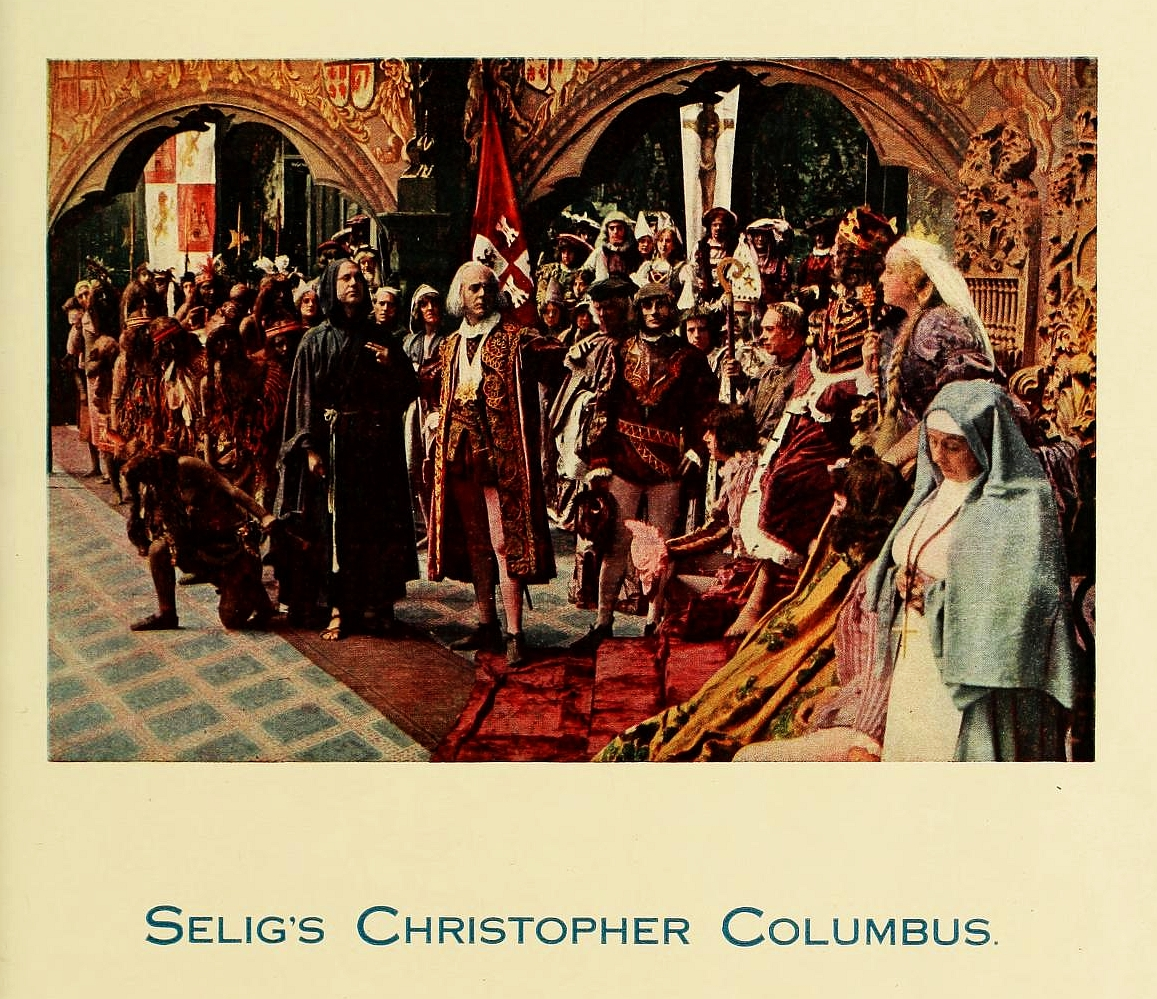
- 1912 Promotional Poster
- Directed by: Colin Campbell
- Written by: Charles E. Nixon
- Produced by: William Nicholas Selig
- Starring: Charles Clary; Kathlyn Williams; Hobart Bosworth; Tom Santschi
- Production company: Selig Polyscope Company
- Distributed by: General Film Company
- Release date: 6 May 1912
- Running time: 3 reels (approximate)
- Country: United States
- Language: Silent (English intertitles)

The Coming of Columbus is a 1912 American silent historical film produced by the Selig Polyscope Company and directed by Colin Campbell. The film dramatizes the life and voyages of Christopher Columbus and his discovery of the New World.

== Plot ==
A dramatized account of Christopher Columbus's efforts to secure backing from European courts, his departure and trans-Atlantic voyage, and his arrival in the Americas.

== Production ==
The film was produced by Selig Polyscope Company, using significant resources for its time, and incorporating large-scale production. All of the filming was done on site at the Selig Studios in Chicago, Illinois.

== Release and Reception ==
The film was marketed as “A Historical Review of Incidents in the Life and Discoveries of Christopher Columbus — A Magnificent Visualization in 3 Reels.” in a print ad in the Evening Capitol. According to The Sydney Morning Herald, the film was shown to Pope Pius X, to which he "drew from his Holiness special tributes of his pleasure and admiration for the product."

== Cast ==
- Marshall Stedman - King Ferdinand
- Kathlyn Williams – Queen Isabella
- Charles Clary – Christopher Columbus
- Frank Weed - Martin Pinzon
- Rex De Rosselli - Yanez
- William Stowell - Francisco De Boabadilla

== Historical significance ==
The Coming of Columbus is notable as one of the early multi-reel American historical spectacles produced by an independent studio. The production reflects the ambitions of early American film companies to stage large-scale narratives, drawing on historical material and recreations of exploration.

== Preservation status ==
There exists a print of the full film in the Library of Congress Paper Print Collection.
