= The Hold-Up of the Leadville Stage =

1904 film

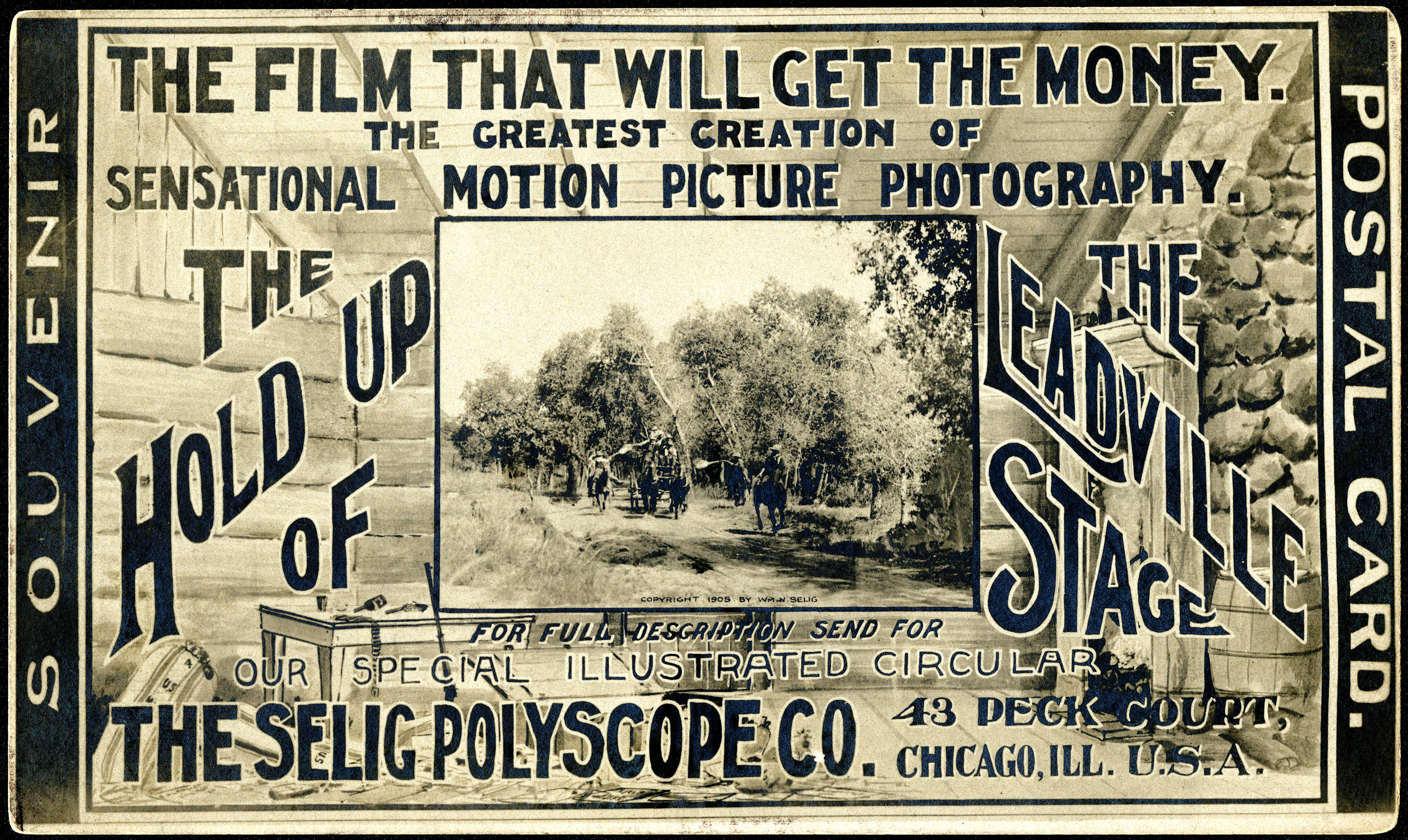
- Directed by: Harry Buckwalter
- Production company: Selig Polyscope Company
- Distributed by: Selig Polyscope Company
- Release date: October 1904
- Running time: 7 minutes (estimated)
- Country: United States

The Hold-Up of the Leadville Stage is a 1904 American short silent Western film directed by Harry Buckwalter.

== Production ==
The Hold-Up of the Leadville Stage sometimes billed as Robbery of the Leadville Stage was first released in New York, Boston, Chicago, San Francisco, and Los Angeles on October 23, 1904, and became available in the Selig Poliscope Catalog in April 1905.

During production a group of tourists traveling through the region saw the filming and, mistaking it for an actual robbery, began to fire on the crew. Nobody was injured in the exchange, but the incident prompted an investigation by the postal inspector, who questioned Buckwalter about his use of authentic mail bags as props.

== Plot ==
The film begins at the Bruin Inn, in North Cheyenne Canon, Colorado Springs, as the stage coach is departing for a relay station where the mail bags are transferred. The stage travels through the countryside passing scenic landmarks such as Ute Pass, North Cheyenne Canyon, Garden of the Gods, Pike's Peak, Cheyenne Mountain, and Cameron's Cone.

A group of bandits plot to capture the stage after hearing that it is transporting a Wells Fargo strong box containing a million dollars in gold from Horace Tabor's bank in Leadville to the Clark–Gruber mint in Denver. The bandits begin chasing the stage through canyon and over a bridge. As they close in a gun fight begins. One guard is killed and falls off the moving stage. People inside the stage begin hiding their valuables. The bandits take a short cut across the mountain and intercept the stage. The bandits search the passengers and off load the mail bags and strong box. One boy is shot as he tries to escape and a woman faints. After the bandits escape, the women load the body of the boy into the coach. The men from the stage mount horses and pursued the bandits. After a chase through the scenic countryside one bandit is lassoed to the ground and trampled by his horse. The chase continues for the other bandits who dismount their horse and try to escape on foot. A bandit is shot during the foot chase while the other two escape to a cabin carrying the mail bags and strong box. In the cabin the two bandits begin to open the bags and divide the money. One bandit cheats the other and both men draw their knives and begin to fight. During the struggle one bandit is killed. The final bandit takes the money and leaves the cabin to find the men from the stage have tracked him down. Shots are fired and after a struggle the bandit is captured.

Stills from the film
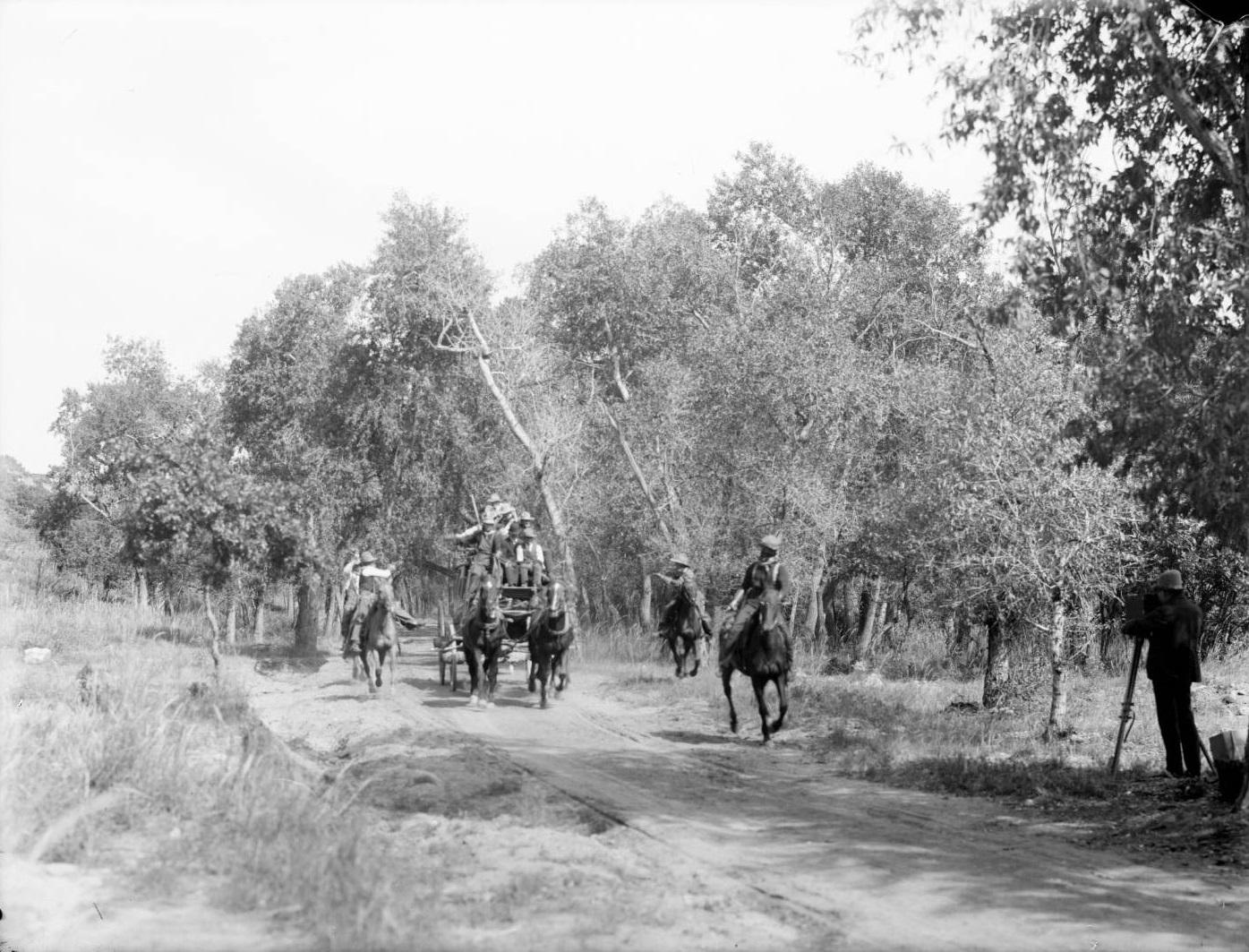
The bandits chasing the stage.

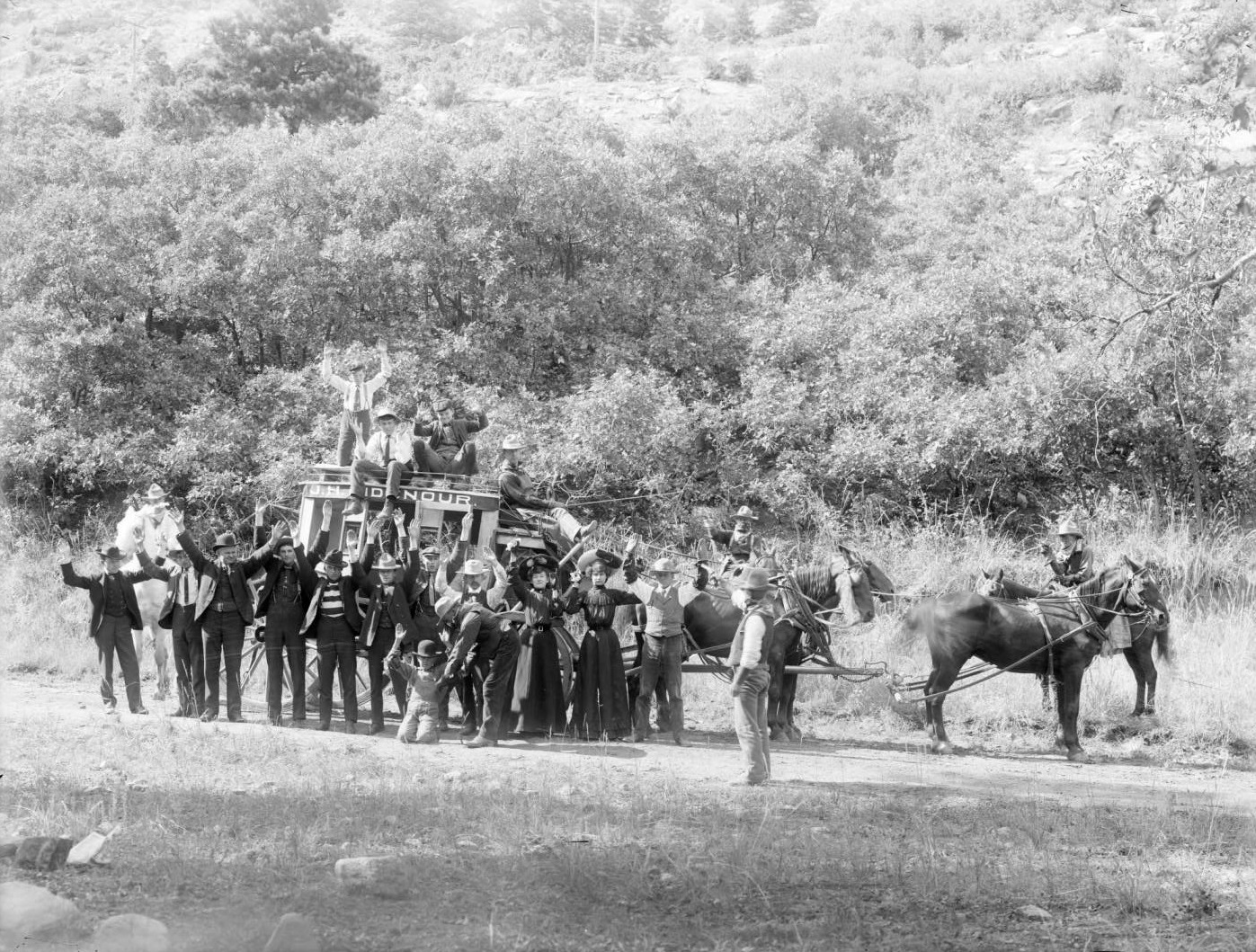
Robbery of the stage.
