= Selig Polyscope Company =

American motion picture company

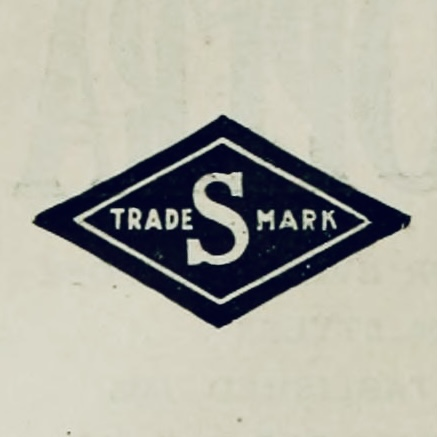
- Industry: Entertainment
- Founded: 1896
- Defunct: 1918
- Headquarters: Chicago; Los Angeles, United States
- Products: Motion pictures
- Owner: William Selig

The Selig Polyscope Company was an American motion picture company that was founded in 1896 by William Selig in Chicago, Illinois. The company produced hundreds of early, widely distributed commercial moving pictures, including the first films starring Tom Mix, Harold Lloyd, Colleen Moore, and Roscoe "Fatty" Arbuckle. Selig Polyscope also established Southern California's first permanent movie studio, in the historic Edendale district of Los Angeles.

Ending film production in 1918, the business, which had become known for its film production animals, became an animal and prop supplier to other studios and a zoo and amusement park attraction in East Los Angeles (Lincoln Heights). The amusement park and zoo went into decline during the Great Depression in the 1930s.

In 1947, William Selig and several other early movie producers and directors shared a special Academy Honorary Award to acknowledge their role in building the film industry.

== History ==
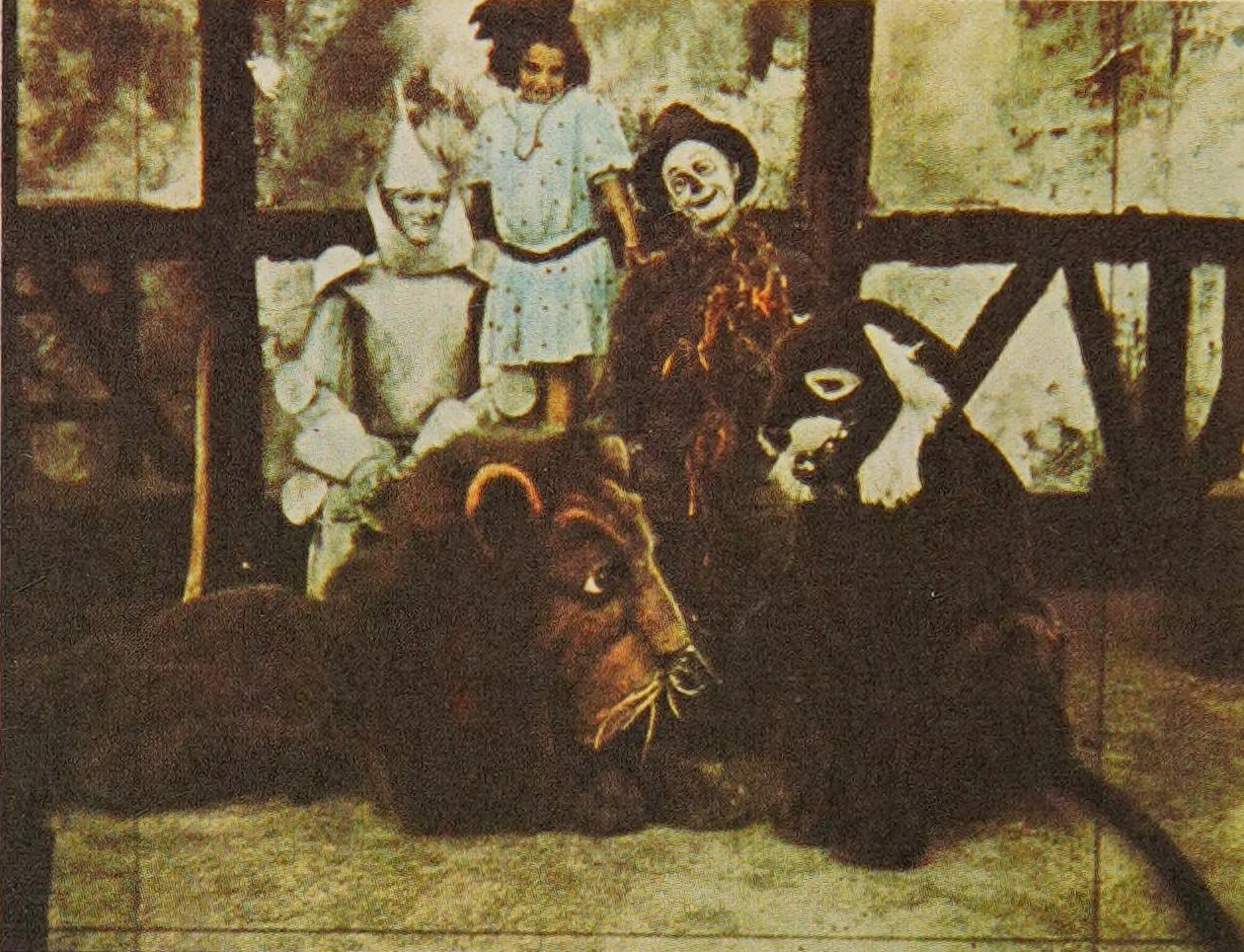
Surviving hand-tinted still from The Fairylogue and Radio-Plays (1908), based on L. Frank Baum's Oz books

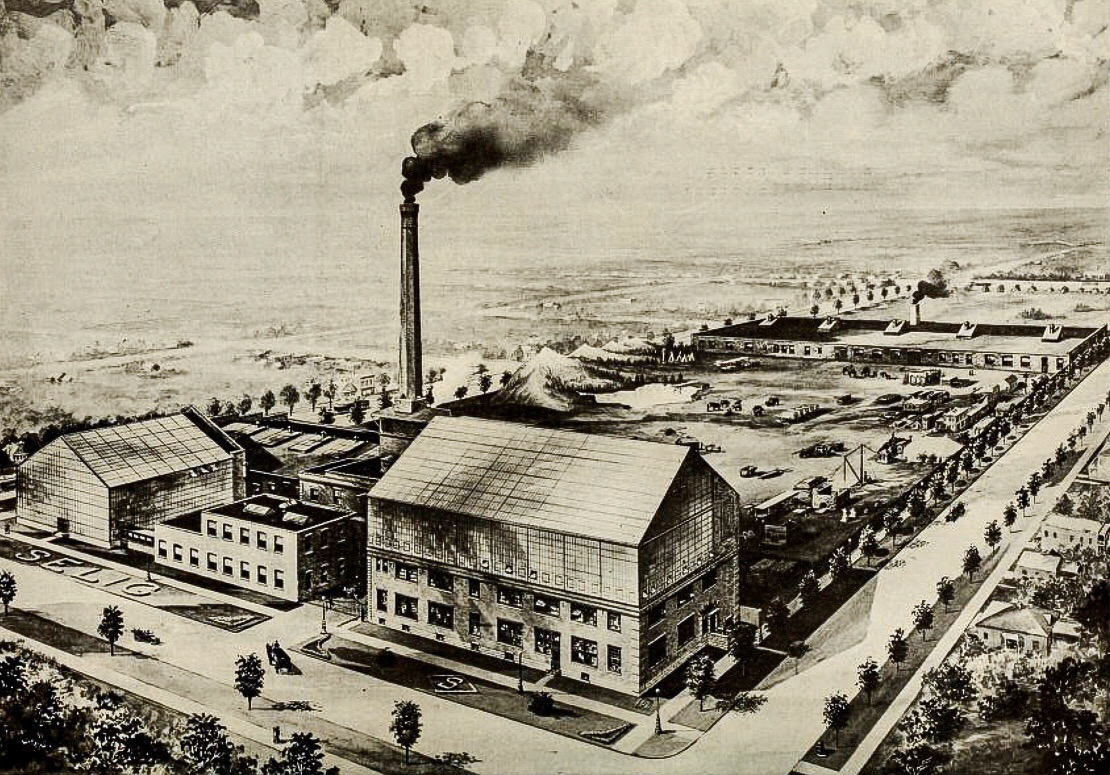
Selig studio facilities and extensive backlot in Chicago, 1911

William Selig initially worked as a Vaudeville magician in the Midwest and then a minstrel show operator on the west coast in California. Returning to Chicago, Chicago, he entered the film business using his own photographic equipment, free from the patent restrictions that were imposed through companies controlled by Thomas Edison. In 1896, with help from Union Metal Works and Andrew Schustek, he shot his first film, The Tramp and the Dog.

He then went on to successfully produce local actualities, slapstick comedies, early travelogues and industrial films (a major client was Armour and Company). In 1908, Selig Polyscope was involved in the production of The Fairylogue and Radio-Plays, a touring "multimedia" attempt to bring L. Frank Baum's Oz books to a wider public (which played to full houses but was nonetheless a financial disaster for Baum).

By 1909, Selig had studios making short features in Chicago and the Edendale district of Los Angeles. The company also distributed stock film footage and titles from other studios. That year, Roscoe Arbuckle's first movie was a Selig comedy short.

The company's early existence was fraught with legal turmoil over disputes with lawyers representing Thomas Edison's interests. In 1909, Selig and several other studio heads settled with Edison by creating an alliance with the inventor. Effectively a cartel, Motion Picture Patents Company dominated the industry for a few years until the Supreme Court (in 1913 and 1915) ruled the firm was an illegal monopoly.

In 1910, Selig Polyscope produced a wholly new filmed version of The Wonderful Wizard of Oz. The company produced the first commercial two-reel film, Damon and Pythias, successfully distributed its pictures in Great Britain, and maintained an office in London for several years before the outbreak of World War I. Although Selig Polyscope produced a wide variety of moving pictures, the company was most widely known for its wild animal shorts, historical subjects and early westerns.

In 1916, Selig Polyscope was hired by the Indiana Historical Commission to research, plan and film "the centennial historical picture of Indiana." Estimated to be a seven-reel production that would require the use of seven thousand feet of film, two reels were to be devoted to a prologue that detailed the state's early history, with the remainder of the reels to address the period of 1816 to 1916. Company location scouts reportedly searched for three hundred sites for actors and actresses to "re-enact the [historical] scenes on the identical grounds where they occurred." Gillson Willetts wrote the screenplay.

=== Edendale ===
Attracted by Southern California's mild, dry climate, varied geography for location shooting and isolation from Edison's legal representatives on the east coast, Selig set up his studio in Edendale in 1909 with director Francis Boggs, who began the facility in a rented bungalow and quickly expanded, designing the studio's front entrance after Mission San Gabriel.

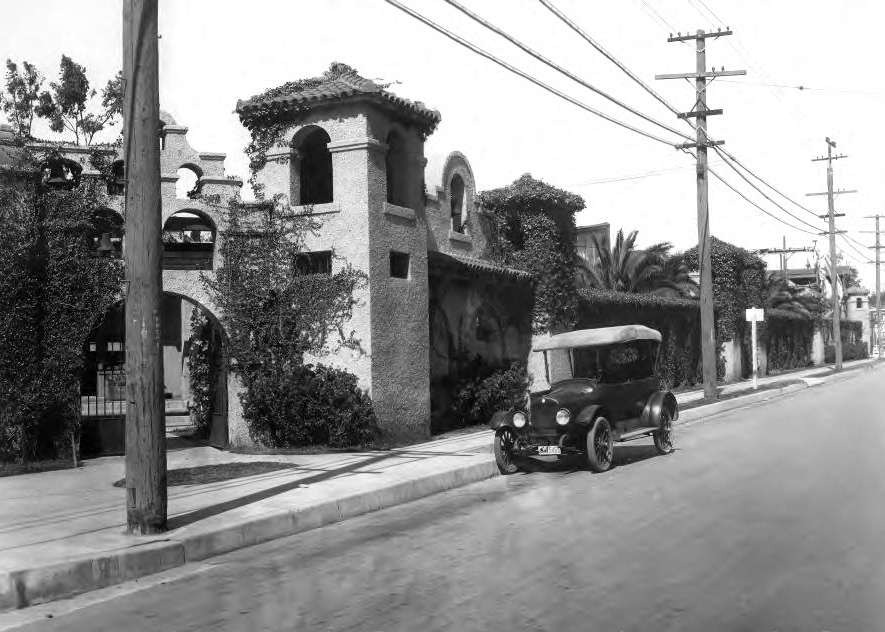
Street view of Selig's studio in Edendale, c. 1910

Between 1910 and 1913, when it released the film to audiences nationwide, Selig Polyscope filmed The Coming of Columbus. Described as "the sensation of the moving picture world" and "the most expensive, the most elaborate and most wonderful graphic moving picture film ever made," the three-reel movie portrayed "the vital events in the life and discoveries of Christopher Columbus" that were "with historic exactness." The film took three years to develop at a cost of more than $50,000.

An early production there was The Count of Monte Cristo. Edendale soon became Selig Polyscope's headquarters, but in 1911 Boggs was murdered by a Japanese gardener who also wounded Selig. The company produced hundreds of short features at Edendale, including many early westerns featuring Tom Mix (which were also shot at Las Vegas, New Mexico).

Selig Polyscope also made dozens of highly successful short movies involving wild animals in exotic settings, including a popular re-creation of an African safari hunt by Teddy Roosevelt. In 1914, Selig made fourteen short experimental "talking pictures" with Scottish actor Harry Lauder.

=== The "cliffhanger" ===
In 1913, through a collaborative partnership with the Chicago Tribune, Selig produced The Adventures of Kathlyn, introducing a dramatic serial plot device which came to be known as the cliffhanger. Each chapter's story was simultaneously published in the newspaper. A combination of wild animals, clever dramatic action and Kathlyn Williams' screen presence resulted in significant success. The Tribune’s circulation reportedly increased by ten percent and a dance and a cocktail were named after Williams, whose likeness was reportedly sold on more than 50,000 postcards.

=== Hearst-Selig News Pictorial ===
Hearst-Selig News Pictorial was established in 1914 by the Selig Polyscope Company and the Hearst Corporation. Hearst-Selig News Pictorial, No. 104 was released in U.S. theaters by the General Film Company on December 30, 1915. After this release, the partnership between Hearst and Selig broke up. Selig continued to produce newsreels in collaboration with the Chicago Tribune while Hearst made use of Vitagraph to produce the Hearst-Vitagraph News Pictorial series.

=== V-L-S-E, Incorporated ===
In 1915, Selig entered into an agreement with Vitagraph Studios, Lubin Manufacturing Company, and Essanay Studios to form a film distribution partnership known as V-L-S-E, Incorporated.

=== Selig Zoo ===
Selig created a zoo in east Los Angeles to serve as a home for the company's performing animals. The Selig Zoo was founded in about 1913 and persisted for several decades under a variety of names.

== Legacy ==
=== Academy library ===
In the late 1940s, Selig made a large donation of business records to the Academy of Motion Picture Arts and Sciences Library. The William Selig papers, together with the donation, include Selig's correspondence, scripts, scrapbooks, production files and six feet of photographs that include production stills from over 500 films that are otherwise lost (only about 225 of the over 3,500 films released by Selig between 1896 and 1938 have survived into the present day). This collection still requires further study.

=== Lost films ===
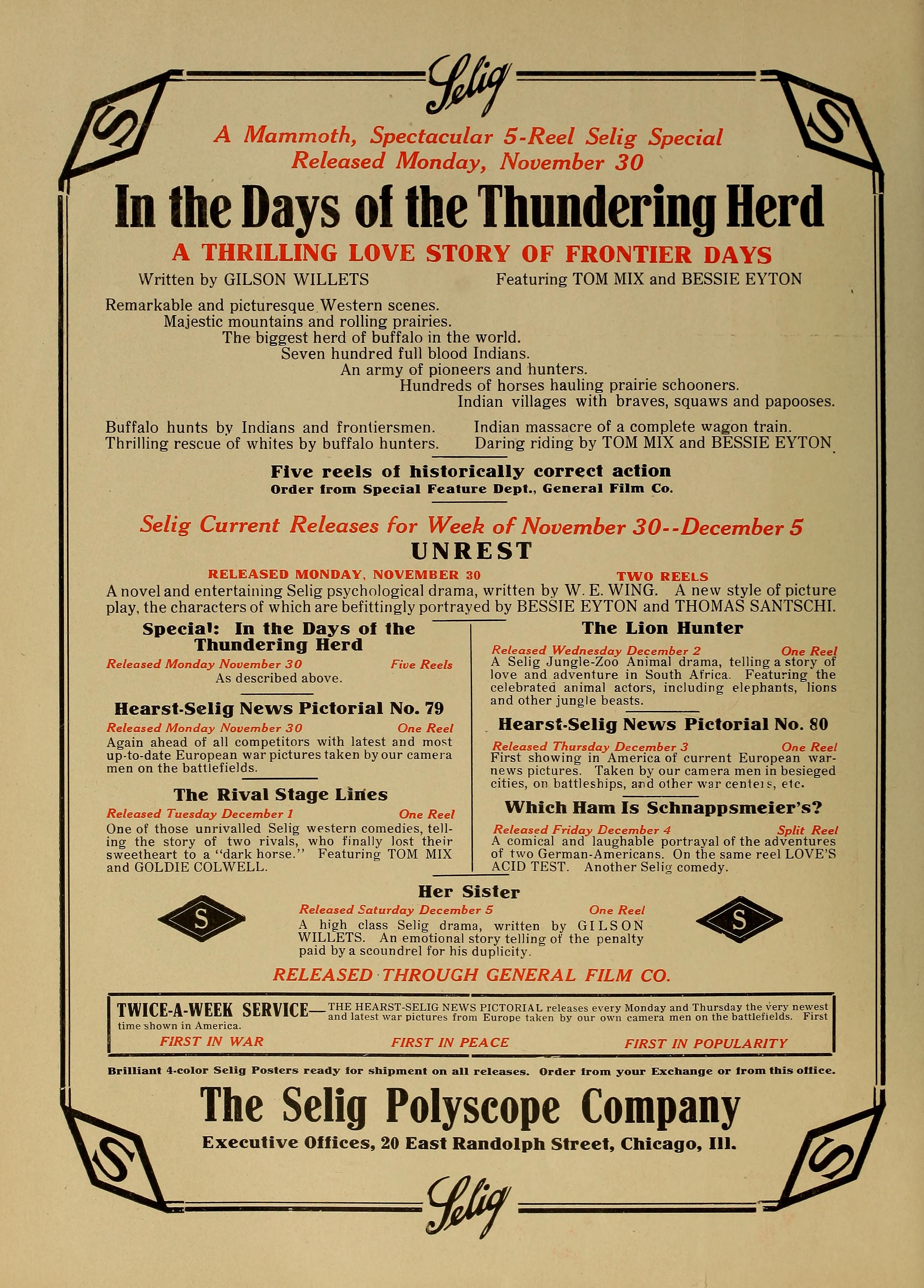
1914 Selig-Polyscope trade ad in Motography

The potential of movies as long term sources of revenue was unknown to early movie industry executives. Films were made quickly, sent into distribution channels and mostly forgotten soon after their first runs. Surviving prints were typically stored haphazardly, if at all. Nitrate film stock, in common use until the mid-20th Century, is chemically volatile and many prints were lost in fires or decomposed in storage. Some were recycled for their silver content or simply thrown away to save space. Out of Selig Polyscope's hundreds of films, only a few copies and scattered photographic elements are known to survive.

A few films and fragments are part of the Dawson Film Find including: Circumstantial Evidence (1912), Directed by Otis Thayer starring Marshall Steadman; and A New Woman and the Lion (1912), Directed by George Hernandez starring Nick Cooley. Clips of these are referenced and can be seen the documentary film Dawson City:Frozen in Time (2016).

== Partial filmography ==
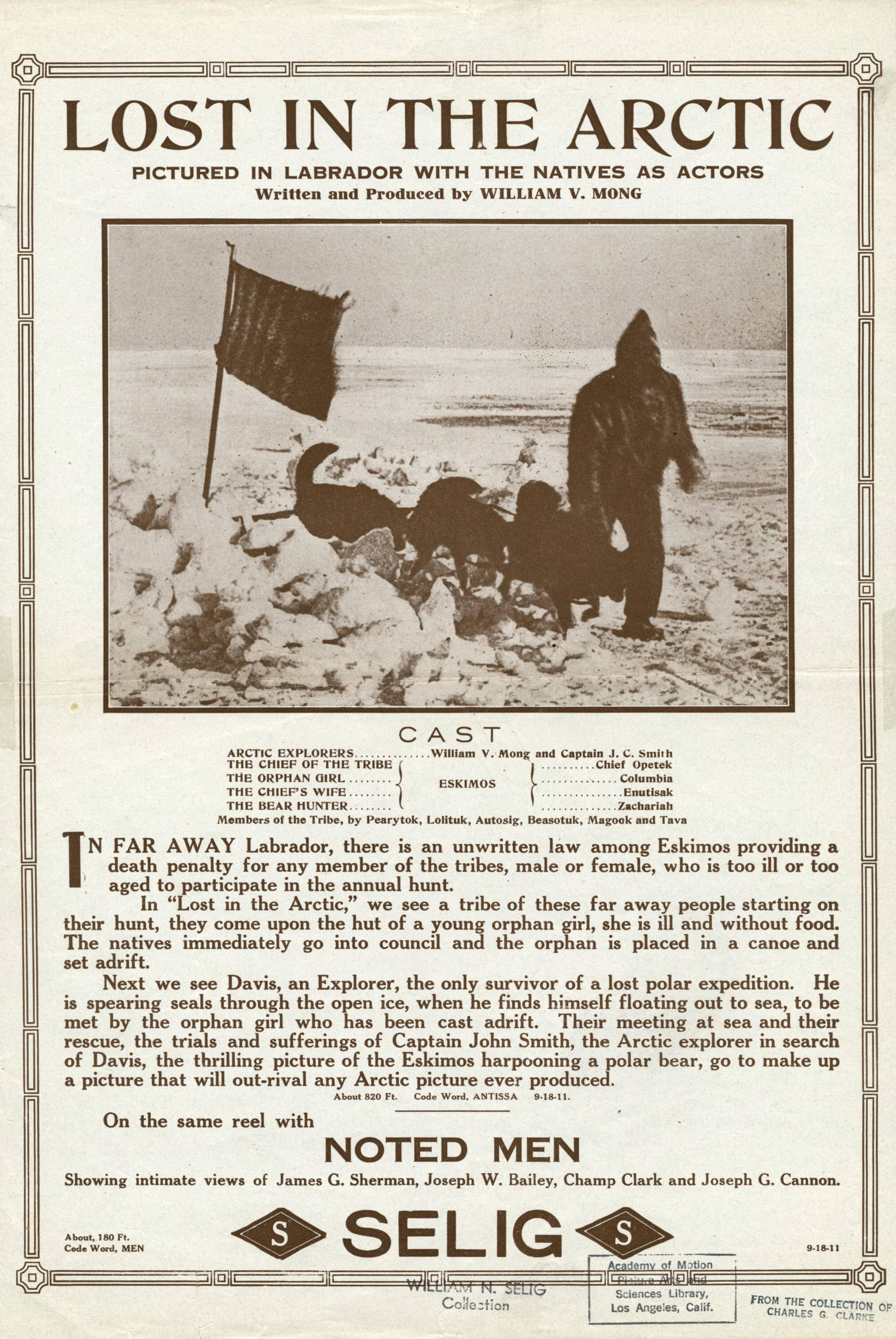
Flier for Lost in the Arctic, 1911

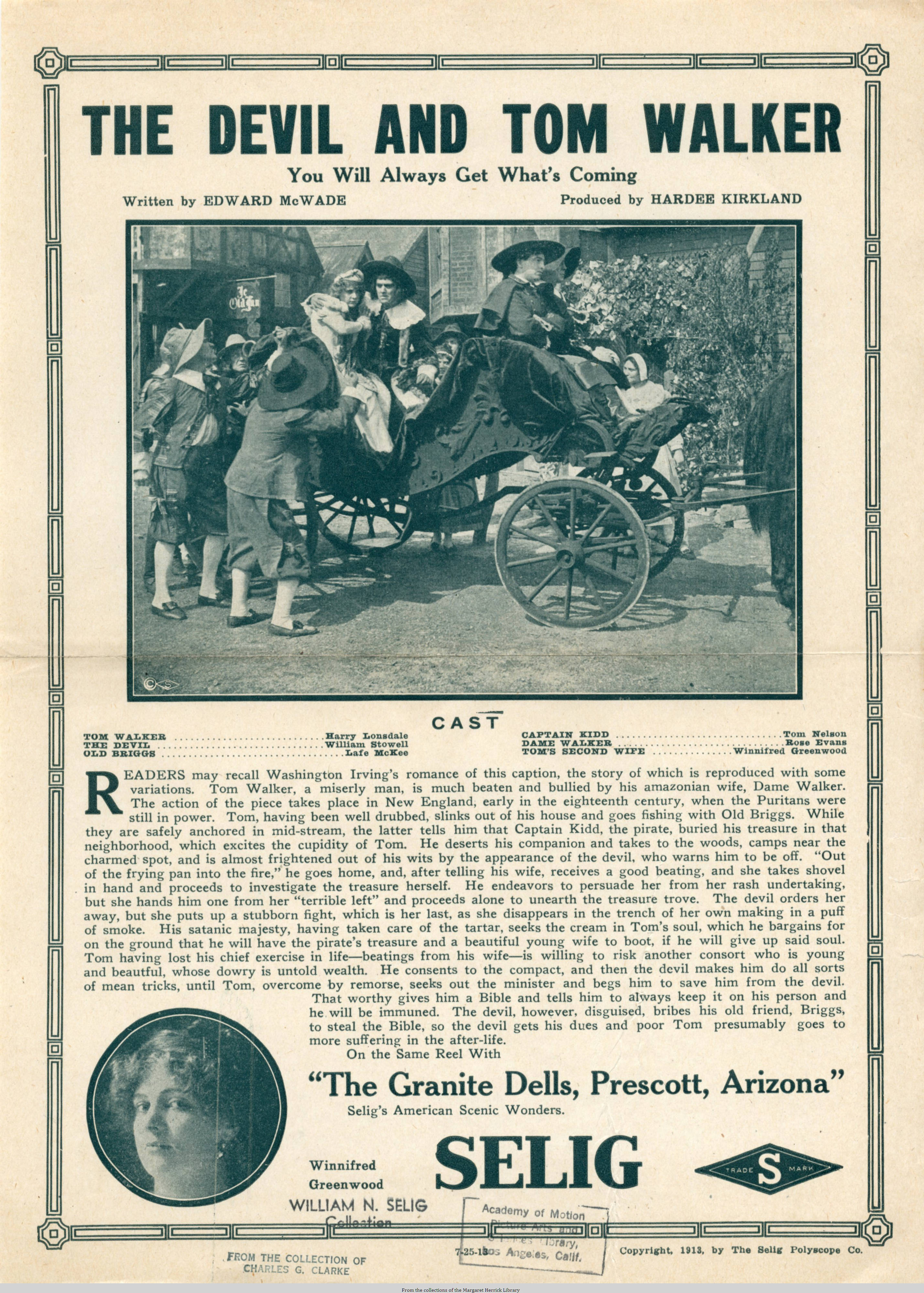
Flier for The Devil and Tom Walker, 1913

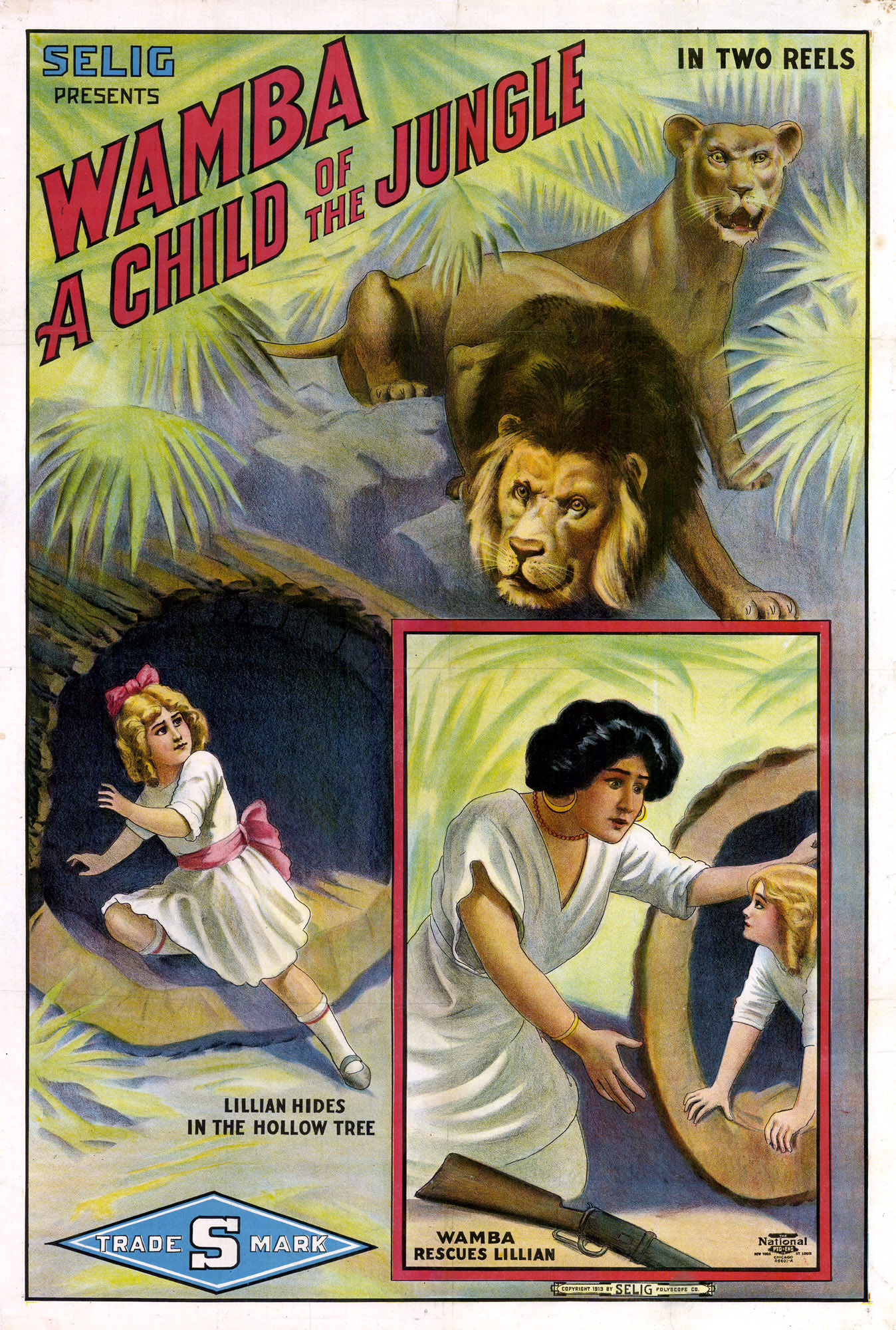
Poster for Wamba Child of The Jungle, 1913. Exotic animals were a staple of Selig Productions

- The Tramp and the Dog (1896)
- Soldiers at Play (1898)
- Something Good – Negro Kiss (1898)
- Chicago Police Parade (1901)
- Dewey Parade (1901)
- Gans-McGovern Fight (1901)
- Fun at the Glenwood Springs Pool (1902)
- A Hot Time on a Bathing Beach (1903)
- Business Rivalry (1903)
- Chicago Fire Run (1903)
- Chicago Firecats on Parade (1903)
- The Girl in Blue (1903)
- Trip Around The Union Loop (1903)
- View of State Street (1903)
- Tracked by Bloodhounds; or, A Lynching at Cripple Creek (1904) (survives)
- Humpty Dumptry (1904)
- The Tramp Dog (1904)
- The Hold-Up of the Leadville Stage (1904)
- The Grafter (1907)
- The Count of Monte Cristo (1908)
- Damon and Pythias (1908)
- The Fairylogue and Radio-Plays (1908)
- Briton and Boer (1909)
- Hunting Big Game in Africa (1909)
- The Wonderful Wizard of Oz (1910) (survives)
- The Sergeant (1910) (survives)
- The Way of the Eskimo (1911)
- The Sheriff of Tuolumne (1911)
- Lost in the Arctic (1911)
- Life on the Border (1911) (partial section survives)
- The Coming of Columbus (1911)
- Brotherhood of Man (1912)
- Kings of the Forest (1912)
- The Other Fellow (1912)
- War Time Romance (1912)
- The Adventures of Kathlyn (1913)
- Arabia, the Equine Detective (1913)
- The Devil and Tom Walker (1913)
- The Sheriff of Yavapai County (1913)
- Wamba A Child of the Jungle (1913)
- The Spoilers (1914) (survives)
- A Black Sheep (1915)
- House of a Thousand Candles (1915)
- The Man from Texas (1915)
- The Crisis (1916)
- The Garden of Allah (1916)
- The City of Purple Dreams (1918)
- Little Orphant Annie (1918)

== See also ==
- Universal City Zoo
