= Another Man's Shoes =

Another Man's Shoes may refer to:

- Another Man's Shoes (novel)
- Another Man's Shoes (film)
- List of One Day at a Time (1975 TV series) episodes#ep209
