= H. Tipton Steck =

American screenwriter (1888–1953)

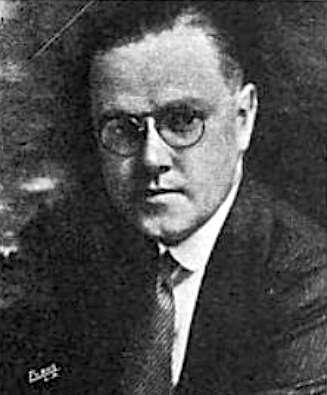
- Born: Harry Tipton Steck; October 24, 1888; Chicago, Illinois, U.S.
- Died: June 3, 1953 (aged 64); Bel Air, Los Angeles, California, U.S.
- Burial place: Forest Lawn Memorial Park, Glendale, California, U.S.
- Occupations: Screenwriter, scenario writer for film, advertising executive
- Spouse: Florence Eddye Bartlett (m. 1925–)

Harry "H." Tipton Steck (October 24, 1888 – June 3, 1953) was an American screenwriter, and scenario writer for silent film. He later worked as an advertising executive.

== Life and career ==
Steck started his career in 1915 as the manager of negative production, and 1918 in the scenario department with the Essanay Studios, a film production company in Chicago. He later worked for Thomas H. Ince at Universal Studios and Warner Bros. Studio. Steck was one of the screenwriters for the John Ford Stock Company.

He was married in 1925 to Florence Eddye Bartlett.

Steck died on June 3, 1953, in Bel Air, Los Angeles in California. He is buried at Forest Lawn Memorial Park in Glendale, California.

== Filmography ==
- The Accounting (1915), as writer, adapted from the novel The Accounting by Steck
- Graustark (1915), as writer; adapted from Graustark by George Barr McCutcheon
- The Old Sin (1915), as screenwriter
- Miss Freckles (1915), as scenario writer
- The Great Silence (1915), as writer
- Millstones (1916), as scenario writer
- The Phantom Buccaneer (1916), as writer; adapted from the novel Another Man's Shoes (1913) by Victor Bridges
- The Small Town Guy (1917), as writer with Freeman Tilden
- Gift O' Gab (1917), as writer
- The Man Who Was Afraid (1917), as screenwriter, adapted from the novel by Mary Brecht Pulver
- The Sea Flower (1918), as writer with George C. Hull
- Rider of the Law (1919), as screenwriter
- The Outcasts of Poker Flat (1919), as scenario writer
- The Last Outlaw (1919), as screenwriter
- Gun Law (1919), as screenwriter
- By Indian Post (1919), as screenwriter
- Marked Men (1919)
- The Broken Butterfly (1919), as writer with Charles E. Whittaker
- The Leopard Woman (1920), as screenwriter with Stanley C. Morse; adapted from the novel The Leopard Woman (1916) by Stewart Edward White
- Love (1920), as inter-titles writer
- The Sting of the Lash (1921), as writer with Harvey Gates
- Live and Let Live (1921), as writer
- Dangerous Pastime (1922), as writer with Wyndham Martin
- Woman's Law (1927), as writer
- Out of the Past (1927), as writer with John S. Lopez
- Outcast Souls (1928), as film editor, and titles

== Publications ==
- Steck, H. Tipton (September 23, 1920). "Well-Known Screen Experts Will Advise Ambitious Writers on Sale of Their Stories". Los Angeles Evening Express.
