= Through Fire and Water =

1923 film by Thomas Bentley

- Directed by: Thomas Bentley
- Written by: Eliot Stannard
- Based on: Greensea Island by Victor Bridges
- Starring: Clive Brook; Flora le Breton; Lawford Davidson; Jerrold Robertshaw
- Production company: Ideal Film Company
- Distributed by: Ideal Film Company
- Release date: February 1923
- Country: United Kingdom
- Language: English

Through Fire and Water is a 1923 British silent adventure film directed by Thomas Bentley and starring Clive Brook, Flora le Breton and Lawford Davidson. It was based on the 1922 novel Greensea Island by Victor Bridges.

== Cast ==
- Clive Brook as John Dryden
- Flora le Breton as Christine de Rhoda
- Lawford Davidson as Dr. Manning
- Jerrold Robertshaw as Jennaway
- M. A. Wetherell as Craill
- Teddy Arundell as Bascomb
- Esme Hubbard as Mrs. Craill
- Ian Wilson as Jimmy
