= Greensea Island =

1922 novel

- First Edition (US)
- Author: Victor Bridges
- Language: English
- Genre: Romance
- Publisher: Mills & Boon (UK); Putnam's (US)
- Publication date: 1922
- Publication place: United Kingdom
- Media type: Print

Greensea Island is a 1922 adventure novel by the British writer Victor Bridges. It was his final novel for publishers Mills & Boon as he was signed up by Hodder & Stoughton who hoped he could replicate the success of Edgar Wallace's thrillers.

== Adaptation ==
In 1923 it was made into a silent film Through Fire and Water produced by the British studio Ideal Films. Directed by Thomas Bentley it starred Clive Brook, Flora le Breton and Lawford Davidson.

== Bibliography ==
- Goble, Alan. The Complete Index to Literary Sources in Film. Walter de Gruyter, 1999.
- McAleer, Joseph. Passion's Fortune: The Story of Mills & Boon. OUP Oxford, 1999.
- Reilly, John M. Twentieth Century Crime & Mystery Writers. Springer, 2015.
