= The Lady from Long Acre =

1918 novel

- 1932 Hodder & Stoughton paperback edition
- Author: Victor Bridges
- Language: English
- Genre: Romance
- Publisher: Mills & Boon (UK); Putnam's (US)
- Publication date: 1918
- Publication place: United Kingdom
- Media type: Print

The Lady from Long Acre is a 1918 romance novel by the British writer Victor Bridges. It was published in the United States the following year.

== Adaptations ==
In 1921 it was adapted into an American silent film The Lady from Longacre directed by George Marshall and starring William Russell and Mary Thurman. It was remade as a 1925 film Greater Than a Crown directed by Roy William Neill and starring Edmund Lowe and Dolores Costello. Both versions were produced by Fox Film.

== Bibliography ==
- Goble, Alan. The Complete Index to Literary Sources in Film. Walter de Gruyter, 1999.
- Reilly, John M. Twentieth Century Crime & Mystery Writers. Springer, 2015.
- Wlaschin, Ken. Silent Mystery and Detective Movies: A Comprehensive Filmography. McFarland, 2009.
