= The Phantom Buccaneer =

1916 film

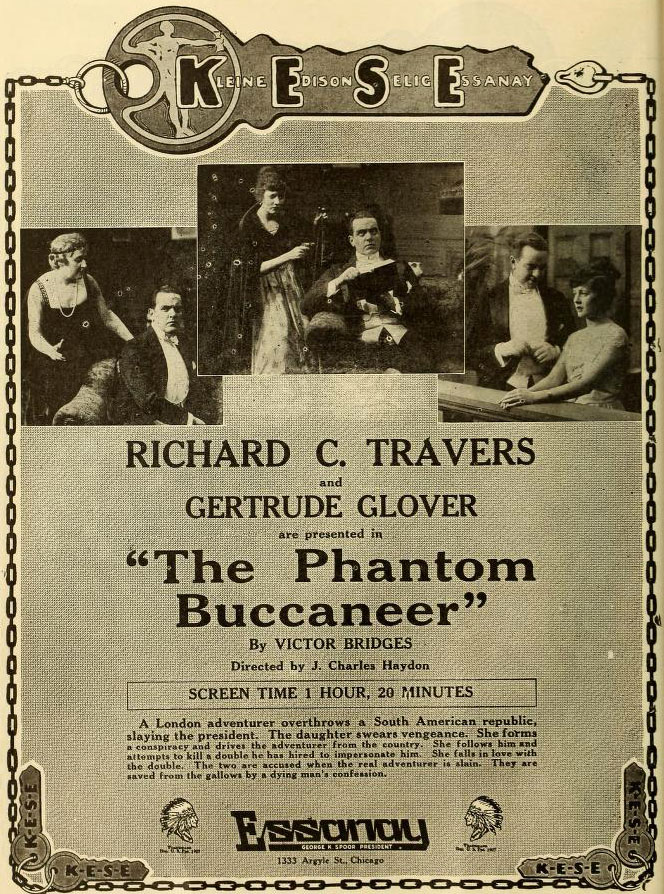
- Directed by: J. Charles Haydon
- Written by: H. Tipton Steck
- Based on: Another Man's Shoes by Victor Bridges
- Starring: Richard Travers; Gertrude Glover; Thurlow Brewer
- Production company: Essanay Film Manufacturing Company
- Distributed by: K-E-S-E Service
- Release date: December 18, 1916
- Running time: 80 minutes
- Country: United States
- Languages: Silent; English intertitles

The Phantom Buccaneer is a 1916 American silent drama film directed by J. Charles Haydon and starring Richard Travers, Gertrude Glover and Thurlow Brewer. It is based in the 1913 novel Another Man's Shoes by British writer Victor Bridges.

== Cast ==
- Richard Travers as Stuart Northcote / Jack Burton
- Gertrude Glover as Mercia Solano
- Thurlow Brewer as Billy Logan
- Robert P. Thompson as Maurice Furnival
- James C. Carroll as Lord Sangatte
- Arthur W. Bates as Milford
- Ethel Davis as Lady Barradell

== Bibliography ==
- Connelly, Robert B. The Silents: Silent Feature Films, 1910-36, Volume 40, Issue 2. December Press, 1998.
