= The Romance of an American Duchess =

1915 film

- Produced by: Essanay Studios
- Starring: Richard C. Travers
- Distributed by: General Film Company
- Release date: June 8, 1915
- Running time: 2 reels
- Country: United States
- Language: Silent with English intertitles

The Romance of an American Duchess is a 1915 American short silent drama film starring Richard C. Travers. Gloria Swanson had an uncredited role.

== Cast ==
- Richard C. Travers as Duke de Longtour
- Estelle Scott as Countess Maria
- Sidney Ainsworth as Marquis Ferdinand
- Ruth Stonehouse as Stephana Martin
- Gloria Swanson as Minor Role (uncredited)
