= Another Man's Shoes (film) =

1922 film by Jack Conway

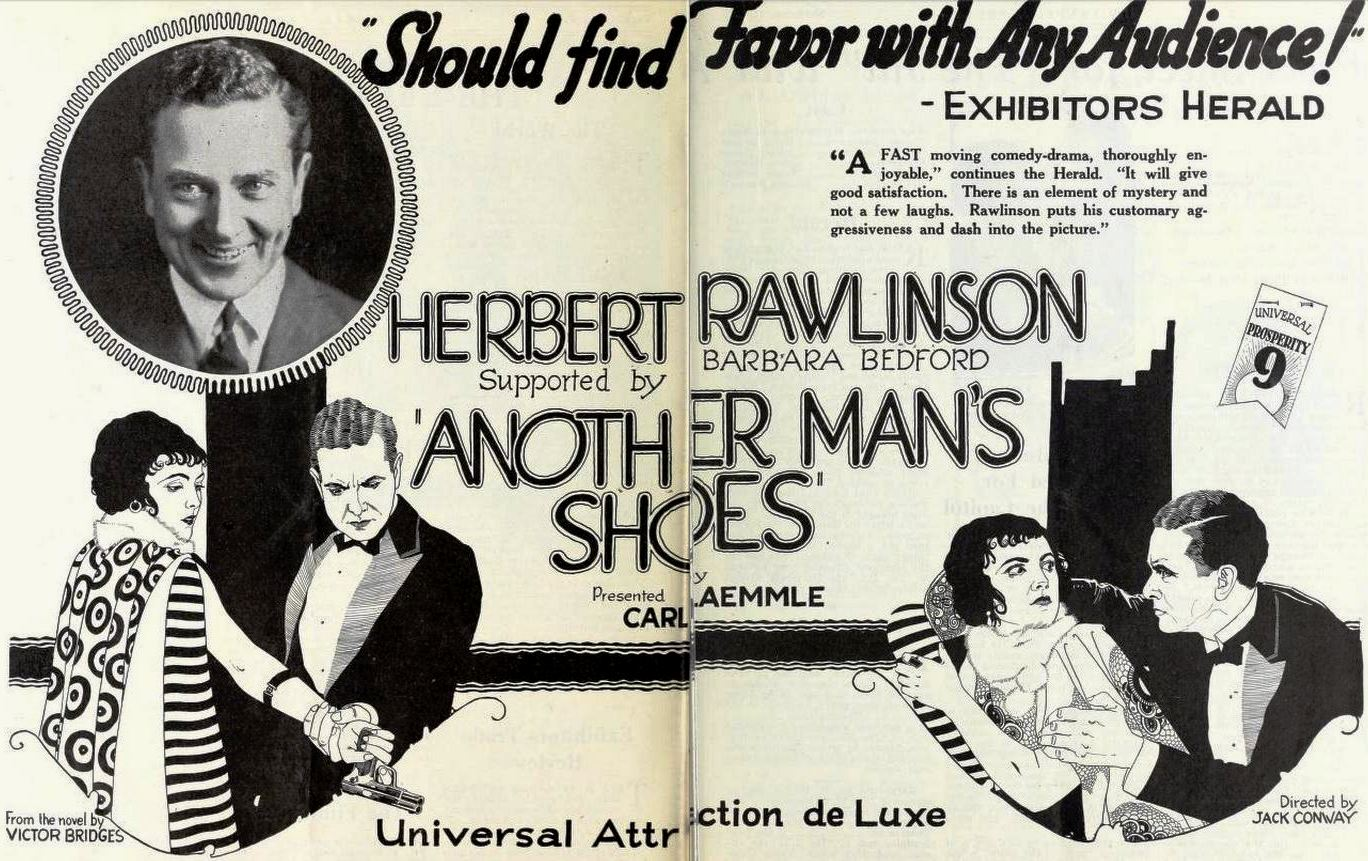
- Advertisement
- Directed by: Jack Conway
- Screenplay by: Victor Bridges; Raymond L. Schrock; Arthur F. Statter
- Based on: Another Man's Shoes by Victor Bridges
- Starring: Herbert Rawlinson; Barbara Bedford; Una Trevelyn; Nick De Ruiz; Josef Swickard; Jean De Briac
- Cinematography: Ben F. Reynolds
- Production company: Universal Film Manufacturing Company
- Distributed by: Universal Film Manufacturing Company
- Release date: November 6, 1922
- Running time: 50 minutes
- Country: United States
- Language: Silent (English intertitles)

Another Man's Shoes is a 1922 American silent comedy film directed by Jack Conway and written by Victor Bridges, Raymond L. Schrock, and Arthur F. Statter. It is based on the 1913 novel Another Man's Shoes by Victor Bridges. The film stars Herbert Rawlinson, Barbara Bedford, Una Trevelyn, Nick De Ruiz, Josef Swickard, and Jean De Briac. The film was released on November 6, 1922, by Universal Film Manufacturing Company.

== Cast ==
- Herbert Rawlinson as Stuart Granger / Jack Burton
- Barbara Bedford as Mercia Solano
- Una Trevelyn as Grace Burton
- Nick De Ruiz as Ropal
- Josef Swickard as Gouret
- Jean De Briac as John Alvara
- Harry Carter as Lawrence
- Nelson McDowell as Milford
- Lillian Langdon as Mrs. Chetwell
- Jessie Deparnette as Duenna

== Preservation ==
With no holdings located in archives, Another Man's Shoes is considered a lost film.
