= Greater Than a Crown =

1925 film

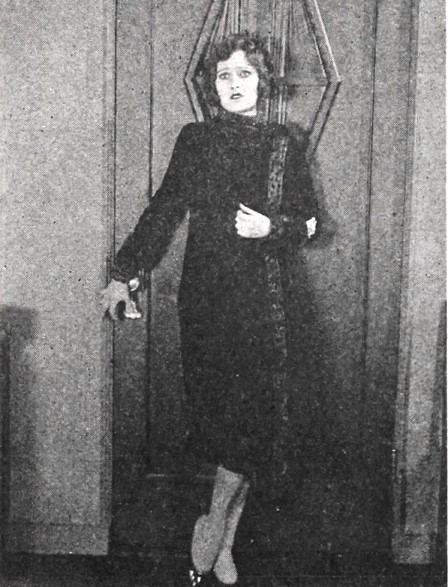
- Film still
- Directed by: Roy William Neill
- Written by: Wyndham Gittens
- Based on: The Lady from Long Acre by Victor Bridges
- Produced by: William Fox
- Starring: Edmund Lowe; Dolores Costello; Margaret Livingston
- Cinematography: Joseph H. August
- Production company: Fox Film
- Distributed by: Fox Film
- Release date: July 12, 1925
- Running time: 1 hour
- Country: United States
- Language: Silent (English intertitles)

Greater Than a Crown is a 1925 American silent romantic comedy film directed by Roy William Neill and starring Edmund Lowe, Dolores Costello, and Margaret Livingston. It was based on a 1918 novel The Lady from Long Acre by the British writer Victor Bridges. The novel had previously been adapted as the 1921 film The Lady from Longacre.

== Plot ==
An American man in London assists an escaped Princess who has fled to England to escape a royal marriage. After she is kidnapped and taken home, he goes to rescue her with the assistance of his English actress friend.

== Cast ==
- Edmund Lowe as Tom Conway
- Dolores Costello as Isabel Frances/Princess of Lividia
- Margaret Livingston as Molly Montrose
- Ben Hendricks Jr. as Tiger Bugg (credited as Ben Hendricks)
- Paul Panzer as Marquis Ferasti
- Tony Merlo as King Danilo (credited as Anthony Merlo)
- Robert Klein as Count Seda
- Dorothy Seay

== Preservation ==
A print of Greater Than a Crown is preserved in a foreign film archive.

== Bibliography ==
- Solomon, Aubrey. The Fox Film Corporation, 1915-1935: A History and Filmography. McFarland, 2011.
