= The Lady from Longacre =

1921 film

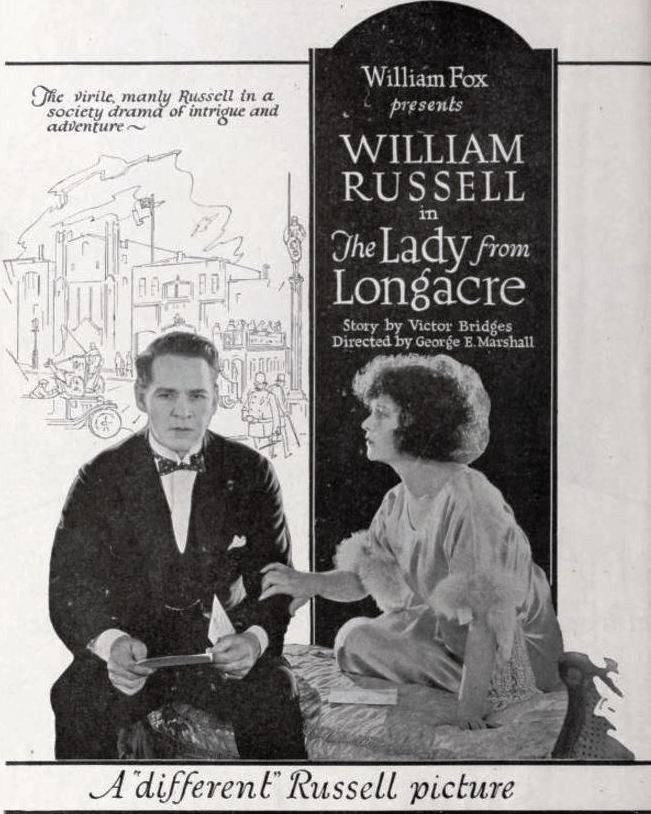
- Directed by: George Marshall
- Written by: Paul Schofield
- Based on: The Lady from Long Acre by Victor Bridges
- Produced by: William Fox
- Starring: William Russell; Mary Thurman; Mathilde Brundage
- Cinematography: Benjamin H. Kline
- Production company: Fox Film Corporation
- Distributed by: Fox Film Corporation
- Release date: October 2, 1921
- Running time: 50 minutes
- Country: United States
- Languages: Silent; English intertitles

The Lady from Longacre is a lost 1921 American silent drama film directed by George Marshall and starring William Russell, Mary Thurman and Mathilde Brundage. It is based on the 1918 novel The Lady from Long Acre by Victor Bridges, later remade as the 1925 film Greater Than a Crown.

== Plot ==
Hoping to escape an arranged marriage Princess Isabel escapes to England where she falls in love with Lord Anthony Conway.

== Cast ==
- William Russell as Lord Anthony Conway
- Mary Thurman as Princess Isabel/Molly Moncke
- Mathilde Brundage as Lady Jocelyn
- Robert Klein as Count de Se
- Jean De Briac as Ex-King Pedro
- Francis Ford as Count de Freitas
- William Brunton as Tiger Bugg
- Douglas Gerrard as Sir Henry
- Lillian Worth as Lady Laura
- Arthur Van Sickle as Spaulding
- Louis Dumar as Count Cognasto

== Bibliography ==
- Connelly, Robert B. The Silents: Silent Feature Films, 1910-36, Volume 40, Issue 2. December Press, 1998.
- Munden, Kenneth White. The American Film Institute Catalog of Motion Pictures Produced in the United States, Part 1. University of California Press, 1997.
- Solomon, Aubrey. The Fox Film Corporation, 1915-1935: A History and Filmography. McFarland, 2011.
