= One Day at a Time (1975 TV series) =

American television sitcom (1975–1984)

- Genre: Sitcom
- Created by: Whitney Blake; Allan Manings
- Developed by: Norman Lear
- Directed by: Herbert Kenwith (seasons 2–3); Alan Rafkin (seasons 3–8); Various (seasons 1 & 8–9)
- Starring: Bonnie Franklin; Mackenzie Phillips; Richard Masur; Valerie Bertinelli; Pat Harrington Jr.; Mary Louise Wilson; Michael Lembeck; Ron Rifkin; Glenn Scarpelli; Shelley Fabares; Boyd Gaines; Howard Hesseman; Nanette Fabray
- Theme music composer: Jeff Barry; Nancy Barry
- Opening theme: "This Is It" performed by Polly Cutter
- Ending theme: "This Is It" (instrumental)
- Composer: Ray Barry
- Country of origin: United States
- Original language: English
- No. of seasons: 9
- No. of episodes: 209 (list of episodes)

Production
- Executive producers: Dick Bensfield; Jack Elinson; Perry Grant; Mort Lachman; Norman Lear; Alan Rafkin
- Producers: Dick Bensfield; Patricia Fass Palmer; Perry Grant; Katherine Green; Allan Manings; Bud Wiser
- Camera setup: Multi-camera setup, videotape
- Running time: 24 minutes
- Production companies: T.A.T. Communications Company (seasons 1–7); Embassy Television (seasons 8–9)

Original release
- Network: CBS
- Release: December 16, 1975 – May 28, 1984

Related
- One Day at a Time (2017–2020)

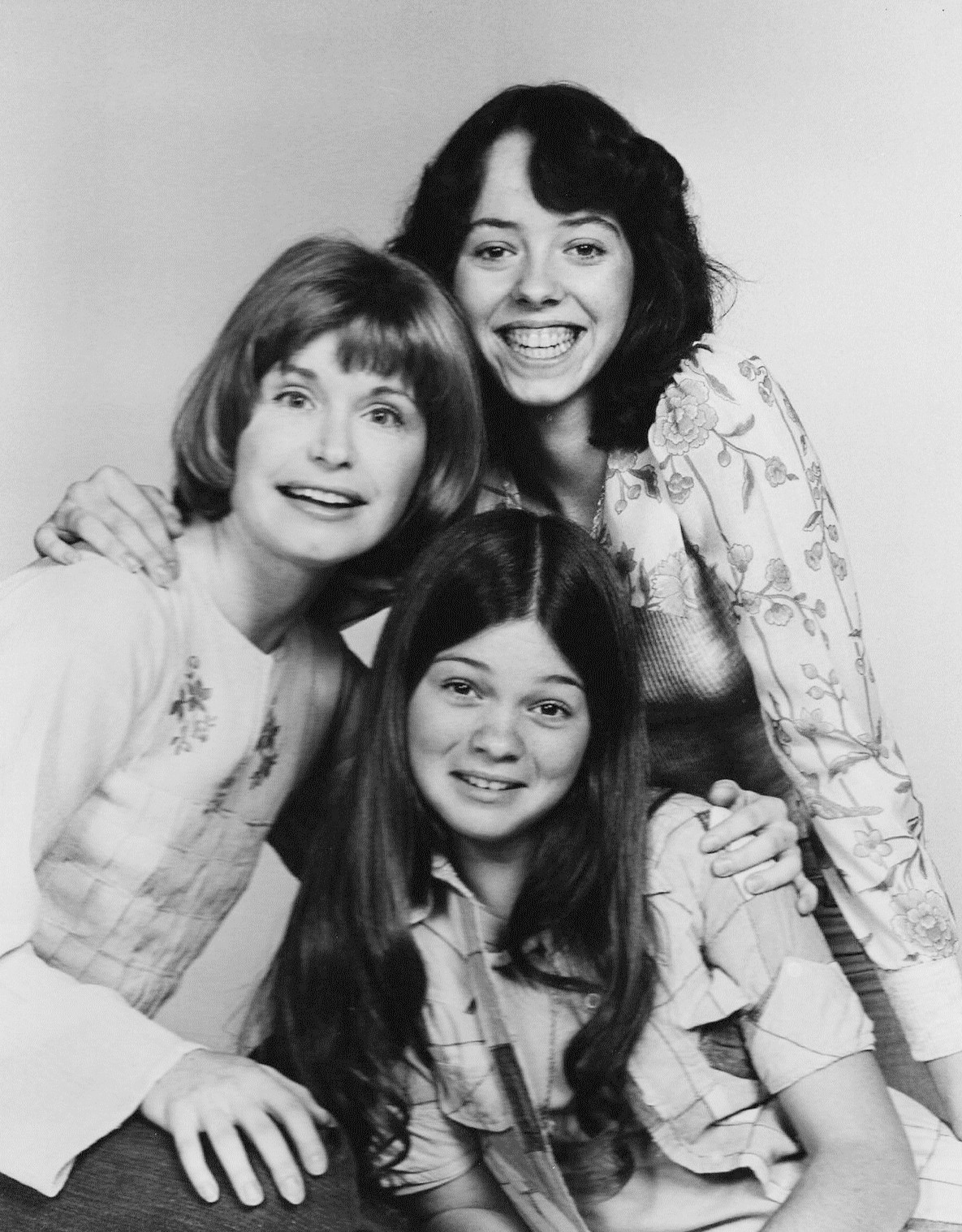
Bonnie Franklin, Mackenzie Phillips, and Valerie Bertinelli

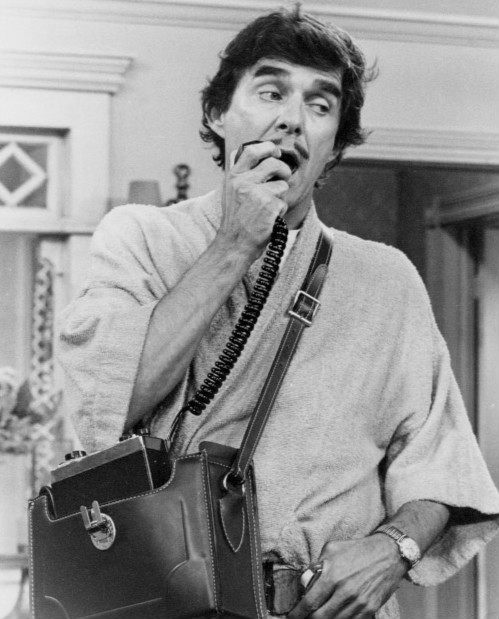
Pat Harrington Jr. (1976)

One Day at a Time is an American television sitcom that aired on CBS from December 16, 1975, to May 28, 1984. It stars Bonnie Franklin as a divorced mother raising two teenage daughters, played by Mackenzie Phillips and Valerie Bertinelli, and is set in Indianapolis.

== Background ==
The series was created by Whitney Blake and Allan Manings, a husband-and-wife writing duo who had both been actors in the 1950s and 1960s. The series was based on Whitney Blake's own life as a single mother raising her three children (including future actress Meredith Baxter) after her divorce from her first husband.

== Overview ==
Divorced mother Ann Romano (Bonnie Franklin) moves herself and her teenage daughters, rebellious Julie (Mackenzie Phillips) and wisecracking Barbara (Valerie Bertinelli), from their home in Logansport, Indiana, to Indianapolis. Ann frequently struggles with maintaining her role as mother while affording her daughters the freedom she never had as a young woman. Dwayne Schneider (Pat Harrington Jr.), the building superintendent, provides usually unwanted advice to the tenants, especially Ann.

Ann dates her divorce lawyer, David Kane (Richard Masur). They become engaged. On their wedding day David says he wants kids, while Ann does not; as such, they call off the wedding.

After David takes a job in Los Angeles, the show focuses on Ann's dilemmas as a single mother and career woman and the girls' growing pains, with Schneider becoming a more welcome part of the family. Ginny Wroblicki (Mary Louise Wilson) moves into the apartment building for a year, and Ann's strained relationship with her ex-husband Ed slowly improves, as does the girls' relationship with his new wife Vickie. Julie and Barbara graduate from high school and head into the working world. Julie eventually marries flight attendant Max Horvath (Michael Lembeck).

Alex (Glenn Scarpelli), the orphaned son of Ann's deceased boyfriend Nick (Ron Rifkin), moves in, changing the dynamics in the female-dominated apartment. Ann starts her own advertising business with her once-workplace-rival Francene Webster (Shelley Fabares). Later in the series' run, Julie gives birth to daughter "Little Annie" Horvath (Lauren and Paige Maloney), Barbara marries dental student Mark Royer (Boyd Gaines), and Ann's mother Katherine (Nanette Fabray) moves nearby. Ann later marries Mark Royer's father, Sam (Howard Hesseman).

In the penultimate episode, Ann decides to take a job in London, leaving her daughters in Indianapolis raising their own families. In the series finale, Schneider leaves town, moving to Florida to take care of his niece and nephew.

== Production ==
There were two pilots for the series. The first was filmed in 1975 under the series original working title "Three to Get Ready". Two major differences are that Ann worked as a nurse and had only one daughter in the first pilot. After a major re-working the second filmed pilot became the one that launched the show.

For its entire run, the series was taped in Hollywood before a studio audience. Originally, it was taped at CBS Television City for its first four episodes. Shortly after its premiere, the series began taping at Metromedia Square, where it remained until 1982. From 1982 to 1984, the series was recorded at Universal Studios.

Like many sitcoms developed by Norman Lear, One Day at a Time often tackled serious issues in life and relationships, particularly those related to second-wave feminism, and can be considered an example of the "dramedy" (hybrid comedy/drama) genre. In an ironic twist, during the 1979–1980 season, Mackenzie Phillips was dealing with drug addiction and entered rehab in 1980, reflecting the Alcoholics Anonymous central sobriety saying, "One Day at a Time." Stories depicting such events as weddings, births, and other important milestones frequently stretched over two-, three-, and four-part episodes.

=== Theme song and opening credits ===
The theme song for One Day at a Time, "This Is It", was composed by Brill Building songwriter Jeff Barry and his wife Nancy Barry, and performed by recording artist Polly Cutter. The opening credits were originally seen over a filmed sequence showing Ann, Julie, and Barbara excitedly moving into their new home. Later, the opening credits sequence mostly consisted of clips of each cast member taken from previous episodes.

=== Casting ===
Actors Bonnie Franklin, Pat Harrington Jr., and Valerie Bertinelli were the only cast members to remain with the series throughout its entire run. Lead actress Mackenzie Phillips was fired after the fifth season due to growing problems with substance abuse. She later returned in a frequent recurring role, but was let go again shortly after the start of the final season. Original cast member Richard Masur was written out early in the second season, but returned as a guest star in the sixth-season finale.

Richard Masur played attorney David Kane, a love interest for the newly divorced Ann Romano, in the first season and left after the fourth episode of the second season. In a 2016 interview with The A.V. Club, he explained that David was constantly proposing marriage to Ann and she refused him every time. The actor became even further frustrated when Lear insisted that David and Ann's romance be unconsummated. His role was relegated to being a confidante to Julie and Barbara and an adversary to Schneider. After several disagreements with the direction Masur's character took, Lear agreed to write off David from the show but not entirely, per his appearance in the finale.

After Masur's departure, the producers replaced the romantic interest with a comedic foil. That role was filled by actress and comedienne Mary Louise Wilson, playing as Ginny Wroblicki, a cocktail waitress who becomes Ann's neighbor, best friend, and confidante. It was an unhappy casting change all around, as the show's ratings began to decline soon after Wilson's arrival; the character of Ginny Wroblicki proved to be unpopular with viewers, and Wilson herself did not like the role or get along with Franklin.

Wilson wrote that "aside from Lear, nobody thought I was funny...To make matters worse, each character, according to the show's formula, had to have a 'serious' moral dilemma at some point, and I was given some problem about an illegitimate child to work out in these increasingly sentimental scenes that made my bowels shrink." At the end of the second season of One Day at a Time, Wilson was released from the show at her own request after appearing in 14 episodes. The character of Ginny Wroblicki was never seen, referred to, or heard from again except in a fifth-season retrospective clip episode.

For the next two seasons, the central cast of Ann, Julie, Barbara, and Schneider was supplemented by recurring characters, including William Kirby Cullen as Julie's boyfriend Chuck Butterfield, Howard Morton and K Callan as Chuck's parents, John Putch as Barbara's awkward friend Bob Morton, Scott Colomby as Barbara's boyfriend Cliff Randall, and John Hillerman and Charles Siebert as Ann's bosses, Mr. Connors and Mr. Davenport, respectively. Dick O'Neill and Nedra Volz made three appearances together as Orville and Emily, residents of the retirement home where the main characters put on a semiregular variety show. Joseph Campanella also made several appearances as Ann's ex-husband and the girls' father, Ed Cooper.

Michael Lembeck joined the series as Julie's husband, Max, in the fifth season, but he was written out as a consequence of Phillips' firing, but later returned in season seven along with Philips. A steady stream of regulars was added in the ensuing seasons, including Ron Rifkin as Ann's boyfriend, Nick; Glenn Scarpelli as Nick's son, Alex; and Boyd Gaines as Barbara's boyfriend, later husband, Mark. The character of Nick lasted only one season, being killed off in a car crash, but Nick's son Alex stayed with the family for the following two years.

Shelley Fabares, who had previously guest-starred as Ann's rival co-worker Francine Webster, appeared more frequently, eventually becoming a regular. Nanette Fabray, (Note: Nanette Fabray was the real life aunt of Shelley Fabares.) who played Ann's mother, also made more frequent appearances before becoming a regular cast member in the final season. Howard Hesseman joined the series for a short time as Mark's father, Sam, who would become Ann's second husband.

The character of Julie was written out again in the ninth season, as Mackenzie Phillips' erratic behavior and drug-related issues recurred. She was dropped from the opening credits and not present after the fourth episode of season 9, although for a time she was still referred to as an off-screen character, while Michael Lembeck was still seen regularly as Julie's husband, Max. Their daughter Annie was also seen. A few episodes later, Julie—still unseen—left Max, writing him a "Dear John" letter. The character of Max stuck with the show, but Julie was not seen again.

Notable guest stars throughout the series run include Norman Alden, Robby Benson, Carla Borelli, Charlie Brill, Dennis Burkley, Jack Dodson, Elinor Donahue, Gwyda Donhowe, David Dukes, Greg Evigan, Conchata Ferrell, Corey Feldman, Alice Ghostley, Lee Grant, Mark Hamill, Jim Hutton, Van Johnson, Terry Kiser, Richard Kline, Christopher Knight, Jay Leno, Robert Mandan, Robert Morse, Denise Nicholas, J. Pat O'Malley, Jo Ann Pflug, Eve Plumb, Susan Richardson, William Schallert, Gretchen Corbett, Suzanne Somers, Ellen Travolta, Dick Van Patten, and Keenan Wynn.

==== Main cast ====
= Main cast (credited)
= Recurring cast (3+)
= Guest cast (1–2)

Actor	Character	Seasons								
Actor	Character	1	2	3	4	5	6	7	8	9
Bonnie Franklin	Ann Romano-Royer	Main	Main	Main	Main	Main	Main	Main	Main	Main
Mackenzie Phillips	Julie Cooper Horvath	Main	Main	Main	Main	Main		Recurring	Main	Main
Richard Masur	David Kane	Main	Main				Guest			
Valerie Bertinelli	Barbara Cooper Royer	Main	Main	Main	Main	Main	Main	Main	Main	Main
Pat Harrington Jr.	Dwayne F. Schneider	Main	Main	Main	Main	Main	Main	Main	Main	Main
Mary Louise Wilson	Ginny Wroblicki		Main							
Michael Lembeck	Max Horvath					Main		Recurring	Main	Main
Ron Rifkin	Nick Handris						Main			
Glenn Scarpelli	Alex Handris						Main	Main	Main	
Shelley Fabares	Francine Webster			Guest	Guest		Guest	Recurring	Main	Also Starring
Boyd Gaines	Mark Royer							Recurring	Main	Main
Howard Hesseman	Sam Royer								Recurring	Main
Nanette Fabray	Katherine Romano				Guest	Recurring	Recurring	Recurring	Recurring	Main

== Episodes ==
Season	Episodes	Originally released		Rank	Rating
Season	Episodes	First released	Last released	Rank	Rating
1	15	December 16, 1975	March 30, 1976	12	23.1
2	24	September 28, 1976	March 22, 1977	8	23.4 (Note: Tied with The ABC Sunday Night Movie and Baretta)
3	24	September 27, 1977	April 3, 1978	10	23.0
4	26	September 18, 1978	April 14, 1979	18	21.6
5	26	September 30, 1979	April 13, 1980	10	23.0
6	21	November 9, 1980	May 10, 1981	11	22.0
7	25	October 11, 1981	May 16, 1982	10	22.0
8	26	September 26, 1982	May 23, 1983	16	19.1
9	22	October 2, 1983	May 28, 1984	44	15.9

== Reception ==
=== Ratings ===
One Day at a Time was best known in the early 1980s as a staple of the CBS Sunday-night lineup, one of the most successful in TV history, along with Archie Bunker's Place, Alice, and The Jeffersons.

The series consistently ranked among the top twenty, if not the top ten, programs in the ratings. However, the network moved the show around on the prime time schedule eleven times. By the end of the 1982–83 season, viewership was beginning to slip and the series ended season eight ranking at No. 16. At this time, Bonnie Franklin and Valerie Bertinelli were anxious to move on, but agreed to do a ninth and final season.

=== Awards and honors ===
- 1980: Golden Globe for Best Supporting Actor in a Television Series to Pat Harrington
- 1981, 1982: Golden Globe Award for Best Supporting Actress – Series, Miniseries or Television Film to Valerie Bertinelli
- 1982: Primetime Emmy Award for Outstanding Directing in a Comedy Series to Alan Rafkin
- 1984: Primetime Emmy Award for Outstanding Supporting Actor – Comedy Series to Pat Harrington

== Syndication ==
CBS aired daytime reruns of the show for three years. From September 17, 1979, to February 1, 1980, it aired on the daytime schedule at 3:30 pm Eastern time; with the cancellation of Love of Life to accommodate the expansion of The Young and the Restless to one hour, it was moved on February 4, 1980, to 4 pm Eastern, with Guiding Light moving to 3 pm. On September 28, 1981, it moved to 10 am Eastern time, and on September 20, 1982, it was replaced by The $25,000 Pyramid.

Soon after, the show entered off-network syndication, airing on local stations around the country, and nationally on WGN (currently known as NewsNation), TBS, and the E! Network.

Logo TV started airing episodes in April 2017 until it was removed in 2021.

As of July 23, 2017, the series aired weekday evenings, formerly Sunday nights, on the digital broadcast network Antenna TV. In 2019, the show was also seen on the cable network FETV until it was removed a few years later. The series returned to Antenna on January 4, 2021, until it was removed on December 31, 2023. The show made its return to Antenna again on January 1, 2026, airing weeknights at 8 pm Eastern and Saturdays at 4 pm Eastern time.

As of 2020, it can be seen weekday evenings on Hamilton, Ontario-based CHCH. It is available to stream for free with ads on the CTV app.

Pluto TV airs the show on channel 506. All in the Family also airs on this channel.

As of 2022, Canada's CTV Television Network's streaming service's "throwback" line-up features the entire run of the series.

== Cast reunions ==
The One Day at a Time Reunion was a 60-minute CBS retrospective special which aired on Tuesday February 22, 2005, at 9:00 pm ET, reuniting Bonnie Franklin, Mackenzie Phillips, Valerie Bertinelli, and Pat Harrington to reminisce about the series and their characters. Regular cast members Richard Masur, Shelley Fabares, Nanette Fabray, Michael Lembeck and Glenn Scarpelli shared their feelings about their time on the show in separate interviews. The special was included as a bonus on One Day at a Time: The Complete First Season DVD set.

On February 26, 2008, Franklin, Phillips, Bertinelli, and Harrington reunited once again to talk about life on the set, Phillips' drug problems, and the show's theme song on NBC's Today Show as part of a week-long segment titled "Together Again: TV's Greatest Casts Reunited".

Bertinelli, Harrington, and (on tape) Franklin appeared on the September 10, 2008, episode of Rachael Ray to celebrate Ray's 40th birthday.

In 2011, Franklin reunited again with Bertinelli on an episode of Hot in Cleveland which marked one of Franklin's last acting roles before her death in 2013. Mackenzie Phillips and Pat Harrington Jr. also made individual cameos on the series.

One Day at a Time was awarded the Innovation Award on the 2012 TV Land Award show on April 29. Accepting the award were Valerie Bertinelli, Bonnie Franklin, Pat Harrington Jr., Richard Masur, Mackenzie Phillips, and Glenn Scarpelli.

In July 2020, Bertinelli, Phillips, Lembeck and Scarpelli reunited on the Stars in the House video podcast, along with producers Norman Lear and Patricia Fass Palmer.

== Home media ==
In April 2007, Sony Pictures Home Entertainment released the first season of One Day at a Time on DVD in Region 1.

In September 2017, it was announced that Shout! Factory had acquired the rights to the series and released One Day at a Time - The Complete Series on DVD in Region 1 in December 2017. Season 2 was released in March 2018. Season 3 was released in June 2018.

DVD name	Ep #	Release date
The Complete First Season	15	April 24, 2007
The Complete Second Season	24	March 27, 2018
The Complete Third Season	24	June 12, 2018
The Complete Series	209	December 5, 2017

== Remake ==
Gloria Calderon Kellett and Mike Royce developed a new version of the series, with a Latino cast, for Netflix, beginning in 2017. Norman Lear also returned for the remake as executive producer. The ensemble is led by Justina Machado, with Rita Moreno, Stephen Tobolowsky, Isabella Gomez, Marcel Ruiz, and Todd Grinnell in supporting roles. Pam Fryman directed the pilot episode.

Several members of the original cast and production crew returned in various capacities throughout the series run. Patricia Fass Palmer returned as a producer for the remake; Mackenzie Philips had a recurring role as drug and alcohol counsellor, Pam; Glenn Scarpelli appeared in the season three episode "The First Time"; and Michael Lembeck directed the season one episode "Sex Talk".

The final season of the remake series screened in 2020.
