= John Ford Stock Company =

Actors often used in John Ford films

The John Ford Stock Company is the name given to the large collection of actors used repeatedly in the films of American director John Ford. Most famous among these was John Wayne, who appeared in twenty-four films and three television episodes for the director.

== Actors ==
Members of the "stock company" include:

Jack Pennick – 41 films, 1 TV episode
Francis Ford (the director's brother) – 32 films
Harry Carey, Sr. – 27 films
John Wayne – 24 films, 3 TV episodes
Ward Bond – 24 films, 2 TV episodes
Harry Tenbrook – 26 films
J. Farrell MacDonald – 25 films
Vester Pegg – 23 films
Mae Marsh – 17 films, 1 TV episode
Frank Baker – 17 films
Duke Lee – 16 films
Joe Harris – 14 films
Danny Borzage – 13 films
Hoot Gibson – 13 films
Willis Bouchey – 9 films, 3 TV episodes
John Carradine – 11 films, 1 TV episode
Ken Curtis – 11 films, 1 TV episode
William Henry – 11 films, 1 TV episode
Victor McLaglen – 12 films
George O'Brien – 12 films
Molly Malone – 11 films
Harry Carey Jr. – 9 films, 1 TV episode
Sam Harris – 10 films
Robert Homans – 10 films
Cliff Lyons – 9 films, 1 TV episode
Robert Parrish – 10 films
Chuck Roberson – 9 films, 1 TV episode
Russell Simpson – 10 films
William Steele – 10 films
Patrick Wayne – 8 films, 2 TV episodes
Henry Fonda – 9 films
Ed Jones – 9 films
John Qualen – 9 films
Mickey Simpson – 9 films
Pat Somerset – 9 films
Hank Worden – 8 films, 1 TV episode
Anna Lee – 8 films, 1 TV episode
Ruth Clifford – 8 films
Mary Gordon – 8 films
James Flavin – 8 films
Ben Hall – 8 films
Chuck Hayward (as actor) – 7 films, 1 TV episode
Harry Strang – 8 films
Carleton Young – 6 films, 2 TV episodes
Brandon Hurst – 7 films
Fred Libby – 7 films
Jane Darwell – 7 films
Steve Pendleton – 7 films
Charles Seel – 5 films, 2 TV episodes
Charles Trowbridge – 7 films
Jack Woods – 7 films
Frank Albertson – 6 films
Mimi Doyle – 6 films
Earle Foxe – 6 films
Si Jenks – 6 films
Robert Lowery – 6 films
James A. Marcus – 6 films
Cyril McLaglen – 6 films
Paul McVey – 6 films
Jack Mower – 6 films
Lionel Pape – 6 films
Arthur Shields – 6 films
Charles Tannen – 6 films
Harry Tyler – 5 films, 1 TV episode
Tom Tyler – 6 films
Jack Walters – 6 films

Scores of actors appeared repeatedly for Ford up to five times. Among the best known of these are:

Five appearances

- Chief John Big Tree
- Berton Churchill
- Donald Crisp
- Andy Devine
- Stepin Fetchit
- Shug Fisher
- Barry Fitzgerald
- Wallace Ford
- Maureen O'Hara
- Ben Johnson
- Joe Sawyer
- O.Z. Whitehead
- Grant Withers

Four appearances

- Edward Brophy
- Charley Grapewin
- Donald Meek
- Vera Miles
- Mildred Natwick
- James Stewart
- Woody Strode
- Slim Summerville
- Blue Washington

Three appearances

- Pedro Armendáriz
- Olive Carey
- Dan Dailey
- Paul Fix
- Preston Foster
- Jeffrey Hunter
- George Irving
- Mike Mazurki
- Thomas Mitchell
- Denver Pyle
- Will Rogers
- C. Aubrey Smith
- Spencer Tracy
- Richard Widmark

Membership in the John Ford Stock Company did not necessitate membership in Ford's social circle, and indeed many of the actors in the Stock Company never encountered Ford outside of work situations.

== Crew ==
Ford had many long-standing relationships with members of his crew, and would often maintain longer and more prolific relationships with crew members than cast.

=== Screenwriters ===
- Frank S. Nugent
- George Hively
- Eugene B. Lewis
- H. Tipton Steck
- Charles J. Wilson Jr.
- Jules Furthman
- George C. Hull
- Dorothy Yost
- Charles Kenyon
- Frances Marion
- James Kevin McGuiness
- John Stone
- Dudley Nichols
- Spig Wead
- Lamar Trotti
- Nunnally Johnson
- Laurence Stallings
- James Warner Bellah
- Philip Dunne

=== Producers ===
- Merian C. Cooper
- P.A. Powers
- Sol Wurtzel
- Cliff Reid
- Darryl F. Zanuck
- Walter Wanger
- Lowell Farrell
- Michael Killanin
- Patrick Ford
- Samuel Goldwyn
- Winfield Sheehan

=== Cinematographers ===
- Gregg Toland
- Ben Reynolds
- John W. Brown
- Harry C. Fowler
- George Schneiderman
- Joseph H. August
- Charles G. Clarke
- Arthur Miller
- Bert Glennon
- Archie Stout
- Winton C. Hoch

=== Editors ===
- Alex Troffey
- Frank E. Hull
- Paul Weatherwax
- George Hively
- Walter Thompson
- Robert Simpson
- Robert Parrish
- Jack Murray
- Barbara Ford
- Otho Lovering

=== Composers ===
- Max Steiner
- Samuel Kaylin
- Louis Silvers
- Alfred Newman
- Richard Hageman
- Victor Young
- Cyril J. Mockridge

=== Art Directors ===
- Van Nest Polglase
- William Darling
- Richard Day
- Mark Lee Kirk
- James Basevi
- Lyle R. Wheeler
- Frank Hotaling
- Martin Obzina
- Eddie Imazu

=== Set Decorators ===
- Thomas Little
- Julia Heron
- Joe Kish
- John McCarthy
- Darrell Silvera

=== Assistant Directors ===
- Edward O'Fearna
- Jack Pennick
- Wingate Smith

=== Second Unit Directors ===
- Cliff Lyons

=== Costume Designers ===
- Walter Plunkett
