= Another Man's Shoes (novel) =

1913 novel

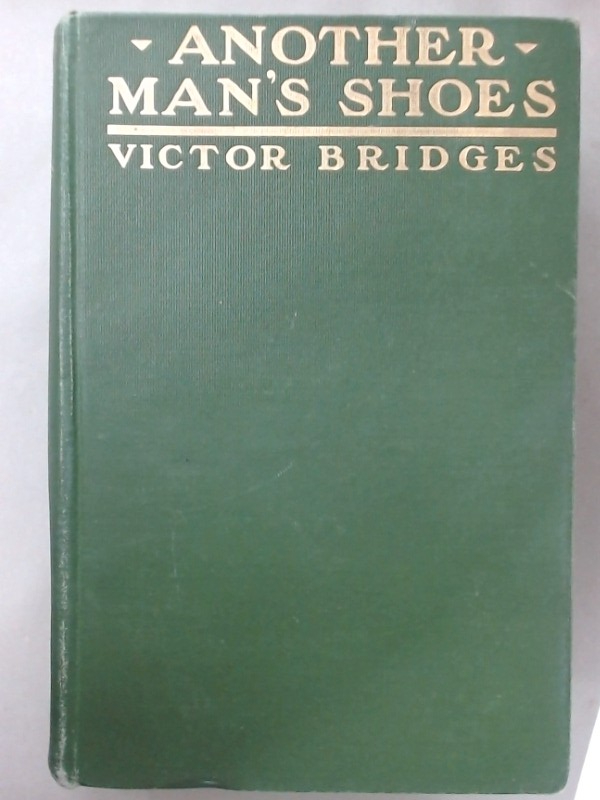
- First Edition (US)
- Author: Victor Bridges
- Language: English
- Genre: Comedy
- Publisher: Hodder & Stoughton (UK); Doran (US)
- Publication date: 1913
- Publication place: United Kingdom
- Media type: Print

Another Man's Shoes is a 1913 comedy novel by the British writer Victor Bridges.

== Adaptations ==
It was made into a 1916 American silent film The Phantom Buccaneer directed by J. Charles Haydon and starring Richard Travers. A second American version Another Man's Shoes was produced in 1922, directed by Jack Conway and starring Herbert Rawlinson and Barbara Bedford.

== Bibliography ==
- Goble, Alan. The Complete Index to Literary Sources in Film. Walter de Gruyter, 1999.
- Reilly, John M. Twentieth Century Crime & Mystery Writers. Springer, 2015.
