= Richard Travers =

Canadian actor (1885–1935)

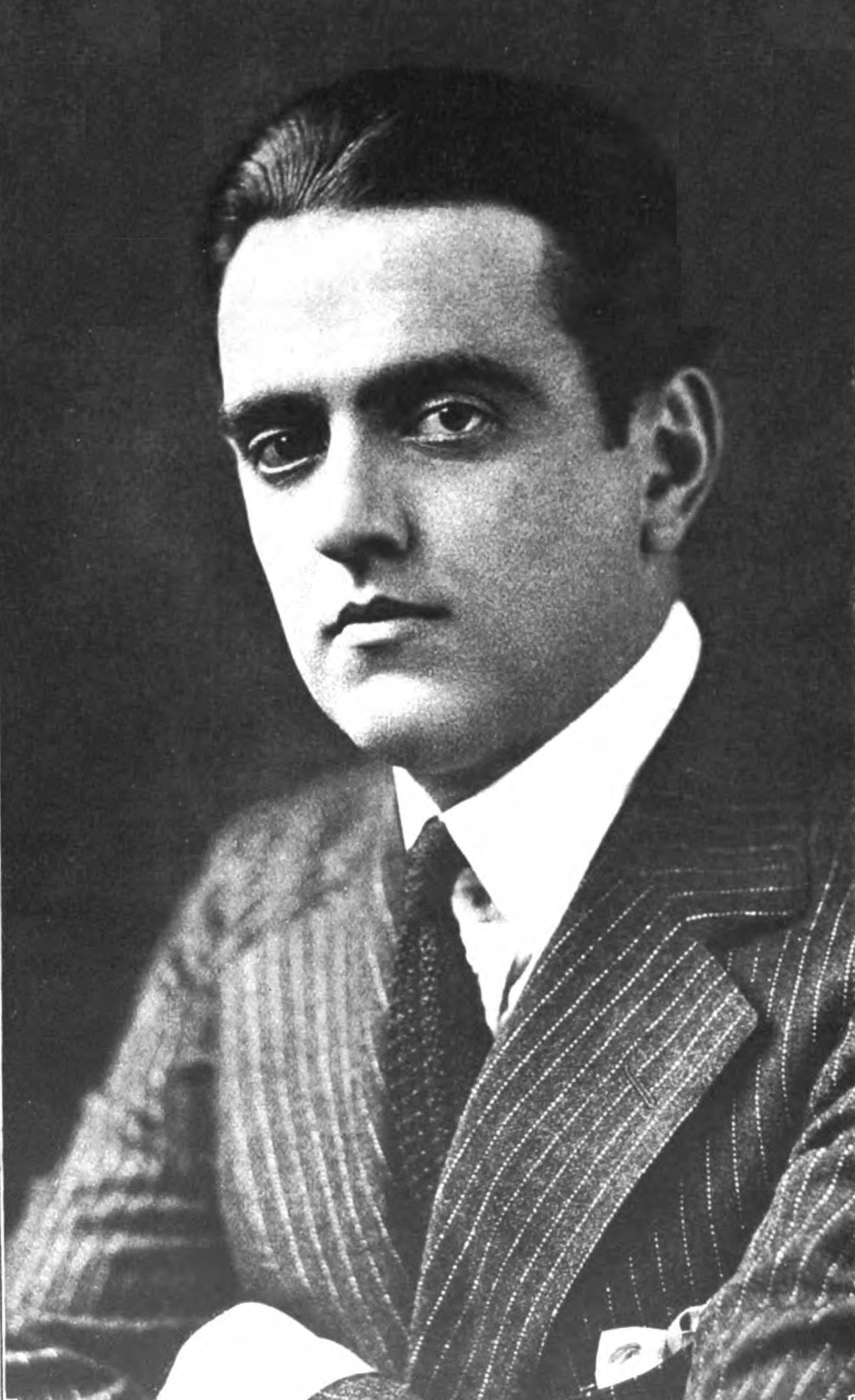
- Travers in 1915
- Born: 15 April 1885; Hudson Bay Trading Post, Northwest Territory, Canada
- Died: 20 April 1935 (aged 50); San Diego, California, U. S.
- Occupation: Actor
- Years active: 1912–1930

Richard Travers (Born Richard Libb; 15 April 1885 – 20 April 1935) was a Canadian film actor of the silent era. He appeared in more than 140 films between 1912 and 1930.

== Early years ==
Travers was born Richard Libb on 15, April 1885, in Hudson Bay Post, Northwest Territory, Canada. He attended St. Andrew College in Glasgow, Scotland. Travers fought with Canadians in the Boer War, with his height making him appear older than his actual 15 years. He received promotions and "was a prime favorite".

== Career ==
Travers performed on stage with stock theater companies and acted in films with the Lubin Manufacturing Company and Essanay Studios.

== Personal life and death ==
Travers was married in 1908. He and his wife, Augusta, separated in 1912 after she refused to accompany him when he went to Philadelphia to act in films. He died of pneumonia on 20 April 1935 in San Diego, California, aged 50.

== Selected filmography ==
- Homespun (1913) short for Essanay
- The Ambition of the Baron (1915)
- The Romance of an American Duchess (1915)
- The White Sister (1915)
- Captain Jinks of the Horse Marines (1916)
- The Phantom Buccaneer (1916)
- The Trufflers (1917)
- The White Moll (1920)
- The Single Track (1921)
- The Rider of the King Log (1921)
- The Mountain Woman (1922)
- Dawn of Revenge (1922)
- Notoriety (1922)
- The Acquittal (1923)
- The Broad Road (1923)
- Mary of the Movies (1923) – cameo
- The Rendezvous (1923)
- The House of Youth (1924)
- Head Winds (1925)
- The Truthful Sex (1926)
- The Dangerous Dude (1926)
- The Still Alarm (1926)
- Lightnin' (1925)
- Melting Millions (1927)
- The Man Without a Face (1928)
- The Black Watch (1929)
- The Unholy Night (1929)
- The Woman Racket (1930)
