= List of One Day at a Time (1975 TV series) episodes =

The following is a list of episodes for the American television sitcom, One Day at a Time. The series premiered on December 16, 1975 on CBS, and ended on May 28, 1984. A total of 209 episodes were produced spanning nine seasons.

== Series overview ==
Season	Episodes	Originally released		Rank	Rating
Season	Episodes	First released	Last released	Rank	Rating
1	15	December 16, 1975	March 30, 1976	12	23.1
2	24	September 28, 1976	March 22, 1977	8	23.4 (Note: Tied with The ABC Sunday Night Movie and Baretta)
3	24	September 27, 1977	April 3, 1978	10	23.0
4	26	September 18, 1978	April 14, 1979	18	21.6
5	26	September 30, 1979	April 13, 1980	10	23.0
6	21	November 9, 1980	May 10, 1981	11	22.0
7	25	October 11, 1981	May 16, 1982	10	22.0
8	26	September 26, 1982	May 23, 1983	16	19.1
9	22	October 2, 1983	May 28, 1984	44	15.9

== Episodes ==
=== Season 1 (1975–76) ===
No. overall	No. in season	Title	Directed by	Written by	Original release date
1	1	"Ann's Decision"	Hal Cooper	Allan Manings, Norman Paul & Jack Elinson	December 16, 1975
Newly divorced and scared Ann Romano is up for her first decision. Her older daughter Julie wants to go on a camping trip with her friend and a couple of boys. Julie threatens to leave her mother and live with her Dad unless Ann says she can go.
2	2	"Chicago Rendezvous"	Don Richardson	Perry Grant & Dick Bensfield	December 23, 1975
Ann has been wined and dined by a new boyfriend named Steve Blanchard (Lyman Ward). Ann doesn't realize how far things have gotten until he invites her to go away with him for the weekend on a trip to Chicago. It soon becomes apparent to everyone but Ann that she is headed for her first fling since her marriage ended.
3	3	"Jealousy"	Noam Pitlik	Kevin Hopps	December 30, 1975
Ann comes down with a bad case of jealousy when Julie and Barbara begin spending time with their father's steady girlfriend, Candy. Meanwhile, Julie is beside herself when her boyfriend Jeff begins paying attention to a sexy cheerleader.
4	4	"How to Succeed Without Trying"	Noam Pitlik & Gloria Monty	Perry Grant & Dick Bensfield	January 6, 1976
David gets Ann a job interview for an assistant to an account executive in a public relations firm. However, Ann is worried that her qualifications for the position won't matter as much as her sex appeal. Meanwhile, Julie coaches Barbara in flirting with her teacher to influence him during exams. Guest star: Robert Mandan
5	5	"David Loves Ann"	Don Richardson	Charlie Hauck	January 13, 1976
One evening after a date, David and Ann get cozy on the couch, but Barbara and Julie decide to put the kibosh on any intimacy. However, David makes the decision that it is the perfect time to ask Ann to marry him and gives her one week to come up with the answer. After two hours go by, he changes his mind and tries to get her to decide right away.
6	6	"Julie's Best Friend"	Don Richardson	Edward Kutner, Steve White & Danny Simon	January 20, 1976
Julie's new best friend is a stuck up rich girl, and Julie quickly demands more expensive things like clothes and that Ann send her to a prestigious school. Ann refuses to give in to Julie simply because she can't afford it, but that is when David steps in offering to kick in some financial aid for the Romano/Cooper household.
7	7	"Super Blues"	Norman Campbell	Perry Grant & Dick Bensfield	January 27, 1976
Ann is throwing a party in her apartment and has invited other tenants in the building. She begins to go through pre-party panic and it doesn't help when Schneider drops in with whistles, joy buzzers and whoopee cushions, expecting an invitation, only to discover he is not wanted. Guest star: Don Diamond
8	8	"All the Way"	Norman Campbell	Howard Ostroff	February 10, 1976
Julie is torn when her current boyfriend, Chuck, wants her to go "all the way" with him. When Ann discovers Julie's problem she advises her to think long and hard and to do what feels right. Later, that evening when she is alone with Chuck, Julie finally makes a decision. William Kirby Cullen makes his first appearance as Chuck Butterfield.
9	9	"Fighting City Hall"	John Robins	John D. Hess	February 17, 1976
Ann is furious when she receives a $4,000 phone bill. She soon begins a letter writing campaign to anyone and everyone, including the President of the United States. Coincidentally, the President just happens to be passing through her neighborhood and Ann soon finds two Secret Service agents at her front door.
10	10	"David Plus Two"	Howard Morris	Perry Grant & Dick Bensfield	February 24, 1976
Ann is comfortable with her platonic relationship with David. However, she has an interesting reaction when she discovers David and a sexy new building tenant in a compromising situation, which brings to the forefront her true feelings for David. Guest star: Susan Bay
11	11	"Julie's Job"	Howard Morris	Frank Buxton	March 2, 1976
Julie has been wanting to buy her boyfriend's car, but Ann refuses to pay for it and advises her to get a job to pay for it herself. So, Julie jumps at the chance when Schneider puts in a good word to help get her a job as a waitress in a grubby diner on a rough side of town. Guest star: Stanley Adams, Joey Forman, Jeannie Linero, Suzanne Somers, Roy Stuart
12	12	"The College Man"	Howard Morris	Story by : Barry Cherin; Teleplay by : Michael Loman	March 9, 1976
Julie is excited and nervous when she has a blind date with a college guy. However, her excitement about the evening turns to confusion and anger when her date, Ken, shows up and he takes an interest in Ann, who appears to enjoy the attention from the younger man. Guest star: Robby Benson
13	13	"Father David"	Howard Morris	Perry Grant & Dick Bensfield	March 16, 1976
Barbara is all excited at the prospects of hosting a party at the apartment for the basketball team. However, once she and Julie manage to talk Ann into allowing it, they hit another roadblock ... no alcohol. The girls soon talk David into chaperoning the party while Ann is away at a wedding and secretly plot to have the guests sneak in the beer.
14	14	"Dad Comes Back (Part 1)"	Sandy Kenyon	Story by : Norman Paul & Jack Elinson; Teleplay by : Norman Paul & Jack Elinson and Dick Bensfield & Perry Grant	March 23, 1976
Ann is excited when she comes home with the news that she got a new job. However, her excitement is dampened when she learns that her ex-husband Ed is stopping by for a visit and has a big announcement: he is engaged and is planning to wed within a few weeks. To be continued... Joseph Campanella makes his first appearance as Ed Cooper.
15	15	"Dad Comes Back (Part 2)"	Sandy Kenyon	Story by : Norman Paul & Jack Elinson; Teleplay by : Norman Paul & Jack Elinson and Dick Bensfield & Perry Grant	March 30, 1976
Barbara and Julie are secretly hoping and plotting to get their mother Ann and their father, Ed back together. They have high hopes, especially when Ann allows Ed to stay over, but both of them are in for a rude awakening and a final acceptance that their parents will never get back together.

=== Season 2 (1976–77) ===
No. overall	No. in season	Title	Directed by	Written by	Original release date
16	1	"The Runaways (Part 1)"	Herbert Kenwith	Perry Grant & Dick Bensfield	September 28, 1976
Julie turns to her boyfriend when she and her mother reach an impasse regarding education, employment and marriage.
17	2	"The Runaways (Part 2)"	Herbert Kenwith	Perry Grant & Dick Bensfield	October 5, 1976
Ann is overcome by guilt after Chuck and Julie run away.
18	3	"The Runaways (Part 3)"	Herbert Kenwith	Perry Grant & Dick Bensfield	October 12, 1976
Schneider uses CB radio to search for Julie and her boyfriend.
19	4	"The Runaways (Part 4)"	Herbert Kenwith	Perry Grant & Dick Bensfield	October 19, 1976
Their possessions stolen, runaways Julie and her boyfriend consider calling Barbara for help.
20	5	"Barbara's Emergence"	Herbert Kenwith	Story by : Kevin Hopps; Teleplay by : Kevin Hopps and Dick Bensfield & Perry Grant	October 26, 1976
Hoping to attract desirable males, Barbara decides to change her image. Guest stars: Michael Goodrow - as Hank the Hunk Christopher Knight and John Putch (first of 14 episodes as 'Bob Morton')
21	6	"David's New Job (Part 1)"	Herbert Kenwith	Norman Paul & Jack Elinson	November 9, 1976
David returns from Los Angeles with a job offer and hopes of marrying Ann. To be continued...
22	7	"David's New Job (Part 2)"	Herbert Kenwith	Jack Elinson & Norman Paul	November 16, 1976
As David works on Barbara and Julie, and as they pressure Ann to consider marrying David, Ann is faced with a serious decision..... she is not ready to marry again. David goes on without her. Note: This is Richard Masur's final episode as a series regular.
23	8	"The Upholstery Ripoff"	Herbert Kenwith	James R. Stein & Bob Illes	November 23, 1976
Ann must deal with an upholstery ripoff that invades her home. Note: This is Mary Louise Wilson's first episode
24	9	"Schneider's Pride and Joy"	Herbert Kenwith	Michael S. Baser & Kim Weiskoph	November 30, 1976
Schneider touts his visiting nephew as a model gentleman, unaware that the youth is a thief. Guest star: Mark Hamill
25	10	"A Visit from Dad"	Herbert Kenwith	Bud Wiser	December 7, 1976
Ann's visiting father tries to persuade her to return home.
26	11	"The Maestro"	Herbert Kenwith	Gy Waldron	December 14, 1976
Ann finds herself attracted to the symphony conductor that her employer has an ad campaign with. Note: Valerie Bertinelli and MacKenzie Phillips do not appear in this episode.
27	12	"Happy New Year"	Herbert Kenwith	Story by : Dick Bensfield & Perry Grant; Teleplay by : Dick Bensfield & Perry Grant and Norman Paul & Jack Elinson	December 28, 1976
The girls put on a New Year's show at a retirement home.
28	13	"J.C. and Julie (Part 1) (a.k.a.) Julie's Decision (Part 1)"	Herbert Kenwith	Joseph Bonaduce	January 4, 1977
Julie's religious zeal is driving Ann and Barbara crazy. To be continued...
29	14	"J.C. and Julie (Part 2) (a.k.a.) Julie's Decision (Part 2)"	Herbert Kenwith	Joseph Bonaduce	January 11, 1977
Julie applies her religious zeal to a drunken derelict, whom she found in a garbage can.
30	15	"The New Car"	Herbert Kenwith	Bob Illes & James R. Stein	January 18, 1977
Ann won't allow her ex-husband to spoil Julie and Barbara with a new car.
31	16	"Schneider Loves Ginny"	Herbert Kenwith	Dick Bensfield & Perry Grant	January 25, 1977
Schneider expects Ginny to leap at his marriage proposal.
32	17	"Ginny's Child"	Herbert Kenwith	Story by : Norman Paul & Jack Elinson; Teleplay by : Joseph Bonaduce	February 1, 1977
Ginny is always depressed after her mysterious Sunday excursions.
33	18	"Julie's Operation"	Herbert Kenwith	Dick Bensfield & Perry Grant	February 8, 1977
With the family doctor away and Julie down with possible appendicitis, Ann accepts the services of a young resident.
34	19	"The Traveling Salesperson"	Herbert Kenwith	Story by : Carol Gary; Teleplay by : Carol Gary and Joseph Bonaduce	February 15, 1977
Ann's boss has second thoughts about a woman's ability to handle the job he just gave to Ann
35	20	"The Butterfields"	Herbert Kenwith	Norman Paul & Jack Elinson	February 22, 1977
Julie writes Chuck a Dear John letter, while Ann finds herself in the middle of a feud between Chuck's parents.
36	21	"Barbara Plus Two"	Herbert Kenwith	Perry Grant & Dick Bensfield	March 1, 1977
Barbara accepts an invitation to a school dance, then can't turn another one down.
37	22	"The Singles Bar"	Herbert Kenwith	Joseph Bonaduce & Bruce Howard	March 8, 1977
Ginny persuades Ann to go to a singles bar. Note: Final appearance by Mary Louise Wilson except in a later clip show;
38	23	"The College Question"	Herbert Kenwith	Rick Mittleman	March 15, 1977
Tired from cramming for entrance exams, Julie doesn't want to go to college any more.
39	24	"The Girls Alone (a.k.a.) Where's Mama?"	Herbert Kenwith	Perry Grant & Dick Bensfield	March 22, 1977
Barbara and Julie want to sneak out to a party on a school night, while Ann is away on a business trip to Las Vegas. But the girls are fearful that their mother might find out that they're heading to the party, so they try to reach Ann via a phone call, only to learn that she didn't reach her hotel. Note: Pat Harrington does not appear in this episode.

=== Season 3 (1977–78) ===
No. overall	No. in season	Title	Directed by	Written by	Original release date
40	1	"The Older Man (Part 1)"	Herbert Kenwith	Dick Bensfield & Perry Grant	September 27, 1977
After Julie plows into a car, its dashing driver offers her a job. To Be Continued... Guest star: Jim Hutton
41	2	"The Older Man (Part 2)"	Herbert Kenwith	Dick Bensfield & Perry Grant	October 4, 1977
Julie's boss invites her on an out-of-town trip. To be Continued....
42	3	"The Older Man (Part 3)"	Herbert Kenwith	Perry Grant & Dick Bensfield	October 11, 1977
Julie is startled by her boss's proposal. To be continued....
43	4	"The Older Man (Part 4)"	Herbert Kenwith	Perry Grant & Dick Bensfield	October 18, 1977
Julie is implored by her father not to marry her 42-year-old boss.
44	5	"Ann's Out-of-Town Client"	Herbert Kenwith	Dick Bensfield & Perry Grant	October 25, 1977
A lecherous client has more than business on his mind.
45	6	"Bob Loves Barbara"	Herbert Kenwith	Jack Elinson & Norman Paul	November 1, 1977
An insecure boy interested in dating Barbara bolsters his confidence by taking out a notorious classmate first.
46	7	"The Second Mrs. Cooper"	Herbert Kenwith	Bud Wiser	November 8, 1977
After Julie and Barbara return home from a weekend visit with their dad complaining that Dad's new wife is trying to cut them out of his life, Ann initiates her first face to face meeting with the new Mrs. Cooper – only to learn that the girls haven't exactly been fair or kind to their new stepmother.
47	8	"The Ghost Writer"	Herbert Kenwith	Joseph Bonaduce	November 22, 1977
When Barbara hands in Julie's verse as her own for a class, a school counselor takes her for a poetic genius.
48	9	"Barbara's Friend (Part 1)"	Herbert Kenwith	Story by : Michael S. Baser & Kim Weiskopf; Teleplay by : Bud Wiser	November 29, 1977
While Barbara agonizes over whether Cliff Randall will invite her to the Grateful Dead concert, she has to contend with an over-eager girl trying to be her friend. When reality sinks in, she reaches out to Barbara at the last moment. To be continued...
49	10	"Barbara's Friend (Part 2)"	Herbert Kenwith	Story by : Michael S. Baser & Kim Weiskopf; Teleplay by : Bud Wiser	December 6, 1977
Barbara's classmate (portrayed by Lindsay V. Jones) phones to say she has overdosed.
50	11	"Schneider's Kid"	Herbert Kenwith	Joseph Bonaduce	December 13, 1977
Julie runs into an attractive young man in the lobby who is looking for Schneider. However, his visit to see Schneider is anything but a social call when he reveals that he is Schneider's son, from a brief marriage 20 years earlier. Ann, Barbara and Julie quickly do their best to prepare Schneider for the news.
51	12	"Ann's Crisis"	Herbert Kenwith	Joan Desberg Greenberg & Jennie Blackton	December 27, 1977
Ann sees her 36th birthday as a crisis, not a cause for celebration.
52	13	"The Race Driver (Part 1)"	Herbert Kenwith	Gy Waldron	January 3, 1978
Schneider makes the grand announcement that a celebrity has just moved into the building, a race car driver named Cam Randolph. Meanwhile, Julie and Barbara have devised a meeting between their mother and Cam, but Ann is initially anything but excited about meeting him. Things start to change, however, once Ann gets to know him. To be continued...
53	14	"The Race Driver (Part 2)"	Herbert Kenwith	Story by : Gy Waldron; Teleplay by : Gy Waldron and Kristan Kincade	January 10, 1978
Ann begins to question her relationship with a dashing race driver.
54	15	"Ann's Secretary"	Herbert Kenwith	Pat Harrington, Jr. & James Burr Johnson	January 17, 1978
Ann learns that a secretary she just hired has epilepsy.
55	16	"Barbara's Rebellion"	Herbert Kenwith	Bud Wiser	January 30, 1978
Frustrated over not getting enough attention at home, Barbara rebels by running away to a Chicago motel room with Bob Morton.
56	17	"The New Owner"	Herbert Kenwith	Perry Grant & Dick Bensfield	February 6, 1978
Determined to keep his job, Schneider woos the building's new owner — who falls for him.
57	18	"Ann's Competitor"	Herbert Kenwith	Story by : Joseph Bonaduce; Teleplay by : Bud Wiser and Joseph Bonaduce	February 13, 1978
Ann has a competitor in the lecherous Francine Webster. First appearance of Shelley Fabares as Francine Webster.
58	19	"The Dress Designer"	Herbert Kenwith	Dick Bensfield & Perry Grant	February 27, 1978
Aspiring designer Julie tries to enter a fashion show after the entry deadline.
59	20	"Take the Money"	Herbert Kenwith	Arnold Horwitt	March 6, 1978
Barbara and Julie are excited about getting a new stereo and decide to buy Schneider's old one for $200. However, as they are scrounging up the money, Julie checks her balance in her checking account and quickly finds that somehow an additional $125 has been credited to her account. Stricken with guilt and Barbara's encouragement, Julie decides to take the money.
60	21	"Barbara the Fink"	Herbert Kenwith	Joseph Bonaduce	March 13, 1978
Barbara is an eyewitness to a vandalism at the school and soon finds herself between a rock and a hard place, over whether or not to do the honest thing and tell the truth, or not say anything and protect a friend. Ultimately, she tells the truth, but then must face possible alienation as a result of her actions.
61	22	"Julie's Big Move (Part 1)"	Herbert Kenwith	Story by : Kristan Kincade & Gy Waldron; Teleplay by : Kristan Kincade & Gy Waldron and Joseph Bonaduce	March 20, 1978
Julie plans to move out, but Ann doubts her daughter can make it financially. To be continued...
62	23	"Julie's Big Move (Part 2)"	Herbert Kenwith	Story by : Kristan Kincade & Gy Waldron; Teleplay by : Bud Wiser	March 27, 1978
Ann thinks Julie's new roommate is a bad influence on her.
63	24	"Ann, the Father"	Alan Rafkin	Perry Grant & Dick Bensfield	April 3, 1978
Ann's career advice to Barbara's friend leads to hard feelings between the boy and his father.

=== Season 4 (1978–79) ===
No. overall	No. in season	Title	Directed by	Written by	Original release date
64	1	"Father, Dear Father (Part 1)"	Alan Rafkin	Dick Bensfield & Perry Grant	September 18, 1978
Ann's ex-husband tells her that he can no longer pay her child support for his daughters. To be continued...
65	2	"Father, Dear Father (Part 2)"	Alan Rafkin	Dick Bensfield & Perry Grant	September 25, 1978
Ed is forced to admit the truth to Julie and Barbara.
66	3	"Ann's Friend"	Alan Rafkin	Anne Convy & Mitzi McCall	October 2, 1978
Ann is stunned when a friend says she is leaving her husband.
67	4	"Bob's New Girl"	Alan Rafkin	Jack Elinson	October 16, 1978
Barbara has been steadily dating Cliff Randall and soon finds herself trying to gently discourage Bob from pursuing her. However, Bob is sure he can win her away from Cliff, until Ann encourages him to perhaps date other women. He does but Barbara's reaction to Bob's new girlfriend is incredibly telling.
68	5	"Schneider's Helper"	Alan Rafkin	Bud Wiser	October 23, 1978
While he is recovering from a back injury, Schneider needs an assistant maintenance man to help out with his work around the building. Barbara suggests that Schneider hire her friend Jackie, who has an intellectual disability. Schneider reluctantly takes on the kid, who does his best to prove he can do the job, but when there is a gas leak in the building, Jackie's competence is put to the test. Note: Mackenzie Phillips does not appear in this episode.
69	6	"Yes, Sir, That's My Baby"	Alan Rafkin	Bud Wiser	November 6, 1978
Sally Chadwick, an old friend of Barbara's, visits and reveals that she has now has a baby boy named Michael. Sally and Michael's father agreed to give him up for adoption, but after taking one look at Michael, Sally decided to keep him and now she's struggling to raise him alone. However, the big bombshell is dropped when Sally reveals that Michael's father is Barbara's boyfriend Cliff.
70	7	"The Dating Game (a.k.a.) Ann's Dating Game"	Alan Rafkin	Gladys Christman	November 13, 1978
Ann is interested in a business associate, but isn't quite sure how to convey her romantic interest to him. Barbara and Julie suggest that she just make the first move and call him, which she does. However, he isn't quite getting the hints and assumes that when she asks him out, the dinner is business instead of pleasure.
71	8	"Peabody's War"	Alan Rafkin	Pat Harrington, Jr. & James Burr Johnson	November 20, 1978
Mr. Peabody, an elderly resident in the apartment building, refuses to pay higher rent or to allow the building's owners to throw him out, because he is old and disabled. He locks himself in the Romanos' apartment with a shotgun, and holds the family hostage until he can get on TV and tell the building's owners to allow him to stay in his apartment and pay a fair rent amount for it.
72	9	"Jealousy (Part 1)"	Alan Rafkin	Dick Bensfield & Perry Grant	November 27, 1978
Julie and Barbara become rivals when they fall for the leader of a rock group. To be continued...
73	10	"Jealousy (Part 2)"	Alan Rafkin	Perry Grant & Dick Bensfield	December 4, 1978
The battle for the band leader continues as Barbara tries to win him back from Julie.
74	11	"The Arab Connection"	Alan Rafkin	Doug Bailey	December 11, 1978
Ann plays hostess to an Arab sheik while Julie leads a demonstration against his country's economic policy.
75	12	"Hold the Mustard"	Alan Rafkin	Perry Grant & Dick Bensfield	December 18, 1978
The pace of Barbara's restaurant job proves to be faster than she anticipated.
76	13	"Girl Talk"	Alan Rafkin	Julie Kirgo & Dinah Kirgo	December 25, 1978
Ann and the girls spend a warm Christmas Eve in a frigid mountain cabin.
77	14	"The Married Man"	Alan Rafkin	Julie Kirgo & Dinah Kirgo and Ed Jurist	January 17, 1979
78	15	"The Married Man"	Alan Rafkin	Julie Kirgo & Dinah Kirgo and Ed Jurist	January 17, 1979
In the first of a three-part story, Ann and a sportswriter begin a promising romance. In the second, a smooth-sailing romance between Ann and a sportswriter hits the rocks.
79	16	"The Married Man (Part 3)"	Alan Rafkin	Bud Wiser	January 24, 1979
Ann considers pursuing a relationship with her married sports writer, but soon concludes that to do so would strip her of her self-respect.
80	17	"Going Nowhere"	Alan Rafkin	Jerry Winnick	January 31, 1979
Julie is depressed because her designing career seems to have reached a dead end. Guest star: Jay Leno
81	18	"Francine Strikes Again"	Alan Rafkin	Bud Wiser	February 7, 1979
Francine uses her feminine wiles to wrest away one of Ann's big accounts.
82	19	"The Dental Hygienist"	Alan Rafkin	Ron Bloomberg	February 14, 1979
Only hours after they meet, Ann's old pal and Schneider are ready to sail off on a romantic cruise.
83	20	"The Piano Teacher"	Alan Rafkin	Perry Grant & Dick Bensfield	February 21, 1979
The baby grand delivered to Ann by mistake belongs to her next-door neighbor, a slightly unstrung piano teacher who begins giving lessons in her living room.
84	21	"The Broken Nose"	Alan Rafkin	Joseph Bonaduce	February 28, 1979
Barbara learns a lesson about beauty after Schneider accidentally opens a door smack into her nose. Schneider differentiates himself from Ohio State football coach Woody Hayes, who was in the news for punching a player 2 months earlier. Note: Mackenzie Phillips does not appear in this episode.
85	22	"Mad for Each Other"	Alan Rafkin	Julie Kirgo & Dinah Kirgo	March 7, 1979
Julie falls for an egotistical filmmaker whose temperament exactly matches her own.
86	23	"The Graduation"	Alan Rafkin	Bud Wiser	March 18, 1979
Barbara's high school graduation has arrived and she is all excited, except for two issues: she is unsure if she wants to attend the University of Wisconsin, like her father did, and trying to make a decision on whether to hang out at a party with friends or one with just family, after graduation.
87	24	"Fear of Success"	Alan Rafkin	Story by : Judy Friend and Ron Bloomberg; Teleplay by : Ron Bloomberg	March 25, 1979
A lucrative offer to direct public relations for a computer firm prompts Ann to give Mr. Davenport two weeks' notice
88	25	"Grandma Leaves Grandpa"	Alan Rafkin	Dinah Kirgo, Julie Kirgo, Ron Bloomberg, & Bud Wiser	April 8, 1979
Ann is all set to go away for the weekend to a ski lodge, but her plans are put to a halt when Grandma Romano drops by with the announcement that she has left Ann's father and now would like to stay with Ann and the girls. Not quite taking her seriously, Ann is dealt a blow of reality when her father drops by needing a place to stay as well.
89	26	"Schneider Gets Fired"	Alan Rafkin	Kathryn Reback	April 15, 1979
Schneider quits because the landlord refuses his raise request.

=== Season 5 (1979–80) ===
No. overall	No. in season	Title	Directed by	Written by	Original release date
90	1	"Back to School"	Alan Rafkin	Julie Kirgo & Dinah Kirgo	September 30, 1979
Barbara has begun her college education and feels very independent, balancing schoolwork with social activities. Meanwhile, Ann begins to feel undereducated as she hears Barbara's experiences and makes a decision to go to college. The big surprise comes when she is taking the same course as Barbara.
91	2	"Pressure"	Alan Rafkin	Julie Kirgo & Dinah Kirgo	October 7, 1979
Brad, Barbara's latest boyfriend, is putting heavy pressure on her to have sex. Barbara honestly does not know what to do and isn't quite sure she wants to accommodate his sexual demands, but at the same time, doesn't want to lose him. So, she decides that perhaps she should and goes out and buys some contraceptives.
92	3	"Julie's Wedding (Part 1)"	Alan Rafkin	Perry Grant & Dick Bensfield	October 14, 1979
Julie returns from a ski trip sporting a meek fiancé, an impending wedding date and an unexcited best man. To be continued... Guest star: Michael Lembeck
93	4	"Julie's Wedding (Part 2)"	Alan Rafkin	Dick Bensfield & Perry Grant	October 21, 1979
Best man Max insists that his amorous intentions toward Julie are honorable, even as the wedding party assembles.
94	5	"Home Again, Home Again"	Alan Rafkin	Bud Wiser	October 28, 1979
Newlyweds Julie and Max return from their honeymoon to an apartment they can't afford because Max has been laid off from his job. Note: Michael Lembeck becomes a regular cast member.
95	6	"Between Mother and Daughter"	Alan Rafkin	Ron Bloomberg	November 4, 1979
A psychiatrist recommends a heart-to-heart talk to take the heat out of Ann's relationship with her mother.
96	7	"Small Wonder"	Alan Rafkin	Julie Kirgo & Dinah Kirgo	November 11, 1979
Barbara hires a genetics tutor (David Coburn), unaware of his obvious shortcomings.
97	8	"Et tu, Ann"	Alan Rafkin	Linda Marsh & Margie Peters	November 25, 1979
Ann pressures her assistant into working on a Saturday night — at her place.
98	9	"A Little Larceny"	Alan Rafkin	Ron Bloomberg	December 2, 1979
Barbara tries to earn some extra money by selling football betting cards. However, Schneider gets arrested when Barbara involves him in her illegal football pool activities.
99	10	"Heart Attack"	Alan Rafkin	Bob Baublitz	December 9, 1979
After Ann rushes out to yet another appointment, her family shouldn't be so surprised to learn she has suffered a heart attack.
100	11	"Male Jealousy"	Alan Rafkin	Winston Moss	December 16, 1979
A feud erupts between Schneider and Max for male dominance in the Romano household, as well as the attention of Ann and the girls.
101	12	"Happy New Year II"	Alan Rafkin	Dick Bensfield & Perry Grant	December 30, 1979
Ann and the family put on another show at the senior citizen hotel. Note: Mackenzie Phillips does not appear in this episode.
102	13	"Schneider, the Model"	Alan Rafkin	James Burr Johnson & Pat Harrington, Jr.	January 6, 1980
After a man-on-the-street chat with a newscaster, Schneider is offered a job as a model, but becomes depressed when he learns the role he is to portray.
103	14	"Triple Play"	Alan Rafkin	Ron Bloomberg	January 27, 1980
A fast talking insurance man from Buffalo can't decide whether he would rather romance Barbara, Ann, or Grandma Romano. NOTE: Mackenzie Phillips does not appear in this episode.
104	15	"So Long, Mom (a.k.a.) Not Telling"	Alan Rafkin	Bud Wiser	February 3, 1980
Barbara's desire to live near campus and Max's new job in Houston have Ann pondering the thought of living alone for the first time in her life. NOTE: Mackenzie Phillips does not appear in this episode.
105	16	"Old Horizons"	Alan Rafkin	Bud Wiser	February 10, 1980
Grandma Romano moves to Indianapolis, takes an apartment in Ann's building, and finds a job in her office. NOTE: Mackenzie Phillips does not appear in this episode.
106	17	"Endless Elliot"	Alan Rafkin	Joseph Bonaduce	February 17, 1980
Barbara is harassed by an overzealous suitor. NOTE: Mackenzie Phillips does not appear in this episode.
107	18	"Retrospective"	Alan Rafkin	Jack Elinson	February 24, 1980
108	19	"Retrospective"	Alan Rafkin	Jack Elinson	February 24, 1980
The topsy-turvy years in Schneider's building are fondly remembered (in clips from past shows) when condominium conversion threatens to disperse the tenants.
109	20	"Girl with a Past"	Alan Rafkin	Margie Peters & Linda Marsh	March 2, 1980
Barbara feels compelled to tell Bob about his new girlfriend's former exploits.
110	21	"Perils of Plastic"	Alan Rafkin	Gary Jacobs	March 9, 1980
A binge of credit-card spending leads Max and Julie to insolvency. Note: This is Mackenzie Phillips' final appearance as a series regular until' Season 8. Pat Harrington does not appear in this episode.
111	22	"No Laughing Matter"	Alan Rafkin	Bill Reed	March 16, 1980
After Schneider's rebuff during an outing to a comedy club, Ann brings home a footloose funny man.
112	23	"Connor's Crisis"	Alan Rafkin	Story by : Linda Marsh & Margie Peters; Teleplay by : Ron Bloomberg and Diana Kirgo & Julie Kirgo	March 23, 1980
Ann's boss, Mr. Connors, is going through a rough time after his wife walks out on him, citing that he has become too boring for her taste. To cheer him up, Ann invites him out to dinner, but when Schneider crashes the dinner, Mr. Connors gets some lessons in picking up the ladies and ends up with a gold-digger.
113	24	"Grecian Yearn"	Alan Rafkin	Dinah Kirgo & Julie Kirgo	March 30, 1980
Ann's archeology professor offers her love and companionship and asks her to live with him in Greece.
114	25	"Pen Pals"	Alan Rafkin	Ron Bloomberg	April 6, 1980
Schneider's cellmate from a gambling bust shows up and demands first class treatment or else.
115	26	"The Spirit is Willing"	Alan Rafkin	Perry Grant & Dick Bensfield	April 13, 1980
While Schneider is making love to his girlfriend, she has a heart attack which ultimately leaves Schneider impotent. Schneider then goes to great lengths to remedy his problem, to no avail. That is, until Ann makes a suggestion concerning an ex-flame of Schneider's, but Schneider is unsure if he wants to take her advice.

=== Season 6 (1980–81) ===
No. overall	No. in season	Title	Directed by	Written by	Original release date
116	1	"Teacher's Pet"	Alan Rafkin	Julie Kirgo & Dinah Kirgo	November 9, 1980
Barbara goes all out on a paper for a government class and ends up with a D. When she goes in to see her professor, she soon discovers that she can get a higher grade on her paper, that is, if she accepts her professor's advances. Later, Barbara decides to bring him to justice and files a complaint against him.
117	2	"The Amarillo Connection"	Alan Rafkin	Bud Wiser	November 16, 1980
Thanks to Ann's hard work, Connors & Davenport has just landed a brand new account and Ann is all excited about the possibilities of a promotion. She soon finds herself battling with Francine over it, but ultimately she gets it, only to discover it means moving to Amarillo, Texas.
118	3	"Ann Meets Nick (Part 1)"	Alan Rafkin	Perry Grant & Dick Bensfield	November 23, 1980
Ann's attempts to land her own advertising accounts lead to repeated run-ins with an irritating commercial artist. To be continued... Guest star: Ron Rifkin
119	4	"Ann Meets Nick (Part 2)"	Alan Rafkin	Perry Grant & Dick Bensfield	November 30, 1980
Ann and Nick do so well on their first campaign that he wants to form a partnership with her.
120	5	"Farewell, My Suite"	Alan Rafkin	Story by : Bud Wiser, Dick Bensfield & Perry Grant; Teleplay by : Joseph Bonaduce	December 7, 1980
Ann and Barbara return from a weekend trip to find they've been robbed, with Schneider's assistance. Note: Ron Rifkin becomes a regular cast member
121	6	"Merry Widow"	Alan Rafkin	Annie Caroline Schuler	December 14, 1980
Ann's father has died, and her mother is chronically depressed until Schneider takes her out on the town.
122	7	"The Drop Out"	Alan Rafkin	Bud Wiser	December 21, 1980
Barbara's search for an interesting major leads her to the conclusion that she is not ready to continue her education.
123	8	"A Shot in the Dark"	Alan Rafkin	Julie Kirgo & Dinah Kirgo	January 4, 1981
Former tenants ask Schneider to help them conceive a child through artificial insemination. Note: Glenn Scarpelli becomes a regular cast member
124	9	"Sunday Father"	Alan Rafkin	Annie Caroline Schuler	January 11, 1981
Alex is fed up with Nick's plans for their father-and-son weekends.
125	10	"November Song"	Alan Rafkin	Pat Harrington, Jr. & James Burr Johnson	January 18, 1981
126	11	"November Song"	Alan Rafkin	Pat Harrington, Jr. & James Burr Johnson	January 18, 1981
Schneider falls madly in love with a woman who prizes her freedom above everything. Schneider is overcome by jealousy at the thought of going fishing while his young girlfriend is alone with a man her own age.
127	12	"Five Fingered Discount"	Alan Rafkin	Alfred Wilson	February 1, 1981
An old family secret surfaces when Grandma Romano gets pinched for shoplifting.
128	13	"I Do, I Do"	Alan Rafkin	Dick Bensfield, Perry Grant, & Bud Wiser	February 15, 1981
Barbara joins a committee to assist a young man about to lose his immigration status, which could condemn him to prison in his native land.
129	14	"A Tiny Romance"	Alan Rafkin	Ron Bloomberg	February 22, 1981
Ann is convinced that her constant bickering with business partner Nick is related to sexual tension.
130	15	"Out of Bounds"	Alan Rafkin	Brad Rider	March 8, 1981
Beerbelly's wife, dissatisfied with her marriage, makes a play for Schneider.
131	16	"Once a Mom"	Alan Rafkin	Story by : Dick Bensfield, & Perry Grant; Teleplay by : David Silverman & Stephen Sustarsic	March 15, 1981
Ann has the flu, and the last thing she wants is for her mother to play nursemaid.
132	17	"Alex's Project"	Alan Rafkin	Stephen Sustarsic & David Silverman	April 5, 1981
Nick won't let Alex get away with turning in a shoddy science project.
133	18	"Caveat Emptor"	Alan Rafkin	Bud Wiser & Ron Bloomberg	April 5, 1981
A new account is going well for Ann and Nick until they realize the merchant is involved in a bait-and-switch scheme.
134	19	"Small Wonder II"	Asaad Kelada	Julie Kirgo & Dinah Kirgo	April 19, 1981
Ted Loomis, the young man who once tutored Barbara, comes by the Romano apartment for a visit. Ted has graduated from college at 14, but is having a hard time finding a job. Schneider and Barbara quickly come up with a plan that results in Ted becoming Barbara's boss at the sporting goods store and quickly turns him into a mini-dictator.
135	20	"Wicked Ann"	Alan Rafkin	Joseph Bonaduce	May 3, 1981
Alex begins to resent Ann's relationship with his father and accuses her of keeping his father and mother apart.
136	21	"Indianapolis Story"	Alan Rafkin	Ron Bloomberg & Bud Wiser	May 10, 1981
Nick and Ann manage to get the apartment to themselves, only to have Ann's old boyfriend David arrive at their door. Note: Final appearances by Richard Masur and Ron Rifkin.

=== Season 7 (1981–82) ===
No. overall	No. in season	Title	Directed by	Written by	Original release date
137	1	"Alex Moves In"	Alan Rafkin	Stephen Sustarsic & David Silverman	October 11, 1981
Following Nick's death in a car accident with a drunk driver, Alex begins feeling lonely and unwanted, especially since his mother has remarried. This leads him to run away from home in Chicago and hop a bus to Indianapolis with a plan to talk Ann and Barbara into letting him move in with them.
138	2	"Airport"	Alan Rafkin	Arnold Kane	October 18, 1981
Ann is flying into Indianapolis, but her flight has been delayed. This leads Schneider, Barbara and Alex to pass the time waiting in the airport and each one of them has an encounter with the opposite sex, all of which seem promising, but things quickly go awry.
139	3	"Shake Hands"	Alan Rafkin	Ron Bloomberg	October 25, 1981
Ann's business is in severe trouble as she is finding it hard to keep up with the bills. This is when her old nemesis, Francine Webster steps in and offers to become her partner. However, Francine has a difficult time trying to convince Ann that she would be the perfect partner, until a prospective client appears and Francine works her magic.
140	4	"Julie Shows Up (Part 1)"	Alan Rafkin	Perry Grant & Dick Bensfield	November 8, 1981
Barbara and Ann return home one evening to discover they have an unexpected houseguest, Julie. It seems Julie has left Max due to severe marital problems. She thinks he is having an affair and confides in Ann and Barbara that she indeed has cheated on Max. Max soon arrives after a phone call from Ann, and is in for a shock as Julie plans to drop her bombshell on him. To be continued...
141	5	"Julie Shows Up (Part 2)"	Alan Rafkin	Perry Grant & Dick Bensfield	November 15, 1981
A stunned Max keeps his distance from Julie after learning that she had an affair. Meanwhile, Julie has no idea where she wants her marriage to go, but is soon in for a shock, she is pregnant. This leads Ann to step in and try to help mend Max and Julie's strained relationship.
142	6	"Dinner at Seven (Part 1)"	Alan Rafkin	Bud Wiser	November 29, 1981
Barbara schedules back to back dates with two guys, but the first won't take her home. To be continued... Guest star: Boyd Gaines
143	7	"Dinner at Seven (Part 2)"	Alan Rafkin	Bud Wiser	December 6, 1981
Barbara hatches a plan to repay Mark for their disastrous first date.
144	8	"Plain Favorite"	Alan Rafkin	Anthony Bonaduce & Celia Bonaduce	December 20, 1981
Ann's cousin Sophie stops in Indianapolis for a visit. She quickly hits it off with Schneider after displaying her knowledge of hardware, and they begin seeing each other. However, an upcoming dance at Schneider's lodge has him in quandary. Should he take Maxine, a girl who he considers flashy and attractive, or Sophie, who he considers rather plain and mousy?
145	9	"Alex's First Love"	Alan Rafkin	Story by : Christine Tibbles; Teleplay by : George Tibbles	December 27, 1981
Alex's first date stirs Ann's protective parenting instincts.
146	10	"Not So Silent Partner"	Alan Rafkin	Stephen Sustarsic & David Silverman	January 3, 1982
Schneider becomes the not-so-silent business partner of Ann and Francine after the bank turns down their loan.
147	11	"Gift Horses"	Alan Rafkin	Paul Perlove	January 17, 1982
Ann leaves on a business trip just before a storm from two gale-force grandmas, Grandma Cooper and Grandma Romano, inundate the Romano apartment. Barbara must bear the brunt of the storm as she soon finds herself being showered with gifts. Grandma Romano buys her an electric organ and Grandma Cooper upstages her by giving Barbara a trip to Hawaii.
148	12	"Stick'em Up"	Alan Rafkin	Arnold Kane	January 24, 1982
Ann, Schneider, Grandma Romano and Bob are all planning a surprise birthday party for Barbara at the sporting good store where she works. Everyone manages to sneak into the store room in preparation, but unwelcome guests arrive and take Barbara at gunpoint in a robbery attempt. Everyone eventually gets locked up in the storeroom, but no one is in the mood for celebrations.
149	13	"Ann's Failure"	Alan Rafkin	George Tibbles	January 31, 1982
Ann is sorely troubled by intimations of her own mortality that are triggered by Barbara's engagement.
150	14	"Grandma's Nest Egg"	Alan Rafkin	Ron Bloomberg	February 7, 1982
Francine's father and Grandma Romano are a hot item until she learns his line of work.
151	15	"Barbara's Crisis"	Alan Rafkin	Anne Convy & Mitzi McCall	February 21, 1982
Barbara is a little nervous about an upcoming doctor appointment with her gynecologist. Later, Barbara has heartbreaking news to break to Ann and Mark; it seems that she may not be able to conceive a child. This throws all her plans up in the air, and she fears that her relationship with Mark will be over when he finds out; Schneider's birthday approaches. Note: This episode won the 1982 Emmy Award for Outstanding Directing in a Comedy Series.
152	16	"Mrs. O'Leary's Kids"	Alan Rafkin	Paul Perlove	March 7, 1982
Alex doesn't feel like the hero he is hailed as after saving lives in an apartment blaze, because he caused the fire in the first place.
153	17	"Diamonds Are Forever"	Alan Rafkin	Hollace White & Stephanie Garman	March 14, 1982
The men go fishing and the women await their return, but all have one thing in common: they're talking about marriage.
154	18	"The Defector"	Alan Rafkin	Jordan Moffet	March 21, 1982
Ann prepares her home for a visit from a Russian women's basketball team. When the team arrives, one member, Olga takes a liking to Schneider. When Schneider reciprocates, Olga makes a decision to defect and marry Schneider, which infuriates Ann.
155	19	"Meow, Meow"	Alan Rafkin	Ron Bloomberg	March 28, 1982
Ann and Francine battle over the same man.
156	20	"Hardball"	Alan Rafkin	Elias Davis & David Pollock	April 4, 1982
Alex is desperate to find a new coach for his softball team, and tries to recruit Ann and Barbara. Meanwhile, Max arrives in Indianapolis on a business trip and stays at the Romano apartment. He quickly accepts Alex's offer and becomes the new coach, but this may prove to be a bad move on Alex's part, since Max wants to bench the inadequate player.
157	21	"Vegas (Part 1)"	Alan Rafkin	Paul Perlove	April 11, 1982
At a dentistry convention in Las Vegas, Barbara and Mark consider avoiding the hassle of wedding arrangements with a quickie Vegas marriage ceremony. To be continued...
158	22	"Vegas (Part 2)"	Alan Rafkin	Paul Perlove	April 18, 1982
The family rushes off to Las Vegas to talk Barbara out of a quickie marriage ceremony.
159	23	"Orville and Emily"	Alan Rafkin	Perry Grant & Dick Bensfield	May 2, 1982
The annual variety show for the Park Utopia senior-citizens hotel takes place.
160	24	"Hear Today, Gone Tomorrow"	Alan Rafkin	David Silverman & Stephen Sustarsic	May 9, 1982
It is coming through loud and clear, Schneider is going deaf.
161	25	"It's in the Cards"	Alan Rafkin	Ron Bloomberg	May 16, 1982
Grandma Romano tries her hand at a new career: fortune-telling.

=== Season 8 (1982–83) ===
No. overall	No. in season	Title	Directed by	Written by	Original release date
162	1	"The Perfect Wedding (Part 1)"	Alan Rafkin	Bernie Thomann	September 26, 1982
Barbara's nerves are on edge as her wedding day approaches and husband-to-be Mark is no help, he is more interested in his golf game than helping with the preparations. To be continued.... Note: Shelley Fabares, Boyd Gaines, Michael Lembeck, and Mackenzie Phillips are now regular cast members. However, Lembeck and Phillips are only credited for the episodes in which they appear, and Gaines and Fabares aren't credited for every episode early in the season.
163	2	"The Perfect Wedding (Part 2)"	Alan Rafkin	Bernie Thomann	October 3, 1982
Mark refuses to cancel his golf game, and Barbara's worried he won't get to the church on time. Note: Joseph Campanella last appearance as Ed Cooper.
164	3	"The Honeymoon is Over"	Alan Rafkin	George Tibbles	October 10, 1982
Barbara tries to adapt to life at Mark's rooming house, where her new husband's friends, including a scantily-clad woman, breeze in and out without knocking to use the bathroom, or asking to use the closet and community refrigerator.
165	4	"Catcher in the Mud"	Alan Rafkin	James Burr Johnson & Pat Harrington, Jr.	October 17, 1982
Believing Alex needs a father figure and more male influence, Schneider and his beer-guzzling buddies take him to a female mud-wrestling show. Note: Ran with the Season 7 opening credits, so Boyd Gaines appears in the episode but isn't in the opening credits.
166	5	"Last Time I Saw Paris"	Alan Rafkin	Mitzi McCall & Annie Convy	October 24, 1982
To land a new French account, Francine talks Ann into a weekend trip to Paris to learn about the French market.
167	6	"Auntie Francine"	Alan Rafkin	Jill Gordan	October 31, 1982
Ann may be a little envious of Francine's freewheeling lifestyle, especially after Francine takes Alex for the weekend and shows him the time of his life. Note: Ran with the Season 7 opening credits, so Shelley Fabares appears in the episode but isn't in the opening credits.
168	7	"Lovers & Other Parents"	Alan Rafkin	Paul Perlove	November 7, 1982
Barbara's scheme to get her mother and Mark's newly divorced father, Sam, together at a dinner party gets faster results than she anticipated. Note: First appearance by Howard Hesseman. Guest star: Eve Plumb
169	8	"Miracle of Birth (Part 1)"	Alan Rafkin	George Tibbles	November 21, 1982
Julie's announcement that her baby will be born underwater may be more than Ann can bear. To be continued...
170	9	"Miracle of Birth (Part 2)"	Alan Rafkin	George Tibbles	November 28, 1982
Julie insists on flying to California to have her baby in an underwater birth tank, but her labor pains are beginning at her mother's home in Indianapolis.
171	10	"First Things First"	Alan Rafkin	Peter Noah	December 12, 1982
Barbara's decision to enroll in college forces the Royers to live on a shoestring budget with little time for romance.
172	11	"Pride and Privacy (Part 1)"	Alan Rafkin	Peter Noah	December 19, 1982
Forced out of their rooming house by an explosion, Barbara and Mark impose on Ann for a temporary home until they can find a place of their own. To be continued....
173	12	"Pride and Privacy (Part 2)"	Alan Rafkin	Paul Perlove	December 26, 1982
With Julie, Max and the new baby also needing a place to live, Ann may be forced to leave her own home to preserve her sanity and her relationship with Sam. To be continued....
174	13	"Pride and Privacy (Part 3)"	Alan Rafkin	George Tibbles	January 2, 1983
Unable to cope with the pandemonium at her house, Ann takes refuge at Sam's place, until he offers her a solution for which she is completely unprepared.
175	14	"The Cruise"	Alan Rafkin	George Tibbles	January 23, 1983
Grandma Romano returns from a vacation cruise with news that she is marrying the shipboard piano player.
176	15	"Spare the Child"	Alan Rafkin	Joe Viola	January 30, 1983
Alex's video game fascination has him skipping school and facing punishment from the principal, and may be symptomatic of hidden emotional problems.
177	16	"The Hero"	Alan Rafkin	C.M. Leon & Margaret Weisman	February 13, 1983
Saving a businessman's life earns Schneider executive status in a job, complete with a secretary, a plush office, a rent-free apartment nearby and very little work to do.
178	17	"The Good Life"	Alan Rafkin	Perry Grant & Dick Bensfield	February 20, 1983
A South Pacific island would be just the ticket for Sam, if only Ann would drop her work, desert the family and join him in paradise.
179	18	"Social Insecurity"	Alan Rafkin	Bud Wiser	March 6, 1983
Determined not to be a burden on anyone, Grandma Romano keeps her escalating financial problems from Ann.
180	19	"A Young Man's Fancy"	Alan Rafkin	Story by : Dick Bensfield & Perry Grant; Teleplay by : George Tibbles	March 7, 1983
Approaching his 15th birthday, Alex anticipates his first female encounter. But when he strikes out with the school's "girl most likely to," he makes a play for an older woman.
181	20	"The Letter"	Alan Rafkin	Paul Perlove	March 14, 1983
A letter to Ann's mother from her father, mailed the day before he died, is delivered four years later.
182	21	"Buyer's Remorse"	Alan Rafkin	Anthony Bonaduce & Joseph Bonaduce	March 21, 1983
Barbara's old boyfriend Bob reveals he still has feelings for her.
183	22	"Sonny Boy"	Alan Rafkin	George Tibbles	March 28, 1983
A weekend outing with a girl from school is more attractive to Alex than the father-son night he agreed to attend at Schneider's lodge. Note: Valerie Bertinelli does not appear in this episode.
184	23	"Panzini"	Noam Pitlik	Pat Harrington, Jr. & James Burr Johnson	May 2, 1983
Ann has been expecting a visit from a top Sicilian designer, named Guido Panzini, who bears a striking resemblance to Schneider. When he arrives, he and Francine immediately hit it off and start seeing each other. This puts a kink in Schneider's plans of romancing Francine.
185	24	"Sisters"	Alan Rafkin	Perry Grant & Dick Bensfield	May 9, 1983
Mark and Max rent a house without consulting their wives.
186	25	"Second Time Around"	Alan Rafkin	Peter Perlove & Bud Wiser	May 16, 1983
Ann picks up the morning newspaper and is in for a shock: Sam has set a wedding date for the two of them, and he hasn't even proposed yet. It seems the two are to get married in three days, but Ann is overcome with a case of premarital jitters, though they aren't as bad as the jitters that Sam has, causing him to phone a radio talk show for advice.
187	26	"Honeymoon II"	Alan Rafkin	George Tibbles	May 23, 1983
Ann and Sam leave for their honeymoon and arrive at their destination, a ski lodge. Things immediately get off on the wrong foot as the airline loses Ann's luggage, but things get even worse when Sam injures his back on a ski lift, which lands him in bed for most of the honeymoon. Note: Final appearance by Glenn Scarpelli.

=== Season 9 (1983–84) ===
No. overall	No. in season	Title	Directed by	Written by	Original release date
188	1	"Shakedown"	Noam Pitlik	George Tibbles	October 2, 1983
Sam and Ann are adjusting to married life, and find they disagree on monumental issues, such as where the spoons should be kept. Note: This is the only time the writing and directing credits are shown at the start of an episode.
189	2	"Take My Ex"	Noam Pitlik	Paul Haggis	October 16, 1983
A visit from Sam's ex-wife sparks a sudden need for attention in Ann, who resents the pampering the former Mrs. Royer receives from Sam.
190	3	"The Dentist"	Noam Pitlik	George Tibbles	October 23, 1983
The opening of his new dental office gives Mark such a case of the jitters that he may give up his practice before the first patient walks through the door.
191	4	"The Bedtime Story"	Noam Pitlik	Lindsay Harrison	October 30, 1983
A plan to collaborate on the writing of children's stories drives Julie and Max into a bitter feud over Max's potential as a writer. Note: Bonnie Franklin and Pat Harrington Jr. do not appear in this episode. Final scripted appearance by Mackenzie Phillips. (She appears in a flashback in episode 21, "Off We Go.")
192	5	"Worried Heart"	Noam Pitlik	Janis Hirsch	November 6, 1983
Ann's imagination runs away with her when Sam runs off on a business trip with an associate, who happens to be his ex-girlfriend.
193	6	"Baby Love"	Noam Pitlik	Deidre Fay & Stuart Wolpert	December 4, 1983
194	7	"Baby Love"	Noam Pitlik	Deidre Fay & Stuart Wolpert	December 4, 1983
A weekend watching little Annie for Max and Julie has Barbara longing to have her own baby, and she begins considering the option of adoption.
195	8	"Travel Agent"	Noam Pitlik	Perry Grant & Dick Bensfield	December 18, 1983
To arrange a long-overdue vacation, Barbara and Mark visit a travel agency, where Barbara finds an unexpected career opportunity.
196	9	"Not a Creature Was Staying"	Tony Singletary	Kimberly Hill	December 25, 1983
Ann has the holiday blues, believing she and Sam will be alone on Christmas, but Sam plans to surprise her with a Caribbean cruise.
197	10	"Sam's Apartment"	Noam Pitlik	Linda Elstad	January 1, 1984
Sam's late-night disappearance has the family convinced he has been kidnapped until Ann learns he has kept his old apartment.
198	11	"Dear Max"	Noam Pitlik	Story by : Deidre Fay & Stuart Wolpert; Teleplay by : Perry Grant & Dick Bensfield	January 8, 1984
It is Grandma Romano's birthday, but no one feels like celebrating when Julie leaves Max a Dear John letter.
199	12	"Never Hire a Relative"	Tony Singletary	Linda Elstad	January 15, 1984
Francine goes behind Ann's back to talk Sam into designing an elaborate office suite that is too grandiose for Ann's taste.
200	13	"Fifty"	Noam Pitlik	George Tibbles	February 12, 1984
Schneider has a sentimental reunion with his high-school love, who pays him a visit on his 50th birthday, bringing along her own cherished memories of their past.
201	14	"Woman of the House"	Noam Pitlik	Perry Grant & Dick Bensfield	March 7, 1984
Barbara loses charge of her household when Grandma Romano moves in with her own set of rules, menus, meal schedules and a collection of cuckoo clocks.
202	15	"Parting Company"	Tony Singletary	Paul Haggis	March 14, 1984
Ann and Francine's business relationship is threatened when Francine announces she is marrying an ad executive Ann doesn't trust.
203	16	"Ave Romano"	Selig Frank & Bonnie Franklin	Story by : Dick Bensfield & Perry Grant; Teleplay by : George Tibbles	March 21, 1984
An Italian priest arrives unexpectedly at the Royers, claiming to be a distant relative of Grandma Romano.
204	17	"Bring in the Clowns"	Noam Pitlik	George Tibbles	April 4, 1984
Mark's jokester friends are visiting and taking their jokes too far to the point where everyone gets sick of them. Barbara gets so fed up that she tries to teach them a lesson by "getting hurt."
205	18	"Up in Smoke"	Tony Singletary	C.M. Leon & Margaret Weisman	April 25, 1984
After six years of not smoking, Sam lights up. But when he tries to quit, he finds his willpower has gone up in smoke.
206	19	"Meaning of Life"	Tony Singletary	Paul Haggis	May 2, 1984
Schneider gets a new lease on life after he is accidentally electrocuted, then revived, a hair raising experience in which he claims he died and came back to life.
207	20	"The Nearness of You"	Selig Frank & Bonnie Franklin	Dick Bensfield & Perry Grant	May 14, 1984
Working side by side at the travel agency spawns a growing attraction between Max and Barbara that becomes impossible to ignore.
208	21	"Off We Go"	Noam Pitlik	Perry Grant, Dick Bensfield & George Tibbles	May 21, 1984
Ann gets a job offer in London and considers taking it. Despite getting nagged by her mother, she decides to accept the job. This leads her to wonder how she is going to tell the rest of her family that she is leaving. Note: Final appearance by Bonnie Franklin
209	22	"Another Man's Shoes"	Noam Pitlik	Perry Grant & Dick Bensfield	May 28, 1984
Schneider learns that his brother died and that somebody needs to take care of his nephew Keith (Corey Feldman) and niece Lori, so Schneider gets a phone call to come and pick them up. The place where he arrives is a carnival-like place with circus-like people. This place needs repairs and some "manly guidance", so everyone tries to persuade Schneider to move there and with Ann gone and the kids grown up, Schneider finally accepts the move. Note: Pat Harrington Jr. and Valerie Bertinelli are the only cast members to appear in the series finale. Note: The episode was designed as a backdoor pilot for a spinoff that was not picked up by CBS.
