= Victor Bridges =

English author (1878–1972)

Victor Bridges (real name: Victor George de Freyne; 14 March 1878 – 29 November 1972) was a prolific English author of detective and fantasy fiction, and also a playwright and occasional poet.

== Life ==
Born on 14 March 1878 at Clifton, Bristol, Victor George de Freyne may have been connected with a propertied family in County Sligo, Ireland. He was educated at Haileybury and Imperial Service College. He worked as a bank employee and as an actor in repertory theatre before becoming a full-time writer.

Bridges began to publish crime and mystery stories and novels regularly in 1909. He was an early signing by the new London publishing firm of Mills & Boon, which was initially a light fiction publisher in a wide range of genres. Many of his stories were set in Essex and East Anglia. He also had two volumes of poetry published.

He married in 1920 Margaret Lindsay Mackay, who died in 1957. He himself died on 29 November 1972.

== Selected works ==
- Camping Out: For Boy Scouts and Others (1912)
- The Man from Nowhere (1913)
- Jetsam (1914)
- A Rogue by Compulsion: An Affair of the Secret Service (1915)
- Mr. Lyndon at Liberty (1915, filmed in that year)
- Another Man's Shoes (1916, filmed 1922, also as The Phantom Buccaneer, 1916)
- The Lady from Long Acre (1918, filmed 1921, also as Greater Than a Crown in 1925)
- The Cruise of the 'Scandal', and Other Stories (1920)
- Greensea Island (1922, filmed as Through Fire and Water, 1923)
- Another Pair of Spectacles: A Farce in One Act (1923)
- The Red Lodge: A Mystery of Campden Hill (1924)
- A Handful of Verses (1924)
- The Backsliders (with Edgar Jepson, 1925)
- The Girl in Black (1926)
- The Green Monkey: A Comedy (1929)
- The Secret of the Creek (1930)
- The King Comes Back (1930)
- Edward Fitzgerald and Other Verses (1932)
- Three Blind Mice: An Adventure in the Essex Marshes (1933); US: I Did Not Kill Osborne: An Adventure in the Essex Marshes (1934)
- The Happy Murderers: An Adventure on the Suffolk Coast (1934)
- Peter in Peril (1935)
- Blue Silver (1936)
- It Happened in Essex (1938)
- The Seven Stars (1939)
- Dusky Night (1940)
- The House on the Saltings (1941)
- The Man Who Butted In (1942)
- The Gulls Fly Low (1943)
- It Never Rains (1944)
- Trouble on the Thames (1945)
- The Man Who Limped (1947)
- Accidents Will Happen (1948)
- Quite Like Old Days (1949)
- The Tenth Commandment (1951)
- We Don't Want to Lose You (1952)
- The Man From Nowhere (1952)
- All Very Irregular (1953)
- The Man Who Vanished (1954)
- What The Doctor Ordered (1956)
- Exit Mr. Marlowe (1957)
- The Creaking Gate (1958)
- The Girl From Belfast (1961)
