= Little Tuesday =

American actress

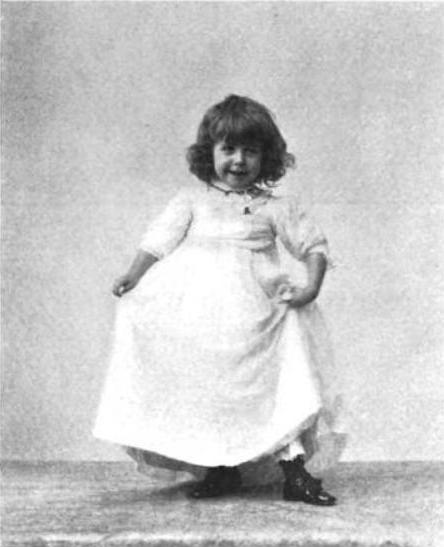
- Charlotte Selina Wood, aka Little Tuesday, circa 1890
- Born: c. 1887
- Spouse: George T. Zimmerman

Little Tuesday (1887–?), born as Charlotte Selina Wood, was an American child actress and niece of playwright Joseph Arthur who had a period of novelty popularity in the early 1890s.

== Biography ==
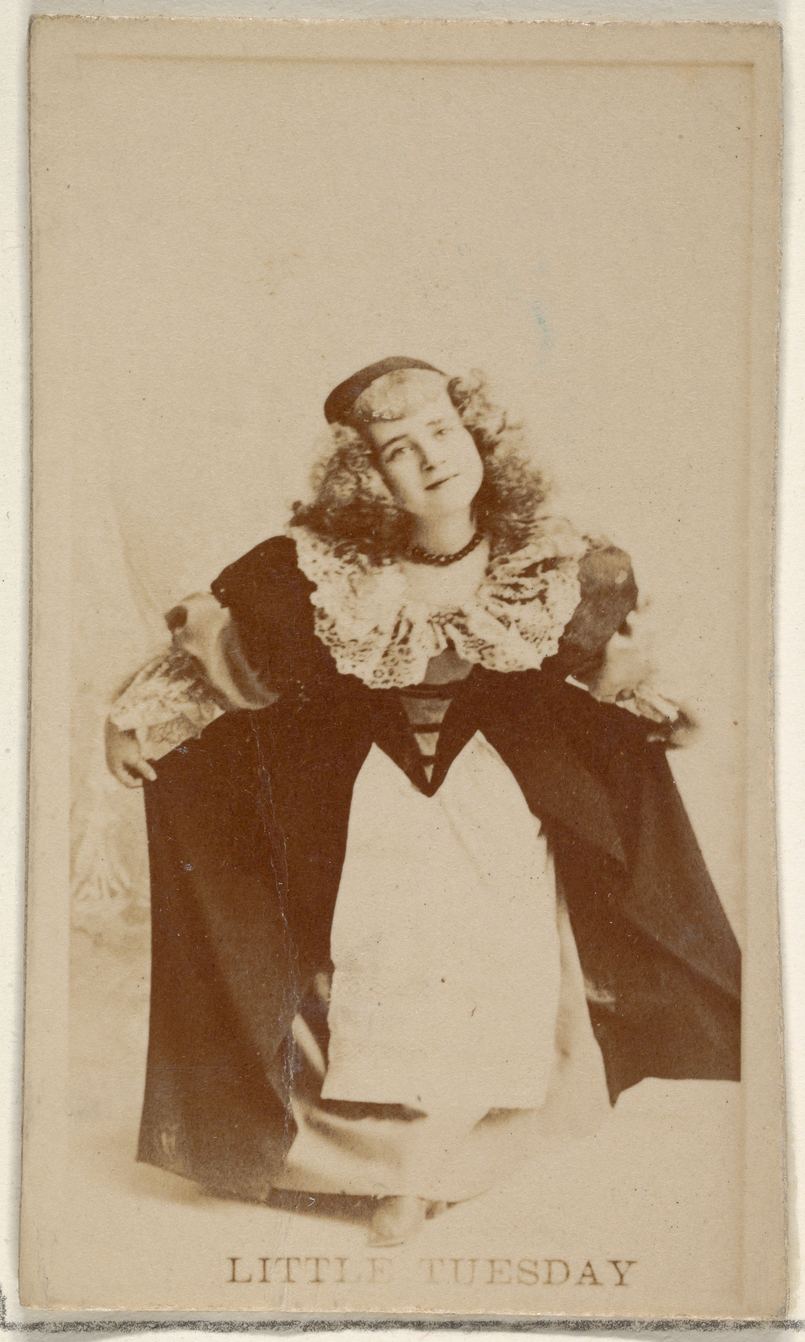
Little Tuesday, from the Actors and Actresses series (N45, Type 8) for Virginia Brights Cigarettes, ca. 1888, Metropolitan Museum of Art

Charlotte Selina Wood was allegedly born on a Tuesday morning (circa 1887) to Annetta Cobb and Harold George Wood, in Long Branch, New Jersey. Tuesday's uncle was playwright and actor Joseph Arthur, best known for his melodramatic plays such as Blue Jeans and The Still Alarm. The nickname "Little Tuesday" was reportedly given to her by Arthur because her parents could not immediately decide on a name for her.

She made her stage debut (playing a baby) in Helen's Inheritance at the Madison Square Theatre in late 1889. She also appeared a few times in Pine Meadow at the Fourteenth Street Theatre. On May 18, 1890, a benefit was held in her honor at the Star Theatre, reportedly earning several hundred dollars for her "maintenance and education." By the end of 1890, The New York Times was referring to her as a "remarkably clever child actress" and "a child of the most refreshing unconsciousness of her marvelous ability to entertain." She would not appear regularly in shows, but would put on private performances for the elite of New York, including the Astors, Vanderbilts, and Whitneys, and would also appear in charity performances.

From 1892-93, she joined a traveling production of The Still Alarm, and her appearances were warmly welcomed. She reportedly even visited the White House during this time. In New York, the New York Society for the Prevention of Cruelty to Children occasionally tried to interfere with her planned performances.

Tuesday's appearances, which had never been very frequent, dwindled after 1893 because she was going to school. In 1896 she debuted a one-act play called Beware, the Dog written by her uncle, and was reported to have "retired" from the stage later that year.

After her "retirement", Little Tuesday faded from public memory. She graduated from Convent of the Sacred Heart school in New York City in 1903, and married New York businessman George T. Zimmerman in 1915. In the late 1920s, she was reported to be serving as president of a women's club founded by her mother called "Theoria" which supported the theater.
