= Virginia Harned =

American stage actress (1867–1946)

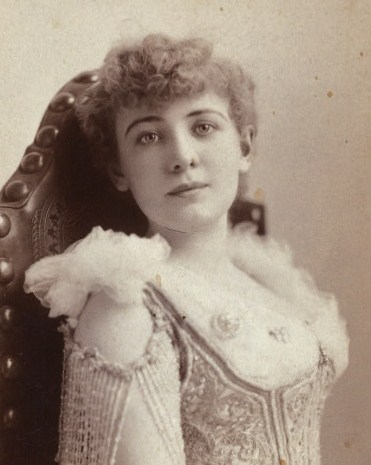
- Born: Cora Virginia Hickes; May 29, 1867; Boston, Massachusetts, US
- Died: April 29, 1946 (aged 78); New York City, US
- Occupation: Stage actress
- Years active: 188?–1936
- Spouse(s): Edward Hugh Sothern(1896–1910); William Courtenay

Cora Virginia Hicks, known by her stage name Virginia Harned, (May 29, 1867 – April 29, 1946) was an American stage actress active from the 1880s through the 1930s. She is mainly remembered for playing the title character in the 1895 world premiere of the play Trilby at the Boston Museum, and in its subsequent run on Broadway at the Garden Theatre. This play was based on the 1894 George du Maurier novel of the same name. She continued to work regularly on the stage into the late 1910s and thereafter appeared only periodically until as late as 1936. Her first husband was E. H. Sothern who later married Julia Marlowe, and her second husband was actor William Courtenay, who appeared on stage with her several times and who left her a widow in 1933.

== Life and career ==
The daughter of James J. and Nellie R. Hicks, Harned was born Cora Virginia Hicks in Boston, Massachusetts on May 29, 1867. (Note: Who Was Who in the Theatre, 1912-1976 states she was born on May 29, 1872. The Dramatic Index for 1914 gives the year as 1868. However, both dates are contradicted in primary documents. Her death record in the New York, New York, U.S., Index to Death Certificates, 1862-1948 gives her date of birth as May 29, 1867. This date matches her baptismal record from the City Mission Society of New York City when she was baptized at the age of 10.) She made her stage debut in the 1880s in a touring production of Leonard Grover's Our Boarding House. After this she joined the theater troupe of George Clarke with whom she performed in a production of Dion Boucicault's The Corsican Brothers. By 1888 she was touring on the stage under the name Virginia Harned as Nisbe in Augustine Daly's A Night Off in American regional theatre; a show performed by Daly's theatre troupe.

By September 1889 Harned had left Daly's troupe and was acting in Philadelphia at the Chestnut Street Opera House as Elinore Fordham in Joseph Arthur and A.C. Wheeler's The Still Alarm in a company led by Harry Lacy. She subsequently toured in this show to the National Theatre in Washington, D.C., the Academy of Music in Baltimore, the Bijou Theatre in Pittsburgh, the Grand Opera House in St. Louis, the Gillis Opera House in Kansas City, the Columbia Theatre in Chicago, and Henry C. Miner's Theater in Detroit. She was fired by Lacy in December 1899 which angered the playwright Joseph Arthur. Lacy and Arthur had a falling out over this event which caused the show to end its tour early.

In January 1890 Harned performed the role of Letty Fletcher in Henry Arthur Jones's Saints and Sinners at the Criterion Theatre in Brooklyn, New York. Later that year she starred as Florence Featherly in Sedley Brown's A Long Lane at the Fourteenth Street Theatre in Manhattan, and made her Broadway debut at Palmer's Theatre as Ellen Barrington in Charles Vincent and Louis Aldrich's The Editor. After this she was hired as the leading actress in Edward Hugh Sothern's theatre troupe with whom she performed for several years. She became romantically involved with Sothern, and they married in Philadelphia, Pennsylvania on December 2, 1896. Some of the plays she starred in with Sothern's company included The Master of Woodbarrow (1890, as Clara Dexter), The Dancing Girl (1891, as Drusilla Ives), Captain Lettarblair (1892, as Fanny Hadden), and An Enemy to the King (1896, as Julie de Varion); most of which were staged at the Lyceum Theatre in New York City.

Harned also spent time performing in A. M. Palmer's company prior to her marriage to Sothern. This included performances as Mrs Erlynne in Lady Windermere's Fan (1893), and a return to Palmer's Theatre on Broadway as Mrs. Sylvester in Sydney Grundy's The New Woman (1894) She also appeared with Palmer's company in the world premiere of Paul M. Potter's Trilby which was given at the Boston Museum on March 4, 1895. It subsequently transferred to Broadway's Garden Theatre later that year. The production was a critical triumph, and a major moment in Harned's career.

Harned's marriage to Sothern ended in divorce in 1910. Her second marriage to actor William Courtenay was announced to the public in March 1913 but according newspaper reports had occurred months earlier. They remained married until William's death in 1933. She continued to work on the stage regularly into the late 1910s. Some of her other Broadway credits included Spiritisme (1897, Knickerbocker Theatre; as Simone), Edmond Giraud's Anna Karenina (1907, Herald Square Theatre; as Anna), and Hermann Bahr's Josephine (1918, Knickerbocker Theatre). After a long absence from the New York stage she appeared as Hetty Cary in Jefferson Davis at the Biltmore Theatre in 1936; a production which toured in nationally under the sponsorship of the Federal Theatre Project.

Harned died on April 29, 1946 at her home in the Upper West Side of New York City at 344 W. 72nd St. She was 78 years old.
