= Harned =

Harned may refer to:

- Harned, Kentucky, an unincorporated community in Breckinridge County

== People with the surname ==
- Corey Harned, lacrosse player
- Richard Harned, kinetic sculptor and glass artist
- Virginia Harned, stage actress
