= EuDaly =

EuDaly is a surname. Notable people with the surname include:

- Kevin EuDaly, American author and publisher
- Sue EuDaly, character in Blue Jeans (1917 film)
