= The Still Alarm (1926 film) =

1926 film

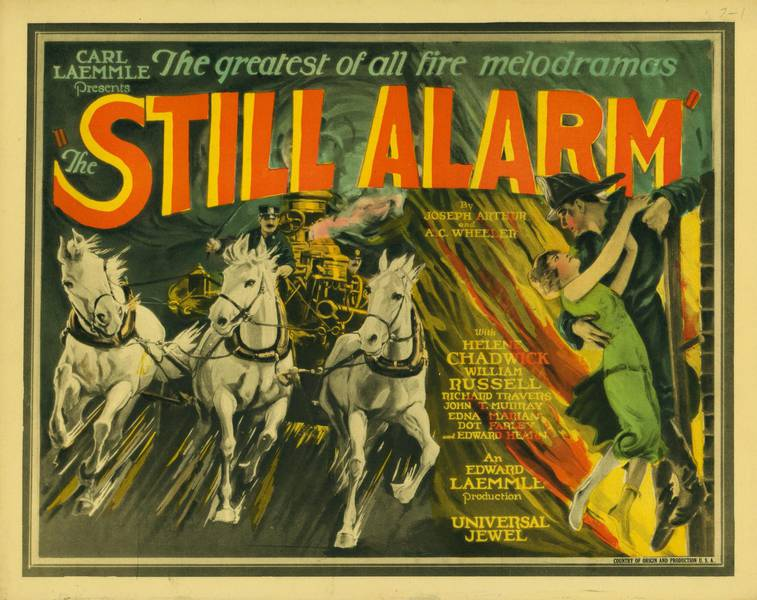
- Lobby card
- Directed by: Edward Laemmle
- Written by: Charles Kenyon; Harvey J. O'Higgins (adaptation)
- Based on: The Still Alarm by Joseph Arthur and A.C. Wheeler
- Produced by: Carl Laemmle
- Starring: Helene Chadwick; William Russell; Richard Travers
- Production company: Universal Pictures
- Distributed by: Universal Pictures
- Release date: May 2, 1926
- Running time: 7 reels
- Country: United States
- Languages: Silent; English intertitles

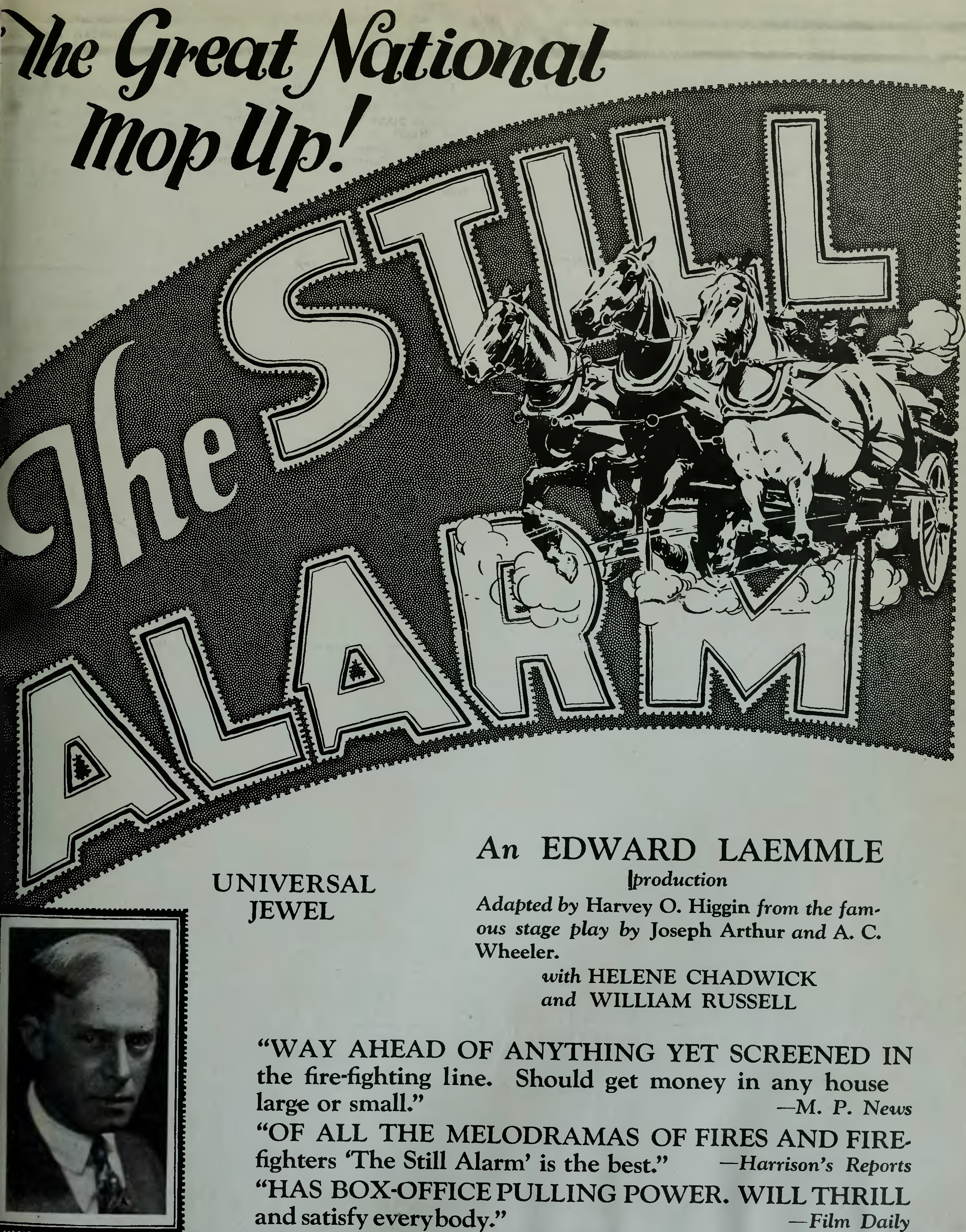
The Still Alarm advertisement in The Film Daily, 1926

The Still Alarm is a 1926 American silent drama film directed by Edward Laemmle and starring Helene Chadwick, William Russell, and Richard Travers, based on the 1887 play of the same name. The play had previously been adapted to film in 1918.

== Plot ==
As described in a film magazine review, Lucy leaves her husband, fireman Richard Fay, for the politician Perry Dunn. Eighteen years later, Dick is a fire battalion chief. His adopted daughter Drina meets the modeste Madame Celeste, who really is the missing Lucy. Dunn decoys Drina to his apartment. Fire breaks out and Dick and other firemen arrive. Dick discovers Drina in the building and rescues her. He then thrashes Dunn. Trapped in the flames, he lowers Dunn to safety. Dick and his men escape along a narrow cornice, pressed against the wall in single file, until out of the building. Drina is taken home by Lucy, and later a reconciliation follows.

== Cast ==
- Helene Chadwick as Lucy Fay
- William Russell as Richard Fay
- Richard Travers as Perry Dunn
- Edna Marion as Drina Fay
- Andy Todd as John T. Murray
- Guy Edward Hearn as Tom Brand
- Erin La Bissoniere as Masie Mush
- Dot Farley as Mrs. Maloney
- Jacques D'Auray as Manager of Modiste Shop
- Kasha Haroldi (uncredited)

== Preservation ==
A digital copy of The Still Alarm made from a complete 16mm print from the collection of a private collector is held by the Library of Congress.

== Bibliography ==
- Munden, Kenneth White. The American Film Institute Catalog of Motion Pictures Produced in the United States, Part 1. University of California Press, 1997.
