= The Social Pirate =

1919 film directed by Dell Henderson

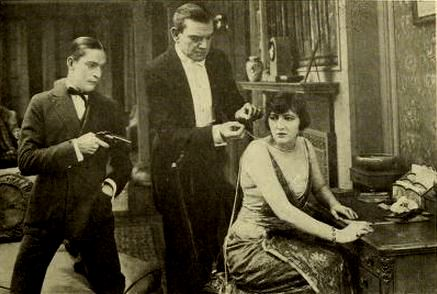
- Directed by: Dell Henderson
- Written by: Emil Forst
- Starring: June Elvidge; Laura Burt; Ned Sparks
- Cinematography: Philip Hatkin
- Production company: World Film
- Distributed by: World Film
- Release date: May 19, 1919
- Running time: 50 minutes
- Country: United States
- Languages: Silent; English intertitles

The Social Pirate is a 1919 American silent drama film directed by Dell Henderson, starring June Elvidge, Laura Burt, and Ned Sparks.

== Cast ==
- June Elvidge as Dolores Fernandez
- Laura Burt as Mrs. McBride
- Lillian Lawrence as Mrs. Ridgeway
- Winifred Leighton as Madge Ridgeway
- Alan Edwards as Bruce Ridgeway
- George MacQuarrie as Allen Hobington
- Ned Sparks as Harry Barnes
- May Hopkins as Ann Muller
- Philip Van Loan as Señor Valdez
- Alex Shannon as Bill Hoffman
- Bertram Marburgh as Detective Mills

== Bibliography ==
- Connelly, Robert B. The Silents: Silent Feature Films, 1910-36, Volume 40, Issue 2. December Press, 1998.
- Munden, Kenneth White. The American Film Institute Catalog of Motion Pictures Produced in the United States, Part 1. University of California Press, 1997.
