= Blue Jeans (1917 film) =

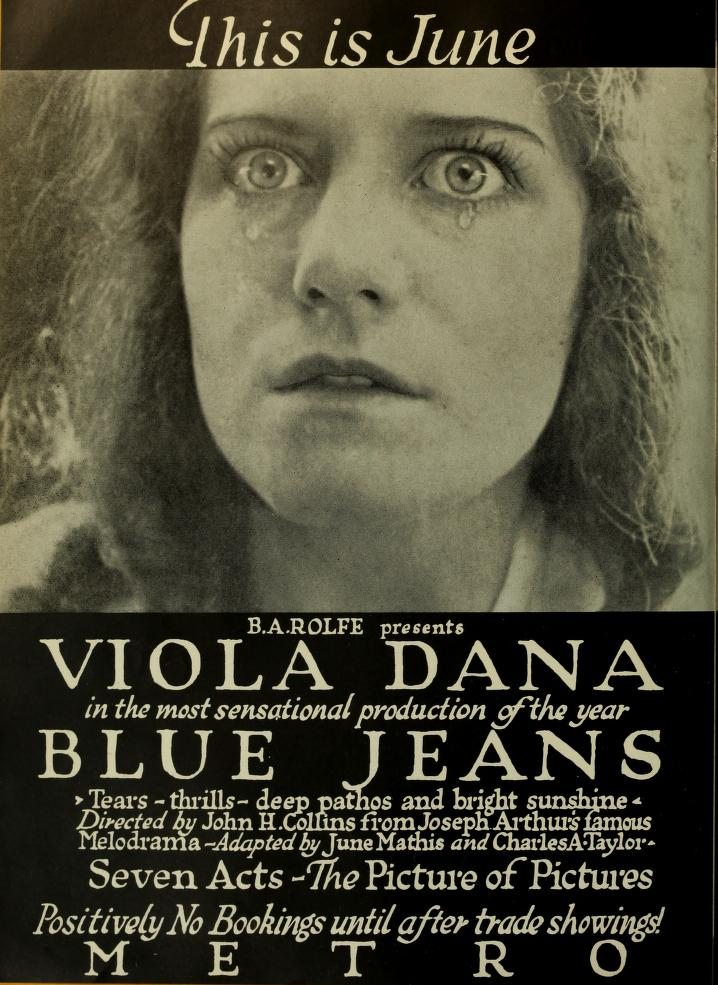
- Advertisement for film
- Directed by: John H. Collins
- Written by: June Mathis; Charles A. Taylor
- Based on: Blue Jeans by Joseph Arthur
- Cinematography: John Arnold; William H. Tuers
- Distributed by: Metro Pictures
- Release date: December 10, 1917
- Running time: 7 reels (approximately 70 minutes)
- Country: United States
- Language: Silent (English intertitles)

Blue Jeans is a 1917 American silent drama film, based on the 1890 play Blue Jeans by Joseph Arthur that opened in New York City to great popularity. The sensation of the play was a dramatic scene where the unconscious hero is placed on a board approaching a huge buzz saw in a sawmill, later imitated to the point of cliché.

Prints survive at several archives including the George Eastman Museum Motion Picture Collection.

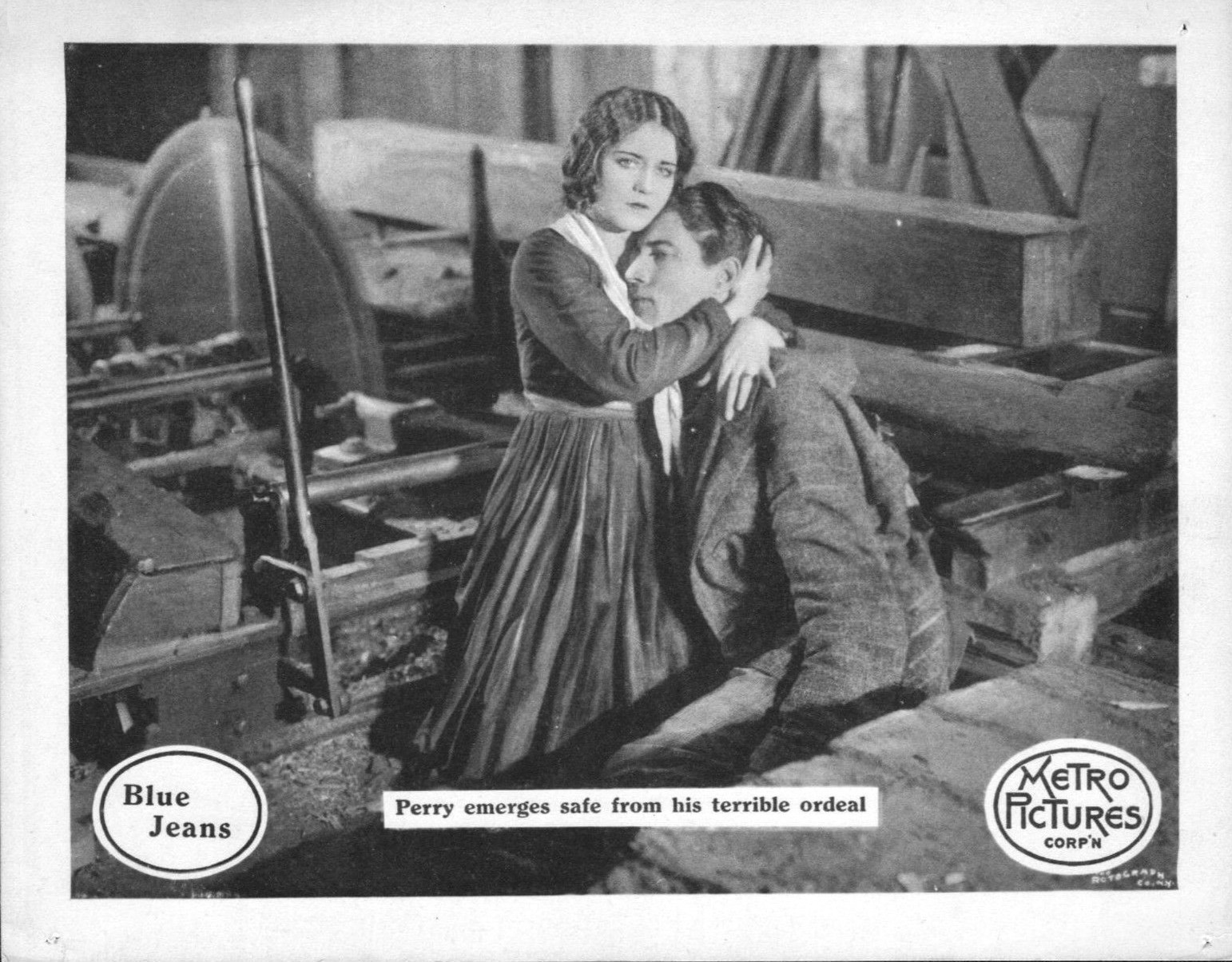
Lobby card

== Cast ==
- Viola Dana as June
- Robert D. Walker as Perry Bascom
- Sally Crute as Dora Eudaly
- Clifford Bruce as Ben Boone
- Henry Hallam as Colonel Henry Clay Risener
- Russell Simpson as Jacob Tutwiler
- Margaret McWade as Cindy Tutwiler
- Augustus Phillips as Jack Bascom

== Reception ==
Like many American films of the time, Blue Jeans was subject to cuts by city and state film censorship boards. For example, the Chicago Board of Censors required a cut of the intertitle "You have transgressed the moral law" etc., the starting of the saw and the laying of the man on the block before it, and three scenes of the man in front of the saw.
