= The Still Alarm (1918 film) =

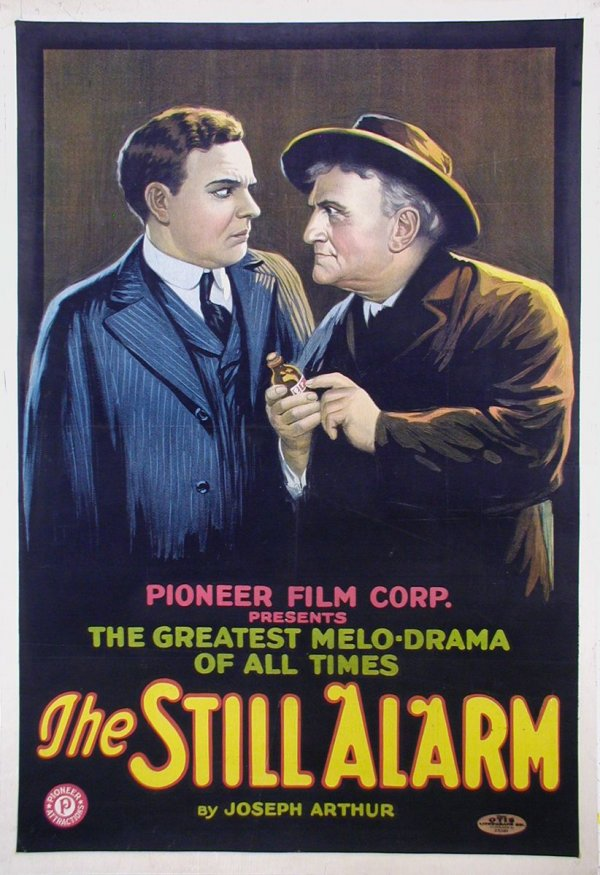
- Theatrical release poster
- Directed by: Colin Campbell
- Written by: Joseph Arthur (play); Colin Campbell
- Produced by: William Nicholas Selig
- Starring: Tom Santschi; Bessie Eyton; Eugenie Besserer
- Cinematography: Harry Neumann
- Production company: Selig Polyscope Company
- Distributed by: Pioneer Film Corporation
- Release date: July 1918
- Running time: 6 reels
- Country: United States
- Languages: Silent; English intertitles

The Still Alarm is a 1918 American silent drama film directed by Colin Campbell and starring Tom Santschi, Bessie Eyton, and Eugenie Besserer. It is an adaptation of the 1887 play The Still Alarm by Joseph Arthur.

== Cast ==
- Tom Santschi as Jack Manley
- Bessie Eyton as Eleanor Fordham
- Eugenie Besserer as Undetermined Role
- William Scott as Undetermined Role
- Fritzi Brunette as Undetermined Role

== Bibliography ==
- Donald W. McCaffrey & Christopher P. Jacobs. Guide to the Silent Years of American Cinema. Greenwood Publishing, 1999. ISBN 0-313-30345-2
