= Andrew Carpenter Wheeler =

American journalist (1835–1903)

Andrew Carpenter Wheeler ("Nym Crinkle")
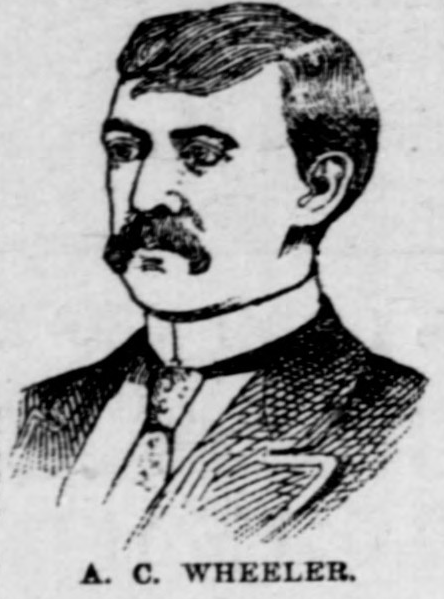
- Sketch of Wheeler circa 1891
- Born: July 4, 1835; New York City
- Died: March 10, 1903 (aged 67); Monsey, New York

Andrew Carpenter Wheeler (July 4, 1835 – March 10, 1903), best known by the pen name Nym Crinkle, was a 19th-century American newspaper writer, author, and drama critic. He was one of the most prolific critics of his day, known for his pungent and fierce criticism.

== Biography ==
=== Early life ===
Wheeler was born on John Street in Lower Manhattan (New York City) in 1835, and attended College of the City of New York. His journalism career started with The New York Times in 1857, before going west for a time. He joined the Milwaukee Sentinel, and left to become a war correspondent during the Civil War. After a stint in Chicago, he then returned to New York for the remainder of his career.

=== Critic ===
After returning to New York, he first wrote under the name "Trinculo" on general topics and as a drama critic for the New York Leader. He later moved to the New York World, where he adopted and popularized the "Nym Crinkle" name. He then moved to the Sun and then back to the World (in 1883), while also contributing to magazines. He also briefly was an editor at the New York Star in 1879, and then founded a paper in Tarrytown, New York, called the Sunnyside Press, which lasted less than a year. He worked into the 1890s before retiring. He also used the pseudonym "Feuilleton," and briefly published a journal called Nym Crinkle's Feuilleton.

As a drama critic, Wheeler was considered to be merciless. Theatre historian Thomas K. Wright wrote in 1972 that Wheeler's criticism was contradictory and his view of a work could change over time, perhaps because he enjoyed "polemics." Wright also concluded that Wheeler was "preoccupied, near obsessed, with masculinity," and "regarded his age as a decadent, effeminate time." Wright particularly favored Edwin Forrest, who once upbraided Wheeler for suggesting in a column that Forrest should retire before his powers declined. Wheeler disliked the celebrated Edwin Booth.

=== Other works ===
Wheeler also wrote a number of plays, including one called The Twins (1876) with Steele MacKaye, which was not a success. He collaborated with Edward Alfriend in The Great Diamond Robbery (1895).

Wheeler was also rumored to have written with (or for) Joseph Arthur the popular (but decidedly low-brow) hit plays The Still Alarm (1887) and Blue Jeans (1890). These credits were the subject of some controversy at the time. Arthur reportedly credited Wheeler as his collaborator on The Still Alarm on its opening night, and he is formally credited as a co-writer of the play in its 1926 silent film version. Whether Wheeler had a hand in writing Blue Jeans is murkier; he formally denied writing it, but also later claimed his denial was untrue. Writer Edward Eggleston also asserted that Blue Jeans' story was largely stolen from one of his own novels.

Other Wheeler works included The Toltec Cup, The Chronicles of Milwaukee (a history of Milwaukee published early in his career), Easter in a Hospital Bed, and The Primrose Path of Dalliance.

=== Later career and death ===
Late in his life, when he had substantially departed the critic's field, Wheeler adopted the new pen name "J.P.M." or "J.P. Mowbray", adopted from the name of his second wife, Jennie Pearl Mowbray, whom he married in 1892 following the death of his first wife in 1889. That pseudonym appeared on letters he originally published in the Evening Post, and later in book form as A Journey to Nature (1901). He published a total of four books under that name, and J.P.M.'s real identity was the subject of some speculation but not known until after Wheeler's death.

Wheeler died of apoplexy on March 10, 1903, at his home in Monsey, New York, and was buried in the churchyard of the Old Dutch Church of Sleepy Hollow. He was survived by his second wife, and three children.

== Bibliography ==
=== Plays ===
- The Twins (1876) with Steele MacKaye. Starred Lester Wallack, but only ran 10 days.
- Big Pony, or The Gentlemanly Savage (1877) with Edward J. Darling. Starred Nat Goodwin, but was not a success.
- Jack Royal of the 92nd (1891). Starred Harry Lacy, who made his career in The Still Alarm.
- The Great Diamond Robbery (1895) with Edward Alfriend. Starred Fanny Janauschek.

=== Short stories ===
- 'Eight Minutes of Three. A detective story' (1895) (as Nym Crynkle) in The Illustrated London News, Summer Number 1895, pp. 31–38.

=== Books ===
- The Chronicles of Milwaukee (1861) (as A.C. Wheeler, non-fiction, history of Milwaukee)
- Iron Trail (1876) (as Wheeler / Crinkle)
- The Toltec Cup (novel) (Lew Vanderpoole Publishing Co., 1890) (as Wheeler / Crinkle)
- The Primrose Path of Dalliance (1892) (as Wheeler / Crinkle)
- A Journey to Nature (1901) (as J.P. Mowbray)
- The Making of a Country Home (1902) (as J.P. Mowbray)
- Tangled Up in Beulah Land (1902) (as J.P. Mowbray)
- The Conquering of Kate (1903) (as J.P. Mowbray)
