= Lew Vanderpoole =

American writer and publisher, literary forger

Lew Vanderpoole (born about 1855 - ?) was an American writer and publisher, best known for a series of forgeries he produced in the 1880s.

== Biography ==
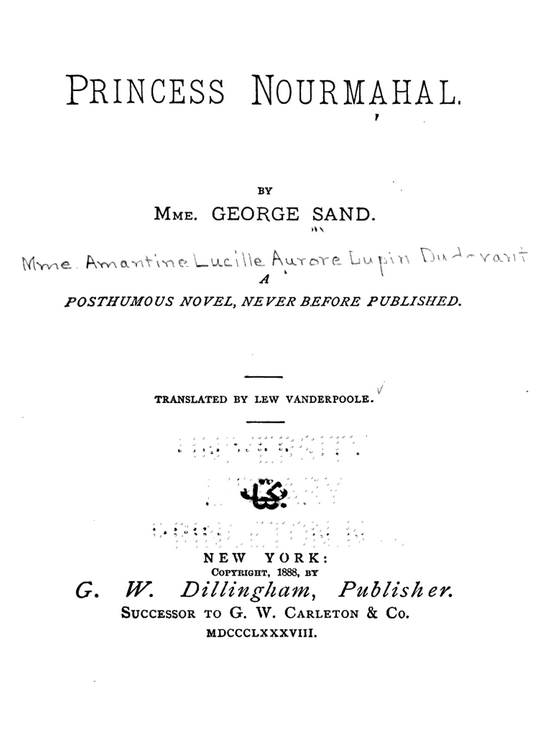
Title page of Princess Nourmahal, which Vanderpoole claimed was written by George Sand.

Little is known about Vanderpoole's life outside of his literary misadventures. When the George Sand forgeries were exposed in September 1887, the New York Sun reported that Vanderpoole claimed to be 32 years old, and had a "somewhat Irish cast of features." He had slight stutter but was a "glib, plausible talker." He was reported to have been with the New York Tribune at one point, and then was "exchange editor" for the New York World, and was considered a "fairly good descriptive writer, and a man of some attainments." Due to poor health, he dropped out of newspaper work around 1884, and probably concocted his schemes after that due to his financial circumstances. When arrested in September 1887, he was living in Oyster Bay outside New York City.

Papers in upstate New York reported, when Vanderpoole was otherwise in the news, that he had been a resident of Columbia County, New York and was "well known in Hudson by reason of his many bold adventures." It appears he was then known as "C.L. Vanderpoel" or "Charles L. Vanderpool" of the town of Kinderhook. This indeed appears to be the same person. He married Rosa Vosburgh of Kinderhook in 1881. The New York World reported that the couple had three children, and divorced in 1894, whereupon his wife reportedly stated "I don't like my husband. I am tired of him, but I have been faithful to him with but two exceptions." In 1890, he was reported to be connected with the Troy Times.

== George Sand forgeries ==
Vanderpoole claimed French writer George Sand (Amantine Lucile Dupin), who died in 1876, was his aunt or great-aunt. He was arrested on charges of forgery in September 1887, after selling a story called Princess Nourmahal to Cosmopolitan which he attributed to Sand. When confronted with the fact that he could not produce the original manuscript of Nourmahal which he claimed to have translated, he confessed that he had a phenomenal memory and had translated it from memory. Yet, he appeared to be unfamiliar with French when questioned in that language. The New York Times review of Nourmahal rejected the idea that Sand could possibly be the author of the work. Vanderpoole denied that the work was a forgery. Vanderpoole spent a few days in jail, but was released on the argument that the case needed to be brought in New York City, not Oyster Bay. Some in the press did not treat Vanderpoole's offense as so great, and hoped he would move on to simply write under his own name. But Normahal book was still published in 1888 as the claimed work of Sand.

== Interview with King Ludwig ==
PDF of Ludwig article in Lippincott's.

In November 1886, an alleged interview that Vanderpoole did with King Ludwig II of Bavaria a few years prior was published in Lippincott's Monthly Magazine. The interview was published a few months after Ludwig's death, and has been frequently cited and relied upon by German writers. German scholars appear to have been unaware until 2017 of the other forgery charges that had been brought against Vanderpoole, and too willing to accept the "too good to be true" article with fascinating insights into Ludwig, including Ludwig's claimed adoration of Edgar Allan Poe. Vanderpoole even appears as an important character in the German musical "Ludwig²" (2005).

The New York Sun did report in September 1887 that the Ludwig article was "an extremely interesting interview" which Vanderpoole claimed to have gotten through alleged connections with French newspaper Le Figaro, with which he actually had no connection. The Sun reported that Vanderpoole "has told several publishers that he was on intimate terms with Victor Hugo, George Eliot, Gladstone, Boulanger, Zola, Thomas Carlyle, Rubenstein, Bismarck, Sara Bernhardt, Tennyson, Ruskin, and Thiers."

== Other events ==
Vanderpoole also passed off the novel Ruhainah (1886) by Rev. T.P. Hughes (pseudonym Evan Stanton) as his own work, among other items.

Lippincott's published the novel The Red Mountain Mines, which was attributed to Vanderpoole himself, in its September 1887 issue.

Vanderpoole was arrested in London in August 1894, after attempting to borrow 1,000 pounds from Charles Russell, the son of the Lord Chief Justice.

== Publishing company ==
From 1890 to 1892, Vanderpoole published a number of books with the "Lew Vanderpoole Publishing Co." Its published books (many if not all appear to be soft cover books) included "The Toltec Cup" (1890) and "The Primrose Path of Dalliance" (1892) by Andrew Carpenter Wheeler; "Eteocles: a Tale of Antioch" (1890) by Jessie Agnes Andrews (an author claimed to be 13 years old), "The Magnet of Death" (1890) by Vanderpoole, "Seemingly" (1890) by Caroline Washburn Rockwood and Vanderpoole, and "A Saratoga Romance" by Rockwood.

== Bibliography ==
Roger, Luc-Henri, Les impostures littéraires de Lew Vanderpoole: George Sand et Louis II de Bavière, BoD, 2022, ISBN 978-2322389919, 234 pp. (French and English text.)
