= Blue Jeans (play) =

1890 melodramatic play by Joseph Arthur

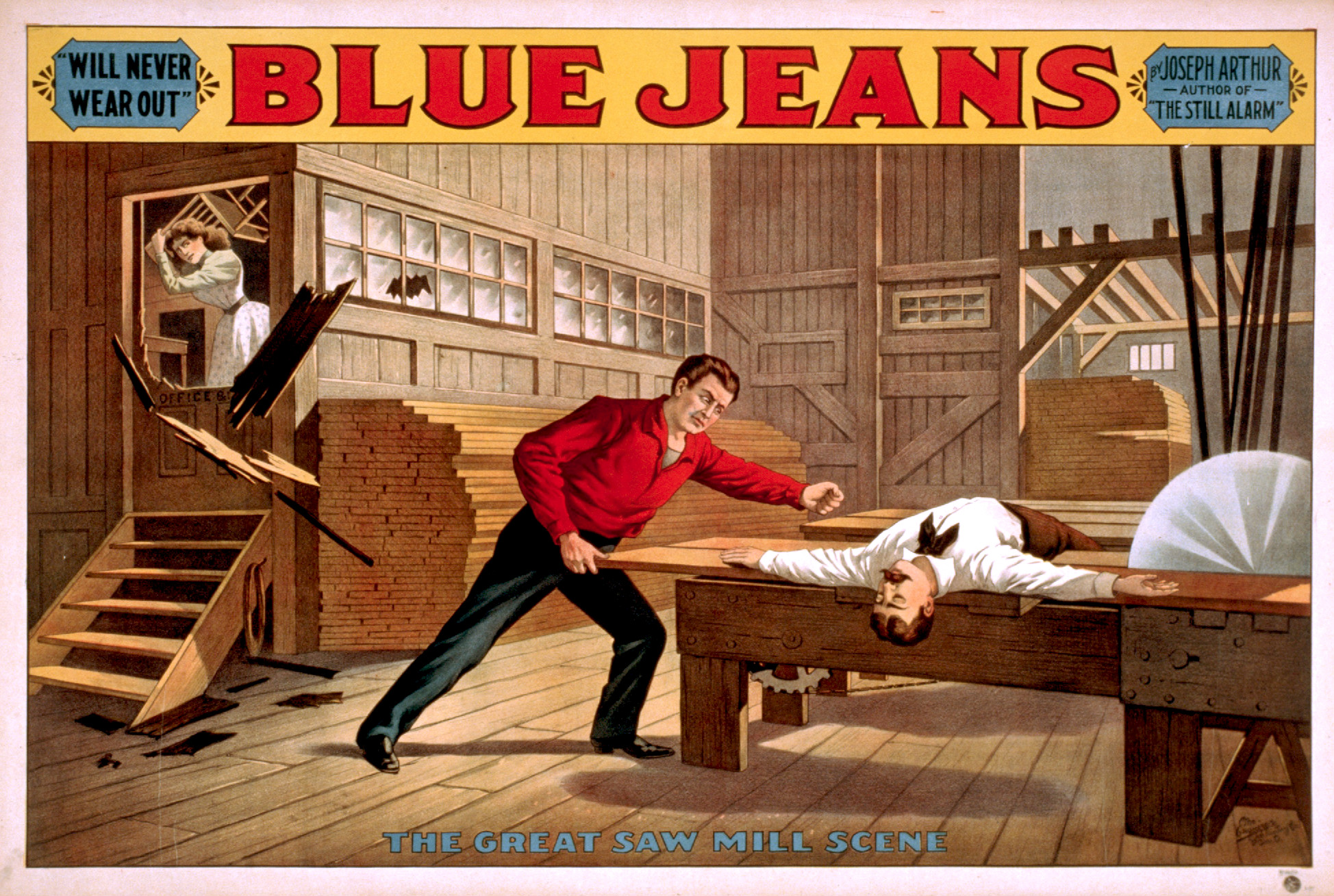
- 1899 poster depicting the famous saw mill scene from Blue Jeans
- Written by: Joseph Arthur
- Original language: English
- Genre: Drama
- Setting: Indiana, USA

Premiere
- Date premiered: October 6, 1890 (New York); 1898 (London)
- Place premiered: Fourteenth Street Theatre, New York City

Blue Jeans is a melodramatic play by Joseph Arthur that opened in New York City in 1890 to great popularity. The sensation of the play is a scene where the unconscious hero is placed on a board approaching a huge buzz saw in a sawmill, which became one of the most imitated dramatic scenes (eventually to the point of cliche and parody). The play remained popular for decades and was made into a successful silent film in 1917, also named Blue Jeans.

== Background ==
The play made its debut on October 6, 1890, at the Fourteenth Street Theatre. The original New York run of the play ran through March 7, 1891. The play enjoyed considerable success around the United States and in revivals in the following decades. It debuted in London in 1898.

It was rumored that theatre critic Andrew Carpenter Wheeler, known as "Nym Crinkle," was the actual author or co-author of Blue Jeans, as well as Arthur's prior hit The Still Alarm.

== 1917 film ==
A silent film version of the play was released in December 1917, and was also quite popular, starring Viola Dana as June and Robert D. Walker as Bascom.

== Plot ==
Perry Bascom returns home to Rising Sun, Indiana to make a run for Congress, and marry Sue Eudaly. Sue's ex, Ben Boone, is nonplussed at this turn of events, and successfully runs for office against Bascom. Bascom later sours on Sue, and divorces her to marry June. After various twists, Boone corners June and Bascom at Bascom's sawmill. After knocking Bascom out, Boone places him on a board approaching a huge buzz saw. June, locked in an office, escapes just in time to save Bascom from certain death.

== Broadway cast ==
The initial Broadway cast (October 1890) included:

- Robert C. Hilliard as Perry Bascom
- George D. Chaplin as Col. Henry Clay Risener
- J.J. Wallace as Jacob Tutewiler
- Jacques Kruger as Jim Tutewiler
- W.J. Wheeler as Isaac Hankins
- Alice Leigh as Cindy Tutewiler
- Marian Mourdant Strickland as Samanthe Hinkins
- Laura Burt as Nell Tutewiler and Baleena Kicker
- Gracie Sherwood as Bascom's child
- George Fawcett as Ben Boone
- Ben Deane as Seth Igoe
- Jennie Yeamans as June
- Judith Berolde as Sue Eudaly
