= Laura Burt =

American actress

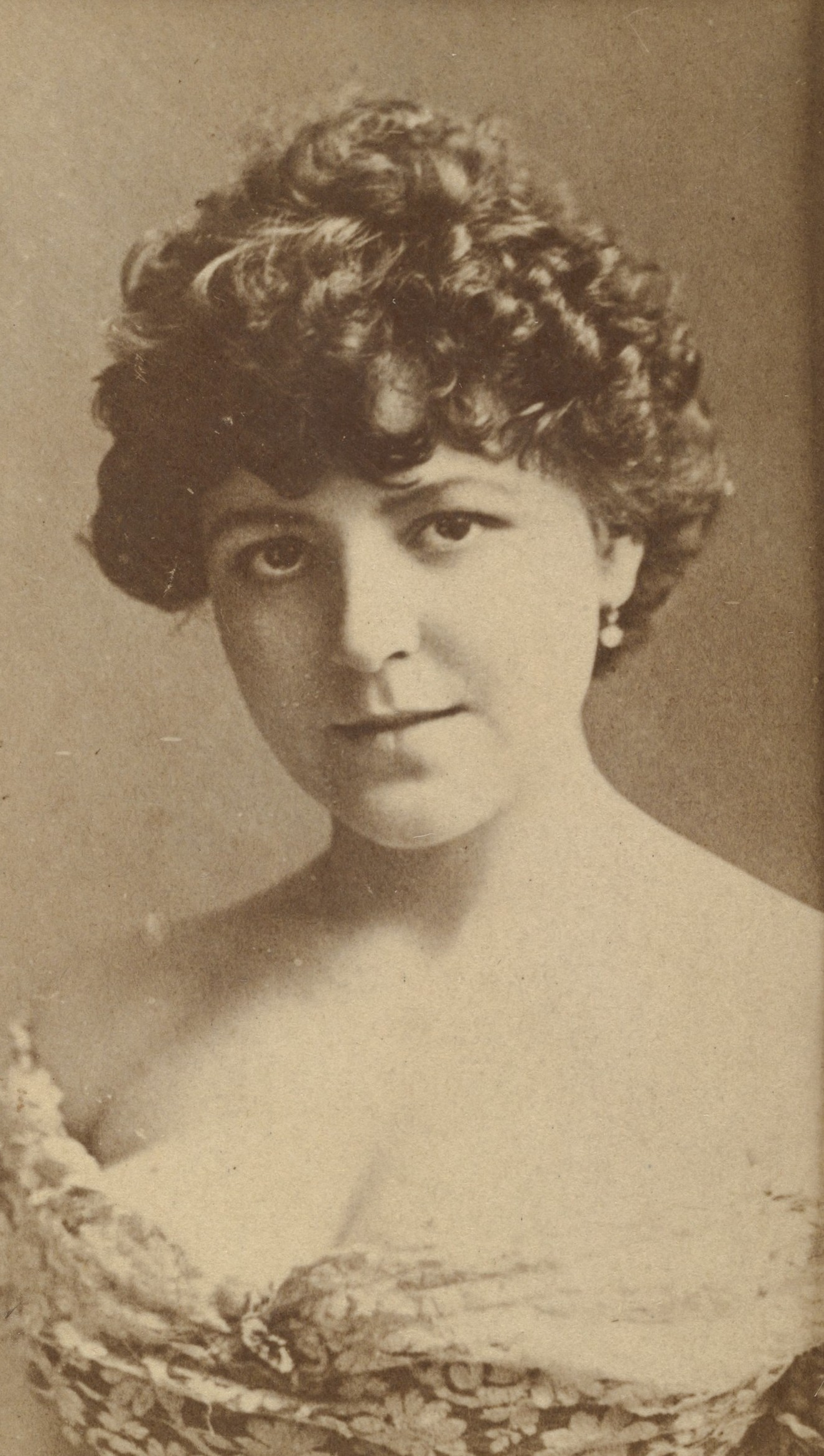
Laura Burt

Laura Burt (September 16, 1872 - October 16, 1952) was a British-born actress known for her American and English stage performances.

Burt was born on the Isle of Man on September 16, 1872, and her family soon emigrated to the United States. Her mother was a temperance movement activist.

Burt first drew attention for her stage performances in the hit 1890 play Blue Jeans. Another of her most famous performances was as Madge in In Old Kentucky.

She married British actor Henry Stanford on March 2, 1902, and they performed together in some cases until Stanford's death in 1921.
