= Richard Harned =

American kinetic sculptor and glass artist

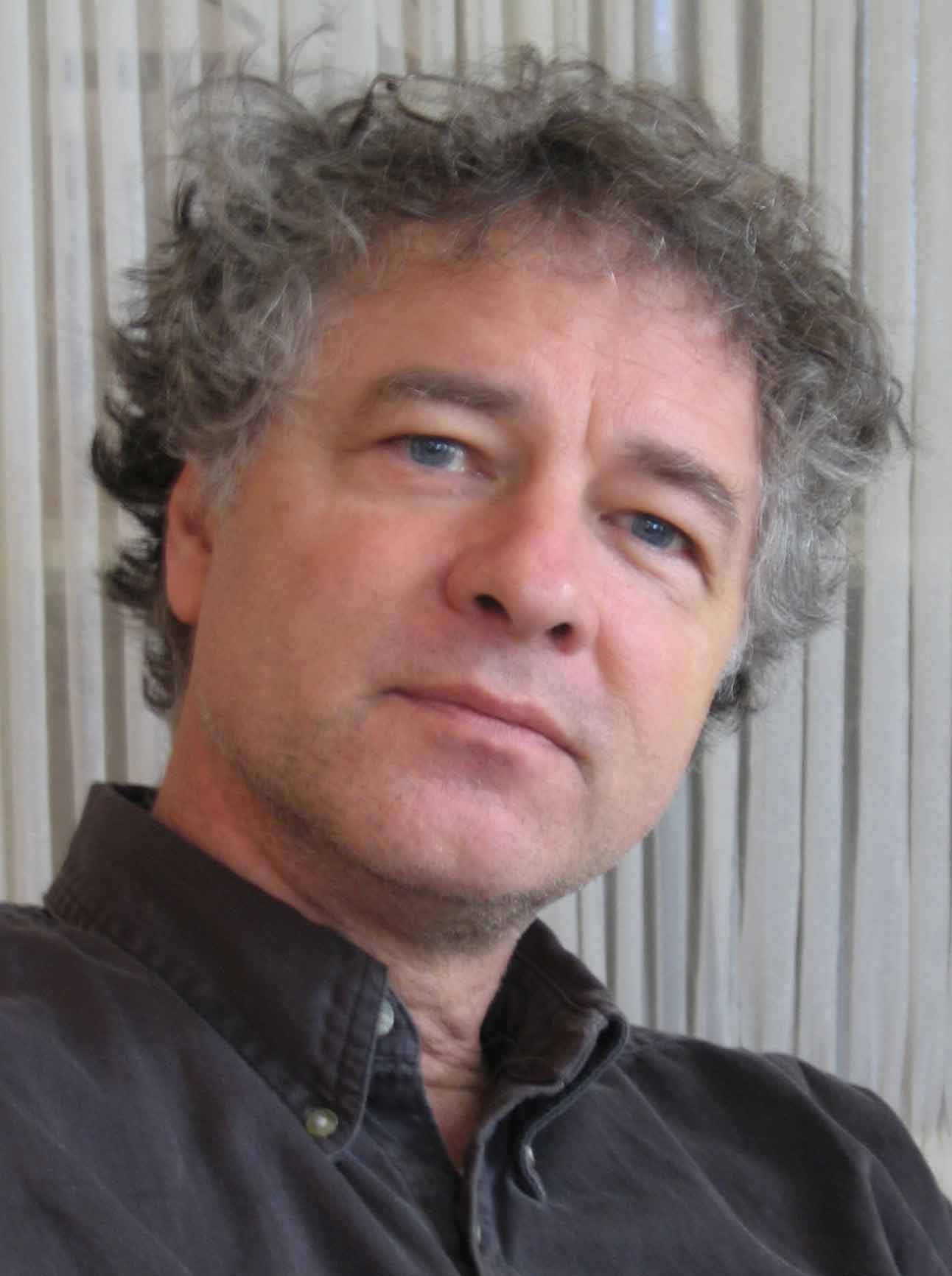
- Born: May 3, 1951 (age 75)
- Education: Rhode Island School of Design
- Known for: Sculpture

Corning Museum

Richard Harned (born 1951) is an American contemporary kinetic sculptor and glass artist. Harned trained under Dale Chihuly in the 1970s at the Rhode Island School of Design (RISD) with a pantheon of other artists of the American Glass Movement, among them Dan Dailey, Bruce Chao, Ben Moore, and Richard Yelle. He established the Abstract Glass Studio in Providence, Rhode Island (1974-76), returned to RISD to earn an MFA (1976-1978), and subsequently taught glass art and sculpture at the University of Tennessee, Arkansas State University in Jonesboro, replaced Chihuly as Department Head at RISD for two years, and in 1982, joined the faculty of Ohio State University, where he is currently Emeritus Professor.

== Artwork ==
Harned’s work has evolved from small utilitarian pieces and abstract glass objectsCorning Museum to room-sized kinetic sculptures built to explore the use of light, movement, and technology in art Westin Gallery . His message is about the connection of ideas to the dynamism and scale of the physical world. His sculpture combines the aesthetic beauty of glass with the drama of complex constructions, embellished with decorative and symbolic elements. His pieces are often presented with a humorous post-modern warning about technology’s impact.

The kinematic works of the 1980s and 1990s were built with elements of welded steel, often combined with neon lighting and glass, rotating television monitors, computers, and globes. He floated neon and fluorescent light sculptures in water, combining the natural reflection of water with the glow of artificial light, and the unnatural mix of electricity and water. Currently, he is working with fused glass, pressed glass, and printmaking.

== Affiliations ==
Harned has been an important artist of American Glass movement starting in the 1970s. He founded and directed the Glass Axis workshop, (now the Columbus Glass Art Center), an organization to promote glass art in Columbus, Ohio. He served as president of the Glass Art Society, (1987–1988) and Treasurer (1989), a professional association for the advancement of glass art worldwide. He has worked and taught at the Pilchuck School in Washington, which was established by Dale Chihuly as an international school for glass artists. He has also been a visiting artist in the Netherlands, Japan, Germany, and Turkey.

== Chronology of major works and events ==
- 1982: “Being of Light” — Fluorescent lights, plastic, wood. Kerr Lake, Virginia.
- 1985: “Purple Room” — Colored glass sheets, neon, blown glass, and steel.
- 1986: “Treadmill” — Ultraviolet lamps, motor, steel and mirrors. Visual Art Association, Louisville, Kentucky. 12 ft (3.7 m). height, 9 ft (2.7 m). wide, 9 ft (2.7 m). depth.
- 1987: “Wink-O-Matic Deluxe” (with Tom Kreager) — Steel, neon, and animation. Rochester Institute of Technology. 12 ft (3.7 m). height, 64 ft (20 m). length, 6 ft (1.8 m). depth.
- 1987: “Drum/Sphere” — motorized steel and neon, Rochester Institute of Technology. 12 ft (3.7 m). height, 22 ft (6.7 m). width, 12 ft (3.7 m). depth
- 1988: “Kinesthetic Refuge” — neon lights, electric motors, steel. Akron Art Museum. 9 ft (2.7 m). height, 34 ft (10 m). width, 6 ft (1.8 m). depth.
- 1988: “Cube” — neon, plastic. Columbus, Ohio.
- 1989: “Red Axis” — Blown glass, painted steel wall relief sculpture.
- 1989: “God’s Eye” — Neon and colored sheet glass.
- 1990: “Ghosts of Japan” — light sculpture for the theatrical production, Dallas Children's Theater in Dallas.
- 1990: “Night Sky—Sun in Taurus” — Steel, bowling balls, solar cells, lights. Heritage Village Sculpture on the Riverfront Arts Festival, State Department Building, Columbus, Ohio.
- 1991: “Eccentric Vision” — Steel gazebo, globes, video monitors, light bulbs. Glassworks, Renwick Gallery, Smithsonian American Art Museum, Washington, DC.
- 1991: “Oracle” — Painted steel, glass, mirror, magnets, TV cameras, visual telephone, speakers. Wexner Center for the Arts, Columbus, Ohio.
- 1991: “Glass Eats Light” — Steel, globes, TV Monitors, NSOGW Gallery, New Orleans, Louisiana.
- 1996: “Three Phoites of Light” — University of Wisconsin–Madison.
- 1998: Seto, Japan, sculpture and workshop. Aichi University, Glass Art Society.
- 1998: Haystack Mountain School of Crafts, teaching appointment. Deer Isle, Maine.
- 2001: “Expansions I” — Wexner Center for the Arts, Columbus, Ohio.
- 2004: “ How Nature Works” (with Xan Palay) Steel globes, bowling balls.
