= Harry Lacy =

American actor (1853–1920)

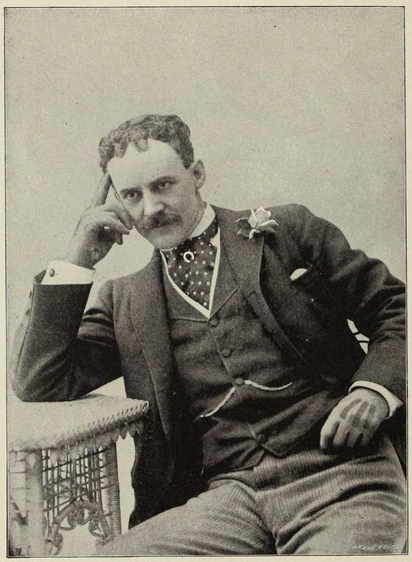
- Lacy circa 1894
- Born: 1853; Ohio
- Died: December 14, 1920 (aged 66–67)

Elanson Henry Lacy, known as Harry Lacy (1853 – December 14, 1920) was an American actor, a star in his time best known for playing the role of Jack Manley in the hit play The Still Alarm in the 1880s and 1890s. By 1901, it was reported that Lacy had played the part of Manley in over 1800 performances.

Lacy was born to Alonzo and Sarah C. Lazy in Ohio around 1853. He was acting at least as early at 1873, when he appeared in a minstrel show. One of his early stage successes was in the play The Planter's Wife playing opposite Maude Granger in 1883, and later Emily Rigl.

His wife Katherine Crittendon, whom he married around 1881, died in New York on May 9, 1907. Lacy died in California on December 14, 1920.

== Select performances ==
- The Planter's Wife (1883) as Albert Graham
- The Still Alarm (1887) as Jack Manley
- Jack Royal of the 92nd (1891) (play by Andrew Carpenter Wheeler)
- The Man From the West (1894) (adapted from novel by David Law Proudfit)
- Bob Rackett's Pajamas (1898) (one-act piece)
