= Kevin EuDaly =

American author

Kevin EuDaly is an American author and publisher of railroad related material including magazines, books, prints, photographs, flyers, and advertising. In 1992 he founded White River Productions, which has since become a leading publisher of railroad historical society magazines as well as definitive volumes on the Missouri Pacific, New Haven Railroad, Illinois Traction and others. EuDaly has also directed independent documentaries, including Twilight on the Rails.

Kevin EuDaly earned a Bachelor of Science Degree in Environmental Chemistry in 1982 from Southwest Missouri State University in Springfield, Missouri where he minored in Business and Biology.

His edited books include The Complete Book of North American Railroading (2009).
