= The Still Alarm =

Play by Joseph Arthur

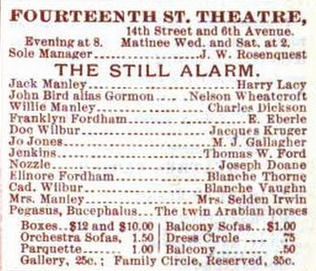
- Original cast advertisement
- Original language: English
- Written by: Joseph Arthur, A.C. Wheeler
- Genre: Melodrama

Premiere
- Date: 30 September 1887
- Place: Fourteenth Street Theatre, New York

The Still Alarm is a melodramatic play by Joseph Arthur and A.C. Wheeler that debuted in New York in 1887 and enjoyed great success, and was adapted to silent films in 1911, 1918, and 1926. Though never a favorite of critics, it achieved widespread popularity. It is best known for its climactic scene where fire wagons are pulled by horses to a blazing fire.

== Background ==
The play debuted at the Fourteenth Street Theatre in New York City on August 30, 1887. Harry Lacy played the lead role of Jack Manley.

Though it ran only a few weeks in its initial engagement, the play returned in March 1888 and ran for over 100 more performances. Its popularity was then well-secured. In September 1889, it re-appeared at the Grand Opera House. It ran again at the Fourteenth for two weeks in 1891, and returned to the Grand Opera House in 1892.

The play was also successful in England, and ran for 100 nights at the Princess's Theatre in London in 1888.

Critics noted its success with guarded bemusement. An August 1888 note on its London success reported that "the critics have come down rather severely on "The Still Alarm", but as this was not unexpected, the management does not worry. Meanwhile, Bucephalus and Pegasus, the two horses, have made a tremendous hit, and are drawing crowded houses. Next to them in order of merit, according to the critics, comes the dog."

The Still Alarm was Joseph Arthur's first successful creation, but he enjoyed similar success with more melodramatic fare including Blue Jeans (1890) and The Cherry Pickers (1896).

On opening night of the play, Arthur announced for the first time that theatre critic Andrew Carpenter Wheeler, known as "Nym Crinkle," was his collaborator. Wheeler received a writing credit on the 1926 film version.

== Original New York cast ==
- Jack Manley by Harry Lacy
- John Bird alia Gorman by Nelson Wheatcroft
- Willie Manley by Charles Dickson
- Franklyn Fordham by Eugene A. Eberle
- Doc Wilbur by Jacques Kruger
- Jenkins by Thomas W. Ford
- Nozzle by Joseph Doane
- Elinore Fordham by Blanche Thorne
- Cad. Wilbur by Blanche Vaughn
- Mrs. Manley by Mrs. Selden Irwin
- Pegasus, Bucephalaus – The Twin Arabian horses

== Film adaptations ==
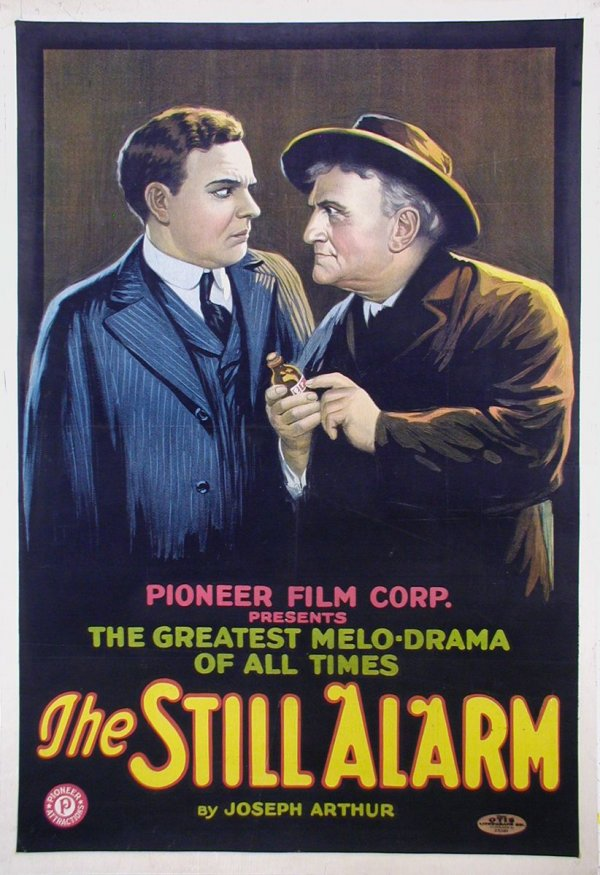
Film poster for 1918 silent film version of The Still Alarm

The Still Alarm has been adapted to silent film three times, in 1911, 1918, and 1926.

A 1911 film version was directed by Francis Boggs and starred Robert Z. Leonard, Herbert Rawlinson, and Al Ernest Garcia. William Selig produced the film, which has been preserved by the Museum of Modern Art Department of Film.

Selig produced a wholly new film version in 1918. This version starred Tom Santschi, Fritzi Brunette, and Bessie Eyton, directed by Colin Campbell, and distributed by Pioneer Film Corporation.

The final silent film version of the film, from Universal, was released in 1926. It starred Helene Chadwick, William Russell, and Richard Travers, and was directed by Edward Laemmle. Film archivist William K. Everson reviewed the film positively in 1956, noting that though it has "no reputation and is little known", it is "one of the very best" of the "fire-fighting thrillers" popular in the 1920s.

== Unrelated "Still Alarm" titles ==
A 1903 Edison short called The Still Alarm consists of footage of moving New York fire equipment and is not a film adaptation of the play.

A 1930 Vitaphone short of the same title is a comedy skit by George S. Kaufman, where Fred Allen and Harold Moffet debate what to wear before exiting a burning hotel, later joined by similarly blase firemen, who play the violin. The sketch comes from The Little Show, a revue that opened on Broadway in 1929.

== Legacy ==
Despite its roaring success as a play in New York, London and elsewhere, including repeated revivals and local productions mounted for many years, the sensationalistic fame of The Still Alarm eventually had to ebb. In 1920, a feature in the New York Tribune about the phasing out of the use of horses for fire fighting still highlighted The Still Alarm as the quintessential firefighting example. But Everson's observation in 1956 that it has "no reputation and is little known" (though he was only referring to the 1926 film version) fairly characterizes its lack of long-term staying power.
