= Joseph Arthur (playwright) =

American playwright

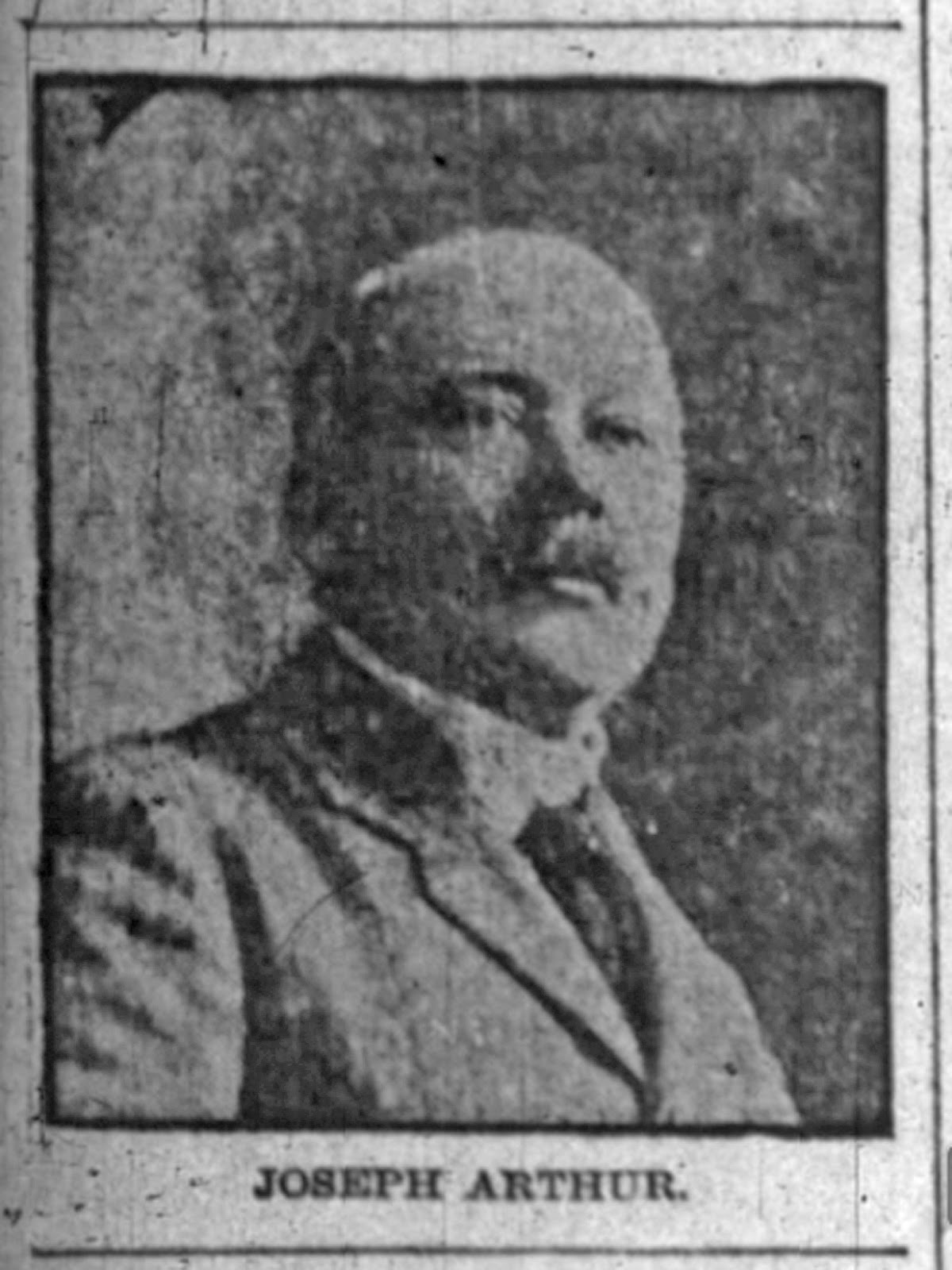
- Born: 1848; Centerville, Indiana
- Died: February 20, 1906 (aged 57–58)
- Spouse: Charlotte Cobb
- Parent(s): John C. and Margaret Hill Smith

Joseph Arthur (1848 – February 20, 1906) was an American playwright best known for his popular (though not critically acclaimed) melodramatic plays of the 1880s and 1890s, including The Still Alarm (1887) and Blue Jeans (1890).

== Biography ==
Arthur was born to John C. and Margaret Hill Smith in Centerville, Indiana in 1848 as Arthur Hill Smith. Most of his life was spent in New York City, where he arrived by the 1870s, but many of his plays took Indiana as their setting.

His first successful play was The Still Alarm, which opened in New York City in August 1887 and wowed audiences with its climactic scene where fire wagons are pulled by horses to a blazing fire. In 1890, he followed up that success with Blue Jeans, a huge melodramatic success of its time, best known for its scene where the unconscious hero is placed on a board approaching a huge buzz saw in a sawmill.

== Personal ==
Arthur married actress Charlotte Cobb.

== Works ==
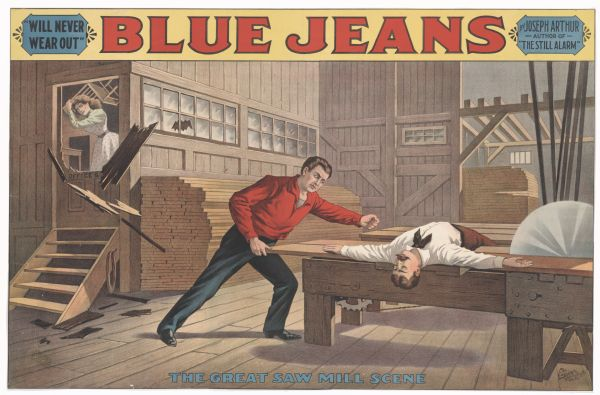
Poster for "Blue Jeans," 1890.

- Colorado (1875)
- The Still Alarm (1887)
- Blue Jeans (1890)
- The Corn Cracker (1893)
- The Cherry Pickers (1896)
- The Salt of the Earth (1898)
- On the Wabash (1899)
- Lost River (1900)
