= Dover Road =

Dover Road may refer to:

- The former name of A2 road (Great Britain)
- Dover Road (Reisterstown), a road in Reisterstown, Maryland
- A road in Dover, Singapore
- The Dover Road (play), a play by A.A. Milne
- The Dover Road (film), a 1934 American film adaptation of the Milne play
