= The Dover Road =

The Dover Road may refer to:

- A former name of the A2 road (England)
- The Dover Road (play), a play by A.A. Milne
- The Dover Road (film), a 1934 American film adaptation
