= A Just Punishment =

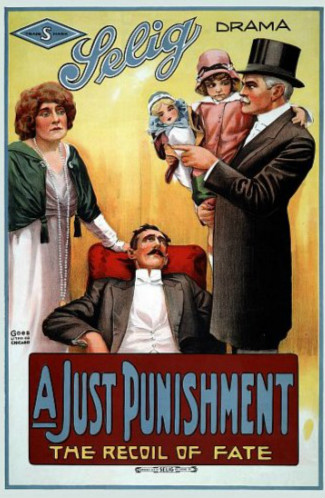
- Film poster
- Directed by: Edward LeSaint
- Written by: E. Lynn Summers
- Produced by: Selig Polyscope
- Starring: Guy Oliver; Eugenie Besserer
- Distributed by: General Film Company
- Release date: September 23, 1914
- Running time: short; 1 reel
- Country: USA
- Language: Silent..English titles

A Just Punishment is a lost 1914 silent short film directed by Edward Le Saint and starring Guy Oliver and Eugenie Besserer.

== Cast ==
- Guy Oliver as Bob Preston
- Eugenie Besserer as Mrs. Preston
- Lillian Wade as Adele, the Preston Child
- Jack McDonald as Preston, the Rich Uncle
