= The Prince Chap =

1920 film by William C. deMille

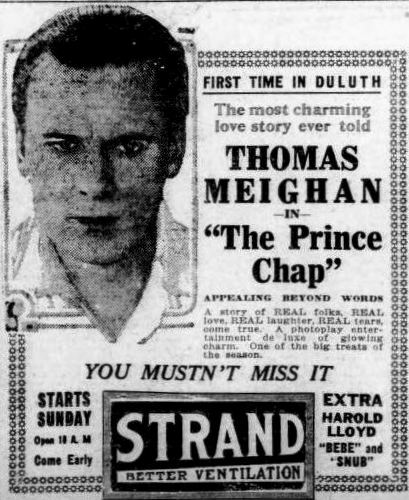
- Newspaper advertisement
- Directed by: William C. deMille
- Screenplay by: Olga Printzlau (scenario)
- Based on: The Prince Chap by Edward Peple
- Produced by: Jesse L. Lasky
- Starring: Thomas Meighan; Charles Ogle; Kathlyn Williams; Casson Ferguson; Ann Forrest; Peaches Jackson; Mae Giraci
- Cinematography: L. Guy Wilky
- Production company: Famous Players–Lasky Corporation
- Distributed by: Paramount Pictures
- Release date: August 1920
- Running time: 60 minutes
- Country: United States
- Language: Silent (English intertitles)

The Prince Chap is a 1920 American silent drama film directed by William C. deMille and written by Olga Printzlau based upon the play of the same name by Edward Peple. The film stars Thomas Meighan, Charles Ogle, Kathlyn Williams, Casson Ferguson, Ann Forrest, Peaches Jackson, and Mae Giraci. The film was released in August 1920, by Paramount Pictures.

== Plot ==
As described in a film magazine, William Peyton, an artist occupying a poor apartment in the Latin quarter of London with his servant Runion, is prevailed by a poor artists' model to take her child and keep it upon her death. William agrees and raises Claudia as if she was his own daughter. His fiancée Alice Travers, hearing Claudia call him "pappa", misunderstands the situation and breaks their engagement. After several years, William has become prosperous and Claudia grows into womanhood. Jack, the Earl of Huntington, a fellow artist and friend of William, falls in love with Claudia and asks for her hand in marriage. She refuses him. Alice, now a widow, returns to renew their friendship, but William's love for her is dead. He loves only Claudia and finds that his love is reciprocated.

== Cast ==
- Thomas Meighan as William Peyton
- Charles Ogle as Runion
- Kathlyn Williams as Alice Travers
- Casson Ferguson as Jack, Earl of Huntington
- Ann Forrest as Phoebe Puckers
- Peaches Jackson as Claudia (age 4)
- Mae Giraci as Claudia (age 8)
- Lila Lee as Claudia (age 18)
- Lillian Leighton as Aunt
- Bertram Johns as Ballington
- Florence Hart as Claudia's Mother
- Theodore Kosloff as Yadder
- Clarence Geldart as Helmer
- Yvonne Gardelle

== Preservation status ==
It is not known whether the film currently survives.
