= Mae Giraci =

American actress

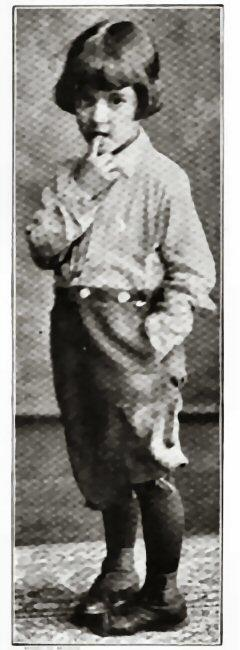
- Motion Picture Classic, 1917
- Born: Mae Georgia Giraci; January 22, 1910; Los Angeles, California, US
- Died: January 10, 2006 (aged 95); Los Angeles, California, US
- Other names: May Giraci, May Garcia, May Geraci, May Giracci, May Giracia and Tina Rossi
- Occupation: Actress
- Known for: Lorna Doone (1922); Miss Lulu Bett (film) (1921); Reputation (1921); One More American (1918)
- Spouse: Herman C. Platz (m. 1931–2006)
- Children: 3
- Parent(s): Santo Giraci; Anna De Nubila

Mae Georgia Giraci (January 22, 1910 – January 10, 2006), also known as May Giraci, May Garcia, May Geraci, May Giracci, May Giracia and Tina Rossi, was an American child actress who appeared in silent films between 1915 and 1929.

Giraci was born in Los Angeles. She was discovered by director Cecil B. DeMille and worked with him and his brother William C. DeMille. She died of colon cancer in 2006.

== Selected filmography ==
- Casey at the Bat (1916)
- The Children of the Feud (1916)
- A Daughter of the Poor (1917)
- Cheerful Givers (1917)
- A Strange Transgressor (1917)
- For Better, for Worse (1919)
- The Lady of Red Butte (1919)
- The World and Its Woman (1919)
- The Son of Tarzan (1920)
- The Cheater (1920)
- The Prince Chap (1920)
- Reputation (1921)
- Miss Lulu Bett (1921)
- Lorna Doone (1922)
- Secrets (1924)
- The Godless Girl (1929)
