= Yvonne Gardelle =

American actress (1897–1979)

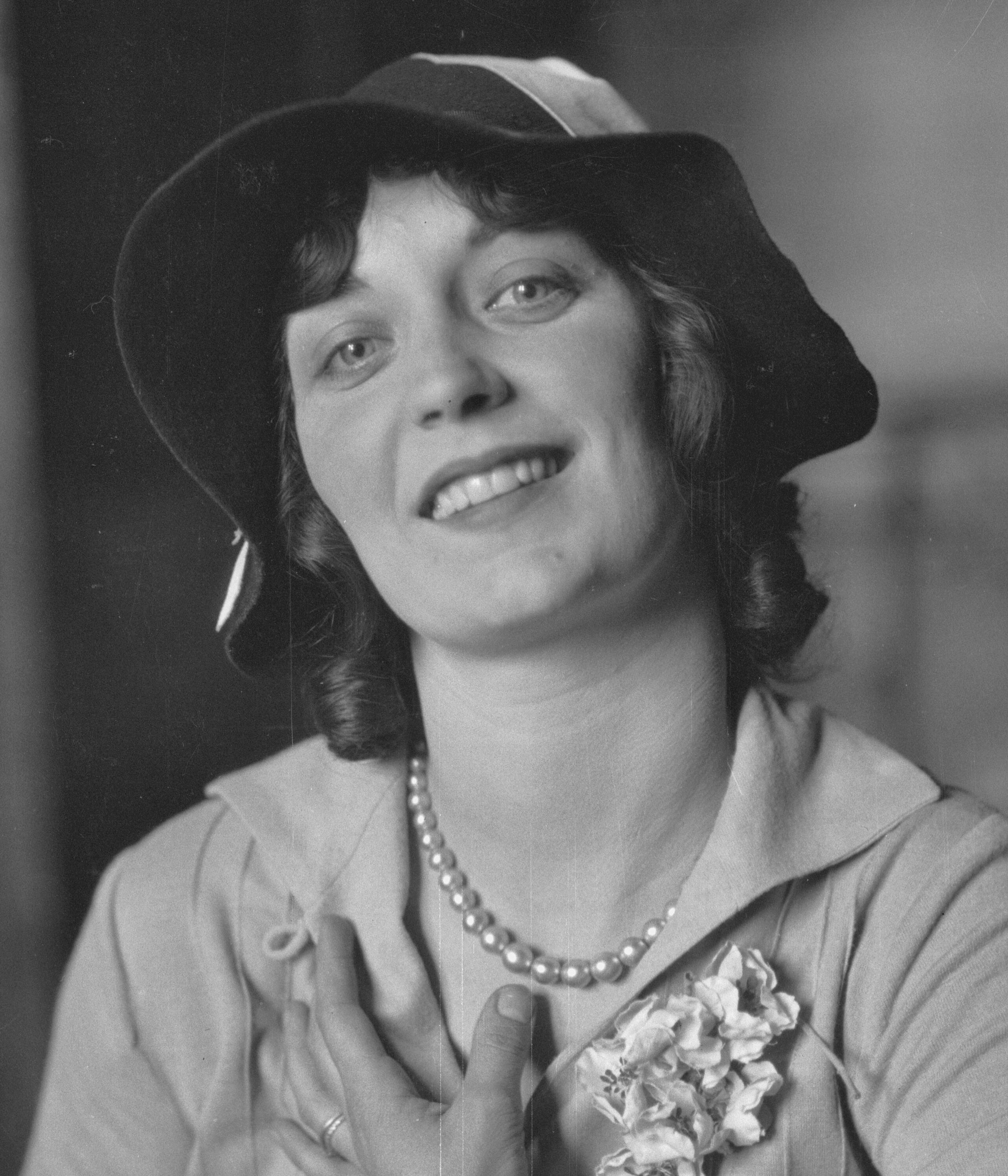
- Gardelle in 1927
- Born: Alice Yvonne Clark; October 7, 1897; Chicago, Illinois
- Died: July 21, 1979 (aged 81); Oceanside, California
- Other names: Yvonne Chappelle, Alice Y. Gardner, Yvonne Riddle
- Occupations: Actress, dancer, artist's model
- Spouse: Roy L. Brooks (divorced 1921) Carlton Gardelle (1922–1923) Mel Riddle (married 1925)

Yvonne Gardelle (October 7, 1897 – July 21, 1979), born Alice Yvonne Clark, also known as Alice Y. Gardner, Yvonne Chappelle, or Yvonne Riddle, was an American actress in silent films, a dancer and an artist's model.

== Early life ==
Alice Yvonne Clark was born in Chicago. As "Yvonne Gardelle", she was presented in early press as the daughter of a French dancer, and the adopted daughter of sculptor Carlton Gardelle, who raised her as his own from early childhood. She married Gardelle in 1922.

After they divorced, she denounced that origin story as a "lurid fabrication", explaining to a Los Angeles newspaper in 1924 that "I never met Mr. Gardelle, whose real name is Gardner, until I was 13 years old." She resumed the name "Yvonne Chappelle" to further remove herself from Gardelle.

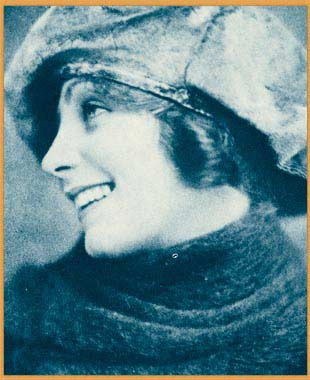
Yvonne Gardelle in Who's Who on the Screen (1920)

== Career ==
Yvonne Chappelle started her career as a young dancer in vaudeville. In 1914, she danced in a minimal costume as the lead in a pageant called "Revels of Daphne", performed at the General Federation of Women's Clubs meeting in Chicago. The pageant was directed by Clyde A. Gardner, later known as "Carlton Gardelle".

Yvonne Chappelle was announced among the cast principals for the Atlantic City, NJ opening of the Ziegfeld Follies.

As Yvonne Chappelle she had small roles in two silent films, As a Woman Sows (1916) and Restitution (1918). As Yvonne Gardelle, she appeared in three more silent films, The Tree of Knowledge (1920), directed by William C. DeMille, The Prince Chap (1920), also directed by William C. DeMille, and Occasionally Yours (1920), directed by James W. Horne and starring Lew Cody. She appeared on screen without clothing as Lilith in a Garden of Eden sequence in The Tree of Knowledge, with Russian dancer Theodore Kosloff. She was promoted as "physically perfect" in the publicity surrounding The Prince Chap. In 1921, she appeared in "a series of bathing scenes" in a touring show, Kismet, starring Otis Skinner.

While appearing in a 1925 production of The Ten Commandments, Chappelle modeled with a new automobile, the Auburn Wanderer; the car was advertised as a "sedan by day, bedroom by night", for its convertible back compartment. She also made a 1925 publicity trip in the Diana sedan by Moon Motors. Also in 1925, she sued the Pacific Electric Railway for injuries to her leg, after she was involved in a car accident with a Pacific Electric rail car. In 1926 she sang on a radio broadcast, and was a finalist in a newspaper beauty contest in Los Angeles.

Yvonne Chappelle Riddle opened a dance school in Tarzana in 1930. She also worked in real estate in the 1930s. With her third husband, she wrote a show, Frieda Drake, Proprietor (1942).

== Personal life ==
She was married to an actor, Roy L. Brooks; they divorced in 1921. She married Carlton Gardelle in 1922. They divorced in 1923. She married again by the end of 1925, to Mel Riddle, a theatrical publicist. Riddle wrote a song, 'Yvonne', in her honor. She died in 1979, aged 81 years, in Oceanside, California.
