= The Wise Wife =

1927 film

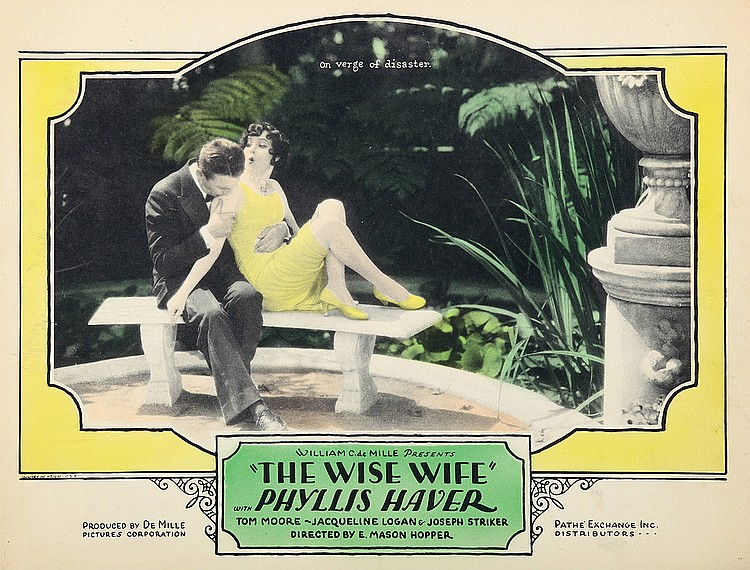
- Directed by: E. Mason Hopper
- Written by: Arthur Somers Roche (novel); Zelda Sears; Tay Garnett; John W. Krafft
- Produced by: William C. de Mille
- Starring: Phyllis Haver; Tom Moore; Jacqueline Logan
- Cinematography: Frank B. Good
- Edited by: Adelaide Cannon
- Production company: DeMille Pictures Corporation
- Distributed by: Pathé Exchange
- Release date: October 24, 1927
- Running time: 60 minutes
- Country: United States
- Languages: Silent; English intertitles

The Wise Wife is a 1927 American silent comedy film directed by E. Mason Hopper and starring Phyllis Haver, Tom Moore and Jacqueline Logan.

The film's sets were designed by the art director Mitchell Leisen. The costumes were by Adrian.

== Cast ==
- Phyllis Haver as Helen Blaisdell
- Tom Moore as John Blaisdell
- Fred Walton as Helen's father
- Jacqueline Logan as Jenny Lou
- Joseph Striker as Carter Fairfax
- Robert Bolder as Jason, the Butler

== Bibliography ==
- Goble, Alan. The Complete Index to Literary Sources in Film. Walter de Gruyter, 1999.
