= Almost Human (1927 film) =

1927 film by Frank John Urson

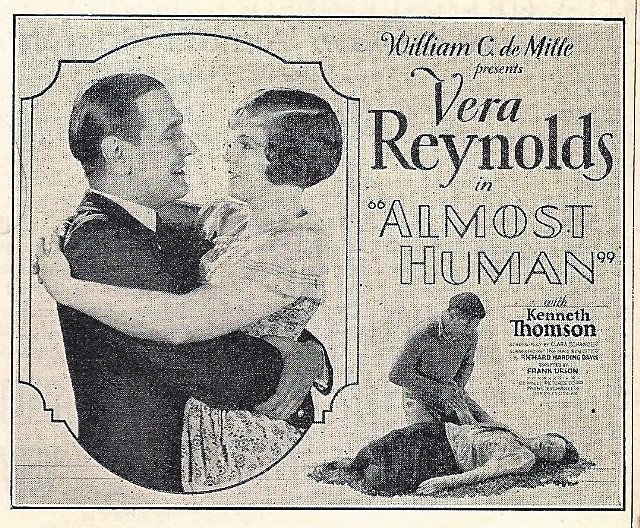
- advertisement
- Directed by: Frank Urson
- Written by: Richard Harding Davis (novel The Bar Sinister); Clara Beranger
- Produced by: William C. deMille
- Starring: Vera Reynolds; Kenneth Thomson
- Cinematography: Lucien Andriot
- Edited by: Adelaide Cannon
- Production company: DeMille Pictures Corporation
- Distributed by: Pathé Exchange
- Release date: December 26, 1927
- Running time: 60 minutes
- Country: United States
- Languages: Silent; English intertitles

Almost Human is a 1927 American silent drama film directed by Frank Urson, starring Vera Reynolds and Kenneth Thomson, produced by Cecil B. DeMille and William C. de Mille, and distributed through Pathé Exchange. The picture was based upon a novel by Richard Harding Davis entitled The Bar Sinister.

== Summary ==
According to a film magazine, "Maggie, a gutter dog, lures Regent Royal, a pedigreed canine, to her poor lair in an old barn. After a day or two, Regent returns to his magnificent home, that of the Livingstone’s. Maggie, in due course, gives birth to a male pup, later known as Pal. She tells him to find his “human” and vanishes. By chance, Pal meets Mary Kelley, a homeless waif, in the park. She shares some crackers with him, and the two become fast friends. John Livingstone, a rich man, strolls along with his dog, Regent Royal. John and Mary, brought together through their dogs become acquainted. Livingstone takes Mary to his home after he saves her from a near tragedy when she had dived into a lake to rescue a child. It is Regent who brings the child safely to shore. Livingstone avows his love for Mary, but his aristocratic mother objects to their marriage. They are married regardless of the mother’s objection. The rest of the plot concerns the way the dogs aid their “humans” who are in a tangling situation. All ends well, and Mrs. Livingstone accepts Mary as her daughter."

== Cast ==
- Vera Reynolds as Mary Kelly
- Kenneth Thomson as John Livingston
- Majel Coleman as Cecile Adams
- Claire McDowell as Mrs. Livingston
- Ethel Wales as Katie
- Fred Walton as Doctor
- Hank as Pal, a dog
- Paul as Regent Royal, a dog
- Trixie as Maggie, a dog

== Preservation ==
A complete 16 mm film print of Almost Human is held by the UCLA Film & Television Archive.
