= Minnette Barrett =

American actress (1880–1964)

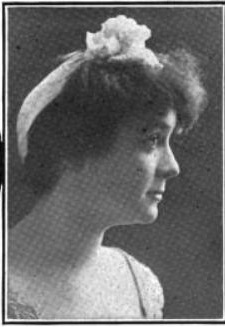
- Minnette Barrett c. 1910
- Born: March 25, 1880; Gainesville, Georgia
- Died: June 20, 1964 (aged 84); Queens, New York

Minnette Barrett (March 25, 1880 – June 20, 1964) was an American actress. Born in Gainesville, Georgia, she began her career on the stage in California in 1899 as a member of Harry Corson Clarke's theater troupe. She worked in stock theatre, on tour, and in vaudeville in her early career. In 1904 she married Hiram Mitchell, the son of United States senator John H. Mitchell. She gave her first performance on Broadway in 1907, and performed periodically on the New York stage into the 1950s. She also appeared in a few silent films during the 1910s.

== Life and career ==
Minnette Barrett was born in Gainesville, Georgia on March 25, 1880. Her real name was Minnie Smith and she was the daughter of Amelia de F. Smith. She began her career as a member of Harry Corson Clarke's theatre troupe in 1899; performing in What Happened to Jones at theaters in California. That same year she became a member of T. Daniel Frawley's theatre troupe which was then playing in San Francisco. In March 1900 she toured with Fawley's company to Oregon as Isabelle Popervach in Henry Arthur Jones's The Dancing Girl and as Sophie in David Belasco's The Charity Ball in 1900. The following month she performed at the Los Angeles Theater in Los Angeles with Fawley's troupe in An Unconventional Honeymoon, and in In Paradise.

In 1901 Barrett performed at the Burbank Theatre as Maria in Brother John. In 1902 she toured with Frawley's troupe as Ottilene Mallinson in Lord and Lady Algy, and toured in vaudeville in the Orpheum Circuit. She appeared in vaudeville with Joe Jefferson Jr. and Florence Nash. In 1903 she was a member of Gertrude Berkeley's theatre company which was in residence in Kansas City, Missouri. In 1904 she married Hiram Mitchell, the son of United States senator John H. Mitchell, at the Little Church Around The Corner in New York City.

In 1906 Barrett portrayed Louise in Leo Ditrichstein's new farce Before and After. She portrayed Hortense Madigan in the 1907 Broadway production of The Primrose Path. That same year she portrayed Annie White in Jean Schwartz's Broadway musical Lola from Berlin at the Liberty Theatre, and Pauline Shank in The Coming of Mrs. Patrick at the Madison Square Theatre.

Barrett portrayed Cornelia Van Gorder in both the original 1920 Broadway production and the 1937 Broadway revival of Mary Roberts Rinehart and Avery Hopwood hit play The Bat. Her other Broadway credits included The Show Off, Mr. Buttles (1910), Mother (1910, as Ardath Wetherill), In 1999 (1912) (playlet) Lovely Lady (1925), Desire Under the Elms (1952), and Mrs. McThing (1952-1953). She had roles in the silent films Salvation Nell (1915) and The Ragamuffin (1916). During World War II she led the American Theatre Wing's war bonds drive.

Barrett died on June 20, 1964 in Queens, New York.
