= The Little Adventuress =

The Little Adventuress may refer to:

- The Little Adventuress (1927 film), American silent comedy based on A. A. Milne's play The Dover Road
- The Little Adventuress (1938 film), American B film vehicle for child actress Edith Fellows
