= The Fire Chief's Daughter =

1910 film

- Directed by: Francis Boggs
- Produced by: Selig Polyscope Company
- Starring: Kathlyn Williams
- Distributed by: General Film Company
- Release date: June 30, 1910
- Running time: 1 reel
- Country: USA
- Language: Silent ..English titles

The Fire Chief's Daughter is a 1910 silent film short directed by Francis Boggs and starring Kathlyn Williams. It was produced by the Selig Polyscope Company and released by the General Film Company.

== Cast ==
- Kathlyn Williams
