= Phyllis Haver =

American actress (1899–1960)

- Haver in 1925
- Born: Phyllis Maude Haver; January 6, 1899; Douglass, Kansas, U.S.
- Died: November 19, 1960 (aged 61); Sharon, Connecticut, U.S.
- Occupation: Actress
- Years active: 1915–1930
- Spouse: William Seeman (m. 1929; div. 1945)

Phyllis Maude Haver (January 6, 1899 – November 19, 1960) was an American actress of the silent film era.

== Early life ==
Haver was born in Douglass, Kansas, on January 6, 1898, to James Hiram Haver and Minnie Shanks Malone. Her father was a farmer and an oilman. When she was young, her family moved to Los Angeles, California. (Another source says that her parents separated when she was 8 years old, and she and her mother went to California. She grew up in her maternal grandmother's home in Los Angeles.) Haver attended Los Angeles Polytechnic High. After graduating, she played piano to accompany the new silent films in local theaters.

== Career ==
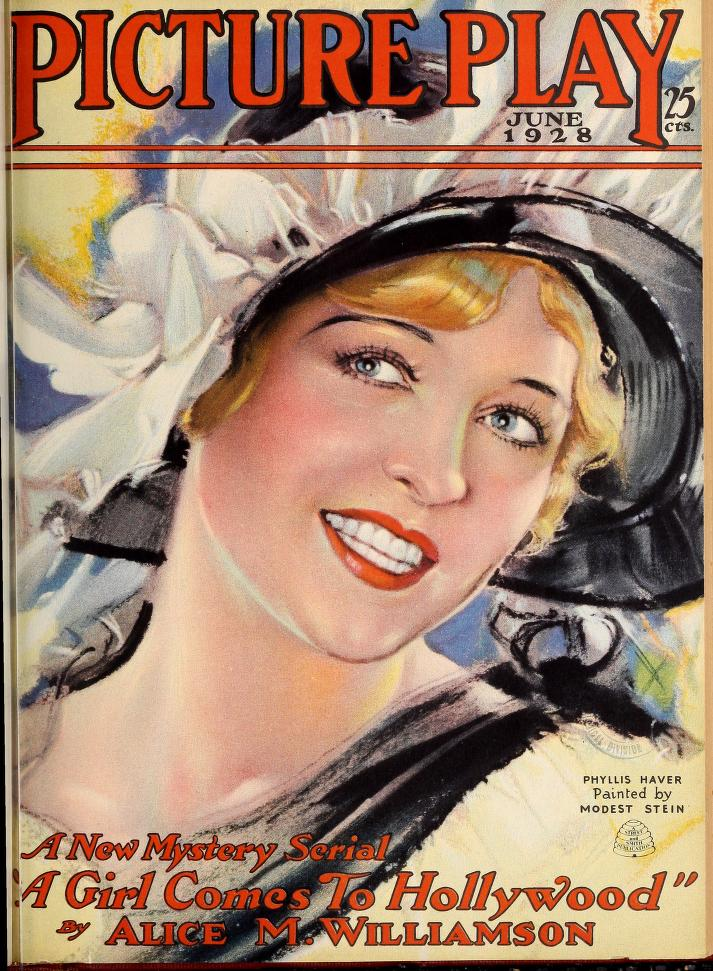
Picture Play, June 1928, Phyllis Haver on the cover

Haver auditioned for comedy producer Mack Sennett on a whim. Sennett hired her as one of his original Sennett Bathing Beauties. Within a few years, she appeared as a leading lady in two-reelers for Sennett Studios. In 1923, Buster Keaton cast her as the female lead in his short The Balloonatic.

Later, while signed with DeMille-Pathé, Haver played the part of murderer Roxie Hart in the first film adaptation of Chicago in 1927, opposite Hungarian film actor Victor Varconi. One reviewer called her performance "astoundingly fine," and added that Haver "makes this combination of tragedy and comedy a most entertaining piece of work."

She performed in the comedy film The Battle of the Sexes (1928), directed by D. W. Griffith, and appeared with Lon Chaney in his last silent film, Thunder (1929).

Haver retired from the industry in 1929 with two sound films to her credit.

== Personal life ==
On April 24, 1929, Haver married millionaire William Seeman with a service performed by New York Mayor James J. Walker at the home of Rube Goldberg, the cartoonist. The couple divorced in 1945. Haver had no children.

== Death ==
Haver retired in Sharon, Connecticut. She died at age 60 from what a medical examiner said appeared to be an overdose of barbiturates in 1960. Her body was found by a housekeeper on November 20, 1960.

== Selected filmography ==
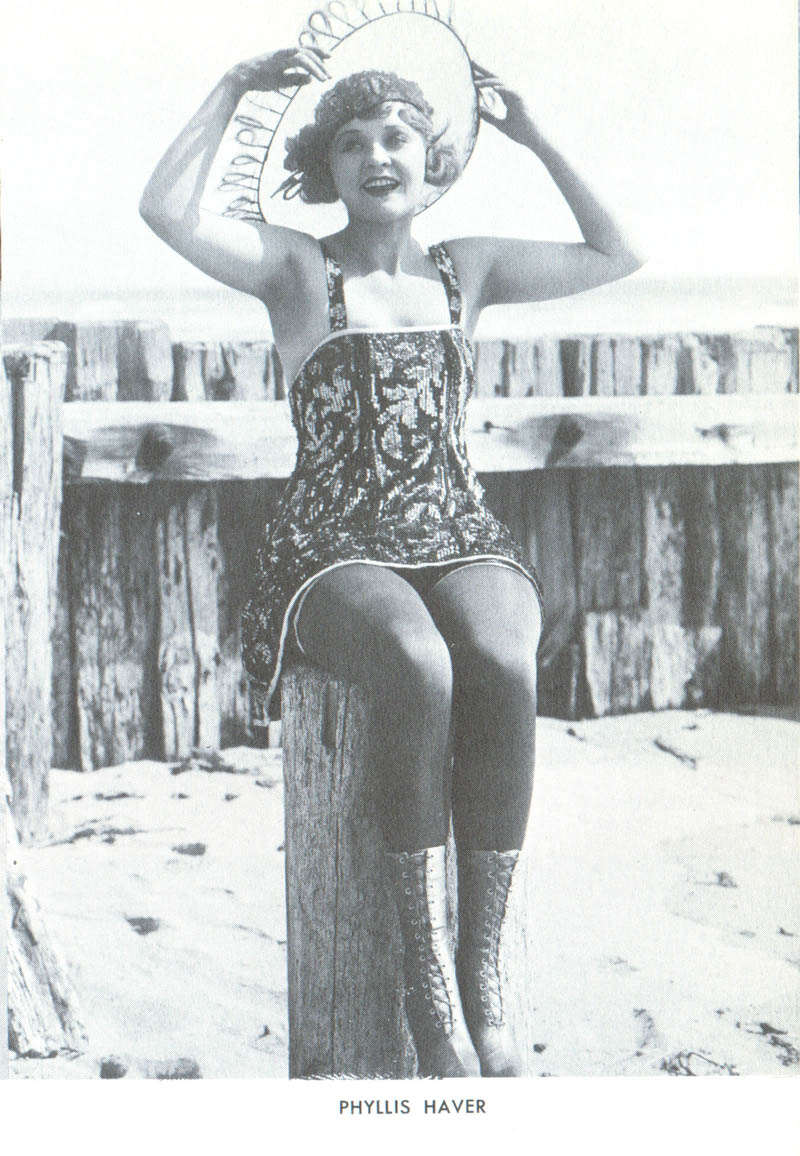
Haver as a "beach beauty", photographed by Mack Sennett in 1917

- Whose Baby? (1917)
- The Sultan's Wife (1917)
- The Pullman Bride (1917)
- '49–'17 (1917)
- Are Waitresses Safe? (1917)
- Salome vs. Shenandoah (1919)
- Love, Honor and Behave (1920)
- A Small Town Idol (1921)
- The Bolted Door (1923)
- The Balloonatic (1923 short)
- The Common Law (1923)
- Lilies of the Field (1924)
- The Fighting Coward (1924)
- Single Wives (1924)
- The Breath of Scandal (1924)
- One Glorious Night (1924)
- The Foolish Virgin (1924) *lost film
- The Snob (1924) *lost film
- New Brooms (1925) *lost film
- After Business Hours (1925)
- I Want My Man (1925)
- Her Husband's Secret (1925) *lost film
- A Fight to the Finish (1925)
- The Caveman (1926) *partially lost, one reel is missing
- Up in Mabel's Room (1926)
- Don Juan (Uncredited, 1926)
- Other Women's Husbands (1926) *lost film
- Hard Boiled (1926)
- The Nervous Wreck (1926)
- 3 Bad Men (1926)
- Fig Leaves (1926)
- What Price Glory (1926)
- The Way of All Flesh (1927) *lost film
- The Rejuvenation of Aunt Mary (1927) *lost film
- The Fighting Eagle (1927)
- No Control (1927)
- Your Wife and Mine (1927)
- The Wise Wife (1927)
- Chicago (1927)
- Nobody's Widow (1927)
- The Little Adventuress (1927)
- The Shady Lady (1928)
- The Battle of the Sexes (1928)
- Sal of Singapore (1928)
- Tenth Avenue (1928)
- Thunder (1929) *lost film, only half a reel survives
- The Office Scandal (1929)
- She Couldn't Say No (1930) *lost film, only soundtrack survives

== Bibliography ==
- "Ex-Actress Found Dead In Her Home; Phyllis Haver, Who Starred in Silent Films, Believed to Have Taken Her Life" (fee). The New York Times. Associated Press. November 21, 1960. p. 58.
