= The Thing We Love =

1918 film

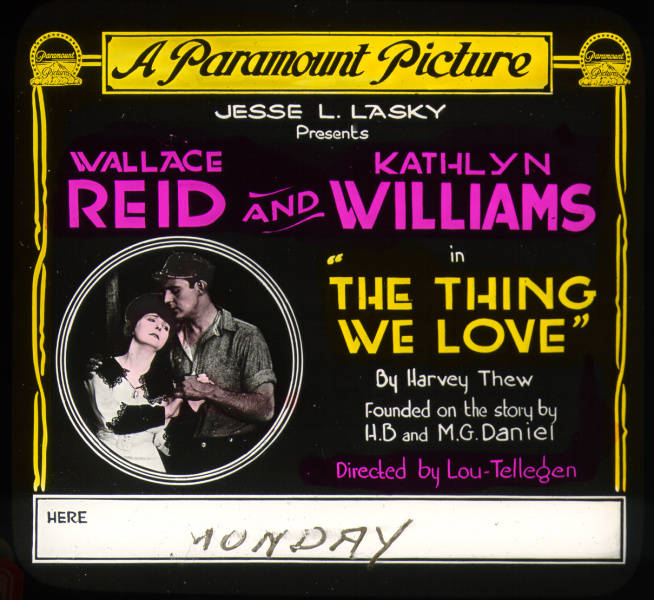
- Lantern slide
- Directed by: Lou Tellegen
- Written by: H.B. Daniel (story); M.B. Daniel (story); Harvey F. Thew (scenario/writer)
- Produced by: Jesse L. Lasky
- Starring: Wallace Reid; Kathlyn Williams; Tully Marshall
- Production company: Famous Players–Lasky
- Distributed by: Paramount Pictures
- Release date: February 11, 1918
- Running time: 4 reels
- Country: United States
- Language: Silent (English intertitles)

The Thing We Love is a lost 1918 American silent drama film starring Wallace Reid, Kathlyn Williams, and Tully Marshall, produced by Jesse Lasky, distributed by Paramount Pictures, and directed by Lou Tellegen. This marked Tellegen's second foray into directing as he usually was a leading man in front of the camera like Reid.

== Cast ==
- Wallace Reid as Rodney Sheridan
- Kathlyn Williams as Margaret Kenwood
- Tully Marshall as Henry D. Kenwood
- Mayme Kelso as Mrs. Kenwood
- Charles Ogle as Adolph Weimer
- William Elmer as Kenwood's Agent (credited as Billy Elmer)

== Preservation status ==
With no prints of The Thing We Love located in any film archives, it is a lost film.

== See also ==
- List of lost films
