= Thou Shalt Not Covet =

1916 film

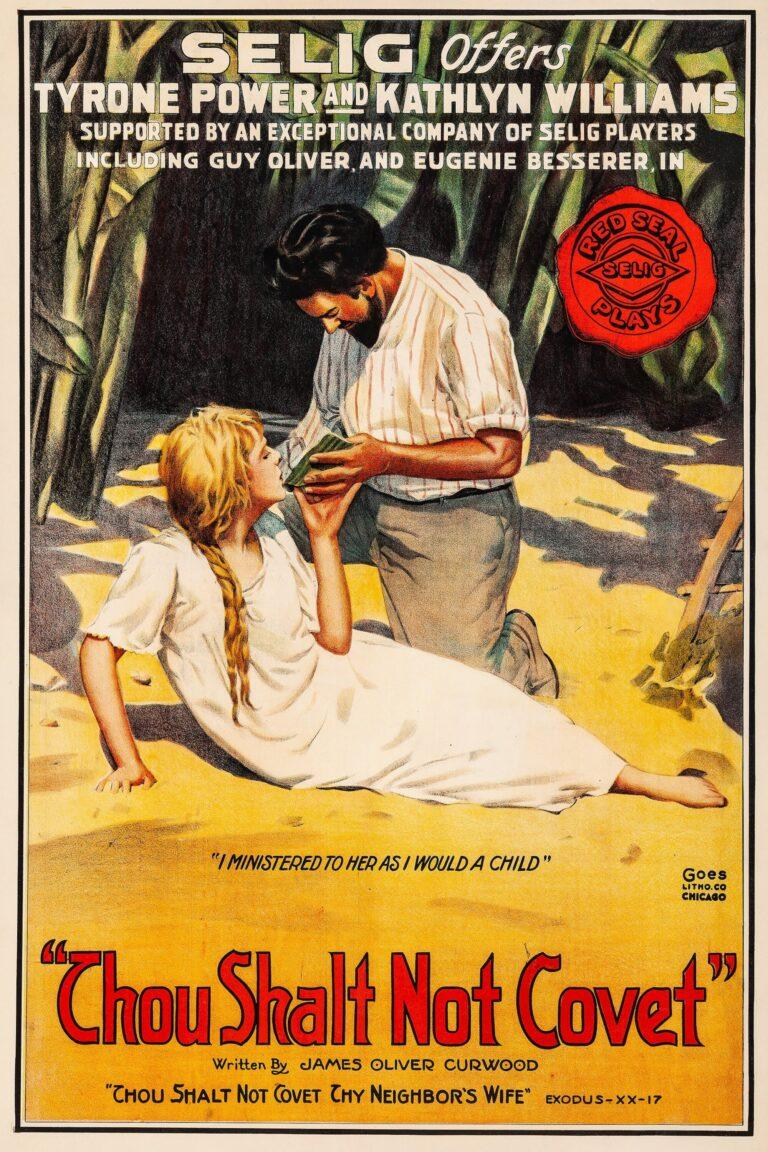
- Directed by: Colin Campbell
- Written by: James Oliver Curwood
- Produced by: William Nicholas Selig
- Starring: Tyrone Power Sr.; Kathlyn Williams; Guy Oliver
- Production company: Selig Polyscope Company
- Distributed by: V-L-S-E
- Release date: February 7, 1916
- Running time: 5 reels
- Country: United States
- Languages: Silent; English intertitles

Thou Shalt Not Covet is a 1916 American silent drama film directed by Colin Campbell and starring Tyrone Power Sr., Kathlyn Williams, and Guy Oliver. A print of Thou Shalt Not Covet exists.

== Cast ==
- Tyrone Power Sr. as I, or the Hero
- Kathlyn Williams as My Neighbor's Wife
- Guy Oliver as My Neighbor
- Eugenie Besserer as My Wife

== Bibliography ==
- Donald W. McCaffrey & Christopher P. Jacobs. Guide to the Silent Years of American Cinema. Greenwood Publishing, 1999. ISBN 0-313-30345-2
