= For Alimony Only =

1926 American silent drama film

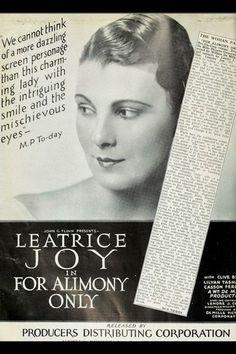
- Trade adververtisement
- Directed by: William C. deMille
- Written by: Lenore J. Coffee
- Produced by: John C. Flinn
- Starring: Leatrice Joy; Clive Brook; Lilyan Tashman
- Cinematography: Arthur C. Miller
- Edited by: Adelaide Cannon
- Production company: DeMille Pictures Corporation
- Distributed by: Producers Distributing Corporation
- Release date: September 20, 1926
- Running time: 70 minutes
- Country: United States
- Language: Silent (English intertitles)

For Alimony Only is a 1926 American silent drama film directed by William C. deMille and starring Leatrice Joy, Clive Brook, and Lilyan Tashman.

The film's sets were by the art director Max Parker while the costumes were designed by Adrian, later known for his work at MGM.

== Plot ==
As described in a film magazine review, gold digger Narcissa marries Peter Williams so that she can then divorce him and live comfortably on the alimony. After Peter takes a second wife in the person of Mary Martin, he discovers that it is an expensive thing to maintain a past and present wife. With tight family finances, Mary is so understanding and such in love with Peter that she starts working in interior decorating to help their cause. While decorating the home of wife #1, she finds her husband visiting the ex-wife. Mary immediately steps out with Marcissa's boyfriend, Bertie Waring. After several situations, both couples end up at a roadhouse and all four are caught up in a police raid on the premises. To save the situation, Mary tells the police that Narcissa and Bertie were about to stage a wedding ceremony. To avoid arrest, they go through with it. The marriage of the ex-wife now ends Peter's alimony obligation, and Mary is satisfied that she put one over on the former gold digger.

== Cast ==
- Leatrice Joy as Mary Martin Williams
- Clive Brook as Peter Williams
- Lilyan Tashman as Narcissa Williams
- Casson Ferguson as Bertie Waring
- Toby Claude as The Maid
- André Cheron as Shop Manager
- Harry Semels as Cop
- Florence Wix as Christmas Party Guest

== Production ==
Leatrice Joy had impulsively cut her hair short in 1926, and Cecil B. DeMille, whom Joy had followed when he set up Producers Distributing Corporation, was publicly angry as it prevented her from portraying traditional feminine roles. The studio developed projects with roles suitable for her “Leatrice Joy bob”, and For Alimony Only was the fourth of five films before she regrew her hair. Despite this, a professional dispute would end the Joy / Demille partnership in 1928.

== Preservation ==
A copy of For Alimony Only is preserved film at the UCLA Film and Television Archive.

== Bibliography ==
- Donald W. McCaffrey & Christopher P. Jacobs. Guide to the Silent Years of American Cinema. Greenwood Publishing, 1999. ISBN 0-313-30345-2
