= The Tree of Knowledge (1920 film) =

1920 film by William C. deMille

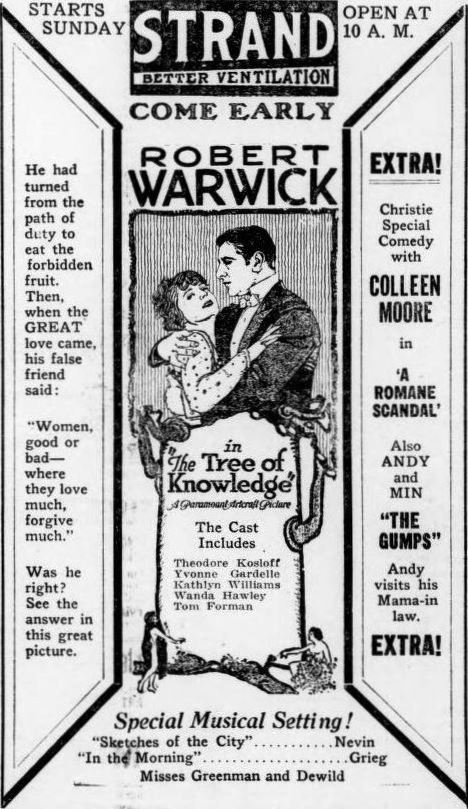
- Newspaper advertisement
- Directed by: William C. deMille
- Written by: Margaret Turnbull (scenario)
- Based on: The Tree of Knowledge by R. C. Carton
- Produced by: Adolph Zukor; Jesse Lasky
- Starring: Robert Warwick; Kathlyn Williams; Wanda Hawley
- Cinematography: L. Guy Wilky
- Distributed by: Paramount Pictures
- Release date: January 18, 1920
- Running time: 5 reels
- Country: United States
- Language: Silent (English intertitles)

The Tree of Knowledge is a lost 1920 American silent drama film produced by Famous Players–Lasky and distributed by Paramount Pictures. It was directed by William C. deMille and starred Robert Warwick. It is based on an 1897 play, The Tree of Knowledge, by R. C. Carton.

In a prologue to the film involving a Garden of Eden scene, Yvonne Gardelle appears nude as Lilith to tempt Adam, who was played by dancer Theodore Kosloff. The two actors of the prologue were promoted in print advertisements for the film.

== Plot ==
After living with adventuress Belle in Paris, Nigel proposes, but she rejects him for a wealthier suitor. Nigel returns to England, where his friend Brian hires him to manage his estate. Nigel falls in love with Brian's ward Monica. Brian travels to Paris and meets Belle. Unaware of her past, Brian marries her, and, when they return to England, Belle says nothing when they meet her ex-lover Nigel. Belle, who had only married for money, then discovers that Brian's family is bankrupt, and begins an affair with Roupelle. After Nigel discovers that she is planning to elope, he prevents the betrayal, but their prior affair is revealed to Brian. However, Monica forgives him for his transgressions.

== Cast ==
- Theodore Kosloff as Adam
- Yvonne Gardelle as Lilith
- Robert Warwick as Nigel Stanyon
- Kathlyn Williams as Belle
- Wanda Hawley as Monica
- Tom Forman as Brian
- Winter Hall as Siur Mostyn Hollingsworth
- Irving Cummings as Loftus Roupelle
- Loyola O'Connor as Mrs. Stanyon
- Clarence Geldart as The Baron
- William H. Brown as Swedle

== Censorship ==
The film was rejected in its entirety by the Kansas Board of Review, with no reason given.
