= The Circular Staircase (film) =

1915 film by Edward LeSaint

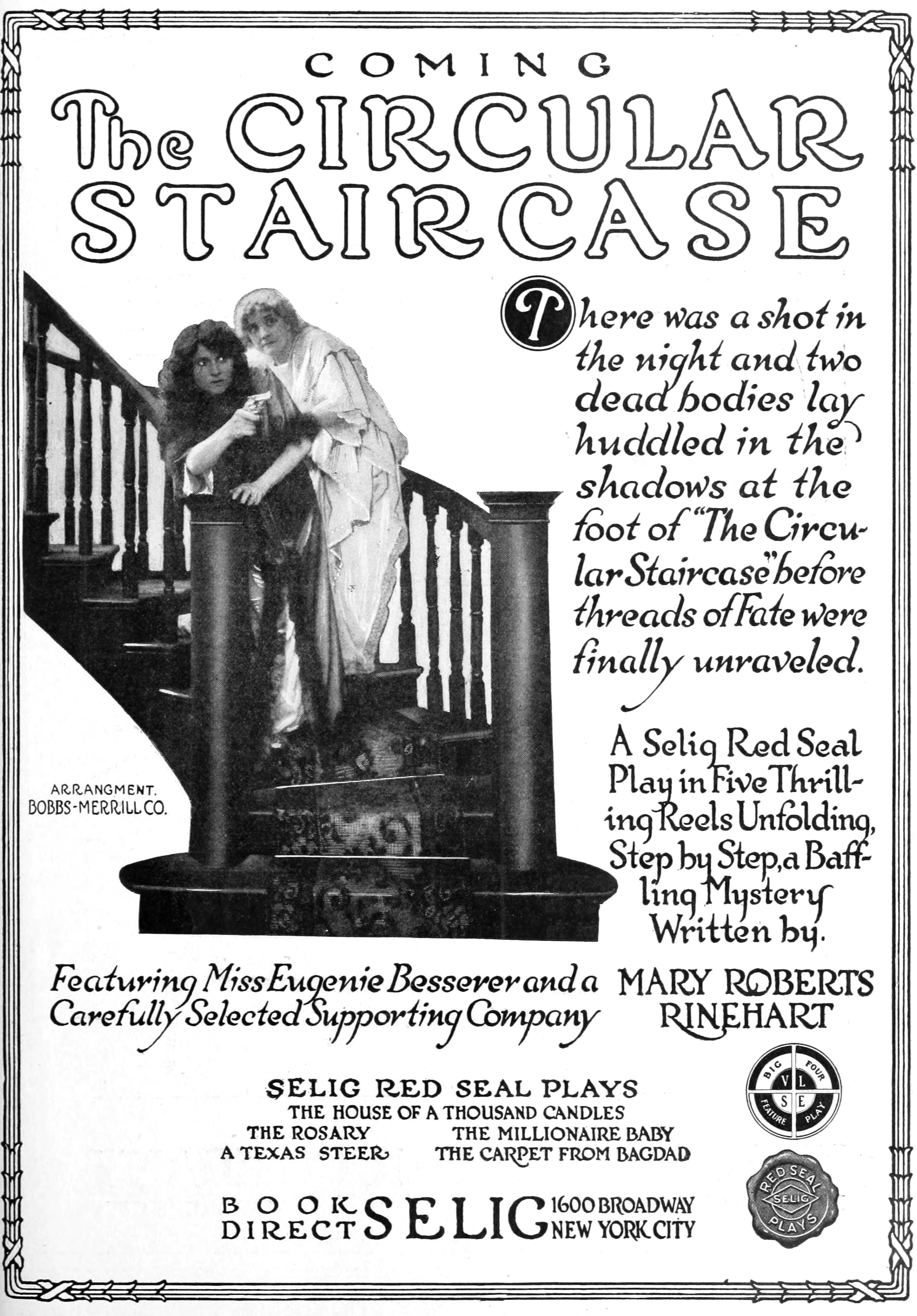
- Advertisement
- Directed by: Edward LeSaint
- Story by: Mary Roberts Rinehart
- Based on: The Circular Staircase
- Starring: Guy Oliver Eugenie Besserer Stella Razeto
- Production company: Selig Polyscope Company
- Distributed by: V-L-S-E Inc.
- Release date: September 20, 1915

The Circular Staircase is a 1915 mystery silent film directed by Edward LeSaint and starring Guy Oliver, Eugenie Besserrer, and Stella Razeto. The film was produced by the Selig Polyscope Company. It is based on the mystery novel of the same name by Mary Roberts Rinehart, which was originally published in five parts starting with the November 1907 issue of All-Story magazine. The film is now lost.

== Plot ==
Halsey and Gertrude Innes, along with Gertrude's fiancé Jack Bailey, visit their Aunt Ray who is leasing banker Paul Armstrong's home for the summer. Aunt Ray finds Arnold Armstrong, Paul's son, dead at the foot of the staircase and suspicion falls on Jack since he is Arnold's business enemy. Lousie Armstrong, who is travelling with her dad, is found hiding and dazed. The house keeper, Mrs. Watson, develops blood poisoning and falls down the stairs. Soon after, news arrives from Armstrong's bank, which was recently robbed, that Armstrong has died. Mrs. Watson confesses to shooting Arnold because he had beat her with a golf club. Aunt Ray accidentally discovers Paul Armstrong hiding in a secret room and screams, alerting the others. Detective Jamieson and the new gardener Alex pursue Armstrong. During the chase, Armstrong slips and fatally falls down the stairs. It is revealed that Alex was actually Jack in disguise trying to clear his name. Gertrude embraces him, and Louise hugs Halsey.

== Cast ==
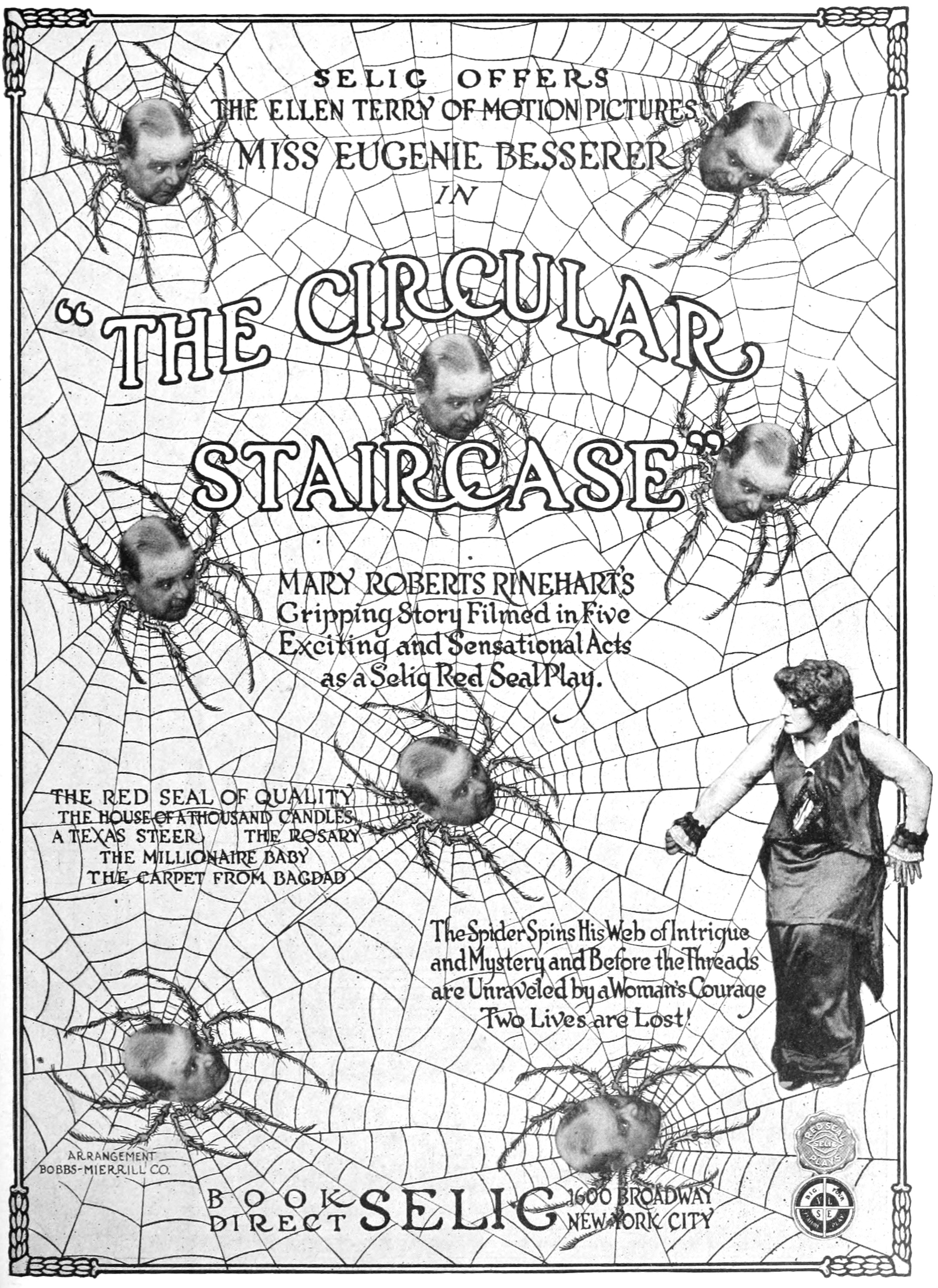
Advertisement for The Circular Staircase

- Guy Oliver as Halsey Innes
- Eugenie Besserer as Aunt Ray
- Stella Razeto as Gertrude Innes
- Edith Johnson as Louise Armstrong
- William Howard as Jack Bailey
- Anna Dodge as Liddy
- Jane Watson as Mrs. Watson
- F. J. Tyler as Old Tom
- Fred Huntley as Detective Jamieson
- Clyde Benson as Arnold Armstrong
- George Hernandez as Paul Armstrong
- Bertram Grassby as Dr. Walker

== Legacy ==
Mary Roberts Rinehart adapted The Circular Staircase into a play titled The Bat with Avery Hopwood. The play opened on August 23, 1920, at Morosco Theatre. It ran for 878 performances on Broadway before travelling to other cities as well. The Bat would spawn adaptations of its own, including a novel titled The Bat and three movies titled The Bat (1926), The Bat Whispers (1930), and The Bat (1959). In his autobiography, Bob Kane says that he got the inspiration for Batman from The Bat.
