= Adelaide Cannon =

American film editor

- Born: Adelaide Brevoort Cannon; January 4, 1883; Kansas City, Missouri, USA
- Died: February 17, 1971 (aged 88); San Gabriel, California, USA
- Occupation: Film editor

Adelaide Cannon (born January 4, 1883 – February 17, 1971) was an American film editor and script assistant active during the 1920s.

== Biography ==
Adelaide was born in Kansas City, Missouri, to James Cannon and Katherine Brevoort.

She worked various jobs after moving to Los Angeles with her mother in the 1910s, before ultimately finding her way into Paramount's editing department in the 1920s.

She worked on over half a dozen films as an editor and script assistant, although she wasn't always credited. She also worked as a secretary and script clerk for actress Colleen Moore, writer-director Ralph Ince, and director Raoul Walsh.

== Selected filmography ==
- Tenth Avenue (1928)
- Skyscraper (1928)
- Almost Human (1927)
- The Wise Wife (1927)
- The Little Adventuress (1927)
- For Alimony Only (1926)
- Mantrap (1926)
- Locked Doors (1924) (uncredited)
