= New Brooms =

1925 film

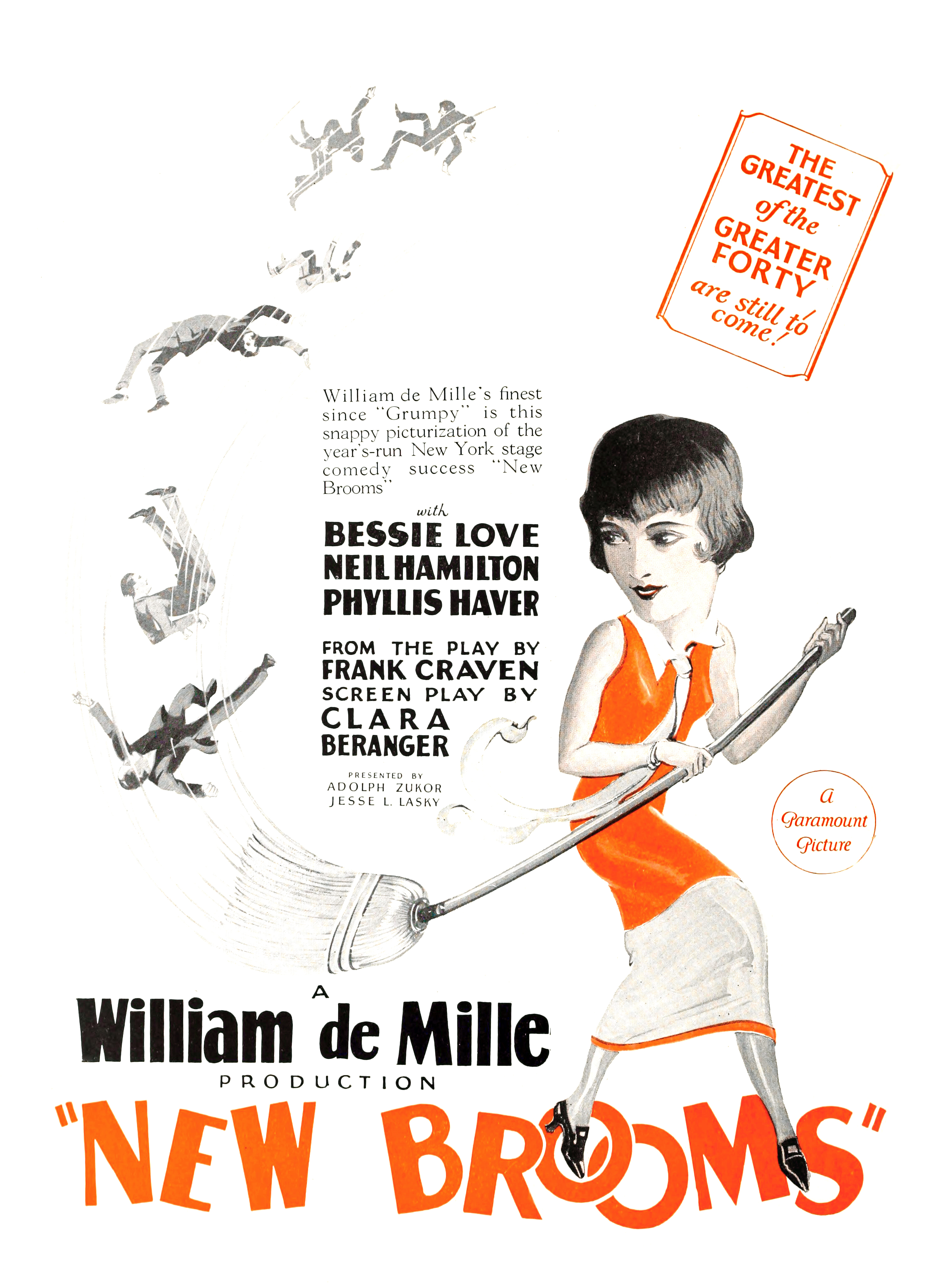
- Advertisement for the film
- Directed by: William C. deMille
- Written by: Clara Beranger (scenario)
- Based on: New Brooms: a Comedy in Three Acts (play) by Frank Craven
- Produced by: Adolph Zukor; Jesse Lasky
- Starring: Bessie Love; Neil Hamilton; Phyllis Haver
- Cinematography: L. Guy Wilky
- Production company: Famous Players–Lasky
- Distributed by: Paramount Pictures
- Release date: October 12, 1925 (U.S.)
- Running time: 6 reels; 5,443 feet
- Country: United States
- Language: Silent (English intertitles)

New Brooms is a 1925 American silent romantic comedy directed by William C. deMille and starring Bessie Love, Neil Hamilton, and Phyllis Haver. It was produced by Famous Players–Lasky and distributed by Paramount Pictures. It is based on Frank Craven's 1924 Broadway play of the same name.

== Plot ==
The wealthy Bates family owns a profitable broom factory, but father Thomas Sr. is criticized by his son, Thomas Jr., for his outdated business practices. Thomas Sr. agrees to let his son run the business for a year.

The family also takes in Geraldine Marsh, the daughter of a family friend who has fallen on hard times. Thomas Jr. falls for Geraldine and breaks off his engagement to Florence Levering, but then suspects that his father is also in love with Geraldine and sends his father and Geraldine away.

After his year of managing the company ended, he had been proven an unsuccessful businessman. His father and Geraldine are allowed to return, and when he sees that they were never in love, he marries Geraldine and returns control of the factory to his father.

== Cast ==
- Bessie Love as Geraldine Marsh
- Neil Hamilton as Thomas Bates Jr.
- Phyllis Haver as Florence Levering
- Robert McWade as Thomas Bates Sr.
- Fred Walton as Williams
- Josephine Crowell as Margaret
- Larry Steers as George Morrow
- James Neill as Kneeland

== Release and reception ==
Given the film's title, theaters reported some difficulty attracting audiences without incorporating broom-themed displays. Such displays did seem to prove successful.

The film received positive reviews.

== Preservation ==
With no prints of New Brooms located in any film archives, it is considered a lost film.
