= The Ragamuffin =

1916 film by William C. deMille

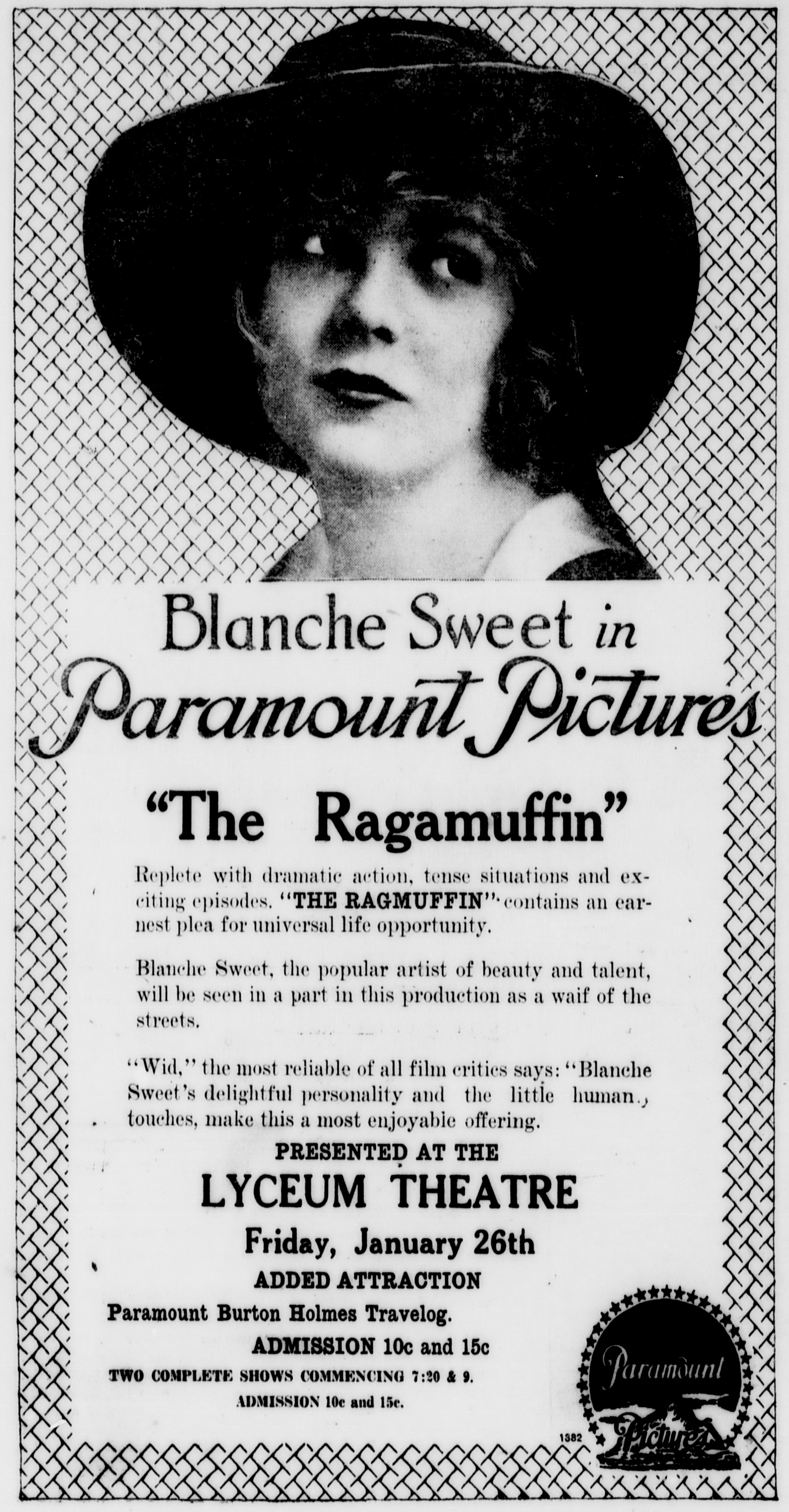
- Newspaper advertisement.
- Directed by: William C. deMille; M. A. Harris (assistant director)
- Written by: William C. deMille
- Story by: William C. deMille
- Produced by: Jesse L. Lasky
- Starring: Blanche Sweet; Tom Forman
- Cinematography: Walter Stradling
- Distributed by: Famous Players–Lasky; Paramount Pictures
- Release date: January 23, 1916
- Running time: 50 minutes
- Country: United States
- Languages: Silent; English intertitles

The Ragamuffin is a 1916 American silent drama film directed and written by William C. deMille. The film stars Blanche Sweet in a 'Pickfordish' style role.

== Cast ==
- Blanche Sweet - Jenny
- Tom Forman - Bob Van Dyke
- Minnette Barrett - Beth, His Sister
- Mrs. Lewis McCord - Mary
- Parks Jones - Jack Dexter
- James Neill - A Broker
- William Elmer - Kelly
- Agnes de Mille - Jenny, as a child

== See also ==
- Blanche Sweet filmography

== Preservation status ==
- A copy is preserved in the George Eastman Museum.
