= Locked Doors =

1925 film

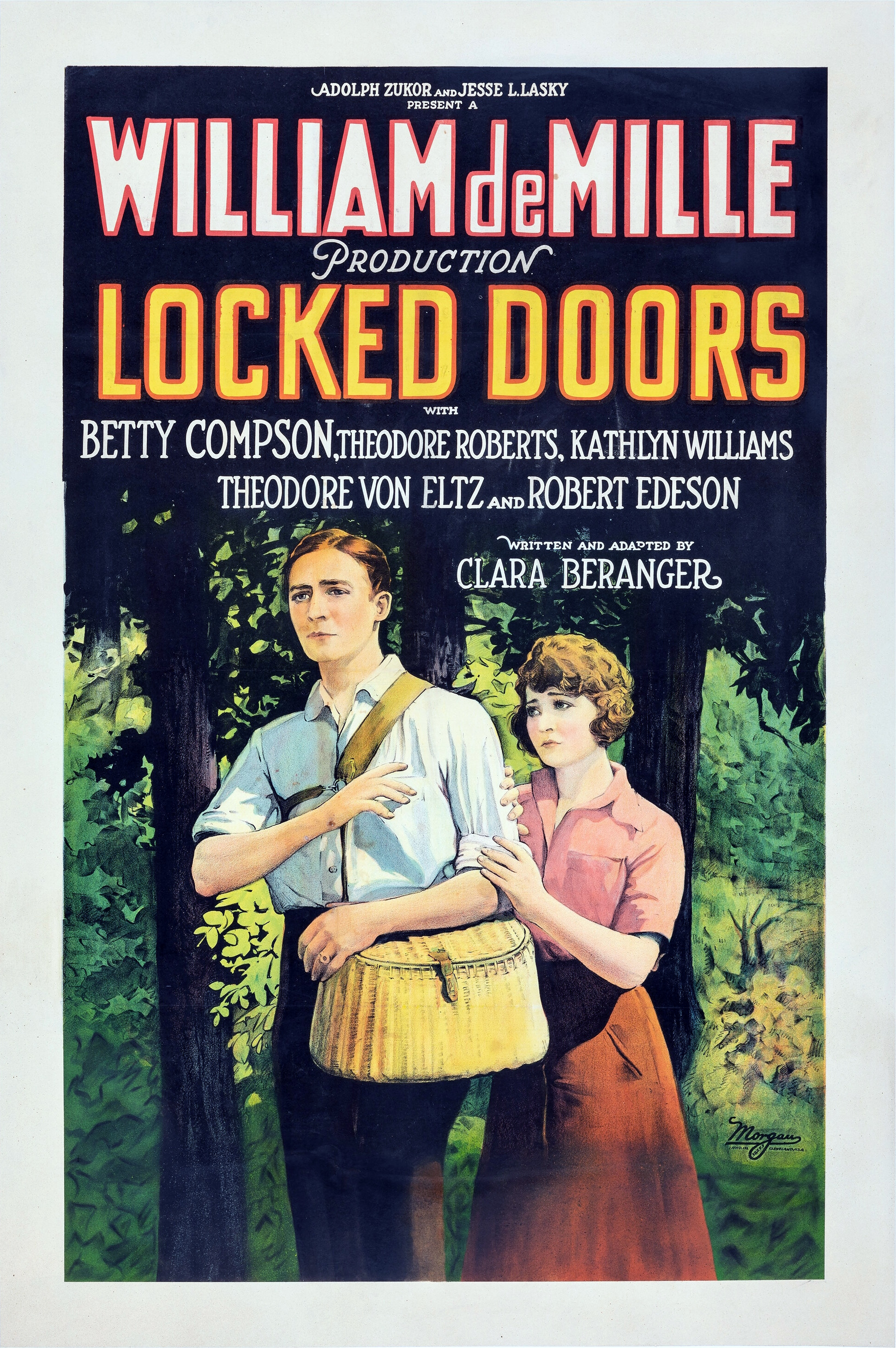
- Theatrical release poster
- Directed by: William C. deMille
- Written by: Clara Beranger (story, scenario)
- Starring: Betty Compson
- Cinematography: L. Guy Wilky
- Edited by: Adelaide Cannon
- Distributed by: Paramount Pictures
- Release date: January 5, 1925 (U.S.)
- Running time: 70 minutes
- Country: United States
- Languages: Silent (English intertitles)

Locked Doors is a 1925 American silent romantic drama film directed by William C. deMille and starring Betty Compson. It was produced by Famous Players–Lasky and distributed by Paramount Pictures.

== Plot ==
As described in a review in a film magazine, Mary is married to architect Norman Carter who is many years her senior. Norman also provides a home for her invalid father who spends his time cheating at solitaire and trying to get a drink. She respects him but does not love him although he is intensely in love with her. While visiting friends at a lodge in the mountains, she strikes up an acquaintance and then deliberately flirts with John Talbot, and they fall madly in love with another. Norman gives John a job at his office and, after discovering that John is in love with some married woman, invites him to his home to allow him to forget about her. Under the watchful eyes of the husband and his sister Laura, John and Mary pretend they have never met before and try to hide their love, but it grows more intense. When Norman discovers the truth, he decides to send John to work on a project in Italy. John recklessly goes to see Mary in her room to bid her farewell when a fire breaks out in the house. John cannot get out without now compromising Mary, and she refuses to leave him, so they stay there in her bedroom. Intending to save his wife, Norman breaks into the room and finds them together. The husband rescues Mary and John manages to get back to his own room. The next day, realizing that he will never have the love of his wife, Norman tells them that, while John is in Italy, he will arrange so that Mary can get her divorce so that they will be happy.

== Cast ==
- Betty Compson as Mary Reid Carter
- Theodore Roberts as Mr. Reid
- Kathlyn Williams as Laura Carter
- Theodore von Eltz as John Talbot
- Robert Edeson as Norman Carter
- Elmo Billings as Mickey
- Harry Stubbs as undetermined role (uncredited)
- Rosalind Byrne as undetermined role (uncredited)

== Preservation ==
Locked Doors is currently presumed lost. In February of 2021, the film was cited by the National Film Preservation Board on their Lost U.S. Silent Feature Films list.
