= The Only Son (1914 film) =

1914 film

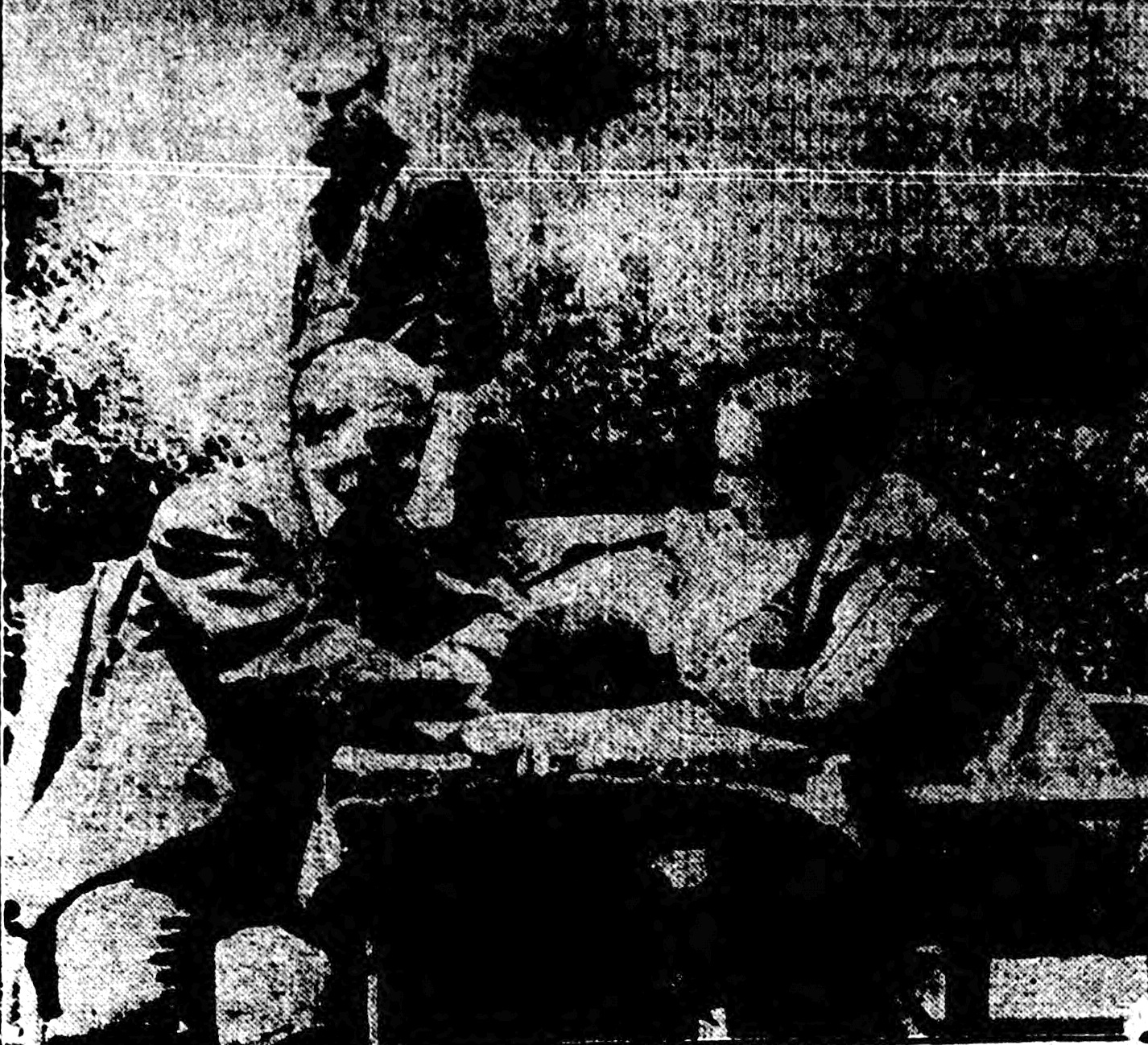
- Publicity photo published in a contemporary newspaper.
- Directed by: Oscar Apfel; Cecil B. DeMille; William C. deMille; Thomas N. Heffron
- Based on: The Only Son; 1911 play by Winchell Smith
- Starring: James Blackwell
- Distributed by: Famous Players–Lasky
- Release date: June 15, 1914
- Running time: 50 minutes
- Country: United States
- Language: Silent with English intertitles

The Only Son is a lost 1914 American silent drama film directed by Oscar Apfel and Cecil B. DeMille. The film is based on the play of the same name by Winchell Smith and stars James Blackwell.

== Cast ==
- James Blackwell as Thomas Brainerd, Sr.
- A. MacMillan as Henry Thompson
- Thomas W. Ross as Thomas Brainerd, Jr.
- Jane Darwell as Mrs. Brainerd
- Merta Carpenter as Gertrude Brainerd
- Arthur Collins as Jim Tompkins
- J.P. Wild as Charles Lester
- Fred Starr as Collins
- Milton Brown
