= In 1999 =

1912 play

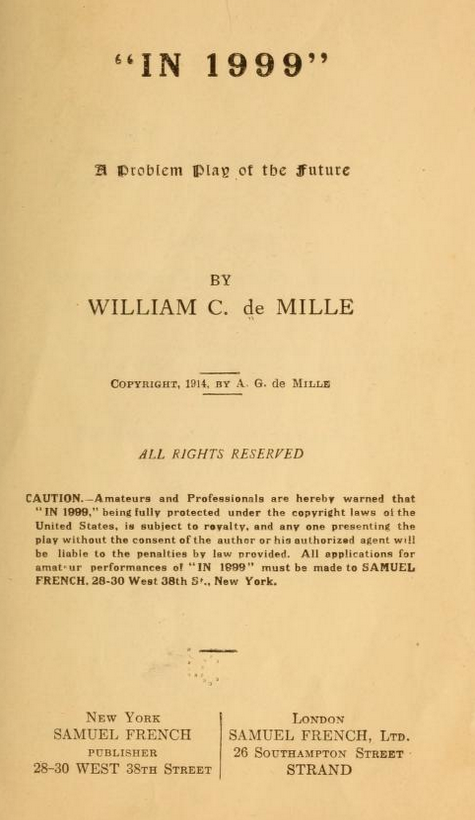
- Cover page
- Original language: English
- Written by: William C. deMille
- Characters: Jean, Rollo, Florence
- Genre: One-act play

Premiere
- Date: 1912

In 1999 is a 1912 one-act comedic short play by William C. deMille, originally produced by Jesse L. Lasky, that was popular upon its release. Its gags are based on a future where gender roles are reversed.

== Production ==
The piece debuted at the Fifth Avenue Theatre on Broadway in New York City on February 5, 1912, and starred Florence Nash, Joseph W. Jefferson (son of Joseph Jefferson), and Minnette Barrett. The sketch was performed for a number of years in theatres throughout the United States.

Considered a satire of the popular problem plays of the day, the sketch is set in 1999 and portrays a world of the future where women and men have reversed roles from 1912, with husbands performing domestic chores and the women spending time at their clubs, and tells the tale of a love triangle with the typical speeches reversed by gender. It proved particularly popular with female audience members.

== Lawsuits ==
The sketch was also popular enough to be stolen and fought over. Variety magazine reported in July 1912 that "the Meymotts" had copied the play, after Lasky has rejected an offer for the English rights, and presented it in England under the title In the Future, and also copyrighted it there first.

Iza Hampton Barnes, an actress, also sued Lasky, deMille, and the three actors, claiming In 1999 was stolen from her sketch titled The Woman of Tomorrow. DeMille's defense to Barnes' suit claimed that the gender-reversal concept existed in "numerous writings and compositions" predating 1910, and that In 1999 was first written by deMille while he was in college in 1899, and named Rollo.
