= The Cheater (film) =

1920 film directed by Henry Otto

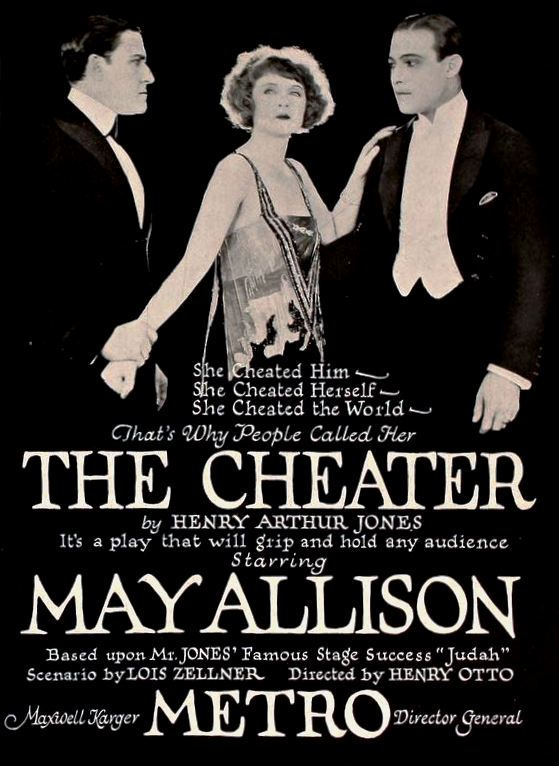
- Directed by: Henry Otto
- Written by: Lois Zellner
- Based on: Judah by Henry Arthur Jones
- Produced by: Maxwell Karger
- Starring: May Allison
- Cinematography: W. M. Edmond
- Distributed by: Metro Pictures
- Release date: June 7, 1920
- Running time: 6 reels
- Country: USA
- Language: Silent...English intertitles

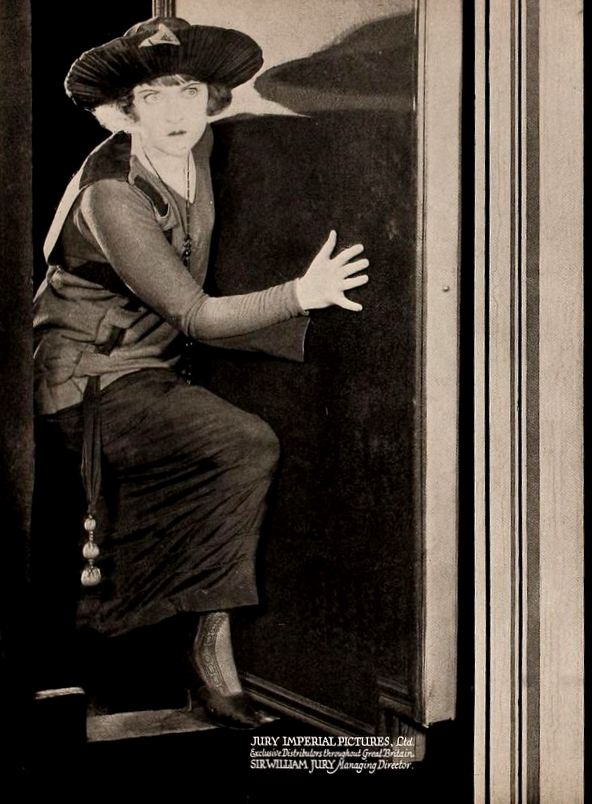
scene with May Allison.

The Cheater is a lost 1920 silent film drama directed by Henry Otto and starring May Allison. It was released by Metro Pictures.

== Cast ==
- May Allison - Lilly Meany
- King Baggot - Lord Asgarby
- Frank Currier - Peg Meany
- Harry von Meter - Bill Tozer (*as Harry Van Meter)
- May Giraci - Eve Asgarby (*as May Geraci)
- Percy Challenger - Mr. Prall
- Lucille Ward - Mrs. Prall
- P. Dempsey Tabler - Doctor
- Alberta Lee - Nurse

uncredited

- Rudolph Valentino - Extra
