= For Better, for Worse (1919 film) =

1919 film

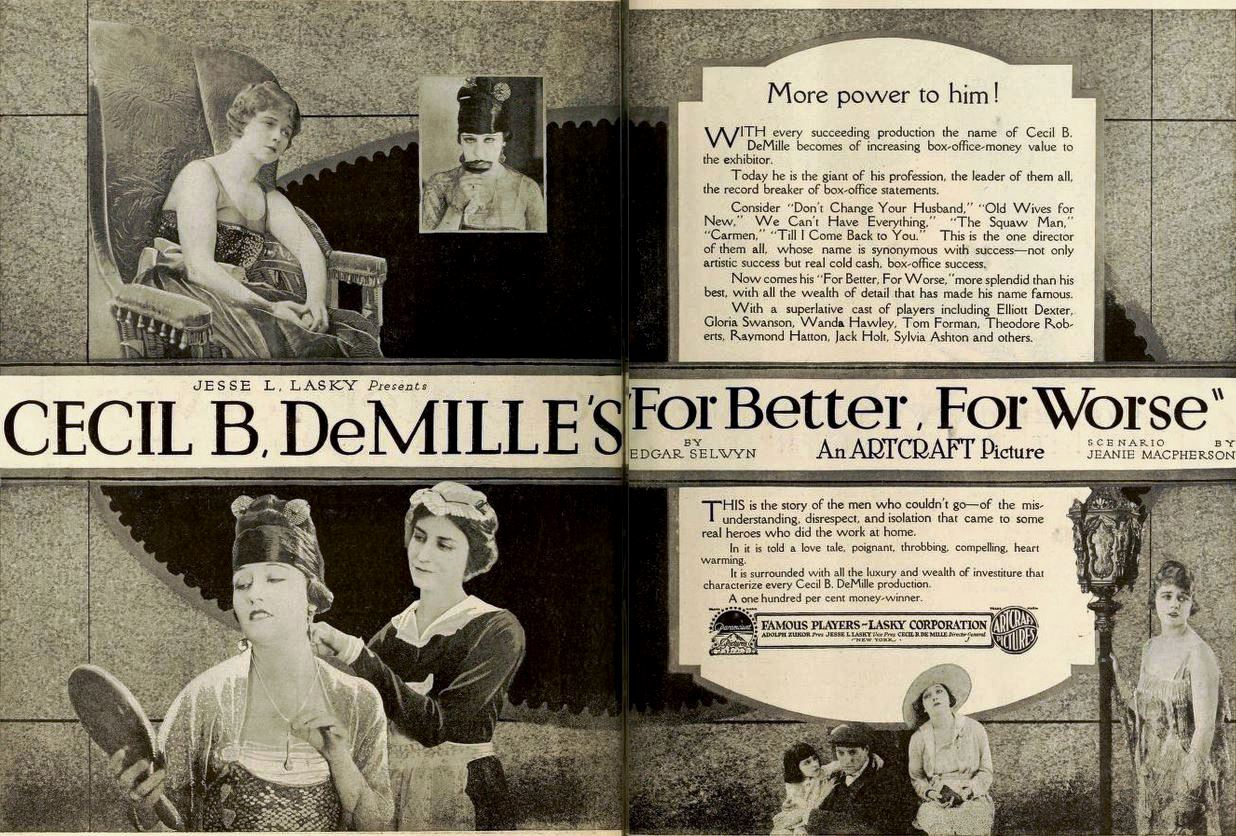
- Ad for For Better, for Worse from a 1919 issue of Moving Picture World
- Directed by: Cecil B. DeMille; Sam Wood (asst. director)
- Written by: William C. deMille (adaptation); Jeanie MacPherson (scenario)
- Based on: For Better, for Worse (unproduced play) by Edgar Selwyn
- Produced by: Cecil B. DeMille; Jesse L. Lasky
- Starring: Elliott Dexter; Gloria Swanson
- Cinematography: Alvin Wyckoff
- Edited by: Anne Bauchens
- Production company: Famous Players–Lasky/Artcraft
- Distributed by: Paramount Pictures
- Release date: April 27, 1919
- Running time: 70 minutes (7 reels; 7,105 feet)
- Country: United States
- Language: Silent (English intertitles)
- Budget: $1,260.93
- Box office: $256,072.97

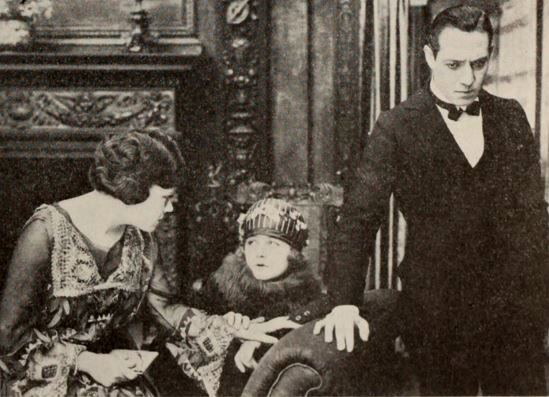
Wanda Hawley Gloria Swanson, and Elliott Dexter

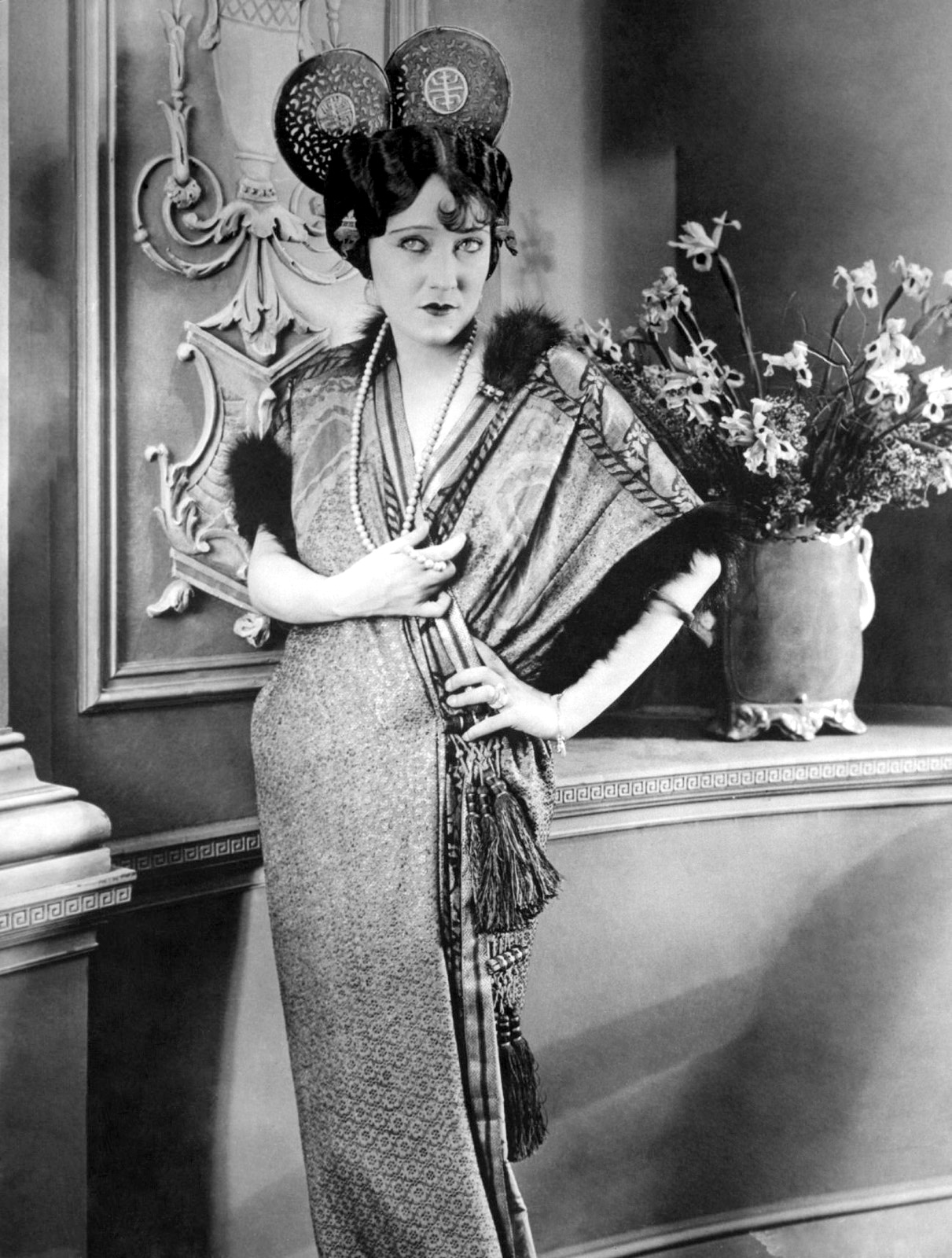
Gloria Swanson

For Better, for Worse is a 1919 American silent drama film directed by Cecil B. DeMille and starring Gloria Swanson. The film was the second of four "marriage films" directed by DeMille and the second DeMille film starring Gloria Swanson. For Better, for Worse was adapted for the screen by William C. deMille. Jeanie MacPherson wrote the film's scenario.

== Plot ==
As described in a film magazine, Dr. Edward Meade and his close friend Richard Burton are rivals for the hand of Sylvia Norcross, but both men have volunteered to fight in the war. Although Sylvia favors Dr. Meade, she is proud of both of them. As Edward is putting on his uniform, the head of the children's hospital where he works comes to him and convinces him that his true duty lies there, where his surgeon's skill is most needed. Edward resigns his commission, and Sylvia, disgusted as what she perceives as cowardice, marries Richard the day he is leaving with his regiment for Europe. Richard conceals his hurt and devotes himself to the hospital. Betty Hoyt, a friend of Sylvia, also hides her disappointment as she had feelings for Richard. Sylvia uses her time to aid poor families on New York's Lower East Side, and coming home one night runs down a little girl with her car, who turns out to be an orphan as her father had died at the front in Europe.

Sylvia takes the child to recuperate in her home, and learns the child may never walk again. Seeking out the best surgeon, Sylvia finds the only one who has not gone to fight is Dr. Meade. Edward consents and does his best for the child. Meanwhile, Richard at the front line calmly faces possible death. He is wounded in battle, and finds that he has lost his right hand and severely injured the left side of his face. He then asks a friend to tell his wife that he had been killed in battle. Back in New York, Sylvia has come to better understand Edward's character as he cares for the orphan. When news of Richard's death comes, she turns to Edward, the man she has always loved. Betty accuses her of loving Edward, and she cannot deny it. After waiting a suitable amount of time, Edward asks Sylvia to marry him, and she consents. On the day the engagement is to be announced, Richard returns home, having received a new prosthetic hand and some work to his face. The guests hail Richard as a hero while Edward, facing the situation, quietly leaves. Sylvia tries to take up her life with Richard again, and when they are alone, Richard is beaming with joy but she cannot hide her aversion to his wounds. Quick to understand, Richard bitterly reproaches her and leaves. Meeting Betty in the hall, he tells her what happened, and she happily says that she can take Sylvia's place. Richard accepts this as he embraces her. Sylvia goes to see Edward at his home and finds him in his chair with the orphan on his lap. She says that she tried to stay with Richard, but her love for Edward was too strong. Richard, who followed Sylvia, arrives, and there ensues a conversation that results in peace and contentment for the four parties instead of ruined lives.

== Cast ==
- Elliott Dexter as Dr. Edward Meade
- Tom Forman as Richard Burton
- Gloria Swanson as Sylvia Norcross
- Sylvia Ashton as Sylvia's Aunt
- Raymond Hatton as Bud
- Theodore Roberts as Hospital Head
- Wanda Hawley as Betty Hoyt
- Winter Hall as Doctor
- Jack Holt as Crusader
- Fred Huntley as Colonial Soldier
- Mae Giraci as Little Girl (uncredited)

For Better, For Worse (1919)

== Production notes ==
Filming began on January 27, 1919, with a budget of $1,260.93. Filming completed on March 24, 1919. The film premiered on April 27, 1919, and grossed $256,072.97.

== Preservation ==
A complete 35 mm print of For Better, for Worse is held by the George Eastman Museum in Rochester, New York.

== See also ==
- The House That Shadows Built (1931 promotional film by Paramount)
