= Nobody's Widow =

1927 film directed by Donald Crisp

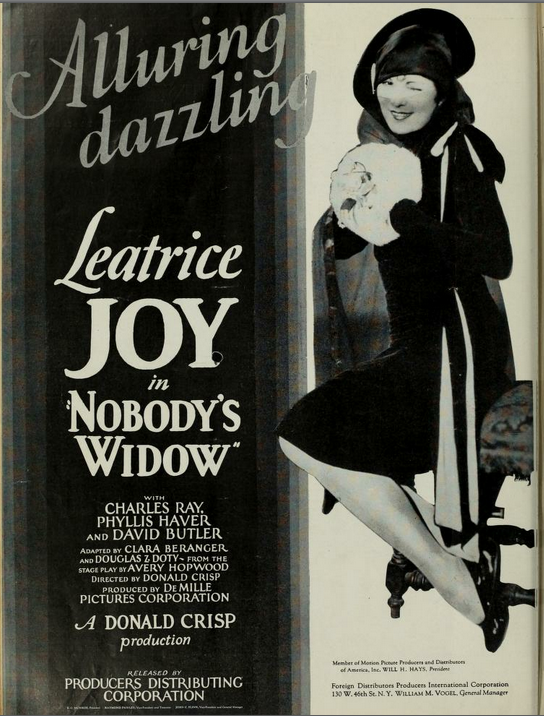
- Directed by: Donald Crisp
- Written by: Clara Beranger; Douglas Z. Doty; Avery Hopwood (play)
- Starring: Leatrice Joy; Charles Ray; Phyllis Haver
- Cinematography: Arthur C. Miller
- Production company: DeMille Pictures Corporation
- Distributed by: Producers Distributing Corporation
- Release date: January 12, 1927
- Running time: 67 minutes
- Country: United States
- Languages: Silent; English intertitles

Nobody's Widow is a 1927 American silent comedy film directed by Donald Crisp and starring Leatrice Joy, Charles Ray and Phyllis Haver. It is an adaptation of a 1910 play of the same title by Avery Hopwood.

== Plot ==
After discovering that her husband has been unfaithful to her, an upper-class English woman moves to America to stay with a friends and pretends to have been widowed and attracts several suitors. Things become complicated when her husband arrives and courts her using an alias.

== Cast ==
- Leatrice Joy as Roxanna Smith
- Charles Ray as Honorable John Clayton
- Phyllis Haver as Betty Jackson
- David Butler as Ned Stevens
- Dot Farley as Roxanna's Maid
- Fritzi Ridgeway as Mademoiselle Renée
- Charles West as Valet

== Preservation ==
Nobody's Widow is currently presumed lost. In February of 2021, the film was cited by the National Film Preservation Board on their Lost U.S. Silent Feature Films list.

== Bibliography ==
- James Fisher & Felicia Hardison Londré. The A to Z of American Theater: Modernism. Rowman & Littlefield, 2009.
