= Tenth Avenue (film) =

1928 film

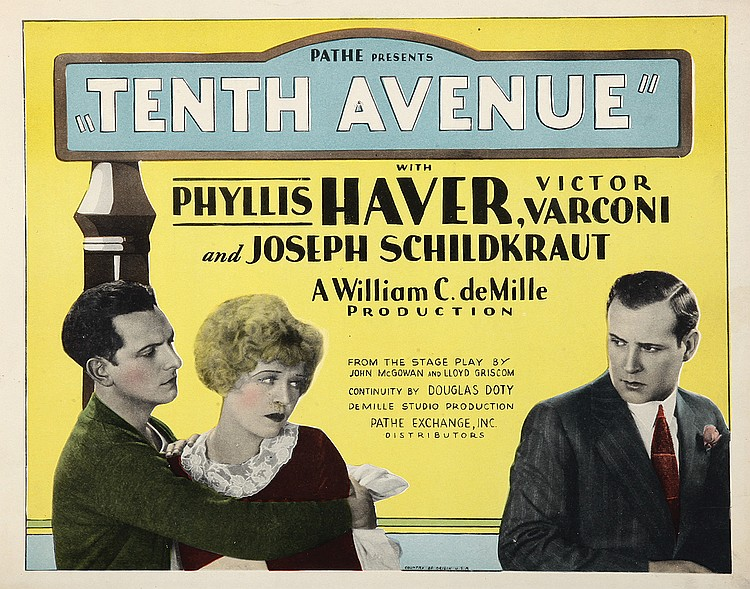
- Directed by: William C. deMille
- Written by: Lloyd Carpenter Griscom; Jack McGowan; Douglas Z. Doty; John W. Krafft
- Starring: Phyllis Haver; Victor Varconi; Joseph Schildkraut
- Cinematography: David Abel
- Edited by: Adelaide Cannon
- Production company: DeMille Pictures Corporation
- Distributed by: Pathé Exchange
- Release date: August 6, 1928
- Running time: 70 minutes
- Country: United States
- Languages: Silent; English intertitles

Tenth Avenue, also known as Hell's Kitchen, is a lost 1928 American silent drama film directed by William C. deMille and starring Phyllis Haver, Victor Varconi and Joseph Schildkraut.

== Cast ==
- Phyllis Haver as Lyla Mason
- Victor Varconi as Bob Peters
- Joseph Schildkraut as Joe Ross
- Louis Natheaux as Fink
- Robert Edeson as Detective Ed Burton
- Ethel Wales as Ma Mason
- Casson Ferguson as Curley
- Ernie Adams as Benny

== Preservation ==
With no holdings located in archives, Tenth Avenue is considered a lost film.

== Bibliography ==
- Goble, Alan. The Complete Index to Literary Sources in Film. Walter de Gruyter, 1999.
