= Guy Oliver =

American actor (1878-1932)

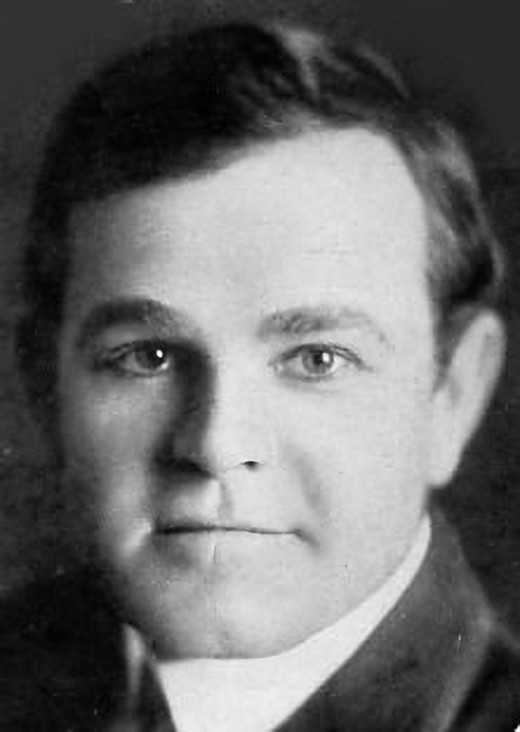
- Born: George Guy Oliver; September 25, 1878; Chicago, Illinois, U.S.
- Died: September 1, 1932 (aged 53); Hollywood, California, U.S.
- Occupation: Actor
- Years active: 1911–1931

George Guy Oliver (September 25, 1878 – September 1, 1932) was an American actor. He appeared in at least 189 silent film era motion pictures and 32 talkies in character roles between 1911 and 1931. His obituary gives him credit for at least 600. He directed three films in 1915.

== Early years ==
Oliver was born in Chicago, Illinois, the son of J. O. and Beno Oliver, on September 25, 1878. His father bought a music store in Lamar, Missouri in 1891, and a few years later he formed the Lamar Ladies' Silver Cornet Band. Oliver was playing cornet in the group when he was 6 years old, and his mother was the conductor. Later the family formed The Musical Olivers, a troupe that "played Carthage, Springfield, Joplin, Rolla, and nearly every other town and city in Missouri". Later the group affiliated with the Southern Carnival Company and traveled across the United States. His mother's death ended the family performances.

== Career ==
After Oliver's mother died, he began acting with the Fennberg Stock Company in New England. Later, he and Joe Keaton teamed in a "burlesque boxing act" that they performed in amusement parks around the United States Oliver followed that routine with a vaudeville act in which he sang and whistled.

After "an unsuccessful engagement with a stock company in Rome, Georgia," in 1908 he began working for Lubin Studios in Philadelphia, earning $3.00 a day. He also worked for Eclair, Kinemacolor and the Selig Polyscope Company before he joined Jesse L. Lasky's company in California in 1916. Oliver appeared in at least 18 films starring Wallace Reid, and in those made by many other stars at Paramount. In 1931 his health led him to retire, but the studio continued to pay him.

== Personal life and death ==
Oliver was married on January 31, 1906, in Jackson, Mississippi. He and his wife, Elinor, had a son, Parker, and a daughter, Georgie. He died at Hollywood Hospital in Hollywood, California.

== Partial filmography ==
- Saved From the Titanic (1912, Short) - Jack's pal
- Robin Hood (1912, Short) - Much
- The Adventures of Kathlyn (1913)
- Memories (1914) - Professor Scott
- A Just Punishment (1914, Short) - Bob Preston - the Husband
- The Carpet from Bagdad (1915) - Horace Wadsworth
- His Father's Rifle (1915, Short) - Kirke Warren
- The Circular Staircase (1915) - Halsey Innes
- I'm Glad My Boy Grew Up to Be a Soldier (1915) - Frank Archer
- Thou Shalt Not Covet (1916) - My Neighbor
- Into the Primitive (1916) - Thomas Blake
- The Valiants of Virginia (1916) - Major Bristow
- Nan of Music Mountain (1917)
- Rimrock Jones (1918)
- The Whispering Chorus (1918)
- Old Wives for New (1918)
- Such a Little Pirate (1918)
- The Squaw Man (1918)
- The Dub (1919)
- Don't Change Your Husband (1919)
- The Poor Boob (1919)
- Rustling A Bride (1919)
- Putting It Over (1919)
- Secret Service (1919)
- Told in the Hills (1919)
- The Lottery Man (1919)
- Double Speed (1920)
- The Round-Up (1920)
- The Sins of Rosanne (1920)
- What Every Woman Knows (1921)
- The City of Silent Men (1921)
- Too Much Speed (1921)
- Moonlight and Honeysuckle (1921)
- Fool's Paradise (1921)
- The Little Minister (1921)
- Across the Continent (1922)
- Pink Gods (1922)
- Manslaughter (1922)
- The Covered Wagon (1923)
- The Woman With Four Faces (1923)
- Hollywood (1923) cameo
- To the Last Man (1923)
- The Cheat (1923)
- The Dawn of a Tomorrow (1924)
- Changing Husbands (1924)
- The Air Mail (1925)
- A Woman of the World (1925)
- The Eagle of the Sea (1926)
- The Mysterious Rider (1927)
- Nevada (1927)
- Shootin' Irons (1927)
- Feel My Pulse (1928)
- Hot News (1928)
- The Docks of New York (1928)
- Avalanche (1928)
- Three Weekends (1928)
- Sunset Pass (1929)
- Stairs of Sand (1929)
- Woman Trap (1929)
- The Light of Western Stars (1930)
- The Devil's Holiday (1930)
- Murder by the Clock (1931)
- The Lawyer's Secret (1931)
- I Take This Woman (1931)
- Up Pops the Devil (1931)
