= Baby Lillian Wade =

American child actress (1907–1990)

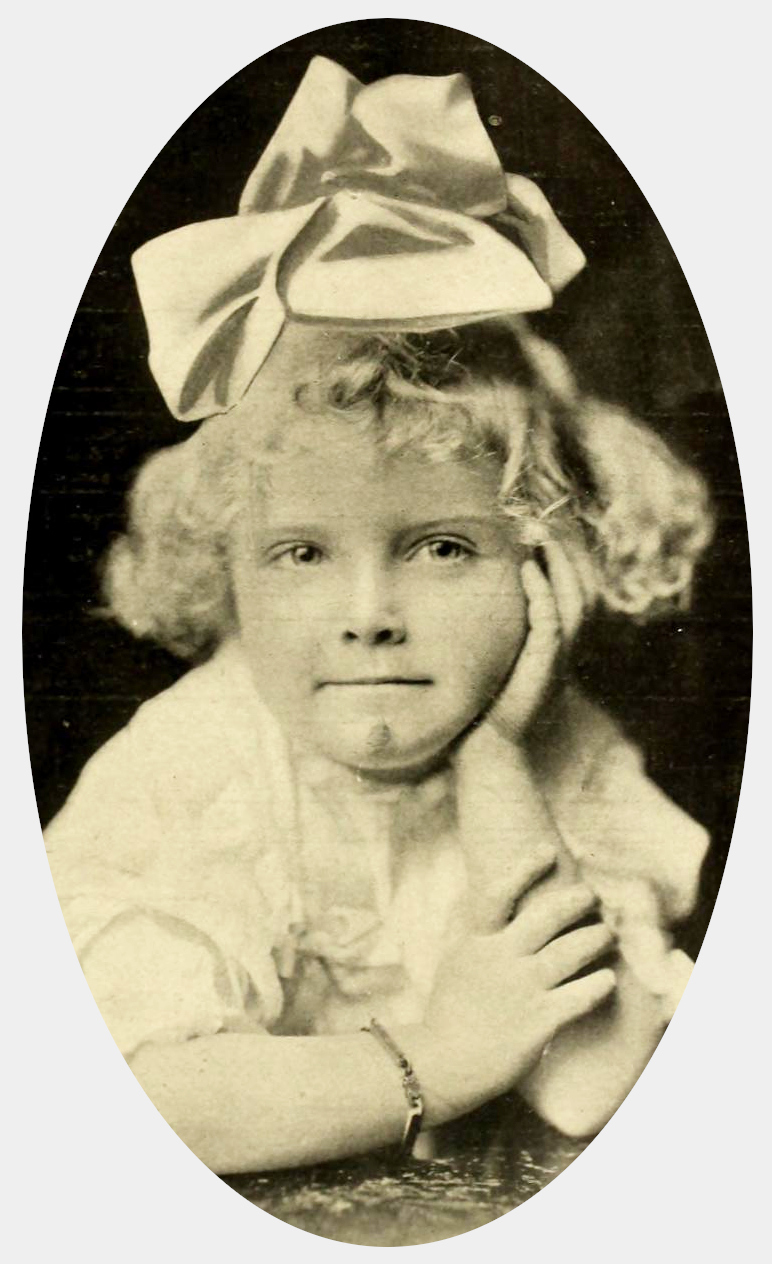
- Born: July 7, 1907; Arapahoe County, Colorado, U.S.
- Died: May 5, 1990 (aged 82); Los Angeles, California, U.S.
- Occupation: Actress

"Baby" Lillian Wade (July 7, 1907 – May 5, 1990) was an American child actress who performed in silent films.

== Biography ==
Lillian Wade lived in Long Beach, California and began her career at age two.

She was professionally known as "Baby Lillian Wade" and was considered William Selig's top child actress. Scenes she performed with animals, including leopard and lion cubs, received critical attention.

A review of King of the Forest (1912) called her "one of the most witching, winsome, and attractive miniature actresses ever engaged on motion picture work". A review of The False Friend (1913) said she handled her part with "unusual skill".

== Selected filmography ==
- Kings of the Forest (1912)
- A Little Child Shall Lead Them (1913)
- Love Before Ten (1913)
- Wamba, A Child of the Jungle (1913)
- When Lillian Was Little Red Riding Hood (1913)
- In God We Trust (1913)
- A Child of the Sea (1913)
- The False Friend (1913)
