= Florence Nash =

American actress and author (1888–1950)

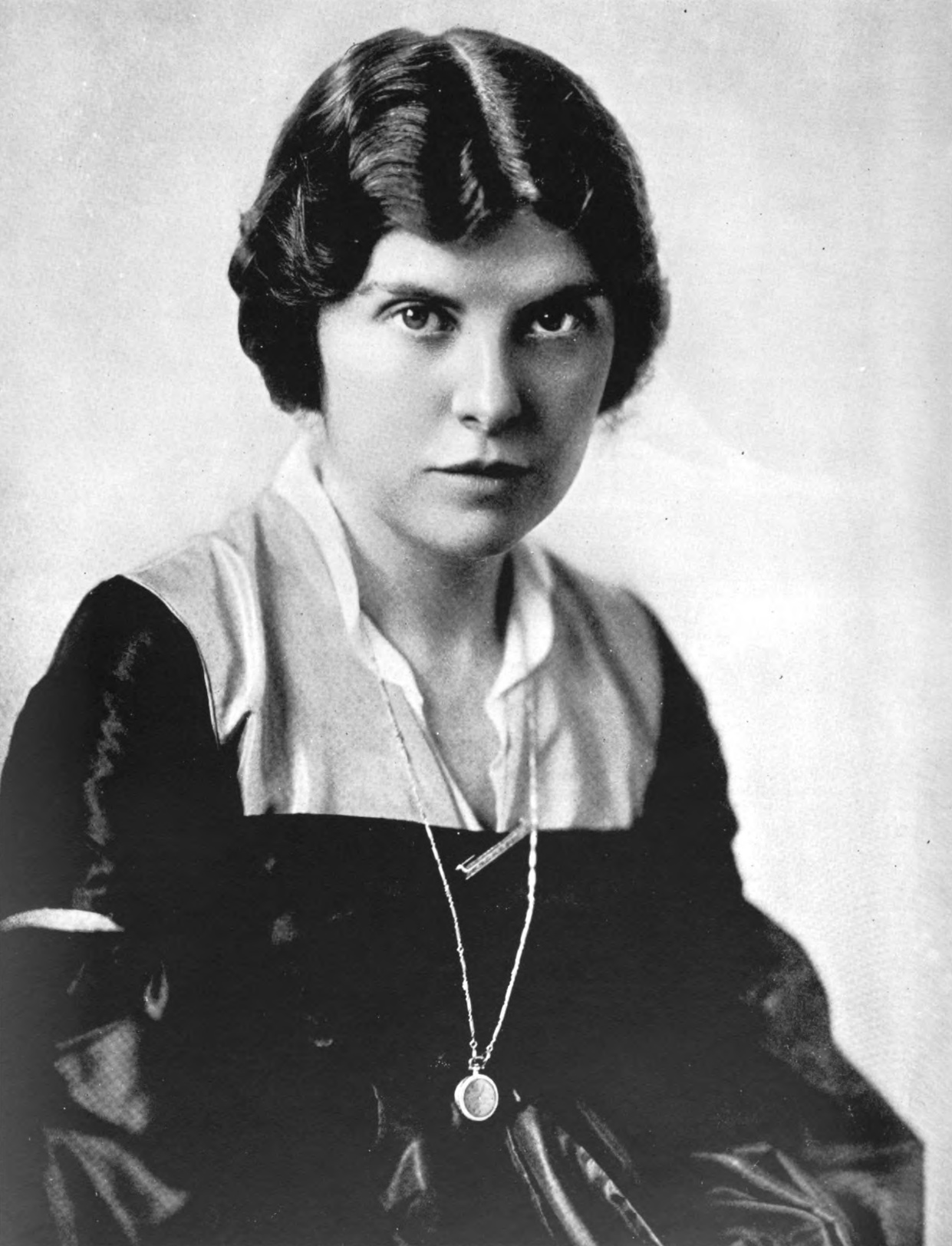
- Nash in 1916
- Born: Florence Ryan; October 2, 1888; Troy, New York, U.S.
- Died: April 2, 1950 (aged 61); Hollywood, California, U.S.
- Occupations: Actress; Author
- Years active: 1907–1939
- Known for: The Women; In 1999
- Relatives: Mary Nash (sister)

Florence Nash (née Ryan) (October 2, 1888 — April 2, 1950) was an American actress and author. She was the sister of a theater and movie actress, Mary Nash.

== Early life ==
Florence was born to James H. and Ellen Frances (née McNamara) Ryan. She and her sister adopted the surname of their stepfather, Philip F. Nash, a vaudeville booking executive, who married their mother after the death of their father, a lawyer.

== Career ==
She began her acting career in 1907 and had her first major success in 1912, playing Aggie Lynch in Within the Law. She was a well-known stage actress and vaudeville comedienne through the 1930s, appearing in sketches including In 1999). She later moved to Hollywood to pursue a film career. Her most notable role was as "Nancy Blake" in the 1939 MGM blockbuster The Women.

She also was the author of a book of verse, June Dusk, published in 1918.

== Death ==
After her retirement from acting in 1939, she spent the next decade living in Hollywood, California, where she died on April 2/3, 1950.

== Filmography ==
Poster	Flim	Role	Year	Ref.
	Springtime	Madeline De Vallette	1914	
	It's a Great Life	Ma Emmy Barclay	1935	
	The Women	Nancy Blake	1939	
