= Kathlyn Williams =

American actress

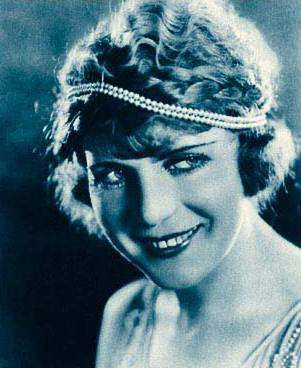
- Williams in 1924
- Born: Kathleen Mabel Williams; May 31, 1879; Butte, Montana, U.S.
- Died: September 23, 1960 (aged 81); Hollywood, California, U.S.
- Education: Montana Wesleyan University; American Academy of Dramatic Arts
- Occupation: Actress
- Spouse(s): Harry Kainer (m.1903–div.1909); Frank R. Allen (m.1913–div.1914); Charles Eyton (m.1916–div.1931)
- Children: 1

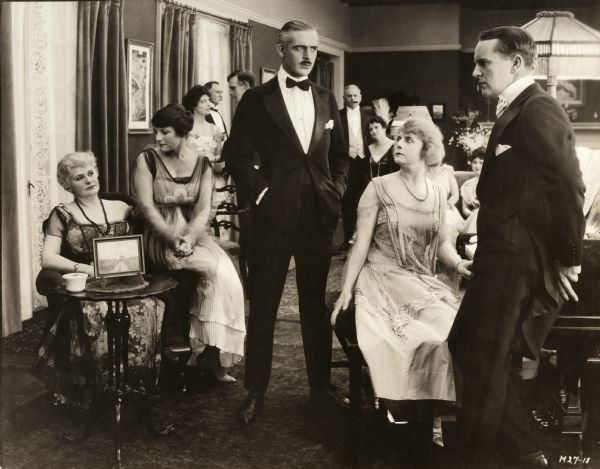
Wallace Reid, center, glares at Joe King, right, as Kathlyn Williams, seated between them, watches in a scene still for the 1917 silent drama Big Timber.

Kathlyn Williams (born Kathleen Mabel Williams, May 31, 1879 – September 23, 1960) was an American actress, known for her blonde beauty and daring antics, who performed on stage as well as in early silent film. She began her career onstage in her hometown of Butte, Montana, where she was sponsored by local copper magnate William A. Clark to study acting in New York City. She later appeared in numerous films between 1910 and 1932 before retiring from acting. Williams died of a heart attack in Los Angeles at age 81.

== Early life and career ==
Williams was born in Butte, Montana, the only child born to Joseph Edwin "Frank" Williams, a boarding house proprietor, and Mary C. Boe (1846–1908) of Welsh and Norwegian descent. Other sources cite 1885 and 1888 as potential years of birth. However, she is listed on the 1880 United States Census as being one year old as of June 1, 1880.

Williams displayed an early interest in becoming an actress during her youth in Butte, which led her to become a member of a community thespian group. She also joined the Woman's Relief Corps that allowed her to showcase her vocal prowess at local recitals. Although she was known for having an adequate singing voice, acting became Williams' main vocation. Williams attended Montana Wesleyan University in Helena during the late 1890s and graduated in 1901, where she excelled in elocution and voice, and her performances were highly praised. In May 1899, she recited "The Gypsy Flower Girl" at her university's annual competition. On May 29, 1900, she received a gold medal for her recitation of "Old Mother Goose" at Wesleyan's declamation contest. She lost her father around 1894 when she was a teenager, and her mother remarried Fred Lavoie in 1895. They divorced the next year.

In order to make ends meet, her mother made extra money by renting out homes in nearby Centerville, Montana. Her family was of limited means; therefore, Kathlyn had to rely on the charity of others to pay her way through school; she was sponsored by Butte copper magnate and politician William A. Clark, who paid for her to train at the Sargent School of Acting, better known as the American Academy of Dramatic Arts, in New York City.

In 1900, her friends held a concert at Sutton's Theater for Katie, as she was affectionately called, to gather funds to help pay her college tuition. By 1902, she joined a theater touring group called Norris & Hall and Company where she played Phyllis Ericson in When We Were Twenty One, mostly to good reviews. The play toured across the United States toward the end of 1903.

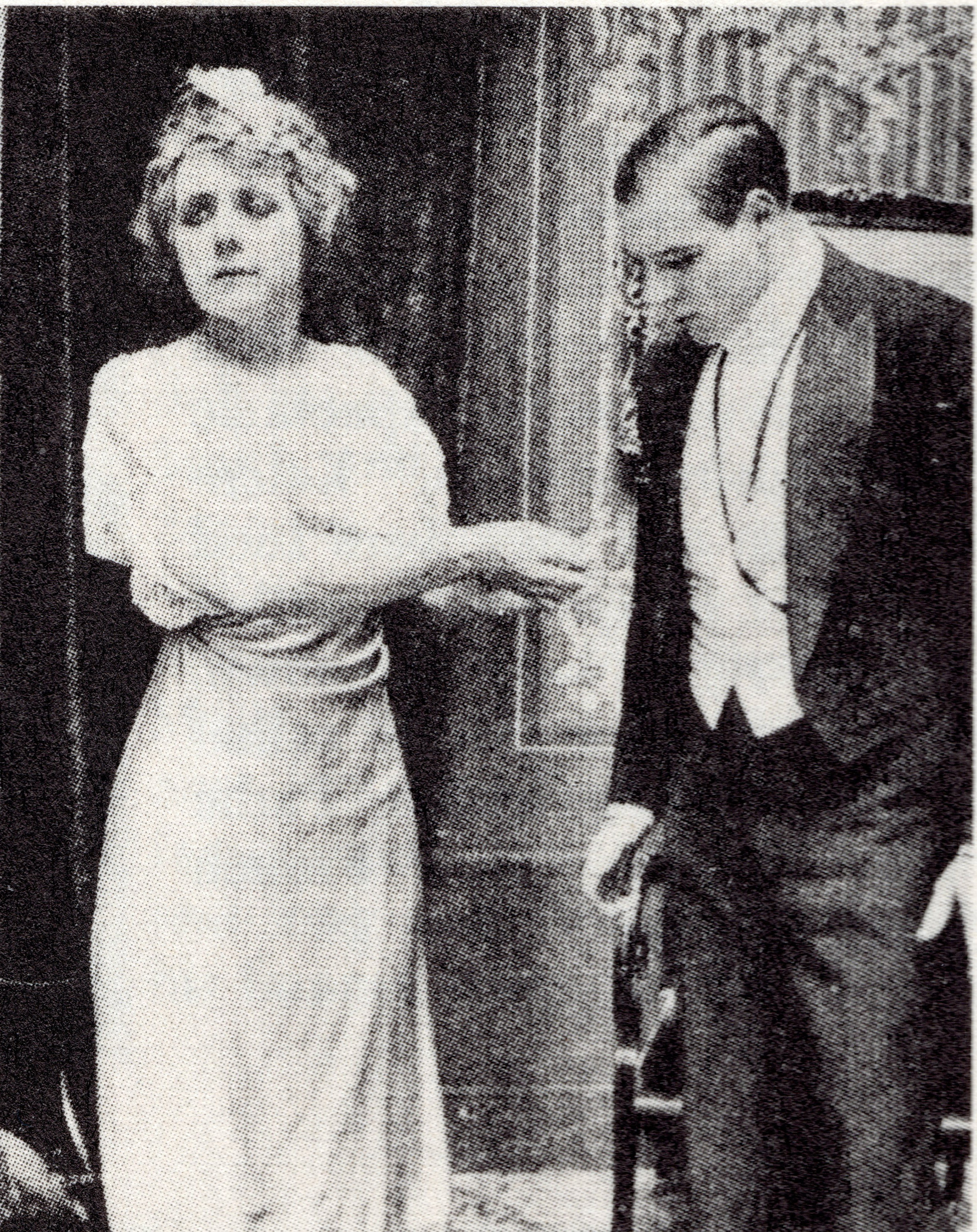
Kathlyn Williams and Harold Lockwood in Harbor Island (1912)

In the January 16, 1903 issue of the Dallas Morning News, an article in Amusements critiqued Williams' performance in "When We Were Twenty-One": "Miss Kathlyn Williams, who assumed the role of Phyllis, is an actress of rare ability, attractiveness, and grace of delivery". Williams began her career with Selig Polyscope Company in Chicago, Illinois and made her first film in 1908 under the direction of Francis Boggs. By 1910, she was transferred to the company's Los Angeles film studio. Williams played "Cherry Malotte" in the first movie based upon Rex Beach's 1906 novel The Spoilers in 1914.

In 1913, she starred in the thirteen-episode serial The Adventures of Kathlyn. She was busy throughout the silent film era, but age and the advent of sound in movies saw her make only five sound films, the last in 1935. Kathlyn evolved from a comedian and serial player in silents to portraying character roles in the early 1930s.

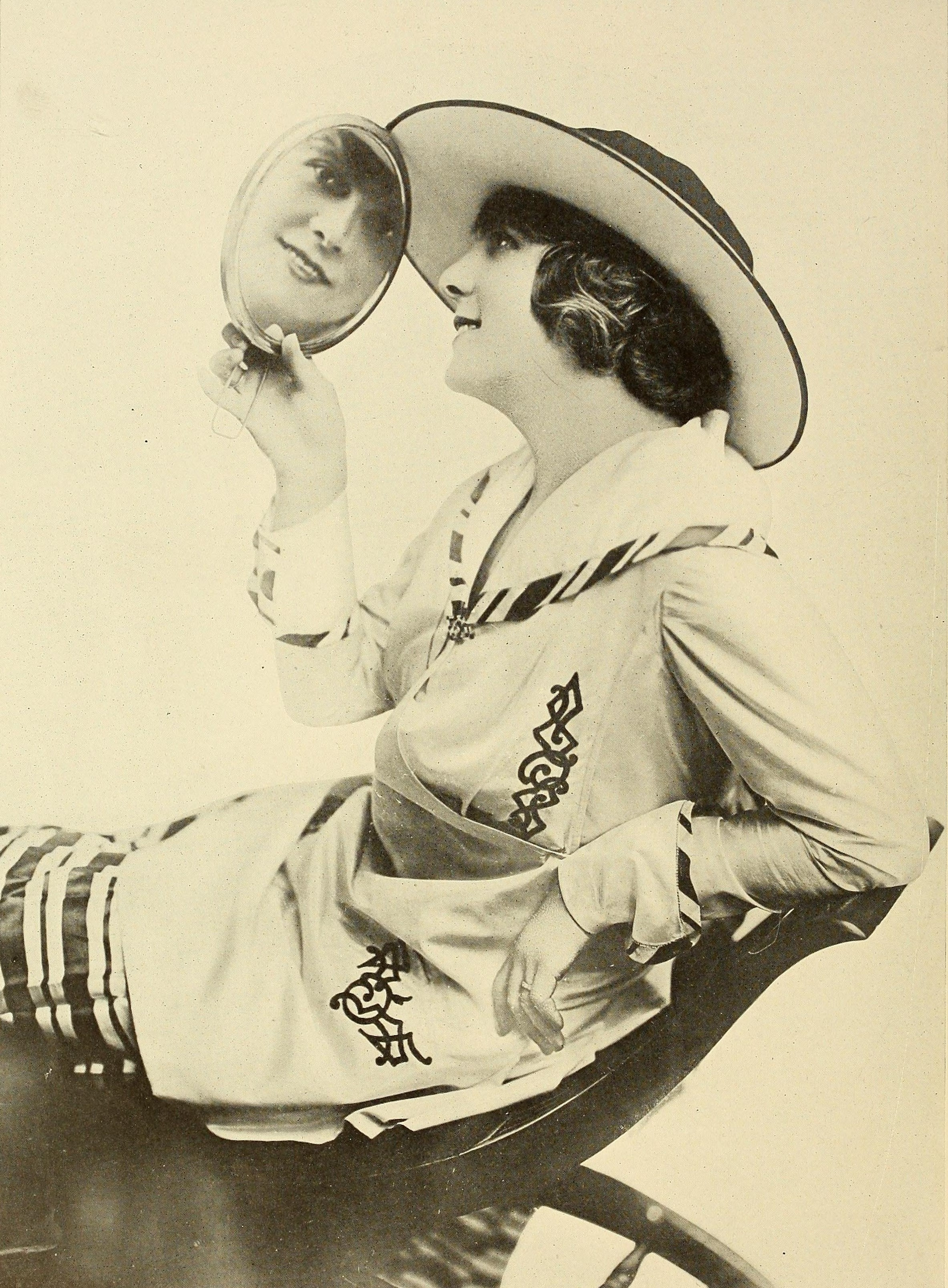
Kathlyn Williams in 1917

== Personal life ==
Williams was married three times. Although many biographies erroneously cite her first husband as being Victor Kainer, he was in fact named Otto H. "Harry" Kainer (1876–1952), who ran an import and export business on Wall Street in New York City. They were wed on October 2, 1903, and their son, Victor Hugo, was born in 1905. The Kainers resided at 301 Nicholas Avenue in Manhattan.

On May 8, 1905, she successfully sued her husband for $20,000 for not paying her $10,000 on the day of their marriage and for every year of their marriage. The case made headlines in newspapers across the country, and made its way to the New York Supreme Court. They supposedly divorced over Kainer's disapproval of his wife having an acting career, and Williams obtained a divorce from Kainer in 1909 in Nevada. After the death of her Norwegian born mother in December 1908 and the failure of her marriage, Williams decided to revive her acting career. By 1910, Williams and her young son uprooted themselves to Los Angeles, where she obtained acting jobs. On March 4, 1913, she married Frank R. Allen, also an actor, but the marriage was a failure from the start and lasted a little over a year. On June 30, 1914, she filed for divorce in Los Angeles and listed desertion as the reason as the failure of their marriage.

She later married Paramount Pictures executive Charles Eyton on June 2, 1916 in Riverside, California. The couple met approximately ten years earlier in Salt Lake City, Utah. Eyton went there to look over a new play. While there he met Kathlyn, who was a member of the Willard Mack stock company. He and Williams had been engaged earlier but a lover's quarrel broke them up. Eyton was an owner of the Oliver Morosco Photoplay Company. On February 25, 1922, her son, Victor, died suddenly at the age of 16 from complications of influenza at Good Samaritan Hospital in Los Angeles, and his remains were cremated. Her son was previously enrolled at Harvard Military Academy before he became a student at Hollywood High School. The Eytons eventually divorced in 1931.

== Later life ==
On December 29, 1949, Williams was involved in a deadly automobile accident, which claimed the life of her friend, Mrs. Mary E. Rose, while they were returning home from a social engagement in Las Vegas. As a result of the accident, Williams lost her right leg. On April 8, 1950, Williams sued the estate of Rose for $136,615, citing negligence and claiming that the automobile had inefficient brakes. In June 1951, Williams accepted the offer of $6,500 from the Rose estate.

== Death ==
Williams died of a heart attack in Hollywood, California in 1960. She was found dead in her bedroom at her 1428 North Crescent Heights apartment where she had lived for nearly 30 years. She was cremated. She bequeathed most of her assets, which amounted to nearly $287,000, to charitable institutions such as The McKinley Industrial Home for Boys, the Motion Picture Relief Fund, and to an orthopedic and children's hospital.

For her contribution to the motion picture industry, Kathlyn Williams has a star on the Hollywood Walk of Fame at 7038 Hollywood Blvd.

== Partial filmography ==
- A Romance of the Western Hills (1910)
- The Merry Wives of Windsor (1910)
- The Fire Chief's Daughter (1910)
- The Girl at the Cupola (1912)
- Harbor Island (1912)
- The Adventures of Kathlyn (1913) *Lost film, although the first episode is extant as well as fragments
- The Spoilers (1914)
- Chip of the Flying U (1914) *Incomplete film
- The Carpet from Bagdad (1915) *Incomplete film
- Sweet Alyssum (1915)
- Thou Shalt Not Covet (1916)
- Big Timber (1917) *Lost film
- The Thing We Love (1918) *Lost film
- The Whispering Chorus (1918)
- We Can't Have Everything (1918) *Lost film
- Her Purchase Price (1919)
- Her Kingdom of Dreams (1919)
- A Girl Named Mary (1919) *Lost film
- The Better Wife (1919)
- Just a Wife (1920)
- The U.P. Trail (1920)
- The Tree of Knowledge (1920)
- Conrad in Quest of His Youth (1920)
- Forbidden Fruit (1921)
- A Man's Home (1921)
- Everything for Sale (1921) *Undetermined/presumably lost
- Morals (1921)
- Hush (1921)
- Clarence (1922) *Lost film
- The World's Applause (1923) *Lost film
- Trimmed in Scarlet (1923)
- The Spanish Dancer (1923)
- Broadway Gold (1923)
- Wanderer of the Wasteland (1924) *Lost film
- The Enemy Sex (1924)
- The Painted Flapper (1924)
- When a Girl Loves (1924)
- Single Wives (1924)
- The City That Never Sleeps (1924) *Lost film
- Locked Doors (1925) *Lost film
- The Wanderer (1925)
- The Best People (1925) *Lost film
- Sally in Our Alley (1927) *Lost film
- Our Dancing Daughters (1928)
- Honeymoon Flats (1928)
- We Americans (1928)
- A Single Man (1929) *Lost film
- The Single Standard (1929)
- Wedding Rings (1929) *Lost film
- Road to Paradise (1930)
- Daddy Long Legs (1931)
- Unholy Love (1932)
