= The Little Adventuress (1927 film) =

1927 film

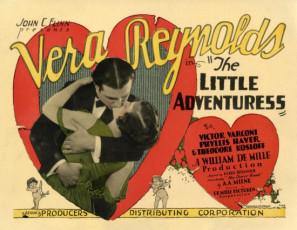
- Directed by: William C. deMille
- Written by: A. A. Milne (play); Clara Beranger
- Produced by: John C. Flinn
- Starring: Vera Reynolds; Phyllis Haver; Victor Varconi
- Cinematography: Charles P. Boyle
- Edited by: Adelaide Cannon
- Production company: DeMille Pictures Corporation
- Distributed by: Producers Distributing Corporation
- Release date: April 11, 1927
- Running time: 70 minutes
- Country: United States
- Languages: Silent; English intertitles

The Little Adventuress is a 1927 American silent comedy film directed by William C. deMille and starring Vera Reynolds, Phyllis Haver, and Victor Varconi. It is based on the play The Dover Road by A. A. Milne. A sound remake Where Sinners Meet was made in 1934.

The film's sets were by the art director Anton Grot, while the costumes were designed by Adrian.

== Cast ==
- Vera Reynolds as Helen Davis
- Phyllis Haver as Victoria Stoddard
- Robert Ober as Leonard Stoddard
- Theodore Kosloff as Antonio Russo
- Victor Varconi as George La Fuente
- Fred Walton as Dominick

== Preservation ==
A complete print of The Little Adventuress is held by the Archives du Film du CNC in Bois d'Arcy.

== Bibliography ==
- Goble, Alan. The Complete Index to Literary Sources in Film. Walter de Gruyter, 1999.
