= Where Sinners Meet =

1934 film by J. Walter Ruben

- Directed by: J. Walter Ruben
- Written by: A.A. Milne (play); H.W. Hanemann
- Produced by: Pandro S. Berman; David Lewis
- Starring: Diana Wynyard; Clive Brook; Billie Burke
- Cinematography: Nicholas Musuraca; David Abel
- Edited by: Jack Hively
- Music by: Max Steiner
- Production company: RKO Pictures
- Distributed by: RKO Pictures
- Release date: 18 May 1934
- Running time: 72 minutes
- Country: United States
- Language: English

Where Sinners Meet is a 1934 American pre-Code romantic comedy film directed by J. Walter Ruben and starring Diana Wynyard, Clive Brook and Billie Burke. It was adapted by writer Henry William Hanemann from Clara Beranger's 1927 movie The Little Adventuress, which in turn was a rewrite from the 1921 British play The Dover Road by A. A. Milne. The film used The Dover Road as a working title prior to its release.

The film's sets were designed by the art directors Perry Ferguson and Van Nest Polglase.

== Plot ==
Leonard and Anne drive along the lovers' road to Dover, intending to embark for Calais and go to Paris. The car breaks down and Saunders takes them to a nearby hotel, which turns out to be a residence with servants, owned by a Mr. Latimer. They are told they cannot leave for seven days so that they can see if a marriage between them will work. The next day, Anne begins to notice things about Leonard that she ignored before. Another couple in the house are about to leave after seven days—Leonard's wife Eustasia and her lover Nicholas.

== Cast ==
- Diana Wynyard as Anne
- Clive Brook as Mr. Latimer
- Billie Burke as Eustasia
- Reginald Owen as Leonard
- Alan Mowbray as Nicholas
- Gilbert Emery as Dominic
- Phyllis Barry as Chambermaid
- Walter Armitage as Joseph
- Katherine Williams as Chambermaid
- Robert Adair as Jacob
- Vernon Steele as Saunders

== Production ==
Producer David Lewis said the film was made to fulfil a commitment to Clive Brooks. RKO needed a project for him and Lews suggested The Dover Road, the rights for which were held by Paramount. Paramount were happy to give them to RKO.

Lewis wrote, "I knew I could make a respectable film of" the play. "It was witty, beautifully written, sophisticated. Predictably, [Padro S] Berman didn’t like it much, but he essentially had a gun at his head. It was placed into production very quickly and made very cheaply, and for my money it was a funny play that made a very amusing movie."

Diana Wynyard was borrowed from MGM.

== Notes ==
- Lewis, David (1993). Curtis, James (ed.). The Creative Producer. Metuchen: Scarecrow Press. ISBN 0-8108-2720-4.
