= The Dover Road (play) =

Leonard and Anne, London, 1922

Dominic and Mr Latimer, London, 1922

The Dover Road is a three-act comedy by A. A. Milne, seen on Broadway in 1921–22 and in the West End in 1922–23. It depicts the dampening effect of close proximity on the ardour of eloping couples when they are forced into sustained exposure to each other's habits and idiosyncrasies.

== Premieres ==
The first production opened at the Bijou Theatre, New York on 23 December 1921 and ran for 204 performances. The play opened at the Haymarket Theatre, London, on 7 June 1922, and ran for 268 performances, until 13 January 1923.

=== Original casts ===
	New York	London
Dominic, the butler	George Riddell	Allan Aynesworth
Mr Latimer	Charles Cherry	Henry Ainley
Leonard	Reginald Mason	Nicholas Hannen
Anne	Winifred Lenihan	Nancy Atkin
Eustasia	Molly Pearson	Athene Seyler
Nicholas	Lyonel Watts	John Deverell
The staff	Phyllis Carrington; Edwin H. Morse; George Nolan; Ann Winslow	Donald Ferguson; Walter Lake; Joyce Kennedy; Kitty Strudwick

== Plot ==
Nicholas and Eustasia, 1922

The scene is the reception-room of Mr Latimer's house, a little way off the Dover Road.

The rich and eccentric Mr Latimer's idea of philanthropy is to waylay eloping couples en route from London to Paris by way of the Dover Road. With the aid of his magisterial and benign butler he keeps them confined together at his house for a week to discover for themselves whether they are truly compatible when exposed to each other's constant company. Leonard (an English peer) is eloping with Anne, a young woman of very modern views. When they are delayed by a series of accidents, contrived by Latimer, from getting to Dover in time to catch the channel boat, they are brought to his house, which they are told is a hotel. Once there, they are courteously, luxuriously but firmly imprisoned together. They rapidly discover each other's irritating habits. Another eloping couple already in enforced residence in Latimer's house consists of Leonard's wife, Eustasia, and Nicholas, a bored young man. They too have fallen into Latimer's trap, and found the urge to elope wearing off. The two couples meet. Leonard is ill with a cold, and Eustasia nurses him in such a solicitous manner that it drives him to distraction. Anne and Nicholas seem on the verge of a liaison, but that too founders. They go their separate ways. Leonard and Nicholas find each other's company congenial, and they decide to use the tickets booked for their abortive elopements and go en garçon on a jaunt to Cannes together. As the play ends, a new eloping couple ring the bell and Latimer's scheme swings into action once again.

== Critical reception ==
Reviewing the Broadway production, Percy Hammond wrote in The New York Tribune that the play was "a quietly twinkling, adult entertainment – one that you will enjoy". In The New York Times the following year, Alexander Woollcott ranked the play with The Truth About Blayds as one of Milne's best plays. After the West End premiere, The Stage described the piece as "one of the most notable English comedies of modern times" and asked why Broadway audiences had been allowed to see it first. The Era commented that the play had "a brilliant first act, rich in comedy, a farcical second act, no less laughter compelling, and a third act in which an element of the fantastic enters", and found the piece "another Haymarket triumph".

== Adaptations ==
A 1927 silent film The Little Adventuress was made. In 1934 the play was adapted into an American film, Where Sinners Meet, directed by J. Walter Ruben and starring Diana Wynyard and Clive Brook. The film's working title was The Dover Road.

BBC Television adapted the play for their anthology series Saturday Playhouse; broadcasting the work in September 1958 with Clive Brook once again portraying Mr. Lattimer, Gene Anderson as Anne, Eleanor Summerfield as Eustasia, Cyril Raymond as Leonard, and Desmond Davis acting as producer.

== Sources ==
- Beckerman, Bernard; Howard Siegman (1973). On Stage: Selected Theater Reviews from The New York Times, 1920–1970. New York: Quadrangle. ISBN 978-0-81-290363-8.
- Wearing, J. P. (2014). The London Stage 1920–1929: A Calendar of Productions, Performers, and Personnel. Lanham, Maryland: Rowman & Littlefield. ISBN 978-0-8108-9302-3.
