= William C. deMille =

American screenwriter and film director (1878–1955)

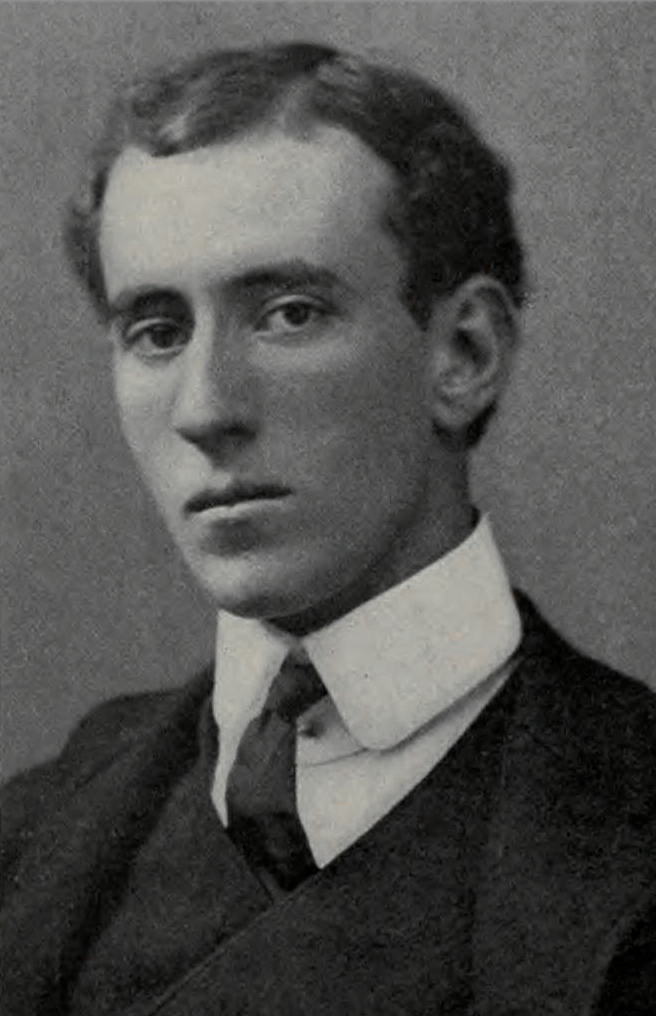
- c. 1904
- Born: William Churchill deMille; July 25, 1878; Washington, North Carolina, U.S.
- Died: March 5, 1955 (aged 76); Playa del Rey, California, U.S.
- Occupations: Screenwriter, film director
- Spouses: Anna George de Mille (m. 1903; div. 1927) Clara Beranger (m. 1928)
- Children: Agnes de Mille; Peggy George; Richard de Mille
- Parent(s): Henry Churchill de Mille; Beatrice deMille
- Relatives: Cecil B. DeMille (brother); Katherine DeMille (niece)

William Churchill deMille (July 25, 1878 – March 5, 1955), also spelled de Mille or De Mille, was an American screenwriter and film director from the silent film era through the early 1930s. He was also a noted playwright prior to moving into film. Once he was established in film he specialized in adapting Broadway plays into silent films.

== Biography ==
DeMille was born in Washington, North Carolina on July 25, 1878, to Henry Churchill de Mille, an actor and playwright from North Carolina, and Matilda Beatrice Samuel, who was also a play and screenwriter. His father was a Christian while his mother was born to a German-Jewish family in Liverpool but converted to her husband's faith.

William was the elder brother of Cecil B. DeMille, who altered the capitalization of his last name when he went to Hollywood, claiming that it fit better on marquees. (William continued to be known as "de Mille", and his daughter Agnes also chose "de Mille".) William received a bachelor's degree from Columbia University followed by graduate studies at the Academy of Dramatic Arts, at schools in Germany, and a second stint at Columbia studying under Brander Matthews.

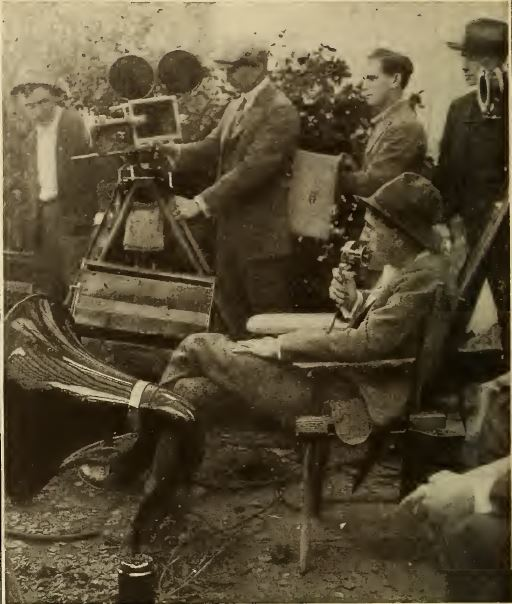
Directing a scene using a "Magna Vox" voice amplification device

In 1903, he married Anna Angela George, the daughter of economist Henry George. Anna and William had two children, Agnes de Mille – named after a younger sister who died in childhood – who became a noted choreographer and Peggy George, who became an actress.

Professionally, their life was stable. In 1905, he became a successful Broadway playwright, following its development in 1904.

William wrote or co-wrote nine plays – one of them with Cecil – produced on Broadway between 1905 and 1913, and another two productions mounted in 1929 and 1936, the latter of which he produced and directed as well.

His first play, Strongheart was eventually released as a movie by his brother as Braveheart (1925). Two of William's works, The Warrens of Virginia (1907) and The Woman (1911) were produced by the flamboyant impresario David Belasco. The former featured future film star Mary Pickford and Cecil, both struggling actors playing minor roles.

He wrote a number of vaudeville sketches including In 1999, Food, Poor Old Jim, The Squealer, The Martyrs, and The Deceivers.

Cecil eventually moved to Hollywood, and William followed. His directorial debut was The Only Son (1914). He was one of the first investors in Neely Dickson's playhouse, the Hollywood Community Theatre, and many of his plays were produced there, featuring Hollywood stars.

== Personal life ==
William C. deMille and Anna Angela George divorced in 1927. One of the writers of Miss Lulu Bett was Clara Beranger, whom deMille married in 1929.

At about this time, he met Lorna Moon, an established New York author from Scotland, who also wrote sophisticated Hollywood comedies.

In 1998, Richard de Mille, who had grown up in Cecil's household, revealed in the memoir My Secret Mother, Lorna Moon that William C. deMille was his father and screenwriter Moon his biological mother. Richard had been adopted by Cecil B. and Constance DeMille to avoid a family scandal.

In addition to his filmmaking fame, William deMille was an early member of the Academy of Motion Picture Arts and Sciences. (His brother was a founding member.)

With Douglas Fairbanks, he co-hosted the 1st Academy Awards in 1929, and he solely hosted the 2nd Academy Awards the following year. He served as President of the Academy briefly. DeMille helped found the USC Film School in 1929, and after his East Coast theatrical career failed to revive in the early 1930s, he was active on the faculty there until his death.

=== Death ===
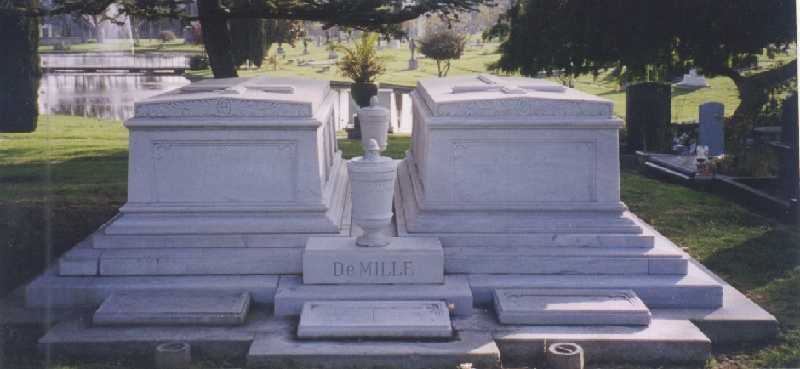
Tombs of Cecil Blount DeMille (right), Constance DeMille (left), William DeMille (urn in front), Clara DeMille (stone below urn in front)

DeMille died on March 5, 1955, in Playa del Rey, California. He is interred in the Hollywood Forever Cemetery.

== Partial filmography ==
- The House of Discord (1913) (author of play)
- The Only Son (1914)
- Rose of the Rancho (1914) (actor)
- Strongheart (1914) (play)
- Young Romance (1915) (author of play)
- The Goose Girl (1915) (screenwriter)
- The Woman (1915) (author of play)
- The Wild Goose Chase (1915) (story/screenwriter)
- Carmen (1915) (screenwriter)
- The Ragamuffin (1916)
- The Blacklist (1916)
- The Sowers (1916)
- The Clown (1916)
- Common Ground (1916)
- Anton the Terrible (1916)
- The Heir to the Hoorah (1916)
- Maria Rosa (1916) (screenwriter)
- Hashimura Togo (1917)
- The Ghost House (1917)
- The Secret Game (1917)
- The Widow's Might (1918)
- One More American (1918)
- The Honor of His House (1918)
- Mirandy Smiles (1918)
- The Mystery Girl (1918)
- For Better, for Worse (1919) (screenwriter)
- Peg o' My Heart (1919) (completed but never released due to legal matters)
- The Tree of Knowledge (1920)
- Jack Straw (1920)
- The Prince Chap (1920)
- Conrad in Quest of His Youth (1920)
- Why Change Your Wife? (1920) (screenwriter)
- Midsummer Madness (1921)
- What Every Woman Knows (1921)
- The Lost Romance (1921)
- After the Show (1921)
- Miss Lulu Bett (1921)
- Bought and Paid For (1922)
- A Trip to Paramountown (1922 short)
- Nice People (1922)
- Clarence (1922)
- The World's Applause (1923)
- Grumpy (1923)
- Only 38 (1923)
- The Marriage Maker (1923)
- Don't Call It Love (1923)
- Icebound (1924)
- The Bedroom Window (1924)
- The Fast Set (1924)
- Classmates (1924) (author of 1907 play)
- Locked Doors (1925)
- Men and Women (1925)
- Lost: A Wife (1925)
- New Brooms (1925)
- The Splendid Crime (1926)
- The Runaway (1926)
- For Alimony Only (1926)
- The Little Adventuress (1927)
- Tenth Avenue (1928)
- Craig's Wife (1928)
- The Doctor's Secret (1929)
- The Idle Rich (1929)
- Passion Flower (1930) (director and producer)
- Two Kinds of Women (1932)
- His Double Life (1933) (associate director)

== Books ==
- deMille, William C. (1939). Hollywood Saga (First ed.). New York, NY: E. P. Dutton. OCLC 1353346.

Non-profit organization positions
Preceded by Douglas Fairbanks	President of the Academy of Motion Picture Arts and Sciences; 1929–1931	Succeeded by M. C. Levee
