= Boarding house =

Type of rental lodging

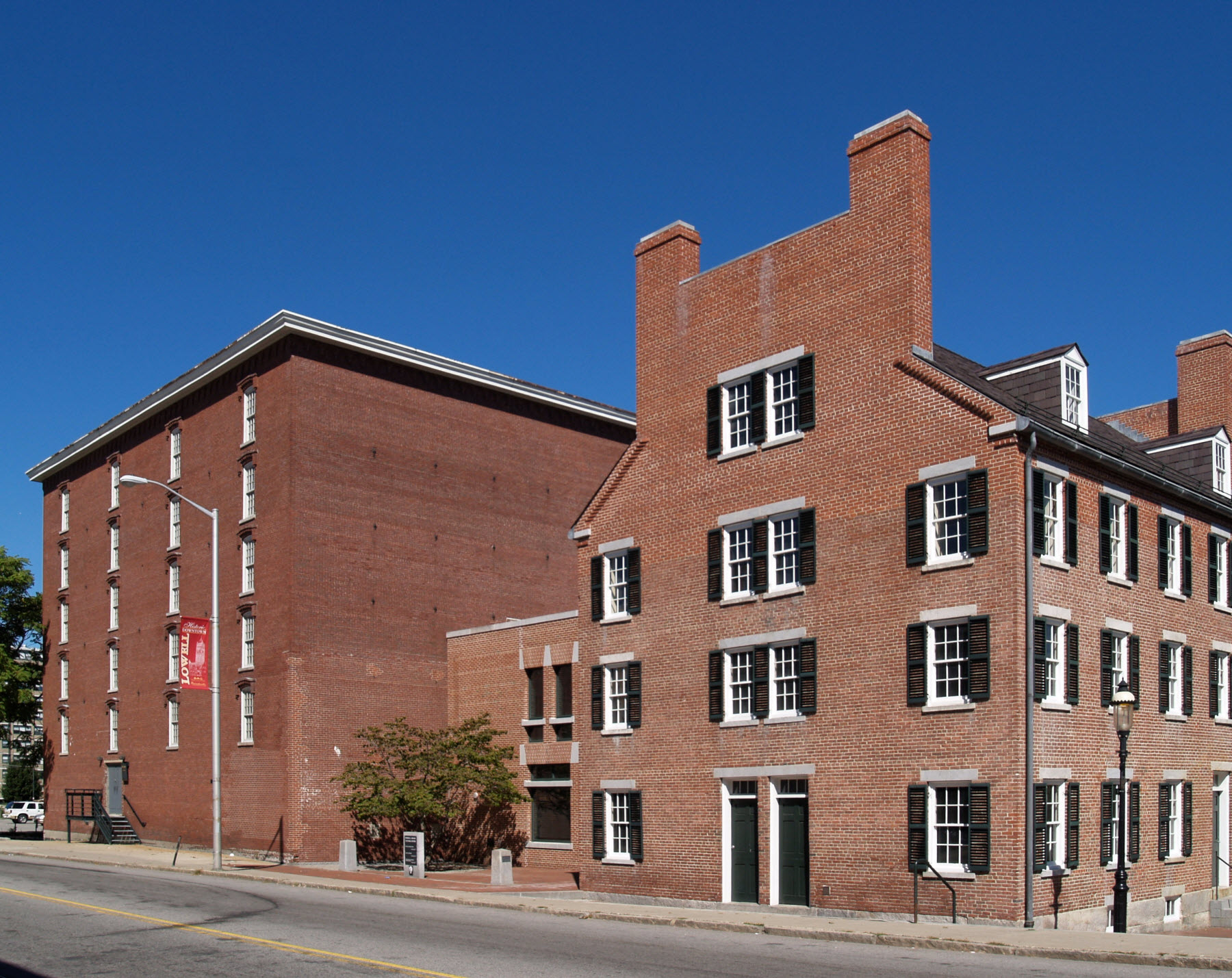
One of the last remaining textile mill boarding houses in Lowell, Massachusetts, on right; part of the Lowell National Historical Park

A boarding house is a house (frequently a family home) in which lodgers rent one or more rooms on a nightly basis and sometimes for extended periods of weeks, months, or years. The common parts of the house are maintained, and some services, such as laundry and cleaning, may be supplied. It normally provides "room and board", with some meals as well as accommodation.

Lodgers legally obtain a licence, not exclusive possession, to use their rooms and so the landlord retains the right of access.

== Arrangements ==
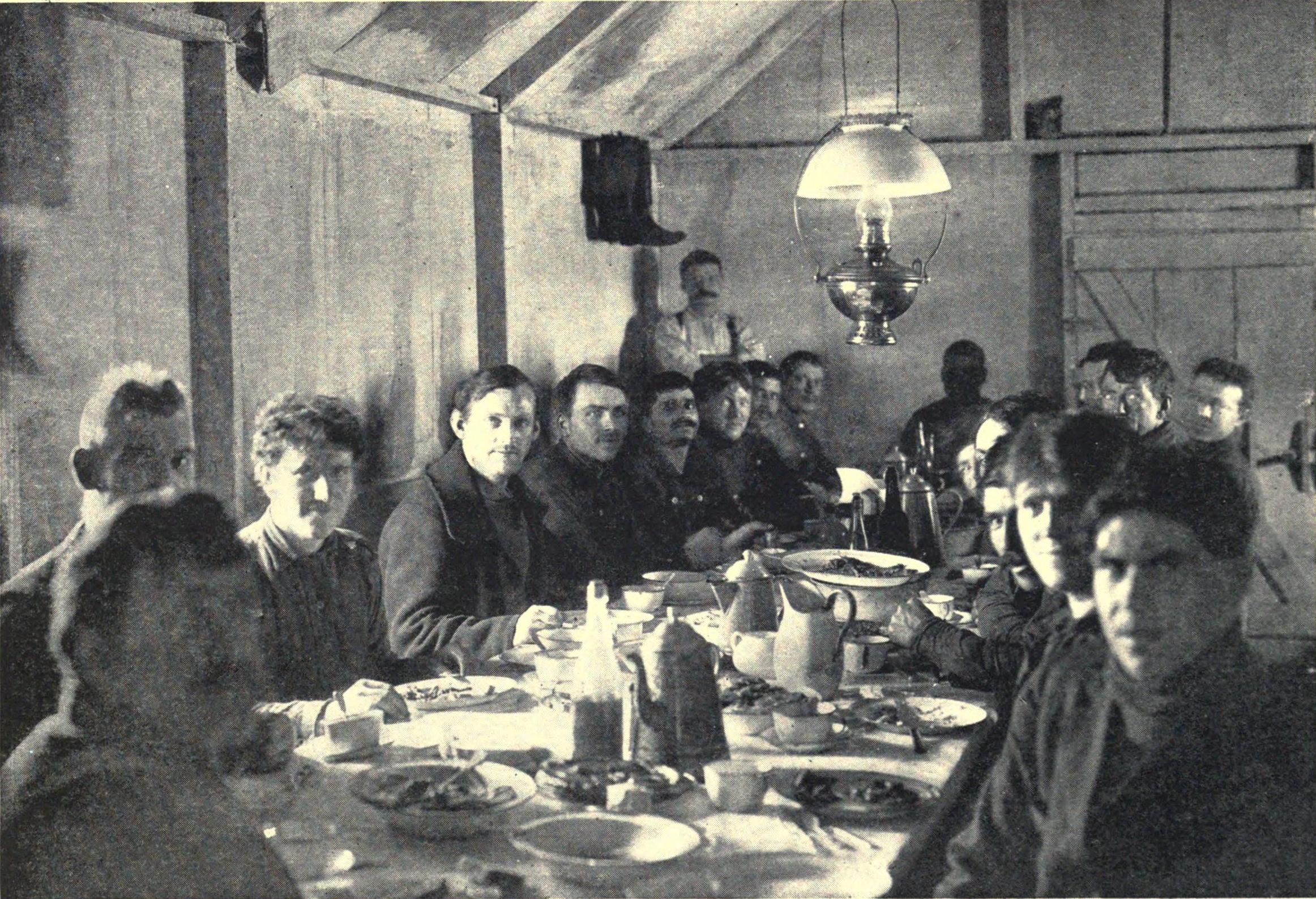
Early-20th-century dinner in a miners' boarding house in northern Canada

Formerly boarders would typically share washing, breakfast, and dining facilities; in recent years, it has become common for each room to have its own washing and toilet facilities. Such boarding houses were often found in seaside towns in the United Kingdom (for tourists) and college towns (for students). It was common for there to be one or two elderly long-term residents. "The phrase "boardinghouse reach" [referring to a diner reaching far across a dining table] comes from an important variant of hotel life. In boardinghouses, tenants rent rooms and the proprietor provides family-style breakfasts and evening dinners in a common dining room. Traditionally, the food was put on the table, and everyone scrambled for the best dishes. Those with a long, fast reach ate best."

Boarders can often arrange to stay bed-and-breakfast (bed and breakfast only), half-board (bed, breakfast and dinner only), or full-board (bed, breakfast, lunch, and dinner). Especially for families on holiday with children, boarding (particularly on a full-board basis) was an inexpensive alternative and much cheaper than staying in all but the cheapest hotels.

== History ==
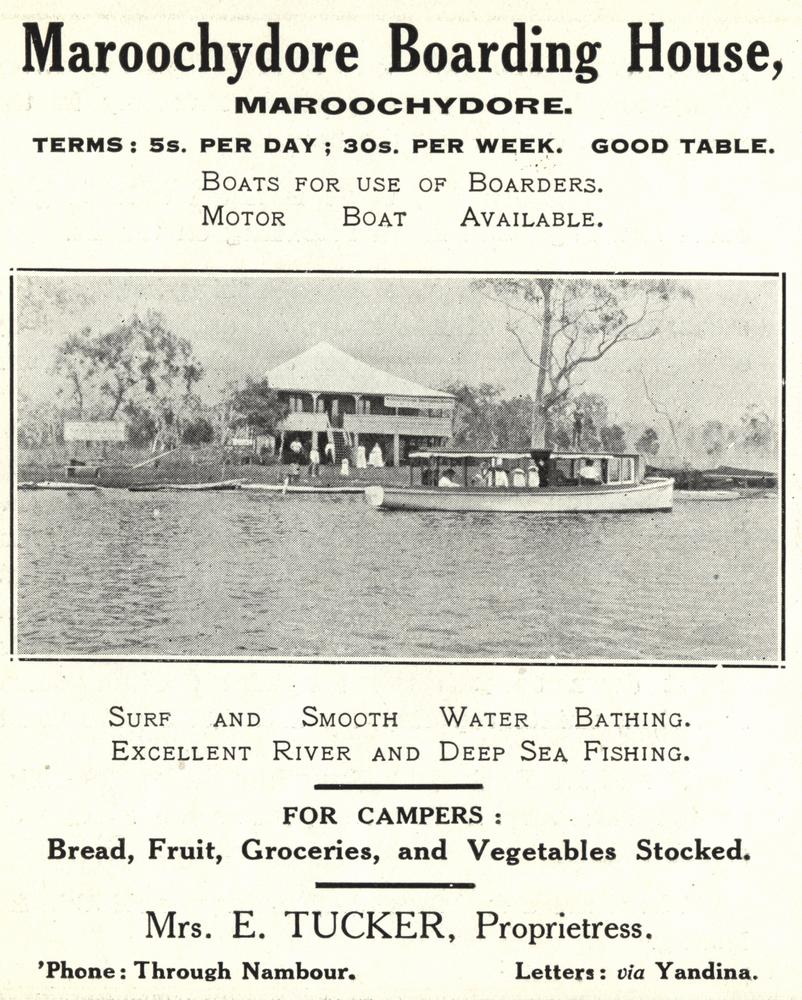
Maroochydore Boarding House, Queensland, circa 1917

Boarding houses were common in most US cities throughout the 19th century and until the 1950s. In Boston, in the 1830s, when landlords and their boarders were added up, between one third and one half of the city's entire population lived in a boarding house. Boarding houses ran from large purpose-built buildings down to "genteel ladies", who rented a room or two as a way of earning a little extra money. Large houses were converted to boarding houses, as wealthy families moved to more fashionable neighborhoods. The boarders in the 19th century ran the gamut as well, from well-off businessmen to poor laborers, and from single people to families. In the 19th century, between a third to half of urban dwellers rented a room to boarders or were boarders themselves. In New York in 1869, the cost of living in a boarding house ranged from $2.50 to $40 a week. (Note: For comparison purposes, a laborer in the construction trades in New York usually earned $1.00 to $1.50 per day around that time.) Some boarding houses attracted people with particular occupations or preferences, such as vegetarian meals.

The boarding house reinforced some social changes: it made it feasible for people to move to a large city and away from their families. The distance from relatives brought social anxieties and complaints that the residents of boarding houses were not respectable. Boarding out gave people the opportunity to meet other residents and so they promoted some social mixing. That had advantages, such as learning new ideas and new people's stories, and also disadvantages, such as occasionally meeting disreputable or dangerous people. Most boarders were men, but women found that they had limited options: a mixed-gender boarding house might mean meeting objectionable men, but an all-female boarding house might be or at least be suspected of being a brothel.

Boarding houses attracted criticism: in 1916, Walter Krumwilde, a Protestant minister, saw the rooming house or boardinghouse system [as] "spreading its web like a spider, stretching out its arms like an octopus to catch the unwary soul." Attempts to reduce boarding house availability had a gendered impact, as boarding houses were typically operated or managed by women "matrons", and closing boarding houses reduced that opportunity for women to make a living from operating such houses.

Later, groups such as the Young Women's Christian Association provided heavily-supervised boarding houses for young women. Boarding houses were viewed as "brick-and-mortar chastity belts" for young unmarried women, which protected them from the vices in the city. The Jeanne d'Arc Residence in Chelsea, Manhattan, which was operated by an order of nuns, aimed to provide a dwelling space for young French seamstresses and nannies. Married women who boarded with their families in boarding houses were accused of being too lazy to do all of the washing, cooking, and cleaning necessary to keep house or to raise children properly. While there is an association between boarding houses and women renters, men also rented, notably the poet-authors Walt Whitman and Edgar Allan Poe.

In the decades after the 1880s, urban reformers began working on modernizing cities; their efforts to create "uniformity within areas, less mixture of social classes, maximum privacy for each family, much lower density for many activities, buildings set back from the street, and a permanently built order" all meant that housing for single people had to be cut back or eliminated. By the early 1930s, urban reformers were typically using codes and zoning to enforce "uniform and protected single-use residential district[s] of private houses", the reformers' preferred housing type. In 1936, the FHA Property Standards defined a dwelling as "any structure used principally for residential purposes" and noted that "commercial rooming houses and tourist homes, sanitariums, tourist cabins, clubs, or fraternities would not be considered dwellings" as they did not have the "private kitchen and a private bath" that reformers viewed as essential in a "proper home." As a result, boarding houses became less common in the early 20th century. Another factor that reduced boarding house numbers was that improved mass transit options made it feasible for more city residents to live in the suburbs and work in the city.

By the 1930s, boarding houses were becoming less common in most of the United States. In the 1930s and 1940s, "rooming or boarding houses had been taken for granted as respectable places for students, single workers, immigrants, and newlyweds to live when they left home or came to the city." However, with the housing boom in the 1950s, middle-class newcomers could increasingly afford their own homes or apartments, which meant that rooming and boarding houses were beginning to be used more often by postsecondary "students, the working poor, or the unemployed." By the 1960s, rooming and boarding houses were deteriorating, as official city policies tended to ignore them.

== Similar concepts ==
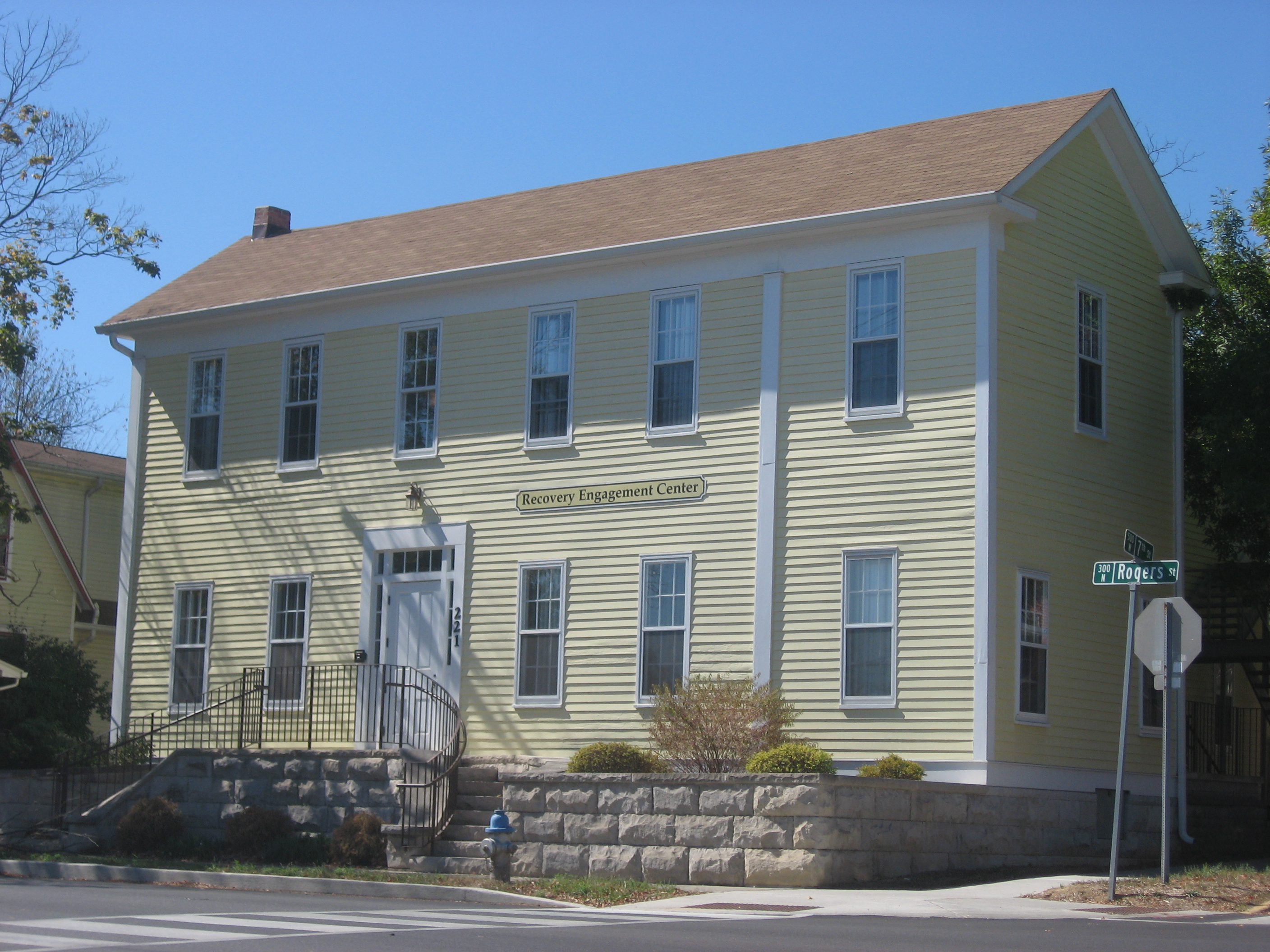
Old Boarding House Recovery Engagement Center, Bloomington, Indiana, US

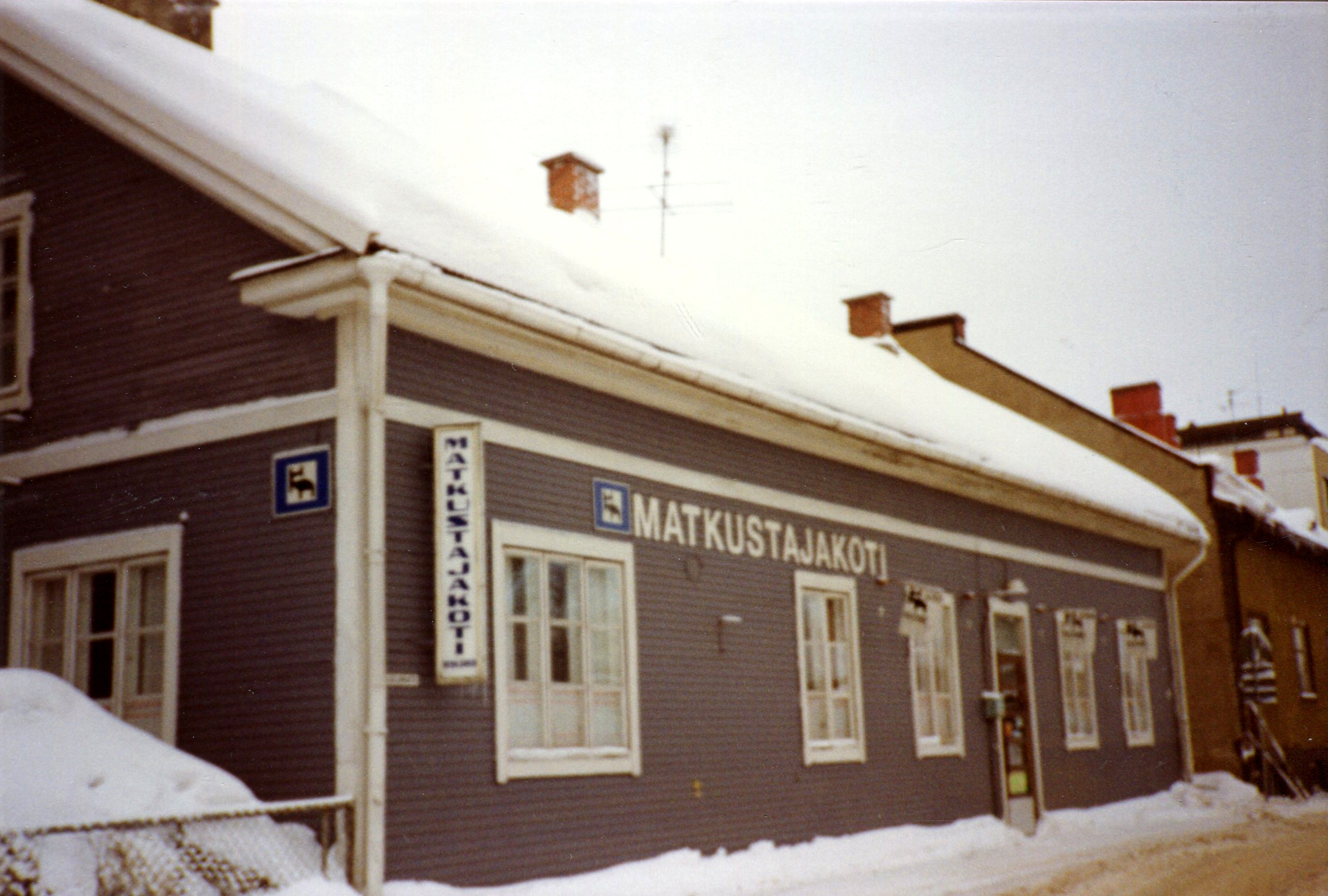
A former boarding house in Kajaani, Finland in 1989

The common lodging-house or flophouse usually offered a space to sleep but little else. When used for temporary purposes, the arrangement was similar to a hostel. Flophouse beds may offer dormitory-style space for as little as one night at a time.

Group homes, residences that provide supervision and assisted living for adults with neurological disabilities or children unable to live with family, share characteristics with boarding houses.

A lodging house, also known in the United States as a rooming house, may or may not offer meals.

Single-room occupancy (SRO) buildings rent individual rooms to residents and have a shared bathroom; some may have a shared kitchen space for residents to cook their own meals.

Dormitory accommodations for postsecondary students are similar to a boarding houses when they include cafeterias.

In the 2010s, microapartments, with one or two rooms rented and access to shared common spaces in the building, are very similar to boarding houses.

Bed and breakfast accommodation (B&B), which exists in many countries in the world (such as the United Kingdom, the United States, Canada, and Australia), is a specialized form of boarding house in which the guests or boarders normally stay only on a bed-and-breakfast basis, and long-term residence is rare.

However, some B&B accommodation is made available on a long-term basis to British local authorities which are legally obliged to house persons and families for whom they have no social housing available. Some such boarding houses allow large groups with low incomes to share overcrowded rooms or otherwise exploit people with problems rendering them vulnerable, such as those with irregular immigration status. Such a boarding-house may well cease to be attractive to short-term lodgers, and the residents may remain in unsatisfactory accommodation for long periods. Much old seaside accommodation is so used since cheap flights have reduced demand for their original seasonal holiday use.

Apart from the worldwide spread of the concept of the B&B, there are equivalents of the British boarding houses elsewhere in the world. For example, in Japan, minshuku are an almost exact equivalent although the normal arrangement would be the equivalent of the English half-board. In Hawaii, where the cost of living is high and incomes barely keep pace, it is common to take in lodgers (who are boarders in English terminology) that share the burden of the overall rent or mortgage payable.

In the Indian subcontinent, boarders are also known as "paying guests". They stay in a home and share a room with domestic facilities. Rates are nominal and monthly charges usually include food, bed, table, and a cupboard. The rent can go higher for a room in an upscale locality with facilities like single occupancy, air conditioning, and high-speed wireless internet access.

== Legal restrictions ==
In the United States, zoning has been used by neighborhoods to limit boarding houses or ban them outright.

== In popular culture ==
=== Literature ===
- In Little Women, Jo March moves to New York City to pursue her literary career and lives in a boarding house where she meets a variety of boarders. She develops a relationship with one of them, Professor Bhaer.
- Sherlock Holmes lived in a boarding house at 221B Baker Street, whose landlady, Mrs. Hudson, provided some domestic service.
- In Look Homeward, Angel, author Thomas Wolfe richly chronicles his life growing up in his mother's boarding house "Dixieland" in early-20th-century Asheville.
- Addy Walker is a character in the American Girl historical collection. Her story takes place in the mid-1860s, and the majority of the books in her series feature her and her family living in a boarding house in Philadelphia. Similarly, the character Claudie Wells lives in a boarding house in Harlem in 1922, and the Great Depression-era character Kit Kittredge's family turns their home into a boarding house as a source of extra income.
- Mary Roberts Rinehart wrote the now-classic boarding-house mystery, The Case of Jennie Brice, in 1913.
- H. G. Wells satirized boarding houses of the Edwardian era in his novel The Dream (1924).
- E. Phillips Oppenheim set his espionage novel The Strange Boarders of Palace Crescent (1934) in a London boarding house.
- The climax of Patrick Hamilton's 1941 novel Hangover Square occurs in a dingy Maidenhead boarding house.
- Lynne Reid Banks's 1960 novel The L-Shaped Room is set in a run-down boarding house.
- Ben Mears, the main character in the 1975 horror novel Salem's Lot by Stephen King, stays at Eva Miller's boarding house.
- In True Grit, the main protagonist, Mattie Ross, stays at the Monarch Boarding House where she is forced to share a bed with Grandma Turner, one of the long-term residents and where a robust communal meal takes place.
- The young heroes in Horatio Alger's 19th-century rags-to-riches tales often experience life in boarding houses and single works often depict both unscrupulous and kindly boarding house proprietors as the characters make their way upward (or downward) in the world.
- In Terry Pratchett's Discworld novel The Truth, the protagonist, William de Worde, lives in Mrs Arcanum's Lodging House for Respectable Working Men (2000).

=== Films ===
- The 1914 film, The Star Boarder, has a boarding house as its setting.
- The 1922 film, The Light in the Dark, has a boarding house as its setting.
- The 1927 film, The Lodger, has a boarding house as its setting.
- The 1931 film, Dr. Jekyll and Mr. Hyde, shows a boarding house.
- In the 1933 film, Son of Kong, Carl Denham (Robert Armstrong) stays in a boarding house.
- In the 1936 film, A Pain in the Pullman, the Three Stooges stay in a boarding house.
- In the 1937 film, Stage Door, has a boarding house for its setting.
- In the 1939 film, The Story of Alexander Graham Bell, Alexander Graham Bell (Don Ameche) stays in a boarding house.
- In the 1941 film, Citizen Kane, Kane's parents own a boarding house.
- In the 1942 film, Yankee Doodle Dandy, George M. Cohan (James Cagney) stays in a boarding house.
- In the 1942 film, The Magnificent Ambersons, the original ending took place in a boarding house.
- The 1945 film, The Woman in Green, shows a boarding house.
- In the 1946 film, It's a Wonderful Life, Mrs. Bailey owns a boarding house in the alternate universe known as Pottersville.
- The 1950 film, Riding High, briefly shows a boarding house.
- In the 1950 film, Mystery Street, Mrs. Smerrling (Elsa Lanchester) owns a boarding house.
- Much of the plot in the 1951 film The Day the Earth Stood Still, takes place in a Washington, DC boarding house.
- In the 1952 film, The Story of Will Rogers, Will Rogers (Will Rogers Jr.) stays in a boarding house.
- In the 1957 film, The Buster Keaton Story, The Keatons stay in a boarding house.
- In the 1966 film, The Ghost and Mr. Chicken, the main character and aspiring reporter, Luther Heggs (Don Knotts), lives in a boarding house.
- In The Shootist (1976), J. B. Books (John Wayne) rents a room at a Carson City, Nevada boarding house. Dying of cancer, Books wishes to end his days in peace and quiet. But old enemies with scores to settle converge.
- In the 1982 film Liar's Moon, Jack Duncan and Ginny Peterson run away from their parents in Texas to marry each other and stay in a boarding house in Louisiana.
- The film Tales from the Crypt: Demon Knight, takes place in a boarding house. It was once a church until it was turned into a boarding house. Brayker and the residents battle the demons in this boarding house.
- Sandy Brooks and Nick Snowden the main characters in Snow lived in a boarding house.
- In Brooklyn, the main protagonist, Eilis Lacey, stays at a boarding house.
- In the 2011 animated Film From Up On Poppy Hill, the main character whose name is Umi, lives and helps her grandmother run a boarding house throughout the movie while her mother is abroad studying medicine in the USA.

=== Television ===
- Several episodes of Alfred Hitchcock Presents feature and take place in boarding houses, such as "The Landlady" and "The Dusty Drawer".
- A pair of puppet shows released on home video feature an older woman called Bubbie who runs a boarding house. Bubbie hosts her grandchildren and their friend for Hanukkah and Passover celebrations with her boarders; she takes a little time to explain to the young man delivering the Hanukkah groceries how a boarding house works.
- Mr Bean lives in a boarding house in the early episodes.
- In the cartoon Groovie Goolies, the characters of that show reside at a boarding house called Horrible Hall that is located on Horrible Drive.
- In the 1981 CBS made-for-television horror film, Dark Night of the Scarecrow, the town's postman, Otis P. Hazelrigg, lives in Mrs. Bunch's boarding house.
- The titular protagonist of the Nickelodeon television show Hey Arnold! lives in a boarding house (called "Sunset Arms") that's owned and operated by his paternal grandparents, Phillip "Phil" and Gertrude "Gertie" Shortman.
- In The Vampire Diaries, Stefan and Damon Salvatore live in the old Salvatore Boarding house when they return to Mystic Falls.
- In The Andy Griffith Show, Barney Fife is a long-term resident of a boarding house run by Mrs. Mendelbright. When she catches Barney cooking in his room with a hot plate, she asks him to leave.
- The South Korean television series Reply 1994 is set in a nineties boarding house.
- In the Torchwood episode "Immortal Sins", Jack Harkness, and his companion Angelo Colasanto stay in a boarding house.
- The Canadian historical drama Murdoch Mysteries, set in Toronto at the turn of the 20th century, features boarding houses in several episodes.

=== Podcasts ===
- Unwell: A Midwestern Gothic Mystery features a struggling boarding house run by Dot Harper.

=== Comics ===
- Many of the scenes in the comic strip Bloom County took place at the Bloom Boarding House (based on the real-life Linsay House) owned by the family of main character Milo Bloom.
- Our Boarding House (1921–1984) was an American single-panel cartoon and comic strip set in a boarding house run by the sensible Mrs. Hoople.

=== Board games ===
- In Fantasy Flight Games' board game Arkham Horror, numerous encounters occur at Ma's Boarding house.

== See also ==
- Boarding school
- List of human habitation forms
- Room and board
- Hostel
- House in multiple occupation
- Rooming house
- Tenement
- Single room occupancy
