= The Butler Did It =

The Butler Did It is a phrase regarded as a cliche in detective fiction, and may refer to:

- "The butler did it", a phrase associated with the 1930 novel The Door by Mary Roberts Rinehart
- "The Butler Did It", a 1973 single by Skogie
- "The Butler Did It (A Bird in the Hand)", an episode of Police Squad!
- "The Butler Did It" (Arthur), a season 20 episode of Arthur
- "The Butler Did It" (Dynasty), a 2018 episode of Dynasty
- "The Butler Did It" (The Batman), a season 2 episode of The Batman
- "The Butler Did It", a 1965 episode of Petticoat Junction
- Something Fishy, a 1957 novel by P. G. Wodehouse
