= The Bat Whispers =

1930 film directed by Roland West

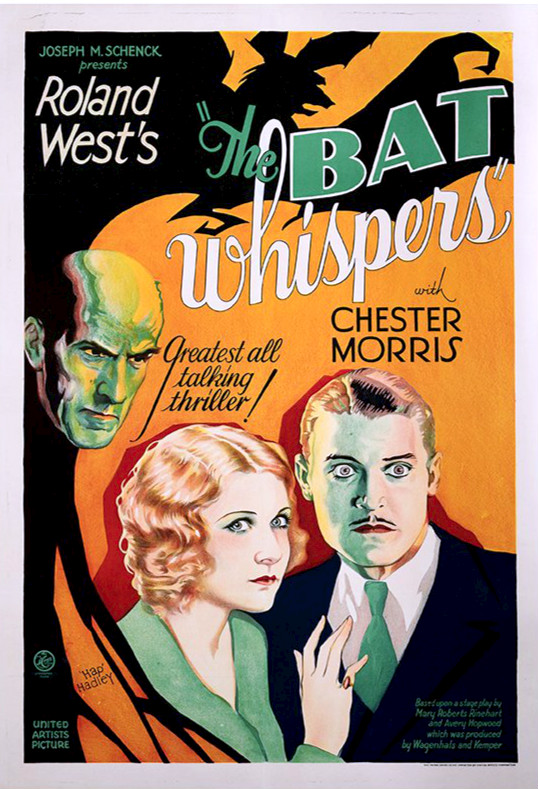
- Theatrical release poster
- Directed by: Roland West
- Screenplay by: Roland West
- Based on: The Bat, a 1920 play by Mary Roberts Rinehart and Avery Hopwood
- Produced by: Joseph M. Schenck
- Starring: Chester Morris; Una Merkel
- Cinematography: Ray June (35mm); Robert H. Planck (65mm)
- Edited by: Hal C. Kern; James Smith
- Music by: Hugo Riesenfeld
- Production company: Joseph M. Schenck Productions for Art Cinema Corporation
- Distributed by: United Artists
- Release date: November 13, 1930
- Running time: 83 minutes
- Country: United States
- Language: English

The Bat Whispers is a 1930 American pre-Code mystery film directed by Roland West, produced by Joseph M. Schenck, and released by United Artists. The film is based on the 1920 mystery play The Bat, written by Mary Roberts Rinehart and Avery Hopwood, and is the second film version by the same director, previously adapted in 1926. An early talkie and one of the first widescreen films, West financed the cinematography, which required two cameramen and several techniques. It was considered a lost film for many years, but was restored from duplicate filmstock in 1988. As a work published in 1930, it entered the public domain in the United States on January 1, 2026.

== Plot ==
The fullscreen (left) and widescreen (right) versions of The Bat Whispers

A mysterious criminal by the name of "The Bat" eludes police and then finally announces his retirement to the country.

In the countryside near the town of Oakdale, news of a bank robbery in Oakdale has put Mrs. Van Gordner's maid, Lizzie, on edge. Van Gordner is leasing the house from Mr. Fleming, the Oakdale bank president, who is in Europe. The chief suspect in the bank robbery, a cashier, has disappeared. Van Gordner's niece, Dale arrives followed by the gardener she has hired. Dr. Venrees arrives and tells Van Gordner that he has received a telegram from Fleming stating that because of the robbery he will be returning soon and will need to occupy his house.

There are mysterious noises in the house and lights turning on and off. A rock is thrown through the window with a note threatening harm if the occupants don't leave. Dale, and the gardener, who is actually Brook, the missing teller, are looking for a secret room in the house. They believe the money from the robbery is hidden there.

Detective Anderson shows up and questions Van Gordner. Fleming's nephew, Richard, arrives at Dale's request. She is hoping he can help in finding the secret room. Richard finds the house plans but refuses to show them to Dale. He pushes her away and runs up the stairs, but he is shot by someone at the top of the stairs and falls dead. Van Gordner sends for a private detective.

A mysterious masked man sticks a gun in the caretaker's back and tells him he had better get everyone out of the house. The lights continue to go on and off. The shadow of the Bat is seen by various occupants of the house.

Anderson states that Fleming isn't in Europe but robbed his own bank. He accuses the doctor of being part of the plot.

An unconscious man is found in the garage. He comes to and is questioned by Anderson. He can't remember anything. Anderson tells the private detective to keep an eye on him.

The hidden room and the missing money are found. Fleming, the missing banker, is found dead behind a wall in the room. The garage suddenly bursts into flames. In the ensuing chaos, the Bat appears and is caught, but he gets away before he can be unmasked.

As the Bat is fleeing from the house, he is caught in a bear trap, set up by Lizzie. He is revealed to be Anderson, who isn't actually Anderson. The real Anderson is the man who was found unconscious. The Bat says that no jail can hold him and he will escape.

A curtain closes across the screen. We are in a theater. Chester Morris, who played Anderson tells the audience that as long as they don't reveal the Bat's identity, they will be safe from the Bat.

== Cast ==
As credited in order of appearance:

- Chance Ward as Police Lieutenant
- Richard Tucker as Mr Bell
- Wilson Benge as The Butler
- DeWitt Jennings as Police Captain
- Sidney D'Albrook as Police Sergeant
- S.E. Jennings as The Man in Black Mask
- Grayce Hampton as Cornelia Van Gorder
- Maude Eburne as Lizzie Allen
- Spencer Charters as The Caretaker
- Una Merkel as Dale Van Gorder
- William Bakewell as Brook
- Gustav von Seyffertitz as Dr Venrees
- Chester Morris as Detective Anderson
- Hugh Huntley as Richard Fleming
- Charles Dow Clark as Detective Jones
- Ben Bard as The Unknown

== Film techniques ==
Director West financed the Magnafilm widescreen process and employed two cinematographers, using techniques not to be seen until the 1950s and Otto Preminger. Along with The Big Trail (1930) it's one of the first known uses of widescreen. Cameras used two different sized film stock and filmed in a variety of techniques including panning, cut scenes, and close ups. Panning can be seen throughout the film but most notably in the opening scene of the movie.

The movie begins with a shot of the face of a clock tower. It then pulls back and slowly scans or "pans" all the way down the building to show a car pulling out of a police station. Cut scenes can be seen throughout the film to show lapses in time. For example, when the police car is driving down the street, the scene (shot from the back of the car over the driver's shoulder) can be seen fading into another scene to convey a sense of time passing.

In 1930, movie cameras were not portable enough to be used in the back of cars, but Charles Cline invented a camera used for filming The Bat Whispers, more often used in Ray June's cinematography, for fluidity and to show The Bat in flight. It was "a lightweight 24-foot-long camera dolly that could send a camera zooming 18 feet in a fraction of a second". Close-up shots were also incorporated—the camera "zooms in" on the actors' faces when the characters are frightened and trying to figure out where the mysterious noises are coming from, and when The Bat is creeping up to Dale Van Gorder in the secret room.

== Production background ==
An early talkie, this film is the second film version of the 1920 hit Broadway play The Bat, written by Mary Roberts Rinehart and Avery Hopwood, based on Roberts 1908 book The Circular Staircase. The first film version of the play, The Bat (1926), was also directed by Roland West. Just as in the play and the first film, people explore an old mansion looking for a hidden treasure while a caped killer picks them off one by one.

The film was shot in three versions: a pair of 1.33:1 aspect ratio, 35mm negatives for US and foreign prints; and a 2:1 aspect ratio 65mm widescreen "Magnifilm" version (misspelled "Magnafilm" in some ads). The domestic negative was cut down to 72 minutes for the 1938 Atlantic Pictures reissue, and subsequently was lost.

In 1988 the UCLA Film and Television Archive restored and preserved the 35mm foreign version and the 65mm Magnifilm from the original camera negatives. UCLA gained access through the Library of Congress upon Mary Pickford's death in 1979 when she willed them her film collection, The Bat Whispers (65mm) was among it.

This film was remade again in 1959 as The Bat with Agnes Moorehead and Vincent Price.

== Influence ==
Comic-book creator Bob Kane said in his 1989 autobiography Batman and Me that the villain of The Bat Whispers was an inspiration for his character Batman.

== See also ==
- List of rediscovered films
- List of early wide-gauge films
