= The Bat (1959 film) =

1959 film

- theatrical film poster
- Directed by: Crane Wilbur
- Written by: Crane Wilbur (screen story and screenplay)
- Based on: The Circular Staircase (1908 novel by Mary Roberts Rinehart); The Bat (a 1920 play by Mary Roberts Rinehart and Avery Hopwood)
- Produced by: C.J. Tevlin
- Starring: Vincent Price; Agnes Moorehead; Darla Hood
- Cinematography: Joseph F. Biroc
- Edited by: William Austin
- Music by: Louis Forbes
- Production company: Liberty Pictures
- Distributed by: Allied Artists
- Release date: December 17, 1959 (US)
- Running time: 80 minutes
- Country: United States
- Language: English

The Bat is a 1959 American crime-mystery thriller starring Vincent Price and Agnes Moorehead. It is the fourth film adaptation of the story, which began as a 1908 novel, The Circular Staircase, by Mary Roberts Rinehart, which she later adapted (with Avery Hopwood) into the 1920 play The Bat. The first film version of the play was the 1926 American silent film The Bat.

The 1959 film version was adapted by playwright Crane Wilbur, who also directed it. The Bat wound up in December 1959 on a double bill with the British Hammer film The Mummy. Now in the public domain, The Bat is available for online download.

== Plot ==
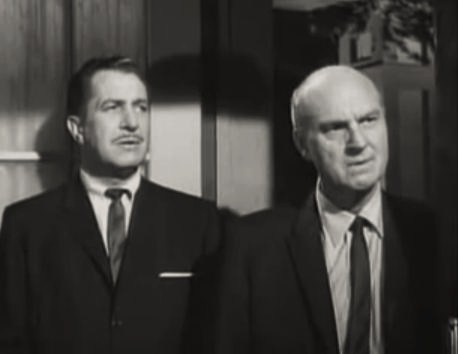
Vincent Price and Gavin Gordon in The Bat

Mystery author Cornelia Van Gorder rents The Oaks, a summer home in a small town, from local bank president John Fleming. While on a hunting trip with his physician, Dr. Malcolm Wells, Fleming confesses to stealing over $1 million in negotiable securities from the bank. He offers to split the money with Wells in return for help faking his own death and threatens to kill him if he does not comply. Wells shoots Fleming and covers up the murder.

Meanwhile, the town is being terrorized by a mysterious murderer known as "the Bat", said to be a man with no face who murders women at night by ripping out their throats with steel claws. Van Gorder's assistant Lizzie tells her all the servants, except the chauffeur, have quit in fear. As they lock up The Oaks that night, Lizzie sees the Bat's clawed hand reaching through an unlocked window. Van Gorder calls the police, who promise to send officers to investigate. The Bat breaks into the house and releases a bat, which bites Lizzie. Lizzie fears she may have contracted rabies. Van Gorder calls for Wells to treat the bite.

Wells is in his laboratory, doing experiments on bats. The local chief of detectives, Lieutenant Andy Anderson, is watching through a window. When Wells leaves to answer Van Gorder's call, Anderson breaks into the laboratory and searches it. Wells checks Lizzie's wound and catches the bat that bit her. Anderson arrives shortly after and says an officer will watch the house for the rest of the night.

Van Gorder is visited by Wells, Dale Bailey, and Judy Hollander. Dale's husband, Victor Bailey, is a clerk at the bank and the prime suspect in the theft of the securities, having been framed by Fleming; Judy works at the bank and is a witness in his defense. While Anderson is visiting Mark Fleming, the nephew and heir of John Fleming, Van Gorder has Dale call him about blueprints that may show a hiding place in The Oaks. Dale promises to help her look for them that evening. Meanwhile, Van Gorder has hired new servants and promoted Warner the chauffeur to butler.

The Bat (1959) by Crane Wilbur

While Van Gorder, Judy, and Dale are having dinner, Mark sneaks into the house to look for the blueprints on his own. The Bat kills him and takes the blueprints. Anderson and Wells (who is also the local coroner) arrive to investigate the murder. Anderson questions the women and Van Gorder's new butler, Warner. Anderson tells the women to lock themselves into their rooms for the rest of the night; he will stay to watch for the Bat.

After the women go to bed, Anderson goes into the woods behind the house with a flashlight; Warner follows him. Soon after, the Bat enters the house again. He cuts the phone line and goes to the third floor, where he begins chiseling a hole into one of the walls. Hearing the noise from his chiseling, Dale and Judy go to investigate. The Bat kills Judy and flees the house. Anderson returns, saying he saw a man in the woods. He accuses Warner, whom he recognizes as a suspect for a robbery in Chicago; Warner replies he was acquitted. Wells comes to the house, saying he had an accident in his car nearby; Anderson casts suspicion on the doctor as well.

Van Gorder investigates the room the Bat was in and realizes there is a secret room behind the wall where he was chiseling. She accidentally traps herself in the room, but is freed by Detective Davenport, the officer assigned to watch the house that evening. Meanwhile, the Bat comes to kill Wells in his laboratory. Wells pulls a gun and taunts the Bat, whose identity Wells seems to know. Wells tells the Bat that he knows where the money is and that, after the Bat is dead, he (Wells) will collect it. Wells then attempts to shoot the Bat but the other attacks. The two men struggle and Wells is killed. The Bat leaves a fake suicide note to frame Wells as the Bat.

The Bat returns to Van Gorder's house, where he sets the garage on fire to draw the occupants outside. Mystery writer Van Gorder sees through this ruse, however. She has Dale, Lizzie, and Davenport hide and wait for the Bat. When confronted, the Bat, wearing the mask which obscures the outlines of his face (hence his description as "a man with no face") shoots Davenport, though it is unclear how badly, and is about to kill the three women when Warner returns and shoots him dead. Warner unmasks the Bat, who is revealed to be Lieutenant Anderson, whose motives were financial, as he was one of the first people notified of the theft of the bank securities later converted into cash.

== Cast ==
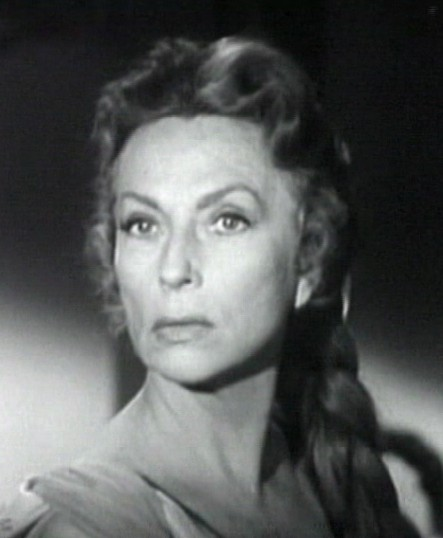
Agnes Moorehead as Cornelia Van Gorder

- Vincent Price as Dr. Malcolm Wells
- Agnes Moorehead as Cornelia van Gorder
- Gavin Gordon as Lt. Andy Anderson
- John Sutton as Warner
- Lenita Lane as Lizzie Allen
- Elaine Edwards as Dale Bailey
- Darla Hood as Judy Hollander
- John Bryant as Mark Fleming
- Harvey Stephens as John Fleming
- Mike Steele as Victor Bailey
- Riza Royce as Jane Patterson
- Robert B. Williams as Detective Davenport

Cast notes

- The Bat was the final film appearance for Darla Hood, who between 1935 and 1941 played "Darla" in Our Gang comedy shorts.

== Production ==
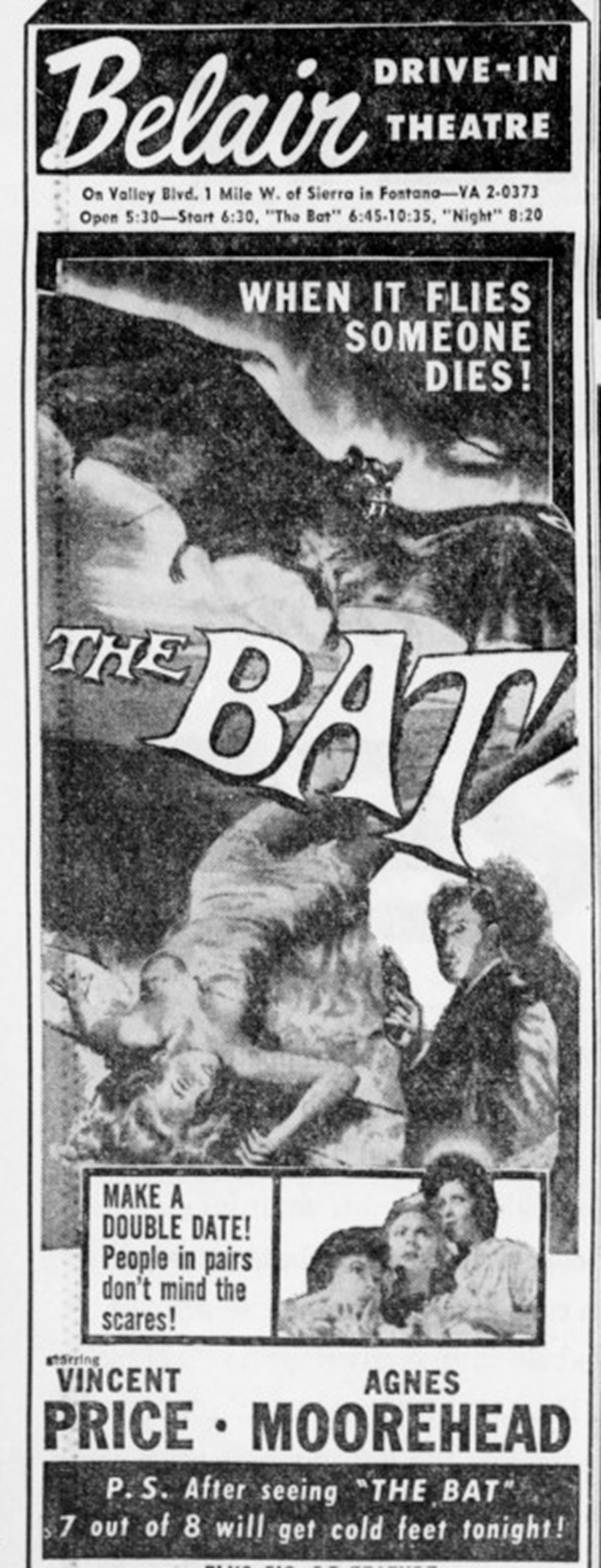
Drive-in advertisement from 1959

RKO Pictures bought the rights to remake The Bat from Mary Pickford, who produced the original 1926 film adaptation for United Artists, the studio she founded in 1919 with Douglas Fairbanks, Charles Chaplin and D. W. Griffith. RKO stopped making movies. Film rights ultimately went into the hands of C.J. Tevlin, former head of RKO, who planned to make the film as an independent producer.

In April 1959 Trevlin signed a deal with Allied Artists to make the film. Part of the budget came from American Broadcasting-Paramount Theatre.

The film was written and directed by Crane Wilbur who had written the script for the popular 1953 film House of Wax starring Vincent Price. Filming started April 27, 1959.

== Release ==
The Bat wound up in December 1959 on a double feature with the Hammer horror film The Mummy.

== Reception ==
According to Turner Classic Movies, in an era of films featuring "rampaging aliens and sinister ghouls", The Bat's period piece approach was not a crowd pleaser, although its reputation has improved over time.

In a contemporary review of the film, The New York Times praised Moorehead's "good, snappy performance" and Crane Wilbur's direction. Variety called it "sluggish".

Film critic Leonard Maltin awarded the film 2 1/2 out of 4 stars (a rating that he used more than any other rating), calling it "[a] faithful filming of Mary Roberts Rinehart-Avery Hopwood play".

Allmovie gave the film a mixed review, complimenting the film's screenplay, but criticized the script's mechanical nature and lack of scariness, as well as the varying quality of performances from the cast. But they also stated, "While it's all done in a by-the-numbers manner, there's more than enough here to entertain whodunit fans".

== See also ==
- List of American films of 1959
- List of films featuring home invasions
- List of films in the public domain in the United States
