= Seven Days (play) =

Play by Avery Hopwood and Mary Roberts Rinehart

- Original language: English
- Written by: Avery Hopwood; Mary Roberts Rinehart
- Based on: Seven Days by Mary Roberts Rinehart
- Genre: Farce

Premiere
- Date: November 10, 1909
- Place: Astor Theatre

Seven Days is a three-act play written in 1909 by Avery Hopwood and Mary Roberts Rinehart. It is a farce based on Rinehart's 1908 novella of the same name, which had been expanded into a bestselling 1909 novel titled When a Man Marries. Producers Lincoln Wagenhals and Collin Kemper asked Rinehart to adapt the novella for the stage. Since she had not written a play before, she agreed to work with Avery Hopwood, a young playwright with just one produced play, to create the script. Wagenhals and Kemper staged the play at the Astor Theatre on Broadway, where it premiered on November 10, 1909. The production was a hit that played for 397 performances. The play's success led Hopwood to a highly successful career as an author of comedies and enabled Wagenhals and Kemper to retire.

Rinehart and Hopwood would later collaborate on two other hit plays, Spanish Love and The Bat, both also produced by Wagenhals and Kemper, who came out of retirement.

In 1925 the play was adapted into a silent film of the same name starring Lillian Rich and Creighton Hale.
