= The Bat (play) =

1920 mystery play

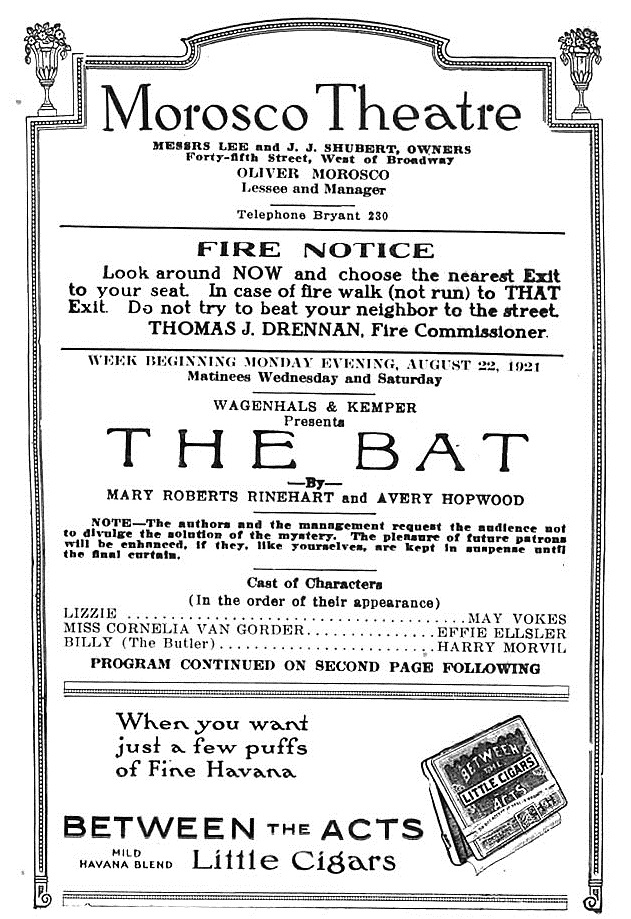
- Playbill of the Broadway production
- Original language: English
- Written by: Mary Roberts Rinehart; Avery Hopwood
- Based on: The Circular Staircase by Mary Roberts Rinehart
- Genre: Mystery, comedy
- Setting: A country house

Premiere
- Date: August 23, 1920
- Place: Morosco Theatre

The Bat is a three-act play by Mary Roberts Rinehart and Avery Hopwood that was first produced by Lincoln Wagenhals and Collin Kemper in 1920. The story combines elements of mystery and comedy as Cornelia Van Gorder and guests spend a stormy night at her rented summer home, searching for stolen money they believe is hidden in the house, while they are stalked by a masked criminal known as "the Bat". The Bat's identity is revealed at the end of the final act.

The play originated as an adaptation of Rinehart's 1908 mystery novel The Circular Staircase. Rinehart and Hopwood altered the story to prepare it for Broadway, including adding the titular antagonist. The connection to the novel led to a legal dispute over film rights with the Selig Polyscope Company, producers of a 1915 film adaptation of the novel, also titled The Circular Staircase. After previewing under the title A Thief in the Night, the play opened as The Bat at the Morosco Theatre on Broadway on August 23, 1920.

The Bat was a critical and commercial success. It ran for 867 performances in New York and 327 performances in London; several road companies took the show to other areas. The play was revived twice on Broadway, in 1937 and 1953. It had several adaptations, including a 1926 novelization credited to Rinehart and Hopwood but ghostwritten by Stephen Vincent Benét. Three film adaptations were produced: The Bat (1926), The Bat Whispers (1930), and The Bat (1959). The play and its adaptations inspired other comedy-mysteries with similar settings, and influenced the creation of the comic-book superhero Batman.

== Plot ==
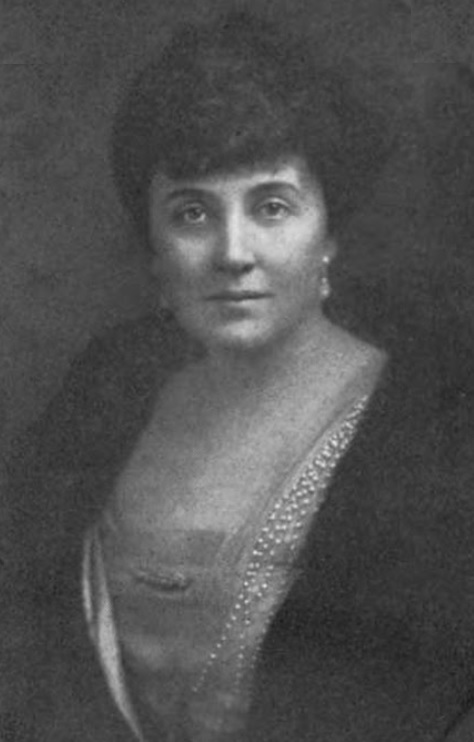
Mary Roberts Rinehart based the play on her novel, The Circular Staircase.

Elderly, single Cornelia Van Gorder is renting an old, isolated Long Island mansion owned by the estate of Courtleigh Fleming, a bank president who had reportedly died several months before. On a stormy evening, the electricity flickers on and off. Most of the servants, convinced that the house is haunted, have made excuses and fled. According to a news report, a mysterious criminal known as "the Bat" has eluded police in the area. Cornelia is in the house with her maid, Lizzie, and Billy, a Japanese butler who is part of Fleming's household staff. (Note: Plot details are primarily based on the 1932 version, reprinted in 1944. In a 1945 revision of the script, Rinehart replaced Billy with a "Negro butler" named Washington.) They are joined by Brooks, a gardener recently hired by Cornelia's niece, Dale Ogden. Dale and Dr. Wells, the local coroner and an old friend of Fleming's, arrive for a visit. They tell Cornelia that Jack Bailey, a cashier at Fleming's bank, has disappeared and is suspected of stealing over a million dollars. Cornelia tells Lizzie and Dale that she has invited a police detective to visit because someone has been trying to break into the house at night. Wells leaves, and Detective Anderson arrives. Cornelia tells Anderson that she suspects Fleming embezzled from the bank and hid the money in the house. While Cornelia shows Anderson to his room, Dale warns Brooks (who is actually Jack Bailey, and Dale's fiancé) that Anderson is a detective. Brooks also believes that Fleming hid the money, and wants to clear himself by finding it. Dale summons Fleming's nephew, Richard (who rented the house to Cornelia), to learn about possible hiding places. Richard shows her a blueprint of the house, with a hidden room where the money might be. While they fight over the blueprint, a figure appears in the darkness and shoots Richard, ending the first act.

Cornelia calls Dr. Wells back to the house to examine Richard's body. Dale asks Wells to hide the blueprint she took from Richard because the others might think that she killed him for it. Reginald Beresford, a lawyer waiting in his car after he drove Richard to the house, comes inside. Reginald recognizes Jack, and the exposure of her fiancé makes Dale admit that she gave Wells the blueprint with the hidden room. Wells claims that he does not have the blueprint; Cornelia reveals other evidence incriminating him, and Anderson asks to question him alone. Wells knocks Anderson unconscious during the interrogation and drags him into another room. Before Wells can go to the hidden room, a stranger claiming to have lost his memory after he was attacked and tied up in the garage appears at the terrace door. When the guests try to identify the unknown man, they discover that they have been locked in the house. At the end of the second act, Cornelia finds the Bat's calling card, a black paper bat, tacked to a door.

The third act begins on the upper floor of the house, where a masked man is seen in the previously-hidden room taking a money bag from a safe. When Dale finds the room, the man flees, leaving her and the money locked inside. The others find her there, unconscious. Anderson reappears and accuses Wells of stealing the money and killing Richard. Cornelia begins to present an alternative theory, but is interrupted when the unknown man comes upstairs and Anderson asks him about his amnesia. Cornelia says that she sees a man on the roof, and most of the group leaves to look for him. Cornelia uses the distraction to tell Dale, Jack and the unknown man that she thinks the money is still in the room. When they search for the money, Jack finds the body of Courtleigh Fleming, who was killed only recently. As Cornelia, Dale and Jack argue about what has happened, the unknown man locks the door and orders them to be quiet. When the masked man sneaks in through a window, the unknown man apprehends him and reveals that he, the unknown man, is the real Detective Anderson; the Bat (the masked man) had pretended to be Anderson.

== History ==
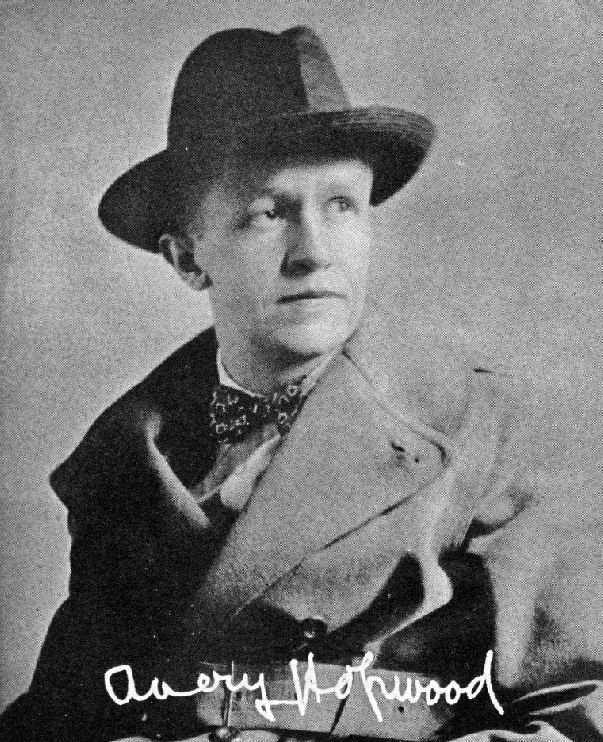
Avery Hopwood helped Rinehart complete the play.

Mary Roberts Rinehart was one of the most successful American mystery writers of the early 20th century. After starting her writing career with short stories, she achieved popular success with the publication of her 1908 novel The Circular Staircase. In 1909 Broadway producers Lincoln Wagenhals and Collin Kemper asked Rinehart to adapt her novella Seven Days for the stage. She agreed to work with Avery Hopwood, a young playwright with just one produced play, to create the script. The play Seven Days debuted on Broadway in November 1909 and became a hit. Rinehart and Hopwood each continued to write plays, but did not collaborate again until The Bat.

In 1916, Rinehart asked theatrical producer Edgar Selwyn whether he thought a mystery play would be successful if it kept the mystery unresolved until the end; Selwyn replied that such a play could make a million dollars. Rinehart decided to base this play on The Circular Staircase, which had been adapted for film in 1915. Although she began work on the play in spring 1917, she was distracted by work for the United States Department of War during World War I and by fall 1918 had only written the first two acts. Rinehart approached Hopwood for help completing the play while she was in Europe for the War Department. Hopwood was interested, but did not work on the play when she was overseas.

After Rinehart returned in 1919, Hopwood joined her in Sewickley, Pennsylvania, where she lived; they worked on the play there and in New York City until they completed it. While they worked on The Bat, Wagenhals and Kemper asked them to work on a script for Spanish Love (an adaptation of María del Carmen, an 1896 Spanish play). Writing both plays required Rinehart and Hopwood to work long hours. By early April 1920, they were working on a final, more-humorous round of revisions for The Bat.

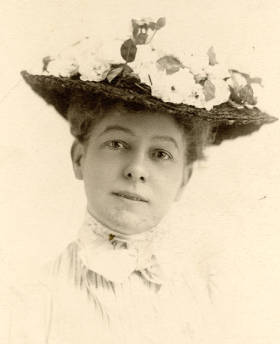
Effie Ellsler played Cornelia in the first Broadway production.

Rinehart and Hopwood finished The Bat during the afternoon of April 11, 1920. She was called away moments later when her daughter-in-law went into labor, and her granddaughter was born early the next day. Rinehart decided to focus on family obligations and missed the reading of the play to Wagenhals and Kemper, who expressed interest in staging it after Hopwood shared a draft with them. She missed The Bat's rehearsals and its Broadway debut, although she attended preview performances.

Before its Broadway opening, the play previewed in Washington, D.C., where it opened at the Belasco Theater on June 14, 1920, as A Thief in the Night. The following week, it previewed in Atlantic City, New Jersey. With Rinehart's preferred title restored, The Bat opened on Broadway at the Morosco Theatre on August 23, 1920. The play was produced by Wagenhals and Kemper; the latter also directed. The Broadway production closed in September 1922 after 867 performances. Before it closed, Wagenhals and Kemper sent six road companies to tour the United States. On January 23, 1922, The Bat opened a 327-performance run in London at St James's Theatre in the West End.

The play was revived twice on Broadway. The first revival, produced by Ben Lundy and directed by Benjamin F. Kamsler, opened on May 31, 1937, at the Majestic Theatre as part of a summer-stock program. Scheduled to run for a week, it was extended and closed after two weeks and 11 performances. The second revival opened on January 20, 1953, at the National Theatre and closed on February 7 after 23 performances.

== Cast and characters ==
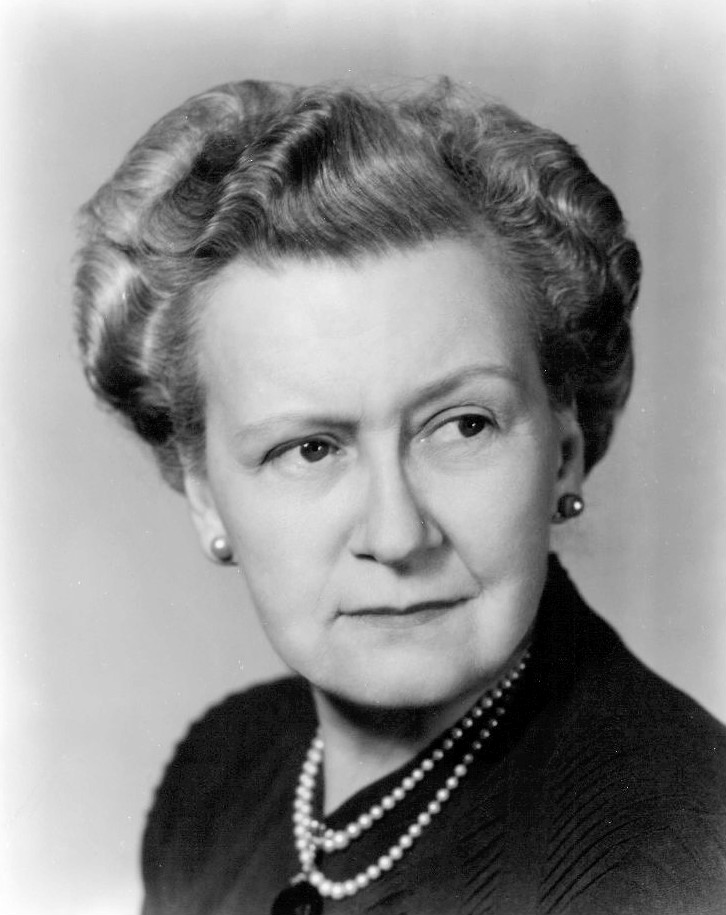
Lucile Watson played Cornelia in the 1953 revival.

The play's lead role is Cornelia Van Gorder, played in the first production by Effie Ellsler. Despite The Bat's unusually long run, Ellsler appeared in almost every performance (including the evening after she heard about her husband's death); she left the part only briefly, after collapsing onstage during the production's final week. The Bat was her last Broadway role.

Wagenhals and Kemper cast Harrison Hunter in the play's title role. They did not show Hunter or the other cast members the final scene (in which the Bat's identity is revealed) until shortly before the dress rehearsal. Hunter, who had thought he was playing a detective, was upset to learn that his role was that of a criminal, although he remained in the role for the entire Broadway run before joining a touring company for the play. At the end of 1922, while still playing the Bat, Hunter became ill and died a week later.

The play's primary comic relief is provided by Lizzie, played in the initial Broadway production by May Vokes. Vokes returned to the role for the 1937 revival, where she was joined by Richard Barrows (also from the original cast, but in a different role). Minnette Barrett, an understudy in the original production, played Cornelia in the revival.

Productions of The Bat included the initial Broadway run, a production in London's West End and two later Broadway revivals, with the following opening-night casts:

Casts of the major productions
Character	Broadway	West End	1937 revival	1953 revival
Lizzie Allen	May Vokes	Drusilla Wills	May Vokes	ZaSu Pitts
Miss Cornelia Van Gorder	Effie Ellsler	Eva Moore	Minnette Barrett	Lucile Watson
Billy	Harry Morvil	Claude Rains	Arvid Paulson	Harry Shaw Lowe
Brooks / Jack Bailey	Stuart Sage	George Relph	Norman Stuart	Peter Hanson
Miss Dale Ogden	Anne Morrison	Nora Swinburne	Linda Lee Hill	Paula Houston
Doctor Wells	Edward Ellis	Alexander Scott-Gatty	Robert Ober	Harry Bannister
Detective Anderson / Masked Man / The Bat	Harrison Hunter	Arthur Wontner	Hermann Lieb	Shepperd Strudwick
Richard "Dick" Fleming	Richard Barrows	C. Stafford Dickens	Matthew Smith	Laurence Haddon
Reginald Beresford	Kenneth Hunter	Herbert Bolingbroke	Eric Kalkhurst	Charles Proctor
Unknown Man / Detective Anderson	Robert Vaughan	Allan Jeayes	Richard Barrows	Raymond Bailey

== Dramatic analysis ==
=== Adaptation ===
To adapt The Circular Staircase for the stage, Rinehart and Hopwood made changes to the characters and plot; the most significant was the addition of the flamboyant criminal whose pseudonym became the play's title. The primary villains in the novel were an embezzling banker and a doctor who helped the banker fake his death. The character names were all changed (Rachel Innes in the novel became Cornelia Van Gorder in the play, her niece Gertrude became Dale, etc.), and some significant characters from the novel were omitted from the play. Despite the changes, the play retained many elements from the novel, including the elderly spinster heroine and her niece staying at a summer house, the hidden room in the house, the conspiracy between the banker and his doctor, and the bank clerk who disguises himself as a gardener.

=== Genre and structure ===
Like The Circular Staircase, The Bat combines mystery and comedy. Most of its comedy is provided by Lizzie, Cornelia's maid. The mystery ends with a twist, in which a character who is supposedly a detective investigating the case is actually the villain. Although similar endings had been used in earlier stage mysteries, it was unexpected enough to fool much of the play's Broadway audience. To maintain plausibility, Rinehart and Hopwood checked the timing of the plot (including events taking place offstage) and rewrote as needed to ensure the timeline was realistic. Hopwood told the New York World that they tried to make the play "absolutely logical and hole-proof".

== Reception ==
=== Box office ===
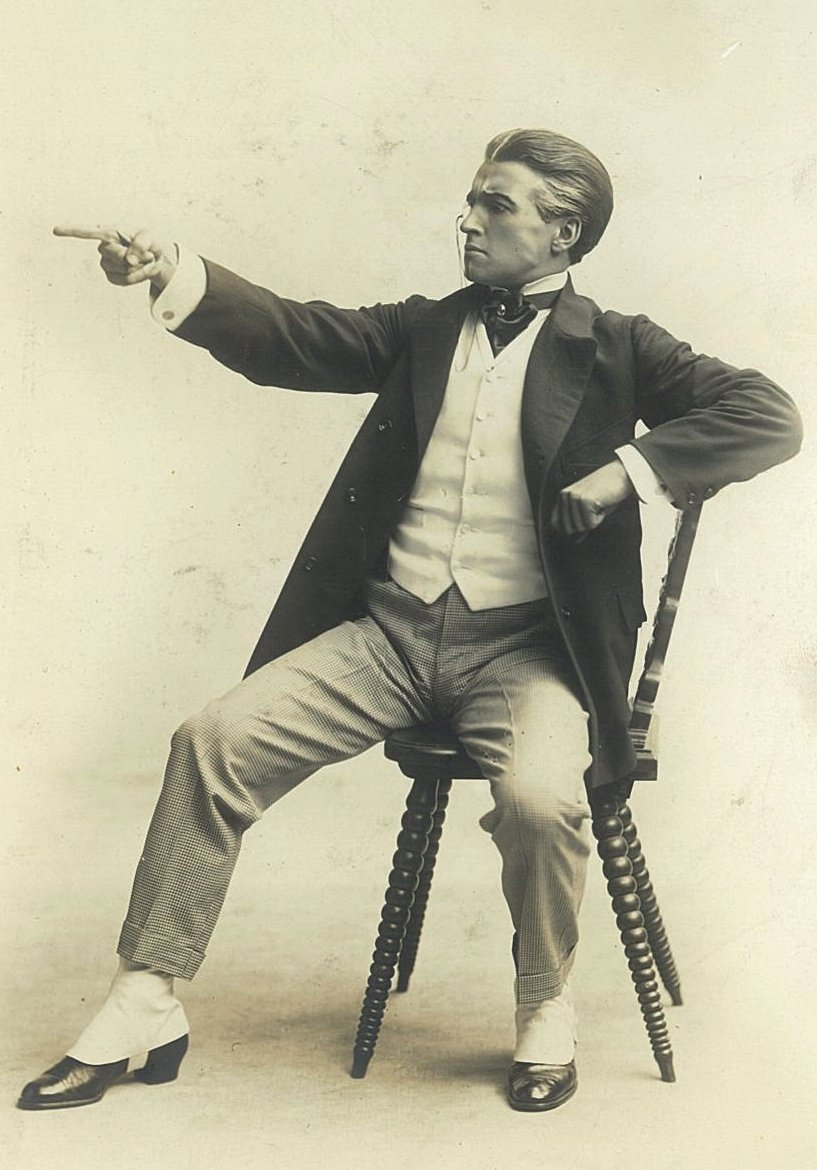
Claude Rains played Billy in the West End production.

With a multi-year Broadway run, over nine months on the West End and several road companies touring concurrently, The Bat was a financial success. In his 1946 profile of Rinehart, Life magazine writer Geoffrey T. Hellman estimated that the play had earned over nine million dollars. It was the most successful play for both its writers and its producers, and was the second-longest-running Broadway production in history at the end of its initial stint. (Note: The longest-running show at that time was Lightnin', which opened on August 26, 1918, and closed on August 27, 1921, after 1291 performances.)

=== Reviews ===
The original Broadway production of The Bat received positive reviews praising its writing and performances. In his New York Times review, Alexander Woollcott described the play as entertaining and well-acted. For the New-York Tribune, Heywood Broun called The Bat better than Spanish Love (which had opened the week before). Broun wrote that The Bat "provided an excellent succession of thrills", although the "interludes of low comedy" with Vokes could have been omitted. A New York Evening Telegram reviewer liked The Bat's comedy and called it "the best mystery play New York has ever seen". According to a Brooklyn Daily Eagle review, The Bat was "three acts full of mystery and fun" and better than Seven Days.

The play's 1922 London production also received positive reviews. In The Spectator, W. J. Turner wrote that the play was thrilling and praised Moore's acting as Cornelia, but disliked Wills's "buffoonery" as Lizzie. The Bystander called The Bat "most exciting from first to last".

When it was revived on Broadway in 1937, reviewers said that the play had not aged well due to many imitations by subsequent plays. For the New York Times, Brooks Atkinson wrote that it was "not quite the shriek show it was originally" but still entertaining. According to the Brooklyn Daily Eagle's Arthur Pollock, The Bat showed its age and was more amusing than frightening. Although Atkinson was more favorable about the 1953 revival and the older story's "innocence", other reviewers considered it dated.

== Adaptations and legacy ==
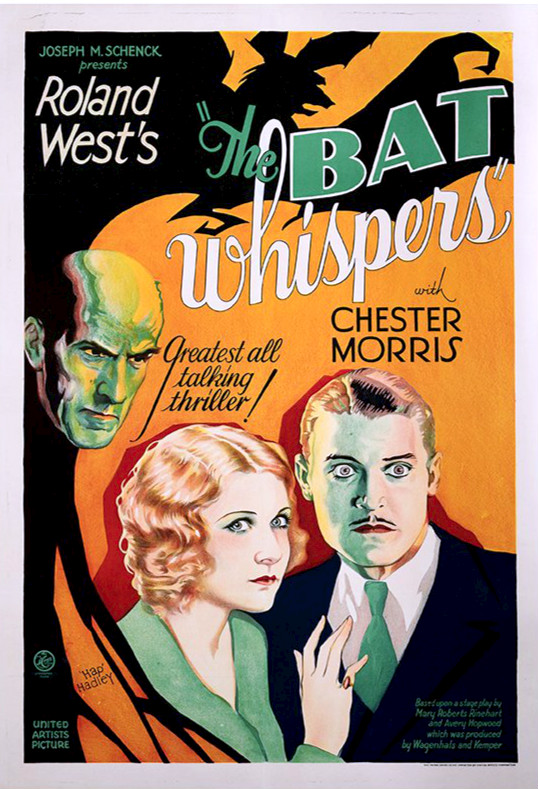
The 1930 film, The Bat Whispers, was based on the play.

The Bat is considered a classic example of comedy-mystery; drama critic Joseph Twadell Shipley called it "the most popular and most shiverful of our murder mystery dramas". Many of its elements are now clichés. The Bat's success encouraged imitators to set mysteries mixed with comedy in old, dark houses which some of the characters think are haunted. The Cat and the Canary by John Willard opened on Broadway in February 1922 and ran for 349 performances. Another successful imitation was Crane Wilbur's The Monster, which opened on Broadway in August of that year. Ralph Spence's 1925 play, The Gorilla, parodied the genre; according to its advertisements, it "outbats The Bat".

Film versions soon followed, including a 1925 adaptation of The Monster and multiple adaptations of The Cat and the Canary and The Gorilla. By the late 1920s, the mysteries' popularity was declining in live theater, although the genre continued in films such as James Whale's The Old Dark House (1932) and several adaptations of The Bat.

=== Films ===
Rinehart sold the film rights to The Circular Staircase to film producer William Selig's Selig Polyscope Company in 1915, and he released a film version of the novel that year. Rinehart purchased the rights back from Selig in 1920 to avoid conflicts over potential film adaptations of The Bat. But in 1921, Selig re-released his film as The Bat to capitalize on the play's success. Wagenhals and Kemper filed suit to block Selig's use of the title.

The Bat (1926)

Three films were based on the original Broadway play. The first, a silent film also called The Bat, was produced and directed by Roland West, who co-wrote the screenplay with Julien Josephson and George Marion Jr. Cornelia was played by Emily Fitzroy, and Eddie Gribbon was the Bat. West's wife, Jewel Carmen, played Dale Ogden as her last film role. West made the actors work at night to get them in the mood for the thriller. The film was released by United Artists on March 14, 1926. The year before, West had directed an adaptation of one of The Bat's imitators, The Monster. Critics considered The Bat to be an improvement over that previous film; it received positive reviews and did well at the box office. The film was considered lost for decades, but a print was discovered in the 1980s.

Following the commercialization of sound films, West remade the story four years later as The Bat Whispers; the modified title emphasized the remake's use of sound. The remake, released by United Artists on November 29, 1930, starred Chester Morris as the Bat and Una Merkel as Dale; British actress Grayce Hampton played Cornelia. West experimented with early widescreen technology by having two cinematographers film different versions of the movie, one with a standard 35 mm camera, the other with a new 65 mm "Magnifilm" camera. Like the earlier silent film adaptation, The Bat Whispers was considered lost until the UCLA Film and Television Archive restored both the standard and widescreen versions from rediscovered negatives in 1988. The film received mixed reviews and the experiment with widescreen was a financial failure. Comic-book creator Bob Kane said in his 1989 autobiography, Batman and Me, that the villain in The Bat Whispers inspired his character Batman. (Note: Some film historians believe Kane may have also seen the 1926 silent adaptation, because specific images in that film resemble the Bat-Signal.)

The Bat (1959)

Crane Wilbur wrote and directed a third adaptation of The Bat, which was released by Allied Artists on August 9, 1959. This version emphasized horror, with the Bat (played by Gavin Gordon) ripping out the throats of his victims. Dr. Wells (played by horror star Vincent Price) had a more prominent role, and Agnes Moorehead co-starred as Cornelia. This adaptation received mixed reviews when released. It is widely available because its copyright expired, placing it in the public domain.

=== Other adaptations ===
To reinforce the distinction between The Bat and The Circular Staircase, a novelization of the play was published by George H. Doran Company in 1926. Although the adaptation was credited to Rinehart and Hopwood, it was ghostwritten by Stephen Vincent Benét.

The Bat was adapted for television several times. The WOR-TV anthology series Broadway Television Theatre aired its version on November 23, 1953, with a cast that included Estelle Winwood, Alice Pearce and Jay Jostyn. On March 31, 1960, NBC-TV made The Bat the first of its Dow Hour of Great Mysteries specials. Helen Hayes, Margaret Hamilton and Jason Robards starred in that version. On July 30, 1978, the West German network Hessischer Rundfunk broadcast a television movie version entitled Der Spinnenmörder. It was rebroadcast by Austria's Österreichischer Rundfunk on August 5.

In August 1992, Adventure Comics published a one-shot comic book adaptation of the play. The comic significantly altered the story to make Cornelia Van Gorder younger and give her an evil twin who is the murderer.
