= Had I but known =

Form of prolepsis or foreshadowing

"Had I but known" is a form of prolepsis or foreshadowing that hints at some looming in which the speaker laments their course of action that precipitates an unintended consequence .

Classically, the narrator never makes explicit the nature of the mistake until the reader has realized the consequence of the error. If done well, this literary device can add suspense or dramatic irony; if overdone, it invites comparison of the story to Victorian melodrama.

The foreshadowing may be distinguished from "advance notice": for example, "Had I but known then what I know now, I would never have set foot on Baron von Rotschnitzel's private yacht". The more subtle "advance mention": "a 'simple marker without anticipation' intended to acquire significance later in the narrative, through analeptic recovery.' [in other words:]...clues".

== Mystery plot ==
The phrase is used to refer to a type of mystery plot, adopted by a group of Golden Age mystery writers, mostly female. The narrator keeps key pieces of evidence from the police, apparently for the sole purpose of prolonging their work.

The HIBK school is associated with the works of Mary Roberts Rinehart, specifically The Circular Staircase (1908), in which "a middle-aged spinster is persuaded by her niece and nephew to rent a country house for the summer. The house they choose belonged to a bank defaulter who had hidden stolen securities in the walls. The gentle, peace-loving trio is plunged into a series of crimes solved with the help of the aunt. This novel is credited with being the first of its type.

Other members of the HIBK school include Ethel Lina White and Lenore Glen Offord.

The HIBK school was parodied by Ogden Nash in his poem "Don't Guess, Let Me Tell You":

Had-I-But-Known narrators are the ones who hear a stealthy creak at midnight in the tower where the body lies, and, instead of locking their door or arousing the drowsy policeman posted outside their room, sneak off by themselves to the tower and suddenly they hear a breath exhaled behind them,

And they have no time to scream, they know nothing else till the men from the D.A.'s office come in next morning and find them.

...

And when the killer is finally trapped into a confession by some elaborate device of the Had I But Known-er some hundred pages later than if they hadn't held their knowledge aloof,

Why, they say, why Inspector I knew all along it was he but I couldn't tell you, you would have laughed at me unless I had absolute proof.

== See also ==
- Narrative mode
