= The Circular Staircase =

1908 mystery novel by American Mary Roberts Rinehart

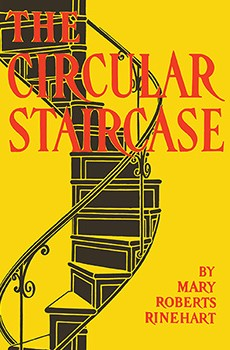
- Author: Mary Roberts Rinehart
- Language: English
- Genre: Novel
- Publisher: Bobbs-Merrill
- Publication date: 1908
- Publication place: United States
- Media type: Print (hardback)
- Pages: 362

The Circular Staircase is a mystery novel by American writer Mary Roberts Rinehart. The story follows dowager Rachel Innes as she thwarts a series of strange crimes at a summer house she has rented with her niece and nephew. The novel was Rinehart's first bestseller and established her as one of the era's most popular writers. The story was serialized in All-Story for five issues starting with the November 1907 issue, then published in book form by Bobbs-Merrill in 1908.

Rinehart was inspired to write the novel after a visit to Melrose, a Gothic Revival castle in Northern Virginia.

The Circular Staircase pioneered what became known as the "had I but known" school of mystery writing, which often feature female protagonists and narrators who foreshadow impending danger and plot developments by reflecting on what they might have done differently. Rinehart employed this formula in many of her later works, and it inspired dozens of subsequent stories. The novel was adapted for the screen twice: as a silent film in 1915, and for the television series Climax! in 1956. Its best known adaptation was as the play The Bat, which became a major Broadway hit and inspired a number of later works, including several adaptations of its own.

== Plot ==
Rachel Innes is a spinster who has had custody of her orphaned niece and nephew since they were children. The siblings Halsey and Gertrude are now 24 and 20, respectively, and they talk Rachel into renting a house in the country for the summer. The country-house is owned by the Armstrong family (who are currently away on vacation), and currently only has a housekeeper named Mary.

Upon arriving Rachel and her long-time maid Lydia set about hiring staff and setting up in the house before Halsey and Gertrude arrive the next day. They receive an ominous warning that there is a ghost in the house from Thomas, an older man who has worked for the Armstrongs for many years and agrees to return and work as a butler for Rachel. The first night Lydia and Rachel are awoken by the sounds of an intruder sneaking around and dropping a metal golf stick on a staircase. The next morning Gertrude and Halsey arrive along with Jack Bailey, a local banker who is a friend to Halsey and engaged to Gertrude.

The next night Rachel is again woken by a loud sound and a dead body is found at the bottom of a circular set of stairs. The police arrive led by Detective Jamieson and the body is identified as Arnold Armstrong, the estranged son of the house owner Paul Armstrong. Halsey and Jack are both missing and while searching for them Rachel discovers Halsey's pistol thrown into a tulip bed. She hides this discovery from the police who question both her and Gertrude. Gertrude provides an alibi for Halsey and Jack, claiming they left just before Arnold was shot to death.

Rachel is determined to remain in the house until the mystery is solved and her nephew is cleared of all suspicion despite the fact that there continue to be break-ins and mysterious tapping noises during the night. A few days later Halsey returns without Jack and refuses to provide any explanations. Jack and Halsey both had a poor relationship with Arnold because Arnold treated Gertrude badly. The day Halsey returns news breaks that the local bank (which is owned by Paul Armstrong, and where Jack works, and also where Halsey and Gertrude keep their substantial inheritance) has gone bankrupt because someone who worked there stole a bunch of money. Suspicion immediately falls on the missing Jack Bailey, who turns himself into police custody that day proclaiming his innocence.

Jack is released from police custody due to claimed illness. Rachel continues to investigate and hires a new gardener on the recommendation of Halsey. She discovers that Thomas and the housekeeper Mary have been hiding a very ill Louise Armstrong (the step-daughter of Paul Armstrong and fiance of Halsey) in the groundskeeper's house. News arrives that Paul Armstrong has died due to heart disease and poor health. Thomas the groundskeeper dies of a fright-induced heart attack not much later.

The stable is lit on fire as a distraction so someone can break into the house, but Rachel realizes this and manages to shoot the would-be-burglar in the foot but the burglar still gets away. Louise breaks off her engagement with Halsey against her own wishes to marry the local Dr. Walker. Late at night Detective Jamieson and the new gardener wake up Rachel and take her to a graveyard, where they dig up the grave of Paul Armstrong and determine that the body in the grave is not that of Paul Armstrong. When Halsey finds out he takes off angrily, and then his car is found crashed into a train with him still missing. Halsey remains missing for several days until finally being discovered tied up in a train car by a hobo. Investigation into the bank fraud determines it was Paul Armstrong who stole the money, not Jack Bailey. Paul Armstrong had then hid the money in his house in a secret room and faked his own death, promising Dr. Walker a marriage with his stepdaughter Louise if Walker would go along with the plan. Paul and Walker had been the burglars trying to break into the house over the past month.

Paul dies when he falls down the stairs while fleeing from the police after breaking into his mansion again. Arnold Armstrong was shot by the housekeeper Mary, who was the sister of Arnold's secret ex-wife. Mary's sister had died giving birth to Arnold's child and Mary had been raising the child without any help from Arnold for several years. After Arnold was disinherited from his family he began to blackmail Mary by threatening to take his child away from her if she did not give him money. He also beat her with a golf stick. Jack Bailey had disguised himself as the new gardener to help with the investigation and ultimately cleared his name of all charges and marries Gertrude. Halsey and Louise also got back together after her stepfather died.

== Adaptations ==
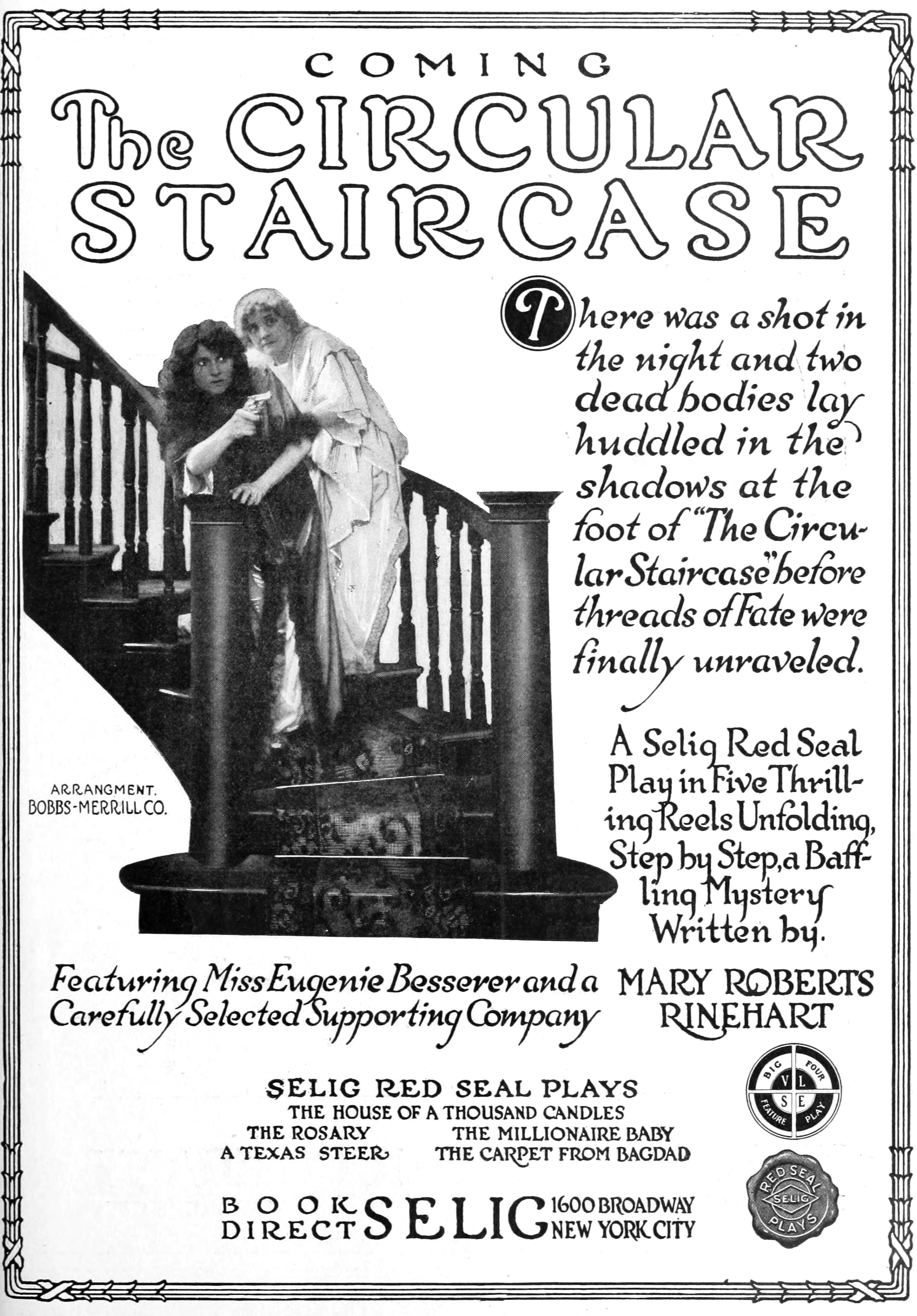
Advertisement for film version, 1915

In 1912, Rinehart's friend Beatrice DeMille, mother of Cecil B. Demille, tried to work out a deal for her son's new film company to purchase the rights to The Circular Staircase and another Rinehart story. Though this failed to come together, Rinehart was soon able to sell her work to film companies, beginning with a group of comic stories that Essanay Studios adapted as short films in 1914. In 1915, Rinehart sold the film rights to The Circular Staircase to Selig Polyscope Company for an apparently small amount. The silent film, released in 1915, was the first feature-length adaptation of Rinehart's work. It was directed by Edward LeSaint and starred Guy Oliver as Halsey, Eugenie Besserer as Ray, and Stella Razeto as Gertrude. It received lukewarm reviews; one critic wrote that it followed the novel too closely to be effectively cinematic. The film is now lost.

The Circular Staircase was also adapted for an episode of the television series Climax! that aired on June 21, 1956. The episode starred Judith Anderson as Rachel Innes.

Ed Dixon adapted The Circular Staircase into Whodunit... The Musical.

=== The Bat ===
The Circular Staircase's most notable adaptation was as the 1920 stage play The Bat. Rinehart started working on the play in 1917 with Avery Hopwood; they made a number of alterations to the source to prepare it for the stage. They renamed characters, changed plot elements, and most significantly, added the titular villain, who disguises his identity under a frightening bat costume until the play's denouement. The Bat opened on August 23, 1920 at Broadway's Morosco Theatre. It was an immediate success with both audiences and critics. It ran for 878 performances in New York, and six additional companies took the show to other cities, in addition to a later London production and numerous individual performances. The play was extremely lucrative for Rinehart and her husband Stan, who had invested much of their wealth into it.

Rinehart later denied that The Bat was connected to The Circular Staircase after the works' similarities led to legal troubles over film rights. In 1920, Rineheart bought back The Circular Staircase rights from Selig Polyscope, and hoped to license The Bat for a film. However, Selig re-released the 1915 Circular Staircase under the title The Bat. Rinehart tried to file suit to keep Selig from using the title. The Bat led to several adaptations of its own. In 1926, Rinehart licensed a novelization of The Bat, published under her name but ghostwritten by Stephen Vincent Benét, partly to distance The Bat from The Circular Staircase. It was filmed three times: as the 1926 silent film The Bat, as the 1930 talking film The Bat Whispers, and as the 1959 horror picture The Bat. The Bat Whispers inspired Bob Kane to create the heroic comics character Batman.
