= May Vokes =

American actress (18??–1957)

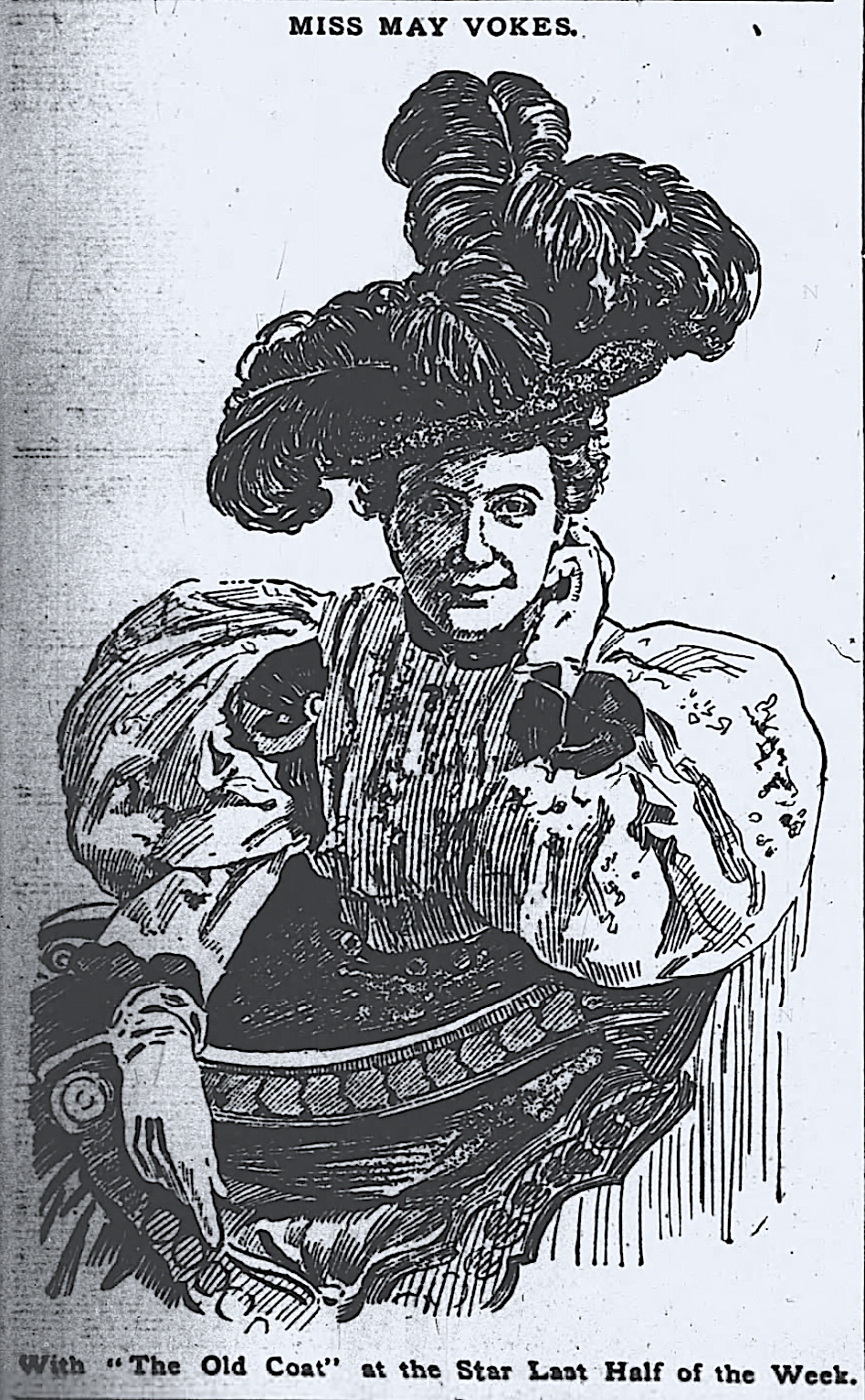
1898 sketch of actress May Vokes

May Vokes (18?? – September 13, 1957) was an American actress and comedienne. She had an active career on the American stage from 1889 until 1937. A Chicago native, she was trained as an actress at the Chicago Conservatory where she performed in multiple student productions in 1888 and 1889. She toured the United States in a production of Tom Sawyer in 1889, and was active in American regional theaters before making her Broadway debut as the maid Tilly in My Friend From India in 1896. She returned frequently to Broadway for the remainder of her career. She retired after making her final Broadway appearance in the revival of The Bat in 1937.

== Life and career ==
May Vokes was born in Chicago and studied drama at the Chicago Conservatory where her fellow classmates included Olive May and Mabel Eaton. She was a student performer at the Chicago Conservatory in productions staged in 1888 and 1889. She began her career as a professional actress around this time. In 1889 she portrayed Jessie Sawyer in a touring production of Tom Sawyer adapted from the novel by Mark Twain. In 1890 she toured as Mary Ann in A Base Hit in American regional theatres. In the 1890-1891 season she toured in the musical burlesque Faust Up to Date.

In 1892 Vokes joined Margaret Mather's acting troupe; appearing as Gertrude in The Egyptian. In 1893 she starred in a new play by R. J. Donnelly, Cannon Ball Express, at the Park Theatre in Indianapolis, Indiana. In 1894-1895 she toured the United States with her own troupe, the May Vokes Comedy Company. Plays performed by the organization included A Literary Feller (as Flossie) Blue Blood, Penelope, and A Mountain Waif among other comedies.

In 1896 Vokes made her Broadway debut at the Bijou Theatre as the maid Tilly in My Friend From India. She was very successful in this part and proclaimed a great "discovery" by the New York critics. She continued to play Tilly on tour after the Broadway run closed in 1897. In 1898 she performed the role of an eccentric scrub woman in a new comedy The Old Coat by W. H. Alldridge first in Buffalo and then on Broadway at the Bijou Theatre. It was produced by Edward E. Rice.

Vokes maintained a busy schedule on the New York stage that lasted until 1937 when she gave her final Broadway performance as Lizzie Allen in The Bat; a role that had first brought her acclaim in the 1920 Broadway production. She appeared primarily in comedic roles in stage plays. Some of her many other Broadway appearances included When Dreams Come True, Doctor X, A Fool and His Money, and The Quaker Girl. She appeared in the films Janice Meredith in 1924 and Get That Venus in 1933.

Vokes was married to Ballard Preston Lester, whose name was reported as Robert. She died at Stamford Hospital on September 13, 1957, in Stamford, Connecticut.
