= Mary Roberts Rinehart Nature Park =

Nature park in southwest Pennsylvania, USA

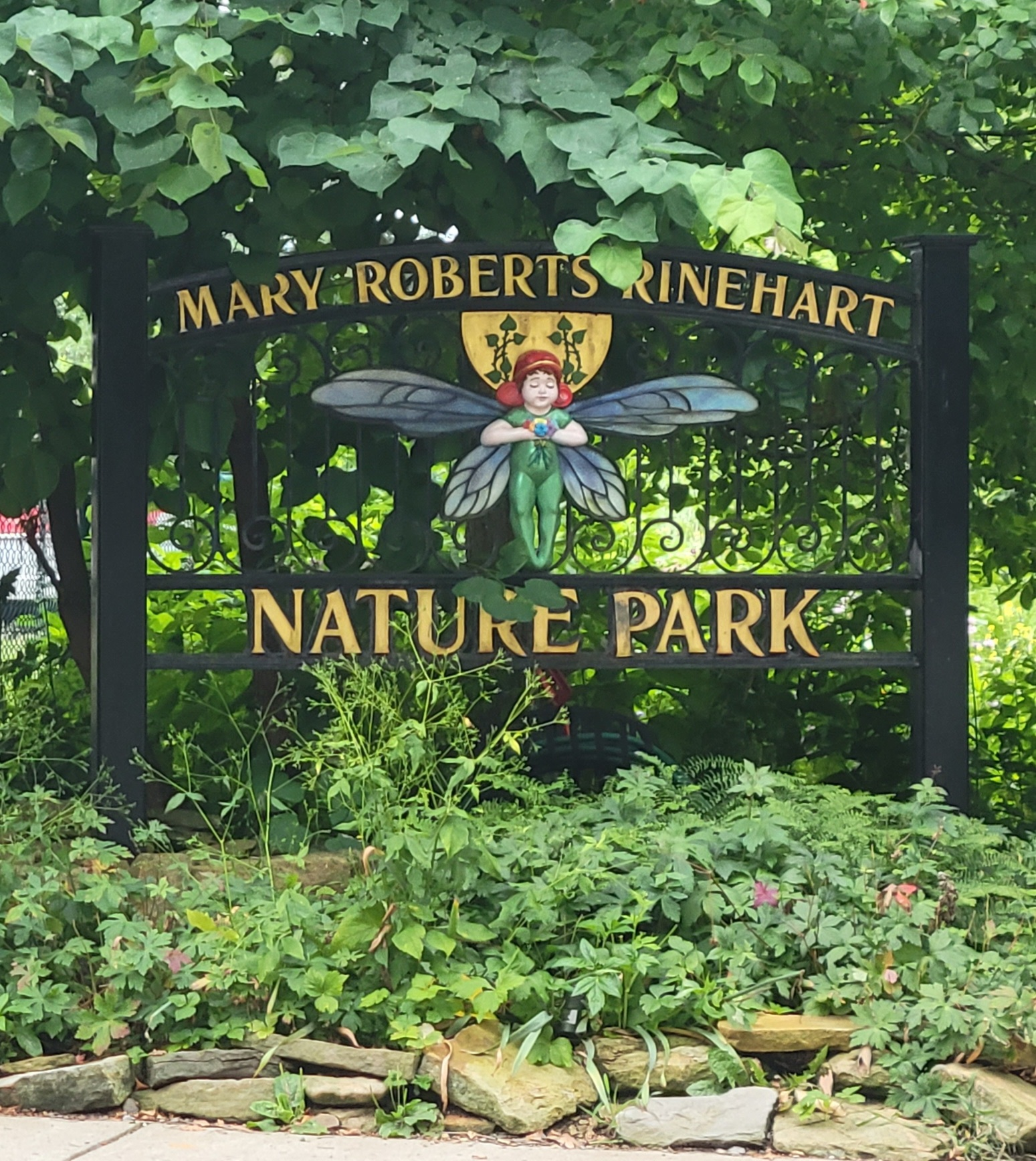

- Location within Pennsylvania Location within the United States
- Type: Municipal
- Location: Allegheny County, Pennsylvania
- Coordinates: 40.531679°N 80.169186°W
- Area: 3-acre (0 km^{2})
- Created: 2008

Mary Roberts Rinehart Nature Park (MRRNP) is located in Glen Osborne, near Sewickley, in NW Allegheny County, PA about 11 miles NW of the City of Pittsburgh. It is located next to Quaker Valley School District's Osborne Elementary Campus. The Park, named in 2008, is managed by the Osborne Trail and Park Association (OTPA). MRRNP is named for Mary Roberts Rinehart, the 20th century American Mystery writer, born in 1876 in Allegheny City (now Pittsburgh's Northside), who lived in Glen Osborne from 1911 to 1922 in an estate adjacent to the park location.

MRRNP features walking trails that wind through rich Ravine and Floodplain Forest Communities, including Sycamore (Box-Elder) Floodplain Forest and remnant Green Ash - Mixed Hardwood Floodplain Forest, following a stream, and passing planted demonstration Pollinator and Barrens gardens. The nature park also showcases several artistic hardscape features made by local artisans including a hand-built stone amphitheater and a stone firepit ring made by Eston Owens, a wrought iron sign made by George Gaadt, and a custom made powder coated steel front perimeter fence made by Collin Carrier of London Pattern: Hand crafted metalwork. The fire pit may be used with prior approval.

The park has been a host location for Sewickley StoryWalk®, a self-guided walking tour where enlarged laminated pages of illustrated children's books are placed in series along the routes.
