= Charles Dow Clark =

American football player, coach, referee, and actor

Biographical details
- Born: May 8, 1869; St. Albans, Vermont, U.S.
- Died: March 26, 1959 (aged 89); New York, New York, U.S.
- Education: Tufts (1895)

Playing career
- 1893: Tufts

Coaching career (HC unless noted)
- 1894: Ole Miss

Charles Dow Clark (September 21, 1869 – March 26, 1959) was an actor and an American football coach and referee. He served as the head football coach at the University of Mississippi while taking a leave from his studies at Tufts College in Medford, Massachusetts.

Clark became an actor, appearing in such films as The Bat Whispers (1930) and It Happened in Hollywood (1937). He died on March 26, 1959, at Lenox Hill Hospital in Manhattan.
