= The Case of Jennie Brice =

1913 novel by Mary Roberts Rinehart

- First edition
- Author: Mary Roberts Rinehart
- Language: English
- Genre: Novel
- Publisher: Bobbs-Merrill Company
- Publication date: 1913
- Publication place: United States
- Media type: Print (hardback)
- Pages: 227
- OCLC: 220715835
- Preceded by: Mind Over Motor
- Followed by: Street of Seven Stars

The Case of Jennie Brice is a 1913 crime novel by the American writer Mary Roberts Rinehart (1876–1956) set in 1904 in Allegheny, Pennsylvania, which has been a part of the city of Pittsburgh since 1907.

== Plot ==
A blood-stained rope, and towel, and a missing tenant, Jennie Brice—all of which convince Mrs. Pittman that a murder has been committed in her boarding house. But without a body, the police say there is no case. Pittman tries to ferret out the killer by using the key to Jennie's apartment to investigate.

The novel was published with illustrations by M. Leone Bracker. The Boston Evening Transcript called the novel "a well-spun yarn" and praised its originality and unusual setting.
