= The Door (Rinehart novel) =

1930 novel by Mary Roberts Rinehart

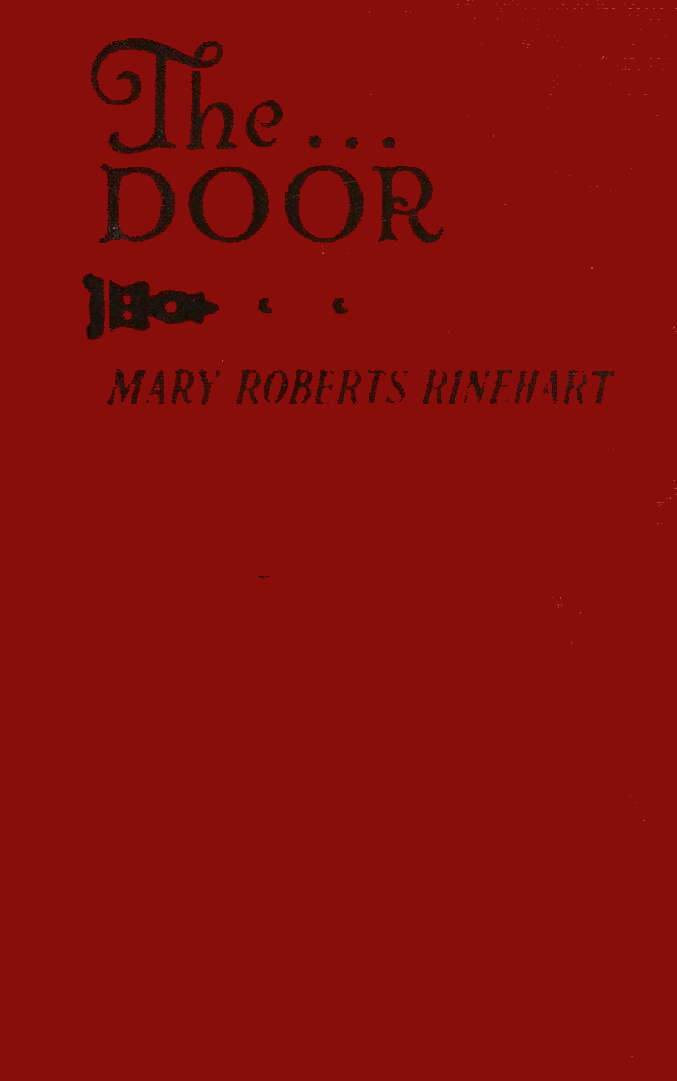
- Illustration of the first US edition
- Author: Mary Roberts Rinehart
- Language: English
- Genre: Detective fiction
- Publisher: Farrar & Rinehart
- Publication date: 1930
- Publication place: United States
- Media type: print
- Pages: 314 (first edition)
- Text: The Door at Wikisource

The Door is a novel by American writer Mary Roberts Rinehart. It was first published in the United States by Farrar & Rinehart on March 28, 1930.

Rinehart, who had been a prominent author since 1907, wrote The Door quickly while recovering from an illness in a hospital for her two sons, who had launched the publishing house Farrar & Rinehart and wanted an early commercial success. Rinehart broke her long-standing contract with Doubleday and published the novel. It was a No. 1 bestseller.

== Critical reception ==
Upon the release of The Door, Isaac Anderson, in a review for The New York Times, praised the book, stating that "once more Mary Roberts Rinehart has proved that she has the technique of the mystery story at her fingers' ends". The Eagle Rock Advertiser called it "a mystery that will puzzle the most astute reader". The Guardian called it "otherwise forgettable" and "cranked out at top speed". In a 2024 review, Kirkus Reviews called it "one of the best kickers in the genre", also noting that "despite the inevitably dated social structure and some racist language, the tale maintains decorous but mounting levels of suspense all the way through to its final line".

The book is also considered to be the earliest known source of the phrase "the butler did it", although the exact phrase does not appear in her work and the plot device had been used prior to that time.
