= The Bat (1926 film) =

1926 film directed by Roland West

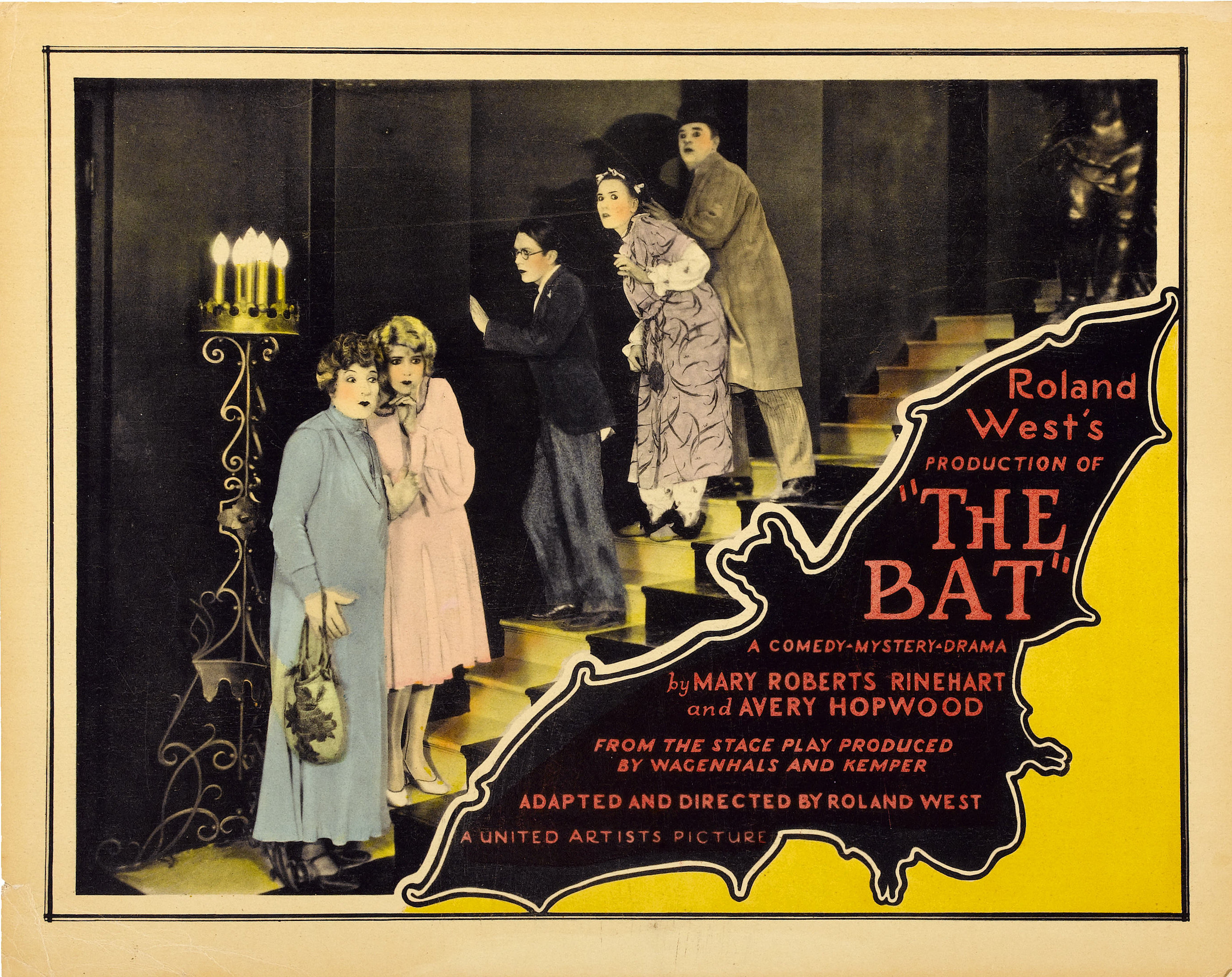
- Lobby card
- Directed by: Roland West
- Written by: Roland West
- Story by: The Bat by: Mary Roberts Rinehart; Avery Hopwood
- Produced by: Roland West
- Starring: André Beranger; Tullio Carminatti; Charles Herzinger; Emily Fitzroy; Jewel Carmen; Louise Fazenda; Arthur Housman; Robert McKim
- Cinematography: Arthur Edeson
- Production companies: Feature Productions, Inc.
- Distributed by: United Artists Corp.
- Release date: 14 March 1926 (New York)
- Running time: 1 hour, 26 minutes
- Country: United States
- Language: Silent

The Bat

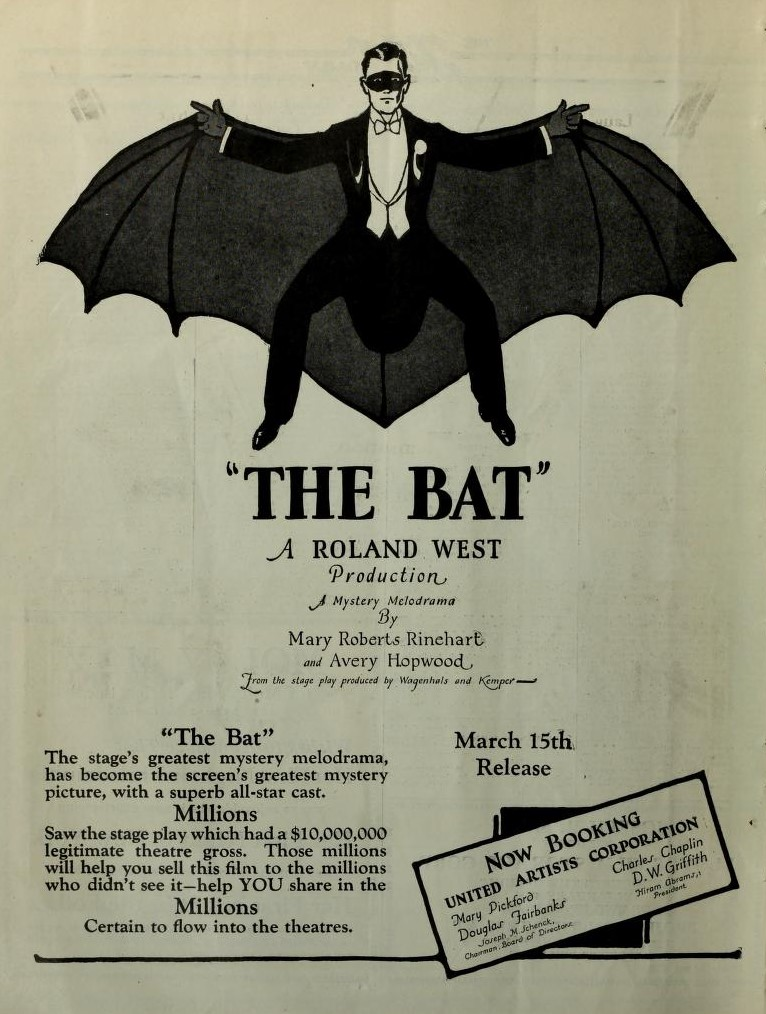
The Bat, A Roland West Production, 1926

The Bat is a 1926 American silent comedy mystery film directed by Roland West and starring Jack Pickford and Louise Fazenda. The film is based on the 1920 Broadway hit play The Bat by Mary Roberts Rinehart and Avery Hopwood.

== Plot ==
Gideon Bell, owner of the Favre Emeralds, receives a letter stating that the emeralds will be stolen at midnight by "the Bat", and that police will not be able to stop the robbery. The Bat, a figure dressed as a bat, murders Gideon and steals the emeralds. The Bat leaves a bat-shaped note for the chief of police to inform him that he will be traveling to the country. The Bat travels by car to a mansion built by Courtleigh Fleming, the president of the Oakdale Bank, who has recently been found dead in Colorado. The mansion is being rented for the summer by writer Cornelia Van Gorder, whose maid, Lizzie Allen, sets up a bear trap to catch the Bat. Richard Fleming, Courtleigh's spendthrift nephew, wishes to lease the mansion, and plans with Dr. H. E. Wells to frighten Van Gorder away.

The newspaper reports that Brooks Bailey, a cashier at Oakdale Bank, has robbed the bank of $200,000 and has disappeared. Van Gorder's niece, Miss Dale Ogden, arrives with a supposed new gardener. Van Gorder asks the gardener about his knowledge on alopecia, urticaria, and rubeola, and he answers as if the terms referred to plants rather than medical conditions. On the staircase, Richard is shot, and Miss Dale manages to snatch part of a blueprint of the house from his pocket. Detective Moletti accuses her of trying to find a supposed hidden room in the mansion that should be shown on the blueprint. Detective Anderson arrives, and the group gets a call from the house phone in the garage, which sounds like groans of distress. A circular light shines on the wall, with the shadow of a bat in its center, but after investigating, the group finds that the shape was caused by a miller moth on a car headlight.

Dr. Wells has Miss Dale recreate Richard's murder, and she notes that she tucked the blueprint in a Parker House roll on a tray, but the blueprint is now gone. The new gardener is revealed to be Brooks Bailey, and Anderson attempts to arrest him for robbery, murder, and impersonation, but Miss Dale stops him, revealing that she and Brooks are engaged. Dr. Wells searches for the hidden room by knocking on walls, which causes the others to investigate the sound, leading them to a ballroom which is supposedly haunted. The candles in the ballroom go out when lit, and a shape appears to float towards Anderson and Lizzie, but it turns out to be the Japanese butler Billy carrying a lamp. After being confronted by Moletti, Dr. Wells knocks Moletti unconscious by striking his head, and he hides Moletti's body in another room. A beaten man enters the house, and Anderson finds that he has no identification on his person.

Billy sees a mysterious figure wearing a hat, and as he leaves to tell the others, the Bat's shadow passes by the door. The Bat sets up a system of wires that attach to a light switch. Outside, Brooks sees the figure in the hat crossing the roof, and realizes that it is the supposedly dead Courtleigh Fleming. Miss Dale finds the hidden room, located behind a fireplace. The Bat confronts her, demanding the combination to the safe in the hidden room, but she escapes. Dr. Wells is accused of helping the Bat, and the Bat is soon captured and held at gunpoint. However, the Bat activates the wire system, turning off the lights and allowing himself to escape. The Bat flees outside but his leg is caught in the bear trap placed earlier by Lizzie. The others find him and remove his mask, revealing him to be Moletti. The beaten, unknown man announces that he is the true Detective Moletti, and that the man underneath the Bat's mask had stolen his papers, locked him in the garage, set it on fire and impersonated him.

== Cast ==
- Emily Fitzroy as Miss Cornelia Van Gorder
- Jack Pickford as Brooks Bailey
- Jewel Carmen as Miss Dale Ogden
- Robert McKim as Dr. H. E. Wells
- Arthur Housman as Richard Fleming (billed as Arthur Houseman)
- Louise Fazenda as Lizzie Allen
- Tullio Carminati as Detective Moletti
- Eddie Gribbon as Detective Anderson
- George Beranger as Gideon Bell (billed as Andre de Beranger)
- Charles Herzinger as Courtleigh Fleming
- Sojin Kamiyama as Billy, the Butler
- Lee Shumway as the Unknown

== Production ==
The Bat film is adapted from the play The Bat by Mary Roberts Rinehart and Avery Hopwood. The play was based on Rinehart's own 1908 mystery novel The Circular Staircase, which had been filmed in 1915 by the Selig Polyscope Company.

The film was directed and adapted to screen by Roland West. Among the cast was Jewel Carmen, who West had met in 1918.

West had his cast work at night, stating that "Given the quiet of the studio at midnight, when no other companies are working, and plenty of spooky music from an orchestra, the players really are in a mood to simulate dark deeds." According to William Bakewell, who worked with West on The Bat Whispers, West worked at night to avoid dealing with studio executives.

== Release ==
The Bat premiered in New York on March 14, 1926. According to The Motion Picture World magazine, the film was a "box office knock-out".

The film was considered lost for decades, until a print was discovered in the 1980s.

== Reception ==
George T. Pardy stated in The Motion Picture World, praised the films balance of sudden humor with "eerie, creepy, blood-curdling atmosphere." An anonymous reviewer in The New York Times found the film entertaining despite "mechanical twists." Sisk of Variety stated the film was an "excellent picture [...] interesting every minute of the way" and praised Carminati's performance as "one of the best things done by a newcomer on the screen."

== Legacy ==
West created a sound version of The Bat titled The Bat Whispers. Both films became major inspirations for Bob Kane in creating his iconic Batman character.

== Notes ==
=== References ===
- "The Bat". AFI Catalog of Feature Films. American Film Institute.
- Hallenbeck, Bruce G. (2009). Comedy-Horror Films: A Chronological History, 1914–2008. Jefferson, North Carolina: McFarland. ISBN 978-0-7864-3332-2. OCLC 838246655.
- Klepper, Robert K. (2005) [1999]. Silent Films, 1877–1996: A Critical Guide to 646 Movies. Jefferson, North Carolina: McFarland. ISBN 978-0-7864-2164-0. OCLC 439709956.
- Soister, John T. & Nicolella, Henry (2012). American Silent Horror, Science Fiction and Fantasy Feature Films, 1913–1929. Jefferson, North Carolina: McFarland. ISBN 978-0-7864-3581-4. OCLC 940027817.
- Vieira, Mark A. (2003). Hollywood Horror: From Gothic to Cosmic. New York: Harry N. Abrams, Inc. ISBN 0-8109-4535-5.
- Donati, William (2012). The Life and Death of Thelma Todd. McFarland & Company, Inc. ISBN 978-0-7864-6518-7.
