= Mary Roberts Rinehart =

American mystery writer (1876–1958)

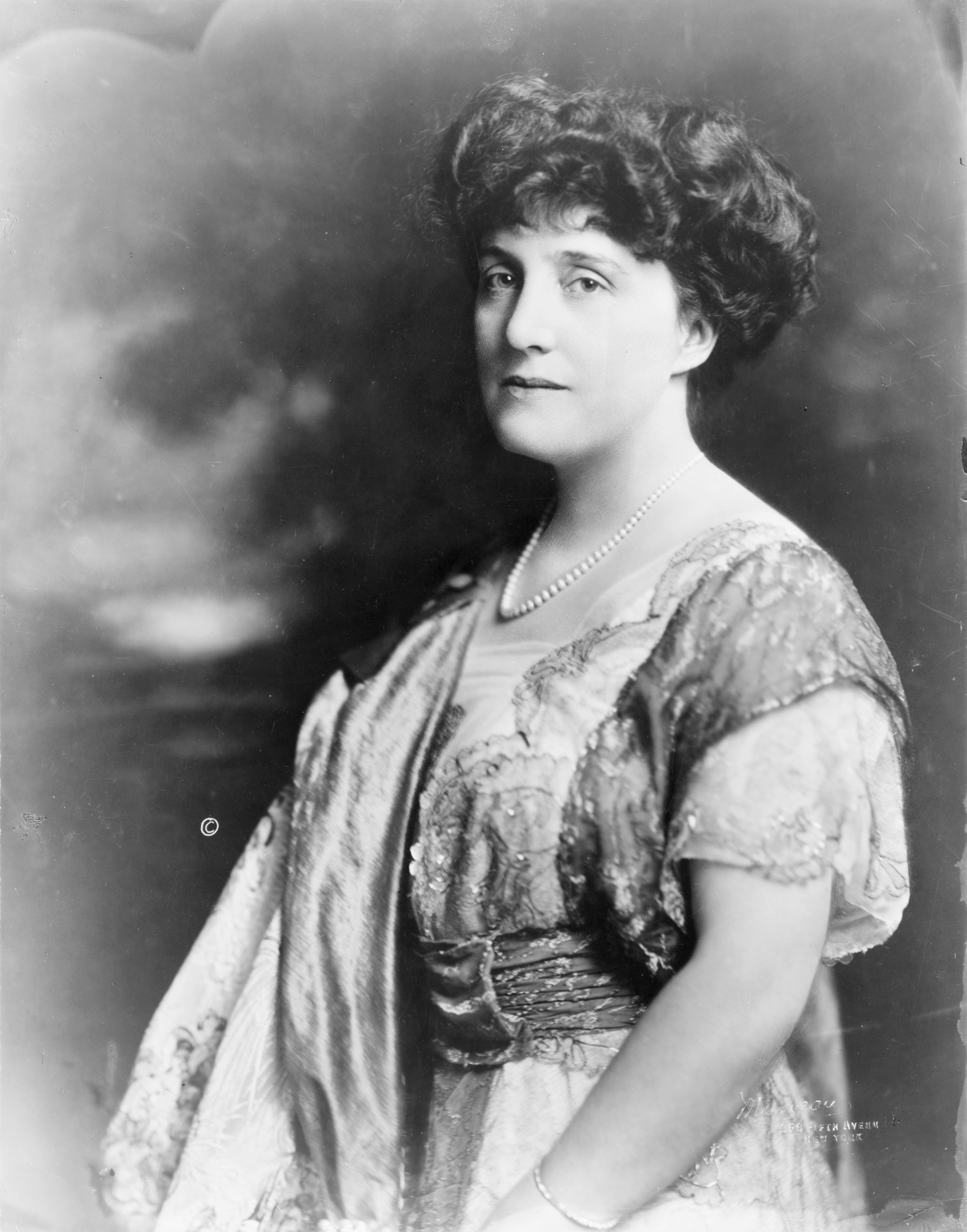
- Mary Roberts Rinehart (1914)
- Born: Mary Ella Roberts; August 12, 1876; Allegheny City, Pennsylvania (now Pittsburgh), U.S.
- Died: September 22, 1958 (aged 82); New York City, U.S.
- Occupation: Writer
- Relatives: Olive Louise (Roberts) Barton
- Writing career
- Genre: Mystery fiction

Mary Roberts Rinehart (August 12, 1876 – September 22, 1958) was an American writer, often called the American Agatha Christie. Rinehart published her first mystery novel, The Circular Staircase, in 1908, which introduced the "had I but known" narrative style. Rinehart is also considered the earliest known source of the phrase "the butler did it", in her novel The Door (1930), although the exact phrase does not appear in her work and the plot device had been used prior to that time. She also worked to tell the stories and experiences of front line soldiers during World War I, one of the first women to travel to the Belgian front lines.

== Biography ==
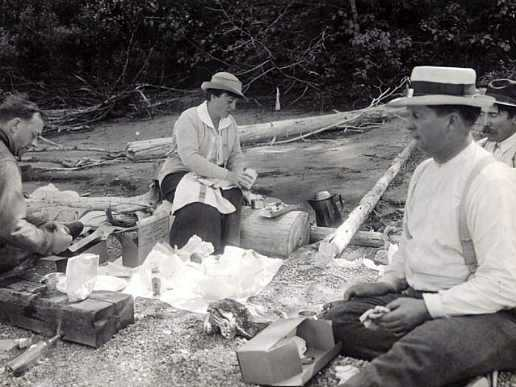
Rinehart lunching after a morning's trouting on Flathead River, Glacier National Park (c. 1921)

Rinehart was born Mary Ella Roberts in Allegheny City, Pennsylvania, now a part of Pittsburgh. A sister, Olive Louise, four years Mary's junior, would later gain recognition as an author of children's books and as a nationally syndicated newspaper columnist. Her father was a frustrated inventor, and throughout her childhood, the family often had financial problems. Her father committed suicide when Mary was 19 years old. Tending to be left-handed at a time when that was considered disadvantageous, she was trained to use her right hand instead.

She attended public schools and graduated at age 16, then enrolled at the Pittsburgh Training School for Nurses at Pittsburgh Homeopathic Hospital, where she graduated in 1897. She described the experience as "all the tragedy of the world under one roof." After graduation, she married Stanley Marshall Rinehart (1867–1932), a physician she had met there. They had three sons: Stanley Jr., Alan, and Frederick.

During the stock market crash of 1903, the couple lost their savings, spurring Rinehart's efforts at writing as a way to earn income. She was 27 that year, and produced 45 short stories. In 1907, she wrote The Circular Staircase, the novel that propelled her to national fame. According to her obituary in the Pittsburgh Post-Gazette in 1958, the book sold 1.25 million copies. Her regular contributions to The Saturday Evening Post were immensely popular and helped the magazine mold American middle-class taste and manners.

In 1911, after the publication of five successful books and two plays, the Rineharts moved to the Pittsburgh suburb of Glen Osborne, where they purchased a large home at the corner of Orchard and Linden Streets called "Cassella." Before they could move into the house, however, Mrs. Rinehart had to have it completely rebuilt because it had fallen into disrepair. "The venture was mine, and I had put every dollar I possessed into the purchase. All week long I wrote wildly to meet the payroll and contractor costs,” she wrote in her autobiography. In 1925, the Rineharts sold the house to the Marks family; the house was demolished in 1969. Today, a Mary Roberts Rinehart Nature Park sits in the borough of Glen Osborne at 1414 Beaver Street, Sewickley, Pennsylvania.

Rinehart's commercial success sometimes conflicted with her expected domestic roles of wife and mother, yet she often pursued adventure, including a job as a war correspondent for The Saturday Evening Post at the Belgian front during World War I. During her time in Belgium, she interviewed Albert I of Belgium, Winston Churchill and Mary of Teck, writing of the latter "This afternoon I am to be presented to the queen of England. I am to curtsey and to say 'Your majesty,' the first time!" Rinehart was working in Europe in 1918 to report on developments to the War Department and was in Paris when the armistice was signed.

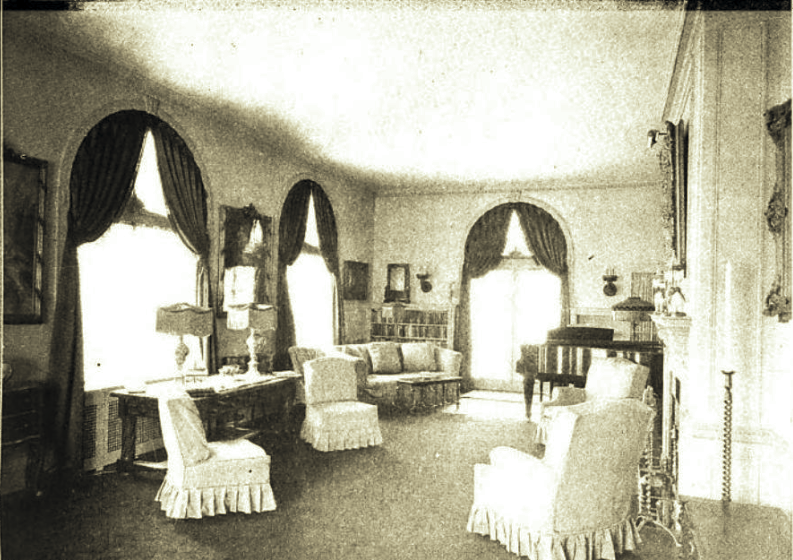
Rinehart home in Washington, D.C. (1927)

In 1922, the family moved to Washington, DC, when Dr. Rinehart was appointed to a post in the Veterans Administration. She was a member of the Literary Society of Washington from 1932 to 1936. Her husband died in 1932, but she continued to live in Washington until 1935, when she moved to New York City. There she helped her sons found the publishing house Farrar & Rinehart, serving as its director.

She also maintained a vacation home in Bar Harbor, Maine. In 1947, a Filipino chef who had worked for her for 25 years fired a gun at her and then attempted to slash her with knives until other servants rescued her. The chef committed suicide in his cell the next day.

Rinehart suffered from breast cancer, which led to a radical mastectomy. She eventually went public with her story, at a time when such matters were not openly discussed. The interview "I Had Cancer" was published in a 1947 issue of the Ladies' Home Journal; in it, Rinehart encouraged women to have breast examinations.

Rinehart received a Mystery Writers of America special award a year after she published her last novel, and an honorary doctorate in literature from George Washington University.

Her correspondence, manuscripts, and personal documents are held in the ULS Archives & Special Collections at the University of Pittsburgh.

The Mary Roberts Rinehart Foundation, established by her sons after her death, underwrites an annual “Mary Roberts Rinehart Award” that is presented to a woman writer of a major nonfiction work.

On November 9, 1956, Rinehart appeared on the interview program Person to Person. She died at age 82 at her apartment at 630 Park Avenue in New York City.

== Writing ==
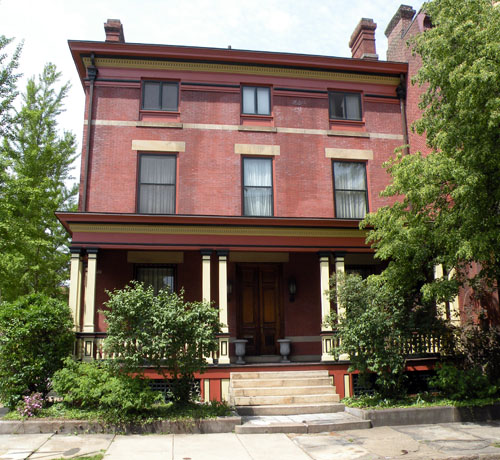
House where Mary Roberts Rinehart lived, and wrote The Circular Staircase at 954 Beech Avenue in the Allegheny West neighborhood of Pittsburgh, Pennsylvania

Rinehart wrote hundreds of short stories, poems, travelogues and articles. Many of her short stories, books, and plays were adapted for movies, such as Bab: A Sub-Deb (1917), The Bat (1926), The Bat Whispers (1930), Miss Pinkerton (1932), and The Bat (1959 remake). The novel The Circular Staircase was first adapted to the screen as a silent film in 1915, and later as an episode in the TV show Climax! in 1956. In 1933 RCA Victor released The Bat as one of the early talking book recordings. She co-wrote the 1920 play The Bat which was later adapted into the 1930 film The Bat Whispers. The latter influenced Bob Kane in the creation of Batman's iconography.

Carole Lombard and Gary Cooper starred in I Take This Woman (1931), an early sound film based on Rinehart's novel Lost Ecstasy (1927).

While many of her books were best sellers, critics were most appreciative of her murder mysteries. Rinehart, in The Circular Staircase (1908), is credited with inventing the "Had-I-but-Known" school of mystery writing. The Had-I-But-Known mystery novel is one where the principal character (frequently female) does things in connection with a crime that have the effect of prolonging the action of the novel. In The Circular Staircase "a middle-aged spinster is persuaded by her niece and nephew to rent a country house for the summer. The gentle, peace-loving trio is plunged into a series of crimes solved with the help of the aunt." Ogden Nash parodied the school in his poem Don't Guess Let Me Tell You: "Sometimes the Had I But Known then what I know now could have saved at least three lives by revealing to the Inspector the conversation I heard through that fortuitous hole in the floor."

The phrase "The butler did it" is often attributed to Rinehart's novel The Door, in which the butler actually did murder someone, although that exact phrase does not appear in the work. The device had been used earlier (for example Herbert Jenkins' 1921 story "The Strange Case of Mr. Challoner") to the point that in 1928 S.S. Van Dine wrote a critique of mystery novels called "Twenty Rules for Writing Detective Stories" in which he argued that it was a poor choice to have a domestic servant be the murderer. Tim Kelly adapted Rinehart's play into a musical, The Butler Did It, Singing. This play includes five lead female roles and five lead male roles.

She followed her initial success with The Man in Lower Ten, another novel that continued to reinforce her fame. After these two, Rinehart published about a book a year. She also wrote a long series of comic stories about Letitia (Tish) Carberry, that was frequented in the Saturday Evening Post over a number of years. This was later made into a series of novels by Rinehart that started with The Amazing Adventures of Letitia Carberry in 1911.

After her fiction writing era, Rinehart worked as a correspondent during World War I. She became "obsessed by the injustice, the wanton waste and cost" of the war, and wrote extensively of the things she had seen in 10 articles for the Saturday Evening Post, which were later republished in the London Times. During this time, her interviewees included Albert I of Belgium, Winston Churchill, French General Ferdinand Foch, and Mary of Teck. She sent the notes from her interview with Albert I to President Wilson in the hopes of swaying him from neutrality to fighting alongside the Belgians. Her articles were later published as a collection titled "Kings, Queens and Pawns" in 1915.

Afterwards, she continued to write many novels and also began writing plays. She wrote an autobiography, My Story, in 1931, which later was revised in 1948. During her prime, she was said to be even more famous than her rival, Agatha Christie. At the time of Rinehart's death, her books had sold over 10 million copies.

== Works ==
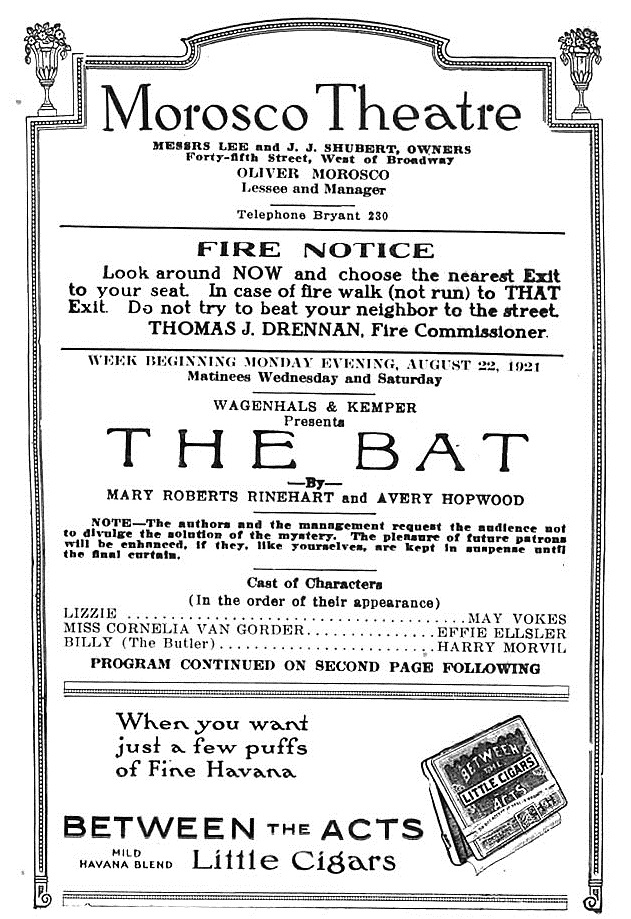
Program for the 1920 play The Bat

=== Novels ===
- The Circular Staircase (1908) Adapted (with Avery Hopwood) for the stage as The Bat
- The Man in Lower Ten (1909)
- The Window at the White Cat (1910) Revision of The Mystery of 1122
- When A Man Marries, or Seven Days (1910) Expansion of Rinehart's 1908 novella Seven Days
- Where There's a Will (1912)
- The Case of Jennie Brice (1913)
- The Street of Seven Stars (1914)
- The After House: A Story of Love, Mystery and a Private Yacht (1914)
- K. (1915)
- Bab, a Sub-Deb (1916)
- Long Live the King! (1917)
- The Amazing Interlude (1918)
- Twenty-Three and a Half Hours' Leave (1918)
- Dangerous Days (1919)
- A Poor Wise Man (1920)
- The Truce of God (1920)
- Sight Unseen (1921)
- The Confession (1921)
- The Breaking Point (1922)
- The Red Lamp (1925) Alternate title The Mystery Lamp
- The Bat (1926) Novelization of play, credited to Rinehart and Hopwood, but ghostwritten by Stephen Vincent Benét
- Lost Ecstasy (1927) Alternate title I Take This Woman
- This Strange Adventure (1928)
- Two Flights Up (1928)
- The Door (1930)
- The Double Alibi (1932)
- The Album (1933)
- The State vs. Elinor Norton (1933)
- The Doctor (1936)
- The Wall (1938)
- The Great Mistake (1940)
- The Haunted Lady (1942)
- The Yellow Room (1945)
- A Light in the Window (1948)
- The Swimming Pool (1952)

=== Letitia (Tish) Carberry ===
- The Amazing Adventures of Letitia Carberry (1911)
- Tish: The Chronicle of Her Escapades and Excursions (1916)
- More Tish (1921)
- Tish Plays the Game (1926)
- Tish Marches On (1937)

=== Hilda Adams ===
- The Buckled Bag (1914)
- Miss Pinkerton (1932) Alternate title The Double Alibi
- The Haunted Lady (1942) Sequel to Miss Pinkerton
- Episode of the Wandering Knife (1950)

=== Short story collections ===
- Love Stories (1919)
- Affinities and Other Stories (1920)
- Temperamental People (1924)
- The Romantics (1929)
- Married People (1937)
- Familiar Faces: Stories of People You Know (1941)
- Alibi for Isabel and Other Stories (1944)
- The Frightened Wife and Other Murder Stories (1953) Special Edgar Award, 1954

=== Plays ===
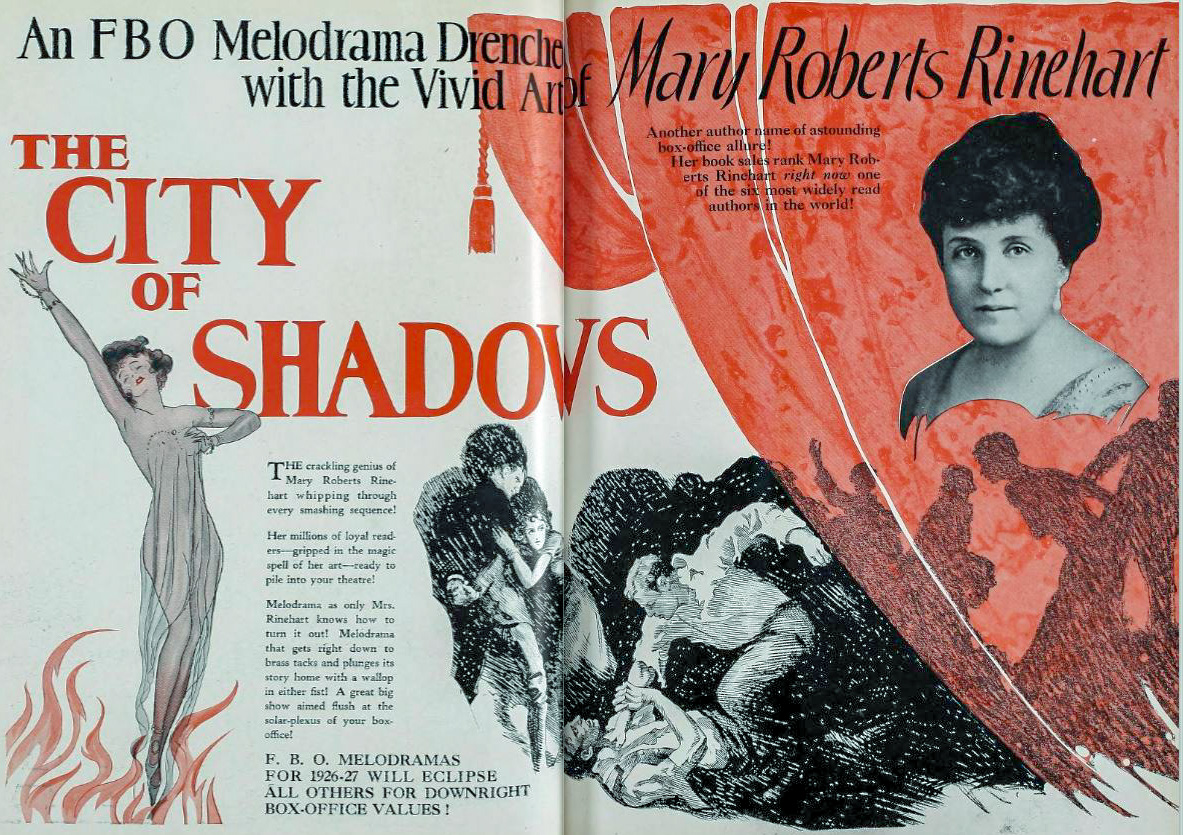
Advertisement for the film "City of Shadows" (1927)

- The Double Life (1906)
- Seven Days (1909) (with Avery Hopwood)
- Cheer Up (1912) Produced and directed by Cecil B. DeMille
- Tumble In (1919) (with Avery Hopwood) Musical version of Seven Days
- The Bat (1920) (with Avery Hopwood)
- Spanish Love (1920) (with Avery Hopwood)
- The Breaking Point (1923)

=== Nonfiction ===
- "Faces and Brains," Photoplay, February 1922, p. 47.
- Kings, Queens, and Pawns: An American Woman at the Front (1915) A collection of Rinehart's reports as a correspondent during World War I
- Through Glacier Park: Seeing America First with Howard Eaton (1916)
- The Altar of Freedom: An Appeal to the Mothers of America (1917) An appeal to prepare for the coming war
- Tenting Tonight: A Chronicle of Sport and Adventure in Glacier Park and the Cascade Mountains (1918) First published in Cosmopolitan (1917)
- The Out Trail (1923)
- Nomad's Land (1926)
- My Story (1931; revised 1948) Rinehart's autobiography

=== Essays ===
- "Isn't That Just Like a Man!" (1920) Available in one volume with "Oh, Well, You Know How Women Are!" by Irvin S. Cobb
- "Why I Believe in Scouting for Girls"

== Film and TV adaptations ==
- 1914 – Jane;– short film
- 1914 – At the Foot of the Hill;– short film
- 1915 – The Cave on Thunder Cloud;– short film
- 1915 – Mind Over Motor;– short film
- 1915 – Tish's Spy;– short film
- 1915 – The Circular Staircase (novel The Circular Staircase)
- 1915 – Affinities;– short film
- 1915 – The Papered Door;– short film
- 1915 – What Happened to Father? (story)
- 1916 – Acquitted (story)
- 1917 – Bab's Diary (story)
- 1917 – Bab's Burglar (story)
- 1917 – Bab's Matinee Idol (story)
- 1918 – The Doctor and the Woman (novel K.)
- 1918 – The Street of Seven Stars (novel)
- 1918 – Her Country First (story "The G.A.C.")
- 1919 – 23 1/2 Hours' Leave (story)
- 1920 – Dangerous Days (novel) / (titles)
- 1920 – It's a Great Life (story "Empire Builders");- film
- 1922 – Affinities (story)
- 1922 – The Glorious Fool (stories "In the Pavillion" and "Twenty-Two")
- 1923 – Mind Over Motor (story)
- 1923 – Long Live the King (book)
- 1924 – The Breaking Point (novel)
- 1924 – The Silent Watcher (story "The Altar on the Hill")
- 1924 – Her Love Story (story "Her Majesty, the Queen")
- 1924 – K — The Unknown (novel K.)
- 1925 – Seven Days (play co-written with Avery Hopwood)
- 1926 – The Bat (play The Bat)
- 1927 – City of Shadows (story)
- 1927 – What Happened to Father? (story)
- 1927 – Aflame in the Sky (story)
- 1928 – Finders Keepers (story "Make Them Happy")
- 1930 – The Bat Whispers (based upon play The Bat)
- 1931 – I Take This Woman (novel Lost Ecstasy)
- 1932 – Miss Pinkerton (novel)
- 1934 – Elinor Norton (novel The State vs. Elinor Norton)
- 1935 – Mr. Cohen Takes a Walk (novel)
- 1937 – 23½ Hours Leave (story)
- 1941 – The Dog in the Orchard (story) – short film
- 1941 – The Nurse's Secret (novel Miss Pinkerton)
- 1942 – Tish (stories)
- 1952 – Robert Montgomery Presents (TV series) (novel The Wall)
- 1953 – Your Favorite Story (TV series) (story "Strange Journey")
- 1953 – Broadway Television Theatre (TV series) – The Bat
- 1954 – Ford Television Theatre (TV series) – The Haunted Room (June 3, 1954)
- 1956 – Star Stage (TV series) (story "I Am Her Nurse")
- 1954–56 – Ford Television Theatre (TV series) – The Unlocked Door (1954) original story/Autumn Fever (1956)
- 1954–56 – Climax! (TV series) – The After House (1954)/The Circular Staircase (1956)
- 1957 - Telephone Time (TV series) - Novel Appeal. Claudette Colbert portrayed Rinehart in the story of the genesis of the novel The After House.
- 1959 – The Bat (play The Bat) with Agnes Moorehead and Vincent Price
- 1960 – Dow Hour of Great Mysteries (TV series) – The Bat
- 1978 – Der Spinnenmörder (TV film) based on The Bat

== See also ==
- Detective fiction
- List of female detective characters
- List of female detective/mystery writers
- List of mystery writers
