= Getting Gertie's Garter =

Getting Gertie's Garter may refer to:

- Getting Gertie's Garter (1945 film), an American slapstick comedy film based on the play
- Getting Gertie's Garter (1927 film), an American silent comedy film based on the play
- Getting Gertie's Garter (play), a play written by Wilson Collison and Avery Hopwood
