= The Model Husband =

The Model Husband (German:Der Mustergatte) may refer to:

- The Model Husband (1937 film), a German film
- The Model Husband (1956 film), a West German film
- The Model Husband (1959 film), a Swiss film
