= Den grønne heisen =

- Directed by: Odd-Geir Sæther
- Based on: Fair and Warmer, a 1915 play by Avery Hopwood
- Starring: Rolv Wesenlund; Marie Louise Tank; Øivind Blunck; Elsa Lystad; Anders Hatlo; Brit Elisabeth Haagensli
- Release date: 1981
- Running time: 93 minutes
- Country: Norway
- Language: Norwegian

Den grønne heisen (English: The green elevator) is a 1981 Norwegian comedy film directed by Odd-Geir Sæther, based on the 1915 play Fair and Warmer by Avery Hopwood, and starring Rolv Wesenlund and Øivind Blunck.

== Plot ==
Preben invites Mrs. Lissen to the opera, and later she says she wants a divorce from Fredrik. It develops into a hide-and-seek hunt for the truth.

== Cast ==
- Rolv Wesenlund as Fredrik Borkmann
- Marie Louise Tank as Lissen Borkmann
- Øivind Blunck as Einar Lorck Mathiesen
- Elsa Lystad as Topsy Lorck Mathiesen
- Anders Hatlo as Preben Bang
- Brit Elisabeth Haagensli as Dagny
