= Getting Gertie's Garter (1945 film) =

1945 film by Allan Dwan

- Directed by: Allan Dwan
- Written by: Allan Dwan; Karen DeWolf; Joe Bigelow (additional dialogue)
- Based on: Getting Gertie's Garter by Wilson Collison and Avery Hopwood
- Produced by: Edward Small
- Starring: Dennis O'Keefe; Marie McDonald; Barry Sullivan
- Cinematography: Charles Lawton Jr.
- Edited by: Walter Hannemann; Truman K. Wood; Grant Whytock
- Music by: Hugo Friedhofer (uncredited)
- Production company: Edward Small Productions
- Distributed by: United Artists
- Release date: November 30, 1945
- Running time: 72 minutes
- Country: United States
- Language: English

Getting Gertie's Garter is a 1945 American slapstick comedy film written and directed by Allan Dwan, and starring Dennis O'Keefe, Marie McDonald, and Barry Sullivan. The film is based on the 1921 play of the same name by Wilson Collison and Avery Hopwood. The play was previously adapted for the screen as a silent film released in 1927 by Metropolitan Pictures and starred Marie Prevost and Charles Ray.

== Plot ==
Dr. Kenneth B. Ford (Dennis O'Keefe) is researching a revolutionary new anesthetic at Boston Mass Hospital. He receives news that he is about to be awarded by being elected into the Society of Scientific Research and is overjoyed. His joy is lessened however, by the arrival of district attorney investigator Winters (Frank Fenton), and the news that he is investigating a big jewel theft. Winters wants to question Kenneth about a piece of jewelry he bought two years earlier, but Kenneth says he doesn't recall anything of the sort. Winters suspects Kenneth of not telling the whole truth, and calls him to testify in court the next day.

Right after Winter leaves, Kenneth calls his former girlfriend Gertie Kettering (Marie McDonald), an artist, and enquires about the jeweled garter she got from him two years earlier. It had an inscription on it: "To Gertie from Ken, with all my love". Kenneth is now happily married to Patty (Sheila Ryan), and doesn't want his gift to Gertie to be known to his wife, which would cause a scandal on his behalf. Kenneth wants Gertie to give back the garter to him. Gertie tells him his request is impossible, since she is about to wear the garter at her wedding the following day, and she has already sent it to Ipswich where the wedding is taking place.

Patty is waiting for Kenneth at the laboratory when he gets back to perform his research experiment. Patty understands from Kenneth's behavior that something is wrong. She gets jealous of Gertie and follows Kenneth when he goes to Ipswich that night, to visit his best friend Ted Dalton (Barry Sullivan), who is marrying Gertie. When Kenneth and Ted talk about the garter, Gertie eavesdrops on them and comes to believe that Ted would disapprove of the fact that she has accepted a gift from another man. Gertie demands that Kenneth tells Ted the truth, and she decides to keep the garter in case she needs to prove her innocence. Kenneth refuses, determined to keep the garter a secret from his wife. Instead he plans to take the garter back.

Patty sees the discussion between Kenneth and Gertie, and gets more jealous. When she falls into a water barrel, Gertie's brother-in-law Billy (Jerome Cowan) helps her with dry clothes, and his wife Barbara (Binnie Barnes) becomes jealous of them when she sees them in the barn. The butler has gotten hold of the garter and wants to use it to blackmail Kenneth. Eventually Ted sees Kenneth and Gertie together, and later Kenneth finds Patty with no clothes in the barn, and Barbara discovers Billy covered only in hay. In vain, Kenneth and Gertie try to explain about the jewelry theft investigation. Everyone is jealous of everyone else, and no one trusts their respective partners anymore. Then the butler appears with the garter, and everyone believes Kenneth and Gertie. Everyone makes up with their partner and all is well.

== Cast ==
- Dennis O'Keefe as Dr. Kenneth B. Ford
- Marie McDonald as Gertie Kettering
- Barry Sullivan as Ted Dalton
- Binnie Barnes as Barbara
- J. Carrol Naish as Charles, the butler
- Sheila Ryan as Patty Ford
- Jerome Cowan as Billy
- Frank Fenton as Winters

== Production notes ==
Filming was due to begin March 22, 1945. However, this was postponed due to a labor strike in Hollywood at the time.
