= Ione Bright =

American theatre actress (1887–1976)

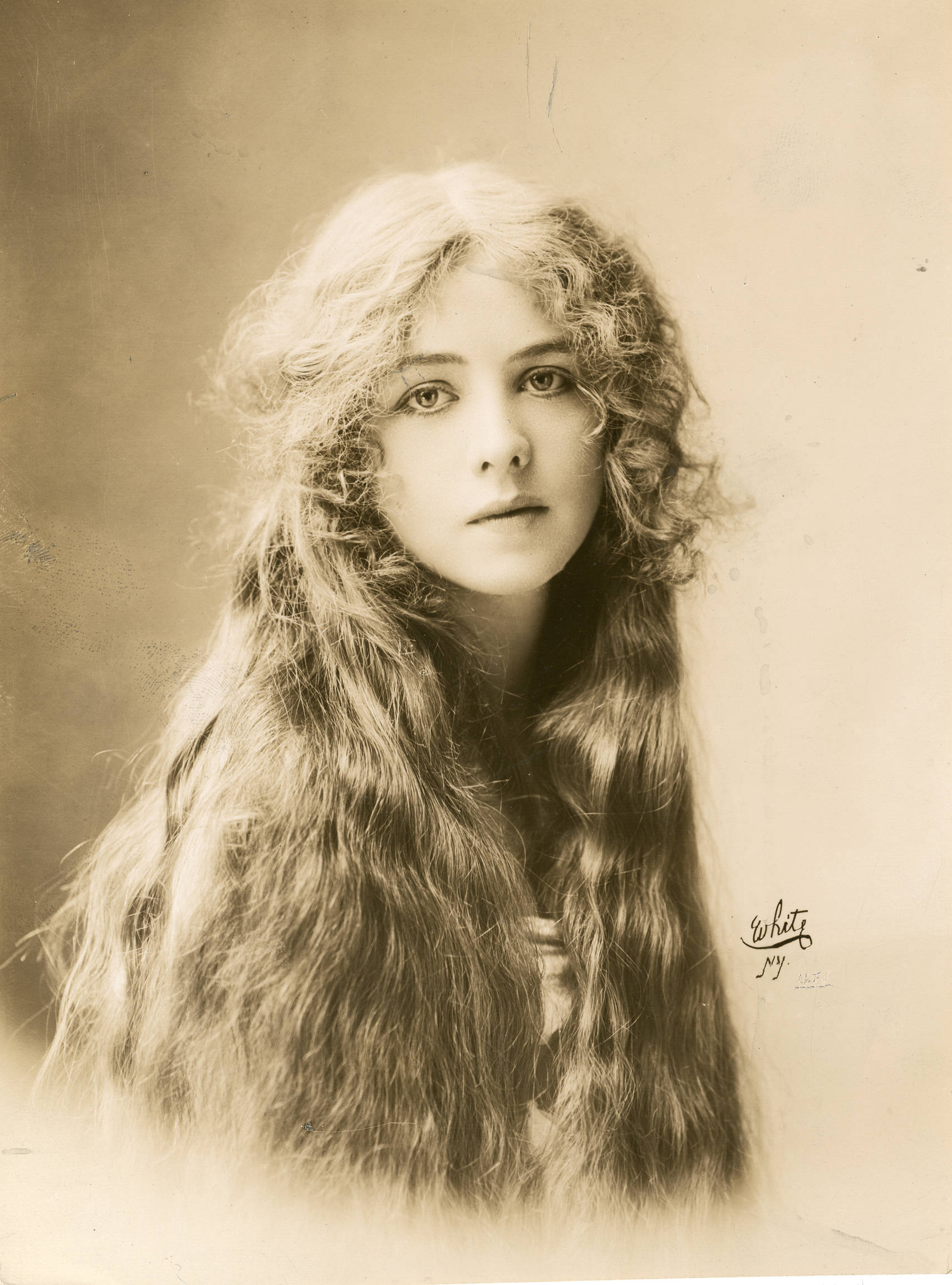
- Born: May 11, 1887; Angels Camp, Calaveras, California U.S.
- Died: August 17, 1976 (aged 89); Whittier, California, U.S.
- Occupation: Actress
- Years active: 1908–1957?

Ione Bright (May 11, 1887 – August 17, 1976) was an American theatre actress active in Broadway and other theatre from 1908 to the early 1950s.

== Early life ==
Ione E. Bright was born on May 11, 1887, in Angels Camp, Calaveras County, California. She was the youngest child of Simon Edward Bright and Mary (Clark) Bright. Her three siblings were Agnes (born 1878), Claude (born 1885), and Bernard (born 1882). According to a later newspaper interview, she grew up "among the great trees right at the entrance of the Yosemite Valley".

Her father died sometime between 1896 and 1900, and in 1900 she was living in Jerome, Arizona Territory with her mother, who was working as a chambermaid. In 1903 she was placed at the Convent of the Presentation, a convent and all-girls school, in San Francisco, California. After the 1906 San Francisco earthquake and fire she was sent to act as a secretary for her brother-in-law, but "put the books in such condition that a new set was started".

While attending school at the Convent of the Presentation in San Francisco, she was cast as Saint Joan in a school production of The Maid of Orleans by Friedrich Schiller.

=== Early career ===
After graduating from the Convent of the Presentation school Bright decided to pursue a stage career, in part because "it seemed to me the best paying profession that a woman could enter...because it pays better than book-keeping, stenography, selling ribbons, or delivering ice cream sodas to after-theater parties". When asked how she knew she had the talent, her reply was "I didn't; I just took a chance".

Bright approached Nance O'Neil's management at the Liberty Playhouse in Oakland, California for work and was cast as a "super" at $5 per week. She progressed to speaking roles and toured in various stock productions throughout California, living in San Francisco. During one such production she was spotted by the manager of Brewster's Millions, who offered her a role in the production. In this role she toured Seattle and other Western cities.

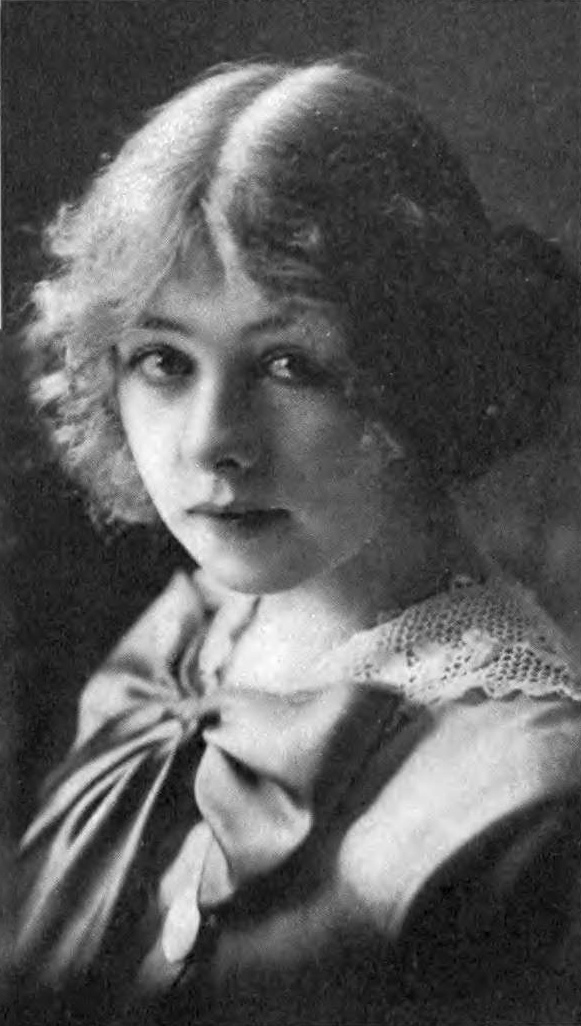
Ione Bright in Theatre Magazine, August 1912.

A potential role with Henry W. Savage beckoned on the East Coast, so in April 1910 Ione Bright moved to New York. The role in the Broadway production of Sewell Collins' Miss Patsy was short-lived, but Bright was soon cast by the Cohan & Harris Company in various Cohan productions such as Get-Rich-Quick Wallingford. She also participated in touring productions and received favorable notices for her performances.

At some point between April 1910 and April 1911, Bright entered a beauty contest and took first place, earning a cash prize of $1000 (approx. $27,600 in 2021). In April 1911, Bright was photographed by Rudolf Eickemeyer Jr. and her photograph entered in a national competition of over 3700 photographs of the most beautiful women in America. She was judged most beautiful and the photograph was awarded a gold medal by the American Photographers Association.

In 1912 Bright was cast in the Cohan production of Officer 666, participating in the New York production and then touring. The production played in Chicago, then toured the west coast of the United States in fall of 1912. The production went to Canada and through the midwestern and southern United States. The company was present in Dayton, Ohio for the Great Dayton Flood.

After Officer 666, she was cast in The Lady of the Slipper and A Pair of Sixes. Both plays toured following their New York runs. She was then in Julian Eltinge's production of Cousin Lucy in 1915.

=== Foray into film ===
In early 1916 Ione Bright was contracted by Mirror Films Inc. to be in their film productions. Mirror soon experienced financial difficulties, resulting in legal actions and departures of actors and production crew. She may have been a cast member in the films The Marriage Bond and/or Turned Up (lost films) for Mirror. Bright also was in the 1917 comedy short Mixed Nuts, produced by Jaxon Film Productions as part of the Sparkle Comedies, and may have had small parts in or tested for Pathé productions.

=== Later career ===
In 1917-1918 Ione Bright was in the original production of Nothing But the Truth, which ran for 332 performances in New York and then toured. This was followed by other productions in 1919 and 1920. In August 1920 she portrayed Fuensantica in Spanish Love, which ran for 312 performances on Broadway. This was followed by Suspended Sentence in 1922–23, with Bright taking over from actress Phyllis Alden and then staying with the production through a brief tour ending in New York.

During the summer of 1923, Bright was a member of the Wood Players, a stock company founded by Leonard Wood, Jr. She participated a half-dozen productions during the company's residence in Lancaster, Pennsylvania at the Fulton Opera House.

In late 1925/early 1926, she was a cast member of the vaudeville farce Now What?, starring Wilfred Clarke at the Bushwick Theatre.

In 1936, Ione Bright was cast as First Lady of Canterbury in the WPA Federal Theatre Project production of T.S. Eliot's Murder in the Cathedral at the Manhattan Theatre (now the Ed Sullivan Theatre) in New York. The play was an unexpected success, receiving good notices and playing to over 40,000 people in 38 performances. This was followed by a role in Help Yourself the same year and then a role the following year in the WPA production of A Hero Is Born.

== Later years ==
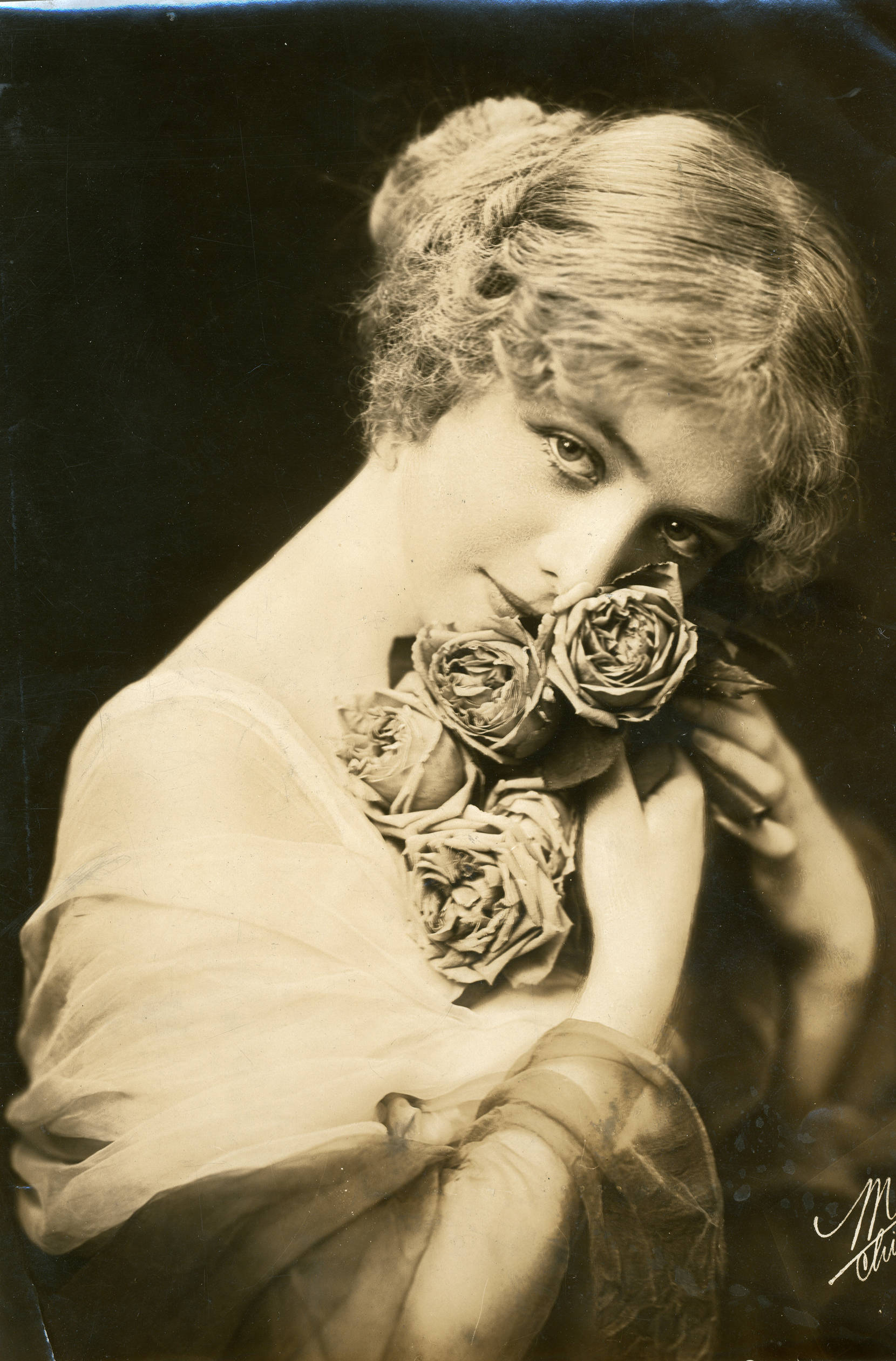
Ione Bright, 1915.

In 1930, Ione Bright was listed as living in a boarding house on the Upper West Side of Manhattan. In 1940, she was listed as sharing an apartment with Wilfred Clarke on West 55th Street in Manhattan.

Sometime after 1957, Bright moved to Whittier, California.

== Death ==
Ione Bright died on August 17, 1976, in Whittier, California at the age of 89.

== Stage credits ==
- Quo Vadis (supernumerary, first role)
- The Fires of St. John (stock)
- Marie Antoinette (stock)
- Mrs. Temple's Telegram (stock)
- The Sorceress (1908, as Zaquir, a young boy in Soraya's service; with Nance O'Neil)
- Right's Might (1909, Frank McGlynn Sr./Jack Gleason stock production)
- Brewster's Millions (1910, as Margaret Grey, touring company)
- House of a Thousand Candles (1910, as Gladys Armstrong; part of Columbia Stock Company)
- Miss Patsy (1910, as Pansy Hoffman)
- Get-Rich-Quick Wallingford (1911)
- Officer 666 (1912, as Helen Burton, toured US and Canada)
- The Lady of the Slipper (1913, as the Fairy Godmother, touring)
- A Pair of Sixes (1914, as Florence Cole, touring)
- The Unexpected (1915)
- Cousin Lucy (1915, Julian Eltinge production)
- The Lucky Fellow (1916)
- Nothing But the Truth (1916, as Ethel Clark; 332 Broadway performances, then touring)
- Nothing But Lies (1918)
- I Love You (1919, as Ruth Franklin)
- Nightie-Night (1919)
- Every Little Thing (1920, as Kitty Dean; William Powell in cast as William H. Powell)
- Spanish Love (1920, as Fuensantica, 312 performances; William Powell Broadway major role debut)
- Suspended Sentence (1922, as Mary; took over role from Phyllis Alden in Wilmington, Delaware Dec 25, 1922)
- Pollyanna (1923, as part of the Wood Players stock company in Lancaster, PA; Spencer Tracy part of company)
- A Pair of Silk Stockings (1923, Wood Players)
- Seventeen (1923, as Lola Pratt; Wood Players)
- Buddies (1923, as Julie; Wood Players)
- Why Men Leave Home (1923, Wood Players)
- Up The Ladder (1923, Wood Players)
- Now What? (1925)
- Murder in the Cathedral (1936, as First Lady of Canterbury; WPA Federal Theatre production)
- Help Yourself (1936, WPA Federal Theatre production)
- A Hero Is Born (1937, as The Armored Fairy, Ladies and Gentlemen and Servants of the Court, Gossiping Guest; WPA Federal Theatre production)
