= Betty Callish =

Dutch-born actress, singer and violinist

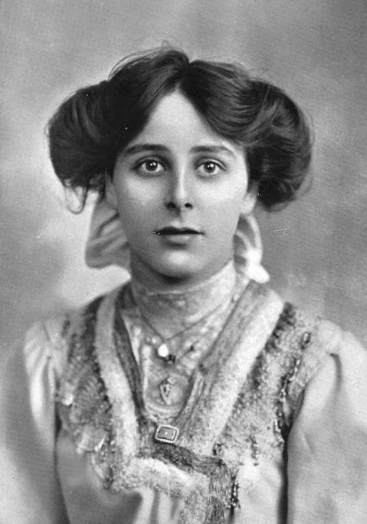
- Betty Callish, from a 1906 publication.
- Born: August 24, 1886; Baarn, Holland
- Died: after 1941
- Other names: Roxo Betty Weingartner, Betty Calisch, Betty Kalisch, Babette Callish
- Occupation(s): actress, singer, violinist
- Years active: 1905-1920
- Spouse: Felix Weingartner (married 1922, divorced by 1931)

Betty Callish (August 24, 1886 – after 1941) was a Dutch-born actress, singer, and violinist who performed in Dutch, English, German, French and Italian. In 1941, as Roxo Betty Weingartner, she became a postulant of the Third Order Regular CSMV, a cloistered religious community at the Convent of St Thomas the Martyr in Oxford.

== Early life ==
Babette Calisch was born in Baarn, the daughter of Salomon Oreste Calisch and Aleida Oppenheim. Her parents were Jewish; her mother was a first cousin to Dutch feminist Aletta Jacobs. She knew Sarah Bernhardt from childhood, and on her advice studied acting, learned to play the violin, and trained as a singer in Berlin.

== Career ==
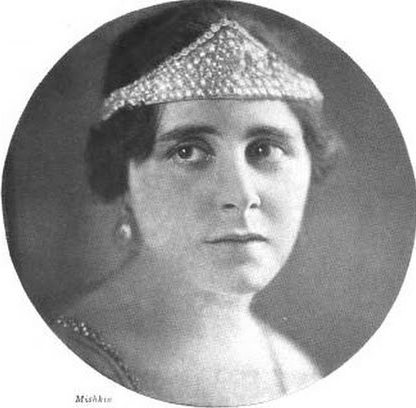
Betty Callish, from a 1918 publication.

She started acting in London, as a student at Herbert Beerbohm Tree's academy, now known as the Royal Academy of Dramatic Art. In England, Callish appeared Lady Ben (1905), Leah Kleschna (1905), The Little Stranger (1906), A Waltz Dream (1911) and Orpheus in the Underground (1912). She was also seen in London productions of The Laughing Husband and Sadie Love; she appeared in both these shows on Broadway, as well, in 1914 and 1915. She starred in The Great Lover (1916) in Chicago. and in The King (1917-1918). "She is a pretty soubrette," commented American critic Burns Mantle, "who both sings and plays violin – pleasantly but neither with surpassing skill."

In 1941, after a divorce and a time in treatment for alcoholism, Betty Weingartner became a postulant at the Third Order Regular CSMV, a cloistered religious community at the Convent of St Thomas the Martyr in Oxford. There, she was known as "Marica".

== Personal life ==
Betty Callish married (in 1922) and divorced (by 1931) Austrian conductor Felix Weingartner; she was his fourth wife. He dedicated a symphony to her during their marriage. She was a confidante of Queen Marie of Romania. She died after 1941.
