= Spanish Love =

Play by Avery Hopwood and Mary Roberts Rinehart

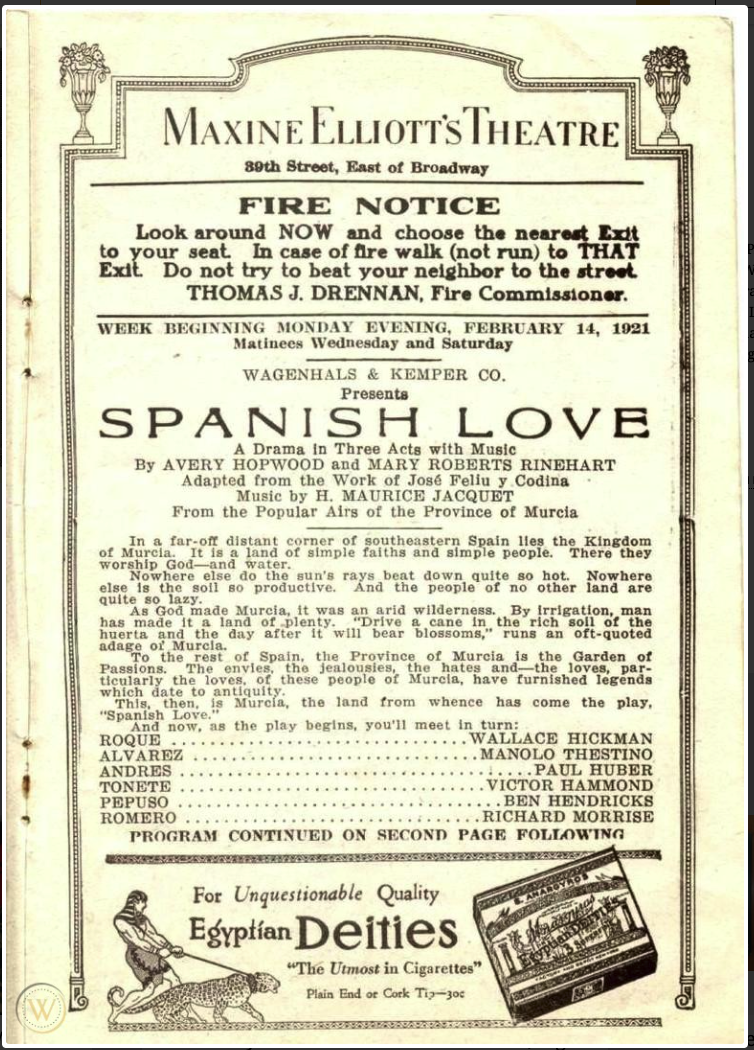
- Original language: English
- Written by: Avery Hopwood; Mary Roberts Rinehart
- Based on: Maria del Carmen by Josep Feliu i Codina

Premiere
- Date: August 17, 1920
- Place: Maxine Elliott Theatre

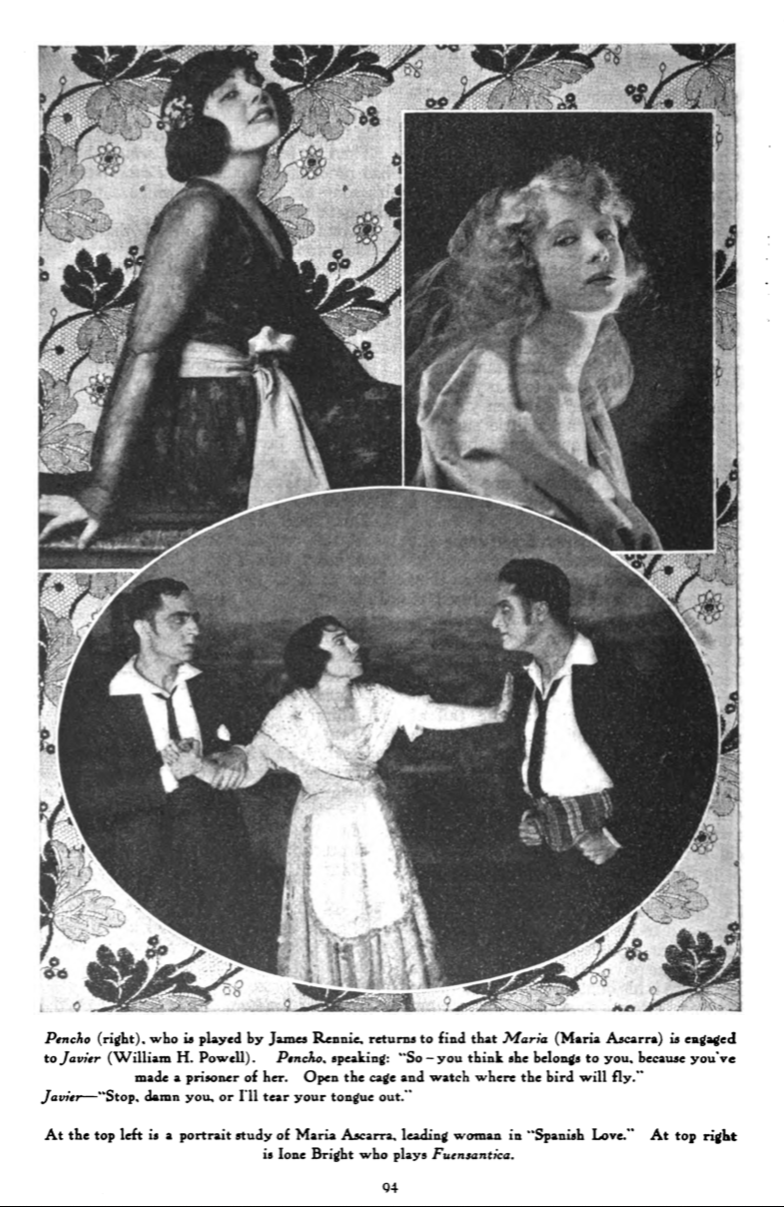
Cast of Spanish Love. William Powell on left in lower image.

Spanish Love is a three-act play by Avery Hopwood and Mary Roberts Rinehart, who adapted an earlier Spanish play, María del Carmen by Josep Feliu i Codina. Producers Lincoln Wagenhals and Collin Kemper staged it at the Maxine Elliott Theatre on Broadway, where it opened on August 17, 1920. Although critics had reservations about the play, the production was a success, running for over 300 performances. However, the play's success was overshadowed by the tremendous popularity of The Bat, another collaboration between Hopwood and Rinehart that opened on Broadway the following week.

The story focuses on Javier and Pencho, two young Spanish men who are contending for the love of Maria del Carmen. Pencho is arrested after he injures Javier in a fight. Maria agrees to marry Javier to stop the prosecution of Pencho, but Javier dies before the wedding.

Production Cast
| Character | Cast |
|---|---|
| Rogue | Wallace Hickman |
| Alvarez | Manola Thestino |
| Andres | Paul Huber |
| Tenete | Victor Hammond |
| Pepuso | Ben Hendricks |
| Anton | Frank Peters |
| Don Fulgencio | Russ Whytal |
| Maria del Carmen | Maria Ascarra |
| Fuensantica | Ione Bright |
| Concepcion | Kenyon Bishop |
| Migale | Gus C. Weinburg |
| Domingo | Henry Stephenson |
| Javier | William Powell (as William H. Powell) (Note: This was William Powell's first major Broadway role.) |
| Pencho | James Rennie |
| A Singer | Ofelia Calvo |
| A Singer | Jasper Mangione |

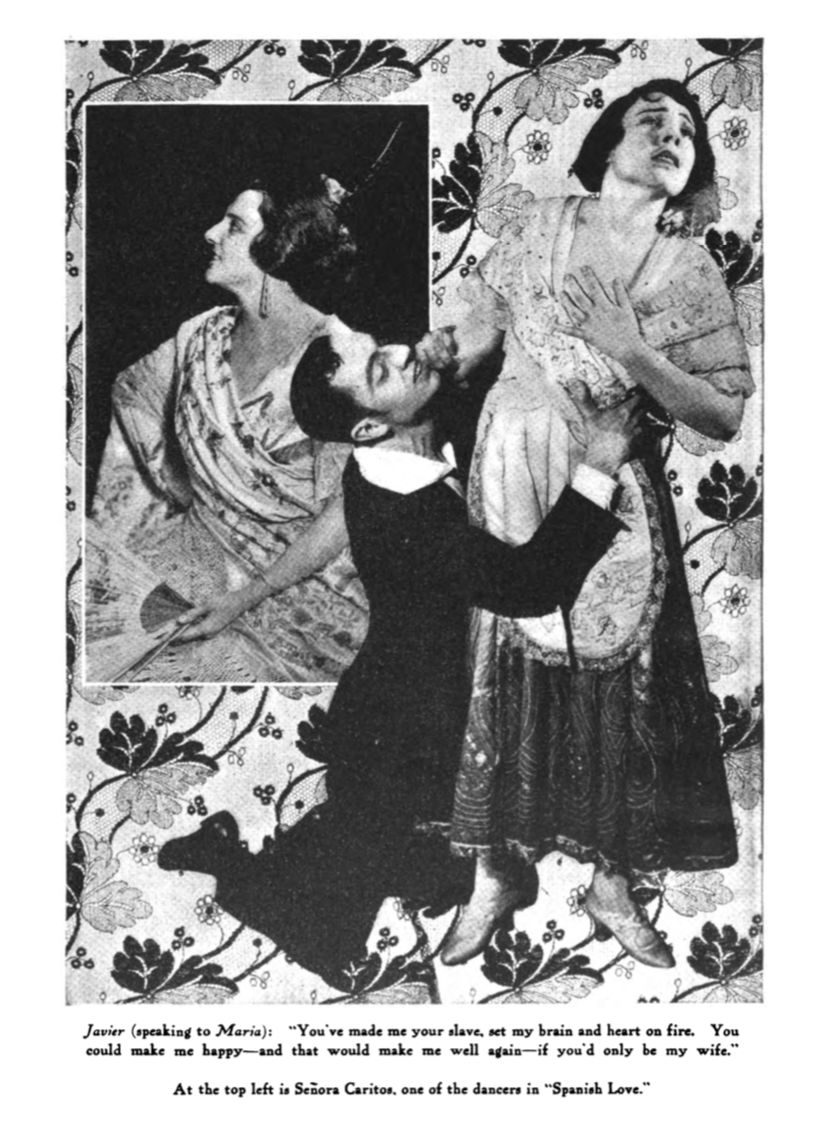
Cast of Spanish Love
