= Sadie Love (play) =

1915 theatrical farce

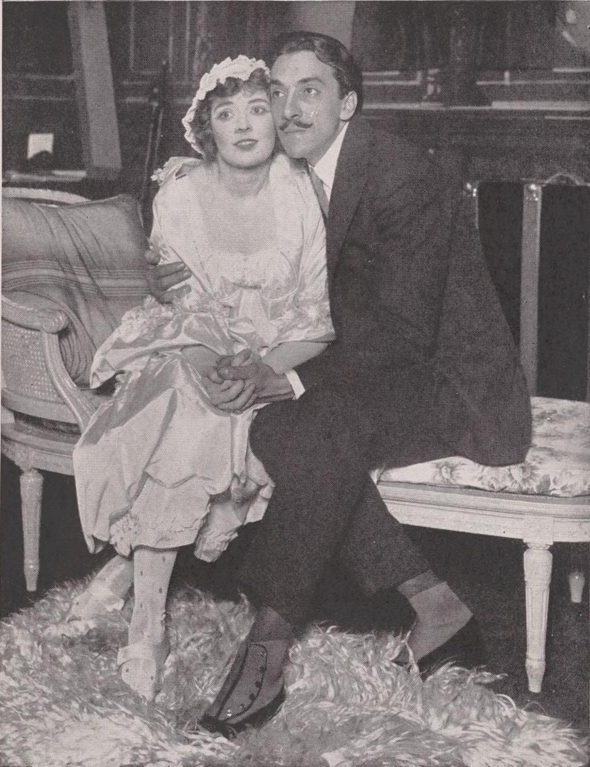
- Marjorie Rambeau and Pedro de Cordoba as Sadie Love and Prince Luigi
- Written by: Avery Hopwood
- Original language: English
- Genre: Farce

Premiere
- Date premiered: November 29, 1915
- Place premiered: Gaiety Theatre, New York

Sadie Love is a three-act play written by Avery Hopwood. Producer Oliver Morosco staged it on Broadway, where it opened at the Gaiety Theatre in November 1915. The play is a farce about a widow named Sadie Love, who marries a prince but discovers he still has feelings for a previous girlfriend. The play was adapted as a movie of the same name in 1919.

== Plot ==
Sadie Love, a young widow, marries an Italian prince. When the prince's previous girlfriend, the Comtesse de Mirabole, tries to lure him back, Sadie realizes the prince still has romantic feelings for the comtesse. Sadie wants a divorce, but to avoid public embarrassment, she insists that they go on their honeymoon first. The comtesse wants to go along to prevent the newlyweds from consummating their marriage. Sadie agrees, but only if she can bring her own ex-boyfriend, Jim Wakeley. Jim is followed by his wife, Lilian, who brings her own romantic interest, Mumford Crewe. The six travel first to the home of Sadie's aunt, Mrs. Warrington, who disapproves of the group's romantic complications, then to the cruise ship the prince has booked for the honeymoon.

== Cast and characters ==
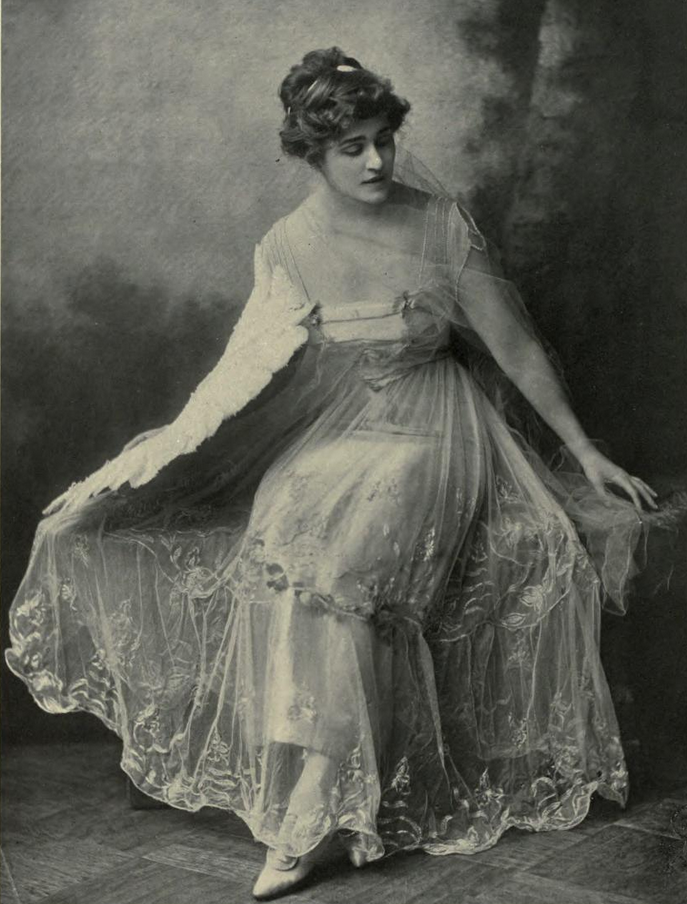
Ivy Troutman as Lilian Wakeley

The characters and cast from the Broadway production are given below:

Opening night cast
Character	Broadway cast
Sadie Love	Marjorie Rambeau
Prince Luigi Pallavicini	Pedro de Cordoba
Comtesse de Mirabole	Betty Callish
Jim Wakeley	Franklyn Underwood
Lilian Wakeley	Ivy Troutman
Mrs. Warrington	Ethel Winthrop
Mumford Crewe	Cecil Yapp
Detective	William Morris
Edward	John Lyons
Steward	John Ivan

== History ==
In 1913, playwright Avery Hopwood wrote a play titled Miss Jenny O'Jones. Producer William A. Brady considered it as a possible project for his wife, actress Grace George, but after an unsuccessful three-day tryout in Springfield, Massachusetts, Brady decided not to go forward. Hopwood then rewrote the story as a novelette. He submitted it to The Smart Set, where it was published in the September 1915 issue under the title "A Full Honeymoon". The John Lane Company subsequently published it as a novel under the title Sadie Love, and Hopwood adapted it back into a play under that title. Producer Oliver Morosco staged a preview production at the Burbank Theatre in Burbank, California, where it opened on September 5, 1915. Hopwood used the four-week run to update the play, including a thorough rewrite of the final act.

Morosco took the revised play to the Gaiety Theatre on Broadway, where it opened on November 29, 1915. On January 17, 1916, the production was moved from the Gaiety to the Harris Theatre, where it closed on February 5 after 80 performances.

== Dramatic analysis ==
Like many of Hopwood's comedies, Sadie Love derives much of its humor from indicating that the characters want to engage in illicit sex, but thwarting them before they can follow through. For example, when Sadie says that she wants to guarantee her divorce by committing adultery with Jim, her disapproving aunt blocks this plan by locking their rooms. This type of humor was key to the play's appeal to audiences, but created controversy among critics for defying the conservative sexual mores of the time.

== Adaptations ==
John S. Robertson directed a 1919 silent movie of the same name with Billie Burke starring as Sadie. This film is considered lost.
