= Why Men Leave Home =

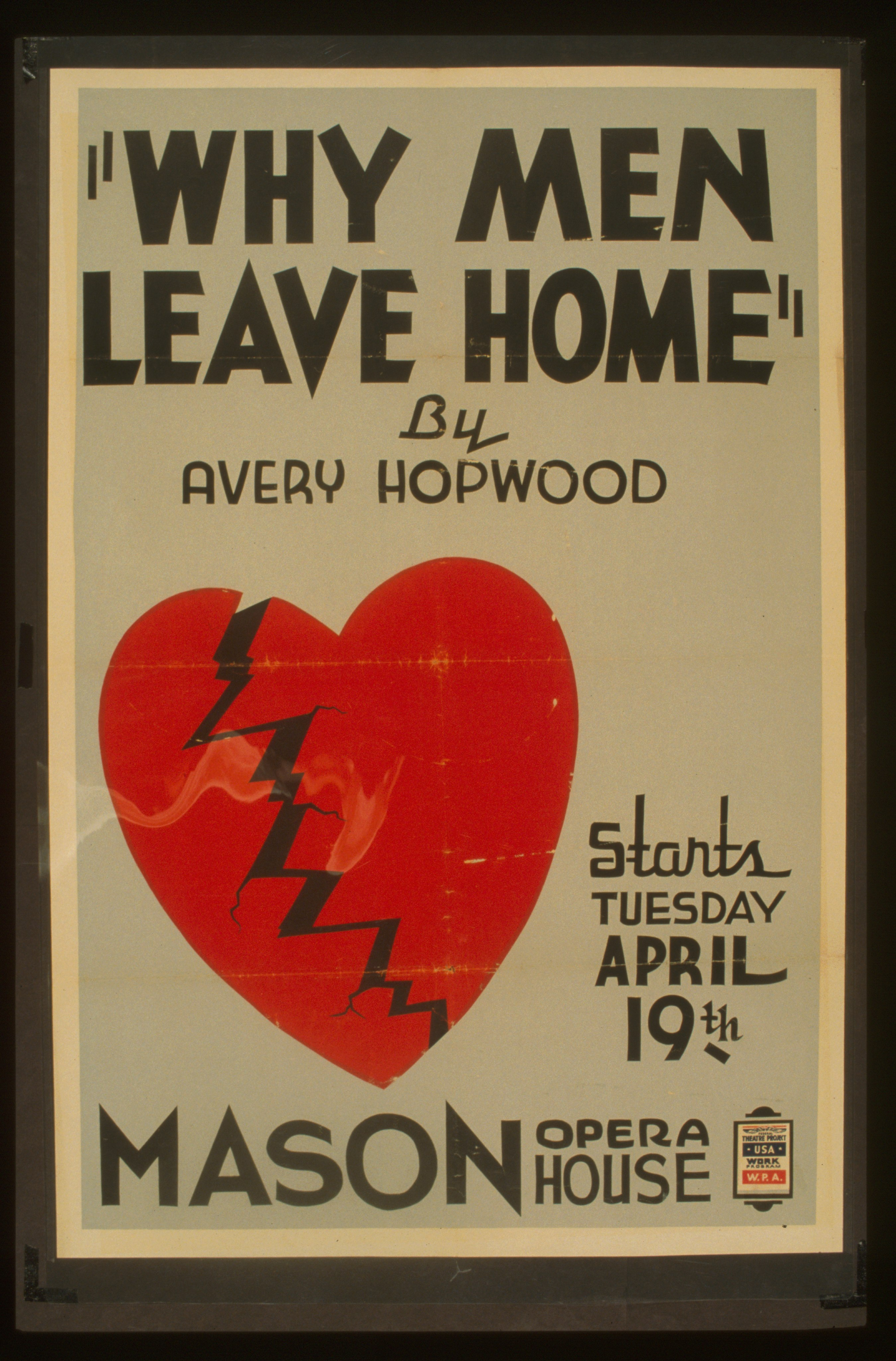
WPA poster for a 1938 Los Angeles production of Hopwood's 1922 play Why Men Leave Home

Why Men Leave Home is a play in three acts by Avery Hopwood. It was adapted into the 1924 silent film Why Men Leave Home.

== Plot ==
Why Men Leave Home is set on Long Island at the country estate of married couple Tom and Fifi Morgan. Tom is lonely and depressed because his wife has been gallivanting across Europe all summer without him, and his not once sent communication back home. He expresses his troubles to his grandmother, and in the midst of doing so Fifi arrives back home. Tom is at first overjoyed, but is quickly upset once again when he discovers Fifi has invited two of traveling companions, Nina and Betty, to stay the weekend. Nina and Betty also bring their neglected husbands with them, and comedy of errors, including a bedroom farce involving infidelity, ensues.

== Performance history ==
Why Men Leave Home premiered at the Apollo Theatre in Atlantic City, New Jersey on July 24, 1922. It then played at the Belasco Theatre in Washington D.C. before transferring to Broadway's Morosco Theatre where it opened on September 12, 1922. The production was produced by Wagenhals and Kemper and starred John McFarlane as Tom and Florence Shirley as Fifi. Others in the cast included Teresa Maxwell-Conover as Nina, Paul Everton as Sam, Audrey Hart as Betty, Norval Keedwell as Billy, Isabel Leighton as Sybil, Wauna Loraine as Doris, Herbert Yost as Artie, Jessie Villars as Grandma, Minor Watson as the Butler, and Peggy Lytton as the Maid. The Broadway run closed in January 1923 after 135 performances.
