= Why Men Leave Home (film) =

1924 film directed by John M. Stahl

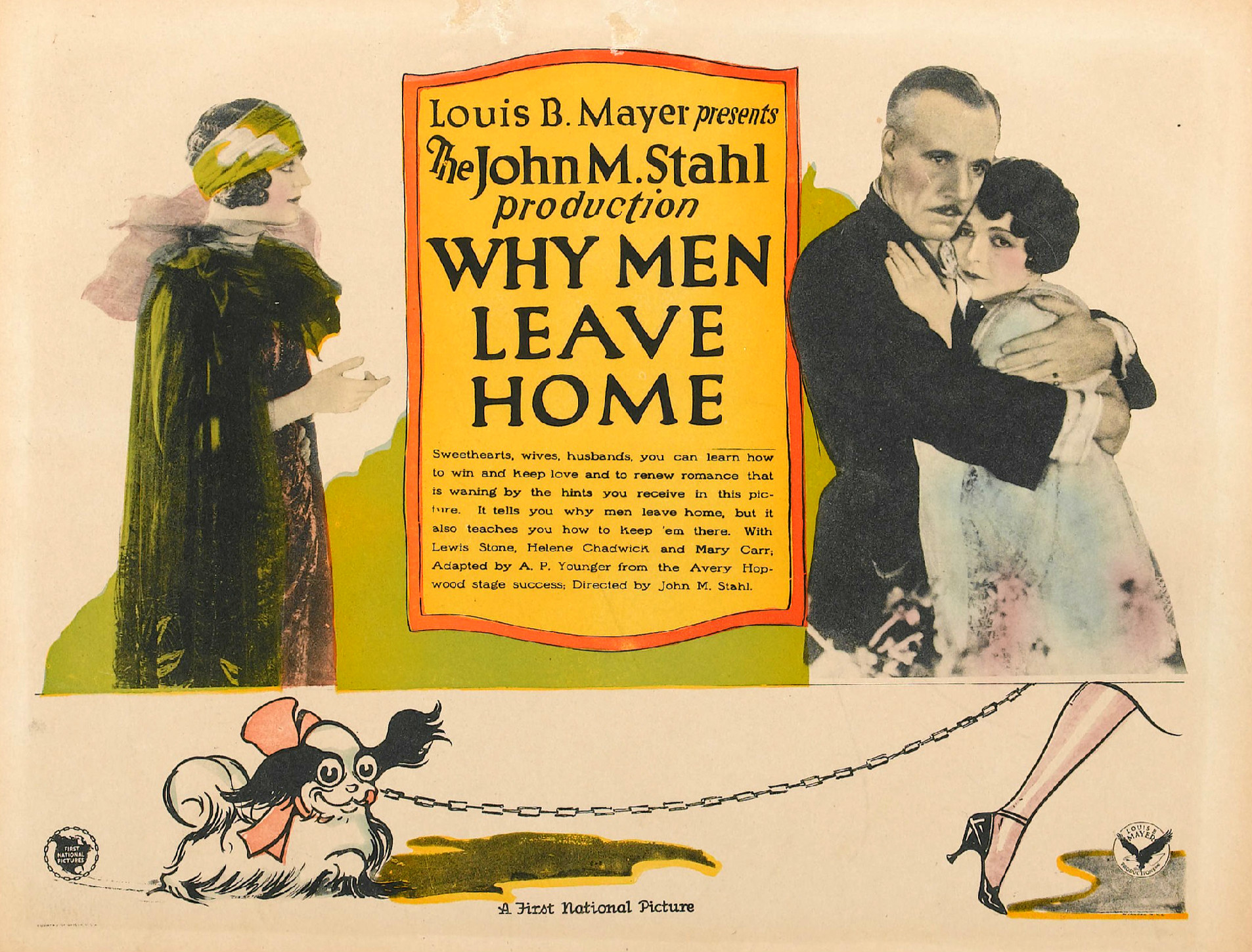
- Lobby card
- Directed by: John M. Stahl; Sidney Algier (assistant director)
- Written by: A. P. Younger (adaptation)
- Based on: Why Men Leave Home by Avery Hopwood
- Produced by: Louis B. Mayer
- Starring: Lewis Stone; Helene Chadwick
- Cinematography: Sol Polito
- Edited by: Margaret Booth; Robert Kern
- Distributed by: Associated First National
- Release date: March 3, 1924
- Running time: 80 minutes
- Country: United States
- Language: Silent (English intertitles)

Why Men Leave Home is a 1924 American silent comedy-drama film directed by John M. Stahl directed and stars Lewis Stone and Helene Chadwick. Produced by Louis B. Mayer and released through First National Pictures (then known as Associated First National), the film is based on the 1922 play of the same name by Avery Hopwood.

== Plot ==
As described in a film magazine review, after a year of wedded life, John Emerson begins to neglect his wife Irene. A love affair develops between him and Jean Ralston, his office secretary. When John comes home after escorting Jean to and from a theater party, the scent of the perfume used by his charmer clings to John and awakens the wife's suspicions. Irene procures a divorce, and John marries the other woman. Later, Grandma Sutton succeeds in luring John and Irene under her roof, and with Dr. Bailey's aid has the place quarantined so that the pair cannot leave. The result is that the old love blooms once more. John's second wife gets a divorce, and he remarries Irene.

== Cast ==
- Lewis Stone as John Emerson
- Helene Chadwick as Irene Emerson
- Mary Carr as Grandma Sutton
- William V. Mong as Grandpa Sutton
- Alma Bennett as Jean Ralston
- Hedda Hopper as Nina Neilson
- Sidney Bracey as Sam Neilson
- Lila Leslie as Betty Phillips
- E. H. Calvert as Arthur Phillips
- Howard Truesdale as Dr. Bailey

== Preservation ==
A print of Why Men Leave Home is preserved by Metro-Goldwyn-Mayer.
