= RKO Bushwick Theatre =

Theatre in New York City (1911–69)

Coordinates: 40.6885°N 73.9208°W

RKO Bushwick Theatre in 1974

RKO Bushwick Theatre was a theatre active at 1396 Broadway in Bushwick, Brooklyn, New York, United States. It opened as the Bushwick Theatre in 1911, and became B. F. Keith's Bushwick Theatre in 1912. It operated under that name until becoming the RKO Bushwick Theatre (RKOBT) in 1929. It continued to operate as RKOBT until closing in 1969. It was briefly a church in the 1970s. It remained vacant for several years before being converted into ACORN High School for Social Justice in 2004. That school later became the Brooklyn High School for Law and Technology which still uses the structure as of 2026.

== History ==
The Bushwick Theatre was built in Bedford–Stuyvesant, Brooklyn, at the corner of Broadway and Howard Avenue in 1911. It was designed by architect William H. McElfatrick, and built for vaudeville theatre chain owner Percy G. Williams at the cost of $225,000. The theatre had a seating capacity of 2,500 people. It opened on September 11, 1911, with a variety program headlined by Irene Franklin and Frank Joseph Fogarty.

In April 1912 the Bushwick Theatre was acquired by theatre magnate Benjamin Franklin Keith, and became a part of the Keith Circuit of vaudeville theatres. By the following July it had been rebranded B. F. Keith's Bushwick Theatre (BFKBT). Some of the vaudeville entertainers who appeared at the theatre under Keith included the Marx Brothers; comedian and singer Sophie Tucker; Ken Murray and his wife Charlotte LaRose; actresses Elsie Janis, Mrs. Leslie Carter, Valeska Suratt and Ione Bright; actor Berton Churchill in a Shakespeare act; minstrel show entertainer Eddie Leonard; female impersonator Julian Eltinge; and Mayme Remington and her all-black cast tap dancing troupe. The theatre was also occasionally used by touring stock theatre companies for performances of plays and musical theatre.

By 1925 the BFKBT was offering screenings of silent films in addition to live entertainment. The theatre continued to operate as BFKBT until 1929 when it became the RKOBT, beginning in February of that year with a screening of the film Annapolis in conjunction a live variety theatre show. Live vaudeville entertainments paired with film screening continued into the 1930s with performers like opera singer Everett Marshall and the comic musical duo Arren and Broderick. The RKOBT continued to operate as a movie theatre until closing in 1969. The building was soon after converted into a church, becoming the Pilgrim Baptist Church. It was a church for a relatively short period in the 1970s.

After the church ceased using the building it lay vacant for many years. In 2004 the building re-opened as the ACORN High School for Social Justice after undergoing renovations to convert it into a school. It later was renamed the Brooklyn High School for Law and Technology in 2010.
