= Fair and Warmer (film) =

1919 film by Henry Otto

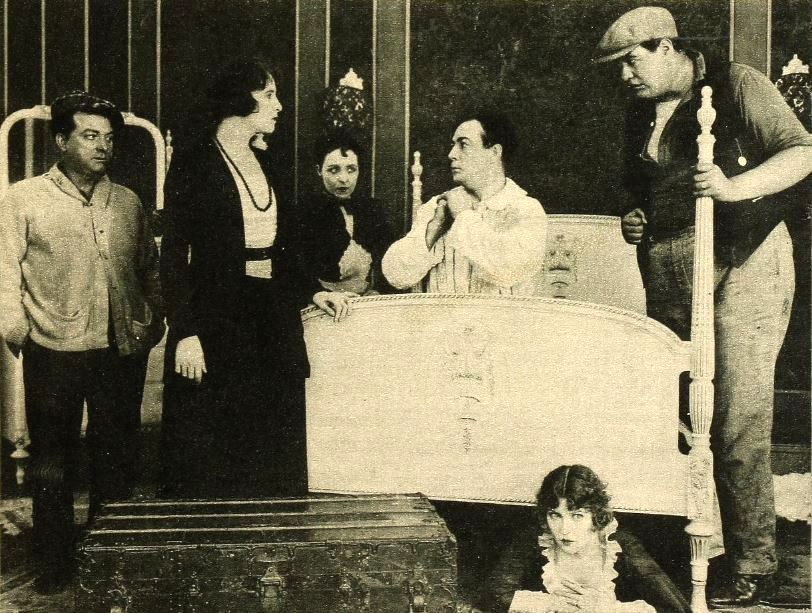
- film still
- Directed by: Henry Otto
- Written by: Avery Hopwood (play): June Mathis; A.P. Younger
- Based on: Fair and Warmer by Avery Hopwood
- Starring: May Allison; Eugene Pallette
- Cinematography: Arthur Martinelli
- Production company: Screen Classics Inc.
- Distributed by: Metro Pictures Corporation
- Release date: November 1, 1919
- Running time: Six reels
- Country: United States
- Languages: Silent; English intertitles

Fair and Warmer is a lost 1919 American silent film directed by Henry Otto starring May Allison and Eugene Pallette. The film was based upon the 1915 Avery Hopwood play Fair and Warmer.

== Plot ==
As described in an adaptation published in the film magazine Shadowland, Billy Bartlett (Pallette) suspects his wife Laura (Mayo), who has been spending time with Philip Evans (Buckley), is having an affair. When upstairs neighbors Jack and Blanny Wheeler (Trenton and Allison) visit to play cards, Jack confides in Billy that, whenever he needs an explanation for his absence, he tells his wife he is going to the Mystic Shrine. Jack and Laura leave separately, and Billy and Blanny discuss their mutual suspicions and get drunk. Jack, Laura, and Philip return to the apartment and Billy and Blanny are wrongly accused of being unfaithful. Laura storms out. Two days later, after having movers go to get the furniture, she returns to the apartment after becoming jealous, and discovers Blanny under Billy's bed. However, the maid (Conley) explains that this is all innocent and Blanny was there looking for Jack. Jack overhears, and explains to Blanny that "Mystic Shrine" was his cover for going out to play poker. They reconcile. Laura, deciding to give up the promiscuous Philip, is also reconciled with Billy.

== Cast ==
- May Allison as Blanny Wheeler
- Pell Trenton as Jack Wheeler
- Eugene Pallette as Billy Bartlett
- Christine Mayo as Laura Bartlett
- William Buckley as Philip Evans
- Effie Conley as Tessie
