= The Man in the Black Derby =

1960 film

- Directed by: Karl Suter
- Written by: Karl Suter
- Produced by: Erwin C. Dietrich; Georges Schellenbaum
- Starring: Walter Roderer
- Release date: 21 July 1960
- Running time: 88 minutes
- Country: Switzerland
- Language: German

The Man in the Black Derby (German: Der Herr mit der schwarzen Melone) is a 1960 Swiss comedy film directed by Karl Suter. It features the film debut of Bruno Ganz, who played a hotel employee.

== Cast ==
- Walter Roderer as Hugo Wiederkehr
- Sabine Sesselmann as Christine Meißen
- Gustav Knuth as Generaldirektor Meißen
- Charles Regnier as Herr von Seelisberg
