= The Best People =

1925 film by Sidney Olcott

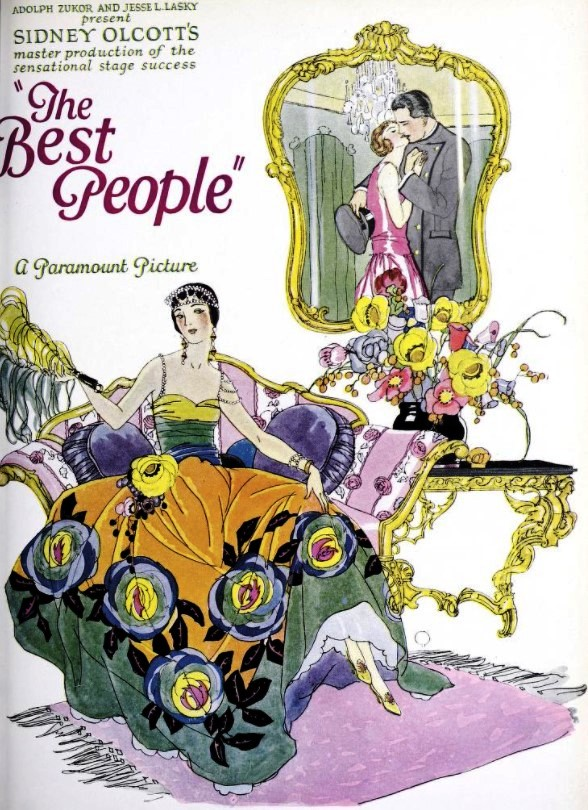
- Advertisement
- Directed by: Sidney Olcott
- Written by: Bernard McConville
- Based on: The Best People by David Gray and Avery Hopwood
- Produced by: Jesse L. Lasky; Adolph Zukor
- Starring: Warner Baxter
- Cinematography: James Wong Howe
- Production company: Famous Players–Lasky
- Distributed by: Paramount Pictures
- Release date: December 28, 1925
- Running time: 6 reels
- Country: United States
- Language: Silent (English intertitles)

The Best People is a 1925 American silent comedy film produced by Famous Players–Lasky and distributed by Paramount. It was directed by Sidney Olcott with Warner Baxter in the leading role.

The film was remade in 1930 as Fast and Loose starring Miriam Hopkins.

== Plot ==
As described in a review in a film magazine, Mrs. Lenox is marrying her daughter Miriam to the scion of another "best family," but the girl prefers their chauffeur, who has red blood instead of blue. Bertie Lenox has fallen in love with an impossible chorus girl who will not marry him until he gives up his money and goes to work. Arthur Rockmere, the fiancé, has arranged a supper with Alice O'Neill, the chorus girl, and her chum, Millie Montgomery, also of the chorus, with the idea of buying Alice off. Bertie resents this private-room affair.

There is a sidewalk fight outside the supper club that lands most of them in the police station, where Millie bails them out with the money Bertie's father has given her to enlist her aid in breaking off the distasteful match, and they all roll home in a taxi the next morning. The children get their hearts' delights, and Millie lands Bertie's Uncle Throckmorton, a self-constituted social arbiter, who richly deserves his fate — and seems to enjoy it.

== Cast ==
- Warner Baxter as Henry Morgan
- Esther Ralston as Alice O'Neil
- Kathlyn Williams as Mrs Lenox
- William Austin as Arthur Rockmere
- Larry Steers as Uncle Throckmorton
- Margaret Livingston as Milly Montgomery
- Joseph Striker as Bertie Lenox
- Margaret Morris as Miriam Lenox
- Ernie Adams as Taxi Driver
- Florence Roberts

== Preservation ==
With no prints of The Best People located in any film archives, it is a lost film
