= Walter Roderer =

Swiss actor and screenwriter

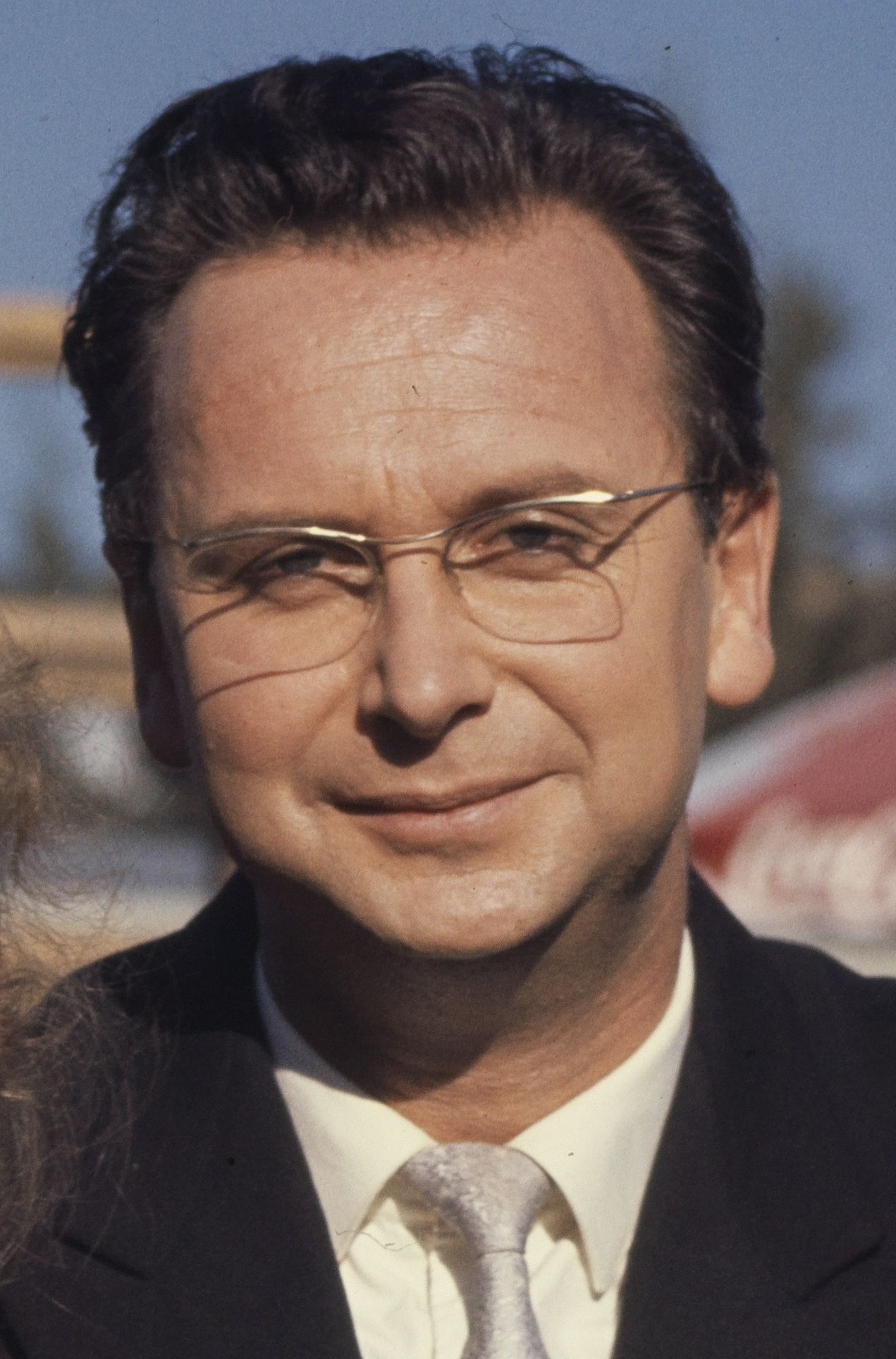
- Born: 3 July 1920; St. Gallen, Switzerland
- Died: 8 May 2012 (aged 91); Illnau, Kanton Zürich; Switzerland
- Occupations: Actor; Screenwriter
- Years active: 1953–1990 (film)

Walter Roderer (3 July 1920 – 8 May 2012) was a Swiss actor and screenwriter. He played several leading film roles including the 1959 comedy The Model Husband.

== Selected filmography ==
=== Actor ===
- The Venus of Tivoli (1953)
- Der 10. Mai (1957)
- The Model Husband (1959)
- The Man in the Black Derby (1960)
- The Maddest Car in the World (1975)
- Ein Schweizer namens Nötzli (1988)
- Der doppelte Nötzli (1990)

== Bibliography ==
- Goble, Alan. The Complete Index to Literary Sources in Film. Walter de Gruyter, 1999.
