= María del Carmen =

1898 opera in three acts composed by Enrique Granados

- Opera by Enrique Granados
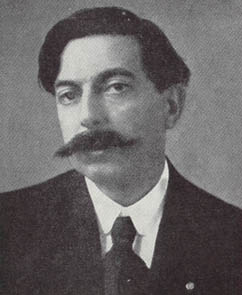
- The composer
- Librettist: José Feliú i Codina
- Language: Spanish
- Based on: the librettist's play of the same name
- Premiere: 12 November 1898; Teatro de Parish in Madrid

María del Carmen is an opera in three acts composed by Enrique Granados to a Spanish libretto by José Feliú i Codina based on his 1896 play of the same name. It was Granados's first operatic success and, although it is largely forgotten today, he considered it to be his best opera. At the end of its initial run in Madrid where it premiered in 1898, Queen Maria Cristina awarded Granados the Charles III Cross in recognition of his work. The opera, sometimes described as a Spanish version of Mascagni's Cavalleria rusticana with a happy ending, is set in a village in the Spanish region of Murcia and involves a love triangle between María (soprano) and her two suitors, the peasant farmer, Pencho (baritone), and his wealthy rival, Javier (tenor).

== Background ==
Sketch by Marià Foix of Josep Feliu i Codina, the librettist of María del Carmen

A critic from the Diario de Barcelona recalled that following the 1896 premiere of Feliú i Codina's stage play María del Carmen, he heard another critic tell the author, "For God's sake don't allow anyone to set this to music." Nevertheless, Feliú i Codina, who had also written the libretto for a one-act zarzuela by Granados, Los Ovillejos, agreed to adapt his play for Granados's opera. The resulting libretto was a considerably shortened version of the original work as well as a simplification of the plot. However, it included additions such as a lavish village procession in Act 1 and a dance number during the fiesta in Act 2. Granados and Feliú i Codina put a fair amount of work into making the libretto 'authentic', travelling to rural Murcia to observe the region's landscape, culture, songs and speech patterns. The composer Amadeo Vives was instrumental in securing the first performance of the opera in Madrid and helped coordinate the production with the Teatro Parish. During the orchestral rehearsals, Granados was assisted by Pablo Casals, who also conducted a private performance of the opera at the Teatro Principal in Madrid prior to its official premiere.

The score of María del Carmen has had a checkered career. Granados had the original manuscript in his luggage when he was drowned in the 1916 sinking of the Sussex by a German U-boat. His luggage, and the Maria del Carmen score, were later recovered from the wreck. In 1939 Granados's son Victor brought the original score (together with original scores of three other works by Granados) to Nathaniel Shilkret and signed a contract for publication of these works by Shilkret and Shilkret's son Arthur. However, objections raised by the rest of Granados's family prevented the works from being published. In December 2009 the complete original score of the opera was transferred to Special Collections in the library at the University of California, Riverside.

According to Walter Aaron Clark's account in Enrique Granados: Poet of the Piano, the only copies of the score available at the time Clark's Granados biography was written probably contain later revisions by Granados's son Eduardo.

== Performance history ==
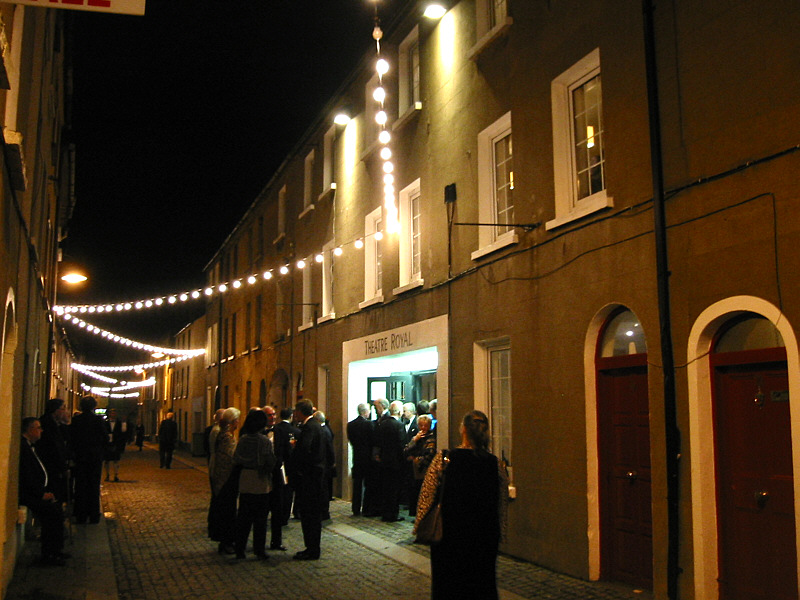
The Theatre Royal, Wexford, where on 23 October 2003 María del Carmen received its first performance outside Spain

María del Carmen premiered at the Teatro de Parish in Madrid on 12 November 1898, conducted by the composer. It had a highly successful reception by the audience and the majority of the critics, and ran until 9 January 1899. Feliú i Codina was not there to share the composer's triumph. He had died the previous year at the age of 52. María del Carmen then premiered in Barcelona on 31 May 1899 at the Teatro Tivoli. On that occasion, the reception was considerably less warm than it had been in Madrid. The Catalan nationalist movement was on the rise as was the Renaixença movement to revive the Catalan language and culture. Sections of the audience were indignant that an opera with a Catalan composer and a Catalan librettist was set outside Catalonia and failed to incorporate Catalan music and themes. One contemporary critic suggested that the only applause came from a hired claque Following its 11 performances at the Teatro Tivoli, the opera had a few performances in Valencia in 1899 and was sporadically performed in Madrid between May 1899 and January 1900. It then sank into virtual oblivion, apart from a 1935 revival at Barcelona's Gran Teatre del Liceu conducted by Joan Lamote de Grignon with the famous soprano Conchita Badía in the title role, and a few other performances in Spain in the 1960s.

Forty years later, the Spanish conductor Max Bragado-Darman prepared a new critical edition of the score, excerpts of which were performed in Murcia in a concert at the Teatro Circo de Orihuela on 23 March 2002 during the Festival Internacional de Orquestas de Jóvenes (International Festival of Youth Orchestras). In 2003 the score was then used for a fully staged production in Ireland at the Wexford Opera Festival. The production which opened on 23 October 2003 at the Theatre Royal, Wexford marked the first and (so far) only fully staged performances of María del Carmen outside Spain. The Wexford production was conducted by Max Bragado-Darman with stage direction by Sergio Vela and Diana Veronese in the title role. The most recent performance, although in concert version only, took place at the Gran Teatre del Liceu on 19 February 2006. It was conducted by Josep Caballé-Domènech with Ana María Sánchez in the title role.

== Roles ==
Role	Voice type	Premiere Cast, November 12, 1898 (Conductor: Enrique Granados)
María del Carmen	soprano	
Pencho, a peasant farmhand, in love with María	baritone	
Javier, a wealthy man, also in love with María	tenor	
Concepción	mezzo-soprano	
Fuensanta	soprano	
Domingo, Javier's father	bass-baritone	
Don Fulgencio, the local doctor	tenor	
Pepuso, an old villager	baritone	
Migalo	bass	
Antón	tenor	
Roque	baritone	
Andrés	tenor	
Un cantaor huertano (a village singer, off-stage voice)	tenor	

== Synopsis ==
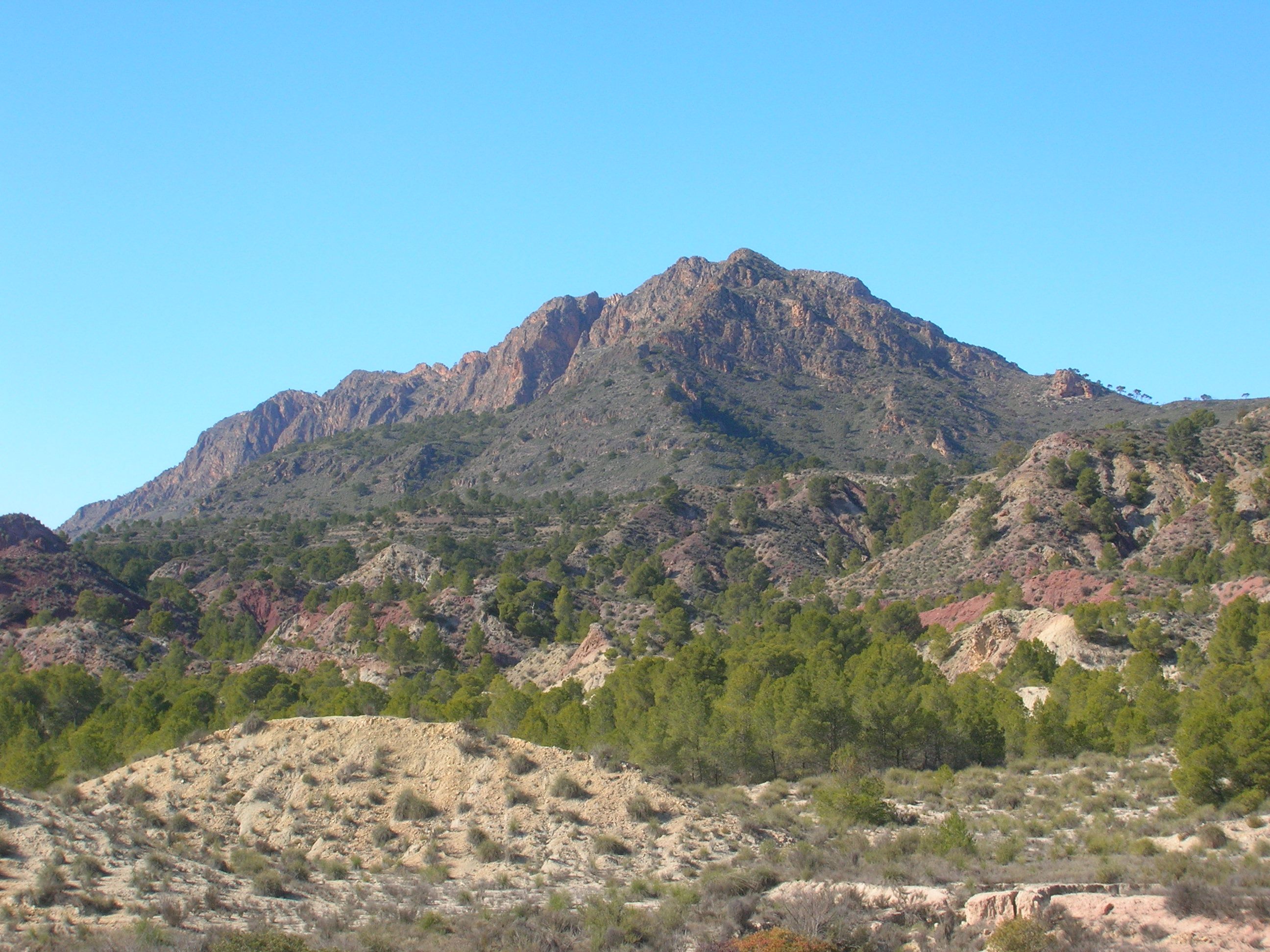
Landscape of rural Murcia, the setting for María del Carmen

Time: late 19th century
Place: a rural village in the Spanish province of Murcia

Pencho, a peasant farmer, and María are in love. Pencho had wounded the wealthy Javier in a fight over water rights and fled to Algeria. In order to save Pencho's life when he returns, María nurses Javier back to health, only to find that he has fallen in love with her too. The action of the opera begins with Pencho's return to the village. To Pencho's dismay, María tells him that she has agreed to marry Javier in order to save him from prosecution. Pencho protests that his honour cannot allow such a sacrifice. During a village fiesta there is a confrontation between Pencho and Javier and the two agree to fight a duel which becomes the focus of the third act.

As the duel approaches, Maria is distraught. While she still loves Pencho, she feels affection for Javier and does not wish to see him killed. Javier's father arrives and unsuccessfully tries to persuade Pencho to relinquish his claim on María. Javier appears and the duel is about to begin. However, tragedy is averted with the arrival of the local doctor, Don Fulgencio. He tells Domingo that Javier is already dying of tuberculosis and nothing can be done to save him. Javier then realizes the futility of the duel, reconciles with María and Pencho, and helps them to escape.

== Recordings ==
María del Carmen – Diana Veronese (María del Carmen); Larisa Kostyuk (Concepción); Silvia Vazquez (Fuensanta); Jesús Suaste (Pencho); Dante Alcalá (Javier); Gianfranco Montresor (Domingo); David Curry (Don Fulgencio); Aleberto Arrabal (Pepuso); Stewart Kempster (Migalo); Ricardo Mirabelli (Antón); Alex Ashworth (Roque); Nicholas Sharratt (Andrés); Vicenç Esteve (Un cantaor huertano). Wexford Festival Opera Chorus, National Philharmonic Orchestra of Belarus, Max Bragado-Darman (conductor). Recorded live at the Theatre Royal, Wexford on 23, 26 and 29 October 2003. Label: Marco Polo 8.225292-93
