= Fast and Loose (1930 film) =

1930 film

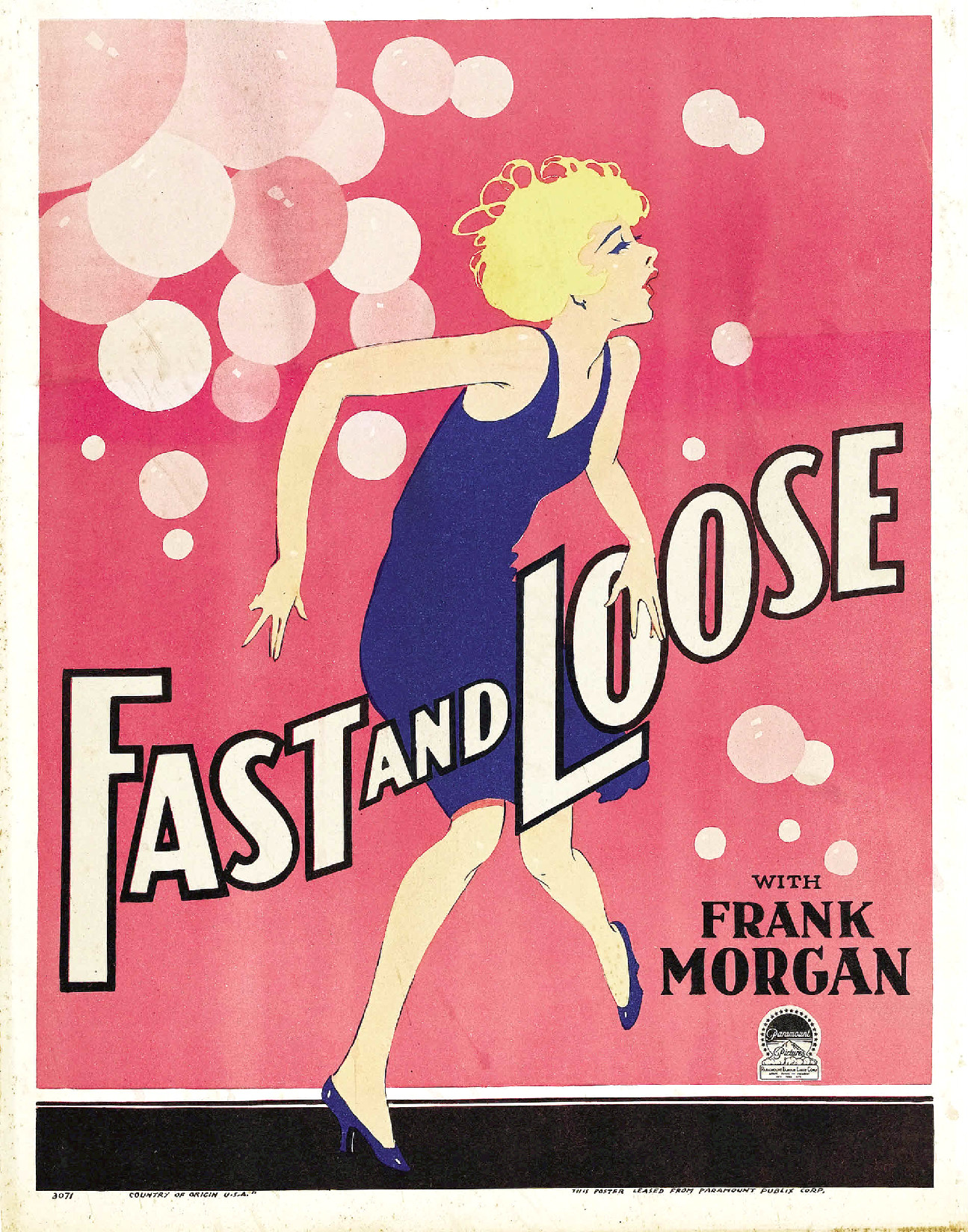
- Theatrical poster
- Directed by: Fred C. Newmeyer
- Written by: Screen story: Doris Anderson; Jack Kirkland; Dialogue: Preston Sturges
- Based on: The Best People; 1924 play by David Gray; Avery Hopwood
- Starring: Miriam Hopkins; Carole Lombard; Frank Morgan
- Cinematography: William O. Steiner
- Distributed by: Paramount Pictures
- Release date: November 8, 1930
- Running time: 70 minutes
- Country: United States
- Language: English

Fast and Loose is a 1930 American pre-Code romantic comedy film directed by Fred C. Newmeyer and starring Miriam Hopkins, Carole Lombard and Frank Morgan. The film was written by Doris Anderson, Jack Kirkland and Preston Sturges, based on the 1924 play The Best People by David Gray and Avery Hopwood. Fast and Loose was released by Paramount Pictures.

Other films or TV series with identical or similar titles, such as the 1939 MGM detective comedy starring Robert Montgomery and Rosalind Russell, are not related to this film.

== Plot ==
Fast and Loose (1930)

The Lenox family of Long Island, headed by Bronson and Carrie, is wealthy and respectful of tradition, but their children Bertie and Marion are more irreverent. When Bertie gets involved with a chorus girl, Alice O'Neil, and Marion falls in love with Henry Morgan, an auto mechanic, the family tries to intervene to prevent their children from marrying beneath themselves.

== Cast ==
- Miriam Hopkins as Marion Lenox
- Carole Lombard as Alice O'Neil
- Frank Morgan as Bronson Lenox
- Charles Starrett as Henry Morgan
- Henry Wadsworth as Bertie Lenox
- Winifred Harris as Carrie Lenox
- Herbert Yost as George Grafton
- David Hutcheson as Lord Rockingham
- Ilka Chase as Millie Montgomery
- Herschel Mayall as Judge Summers

A typographical error in the title cards for this film credited starlet Carol Lombard as Carole Lombard, a name she kept for the remainder of her career.

== Production ==
David Gray and Avery Hopwood's play, The Best People, opened on Broadway on August 19, 1924, and ran for 142 performances. It was later revived in 1933 when it ran for a more modest 67 performances. Hopwood was a prolific and successful playwright, many of whose plays were adapted into films – his 1919 play The Gold Diggers provided the template for the Warner Bros. series of movie musicals.

The Best People was made into a silent film in 1925, The Best People, before Paramount had it refashioned into a vehicle for Miriam Hopkins, an established Broadway star who had just signed with the studio after making the short subject The Home Girl for them in 1928. Fast and Loose was her second film appearance.

Fast and Loose was also Preston Sturges' second Hollywood assignment, after The Big Pond (and its French-language version La grande mare). Carole Lombard, on the other hand, had appeared in over 40 films by the time Fast and Loose was released, all as "Carol Lombard."
