= Fair and Warmer =

1915 comedy play

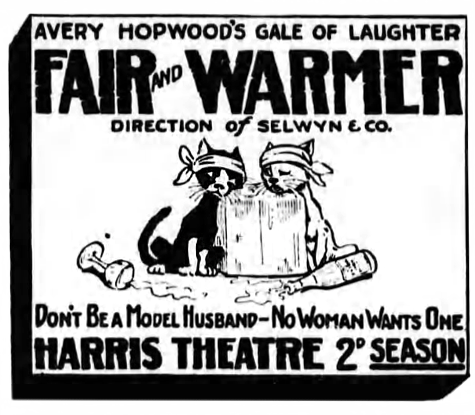
Advertisement in The Sun, July 1916

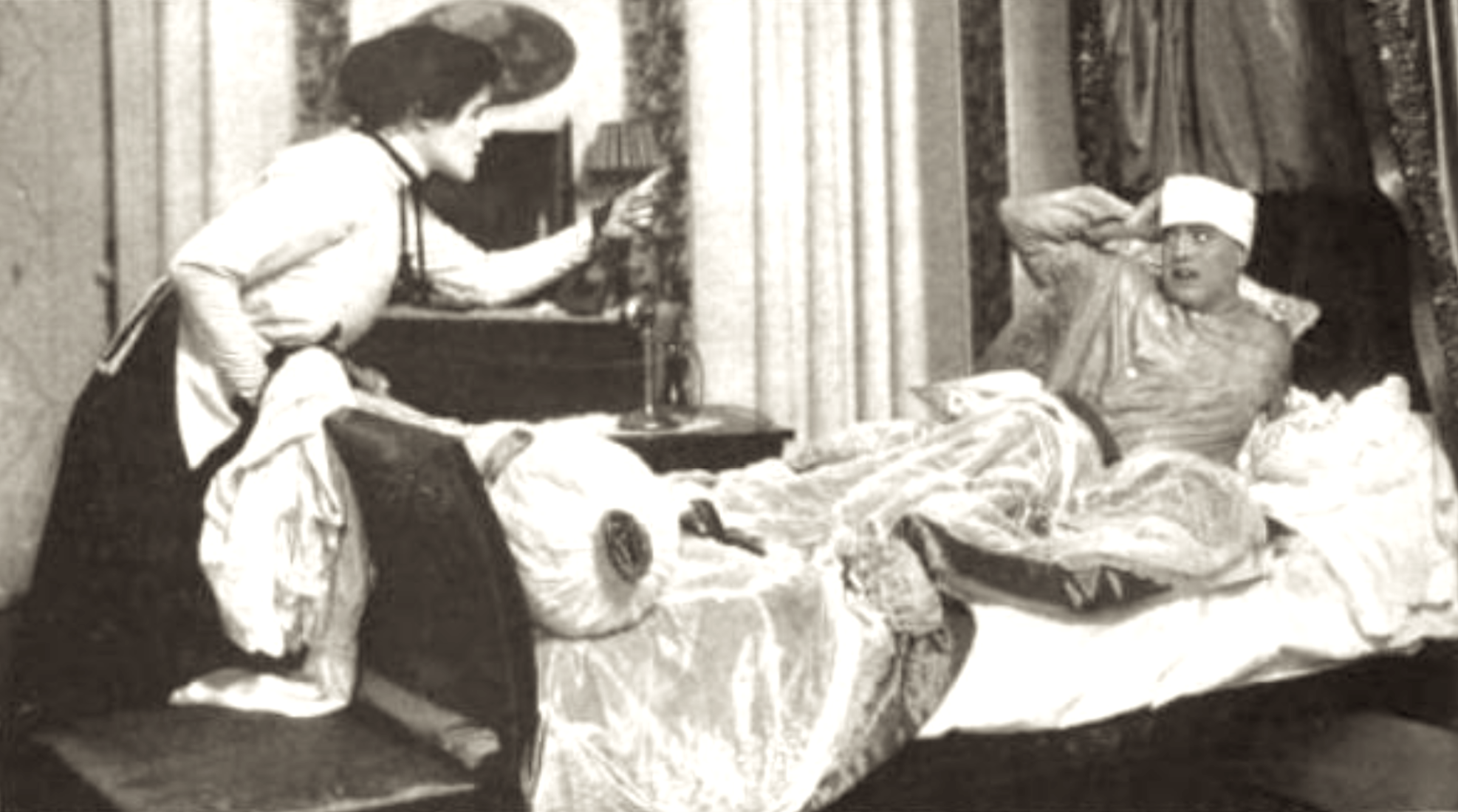
Actors Madge Kennedy and John Cumberland in the 1915 Broadway production of Fair and Warmer.

Fair and Warmer is a three-act comedy play by the American writer Avery Hopwood. It was first staged at the Eltinge Theatre in New York City on November 15, 1915, running for 377 performances, featuring Madge Kennedy, John Cumberland, Janet Beecher, Ralph Morgan, Hamilton Revelle, Olive May, Robert Fisher and Harry Lorraine. Staged by Robert Milton, it was well received by critics. It is a farce about a mild-mannered banker who becomes embroiled in an innocent scheme to rekindle the romance in his marriage using his best friend's wife.

== Plot ==
Friends Laura Bartlett and Jack Wheeler enjoy going out partying, but their respective spouses, Billy Bartlett and Blanche Wheeler, do not. One evening when Laura and Jack are out together, Billy and Blanche decide to try partying themselves. The inexperienced drinkers mix a cocktail so potent that they pass out together after just one drink, leading their spouses to think they are having an affair. Blanche returns the next day to apologize, but Laura has already decided to leave Billy and is having the furniture removed. The misunderstanding is resolved by Tessie, the Barletts' maid.

== Cast and characters ==
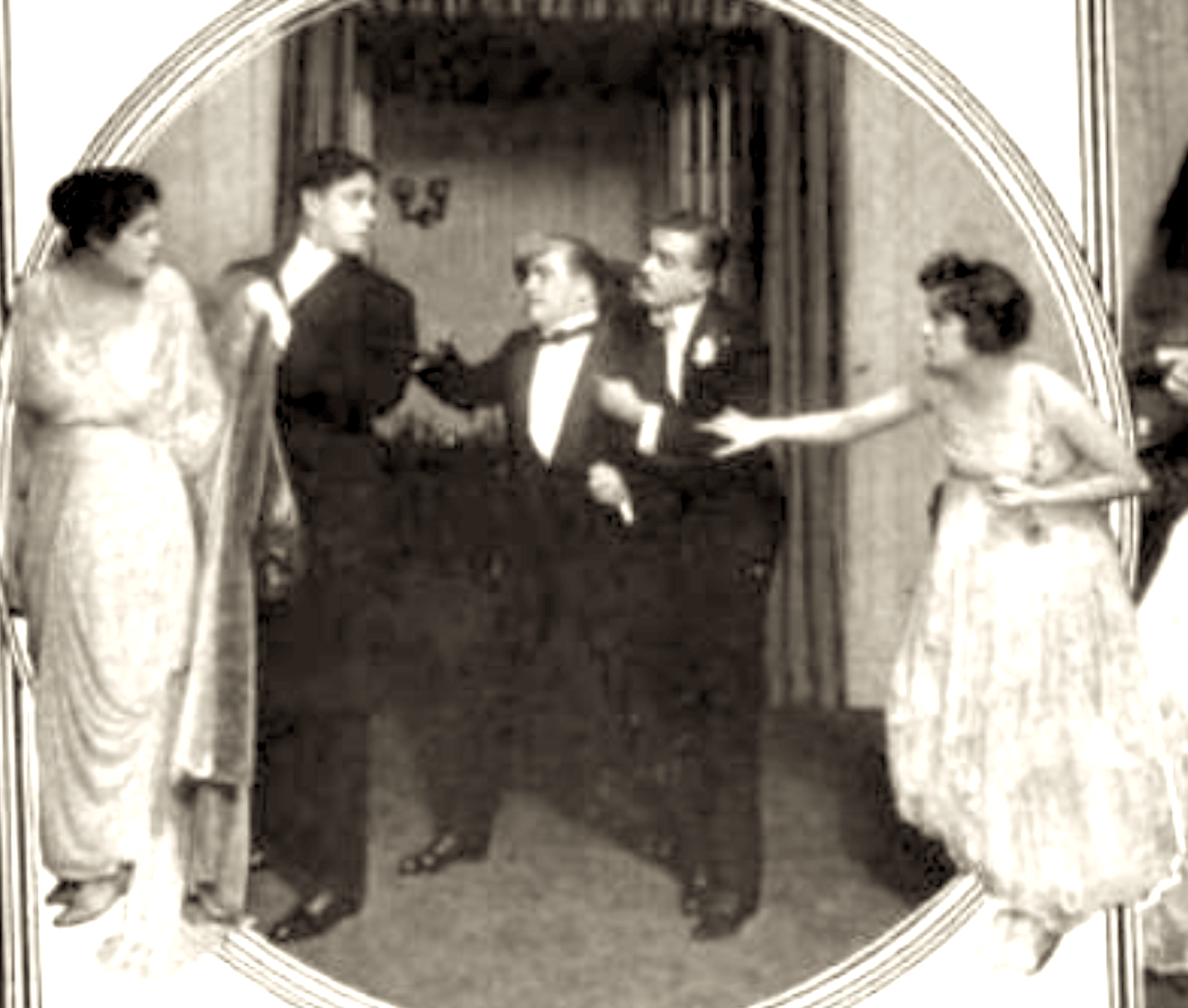
From left to right actors Janet Beecher, Hamilton Revelle, John Cumberland, Ralph Morgan, and Madge Kennedy in Fair and Warmer.

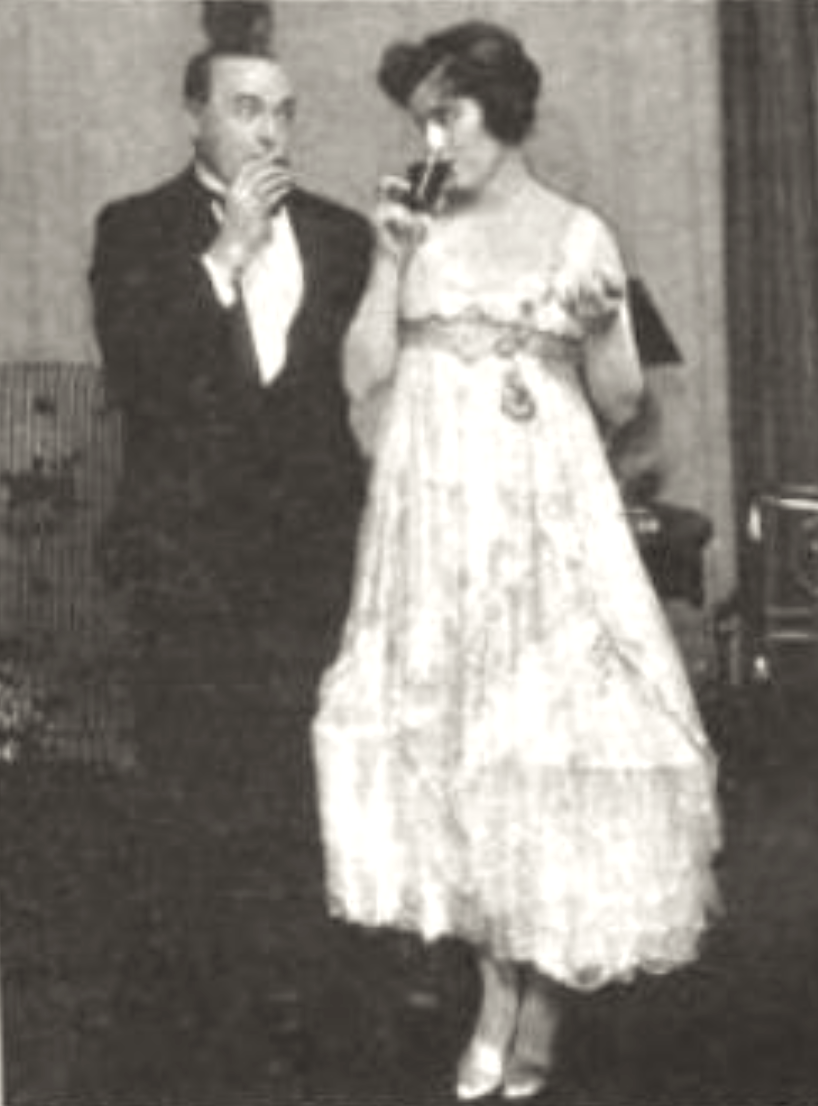
John Cumberland as Billy Bartlett and Madge Kennedy as Blanche Wheeler.

The characters and cast from the Broadway production are given below:

Cast of the Broadway production
Character	Broadway cast
Laura Wheeler	Janet Beecher
Billy Bartlett	John Cumberland
Harrigan	Robert Fisher
Blanche Wheeler	Madge Kennedy
Pete Mealy	Harry Lorraine
Tessie	Olive May
Jack Wheeler	Ralph Morgan
Phillip Evans	Hamilton Revelle

== Reception ==
The reviewer for The New York Times praised the play as well-written and the acting of the Broadway cast, especially Kennedy and Cumberland.

== Film adaptations ==
In 1919 the play was turned into an American silent film of the same title.

The 1937 German comedy The Model Husband with Heinz Rühmann was based on Hopwood's play and was followed up by West German and Swiss remakes in 1956 and 1959, respectively.

A Swedish film version The Green Lift was made in 1944, another Swedish film version The Green Lift in 1952, a Danish film version Den grønne elevator was made in 1961, and a Norwegian film version Den grønne heisen in 1981.

== Bibliography ==
- Fisher, James & Hardison Londre, Felicia. The A to Z of American Theater: Modernism. Rowman & Littlefield, 2009.
