= Avery Hopwood =

American playwright (1882–1928)

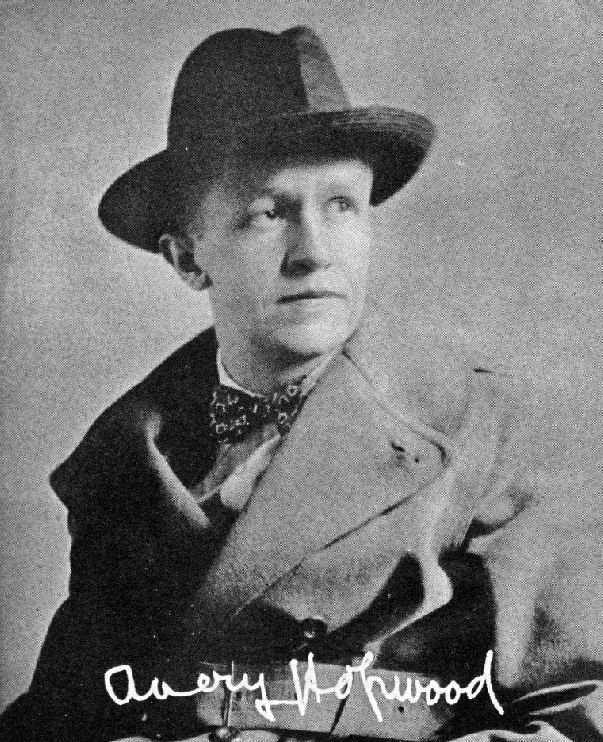
- Hopwood in 1922
- Born: James Avery Hopwood; May 28, 1882; Cleveland, Ohio, U.S.
- Died: July 1, 1928 (aged 46); Juan-les-Pins, Antibes, France
- Education: University of Michigan
- Occupation: Playwright
- Known for: Popularizing the term "gold digger"
- Notable work: The Gold Diggers; The Bat; Spanish Love; Ladies' Night

James Avery Hopwood (May 28, 1882 – July 1, 1928) was an American playwright of the Jazz Age. He had four plays running simultaneously on Broadway in 1920, namely The Gold Diggers, The Bat, Spanish Love, and Ladies' Night (In a Turkish Bath). His most famous work popularized the use of the term "gold digger".

== Early life ==
Hopwood was born to James and Jule Pendergast Hopwood on May 28, 1882, in Cleveland, Ohio. He graduated from Cleveland's West High School in 1900. In 1901, he began attending the University of Michigan in Ann Arbor. However, his family encountered financial difficulties, so for his second year he transferred to Adelbert College (now Case Western Reserve University), located in Cleveland, where he could live at home. He returned to the University of Michigan in the fall of 1903, and graduated Phi Beta Kappa in 1905.

== Career ==
Hopwood started out as a journalist for the Cleveland Leader as its New York correspondent. Within a year he had his first play, Clothes (1906), produced on Broadway, with the aid of playwright Channing Pollock. Hopwood eventually became known as "The Playboy Playwright" and specialized in comedies and farces, some of them with material considered risqué at the time. One play, The Demi-Virgin in 1921, prompted a court case because of its suggestive subject matter, including a risqué game of cards, "Stripping Cupid". The case was dismissed.

His many plays included Nobody's Widow (1910), starring Blanche Bates; Fair and Warmer (1915), starring Madge Kennedy (filmed in 1919); The Gold Diggers (1919), starring Ina Claire in New York and Tallulah Bankhead in London; (filmed in 1923 as The Gold Diggers, in 1928 as Gold Diggers of Broadway and also as Gold Diggers of 1933); Ladies' Night, 1920, starring Charlie Ruggles (filmed in 1928); the famous mystery play The Bat (with Mary Roberts Rinehart), 1920 (filmed in 1926 as The Bat, in 1930 as The Bat Whispers, and in 1959 as The Bat); Getting Gertie's Garter (with Wilson Collison), 1921, starring Hazel Dawn (filmed in 1927 and 1945); The Demi-Virgin, 1921, also starring Dawn; The Alarm Clock, 1923, translated from the French; The Best People (with David Gray), 1924 (filmed in 1925 and as Fast and Loose in 1930 with Clara Bow); the song-farce Naughty Cinderella, 1925, starring Irène Bordoni and The Garden of Eden in 1927, with Tallulah Bankhead in London and Miriam Hopkins in New York; (filmed in 1928 as The Garden of Eden).

== Personal life ==
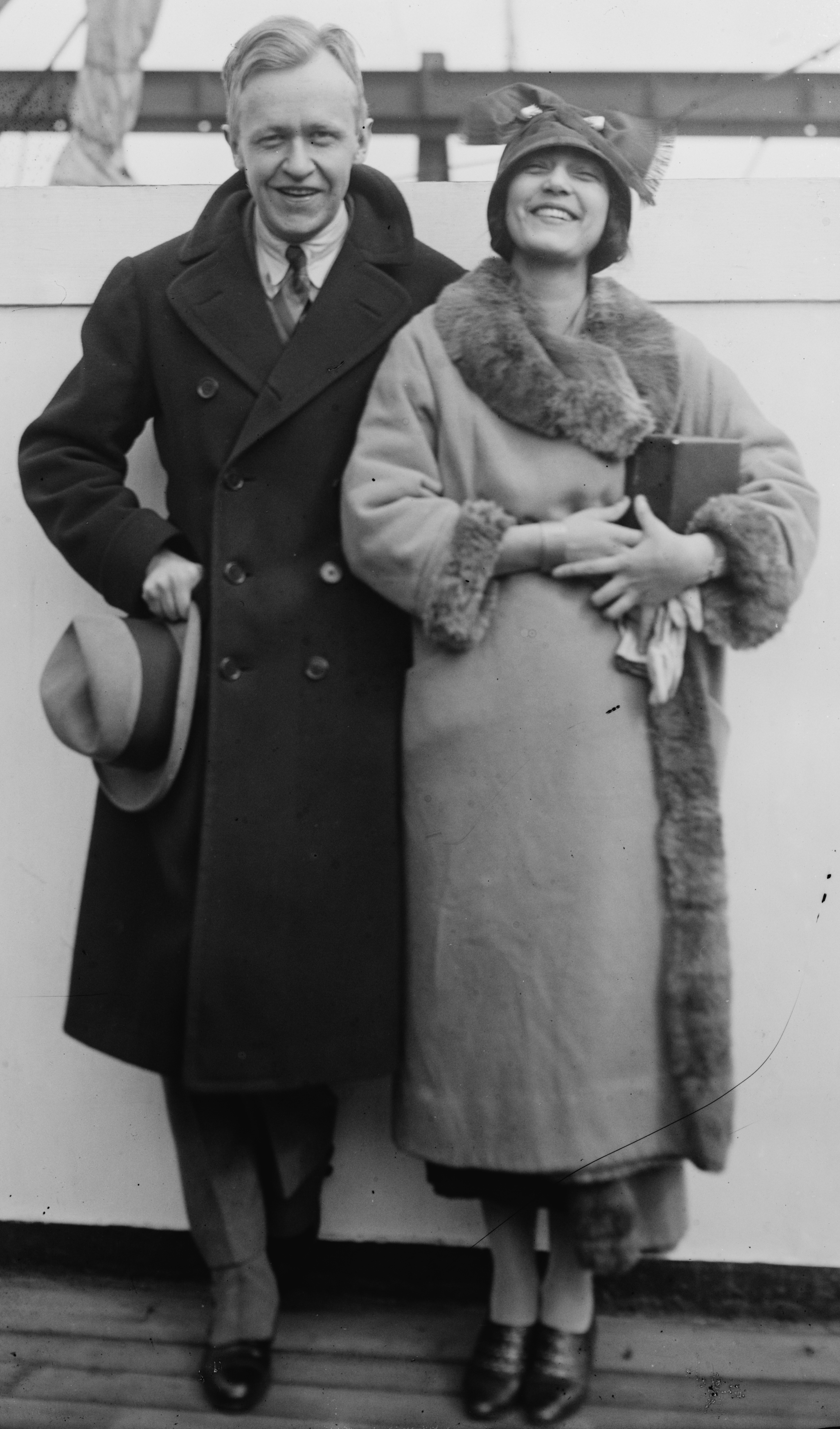
Avery Hopwood with dancer Rosa Rolanda, 1924

In 1906, Hopwood was introduced to writer and photographer Carl Van Vechten. The two became close friends and were sometimes sexual partners. In the 1920s, Hopwood had a tumultuous and abusive romantic relationship with fellow Cleveland-born playwright John Floyd. Although Hopwood announced to the press in 1924 that he was engaged to vaudeville dancer and choreographer Rosa Rolanda, Van Vechten confirmed in later years that it was a publicity stunt. Rolanda would later marry caricaturist Miguel Covarrubias.

On the evening of July 1, 1928, at Juan-les-Pins on the French Riviera, Hopwood suffered a fatal heart attack while swimming. His body was returned to the US and he was buried in Riverside Cemetery, Cleveland.

His mother, Jule Hopwood, inherited a large trust from him, but he had not made arrangements for the disposition of other items, including literary rights. While she was working through the legal issues with his estate, Jule Hopwood fell ill and died on March 1, 1929. She was buried next to her son.

== Legacy ==
Hopwood's plays were very successful commercially, but they did not have the lasting literary significance he hoped to achieve.

=== Hopwood Award ===
The terms of Hopwood's will left a substantial portion of his estate to his alma mater, the University of Michigan, for the establishment of the Avery Hopwood and Jule Hopwood Creative Writing Awards. The bequest stipulated: "It is especially desired that students competing for prizes shall be allowed the widest possible latitude, and that the new, the unusual, and the radical shall be especially encouraged." Famous Hopwood award winners include Robert Hayden, Marge Piercy, Arthur Miller, Betty Smith, Lawrence Kasdan, John Ciardi, Mary Gaitskill, Edmund White, Nancy Willard, Frank O'Hara, and Steve Hamilton.

=== The Great Bordello ===
Throughout his life, Hopwood worked on a novel that he hoped would "expose" the strictures the commercial theater machine imposed on playwrights, but the manuscript was never published. Jack Sharrar recovered the manuscript for this novel in 1982 during his research for Avery Hopwood, His Life and Plays. The novel was published in July 2011 by Mondial Books (New York) as The Great Bordello, a Story of the Theatre, edited and with an Afterword by Sharrar.

== Works ==
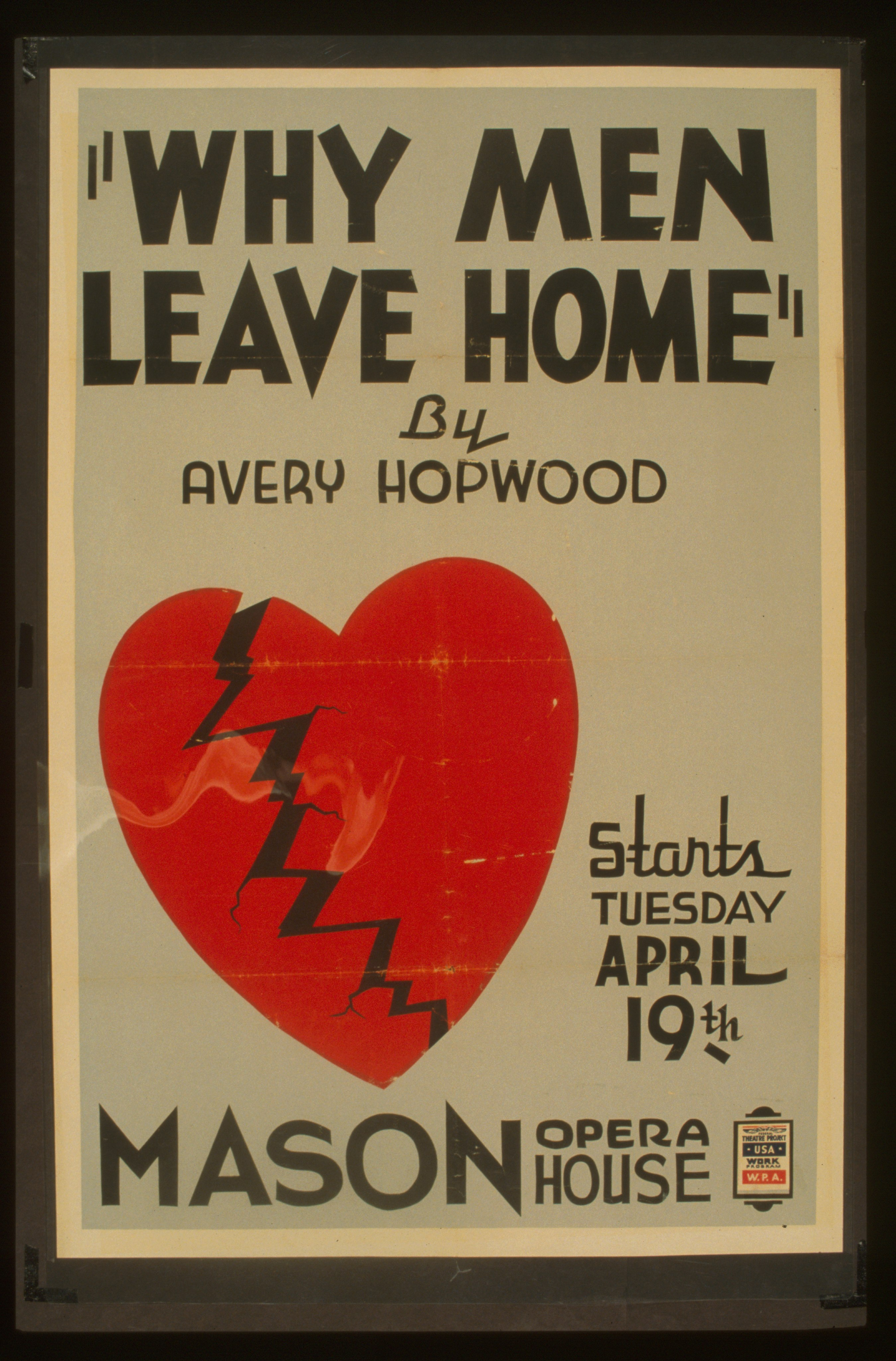
WPA poster for a 1938 Los Angeles production of Hopwood's 1922 play Why Men Leave Home

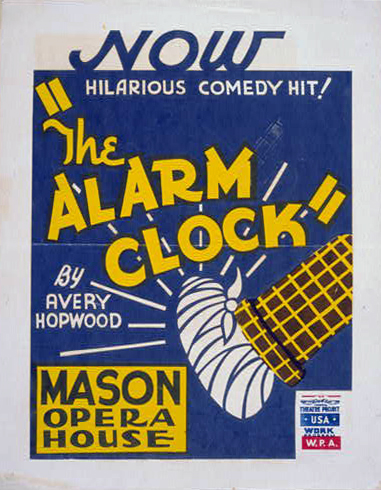
WPA poster for late 1930's Los Angeles production of Hopwood's 1923 play The Alarm Clock

- Clothes (1906) with Channing Pollock
- This Woman and This Man (1909)
- Seven Days (1909) with Mary Roberts Rinehart
- Judy Forgot (1910)
- Nobody's Widow (1910)
- Somewhere Else (1913)
- Fair and Warmer (1915) Remains popular in Germany (Der Mustergatte) and Scandinavia (Gröna hissen )
- Sadie Love (1915)
- Our Little Wife (1916)
- Double Exposure (1918)
- Tumble In (1919, musical version of Seven Days)
- The Gold Diggers (1919)
- The Girl in the Limousine (1919) with Wilson Collison
- Ladies' Night (1920) with Charlton Andrews
- Spanish Love (1920, Adaptation of María del Carmen by Josep Feliu i Codina) with Mary Roberts Rinehart
- The Bat (1920) with Mary Roberts Rinehart
- Getting Gertie's Garter (1921) with Wilson Collison
- The Demi-Virgin (1921)
- Why Men Leave Home (1922)
- Little Miss Bluebeard (1923, Adaptation of Kisasszony férje by Gábor Drégely)
- The Alarm Clock (1923, Adaptation of La Sonnette d'alarme by Maurice Hennequin and Romain Coolus)
- The Best People (1924) with David Gray
- The Harem (1924) with Ernest Vajda
- Naughty Cinderella (1925, Adaptation of Pouche by René Peter and Henri Falk)
- The Garden of Eden (1927, Adaptation of Der Garten Eden by Rudolf Bernauer and Rudolf Österreicher)

== Filmography ==
- Clothes (1914, based on Clothes)
- Judy Forgot (1915, based on Judy Forgot)
- Our Little Wife (1918, based on Our Little Wife)
- Sadie Love (1919, based on Sadie Love)
- Fair and Warmer (1919, based on Fair and Warmer)
- Guilty of Love (1920, based on This Woman and This Man)
- Clothes (1920, based on Clothes)
- The Little Clown (1921, based on The Little Clown)
- The Gold Diggers (1923, based on The Gold Diggers)
- Why Men Leave Home (1924, based on Why Men Leave Home)
- The Girl in the Limousine (1924, based on The Girl in the Limousine)
- Miss Bluebeard (1925, based on Little Miss Bluebeard)
- The Best People (1925, based on The Best People)
- The Bat (1926, based on The Bat)
- Good and Naughty (1926, based on Naughty Cinderella)
- Nobody's Widow (1927, based on Nobody's Widow)
- Getting Gertie's Garter (1927, based on Getting Gertie's Garter)
- The Garden of Eden (1928, based on The Garden of Eden)
- Ladies' Night in a Turkish Bath (1928, based on Ladies' Night)
- Gold Diggers of Broadway (1929, based on The Gold Diggers)
- Her Wedding Night (1930, based on Little Miss Bluebeard)
  - Let's Get Married (France, 1931, based on Little Miss Bluebeard)
  - Su noche de bodas (Spain, 1931, based on Little Miss Bluebeard)
  - Ich heirate meinen Mann (Germany, 1931, based on Little Miss Bluebeard)
  - A Minha Noite de Núpcias (Portugal, 1931, based on Little Miss Bluebeard)
- Fast and Loose (1930, based on The Best People)
- The Bat Whispers (1930, based on The Bat)
- This Is the Night (1932, based on Naughty Cinderella)
- Gold Diggers of 1933 (1933, based on The Gold Diggers)
- Night of the Garter (UK, 1933, based on Getting Gertie's Garter)
- The Model Husband (Germany, 1937, based on Fair and Warmer)
- Unsere kleine Frau (Germany, 1938, based on Our Little Wife)
  - Mia moglie si diverte (Italy, 1938, based on Our Little Wife)
- Gröna hissen (Sweden, 1944, based on Fair and Warmer)
- Getting Gertie's Garter (1945, based on Getting Gertie's Garter)
- Painting the Clouds with Sunshine (1951, based on The Gold Diggers)
- The Green Lift (1952 film) (Sweden, 1952, based on Fair and Warmer)
- The Model Husband (West Germany, 1956, based on Fair and Warmer)
- The Bat (1959, based on The Bat)
- The Model Husband (Switzerland, 1959, based on Fair and Warmer)
- Den grønne elevator (Denmark, 1961, based on Fair and Warmer)
- Den grønne heisen (Norway, 1981, based on Fair and Warmer)
