= Karl Suter =

Swiss film director (1926–1977)

- Born: 23 April 1926; Zurich, Switzerland
- Died: 31 December 1977 (aged 51)
- Occupations: Actor; Director
- Years active: 1959–1973 (film)

Karl Suter (1926–1977) was a Swiss screenwriter and film director. He directed the 1967 Eurospy film Bonditis.

== Selected filmography ==
=== Director ===
- The Model Husband (1959)
- The Man in the Black Derby (1960)
- Chikita (1961)
- Bonditis (1967)

== Bibliography ==
- Cowie, Peter. World Filmography: 1967. Fairleigh Dickinson Univ Press, 1977.
