= The Model Husband (1959 film) =

1959 film

- Directed by: Karl Suter
- Written by: Avery Hopwood (play); Hans Gmür; Walter Roderer; Karl Suter
- Produced by: Erwin C. Dietrich
- Starring: Walter Roderer; Silvia Frank; Hannes Schmidhauser; Olga Gebhard
- Cinematography: Rudolf Sandtner
- Edited by: René Martinet
- Music by: Hans Moeckel
- Production company: Urania Filmproduktion
- Release date: 27 August 1959
- Running time: 97 minutes
- Country: Switzerland
- Language: Swiss German

The Model Husband (German: Der Mustergatte) is a 1959 Swiss comedy film directed by Karl Suter and starring Walter Roderer, Silvia Frank and Hannes Schmidhauser. It is a remake of the 1937 film The Model Husband, which was itself based on a 1915 play Fair and Warmer by Avery Hopwood. Another version The Model Husband had been made in West Germany in 1956.

It is Suter's directorial debut.

== Cast ==
- Walter Roderer as Willy Guggenbühl
- Silvia Frank as Yvonne Leuenberger
- Hannes Schmidhauser as Edi
- Olga Gebhard as Margrit Guggenbühl
- Richard Alexander as Roger Nyffeler
- Giovanna D'Argenzio as Antonella
- Max Haufler as Möbelträger
- Michael Mike as Kbi
- Ernst Stiefel as Jack

== Themes ==
The film contains element of slaptick comedy.

== Bibliography ==
- Luhr, William, ed. (1987). World Cinema Since 1945. New York: Ungar. ISBN 978-0-8044-3078-4.
