= The Green Lift (1952 film) =

Film by Börje Larsson

- Directed by: Börje Larsson
- Written by: Börje Larsson; Stig Järrel
- Based on: Fair and Warmer by Avery Hopwood
- Produced by: Sven Nygren
- Starring: Stig Järrel; Annalisa Ericson; Gunnar Björnstrand
- Cinematography: Olle Ekman
- Edited by: Gösta Lewin
- Music by: Thore Jederby; Gunnar Lundén-Welden; Charlie Norman
- Production company: Imago Film
- Distributed by: Svea Film
- Release date: 26 December 1952
- Running time: 93 minutes
- Country: Sweden
- Language: Swedish

The Green Lift or Going Up by the Green Lift (Swedish: Oppåt med gröna hissen) is a 1952 Swedish comedy film that is both written and directed by Börje Larsson and starring Stig Järrel, Annalisa Ericson and Gunnar Björnstrand. It was shot at the Stocksund Studios in Stockholm and on location around the city. The film's sets were designed by the art director Bibi Lindström. It is based on the 1915 Broadway play Fair and Warmer by Avery Hopwood, which had previously been adapted into a 1944 Swedish film The Green Lift also directed by Larsson.

== Cast ==
- Stig Järrel as William 'Billy' Forsberg
- Annalisa Ericson as Blanche Lövman
- Gunnar Björnstrand as Malte Lövman
- Inger Juel as Marianne Forsberg
- Georg Rydeberg as Philip Lange
- Tollie Zellman as Millie
- Lillebil Kjellén as Elsie
- Gus Dahlström as Gus
- Holger Höglund as Holger
- Georg Adelly as Oscar
- John Botvid as Johansson
- Erna Groth as Majsan
- Axel Högel as Guard
- Gösta Krantz as Guard
- Carl-Gustaf Lindstedt as Guard
- Hanny Schedin as Woman

== Bibliography ==
- Qvist, Per Olov & von Bagh, Peter. Guide to the Cinema of Sweden and Finland. Greenwood Publishing Group, 2000.
