= The Green Lift (1944 film) =

1944 film

- Directed by: Börje Larsson
- Written by: Torsten Lundqvist; Kar de Mumma
- Based on: Fair and Warmer by Avery Hopwood
- Produced by: Olle Brunaeus
- Starring: Max Hansen; Sickan Carlsson; Gaby Stenberg
- Cinematography: Harald Berglund
- Edited by: Wic Kjellin
- Music by: Nathan Görling
- Production company: Europa Film
- Distributed by: Europa Film
- Release date: 31 July 1944
- Running time: 97 minutes
- Country: Sweden
- Language: Swedish

The Green Lift (Swedish: Gröna hissen) is a 1944 Swedish comedy film directed by Börje Larsson and starring Max Hansen, Sickan Carlsson and Gaby Stenberg. It was shot at the Sundbyberg Studios of Europa Film in Stockholm. The film's sets were designed by the art director Max Linder. It is based on the Broadway play Fair and Warmer (1915) by Avery Hopwood. Larsson later remade it into a 1952 film of the same name.

== Cast ==
- Max Hansen as Billy
- Sickan Carlsson as Lillan
- Gaby Stenberg as Ulla
- Karl-Arne Holmsten as Peter
- Håkan Westergren as Filip
- Ernst Eklund as Direktör Bang
- John Botvid as Portvakten
- Julia Cæsar as Portvaktsfrun
- Inga-Bodil Vetterlund as Margit
- Torsten Hillberg as Hammar
- Gustaf Lövås as Porter
- Ludde Juberg as Porter
- Börje Mellvig as Hotel Clerk
- Magnus Kesster as Head Waiter
- Hugo Tranberg as Taxi Driver
- Anna-Lisa Söderblom as Secretary
- Gudrun Moberg as Greta
- Barbro Ribbing as Marianne
- Eivor Engelbrektsson as Vera
- Marianne Gyllenhammar as Sonja
- Lill Astri Stuge as Lady
- Greta Liming as Lillan's Friend
- Carl Andersson as Man
- Greta Forsgren as Assistant at the Dog's Barber Shop
- Gustaf Färingborg as Gentleman on the Street
- Lisbeth Hedendahl as Young Woman with Glasses and Black Hat
- Nils Hultgren as Lövgren
- Margareta Jungmarker as Britta, Ulla's Friend
- Arne Källerud as Bowling Player
- Elly Nylén as Woman at the Restaurant

== Bibliography ==
- Bock, Hans-Michael and Bergfelder, Tim. The Concise Cinegraph: An Encyclopedia of German Cinema. Berghahn Books, 2009.
