= Getting Gertie's Garter (1927 film) =

1927 film

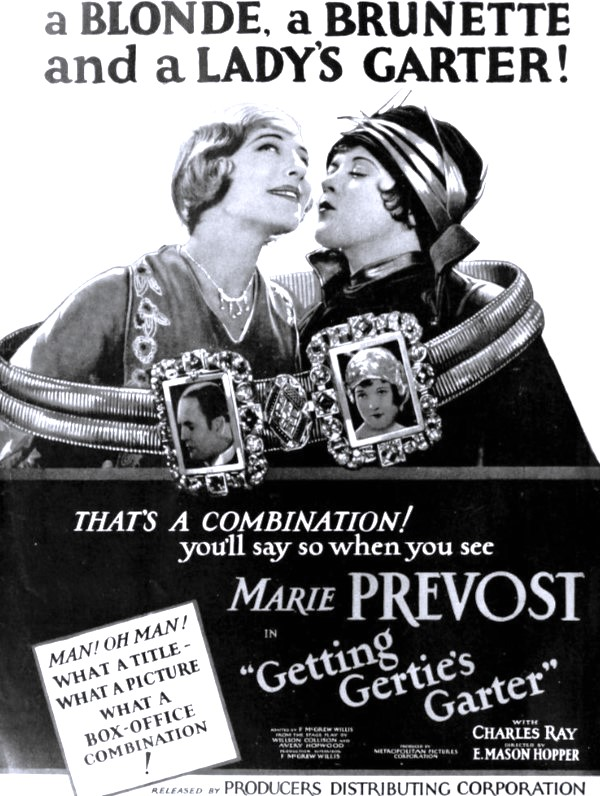
- Advertisement
- Directed by: E. Mason Hopper
- Written by: Anthony Coldeway; Tay Garnett; Leslie Mason; F. McGrew Willis
- Based on: Getting Gertie's Garter by Wilson Collison and Avery Hopwood
- Produced by: John C. Flinn; F. McGrew Willis
- Starring: Marie Prevost; Charles Ray; Sally Rand
- Cinematography: Harold Rosson
- Edited by: James B. Morley
- Production company: Metropolitan Pictures Corporation of California
- Distributed by: Producers Distributing Corporation
- Release date: February 28, 1927
- Running time: 70 minutes
- Country: United States
- Language: Silent (English intertitles)

Getting Gertie's Garter is a 1927 American silent comedy film directed by E. Mason Hopper and starring Marie Prevost, Charles Ray, and Sally Rand. It is an adaptation of the 1921 play of the same name by Wilson Collison and Avery Hopwood.

== Cast ==
- Marie Prevost as Gertie Darling
- Charles Ray as Ken Walrick
- Harry Myers as Jimmy Felton
- Sally Rand as Teddy Desmond
- William Orlamond as Jenkins
- Fritzi Ridgeway as Barbara Felton
- Franklin Pangborn as Algy Brooks
- Dell Henderson as Barry Scott
- Lila Leslie as Teddy's Aunt

== Preservation ==
The film is preserved at the UCLA Film & Television Archive.

== Bibliography ==
- Munden, Kenneth White. The American Film Institute Catalog of Motion Pictures Produced in the United States, Part 1. University of California Press, 1997.
