= Getting Gertie's Garter (play) =

1921 play by Wilson Collison and Avery Hopwood

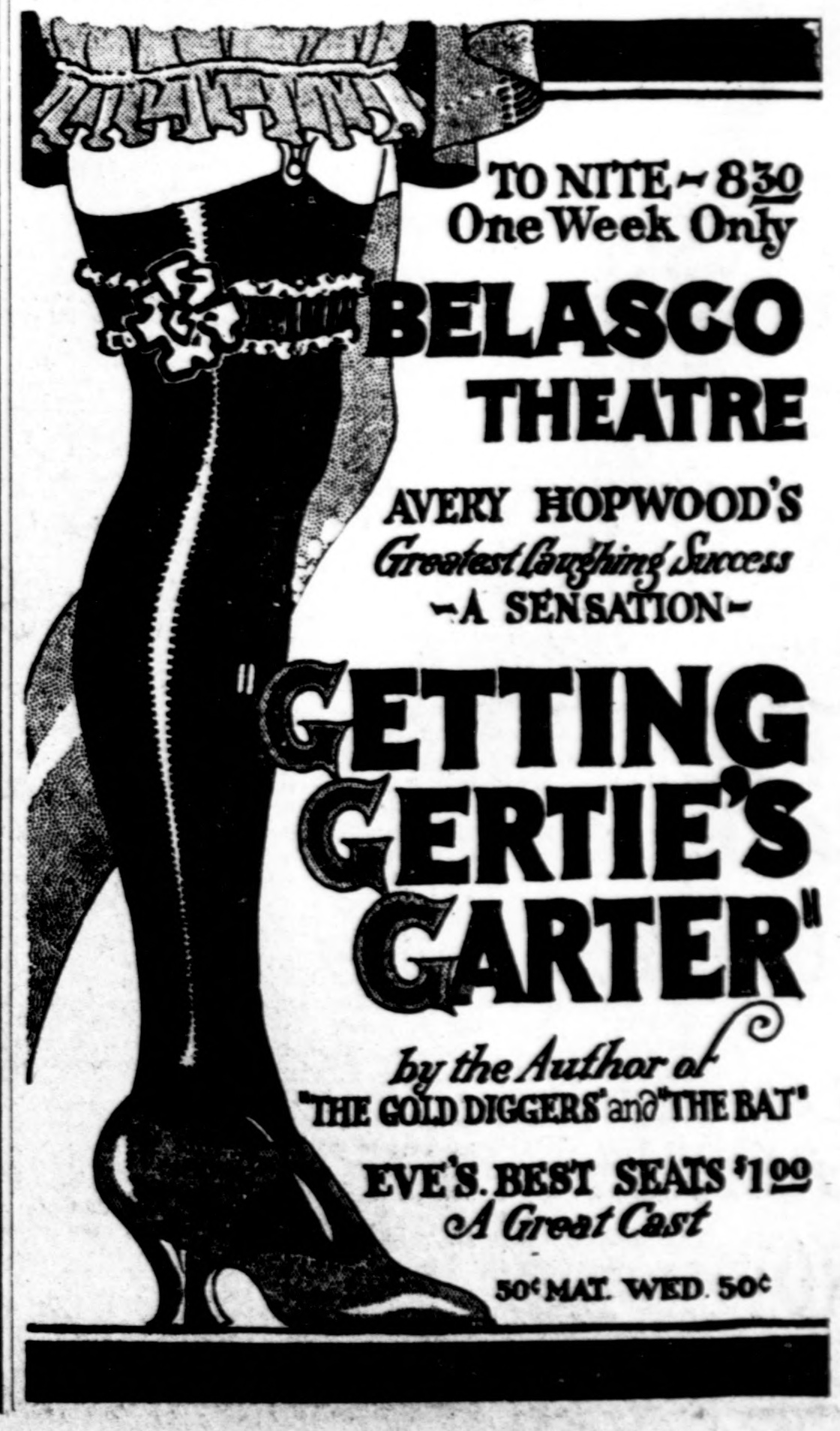
- Contemporary newspaper advertisement.
- Original language: English
- Written by: Wilson Collison, Avery Hopwood
- Genre: Farce

Premiere
- Date: August 1, 1921
- Place: Republic Theatre

Getting Gertie's Garter is a play written by Wilson Collison and Avery Hopwood. Producer A. H. Woods staged it on Broadway, where it opened at the Republic Theatre on August 1, 1921. Hazel Dawn played the role of Gertie. The play was a sex farce, but unlike most productions of its type, the setting was a hayloft instead of a bedroom. It was a success at the box office, running for 15 weeks with 120 performances on Broadway, then moving to touring companies.

The play had tryouts starting in Brooklyn, then in Boston and Chicago under the reduced title of Gertie's Garter. Dawn found her role unsatisfying due to its similarity to her part in Up in Mabel's Room, an earlier farce produced by Woods, but stuck with the show. She eventually left the Broadway production in September to take the lead in another Woods-produced farce, The Demi-Virgin.

== Review ==
Critic Dorothy Parker described the play in a November 1921 theater review column for Ainslee's Magazine

There is little use in retelling the plot of Getting Gertie's Garter, even if one could keep track of it. The title is, in itself, a complete scenario. The quest for the garter includes several badly confused sets of married couples, a comedy butler, a French maid, and a generous assortment of lines at which large ladies in the audience laugh hysterically and nudge their companions viciously. It is a curious thing that the Messrs. Collison and Hopwood will go as far as it is humanly possible, with the limits of the English language, to get a questionable line, but that they will permit no mention of the human leg, nor of the accouterments worn thereon. They do not even allow themselves the use of the word "limb", preferring some much more circuitous reference, while the garter is described as "something a girl must use to keep up her—er—appearances." What do you make of this, my dear Freud?... It is discouraging to report that, despite the heroic work of its cast and the labor of its authors, Getting Gertie's Garter remains far less depraved than those who have its success at heart could wish.

== Adaptations ==
The play was adapted as a movie three times. In 1927, E. Mason Hopper directed a silent film version, using the title Getting Gertie's Garter, with Marie Prevost as Gertie. In 1933, the first sound film adaptation was made by the British and Dominions studio under the title Night of the Garter. Jack Raymond directed the film, which starred Sydney Howard, Winifred Shotter and Elsie Randolph. Allan Dwan directed the third adaptation in 1945, again using the title Getting Gertie's Garter. Dennis O'Keefe, Marie McDonald, and Barry Sullivan starred.
