= Josep Feliu i Codina =

Catalan journalist, novelist and playwright

Sketch of Josep Feliu i Codina by Marià Foix (1860–1914)

Josep Feliu i Codina (also known by his Spanish name José Feliú y Codina; 11 June 1845 – 2 May 1897) was a Catalan journalist, novelist and playwright whose work is linked to the Realist movement and to the Catalan Renaixença.

== Biography ==
Codina was born in Barcelona in May 1845. An affiliate of the Partit Liberal Dinàstic (Liberal Monarchist Party), he took a law degree in 1867 and worked in several administrative posts for the party. He also began his literary career at that time, initially writing in Catalan. In 1867, he founded the weekly periodical La Pubilla. A year earlier, he had produced his first comedy Un mosquit d'arbre (A Mosquito Tree), and in 1871 his first serious play, Els fadrins externs (The Strange Companions). He also collaborated (under the pseudonym "Josep Serra") on several plays by Frederic Soler. During his time in Barcelona he went on to write several more plays and novels, and founded two more periodicals, Lo Nunci and La Jornada.

In 1886, Feliu i Codina moved to Madrid where he became fluent in Spanish. He was the editor La Iberia and also wrote for El Rhin, La América, La Revolución, and La Democracia. Once in Madrid, much of his dramatic output was written in Spanish. Two of his most well-known plays from that time are La Dolores (1892) which formed the libretto for Tomás Bretón's 1895 opera of the same name and María del Carmen (1896) which formed the libretto for Enrique Granados's 1898 opera, María del Carmen. Both plays had several film adaptations. María del Carmen was also the basis of a Broadway musical, Spanish Love, which opened on 17 August 1920 at the Maxine Elliott Theatre in New York City and ran for 308 performances. In addition to his own plays and novels, he translated into Spanish a collection of tales by the Italian Renaissance writer, Matteo Bandello, and several short stories by the French novelist and playwright, Honoré de Balzac.

Feliu i Codina's brother, Antoni Feliu i Codina (1846–1917), was a prominent politician and man of letters. Both brothers wrote for the Catalan literary magazine, Un troç de paper. Josep Feliu i Codina died in Madrid on 2 May 1897.
