= The Model Husband (1937 film) =

1937 film

- Directed by: Wolfgang Liebeneiner
- Written by: Avery Hopwood (play); Jacob Geis; Hans Albin; Heinz Rühmann
- Produced by: Herbert Engelsing; Otto Ernst Lubitz
- Starring: Heinz Rühmann; Leny Marenbach; Hans Söhnker; Heli Finkenzeller
- Cinematography: Werner Bohne
- Edited by: Gustav Lohse
- Music by: Hans Sommer
- Production company: Imagoton
- Distributed by: Tobis Film
- Release date: 13 October 1937
- Running time: 95 minutes
- Country: Germany
- Language: German

The Model Husband (German: Der Mustergatte) is a 1937 German comedy film directed by Wolfgang Liebeneiner and starring Heinz Rühmann, Leny Marenbach, and Hans Söhnker. It is based on a 1915 American play Fair and Warmer by Avery Hopwood. It was shot at the Johannisthal Studios in Berlin. The film's sets were designed by the art directors Otto Gülstorff and Hans Minzloff. The film was screened at the Venice Film Festival where it won an award. In the 1950s, it was remade twice: a 1956 West German film The Model Husband and a 1959 Swiss The Model Husband. The film was censored for youth by the Nazis.

== Synopsis ==
A London banker makes a business trip to Venice where he falls in love with a woman who thinks her boyfriend is cheating. They get married.

Two years have passed and she is bored because he is indeed a "model husband" who never looks at other women and who other women show no interest in. Apparently she wished for a model husband but unconsciously desired a Don Juan. Once he understands, he acts like one (a little) and she falls in love with him all over again.

== Cast ==
- Heinz Rühmann as Billy Bartlett
- Leny Marenbach as Margret Bartlett
- Hans Söhnker as Jack Wheeler
- Heli Finkenzeller as Doddy Wheeler
- Werner Fuetterer as Fred Evans
- Jola Jobst as Ellen Wilson
- Leopold von Ledebur as Sparkins
- Josi Holsten as Exotin
- Alexa von Porembsky as Mary
- Richard Ulrich as Georg
- Ernst Legal as Möbelpacker
- Eva Behmer as Zuschauerin beim Tennistraining
- Max Holzboer as Trainer
- Michael von Newlinsky as Hardings Geschäftspartner
- Angelo Ferrari as Schiedsrichter
- Kurt Felden as Mr. Harding

== Bibliography ==
- Bock, Hans-Michael; Bergfelder, Tim, eds. (2009). The Concise Cinegraph: Encyclopaedia of German Cinema. New York: Berghahn Books. ISBN 978-1-57181-655-9.
- Hake, Sabine (2001). Popular Cinema of the Third Reich. Austin: University of Texas Press. ISBN 978-0-292-73458-6.
- Klaus, Ulrich J. Deutsche Tonfilme: Jahrgang 1937. Klaus-Archiv, 1988.
