= Anders Hatlo =

- Born: August 17, 1947 (age 78)
- Occupation(s): Actor; Voice actor
- Children: Hege Hatlo

Anders Christian Hatlo (born 17 August 1947) is a Norwegian actor and voice actor.

Hatlo became famous for his role as Sigurdsson in the TV-series Nitimemordet, also known as Helmer og Sigurdson, that aired on NRK in the 70s.

During the 1990s, Hatlo was the host of Lingo that aired on TVNorge.

Hatlo has also dubbed several cartoons into Norwegian, most notably Scuttle in The Little Mermaid, Iago in Aladdin and Zazu in The Lion King.

== Private life ==
Hatlo married May-Lis Hatlo in 1975; they have three children together. Their daughter Hege won the Miss Norway contest in 2002.
