= The Model Husband (1956 film) =

1956 film directed by Erik Ode

- Directed by: Erik Ode
- Written by: Helmuth M. Backhaus; Hanns H. Fischer; Jacob Geis
- Based on: Fair and Warmer (play) by Avery Hopwood
- Produced by: Willy Laschinsky; Fritz Renner; Alfred Bittins
- Starring: Harald Juhnke; Inge Egger; Theo Lingen; Gardy Granass
- Cinematography: Otto Baecker
- Edited by: Anneliese Artelt
- Music by: Kurt Wege
- Production company: Omega Film
- Release date: 18 September 1956
- Running time: 98 minutes
- Country: West Germany
- Language: German

The Model Husband (German: Der Mustergatte or Kann ein Mann sooo treu sein...) is a 1956 West German comedy film directed by Erik Ode and starring Harald Juhnke, Inge Egger and Theo Lingen. It is a remake of the 1937 film The Model Husband, which was itself based on the 1915 Avery Hopwood play Fair and Warmer. The Film Lexicon found it "[s]ignificantly less funny than its predecessor.” As did other commentators.

== Cast ==
- Harald Juhnke as Billy Haber
- Inge Egger as Margret Haber
- Theo Lingen as Jakob Wieler
- Gardy Granass as Dolly Wieler
- Boy Gobert as Freddy Evans
- Paul Heidemann as 1. Direktor
- Gert Kollat as 3. Argentinier
- Franz-Otto Krüger as 1. Argentinier
- Sigrid Lagemann as Fanny, Dienstmädchen
- Ursula Lingen as Alma Sedlmayr
- Rolf Weih as 2. Argentinier
- Ralf Wolter as Trainer
- Eddi Arent

== Bibliography ==
- Bock, Hans-Michael; Bergfelder, Tim, eds. (2009). The Concise Cinegraph: Encyclopaedia of German Cinema. New York: Berghahn Books. ISBN 978-1-57181-655-9.
