= Bluebeard's 8th Wife =

1923 film by Sam Wood

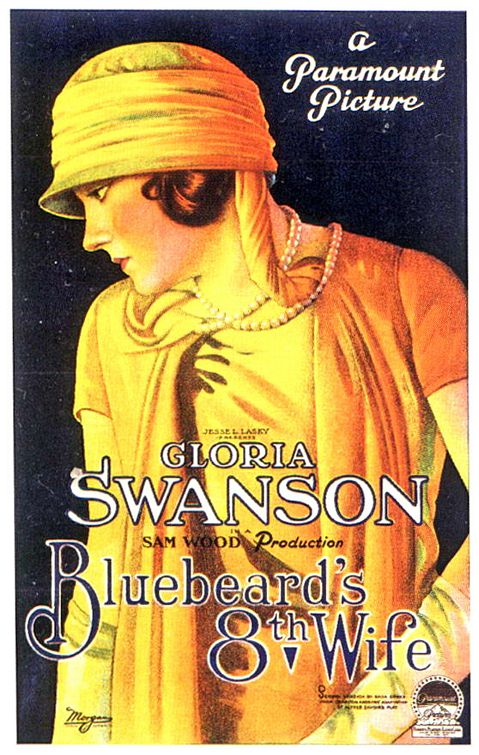
- 1923 theatrical poster
- Directed by: Sam Wood
- Written by: Charlton Andrews (adaptation)
- Screenplay by: Sada Cowan
- Based on: La huitième femme de Barbe-Bleue by Alfred Savoir
- Produced by: Adolph Zukor; Jesse Lasky
- Starring: Gloria Swanson
- Cinematography: Alfred Gilks
- Distributed by: Paramount Pictures
- Release date: August 23, 1923
- Running time: 60 minutes
- Country: United States
- Language: Silent (English intertitles)

Bluebeard's 8th Wife (alternately Bluebeard's Eighth Wife) is a 1923 American silent romantic comedy film produced by Famous Players–Lasky and distributed by Paramount Pictures. It was directed by Sam Wood and stars Gloria Swanson. The film is based on the French play La huitième femme de Barbe-Bleue by Alfred Savoir which is based on the Bluebeard tales of the 15th century. The play ran on Broadway in 1921 starring Ina Claire in the Swanson role.

Paramount remade the story in 1938 directed by Ernst Lubitsch and starring Gary Cooper and Claudette Colbert.

== Plot ==
As described in Exhibitors Trade Review, Mona marries John Brandon and immediately after discovers that she is his eighth wife. Determined that she will not be the eighth to be divorced from him, she sets out on a teaser campaign which proves very effective until Brandon tells her that she is bought and paid for. Furious, she determines to give him grounds for a divorce and is subsequently found in her room with another man. In the end, however, Brandon discovers that she really loves him and they leave for a happy honeymoon.

== Cast ==
- Gloria Swanson as Mona deBriac
- Huntley Gordon as John Brandon
- Charles Greene as Robert
- Liane Salvor as Lucienne
- Paul Weigel as Marquis DeBriac
- Frank Butler as Lord Henry Seville
- Robert Agnew as Albert deMarceau
- Irene Dalton as Alice George
- Majel Coleman as Unknown role
- Anastasia Georgina Kissel as Unknown role (credited as Thais Valdemar)
- Julie Bishop as Child (credited as Jacqueline Wells)

== Preservation ==
As no prints of Bluebeard's 8th Wife have been located in any film archives, it is a lost film.

== External images ==
- Bluebeard's 8th Wife Lobby poster
- Bluebeard's 8th Wife: Scenes and Lobby cards at gettyimages.com
- Bluebeard's 8th Wife Lobby card and still at gswanson.weebly.com
- Bluebeard's 8th Wife Lobby card at emovieposter.com
- PARAMOUNT 1923-24 campaign book 1923 Bluebeard's 8th Wife, Covered Wagon, Hollywood at emovieposter.com
- Catalogue of Copyright Entries: Pamphlets, leaflets, contributions to newspapers or periodicals, etc.; lectures, sermons, addresses for oral delivery; dramatic compositions; maps; motion pictures. U.S. Government Printing Office. July 1923. p. 25916. "'Bluebeard's 8th Wife' press sheet A.710633"
- Bluebeard's 8th Wife press sheet A.710633 at tile.loc.gov
