= Ladies' Night in a Turkish Bath =

1928 American film by Edward F. Cline

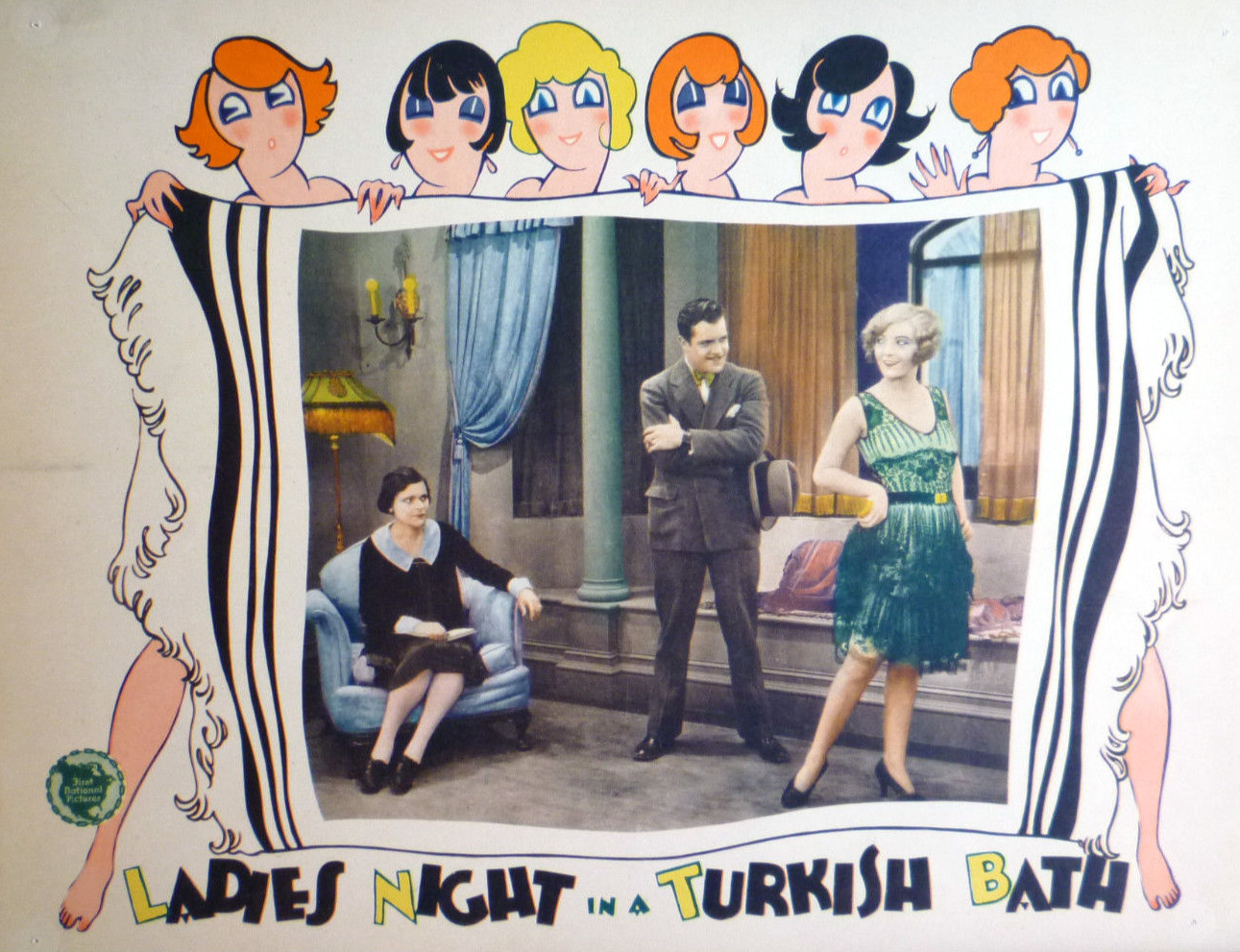
- Lobby card
- Directed by: Edward F. Cline
- Written by: Henry McCarty; Gene Towne; Al Boasberg (titles)
- Based on: Ladies' Night by Charlton Andrews and Avery Hopwood
- Produced by: Edward Small; Charles R. Rogers
- Starring: Dorothy Mackaill; Jack Mulhall
- Cinematography: Jack MacKenzie
- Edited by: Edgar Adams
- Production company: Asher-Small-Rogers
- Distributed by: First National Pictures
- Release date: April 1, 1928
- Running time: 7 reels
- Country: United States
- Language: Sound (Synchronized) (English intertitles)

Ladies' Night in a Turkish Bath is a 1928 American synchronized sound film. While the film has no audible dialog, it was released with a synchronized musical score with sound effects using a short-lived sound-on-film Movietone process developed by First National Pictures. The film is important historically as the first sound feature to be released by First National. It is a comedy film, directed by Edward F. Cline, based on the 1920 play Ladies' Night by Charlton Andrews and Avery Hopwood. It was released on April 1, 1928 by First National Pictures.

== Plot ==
Speed Dawson and his buddy Sweeney are steelworkers who look down on the everyday world beneath their towering jobs, and even more so on women—especially the flashy flapper types. Speed is cocky and dismissive about love, claiming no girl could ever change him. Sweeney warns him he's headed for a fall.

That fall comes in the form of Helen Slocum, a spirited and snappy-tongued sidewalk box-lunch vendor for her family's home-cooked lunch business, "Eat with Ma and Pa". When Speed cuts in line during a busy lunch rush, Helen puts him in his place. Angered but intrigued, Speed tries to avoid her, but she tricks him into buying one of her lunches—and he's surprised to find it delicious.

Intrigued, Speed keeps returning for more than food, and a romance begins to bloom. Trouble starts when Edwin Leroy, a self-absorbed physical instructor and neighbor, also starts pursuing Helen with his oily charm and good looks. Sweeney is annoyed by Speed's growing attachment and plays practical jokes, one of which results in Speed being thrown out of the Slocum home by Pa Slocum on his first visit.

Despite the setback, Speed and Helen patch things up, and he proposes to her on the same night that Pa Slocum sells the "Eat with Ma and Pa" trademark to a large food company. With their newfound fortune, the Slocums move into a white-collar neighborhood. This shift brings conflict: Helen begins adopting flapper fashion—bare legs, short skirts—and Speed is dismayed. Worse, Leroy now lives across the street and continues courting Helen with the encouragement of her mother, Ma Slocum, who is also influenced by the fashionable and calorie-counting Mrs. Spivens, Leroy's aunt.

Mrs. Slocum, now obsessed with dieting, empties the pantry and begins tormenting her husband with health kicks. This misery bonds Speed and Pa Slocum, both feeling displaced in their own homes.

The situation worsens when Helen appears one night in a revealing evening gown. Speed chastises her for dressing like a flapper and keeping company with Leroy. They argue bitterly. When Helen drives off with Leroy, Speed is left humiliated. Meanwhile, Mrs. Slocum forces Helen to prepare for a visit to the Turkish bath, part of her latest slimming routine encouraged by Leroy.

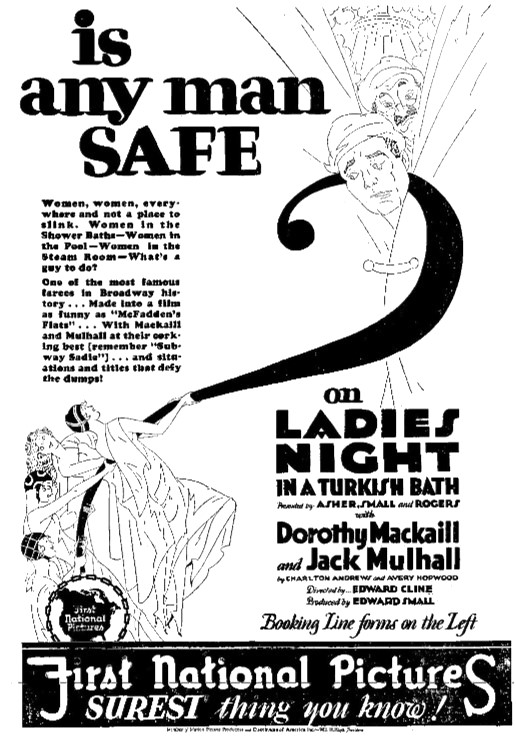
An advertisement for Ladies' Night in a Turkish Bath in the February 1, 1928, edition of Variety.

At work the next day, Pa Slocum visits Speed on the steel framework and brings lunch. Although it's wedding anniversary, Slocum is miserable. Speed offers some tough love, reminding him to take charge at home. Revived, Slocum plans a surprise dinner that night and convinces Speed to come too.

Back at the Slocum apartment, Leroy is making plans for the Turkish bath visit and promises to pick Helen up at 11. He leaves just before Speed arrives. Helen greets Speed warmly but guardedly, while Mrs. Slocum remains cold. When Pa Slocum unveils the anniversary dinner he secretly prepared, his wife refuses to eat. Speed supports Slocum in insisting she join, but when Mrs. Slocum tries to leave, Speed intervenes—only to be slapped by Helen for yelling at her mother. A blow-up follows. Mrs. Slocum hurls Helen's engagement ring at Speed. Pa Slocum grabs his hat and follows him out, furious.

Helen, heartbroken, is ordered by her mother to get ready for the Turkish bath. Pa Slocum, thinking she's leaving him for good, is crushed. That's when Mr. Spivens, Leroy's uncle and another diet victim, invites Slocum to a raucous "smoker" upstairs behind closed doors—a racy escape from his domestic gloom. Meanwhile, Sweeney, trying to cheer up Speed, takes him to the same questionable gathering.

At the party, Speed finds Slocum and scolds him—just as the place is raided by the police. While Sweeney holds off the cops (and is arrested), Speed and Slocum escape through a window onto an adjacent steel structure—which happens to connect to the Turkish bath.

They sneak into the Turkish bath, where farcical chaos ensues. Through wild circumstances, mistaken identities, and locker room blunders, the truth about Leroy is revealed—he's a cad, using both Helen and her mother. Helen and Speed reconcile, as do the Slocums.

By the end, the dress code is settled, the diet dilemma resolved, Leroy is thoroughly discredited, and love wins out.

== Cast ==
- Dorothy Mackaill as Helen Slocum
- Jack Mulhall as "Speed" Dawson
- Sylvia Ashton as Ma Slocum
- James Finlayson as Pa Slocum
- Guinn "Big Boy" Williams as Sweeney
- Harvey Clark as Mr. Spivens
- Reed Howes as Edwin Leroy
- Ethel Wales as Mrs. Spivens
- Fred Kelsey as Detective
- Andreva Nunée as Dancer (uncredited)
- Fred Toones as Barbershop Attendant (uncredited)

== Music ==
The theme song was entitled "Girl of My Dreams", with lyrics and music by Sunny Clapp.

== Preservation ==
A copy of Ladies' Night in a Turkish Bath is housed at the UCLA Film & Television Archive.

== See also ==
- List of early sound feature films (1926–1929)
