= Bluebeard's Eighth Wife =

1938 film by Ernst Lubitsch

- Theatrical release poster
- Directed by: Ernst Lubitsch
- Screenplay by: Charles Brackett; Billy Wilder
- Based on: La huitième femme de Barbe-Bleue (1921 play) by Alfred Savoir; Bluebeard's Eighth Wife (1921 English play) by Charlton Andrews
- Produced by: Ernst Lubitsch
- Starring: Claudette Colbert; Gary Cooper; Edward Everett Horton; David Niven; Elizabeth Patterson; Herman Bing
- Cinematography: Leo Tover
- Edited by: William Shea
- Music by: Frederick Hollander; Werner Heymann
- Production company: Paramount Pictures
- Distributed by: Paramount Pictures
- Release date: March 23, 1938
- Running time: 80 minutes
- Country: United States
- Language: English
- Budget: Over $1 million

Bluebeard's Eighth Wife is a 1938 American romantic comedy film produced and directed by Ernst Lubitsch and starring Claudette Colbert and Gary Cooper. The film is based on the 1921 French play La huitième femme de Barbe-Bleue by Alfred Savoir and the English translation of the play by Charlton Andrews. The screenplay was the first of many collaborations between Charles Brackett and Billy Wilder. The film is a remake of the 1923 silent version directed by Sam Wood and starring Gloria Swanson.

After Bluebeard's Eighth Wife underperformed at the box office, Paramount Pictures released Lubitsch to go to Metro-Goldwyn-Mayer.

== Plot ==
On the French Riviera, wealthy American businessman Michael Brandon wants to buy pajamas, but just the tops. When the store refuses to sell the pajamas without the pants, an attractive woman named Nicole offers to buy the bottoms. As the two engage in a flirtatious conversation about Michael's insomnia, Nicole recommends that he spell "Czechoslovakia" backwards when he goes to bed to help him fall asleep. Michael then tries to figure out if the pajama bottoms are for a family member or lover.

At his hotel room, Michael's insomnia persists, so the managers offer him a suite on a higher floor, further away from the sounds of the sea. The suite is still occupied by the penniless Marquis de Loiselle, who owes 60,000 francs in unpaid hotel bills. The marquis attempts to make a business proposition to Michael, who refuses. However, when Michael recognizes the marquis' pajama bottoms, he realizes that Nicole is his daughter and, as a gesture of good will, buys a bathtub from him for 60,000 francs that was supposedly once owned by King Louis XIV.

Michael later proposes to Nicole, but she refuses. After he sends her an apology note and an invitation to dinner, they eventually fall in love. At the engagement party, Nicole is horrified to learn that Michael has been married seven times previously. She calls off the wedding, much to her father's dismay. Michael explains that he gives each of his wives a prenuptial agreement guaranteeing $50,000 a year for life if they should divorce. Nicole demands twice that amount, and Michael assents.

During the couple's honeymoon in Czechoslovakia and later at their home in Paris, Nicole keeps her discontented husband at arm's length while they live in separate rooms. He assumes that she is hoping to obtain a divorce, but this only strengthens his natural tenacity and his determination not to grant her one. It is implied that what she actually wants is to keep him interested by frustrating him so that he will not grow tired of her as he did with the previous seven wives. After reading Shakespeare's The Taming of the Shrew, Michael tries to follow Petruchio's example by "taming" his wife, but Nicole proves too strong for him, slapping him back when he slaps her and biting him (then tenderly treating him with iodine) when he spanks her.

Nicole writes anonymous letters to Michael claiming that she has a lover, but Monsieur Pepinard, a private detective hired by Michael, assures him that the claim is false. Nicole then blackmails Pepinard into finding her a fake lover, a boxer named Kid Mulligan, so that Michael can catch her alone with him and get knocked unconscious. Complications ensue when her friend Count Albert De Regnier chooses the wrong time to return a purse that she had left behind and is mistaken for her husband by Kid Mulligan, and gets knocked out. Michael assumes that Albert is her lover and finally grants her a divorce.

Michael has a nervous breakdown and commits himself to a sanitarium. Nicole tries to visit him but is barred from doing so. Michael is placed in a straitjacket after spotting Marquis de Loiselle, who has arranged for Nicole to enter by buying the sanitarium with their new wealth. Nicole tells Michael that she fell in love with him at first sight, but she needed to break him of his habit of marrying so often. Now that she is financially independent, she explains that if they were to remarry, it would not be for his money. He frees himself from his straitjacket, walks toward her menacingly and kisses her.

== Cast ==
- Claudette Colbert as Nicole de Loiselle
- Gary Cooper as Michael Brandon
- Edward Everett Horton as Marquis de Loiselle
- David Niven as Albert De Regnier
- Elizabeth Patterson as Aunt Hedwige
- Herman Bing as Monsieur Pepinard
- Warren Hymer as Kid Mulligan
- Franklin Pangborn as assistant hotel manager
- Armand Cortes as assistant hotel manager
- Rolfe Sedan as floorwalker
- Lawrence Grant as Professor Urganzeff
- Lionel Pape as Monsieur Potin
- Tyler Brooke as clerk
- Leon Ames as ex-chauffeur (uncredited)

== Music ==
- "Lookie, Lookie, Lookie, Here Comes Cookie", lyrics and music by Mack Gordon, sung by Gary Cooper.

== Production ==
After Wilder signed an employment contract with Paramount Pictures in 1936, Manny Wolf, story editor and Paramount writer's department head, teamed him with Charles Brackett. Wolf suggested to Lubitsch that Wilder write Bluebeard's Eighth Wife together with the younger Brackett, influencing Wilder to write more modern than his script for Angel. Under Lubitsch's supervision, Wilder and Brackett spent a year cowriting the screenplay. Filming began on 11 October 1937 and finished in January 1938, costing $1.3 million.

== Reception ==
Critic Frank Nugent of The New York Times wrote that Gary Cooper was badly miscast as the millionaire.

Variety wrote: "It's a light and sometimes bright entertainment, but gets a bit tiresome, despite its comparatively moderate running time.... The Brackett-Wilder scripting is ofttimes bright but illogical and fragile."
