= Meet cute =

Trope in romance and romantic comedy

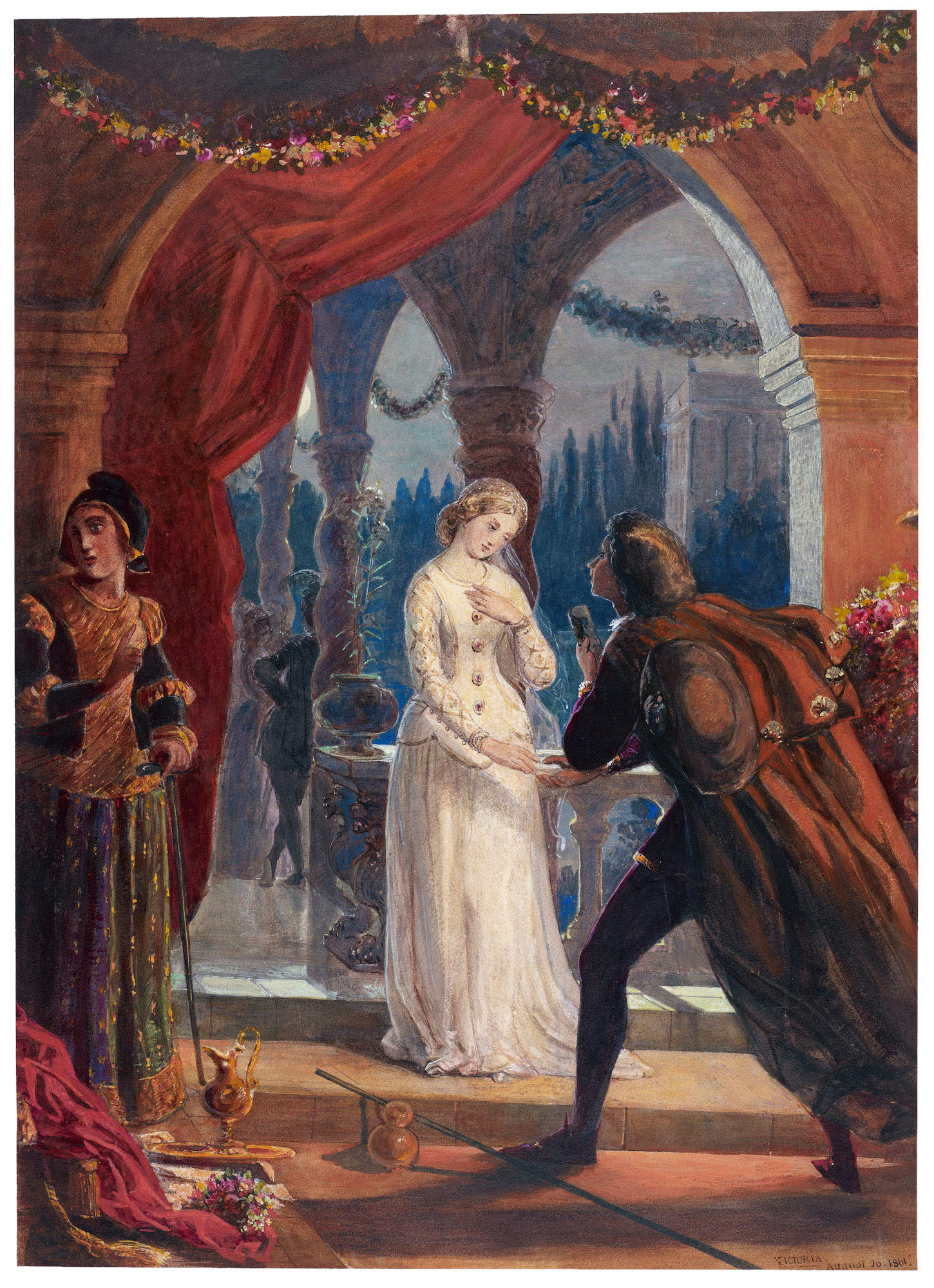
Romeo meets Juliet for the first time, in an 1861 watercolor by Victoria, Princess Royal.

A meet cute is a scene in romantic fiction in which two people meet for the first time, typically under unusual, humorous, or adorable circumstances, and go on to form a future romantic couple.

This type of scene is a staple of romantic comedies, though it can also occur in sitcoms and soap operas. Frequently, the meet cute leads to a humorous clash of personalities or of beliefs, embarrassing situations, or comical misunderstandings that further drive the plot.

== Etymology ==
The origin of the term is unknown but it appears to have been familiarly associated with Hollywood screenwriting by at least 1941. The earliest example given by the Oxford English Dictionary is from Anthony Boucher's mystery novel The Case of the Solid Key (1941), in which a character says "We met cute, as they say in story conferences." As this example implies, the term was already well-known, and in a 1996 The Paris Review interview, screenwriter Billy Wilder, referring to Ernst Lubitsch's 1938 screwball comedy film Bluebeard's Eighth Wife (in which two characters meet while shopping for pajamas, one seeking a pajama top and the other a pajama bottom), says that the concept was "a staple of romantic comedies back then". In George Axelrod's play Will Success Spoil Rock Hunter? (1955), a character explains,

The only important thing to remember is that––in a movie––the boy and the girl must meet in some cute way. They cannot, you understand, just be introduced. Or meet like normal people at, perhaps, a cocktail party or some other social function. No. It is terribly important that they meet cute.

Several reviewers have used the term. Bosley Crowther, in his February 1964 review of Sunday in New York, writes that a character "is conveniently importuned by this attractive young fellow she happens to run into – to 'meet cute', as they say – on a Fifth Avenue bus". Film critics such as Roger Ebert and the Associated Press's Christy Lemire popularized the term in their reviews. In Ebert's DVD commentary for Beyond the Valley of the Dolls, which he co-wrote, he describes the scene where law student Emerson Thorne bumps into the female character Petronella Danforth. Ebert admits that he, as the screenwriter, wrote into the script a "classic Hollywood meet cute". He explains the meet cute as a scene "in which somebody runs into somebody else, and then something falls, and the two people began to talk, and their eyes meet and they realize that they are attracted to one another".
