= Alfred Savoir =

Polish-born French comedy playwright

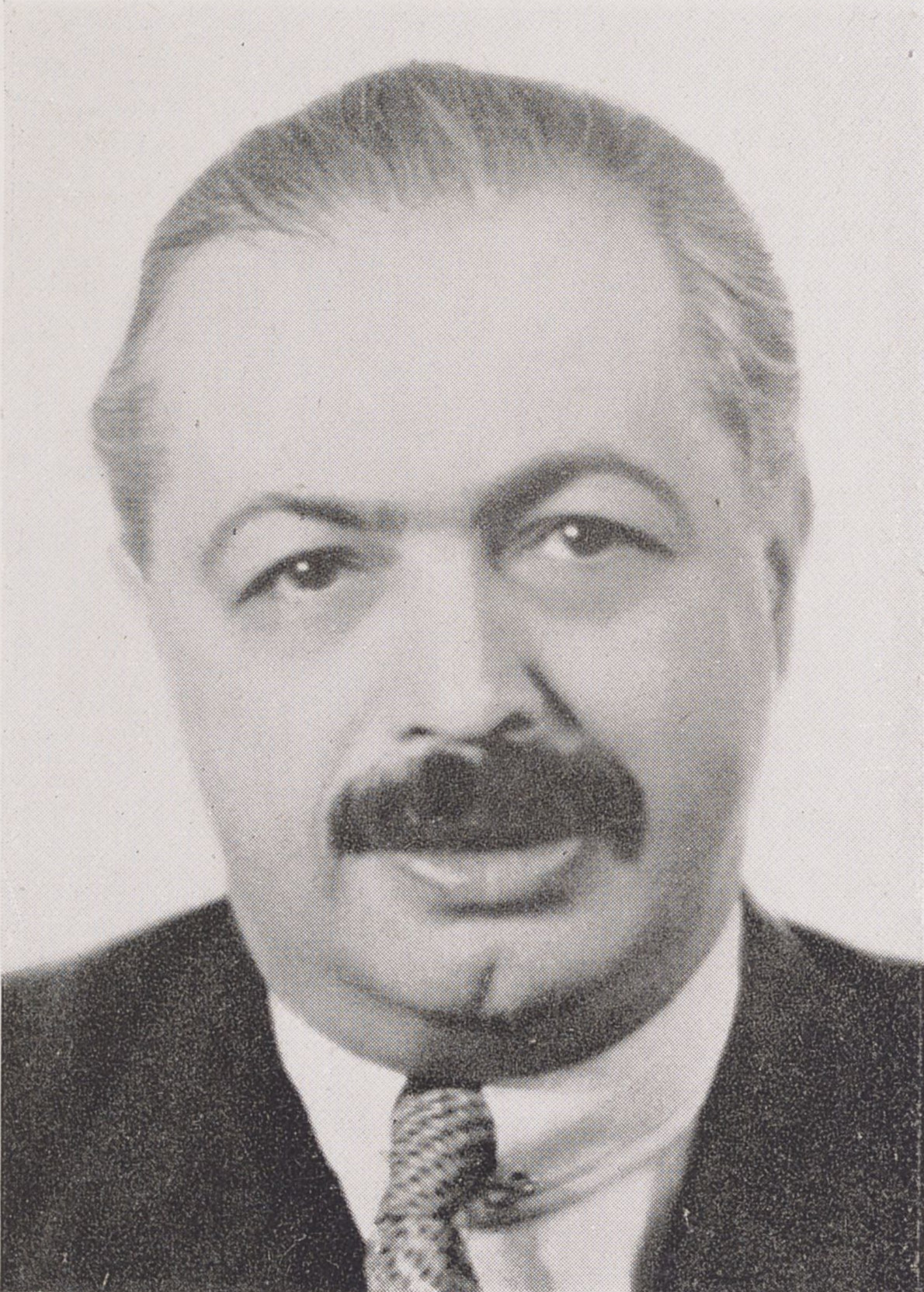
- Alfred Savoir in 1931
- Born: Alfred Poznański; 23 January 1883; Łódź, Congress Poland
- Died: 26 June 1934 (aged 51); Paris, France
- Occupation: Playwright

Signature
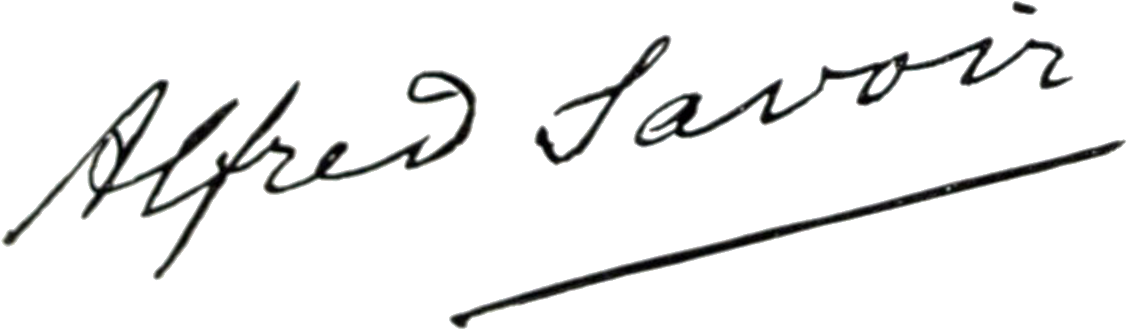

Alfred Poznański (23 January 1883 – 26 June 1934), better known by his alias Alfred Savoir, was a Polish-born French comedy playwright.

== Career ==
Alfred Poznański was born into a Jewish family in the Polish city of Łódź when it was part of the Russian Empire on 23 January 1883. After being educated in a public junior high school in Łódź, he was admitted to the University of Montpellier, where he studied law. On graduating, he settled in Paris.

Poznanski became a playwright, writing in French under the pen name of Alfred Savoir. His plays were mainly staged in France, but some were put on in Poland. His first play to be staged was the comedy Le troisième couvert (the Third cover). His work included sarcastic comedy and vaudeville, but also some serious pieces such as a historical drama about Catherine the Great (La Petite Catherine). He co-founded the weekly magazine "Marianne" and was one of the editors. Poznanski served in the French air force in World War I and was awarded the Legion of Honour for his courage.

Savoir was a rival of Steve Passeur, but had little doubt about his own superior ability. After seeing the first performance of a work by Passeur, he was heard to say, "What an admirable play! I am going to write it." Savoir's plays were called vaudeville idéologique, and he was called "the Bernard Shaw of the Boulevard." His farces took a relaxed attitude towards sex, "an appetite in which man is revealed as funny". This common view among Parisians of the time was disturbing to the more puritan and sentimental Americans.

His play Lui, about a man who thinks he is god, was the basis for the stage play Himself written by Mercedes de Acosta. His 1922 comedy Banco, thought to be daring at the time, was adapted by Clare Kummer and played by Alfred Lunt in Washington and New York with some success. Banco was filmed by Paramount in 1925. His circus farce Der Dompteur (The Lion Tamer) was staged at Berlin's Theater am Schiffbauerdamm in March 1931 with a cast that included Carola Neher, Fritz Kampers, Gustaf Gründgens and Peter Lorre.

Paramount Pictures founded a film production studio at St. Maurice in mid-1930, where they planned to produce all their European films, all of which were multilingual. Savoir succeeded Adolphe Osso as head of production in the French language, with the scripts subject to approval by a committee that included Sacha Guitry and Pierre Benoît.

Alfred Savoir died in Paris on 26 June 1934.

Savoir's play La Huitième Femme de Barbe-Bleue was adapted as the film Bluebeard's Eighth Wife by Charles Brackett and Billy Wilder. The film, directed by Ernst Lubitsch, was released in March 1938. It starred Claudette Colbert and Gary Cooper. The play concerned a man who repeatedly married on the basis that his wife would agree to a divorce and settlement when he had lost interest in her. His eighth wife challenged this arrangement, and eventually obtained a marriage on her own terms. The plot was somewhat controversial in the USA at that time.

== Stage plays ==
- 1906: Le Troisième Coupable, directed by Lugné-Poe
- 1907: Le Baptême, by Alfred Savoir and Fernand Nozière, directed by Lugné-Poe, Théâtre Fémina, 26 November
- 1913: L'Épate, by Alfred Savoir and André Picard, Théâtre Fémina, 25 January
- 1914: Madame, by Abel Hermant and Alfred Savoir, Théâtre de la Porte-Saint-Martin, 10 February
- 1921: La Huitième Femme de Barbe-Bleue, Théâtre de la Potinière, 14 January
- 1921: Ce que femme veut, by Alfred Savoir and Étienne Rey, Théâtre des Mathurins
- 1922: Banco, Théâtre de la Potinière
- 1923: La Couturière de Lunéville, Théâtre du Vaudeville, Théâtre Femina
- 1924: Banco, Théâtre des Variétés
- 1924: La Grande Duchesse et le garçon d'étage, directed by Charlotte Lysès, Théâtre de l'Avenue
- 1924: La Sonate à Kreutzer, by Fernand Nozière and Alfred Savoir, Maison de l'Œuvre
- 1926: Le Figurant de la Gaîté
- 1926: Le Dompteur ou l'anglais tel qu'on le mange, staged by Gaston Baty, Théâtre Michel
- 1927: Passy 08-45, Théâtre de la Potinière
- 1927: Les Deux Amis, staged by Lugné-Poe, Théâtre de l'Œuvre
- 1929: Banco, staged by Jules Berry, Théâtre de la Potinière
- 1929: Chez les Chiens, Théâtre de la Potinière
- 1930: La Petite Catherine, directed by René Rocher, Théâtre Antoine
- 1932: La Pâtissière du village ou Madeleine, directed by Louis Jouvet, Théâtre Pigalle
- 1932: La Margrave, directed by Louis Jouvet, Comédie des Champs-Élysées
- 1932: Maria, Théâtre des Ambassadeurs, 26/10
- 1932: Banco, Théâtre Marigny
- 1933: La Voie lactée, comedy in 3 acts, directed by Harry Baur, Théâtre des Mathurins
- 1949: Le Figurant de la Gaîté, Théâtre Montparnasse
- 1953: La Petite Catherine, in two acts, directed by Christian-Gérard, Théâtre des Bouffes Parisiens

== Adaptations ==
- 1910: The Kreutzer Sonata, by Fernand Nozière and Alfred Savoir after Tolstoy, directed by Lugné-Poe, Theatre Femina
- 1911: The Eternal Husband, by Fernand Nozière and Alfred Savoir after Fyodor Dostoyevsky, Théâtre Antoine

== Filmography ==
- Bluebeard's 8th Wife, directed by Sam Wood (1923, based on the play La Huitième Femme de Barbe-Bleue)
- Lost: A Wife, directed by William C. deMille (1925, based on the play Banco)
- The Grand Duchess and the Waiter, directed by Malcolm St. Clair (1926, based on the play La Grande Duchesse et le garçon d'étage)
- His Tiger Lady, directed by Hobart Henley (1928, based on the play Le Figurant de la Gaîté)
- The Dressmaker of Luneville, directed by Harry Lachman (France, 1932, based on the play La Couturière de Lunéville)
- The King of Paris, directed by Jack Raymond (UK, 1934, based on the play La Voie lactée)
- Ladies Should Listen, directed by Frank Tuttle (1934, based on the play Passy 08-45)
- Here is My Heart, directed by Frank Tuttle (1934, based on the play La Grande Duchesse et le garçon d'étage)
- Dressed to Thrill, directed by Harry Lachman (1935, based on the play La Couturière de Lunéville)
- Bluebeard's Eighth Wife, directed by Ernst Lubitsch (1938, based on the play La Huitième Femme de Barbe-Bleue)

=== Screenwriter ===
- Time to Love, directed by Frank Tuttle (1927)
