= North Dakota State University District =

Historic district in North Dakota, United States

- U.S. National Register of Historic Places
- U.S. Historic district
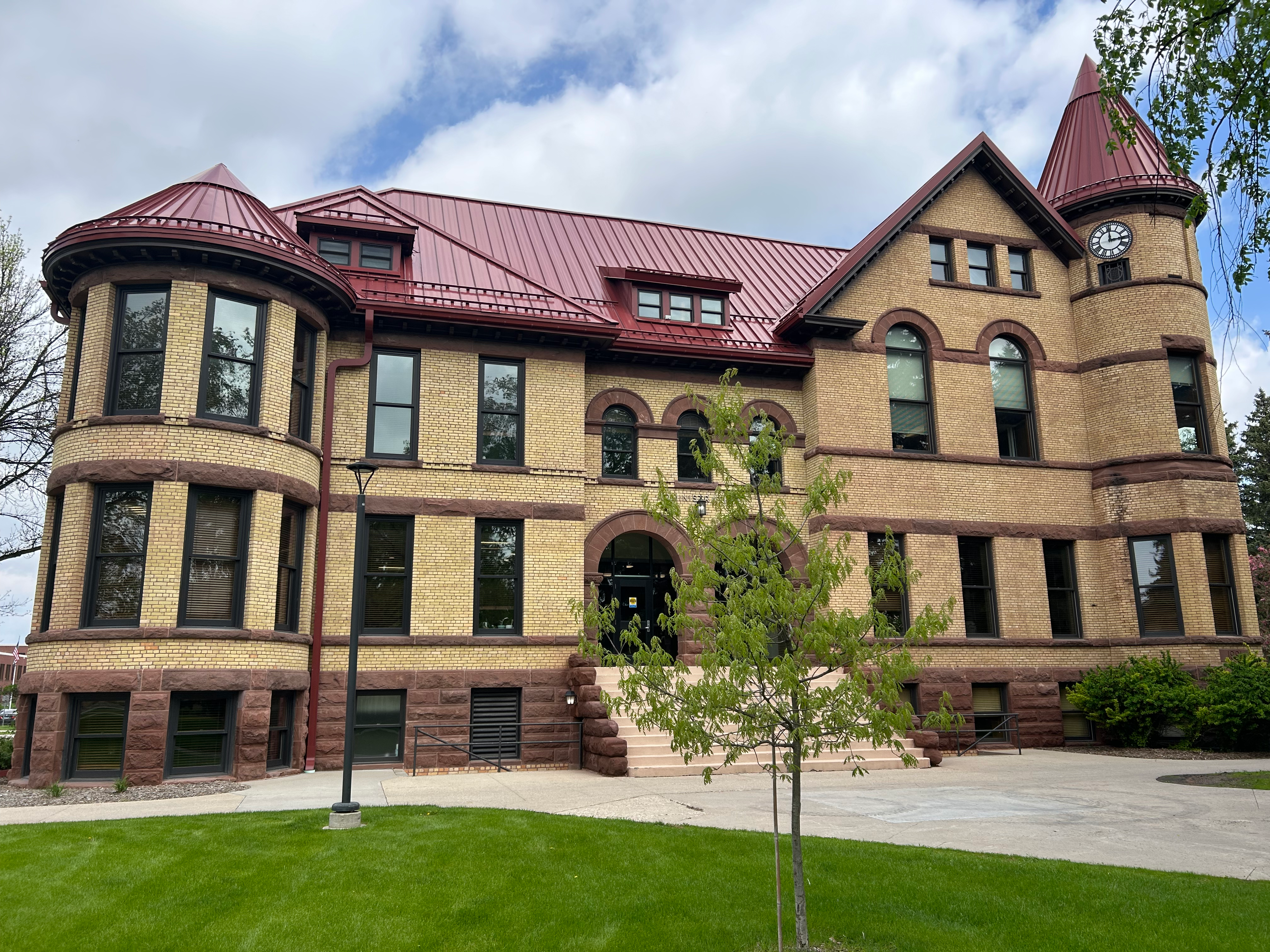
- Old Main

- Location within North Dakota Location within the United States
- Location: Roughly bounded by N. University Dr., Twelfth Ave. N, Service Dr., and Campus Ave., Fargo, North Dakota
- Coordinates: 46°53′34″N 96°48′0″W
- Area: 36 acres (15 ha)
- Architect: Multiple
- Architectural style: Late 19th and 20th Century Revivals, Moderne, Late Victorian
- NRHP reference No.: 86003261
- Added to NRHP: October 6, 1986

North Dakota State University District is a 36-acre (15 ha) historic district on the campus of North Dakota State University, in Fargo, North Dakota, that was listed on the National Register of Historic Places in 1986.

Also known as North Dakota Agricultural College, it was built in Late 19th and 20th Century Revivals, Moderne, and Late Victorian architectural styles.

The listing included 12 contributing buildings, one contributing structure, and one contributing object.

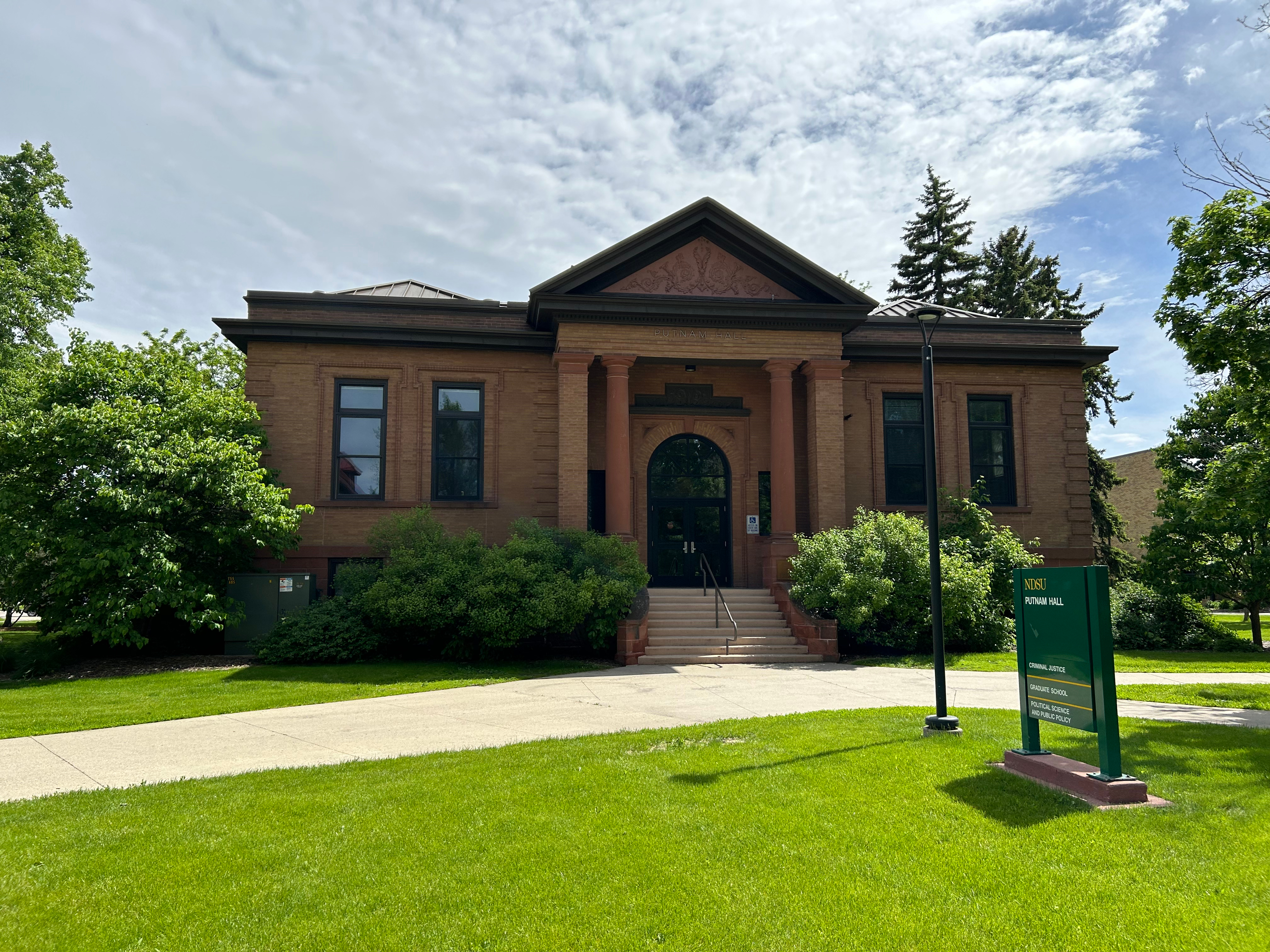
Putnam Hall on the NDSU campus.

Important contributing buildings include:

- Old Main (College Hall), a Richardsonian Romanesque building built in 1891
- Mechanic Arts building, built in 1893; torn down in 1993.
- Minard Hall (Science Hall), built 1901
- Putnam Hall (Carnegie Library), built 1904
- South Engineering, built 1907
- Ceres Hall, built 1910.

== See also ==
- University of North Dakota Historic District, in Grand Forks, also NRHP-listed
- Valley City State University Historic District, in Valley City, also NRHP-listed
