= Irene Dalton =

American actress (1901–1934)

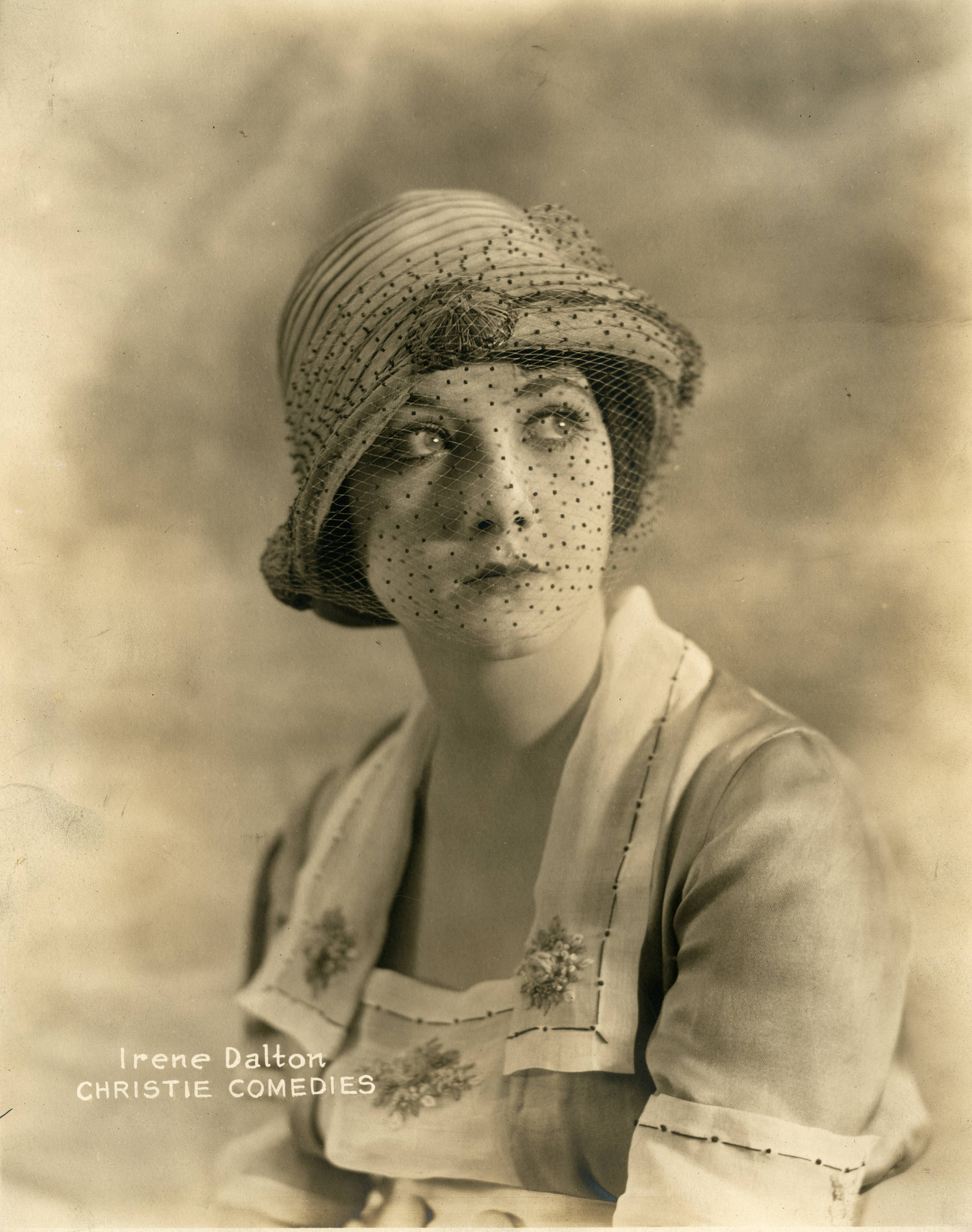
- Dalton in 1921
- Born: September 1, 1901; Chicago, Illinois, U.S.
- Died: August 15, 1934 (aged 32); Chicago, Illinois, U.S.
- Resting place: Mount Carmel Cemetery, Hillside, Illinois
- Occupation: Actress
- Years active: 1920–1923
- Spouse: Lloyd Hamilton (m. 1927; div. 1929)

Irene Dalton (September 1, 1901 – August 15, 1934) was an American silent film actress.

== Biography ==
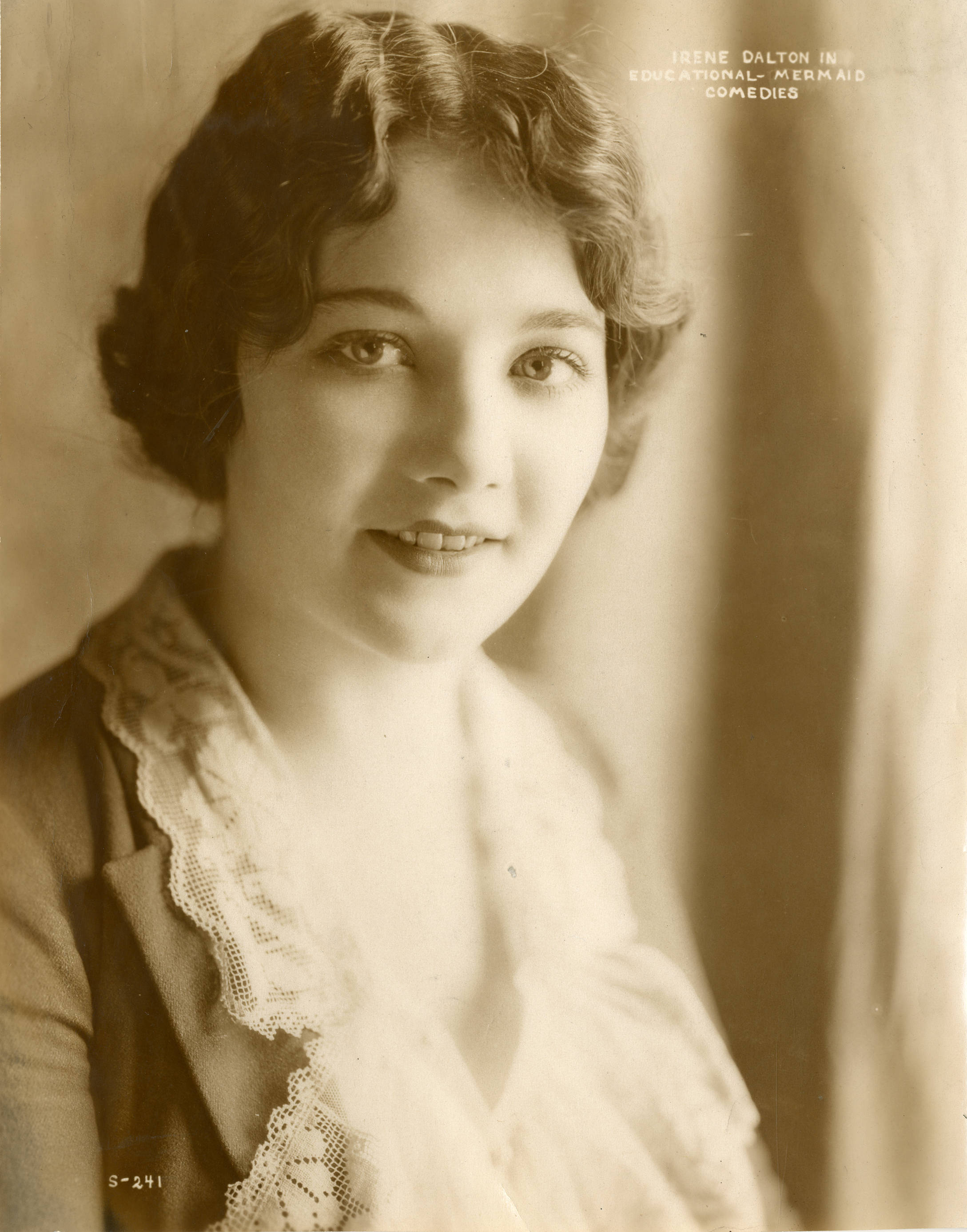
Dalton in 1922

Irene Dalton was born on September 10, 1899, in Chicago, Illinois. After graduating from high school she started working as a stenographer. She got her first acting job when she answered an ad in a local newspaper. Dalton came to prominence in motion pictures through her appearances in Christie comedies produced by Charles Christie.

She costarred with Earl Rodney in Three Jokers and with Laura La Plante in His Four Fathers. She was Lloyd Hamilton's leading lady in numerous comedies including The Vagrant, Rolling Stones, and Poor Boy. In 1923 she had a supporting roles in the films Children of Jazz and Bluebeard's 8th Wife.

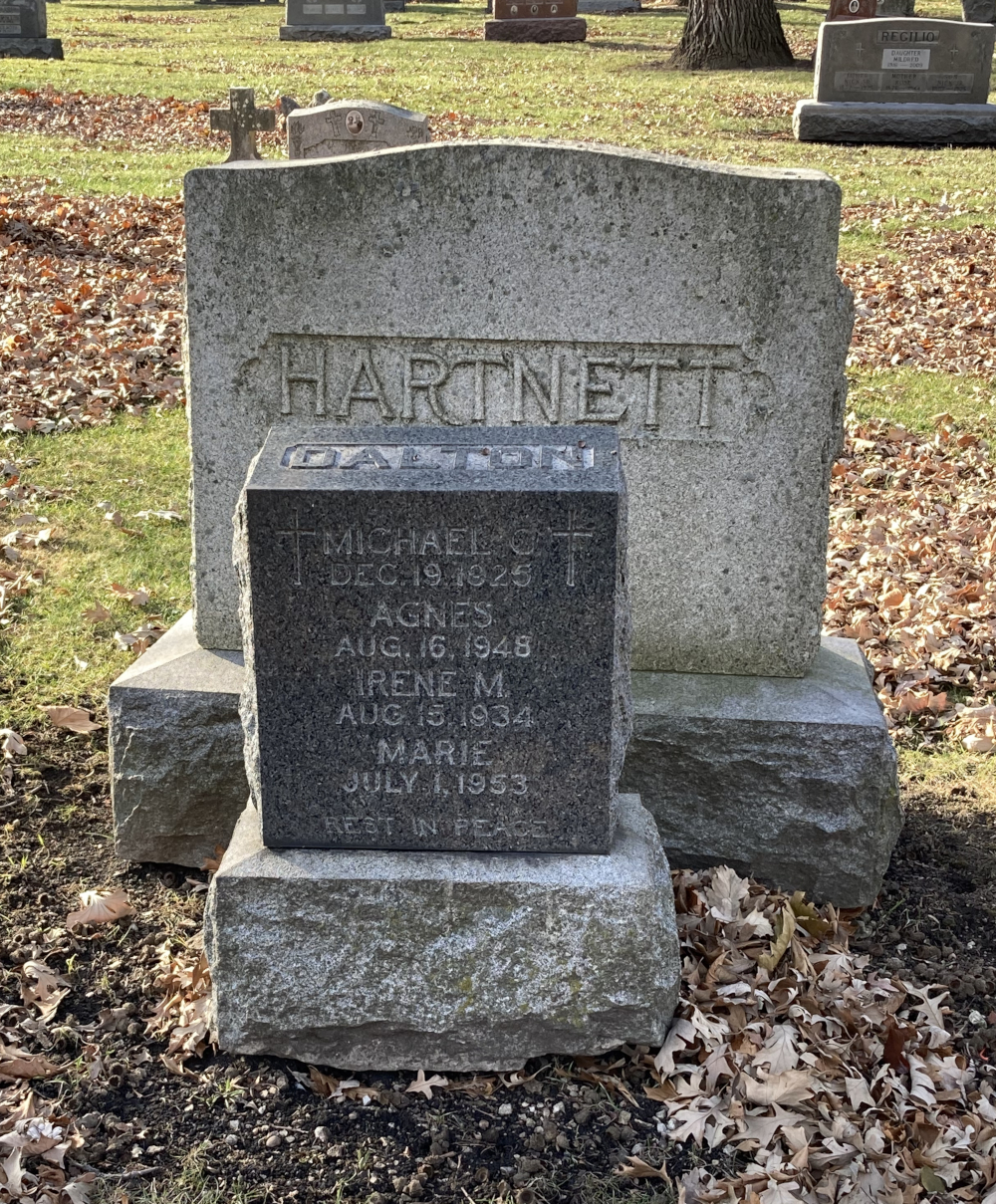
Dalton's grave at Mount Carmel Cemetery

Dalton had an affair with businessman John Raymond Owens, a married millionaire sportsman and son of Michael Joseph Owens, the millionaire inventor of the Owens Bottle Machine. When his wife filed for divorce, she named Dalton as the other woman. Owens and Dalton were both arrested in October 1924 and charged with violating the Mann Act. They were accused of crossing state lines for illicit fornication. Dalton claimed they were both innocent and the charges were eventually dropped.

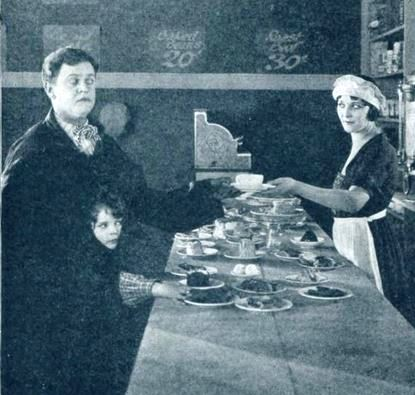
Lloyd Hamilton, Dalton, and child actor Robert DeVilbiss in Rolling Stones (1922)

Dalton married Lloyd Hamilton on June 18, 1927, in Santa Ana, California. They were divorced on April 11, 1929.

Dalton died suddenly in 1934 at the age of 32. She was buried in Mount Carmel Cemetery in Hillside, Illinois.

== Partial filmography ==
- Three Jokers (1921)
- Take Your Time (1921)
- Spooners (1921)
- Children of Jazz (1923)
- Bluebeard's 8th Wife (1923)
