= Ladies' Night (play) =

1920 comedy play

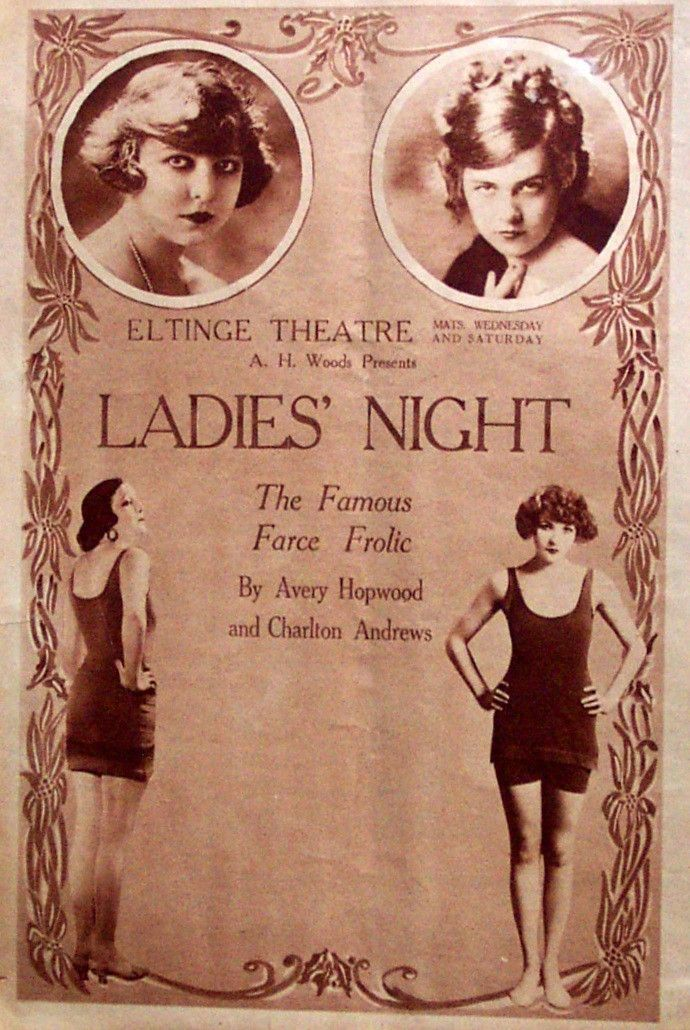
- Advertisement for the Broadway production
- Written by: Charlton Andrews, Avery Hopwood
- Original language: English
- Genre: Farce

Premiere
- Date premiered: August 9, 1920
- Place premiered: Eltinge 42nd Street Theatre

Ladies' Night (sometimes marketed as Ladies' Night in a Turkish Bath) is a three-act play originally written by Charlton Andrews and later reworked by Avery Hopwood. The play was a sex farce with part of the action set in a Turkish bath instead of a bedroom. A. H. Woods staged it on Broadway, where it opened under the direction of Bertram Harrison on August 9, 1920 at the Eltinge 42nd Street Theatre. Ladies' Night had a run of 375 performances with the final curtain falling in June 1921. It was revived on Broadway in adapted forms in 1945 and 1950.

== Plot ==
Jimmy Walters is a married man who avoids many social events because of his strong reaction to women who wear modern fashions that expose their bodies. His wife, Dulcy, is annoyed by his behavior. Their friends – the couples Alicia and Fred, and Mimi and Cort – make fun of him. Fred and Cort believe they can cure his anxieties by taking him to a masquerade ball where he will see many women in scanty attire. On the same evening, Alicia and Mimi will take Dulcy to the Larchmont Baths, which is hosting a ladies night event for women only. (Note: Although described in the script as a "Turkish bath", the term was used to refer to a modern spa rather than a traditional Turkish bath.)

The second act begins with the group of men dressed in drag for the masquerade, which has been raided by the police. They flee through the first open window they find, which puts them inside the Larchmont Baths. The men pretend to be women to avoid being discovered, a pretense that is made more difficult by Jimmy's reactions to the many barely-clothed women in the baths. In the final act, the couples return to the Walters' apartment, where the men must explain their presence in the baths. As a result of his adventure, Jimmy is cured of his exaggerated response to women's bodies.

== Cast ==
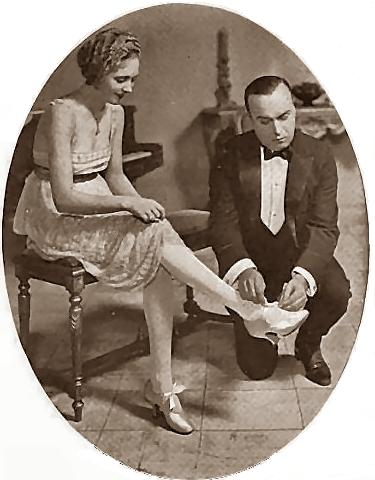
Ladies' Night scene with Evelyn Gosnell and John Cumberland

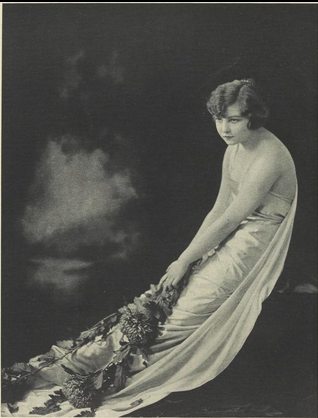
Allyn King played one of the bathhouse customers on Broadway

The characters and cast from the Broadway production are given below:

Cast of the Broadway production
Character	Broadway cast
Helen Barnes	Tillie
John Cumberland	Jimmy Walters
Eleanor Dawn	Miss Murphy
Vincent Dennie	Bob Stanhope
Edward Douglas	Cort Craymer
Nellie Filmore	Lollie
Claiborne Foster	Dulcy Walters
Evelyn Gosnell	Mimi Tarlton
Pearl Jardinere	Mrs. Green
Grace Kaber	Josie
Allyn King	Alicia Bonner
Eda Ann Luke	Babette
Julia Ralph	A Policewoman
Mrs. Stuart Robson	Mrs. Shultz
Adele Rolland	Suzon
Charles Ruggles	Fred Bonner
Fred Sutton	A Fireman
Judith Vosselli	Rhoda Begova

== Reception ==
The Broadway production received negative reviews from many critics. In a review for The New York Times, Alexander Woollcott called the play "a somewhat laborious farce" that the manager and playwrights intended to explore "how far they can go without being arrested". In Theatre Magazine, Arthur Hornblow called the play "hackneyed" and not worthy of the authors' talents. A review in The Forum said the material "often approaches the obscene. However, it is ridiculously funny, and one cannot help but laugh."

== Adaptations ==
Edward F. Cline directed the 1928 silent film Ladies' Night in a Turkish Bath based on the play.

A version of the play revised by Cyrus Wood was staged under the title Good Night Ladies on Broadway, where it opened at the Royale Theatre on January 17, 1945.

An adaption entitled Ladies' Night at the Turkish Bath was produced by George W. Brandt in 1950. The play was shortened to under an hour and presented five times a day before showings of the unrelated adventure film Jungle Jim. The production opened on February 17 at the Selwyn Theater and closed on March 11.
