= University of North Dakota Historic District =

Historic district in North Dakota, United States

- U.S. National Register of Historic Places
- U.S. Historic district
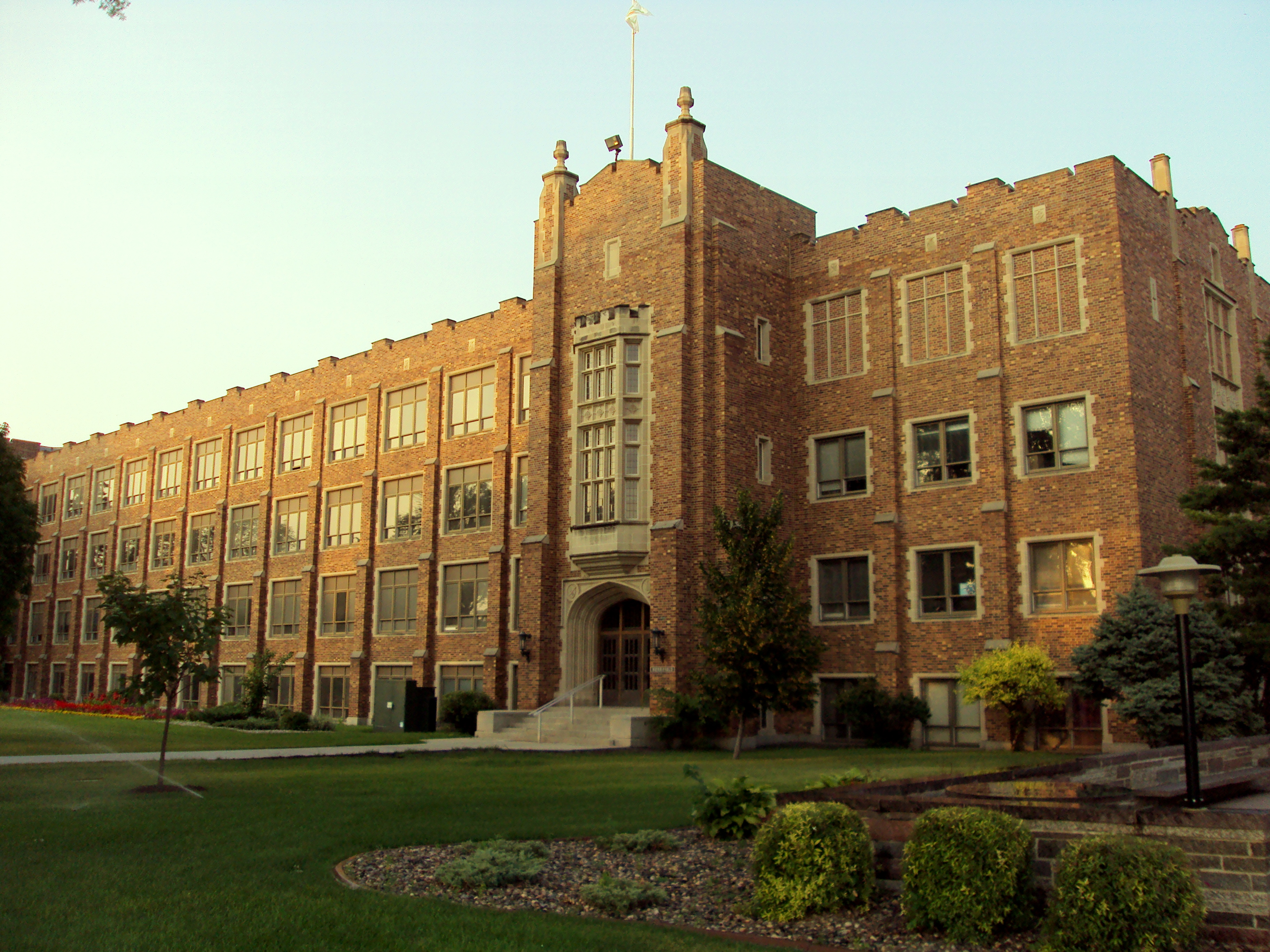
- Merrifield Hall

- Location within North Dakota Location within the United States
- Location: University of North Dakota, Grand Forks, North Dakota
- Coordinates: 47°55′21″N 97°4′14″W
- Area: 127 acres (51 ha)
- Built: 1883, 1922 and 1949
- Architect: Joseph Bell DeRemer; et al.
- Architectural style: Late 19th and 20th Century Revivals
- NRHP reference No.: 08001233
- Added to NRHP: January 13, 2010

The University of North Dakota Historic District is a 127-acre (51 ha) area in Grand Forks, North Dakota that was listed as a historic district in the National Register of Historic Places on January 13, 2010.

The district is located on the University of North Dakota campus and neighboring streets. It includes 56 contributing properties. The area also includes 17 non-contributing buildings and three non-contributing structures.

While it is considered to retain a cohesive design, the district demonstrates changes in education from the 1880s, when the campus was first built, through the years after World War II. The district has dates of significance in 1883, 1922, and 1949. Some work within the area was designed by architect Joseph Bell DeRemer. The district includes Late 19th and 20th Century Revivals architecture.

== See also ==
- North Dakota State University District, in Fargo, also NRHP-listed
- Valley City State University Historic District, in Valley City, also NRHP-listed
