= Théâtre Fémina =

Historical venue in Paris

Coordinates: 48.8711°N 2.3029°E

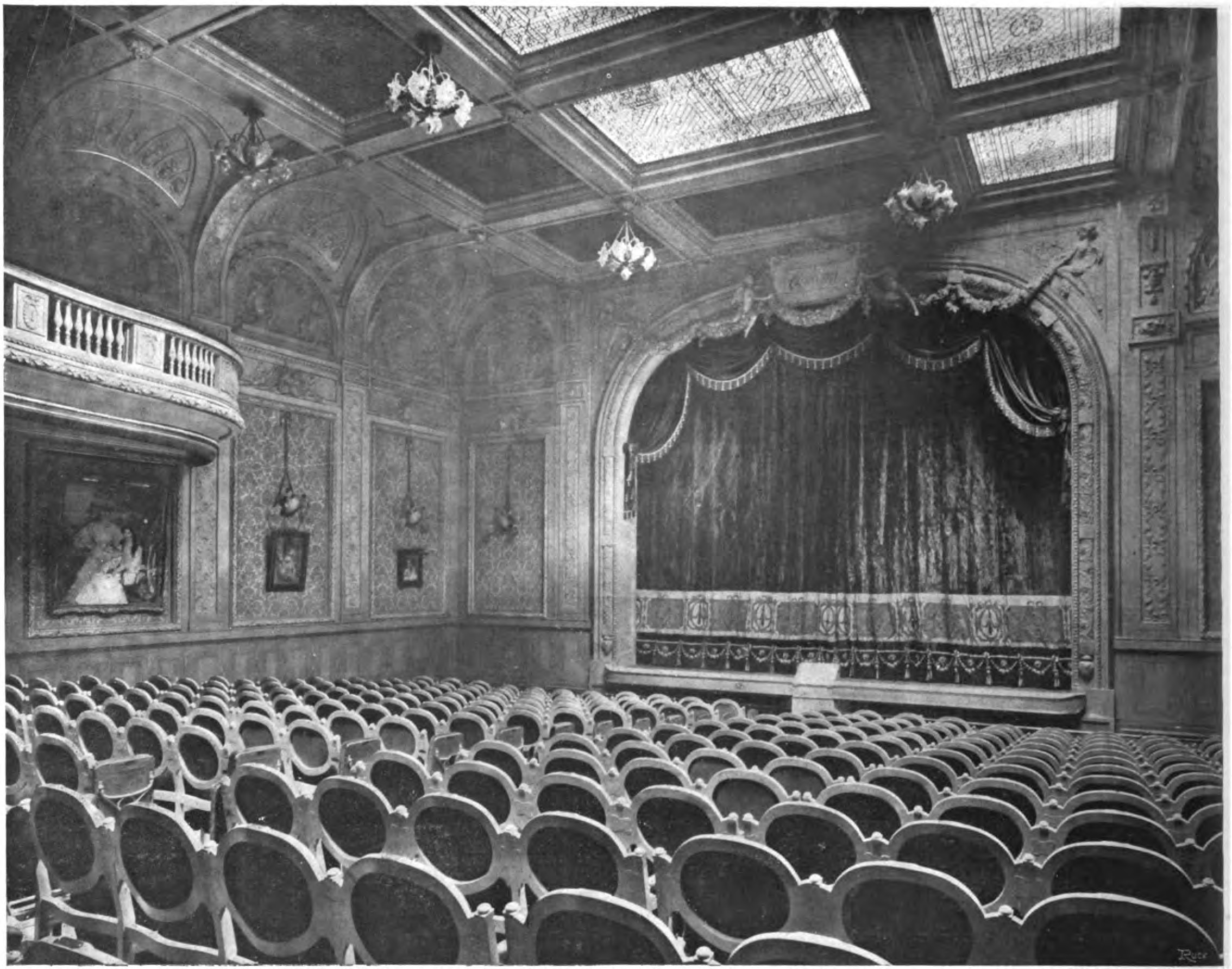
Auditorium and stage of the Théâtre Fémina

The Théâtre Fémina or Salle Fémina was an entertainment venue located at 90 avenue des Champs-Élysées in the 8th arrondissement of Paris. It was inside the Hôtel Fémina, designed by the architect Henri Petit.

== History ==
Based in the building of the publishing company of Pierre Lafitte, owner of the Femina magazine (hence the name), the room was inaugurated on 19 March 1907. Until 1911, it housed Lugné-Poe and his Théâtre de l'Œuvre, before turning towards the light and operetta repertoire. It would close its doors in 1929, after the parent company has been sold in 1916 to 1918 to the Hachette group.

== Direction ==
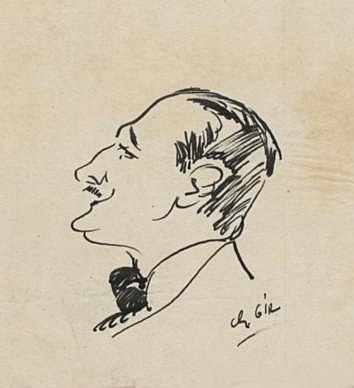
Portrait of André Gailhard by Charles Gir

- André Gailhard
- Lucien Richemont

== Productions ==
- 1907: La Tragédie florentine by Oscar Wilde, directed by Lugné-Poe
- 1907: Philista by Georges Battanchon, directed by Lugné-Poe
- 1907: Le Droit au bonheur by Camille Lemonnier and Pierre Soulaine, directed by Lugné-Poe
- 1907: Un rien de F. Valloton, directed by Lugné-Poe
- 1907: À qui le tour ? by André de Lorde and Jean Marsèle, comedy in 1 act (10 may)
- 1907: Le Baptême by Alfred Savoir and Fernand Nozière, directed by Lugné-Poe, play in 3 acts (26 November)
- 1907: Mendès est dans la salle by Léo Marchès and Clément Vautel, directed by Lugné-Poe
- 1908: Les Jumeaux de Brighton by Tristan Bernard, 3-act play (16 March)
- 1908: L'Invitation à l'amour by Georges Loiseau, 1-act comedy (12 May)
- 1908: Chérubin by Francis de Croisset, comedy in 3 acts (15 May)
- 1908: L'Angoisse by François de Nion, comedy in 3 acts (19 May)
- 1908: L'Engagement by Augustin de Riberolles, comédie de salon (27 May)
- 1908: La Maison en ordre by Arthur Wing Pinero
- 1908: La Loi by Daniel Jourda, directed by Lugné-Poe
- 1908: Vae Victis by Marguerite Duterme, directed by Lugné-Poe
- 1908: Les Amours d'Ovide by André Mouëzy-Éon, directed by Lugné-Poe
- 1908: Elektra by Hugo von Hofmannsthal, directed by Lugné-Poe
- 1908: Le Jeu de la morale et du hasard by Tristan Bernard, directed by Lugné-Poe
- 1908: Le Libertaire by Olivier de Tréville, comedy in 1 act (6 November)
- 1908: Au temps des fées by Jacques Blanchard, one-act play, spectacle du théâtre de l'Œuvre (26 November)
- 1908: Elektra by Hugo von Hofmannsthal (26 November)
- 1908: PLe Tasse by Paul Souchon, drama in 5 acts, 3 December)
- 1908: La Madone by Paul Spaak, directed by Lugné-Poe, 2 acts (8 December)
- 1908: Les Vieux by Pierre Rameil and Frédéric Saisset after Ignasi Iglesias, directed by Lugné-Poe (8 December)
- 1908: La Dame qui n'est plus aux camélias by Maurice de Faramond, directed by Lugné-Poe
- 1909: Perce-Neige et les Sept Gnomes by Jeanne Dortzal after Jacob et Wilhelm Grimm, directed by Lugné-Poe (1 February)
- 1909: L'Étau by André Sardou, play in 3 acts (4 April)
- 1909: La Chaîne by M. Level and J. Monnier, directed by Lugné-Poe
- 1909: Le Fardeau de la liberté by Tristan Bernard, directed by Lugné-Poe
- 1910: Fatalité ! by Charlie d'Allegh and Paul Valdour, one-act play (18 March)
- 1910: Bigre !, revue in 2 acts and 4 tableaux dy Rip and Jacques Bousquet (7 June)
- 1910: La Sonate à Kreutzer by Fernand Nozière and Alfred Savoir after Léon Tolstoï, directed by Lugné-Poe
- 1910: Le Mauvais Grain by Maurice de Faramond, directed by Lugné-Poe
- 1910: Le Poupard by Jean Bouvelet and Henry Bouvelet, directed by Lugné-Poe
- 1911: Malazarte by Graça Aranha, directed by Lugné-Poe (19 February)
- 1911: Bellone et Cupidon by Martin-Valdour and Charles Gallo, comedy in 1 act (23 February)
- 1911: Impressions d'Afrique, play in 4 acts by Raymond Roussel after his novel (30 September)
- 1911: Mais n'te promène donc pas toute nue ! by Georges Feydeau (25 November)
- 1911: Le Diamant, comedy in 2 acts by Camille Le Senne and Léon Guillot de Saix after Carmonselle
- 1912: Bianca Capello, drama in 4 acts and 8 tableaux by Camille Le Senne and Léon Guillot de Saix (16 February)
- 1912: L'Enjôleuse, comedy in 3 acts by Xavier Roux and Maurice Sergine (10 October)
- 1912: Tu vas un peu fort !, comedy in 1 act by Louis Verneuil (21 November)
- 1913: L'Épate, comedy in 3 acts by Alfred Savoir and André Picard (25 January)
- 1913: Eh ! Eh !, revue in 2 acts by Rip and Jacques Bousquet (5 April)
- 1913: Cœur de femme, comedy in 3 acts by Jean Conti
- 1913: Alsace by Gaston Leroux and Lucien Camille (10 January)
- 1913: Les Travaux d'Hercule, opéra-bouffe in 3 acts by Gaston Arman de Caillavet and Robert de Flers, music by Claude Terrasse
- 1913: Paraphe Ier, comedy in 3 acts by Louis Bénière (22 November)
- 1913: Un jeune homme qui se tue, comedy in 4 acts de Georges Berr (19 December)
- 1914: Nocturne, comedy in 1 act by René Fauchois (3 March)
- 1914: Très moutarde, revue by Rip and Jacques Bousquet (3 April)
- 1914: Don Juan, fantaisie poétique et musicale in 2 tableaux by Isidore de Lara (9 June)
- 1917 : La Légende de France, spectacle au profit du Secours de guerre (21 January)
- 1918: La Fausse Ingénue, operetta in 2 acts by Michel Carré, music by Charles Cuvillier (16 March)
- 1919: Atavisme, drama in 1 act by René Jeanne and Georges de Wissant
- 1919: La Marche à l'étoile, revue in 2 acts by Paul Marinier, Roger Ferréol, Charles-Alexis Carpentier (8 April)
- 1919: Souris d'hôtel, comedy in 4 acts by Marcel Gerbidon and Paul Armont (13 October)
- 1919: Triplepatte, comedy in 5 acts by Tristan Bernard and André Godfernaux (18 December)
- 1920: Mademoiselle ma mère, comedy in 3 acts by Louis Verneuil (24 February)
- 1920: Une faible femme, comedy in 3 acts by Jacques Deval (12 May)
- 1920: Ma femme et son mari, comedy in 3 acts by Lucien Mayrargue and Maxime Carel (6 July)
- 1921: La Chauve-Souris, compagnie théâtrale by Nikita Balieff (March–June)
- 1921: Sin féerie chinoise by Maurice Magre (15 October)
- 1922: Un chien dans un jeu de quilles comedy in 3 acts by André de Fouquières and Raymond Silva (19 January)
- 1922: Le Prince travesti by Marivaux (21 February)
- 1922: Le Reflet, play in 4 acts by Pierre Frondaie (9 June)
- 1922: Annabella, operetta in 3 acts by Maurice Magre, music by Charles Cuvillier (8 November)
- 1923: La Chauve-Souris compagnie théâtrale by Nikita Balieff
- 1923: L'Homme enchaîné, play in 3 acts by Édouard Bourdet (7 novembre)
- 1924: Le Printemps des autres by Jean-Jacques Bernard, directed by Lugné-Poe
- 1925: Troupe Les Macdona Players, plays by Bernard Shaw (January)
- 1925: Le Bel Amour by Edmond Sée, play in 3 acts (2 February)
- 1925: Une femme, comedy in 4 acts by Edmond Guiraud (14 March)
- 1925: Un ménage à la page, comedy in 3 acts by Raoul Praxy (14 July)
- 1925: Troupe de Gregorio Martinez-Sierra (October)
- 1925: L'Homme d'un soir, comedy in 3 acts and 4 tableaux by Denys Amiel and Charles Lafaurie (15 October)
- 1926: L'Absolution by José Germain and Emmanuel Bourcier
- 1926: Une mesure pour rien, esquisse dramatique by Jean-Pierre Liausu (26 June)
- 1927: Angélique, opera ("farce in one act") by Jacques Ibert to a libretto by "Nino", pseudonym of Michel Veber (28 January)
- 1927: Oidipous, tragedy in 5 acts by Raymond Duncan (6 April)
- 1927: L'Eunuque, comedy in 3 acts by Henri Duvernois and André Birabeau
- 1927: L'École de jazz, comedy in 4 acts by Claude Farrère and Dal Médico after Dancing Mothers by Edgar Selwyn and Edmund Goulding (21 October)
- 1928: L'Enfant prodigue, pantomime by Michel Carré (21 May)
- 1928: Neuf, comedy in 4 acts by Lucien Mayrargue (1 September)
- 1928: La Guêpe comedy in 3 acts by Romain Coolus (4 October)
- 1928: The Inca of Perusalem by George Bernard Shaw (29 December)
- 1929: Fragile by André Lang
- 1929: En eau trouble, comedy en 3 acts by André-Marie Gossart and André Richard (February)
- 1929: Trio, comedy in 3 acts by Albert Sablons after the novel by Paul Reboux (22 February)
- 1929: Le roi boit, comedy in 3 acts by Raoul Praxy (25 June)
- 1929: Les Transfuges, play in 4 acts by Alfred Fabre-Luce (22 October)
- 1929: The Road to Rome by Robert Emmett Sherwood (22 November)
- 1929: The Torch Bearers by George Kelly (7 December)
- 1929: The Barker by Kenyon Nicholson (23 December)

== Gallery ==
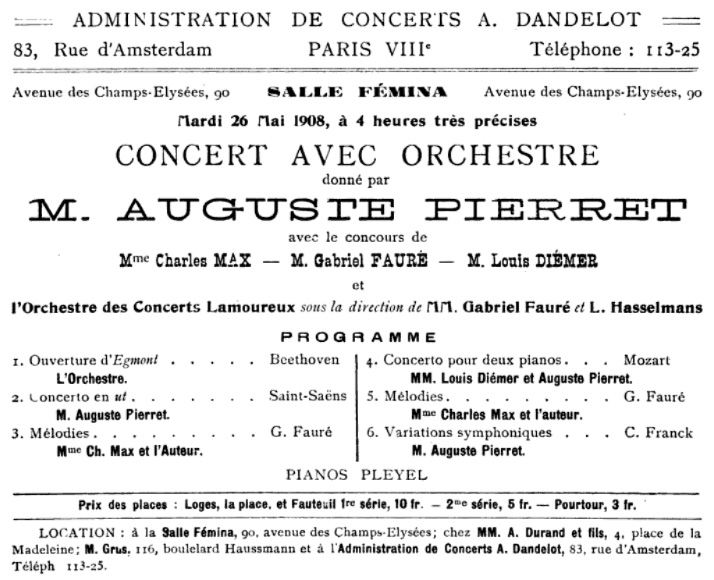
Announcement for the Orchestre des Concerts Lamoureux conducted by Gabriel Fauré and Louis Hasselmans, 1908

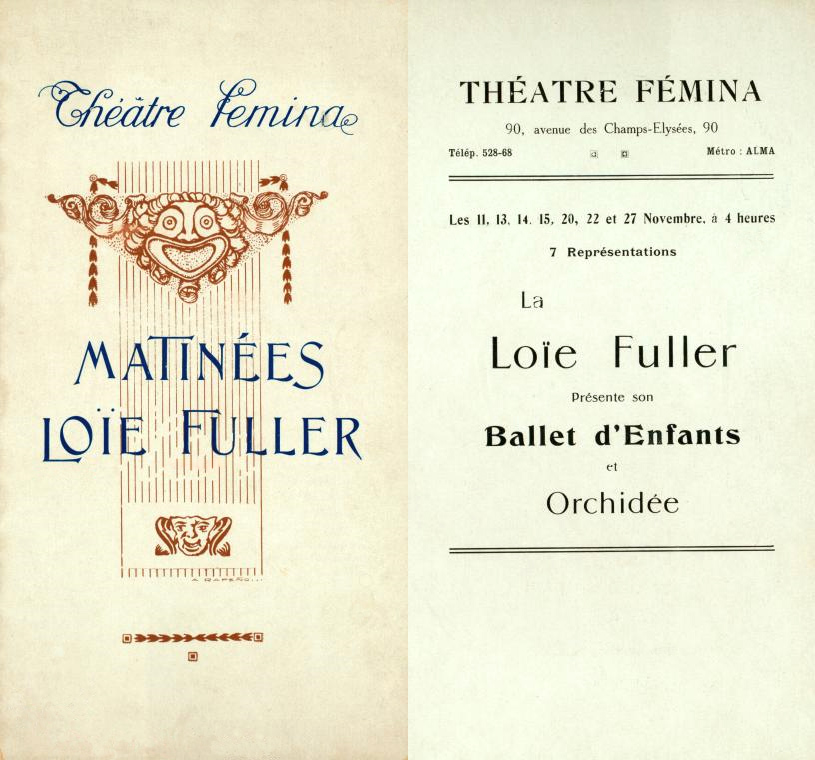
Program for a dance performance by Loie Fuller in 1911

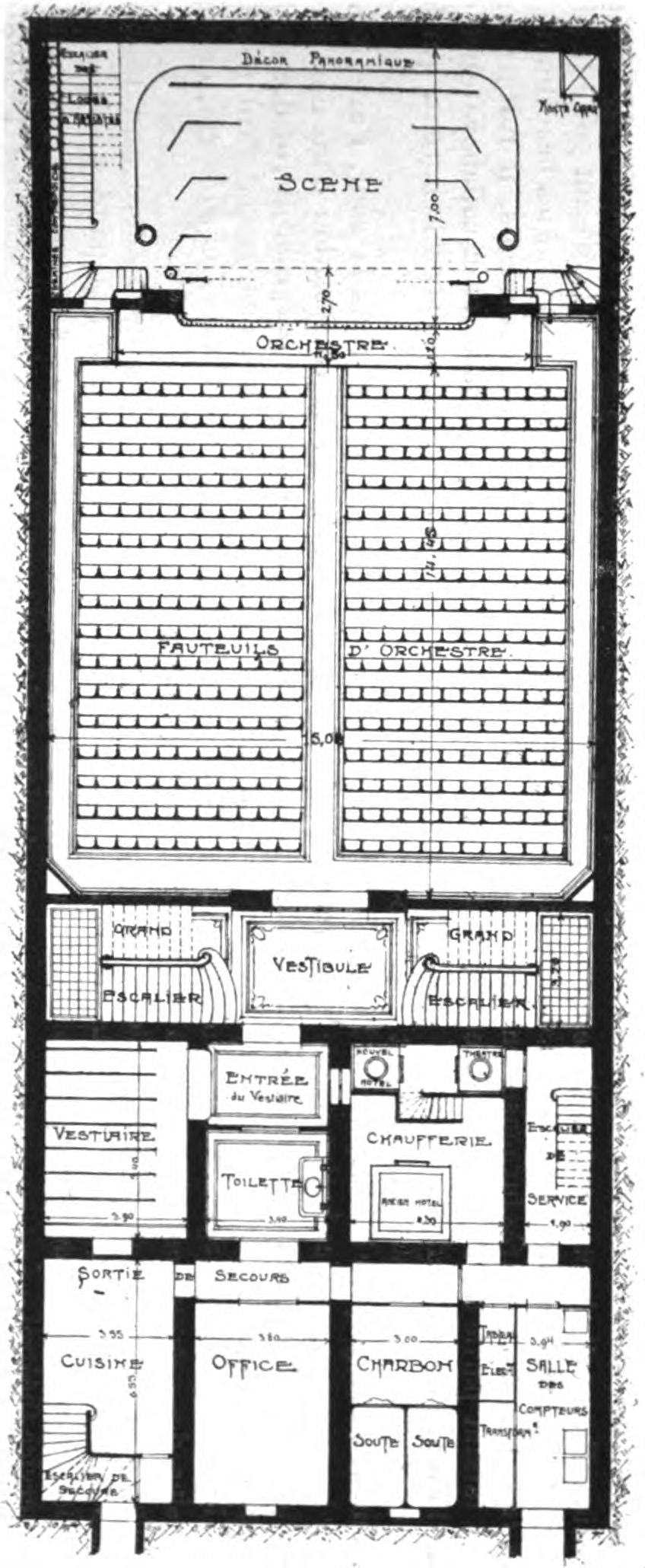
Theatre plan

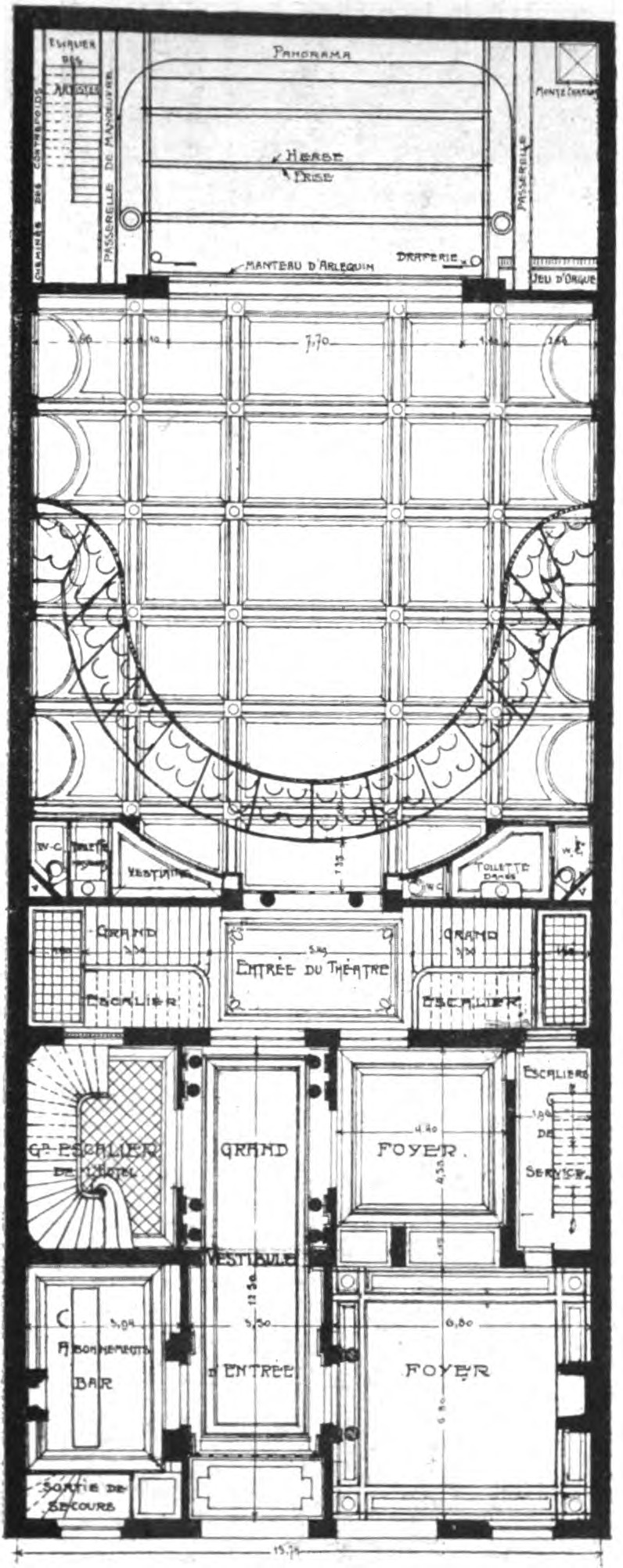
Theatre plan at balcony level

== See also ==
- List of former or demolished entertainment venues in Paris

== Bibliography ==
- Chauveau, Philippe (1999). Les théâtres parisiens disparus, 1402–1986. Paris: Éditions de l'Amandier. ISBN 9782907649308.
- R., A. L. (1907). "Hôtel Fémina aux Champs Élysées", La Construction moderne, vol. 22, no. 39 (29 June 1907), pp. 460–465; no. 40 (6 July 1907), pp. 472–475 and plates 96–100. (at Google Books).
