= Here Is My Heart =

1934 film by Frank Tuttle, Edwin Justus Mayer

- Theatrical release poster
- Directed by: Frank Tuttle
- Screenplay by: Edwin Justus Mayer; Harlan Thompson
- Based on: La Grande-duchesse et le garçon d'étage by Alfred Savoir
- Produced by: Louis D. Lighton
- Starring: Bing Crosby; Kitty Carlisle; Roland Young
- Cinematography: Karl Struss
- Distributed by: Paramount Pictures
- Release date: December 28, 1934 (USA)
- Running time: 77 minutes
- Country: United States
- Language: English

Here Is My Heart is a 1934 American musical comedy film directed by Frank Tuttle and starring Bing Crosby, Kitty Carlisle, and Roland Young. It is based on the play La Grande-duchesse et le garçon d'étage by Alfred Savoir.

== Plot ==
A famous singer pretends to be a penniless waiter to get close to the woman of his dreams, a European princess.

== Cast ==
- Bing Crosby as J. (Jasper) Paul Jones
- Kitty Carlisle as Princess Alexandra
- Roland Young as Prince Nicholas / Nicki
- Alison Skipworth as Countess Rostova
- Reginald Owen as Prince Vladimir / Vova
- William Frawley as James Smith
- Marian Mansfield as Claire
- Cecilia Parker as Suzette, the Maid
- Akim Tamiroff as Manager of Hotel
- Arthur Housman as Drunken Waiter
- Charles Arnt as Higgins, Paul's Valet
- Charles C. Wilson as Captain

== Production ==
Filming commenced in Hollywood at the end of August 1934 and was completed early in November.

== Reception ==
The critics liked the film, with The New York Times saying, "...the new Bing Crosby film at the Paramount is a witty, lyrical and debonair farce, and a first-rate addition to the holiday bounties... Mr. Crosby, who has already shown that his talents include a gift for light comedy, emerges this time as a celebrated songbird who, having made his way in the world, decides to take his million dollars and satisfy all the frustrated ambitions which he had brooded over as a boy. Here Is My Heart is a bright and funny entertainment, deftly produced and happily performed."

Variety praised it as well: "A setup for the Crosby fans and an excellent example of musical comedy picture making. Here Is My Heart should have an easy time of it most anywhere. Crosby is in fine voice, the songs he was handed are honies, and the story serves nicely as something to hang the singing and the songs on... To change the pace the director has him singing while doing anything but hanging from a chandelier. One well planned departure has Crosby in a duet with his own voice playing on a phonograph."

== Soundtrack ==
- "June in January" (Ralph Rainger and Leo Robin) by Bing Crosby
- "With Every Breath I Take" (Ralph Rainger and Leo Robin) by Bing Crosby and Kitty Carlisle
- "Love Is Just Around the Corner" (Lewis E. Gensler and Leo Robin) by Bing Crosby and Cecilia Parker

Crosby also recorded the songs for Decca Records. All three of them enjoyed success, particularly "June in January". His songs were also included in the Bing's Hollywood series.

== See also ==
- The Grand Duchess and the Waiter (1926)
