= John Cumberland (actor) =

Canadian actor

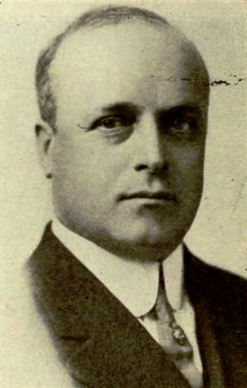
Cumberland in 1919

John Cumberland was a Canadian actor on stage and screen. He had starring roles and featured in comedies.

In 1919 he starred in the Pathé film The Gay Old Dog directed by Hobart Henley.

He co-starred in Mrs. Sidney Drew's After Thirty comedy film series and starred in her 1919 film The Gay Old Dog.

== Theater ==
- The Misleading Lady (1913)
- Twin Beds (1914)
- Fair and Warmer (1915)
- Parlor, Bedroom and Bath (1917)
- Double Exposure (1918)
- Up in Mabel's Room (1919)
- The Girl in the Limousine (1919)
- Ladies' Night (1920)
- Pickwick (1927)

== Filmography ==
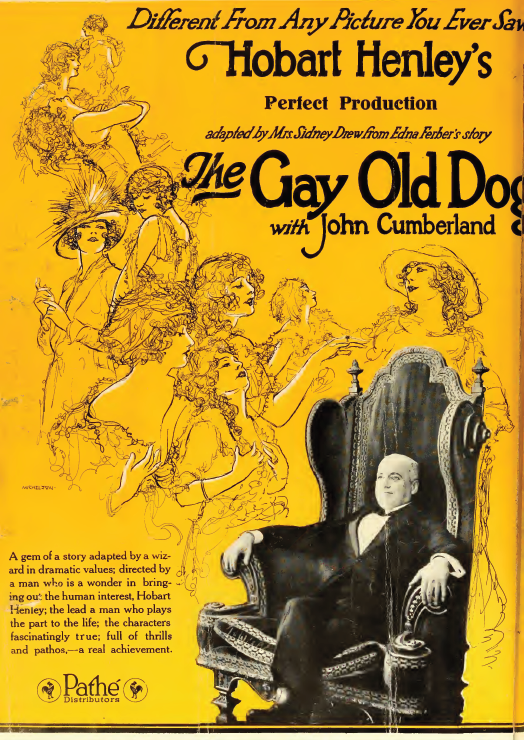
Advertisement for The Gay Old Dog

- Baby Mine, as Jimmie
- The Gay Old Dog (1919), as Jimmy Dodd
- A Sisterly Scheme (1919)
- The Unconventional Maida Greenwood (1920), a short, as Maida's Husband
- The Stimulating Mrs. Barton (1920), a short
- The Emotional Miss Vaughn (1920), a short
- The Charming Mrs. Chase (1920), a short

== Gallery ==
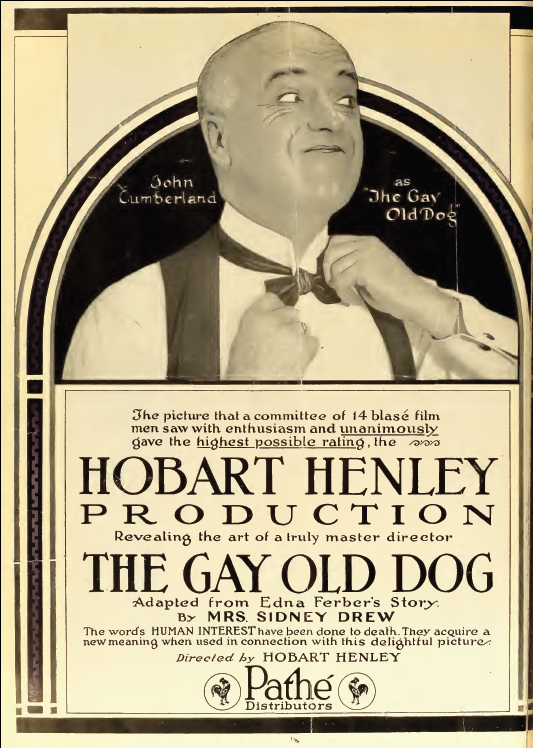

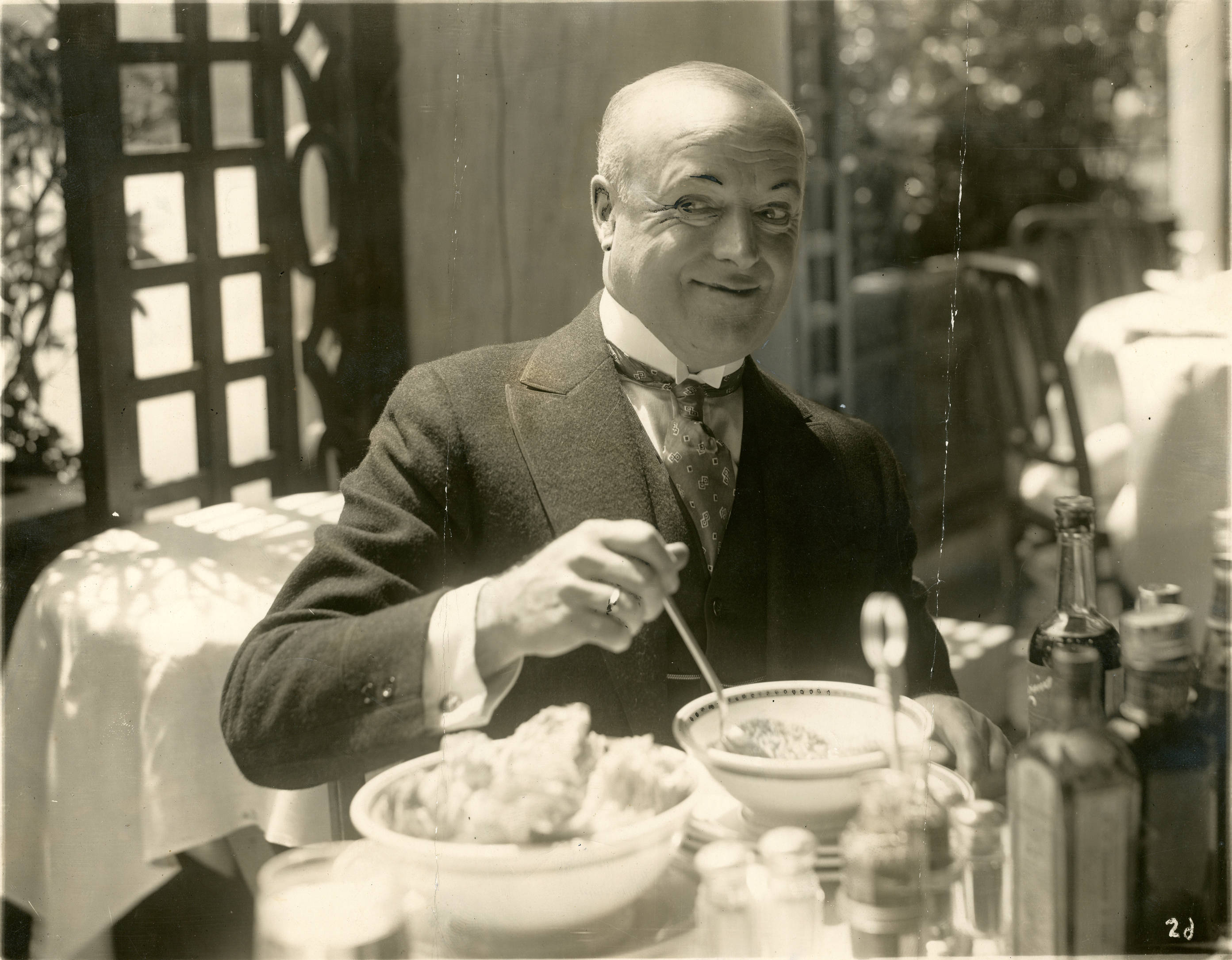

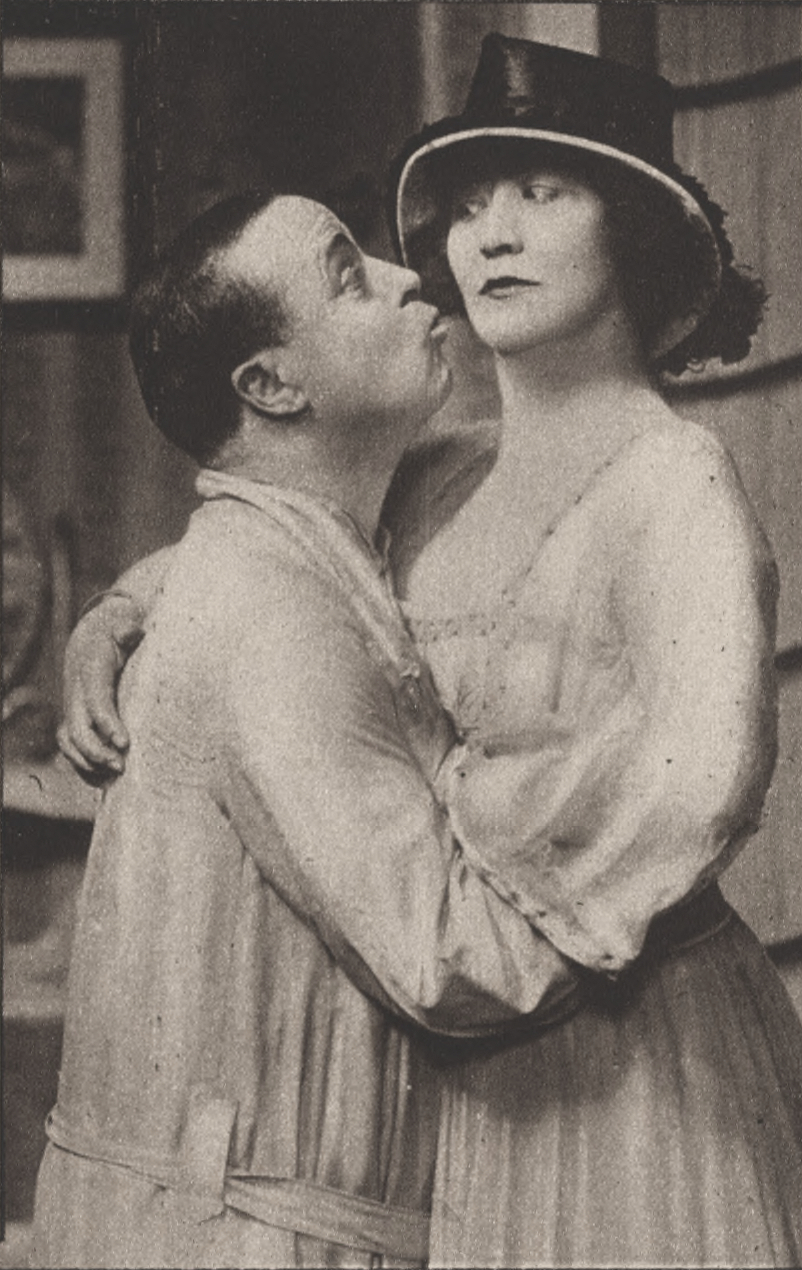

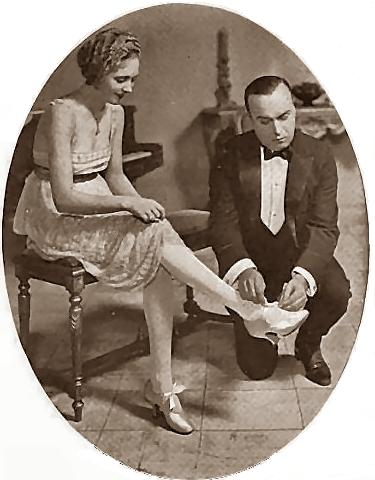

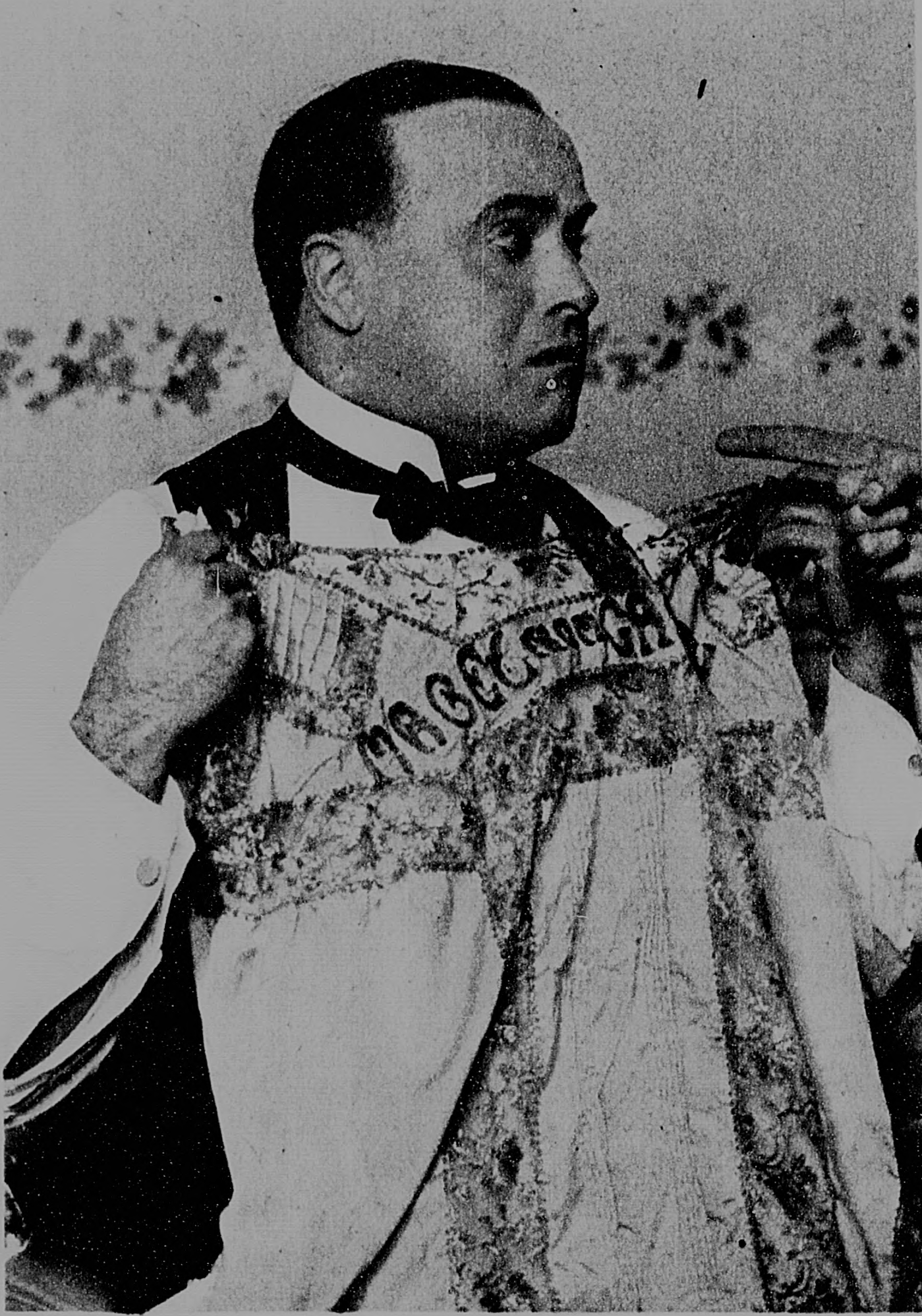
