= Children of Jazz =

1923 film by Jerome Storm

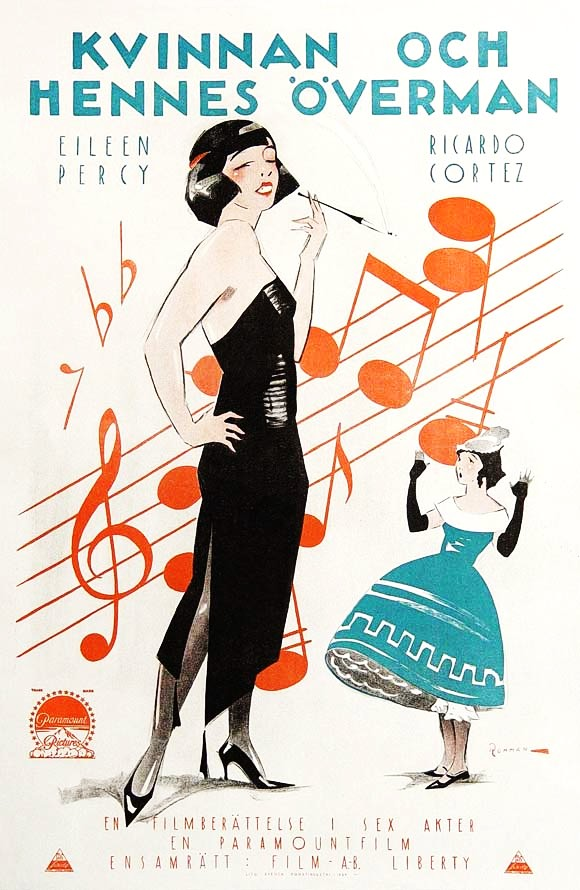
- Swedish poster
- Directed by: Jerome Storm
- Screenplay by: Beulah Marie Dix
- Based on: Other Times, a 1920 play by Harold Brighouse
- Produced by: Jesse L. Lasky
- Starring: Theodore Kosloff; Ricardo Cortez; Robert Cain; Eileen Percy; Irene Dalton; Alec B. Francis
- Cinematography: Devereaux Jennings
- Production company: Famous Players–Lasky Corporation
- Distributed by: Paramount Pictures
- Release date: July 8, 1923
- Running time: 60 minutes
- Country: United States
- Language: English

Children of Jazz is a lost 1923 American comedy silent film directed by Jerome Storm and adapted from Harold Brighouse's play Other Times (1920) by Beulah Marie Dix. The film stars Theodore Kosloff, Ricardo Cortez, Robert Cain, Eileen Percy, Irene Dalton and Alec B. Francis. The film was released on July 8, 1923, by Paramount Pictures.

== Cast ==
- Theodore Kosloff as Richard Forestall
- Ricardo Cortez as Ted Carter
- Robert Cain as Clyde Dunbar
- Eileen Percy as Babs Weston
- Irene Dalton as Lina Dunbar
- Alec B. Francis as John Weston
- Frank Currier as Adam Forestall
- Snitz Edwards as Blivens
- Lillian Drew as Deborah
- Julie Bishop as a Child
