= André Gailhard =

French composer (1885–1966)

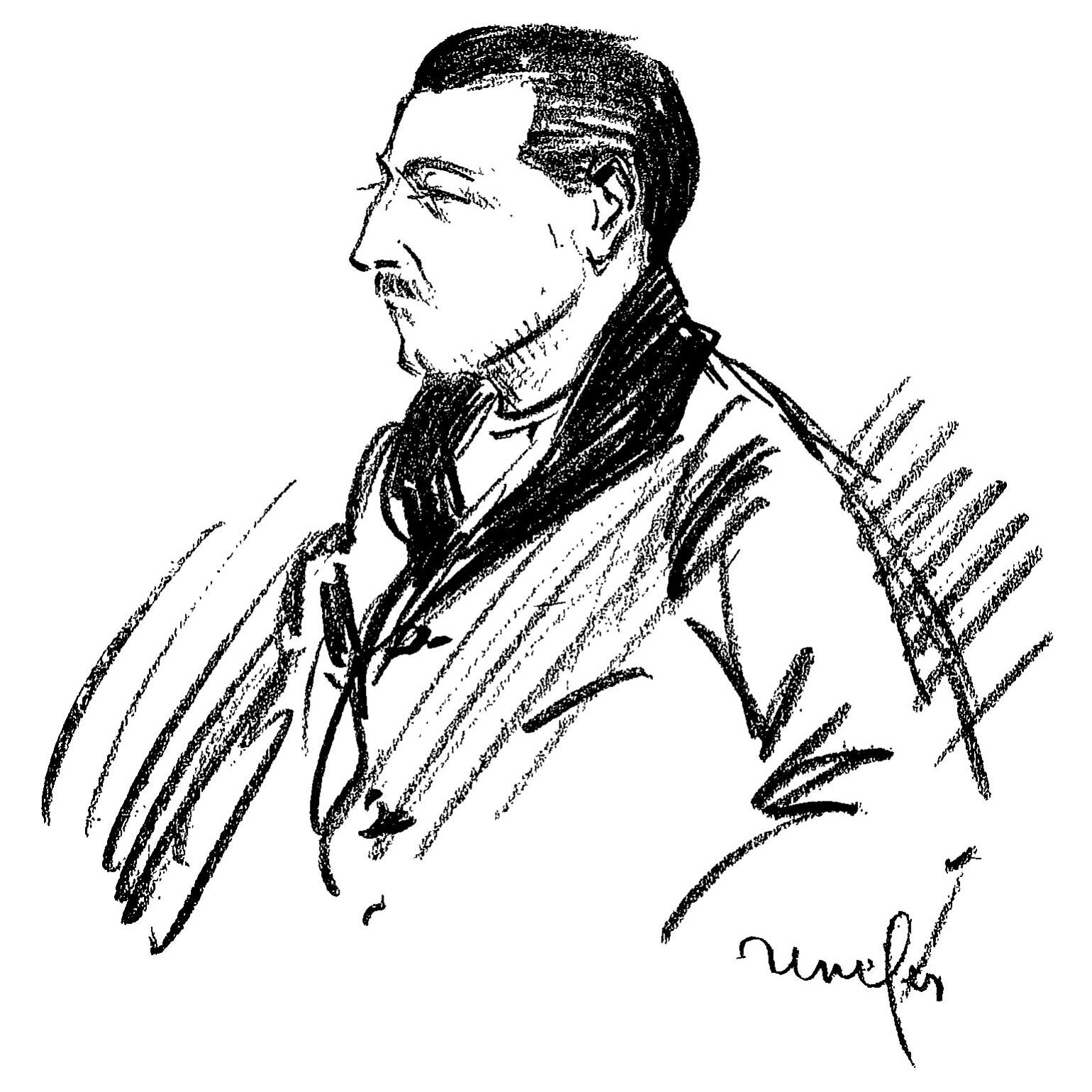
- Born: André Charles Samson Gailhard; 29 June 1885; Paris
- Died: 3 July 1966 (aged 81); Ermont
- Occupation: Composer

Signature
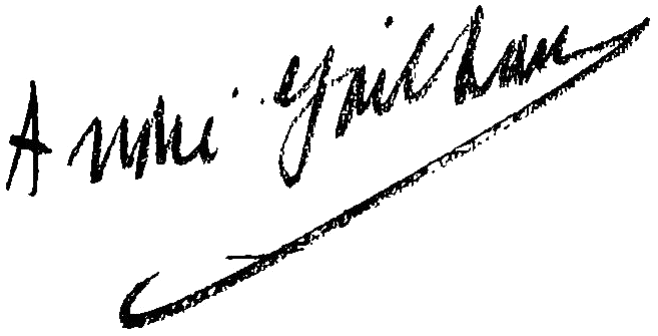

André Gailhard (29 June 1885 – 3 July 1966) was a French classical music composer.

== Biography ==
André Gailhard, full name André Charles Samson Gailhard, was the son of Pierre Gailhard, once the director of the Paris Opera. He studied at the Conservatoire de Paris with Paul Vidal, Xavier Leroux and Charles Lenepveu. In 1908 he won the prix de Rome for composition. He directed the Théâtre Fémina in Paris.

== Works ==
Gailhard composed several operas including Amaryllis, premiered in Toulouse in 1906, La fille du soleil (1909), Le Sortilège, in Paris in 1913 and La Bataille, in Paris in 1931. He also authored music for the ballet L'Aragonaise. Besides, he composed a Prélude et fugue pour grand orchestre as well as several lieder and film scores.
