= State Normal School at Valley City Historic District =

Historic district in North Dakota, United States

- U.S. National Register of Historic Places
- U.S. Historic district
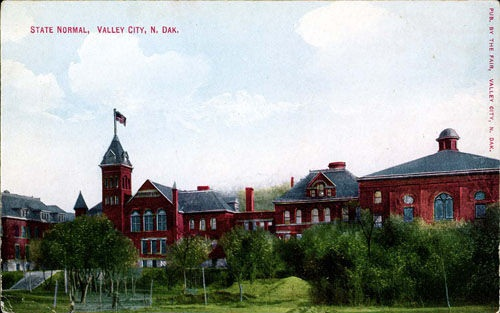
- State Normal School, c. 1900-1920

- Location within North Dakota Location within the United States
- Location: Roughly bounded by College St., SE., Second Ave., SE., Viking Dr. and Second Ave., SW., Valley City, North Dakota
- Coordinates: 46°55′06″N 98°00′09″W
- Area: 10.4 acres (4.2 ha)
- Built: 1892
- Architect: Hancock Brothers; et al.
- Architectural style: Modern Movement, Late 19th and 20th Century Revivals, Late Victorian
- NRHP reference No.: 95000049
- Added to NRHP: February 10, 1995

The State Normal School at Valley City Historic District, in Valley City, North Dakota, is listed on the National Register of Historic Places. It is a 10.4-acre (4.2 ha) historic district that covers the State Normal School at Valley City campus, now known as Valley City State University, and previously also known as the Valley City State Teachers College and as the Valley City State College.

The district includes Modern Movement, Late 19th and 20th Century Revivals, and Late Victorian architecture. When listed in 1995, it included 11 contributing buildings and two contributing structures. The Hancock Brothers designed some or all.

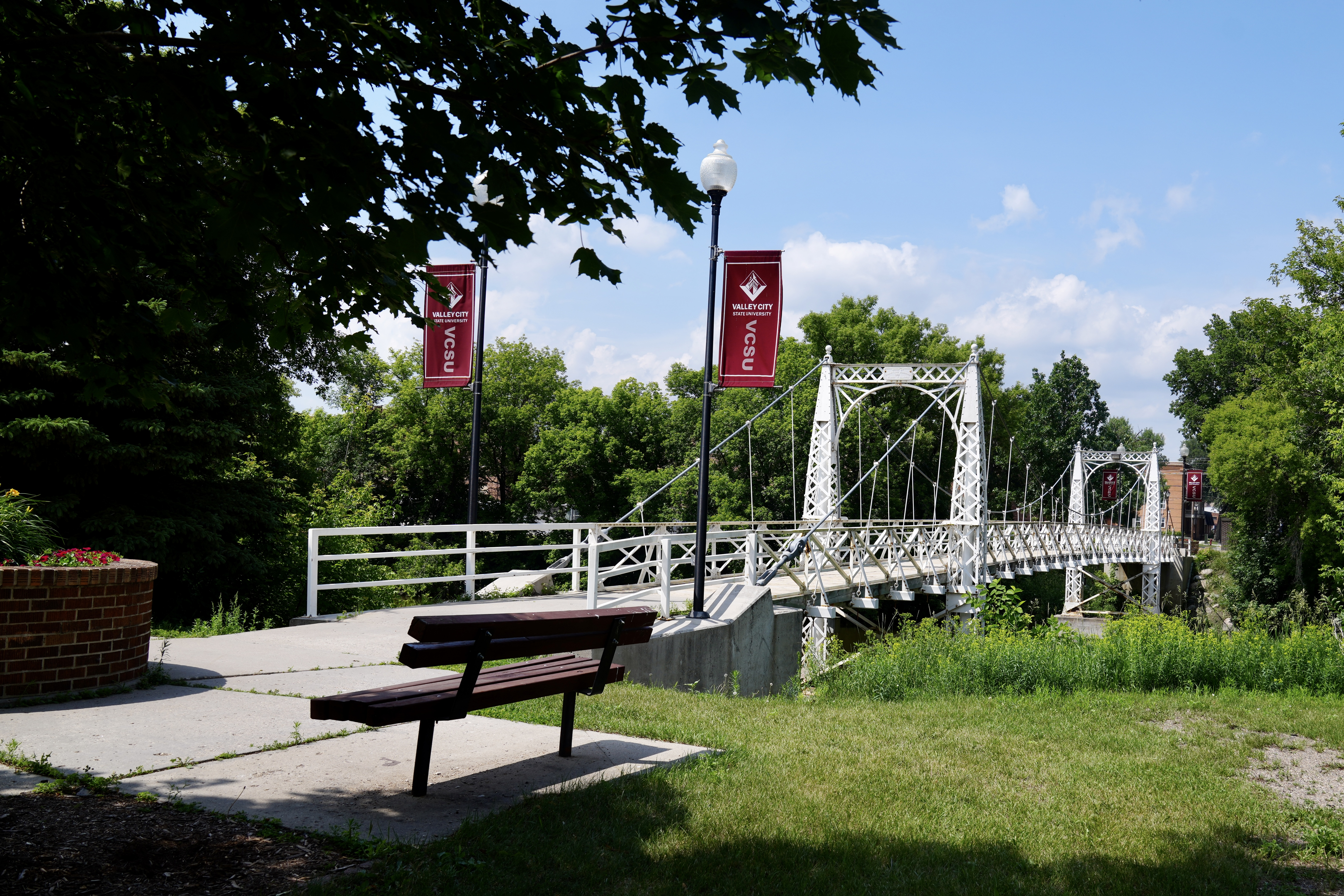
The Valley City State University Footbridge, an icon of the University

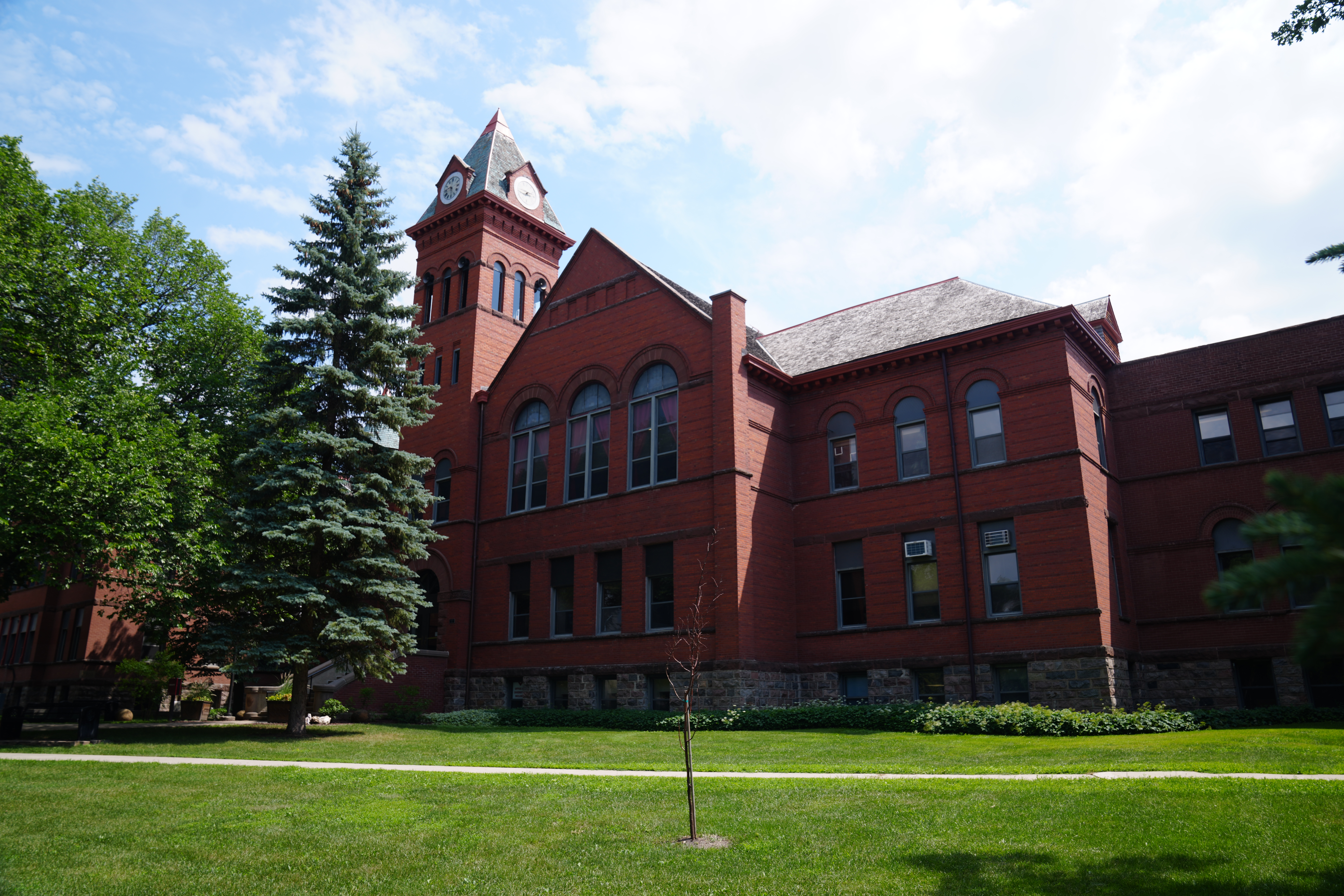
McFarland Hall on the Valley City State University campus.

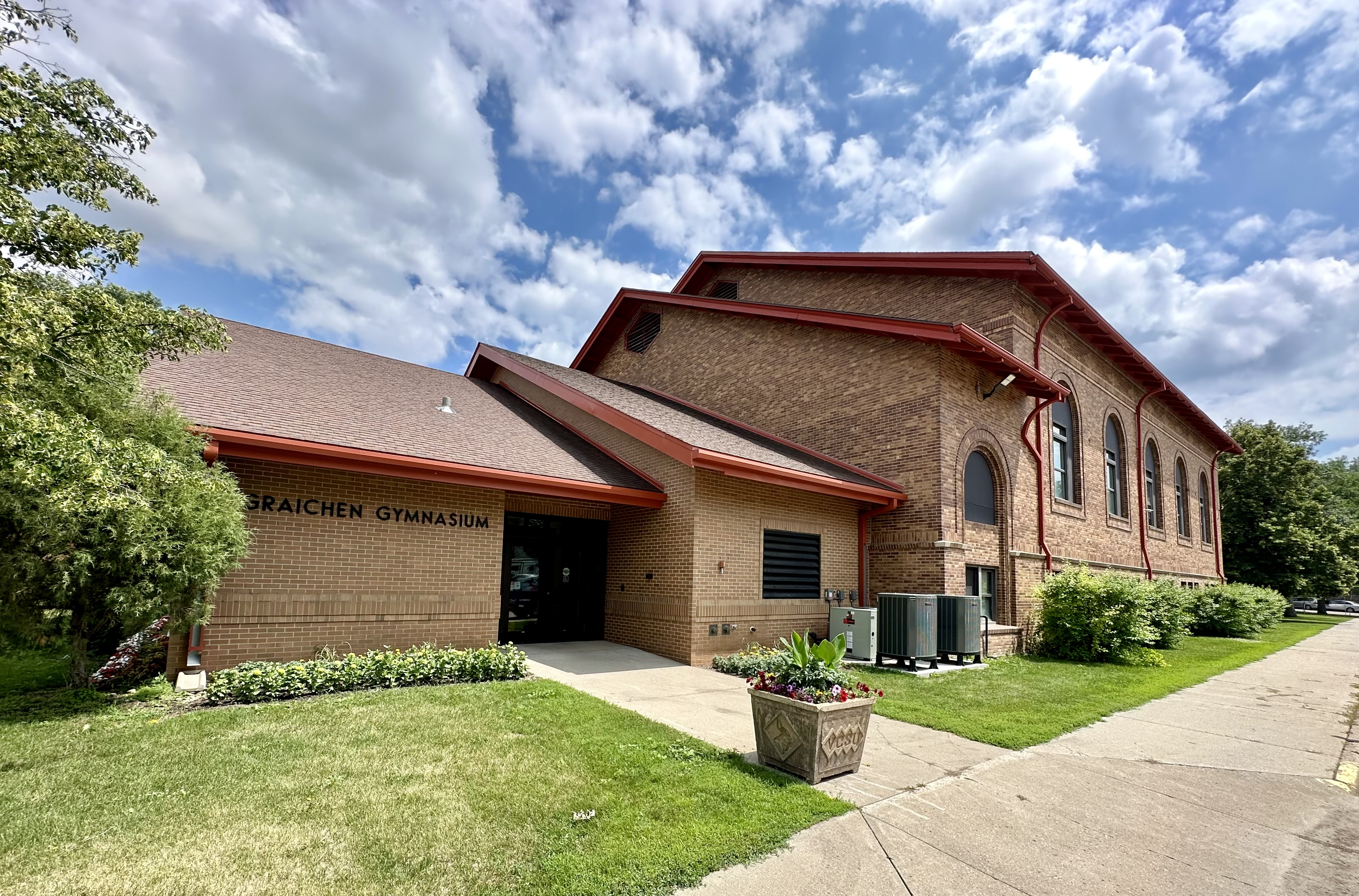
Charlotte Graichen Gymnasium, Valley City State University campus

== See also ==
- North Dakota State University District, in Fargo, also NRHP-listed
- University of North Dakota Historic District, in Grand Forks, also NRHP-listed
