= Charlton Andrews =

American educator and writer

Charlton Andrews (February 1, 1878 – August 13, 1939) was an American educator and writer whose works include the hit Broadway play Ladies' Night.

== Early life ==
Andrews was born on February 1, 1878, in Connersville, Indiana. After receiving a Bachelor of Philosophy degree from DePauw University and a Master of Arts from Harvard, he began a varied career working as a journalist, fiction writer, and teacher.

== Writing ==
Andrews was most famous as co-author (with Avery Hopwood) of the play Ladies' Night, which ran for 375 performances at the Eltinge 42nd Street Theatre on Broadway. His other plays include Bluebeard's Eighth Wife (a translation of a French play, La huitième femme de Barbe-Bleue), His Majesty the Fool, and Fioretta. Ladies' Night and Bluebeard's Eighth Wife were both adapted as movies.

His other works include the novels The Lady of Gestures, The Butterfly Murder, The Affair of the Malacca Stick, and The Affair of the Syrian Dagger. He also wrote books about writing, including The Drama To-day and The Technique of Play Writing. He served on the editorial staff of the New-York Tribune in 1914, and he wrote articles for Theatre Magazine.

== Educational career ==
He held teaching positions at the State College of Washington, the State Normal School at Valley City Historic District, New York University, and Brooklyn Polytechnic. His final teaching position was at Stuyvesant High School in New York starting in 1928.

== Later life and death ==
After receiving treatment for an unspecified illness at the Curie Institute in Paris, he died on August 13, 1939, at his summer home in Boothbay Harbor, Maine.
