= Brewster's Millions (disambiguation) =

Brewster's Millions is a 1902 comedic novel by George Barr McCutcheon.

Brewster's Millions may also refer to various adaptations based on the novel and, for the films also on the play:

- Brewster's Millions (play), a 1906 Broadway production by Winchell Smith and Byron Ongley
- Brewster's Millions (1914 film), directed by Cecil B. DeMille and Oscar Apfel
- Brewster's Millions (1921 film), starring Roscoe "Fatty" Arbuckle
- Brewster's Millions (1935 film), starring Jack Buchanan
- Brewster's Millions (1945 film), starring Dennis O'Keefe
- Brewster's Millions (1985 film), starring Richard Pryor

== See also ==
Other adaptations include:

- Miss Brewster's Millions, a 1926 film starring Bebe Daniels
- Three on a Spree, a 1961 film starring Jack Watling
- Arunachalam, a 1995 film starring Rajinikanth
- Brewster's Millions: Christmas, a 2024 film and sequel to the 1985 film.
