= Brewster's Millions (1985 film) =

1985 film by Walter Hill

- Promotional film poster
- Directed by: Walter Hill
- Written by: Timothy Harris; Herschel Weingrod
- Based on: Brewster's Millions 1902 novel by George Barr McCutcheon; Brewster's Millions 1906 play by Winchell Smith and Byron Ongley
- Produced by: Lawrence Gordon; Gene Levy; Joel Silver
- Starring: Richard Pryor; John Candy; Lonette McKee; Stephen Collins; Hume Cronyn
- Cinematography: Ric Waite
- Edited by: Freeman A. Davies; Michael Ripps
- Music by: Ry Cooder
- Production company: Silver Pictures
- Distributed by: Universal Pictures
- Release date: May 22, 1985
- Running time: 101 minutes
- Country: United States
- Language: English
- Budget: $15 million
- Box office: $45.8 million

Brewster's Millions is a 1985 American comedy film directed by Walter Hill. The film stars Richard Pryor, John Candy, Lonette McKee, Stephen Collins, and Hume Cronyn. The screenplay by Herschel Weingrod and Timothy Harris was based on the 1902 novel of the same name by George Barr McCutcheon. It is the seventh film based on the story, and focusing on a Minor League Baseball pitcher who accepts a challenge to spend $30 million in 30 days in order to inherit $300 million from his great-uncle.

The film was met with negative reviews. A sequel titled Brewster's Millions: Christmas was released on December 5, 2024.

== Plot ==
This is the story of Montgomery Brewster, a relief pitcher in the minor leagues of life, who got handed the American Dream...on a very hot plate.

— The opening text at the beginning of the movie.

Montgomery Brewster is a Minor League Baseball pitcher with the Hackensack Bulls. He and his best friend Spike Nolan, the Bulls' catcher, are arrested after a post-game bar fight. A man named Donaldo offers to post their bail if they plead guilty. Donaldo takes them to New York City with him. At the Manhattan law office of Granville & Baxter where Donaldo works, Brewster is told by executor Edward Roundfield that his recently deceased great-uncle Rupert Horn, whom he has never met, has left him his entire $300 million fortune with several stipulations:

- Brewster can choose to receive $1 million upfront. Firm owners George Granville and Norris Baxter will become the executors of the estate, collecting a fee for performing this service and dividing the remainder among several charities.
- Brewster can attempt to inherit the whole estate by spending $30 million in 30 days. He may not own any assets that are not already his at the end of the challenge, he must get value for the services of anyone he hires, he may not willfully damage or destroy any intrinsically valuable objects he buys, he may donate 5% to charity and lose 5% more by gambling, and he cannot give any of it away. Finally, he must keep the challenge a secret. If he fails to meet all terms, he forfeits any remaining balance and inherits nothing.

Brewster decides to take the $30 million challenge, and Angela Drake, a paralegal from the law firm, is assigned to accompany him and keep track of his spending.

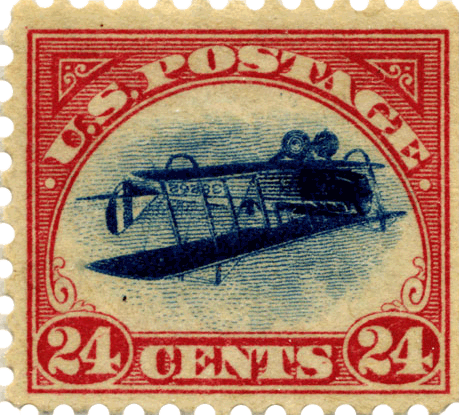
A copy of the famous Inverted Jenny appears in one of the film's gags.

Brewster, who has never earned more than $11,000 a year, rents an expensive suite at the Plaza Hotel, hires personal staff on exorbitant salaries, and places bad gambling bets. However, Spike (who is unaware of the rules of the challenge) makes good investments, earning Brewster money. Realizing that he is making no headway, Brewster decides to run for mayor of New York City and throws most of his money at a protest campaign urging a vote for "none of the above." Major candidates Heller and Salvino threaten to sue Brewster for his confrontational rhetoric, but they settle out of court for several million dollars.

Brewster then hires the New York Yankees for a three-inning exhibition against the Bulls, with himself as the pitcher. He even buys a rare stamp at great expense and uses it to mail a postcard to Granville and Baxter - this is allowed as he used the stamp for its intended purpose. He is forced to end his protest campaign when he learns that he is leading in the polls as a write-in candidate; the job carries an annual salary of $60,000, which is considered an asset under the terms of the will. Spending his last $38,000 on a party after the game, Brewster becomes fed up with money and is heartbroken that Spike, Angela, and others around him do not understand his actions that he is prohibited from explaining.

He awakens on the final day to find that Spike and his other friends are gone, along with the sycophantic treatment he received from the rest of his entourage. Heading for Granville & Baxter law firm, he learns that the city voted "None of the Above," forcing another election in which neither Heller nor Salvino are running.

Warren Cox, a junior lawyer from the law firm and Angela's fiancé, has been bribed by Granville and Baxter to ensure that Brewster fails to spend the entire $30 million. Moments before time expires, Cox hands Brewster some money previously thought to have been spent and informs him he is not broke. As Brewster is about to sign the document forfeiting his inheritance, Angela learns of the plot and reveals it to him. Brewster punches Cox, who threatens to sue and declines Brewster's offer of the money as compensation. Realizing that he will need a lawyer, Brewster pays the money to Angela as a retainer. With the transaction completed and all of the money spent, Brewster fulfills the terms of the will and inherits the entire $300 million. Roundfield tells Cox, Granville, and Baxter that he will open an investigation into their actions as Brewster and Angela leave together.

== Cast ==
- Richard Pryor as Montgomery "Monty" Brewster, a Minor League Baseball pitcher for the Hackensack Bulls
- John Candy as Spike Nolan, a baseball catcher for the Hackensack Bulls and Montgomery's friend
- Lonette McKee as Angela Drake, a paralegal who becomes Brewster's love interest
- Stephen Collins as Warren Cox, a junior lawyer at Granville & Baxter, and Angela's fiancé
- Hume Cronyn as Rupert Horn, the great-uncle of Montgomery who pre-recorded a challenge to Brewster. His motive for issuing the challenge stems from a childhood incident in which his father caught him smoking a cigar and made him smoke an entire box of them as punishment.
- David White as George Granville, the crooked head of Granville & Baxter who plans to make sure that Montgomery fails
- Jerome Dempsey as Norris Baxter, the crooked head of Granville & Baxter and George's partner who plans to make sure Montgomery fails.
- Jerry Orbach as Charlie Pegler, the coach of the Hackensack Bulls
- Pat Hingle as Edward Roundfield
- Tovah Feldshuh as Marilyn
- Peter Jason as Chuck Fleming
- Joe Grifasi as J. B. Donaldo, a photographer working at Granville & Baxter
- David Wohl as Eugene Provost
- Ji-Tu Cumbuka as Melvin
- Milt Kogan as Heller, a mayoral candidate
- Carmine Caridi as Salvino, a mayoral candidate
- Yakov Smirnoff as Vladimir
- Rick Moranis as Morty King
- Grand L. Bush as Rudy, a baseball player for a Camden baseball team.
- Conrad Janis as a businessman in a car
- Rosetta LeNoire as Judge R. Woods, a judge who oversees Montgomery and Chuck's trial following the bar fight
- Joseph Leon as the proprietor of a stamp store that Montgomery gets an expensive stamp from
- Robert Ellenstein as Mr. Carter
- Reni Santoni as Vin Rapelito
- Alan Autry as Biff Brown
- Joseph G. Medalis as a bank executive
- Malachy McCourt as George, a doorman
- Archie Hahn as an iceberg man
- Lin Shaye, Wesley Thompson, Strawn Bovee, and Matt Landers as the journalists at the rally
- Kip Waldo and Shaka Cumbuka as the hecklers at the rally
- Ken Medlock as Dixon

== Production ==
In 1982, the screen rights to the novel were acquired by Lawrence Gordon Productions. Peter Bogdanovich was the original director of the adaptation and had planned to include it among the six independent pictures he scheduled for 1983. His version was reported as being most similar to Allan Dwan's 1945 adaptation.

The project remained in development limbo for nearly two years until Frank Price, the new president at Universal, greenlit it to be the first production under his guidance. By then, Bogdanovich was no longer involved and Walter Hill was chosen to direct. He had never made a comedy before, but had made the successful 48 Hrs. which featured comic scenes and a comic lead, Eddie Murphy. The script was by the writers of Murphy's Trading Places.

"I'm always making westerns," Hill said. "Whether it's a movie that takes place in the future... or an action- adventure like 48 Hrs., what I'm really doing is making cowboy movies.... I like westerns because everything is very clear in them. 'I like movies in which the story line is simple and straightforward and the characters are confronted with issues of life and death. But Hollywood has decided that people don't like westerns anymore, so I have to make these other movies and pretend they're not westerns... My idea of a good movie is to take very clearly defined characters and put them in the highest possible jeopardy and then see what happens," Hill said.

Hill said Richard Pryor "didn't believe that he was funny unless he took drugs, and he believed that if he took drugs he would die. Also, he had money problems, of course, so he had to work and take jobs and make lots of money. So it was difficult, but I liked Richard very much."

The film was shot on location in New York. The fictional baseball park, which was said to be in Hackensack, New Jersey, was actually the re-used set from the short-lived TV series, Bay City Blues. It was situated within the 153-acre (62 ha) LADWP Valley Generating Station in Sun Valley, California. The set was demolished in 1989 when the LADWP redeveloped the site. The UK's Princess Anne visited the set during filming as part of a U.S. tour.

Walter Hill later said he purposefully made the film "to improve his bank account and success quotient".

== Reception ==
=== Box office ===
The film made $9,858,905 on its opening weekend of May 24, 1985, coming in third behind the concurrent openings of Rambo: First Blood Part II and A View to a Kill respectively. It ultimately grossed $40,833,132 domestically in addition to another $5,000,000 on the international market against a budget of $15 million.

=== Critical response ===
On review aggregator Rotten Tomatoes, the film has an approval rating of 38% based on 24 reviews, with an average score of 5/10. The website's critical consensus reads, "With Richard Pryor's trademark ribald humor tamped down, Brewster's Millions feels like a missed opportunity to update a classic story." On Metacritic, the film has a score of 37 based on 13 reviews, indicating "generally unfavorable" reviews.

The staff review in Variety said bluntly: "It's hard to believe a comedy starring Richard Pryor and John Candy is no funnier than this". Janet Maslin, in her review for The New York Times, called the film "a screwball comedy minus the screws" which "does nothing to accommodate Mr. Pryor's singular comic talents". Director Walter Hill, she said, did not understand "the advantages of screwball timing," and the film's slow pace and lack of style gives it "a fatuous artificiality". She went on to praise the film's supporting cast, including John Candy, but said that the "flat" screenplay forces Candy to repeat himself.

Walter Hill later called the movie "an aberration in the career line" being his only flat-out comedy. He added that "whatever [the film's] deficiencies, I think the wistful quality was there. I was happy about that. The picture did well and made money."
