= Norman Deane =

Norman Deane may refer to:

- Norman Deane, pseudonym of John Creasey (1908–1973), English crime and science fiction writer
- Norman Deane (cricketer) (1875–1950), Australian cricketer
