= The Making of Bobby Burnit =

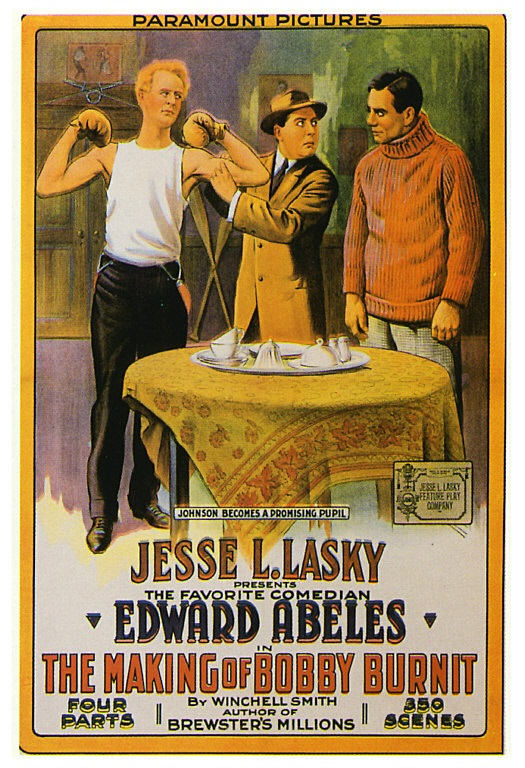
- Film poster
- Directed by: Oscar Apfel
- Screenplay by: George Randolph Chester; Winchell Smith
- Produced by: Jesse L. Lasky
- Starring: Edward Abeles; Bessie Barriscale; Howard Hickman; George Hernandez; Theodore Roberts; Sydney Deane
- Production company: Famous Players Film Company
- Distributed by: Paramount Pictures
- Release date: September 17, 1914
- Running time: 40 minutes
- Country: United States
- Language: English

The Making of Bobby Burnit is a lost 1914 American silent drama film directed by Oscar Apfel and written by George Randolph Chester and Winchell Smith. The film stars Edward Abeles, Bessie Barriscale, Howard Hickman, George Hernandez, Theodore Roberts and Sydney Deane. It was released on September 17, 1914, by Paramount Pictures.

== Cast ==
- Edward Abeles as Bobby Burnit
- Bessie Barriscale as Agnes Elliston
- Howard Hickman as Daniel Johnson
- George Hernandez as David Applerod
- Theodore Roberts as Sam Stone
- Sydney Deane as Silas Trimmer
- William Elmer as Biff Bates
- Robert Dunbar as Lawyer
