= Three on a Spree =

1961 British film by Sidney J. Furie

- Directed by: Sidney J. Furie
- Written by: George Barr McCutcheon (novel, "Brewster's Millions"); Winchell Smith and Byron Ongley (play, "Brewster's Millions")
- Produced by: Edward Small (executive); George Fowler; David Rose (executive)
- Starring: Jack Watling; Carole Lesley; John Slater
- Cinematography: Stephen Dade
- Edited by: Bert Rule
- Music by: Ken Thorne
- Production company: Caralan Productions
- Distributed by: United Artists
- Release date: 28 June 1961
- Running time: 90 minutes
- Country: United Kingdom
- Language: English
- Budget: £23,000

Three on a Spree (also known as Brewster's Millions) is a 1961 British comedy film directed by Sidney J. Furie and starring Jack Watling, Carole Lesley and John Slater. It is based on the 1902 novel Brewster's Millions by George Barr McCutcheon, which became the hit 1906 play written by Winchell Smith and Byron Ongley. It had been previously filmed by Edward Small in 1945.

The film was shot at Walton Studios. Its sets were designed by the art director John Blezard.

== Plot ==
Michael Brewster stands to inherit £8,000,000, but only if he can spend the first million in 60 days.

== Cast ==
- Jack Watling as Michael Brewster
- Carole Lesley as Susan
- Renée Houston as Mrs. Gray
- John Slater as Sid Johnson
- Colin Gordon as Mitchell
- John Salew as Mr. Monkton
- Julian Orchard as Walker
- Libby Morris as Trixie
- Cardew Robinson as Micki
- Ernest Clark as Colonel Drew
- Ronald Adam as Judge
- Vic Wise as Spider
- Hugh Morton as Grant
- Tony Thawnton as costume designer
- Larry Taylor as large man
- Ruth Lee as receptionist
- Johnny Vyvyan as Big Louis
- Jeanne Moody as Barbara Drew
- Marne Maitland as Eastern gentleman
- Gertan Klauber as Joe
- Alf Dean as enormous man
- Frank Forsyth as barman
- Geoffrey Denton as counsel
- John Watson as 1st inventor

== Reception ==
The Monthly Film Bulletin wrote: "A new version of that hoary stage success, Brewster's Millions, which rings far too many changes on its central idea and leaves its hard-pressed cast panting by the time the inevitable happy ending is reached. There are one or two good gags and lively moments, but the comedy is otherwise sparse and leaden."

The New York Times found the film "all unbelievable and more than a little unpleasant."

The Radio Times Guide to Films gave the film 3/5 stars, writing: "First made as a silent by Oscar Apfel and Cecil B. DeMille in 1914, Brewster's Millions underwent another reworking in this shoddy British offering. The story lumbers around London as Jack Watling attempts to spend a small fortune in a bid to land a whopping inheritance. Carole Lesley comes along for the ride, without bringing much to the picnic. Sidney J Furie's leaden, laugh-free direction saps the morale of a willing, but woefully wasted supporting cast."
