= Brewster's Millions (1921 film) =

1921 film

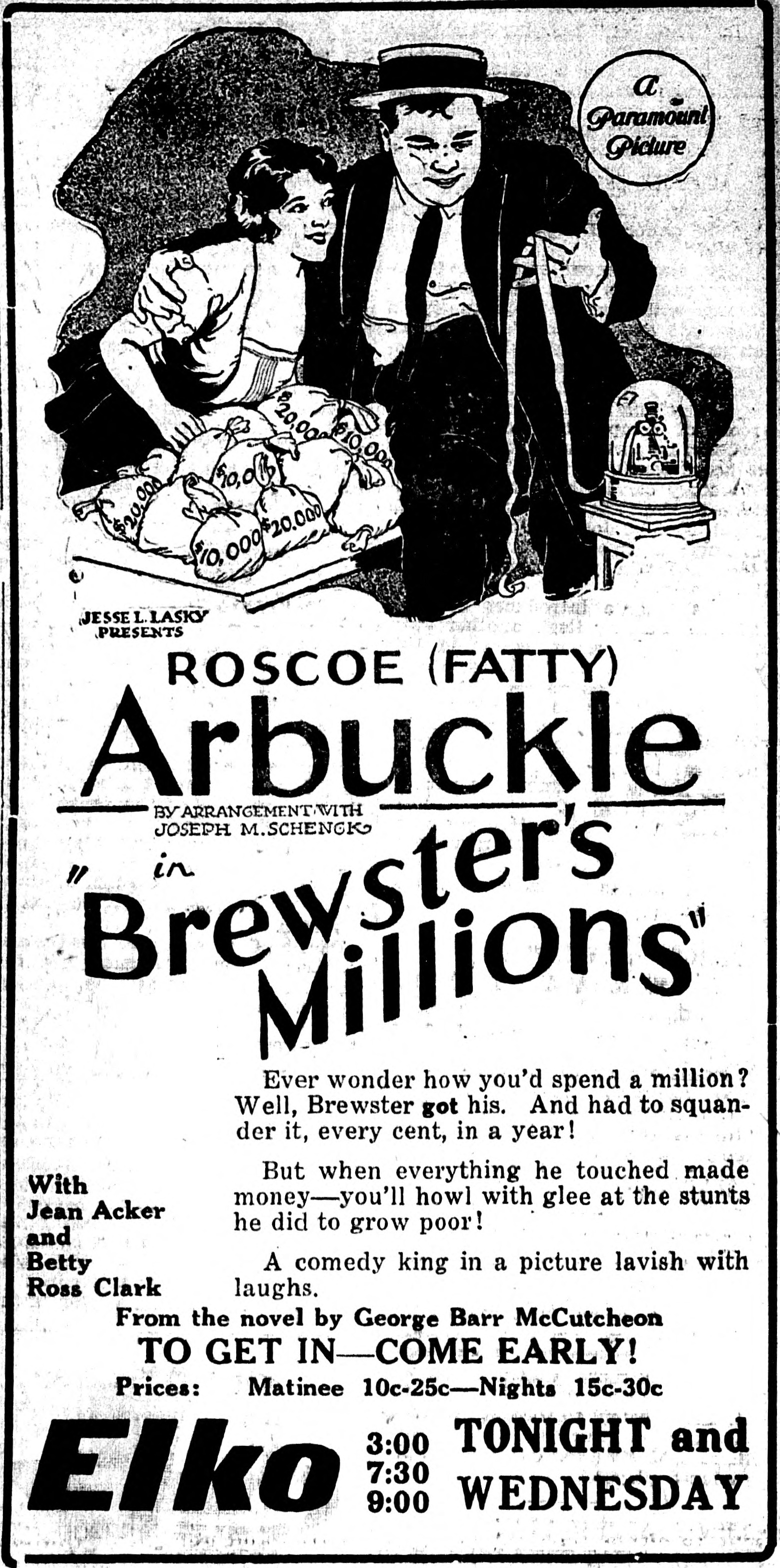
- A newspaper advertisement for the film.
- Directed by: Joseph Henabery
- Written by: Walter Woods
- Based on: Brewster's Millions 1902 novel by George Barr McCutcheon; Brewster's Millions by; 1906 play; Winchell Smith and Byron Ongley
- Produced by: Adolph Zukor; Jesse Lasky
- Starring: Fatty Arbuckle
- Cinematography: Karl Brown
- Production company: Famous Players-Lasky Corp.
- Distributed by: Paramount Pictures
- Release date: January 28, 1921
- Running time: 61 minutes; 6 reels (5,502 feet)
- Country: United States
- Language: Silent (English intertitles)

Brewster's Millions is a lost 1921 American comedy film starring Fatty Arbuckle. It is an adaptation of the 1902 novel written by George Barr McCutcheon as well as the 1906 Broadway smash hit play of the same name starring Edward Abeles.

== Plot ==
As summarized in a film publication, Monte Brewster's two grandfathers, one rich and the other a self-made man, squabble as to the way the infant should be raised. The mother steps in and decides to raise the child her way, which results in Monte being a clerk in a steamship office at the age of 21. At this point the grandfathers get together again, with one grandfather giving him $1 million, and the other offering $4 million provided that at the end of one year Monte spends the $1 million given by the other grandfather. Other conditions include that he be absolutely "broke" at the end of one year, that he not marry for five years, and not to tell any one of the arrangement. Young Brewster tries everything he can to get rid of the money, but everything he does and the wildest chances he takes result in more money for him. He hires three men to help him spend the money, but they take too much interest in investing it wisely. They hire Peggy Gray for a position in Monte's office to manage his affairs so that he will not lose his money. Peggy purchases some mines in Peru and a ship Monte has hired for a pleasure cruise is used to go to Peru, but they never get there. They rescue a ship in distress and then are forced to turn back. At the last minute, Monte is dead broke but married to Peggy. But the salvage on the ship Monte rescued brings him $2 million, and the Peruvian government extends the time for working the mines, so everything ends happy.

== Cast ==
- Roscoe "Fatty" Arbuckle as Monte Brewster
- Betty Ross Clarke as Peggy
- Fred Huntley as Mr. Brewster
- Marian Skinner as Mrs. Brewster
- James Corrigan as Mr. Ingraham
- Jean Acker as Barbara Drew
- Charles Ogle as Colonel Drew
- Neely Edwards as MacLeod
- William Boyd as Harrison
- L.J. McCarthy as Ellis
- J. Parker McConnell as Pettingill
- John MacFarlane as Blake

== See also ==
- Brewster's Millions (film), other film adaptations of the novel
