= Sydney Deane =

Australian first-class cricketer and entertainer

Personal information
- Full name: Sydney Leslie Deane
- Born: 1 March 1863; Balmain, Sydney, New South Wales, Australia
- Died: 20 March 1934 (aged 71); New York, U.S.
- Batting: Right-handed
- Role: Wicket-keeper
- Relatives: Maggie Melrose (wife; m. 1891-1922); Billy Murdoch (cousin); Norman Deane (cousin)

Domestic team information
- Years: Team
- 1890: New South Wales
- First-class debut: 25 January 1890 New South Wales v Victoria
- Last First-class: 14 February 1890 New South Wales v South Australia

Career statistics
Competition	First-class
Matches	2
Runs scored	26
Batting average	26.00
100s/50s	0/0
Top score	23*
Catches/stumpings	7/0
- Source: CricketArchive, 21 September 2008

Sydney Leslie Deane (1 March 1863 – 20 March 1934) was an Australian first-class cricketer and entertainer, who later appeared in Hollywood movies.

== Biography ==
=== In Australia ===
Born in Balmain, Sydney, to Edward and Sophia, Deane was a promising junior Rugby Union player and represented New South Wales against Queensland. Along with his cousins, Australian Test captain Billy Murdoch and Norman Deane, who played first-class cricket for New South Wales, Deane also excelled in cricket, and made his first-class debut for New South Wales, against Victoria, at the Association Ground, Sydney on 25 January 1890. A wicket-keeper, Deane held six catches, at that time an Australian first-class record and caught the attention of the selectors for the Australian squad for the upcoming Ashes tour of Britain. In the next match, against South Australia, Deane also performed well, and starred in a non-first-class match against a Queensland XV.

On 19 February 1890, Deane was selected in the Australian cricket squad. However, the Victorian members of the squad protested against Deane's inclusion, arguing that it was favouritism towards New South Wales. Victorian wicket keeper Jack Blackham, a key member of the Australian side, went as far as to threaten to boycott the tour if Deane was selected ahead of fellow Victorian Jack Harry. Eventually a compromise wicket keeper, Tasmanian Kenneth Burn was selected, although Burn had never kept wicket in his life.

Following the Test selection drama, Deane moved to Melbourne after accepting an offer to appear with J.C. Williamson's theatrical troupe. Deane "possessed a magnificent tenor voice" and quickly became a leading performer around Australia and New Zealand, appearing in Gilbert and Sullivan operettas such as The Gondoliers. Deane also moved into theatre production management, co-founding and managing the Elite Vaudeville Company, which ran a number of productions starring Deane, including a farce based on Trilby entitled Trill-B!, in which Deane played the character of Sven-Garlic.

Deane married Maggie Melrose, an actress in Melbourne comic opera, in 1891. She died in New York in 1922.

Deane continued to play cricket in Melbourne, and although unable to break into the Victorian side, due to the presence of Blackham, Deane represented East Melbourne against an English touring side in 1892.

=== In the United States ===
Deane left Australia for the United States of America in the late 1890s, where he soon became a leading Vaudeville entertainer, appearing on Broadway musicals, including the original cast of Florodora, which ran for 553 performances, The Woggle-Bug (based on The Wonderful Wizard of Oz), The Knickerbocker Girl and My Lady Molly.

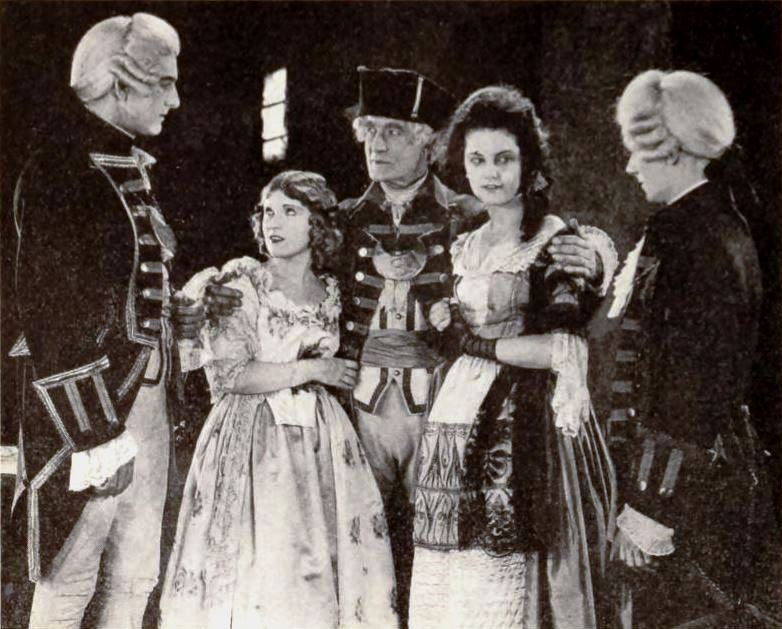
Sydney Deane (center) in The Last of the Mohicans (1920)

Impressed by his acting ability, Jesse L. Lasky recruited Deane to join the Jesse L. Lasky Feature Play Company, which relocated to Hollywood to produce films. Deane made his film debut in 1914 in the original version of Brewster's Millions, which was Cecil B. DeMille's second film. Deane appeared in a number of DeMille's early films before signing a contract with Universal Pictures, where he appeared in movies alongside Lon Chaney Sr.

While acting, Deane continued to play cricket, firstly in New York for the "New York Veterans" and later in California, where he played into his late fifties.

Deane's final film appearance was in the 1924 film America, directed by D.W. Griffith, after which he retired to New York, where he died, aged 71. Unusually for an actor and cricketer of his significance, neither Variety nor Wisden ran his obituary.

== Filmography ==
Title	Year	Role	Notes
Brewster's Millions	1914	Jonas Sedgwick	
The Call of the North	1914	McTavish	
The Virginian	1914	Uncle Hughey	
The Making of Bobby Burnit	1914	Silas Trimmer	aka Bobby Burnit
What's His Name	1914	Uncle Peter	
Ready Money	1914	Owner of the Skyrocket	
Rose of the Rancho	1914	Ranch Owner	
The Girl of the Golden West	1915	Sidney Duck	
The Goose Girl	1915	Prince Regent of Jugendheit	
The Warrens of Virginia	1915	General Harding	
A Gentleman of Leisure	1915	Sir Thomas Blunt	
Stolen Goods	1915	Mr. North	
The Arab	1915	Dr. Hilbert	
The Secret Orchard	1915	Nanette's father	
The Scarlet Chastity	1916		
Playthings of the Gods	1916		
The Evil Women Do	1916	Malgat/Papa Ravinet	Billed as "Sydney Dean". The film was also known as The Clique of Gold.
Melting Millions	1917	Uncle Peter	
The Grip of Love	1917		
The Field of Honor	1917	Poole	Billed as "Sidney Deane".
A Doll's House	1917	Dr. Rank	
The Gray Ghost	1917		
The Reed Case	1917	John Reed	Billed as "Sydney Dean".
Sirens of the Sea	1917	Wellington Stanhope	Released as Darlings of the Gods in the United Kingdom.
Beloved Jim	1917	Lawrence Darcy	
The Wife He Bought	1918	James Brierson	
The Midnight Trail	1918	Reverend Robert Moreland	
Breakers Ahead	1918	Hiram Hawley	
No Man's Land	1918		
The Lure of the Circus	1918	Reynolds	Billed as "Sidney Deane".
A Man and His Money	1919	John Sturgeon	
The Crimson Gardenia	1919	Papa la Forge	Billed as "Sidney Deane".
Male and Female	1919	Thomas	
The Midlanders	1920	Judge Van Hart	
Treasure Island	1920	Squire Trelawney	
The Strange Boarder	1920	Dawson	
Once a Plumber	1920	Fenelon	Billed as "Sidney Deane".
The Last of the Mohicans	1920	General Webb	
Find the Woman	1922	Sofford	
Missing Millions	1922	Donald Gordon	
Her Own Story	1922		
The Broken Violin	1923	Dr. Mason	
America	1924	Sir Ashley Montague	Released as Love and Sacrifice in the UK.

== See also ==
- List of New South Wales representative cricketers
