= Miss Brewster's Millions =

1926 film by Clarence G. Badger

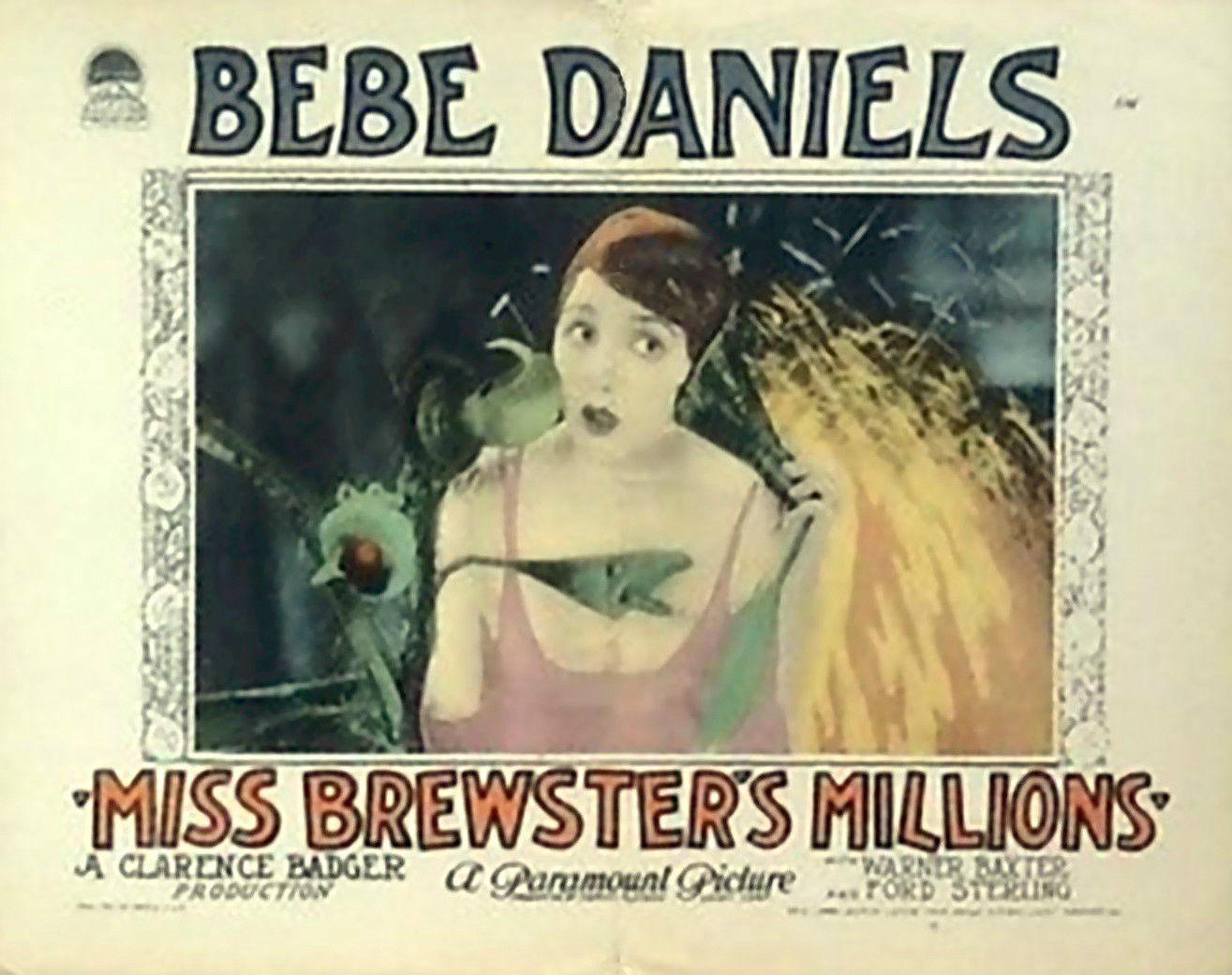
- Lobby card
- Directed by: Clarence G. Badger
- Written by: Monte Brice (adaptation); Lloyd Corrigan (writer); Harold Shumate (writer)
- Based on: Brewster's Millions by George Barr McCutcheon Brewster's Millions by Winchell Smith and Byron Ongley
- Produced by: Adolph Zukor; Jesse L. Lasky
- Starring: Bebe Daniels
- Cinematography: H. Kinley Martin
- Production company: Famous Players–Lasky
- Distributed by: Paramount Pictures
- Release date: March 22, 1926
- Running time: 72 minutes
- Country: United States
- Language: Silent (English intertitles)

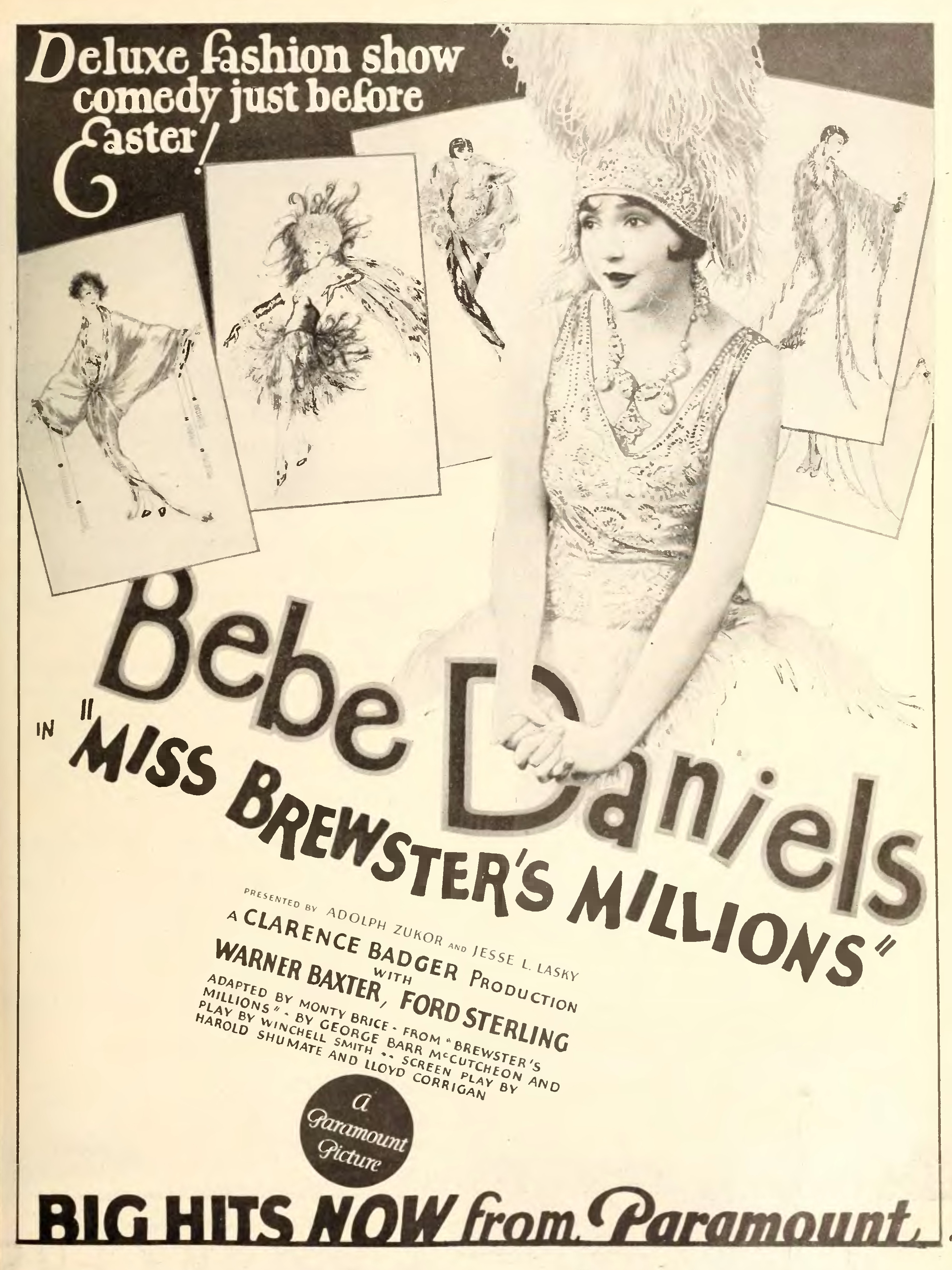
Miss Brewster's Millions ad in Motion Picture News, 1926

Miss Brewster's Millions is a 1926 American silent comedy film produced by Famous Players–Lasky and distributed by Paramount Pictures. Clarence G. Badger directed and the ever-popular Bebe Daniels starred. It was based on the 1902 novel by George Barr McCutcheon and a 1906 play adaptation of the same name by Winchell Smith and Byron Ongley, which had been filmed before in 1921 with Roscoe Arbuckle.

== Plot ==
Polly Brewster, a penniless Hollywood extra, inherits one million dollars from her recently deceased father. However, young lawyer Tom Hancock informs her that she cannot spend the money but must invest it. Her Uncle Ned Brewster arrives and in revenge for indignities his brother made him suffer, he offers Polly his entire fortune of $5 million on the condition that she spend the inherited million within 30 days or less. Polly gleefully sets about investing, gives a great ball and fashion show, and runs down a man with her car and has him sue for a large sum. When the deadline arrives, Uncle Ned proves to be penniless; there is no $5 million to be inherited. However, Polly finds that her investment in a motion picture company has yielded a handsome return, and she finds happiness with Tom.

== Cast ==
- Bebe Daniels as Polly Brewster
- Warner Baxter as Thomas B. Hancock Jr.
- Ford Sterling as Ned Brewster
- André de Beranger as Mr. Brent
- Miss Beresford as Landlady

== Preservation status ==
Miss Brewster's Millions is now considered a lost film.
