= Ready Money (film) =

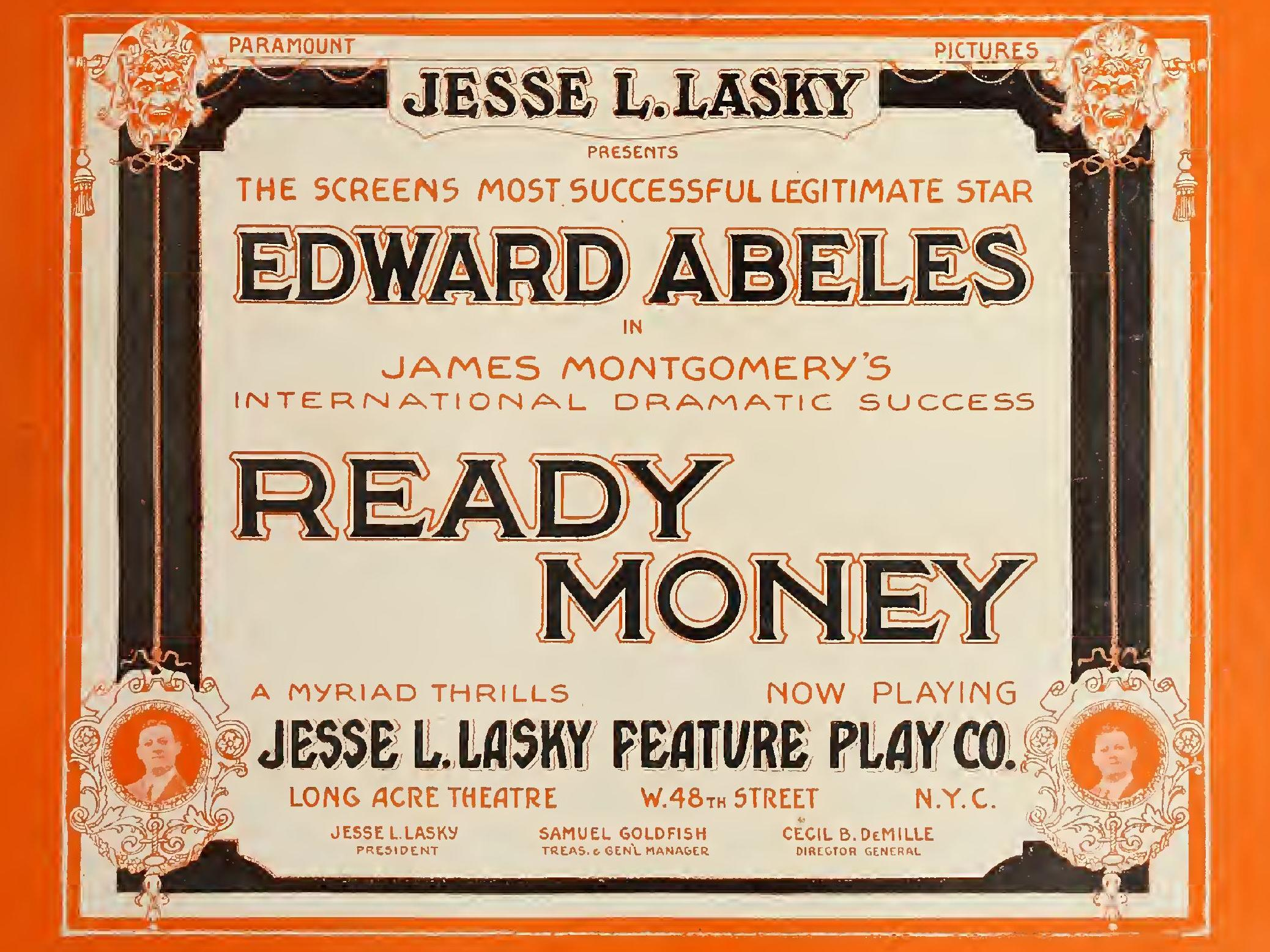
- Directed by: Oscar Apfel
- Screenplay by: James Montgomery (play and screenplay)
- Starring: Edward Abeles; Monroe Salisbury; Jode Mullally; Jane Darwell; Bessie Barriscale; Florence Dagmar
- Production company: Jesse L. Lasky Feature Play Company
- Distributed by: Paramount Pictures
- Release date: November 5, 1914
- Country: United States
- Language: Silent (English intertitles)

Ready Money is a 1914 American silent comedy film directed by Oscar Apfel adapted by James Montgomery from his play of the same name. The film stars Edward Abeles, Monroe Salisbury, Jode Mullally, Jane Darwell, Bessie Barriscale and Florence Dagmar. The film was released on November 5, 1914, by Paramount Pictures.

== Plot ==
As described in a film magazine, Stephen Baird and Mike Reardon go out west to seek their fortune in mining. They discover an abandoned mine, but find that there is an ore deposit on the premises but in the opposite direction than the mine was dug. Stephen travels home to New York to finalize the purchase of the land.

In New York, Stephen finds his first investor, Jackson Ives, who produces $50,000 in cash. When Stephen's wealthy friends see the cash, assuming he has struck gold, they all rush to invest in his mining operation.

Meanwhile, out west, the owner of a neighboring mine, James Morgan, finds out that the line of ore that Mike is working on traverses both his and Stephen's property. Morgan attempts to sabotage the mine with an explosion. However, the plan backfires as the explosion reveals the gold ore.

== Cast ==
- Edward Abeles as Steve Baird
- Monroe Salisbury as Sidney Rosenthal
- Jode Mullally as John H. Tyler
- Jane Darwell as Mrs. Tyler
- Bessie Barriscale as Grace Tyler
- Florence Dagmar as Ida Tyler
- James Neill as Jackson Ives
- Theodore Roberts as Mike Reardon
- William Elmer as Jim Dolan
- Sydney Deane as Owner of the Skyrocket
- Dick La Reno as Captain West
- Fred Montague as James R. Morgan

== Preservation ==
A complete 35 mm print of Ready Money is held by the Library of Congress.
