= The Day of the Dog =

1904 novel by George Barr McCutcheon

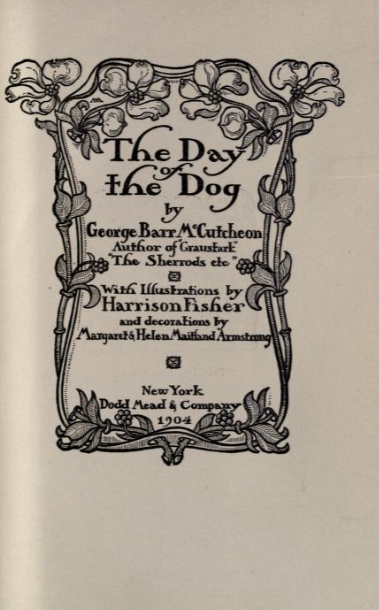
- Title page for The Day of the Dog (1904)
- Author: George Barr McCutcheon
- Illustrator: Harrison Fisher
- Language: English
- Genre: Novel
- Publisher: A. L. Burt and Co.
- Publication date: 1904
- Publication place: United States
- Media type: Print (hardback & paperback)

The Day of the Dog is a novel written by George Barr McCutcheon in 1904.
