= Brewster's Millions (1935 film) =

1935 British film by Thornton Freeland

- Theatrical release poster
- Directed by: Thornton Freeland
- Written by: Arthur Wimperis; Donovan Pedelty (scenario); Clifford Grey; Wolfgang Wilhelm; Douglas Furber
- Based on: Brewster's Millions 1902 novel by George Barr McCutcheon; Brewster's Millions by; 1906 play; Winchell Smith and Byron Ongley
- Produced by: Herbert Wilcox
- Starring: Jack Buchanan; Lili Damita
- Cinematography: Barney McGill; Henry Harris (uncredited)
- Edited by: David Lean (uncredited); Merrill G. White (uncredited)
- Music by: Ray Noble; Douglas Furber (lyrics); Geraldo; Harry Perritt; Marr Mackie (uncredited)
- Production company: Herbert Wilcox Productions (for) British & Dominions Film Corporation
- Distributed by: United Artists (UK)
- Release date: January 1935 (UK)
- Running time: 80 minutes
- Country: United Kingdom
- Language: English

Brewster's Millions is a 1935 British musical comedy film directed by Thornton Freeland and starring Jack Buchanan, Lili Damita and Nancy O'Neil. It was written by Arthur Wimperis, Donovan Pedelty, Clifford Grey, Wolfgang Wilhelm and Douglas Furber based on the 1902 novel by George Barr McCutcheon and subsequent 1906 play by Winchell Smith and Byron Ongley with the action relocated from the United States to Britain.

== Plot ==
Jack Brewster, a pauper living in London and the heir to a fortune from his wealthy father, falls in love with Cynthia, a boarder in his boarding house. When Jack inherits his fortune, which includes £500,000 and the house, he falls prey to chorus girl Rosalie. His uncle then dies, leaving Jack six million pounds, on the condition that he become penniless in the next six months. At his housewarming for his first inheritance, Jack learns of the second bequest, which requires him not only to lose all his money, but to have no female entanglements and tell no one of its conditions.

Jack goes on a wild spending spree, which includes producing a musical stage show starring Rosalie. He then takes the entire cast of the show on a yacht to Monte Carlo, in the hope of losing his money through gambling. Jack has nothing but good luck, however, as the show is a hit and he even wins at the gambling tables. Jack goes so far as to buy some seemingly worthless stock, which only turns out to be worth another fortune. Jack undergoes various indignities, such as being chased by kidnappers through a fiesta, which ends with him winding up as the rear end of a paper mache dragon. Throughout his spending spree, Cynthia becomes more detached and Rosalie more attached. As his "zero hour" approaches, Jack trades away his entire fortune, leaving him with nothing more than the suit he wears, despite the well-meaning attempts of friends to give him money. Finally meeting all the conditions of his uncle's will, Jack attains the £6,000,000, as well as the love of Cynthia.

== Cast ==
- Jack Buchanan as Jack Brewster
- Lili Damita as Rosalie
- Nancy O'Neil as Cynthia
- Sydney Fairbrother as Miss Plimsole
- Ian Maclean as McLeod
- Fred Emney as Freddy
- Allan Aynesworth as Rawles
- Laurence Hanray as Grant
- Dennis Hoey as Mario
- Henry Wenman as Pedro
- Amy Veness as Mrs Barry
- Jean Gillie as Miss Tompkins

== Critical reception ==
Kine Weekly wrote: "Spectacular comedy, a musical version of the well known play, gaily embellished with tuneful songs and scintillating dance ensembles. ... Jack Buchanan gives a characteristic performance in the lead, and it is his versatility and genial personality that go a long way towards putting the bright situations over and blending them into a spirited and riotous whole."

The New York Times wrote, "Although the English ladies of the ensemble are lovely, the tunes quite acceptable and Mr. Jack Buchanan an able and versatile performer, the film never comes off as musical comedy. ... When the piece is being played straight, it is always bright and amusing in a slightly desperate British style... Mr. Buchanan is an engagingly frantic Brewster and he is assisted pleasantly enough by Lili Damita. But Brewster's Millions is more hilarious in theory than in practice in this British rendition".

TV Guide noted, "the witty, energetic Buchanan has a field day with this craftily scripted comedy. The over-produced musical numbers and the elaborate Italian fiesta scenes are delights, as is every scene of this classic example of British wit."
