= Brewster's Millions (1914 film) =

1914 film

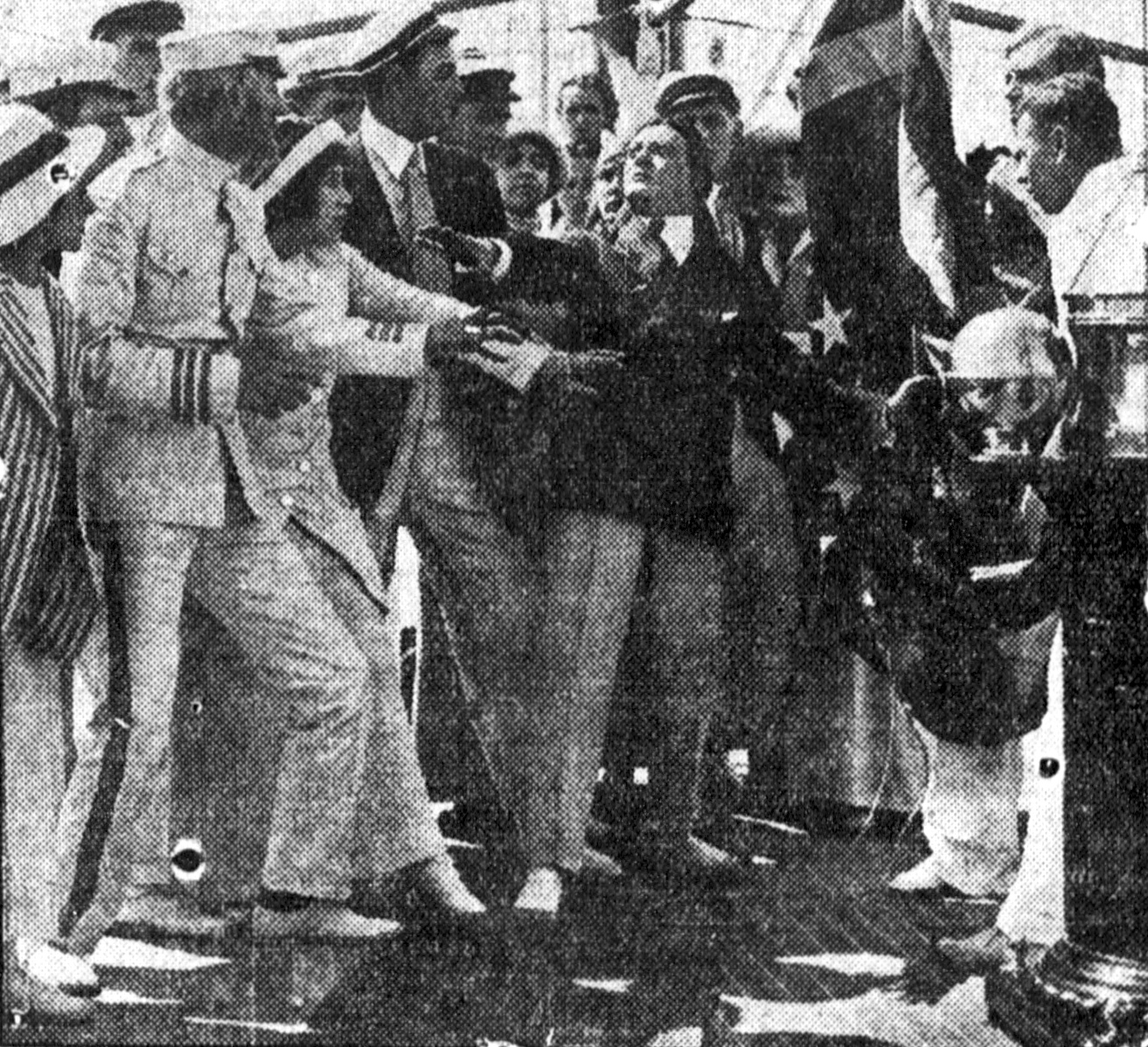
- Scene published in a newspaper.
- Directed by: Oscar Apfel; Cecil B. DeMille
- Based on: Brewster's Millions 1902 novel by George Barr McCutcheon; Brewster's Millions by; 1906 play; Winchell Smith and Byron Ongley
- Produced by: Cecil B. DeMille
- Starring: Edward Abeles
- Cinematography: Alvin Wyckoff
- Distributed by: State Rights
- Release date: April 15, 1914
- Running time: 5 reels
- Country: United States
- Language: Silent with English intertitles

Brewster's Millions is a 1914 American comedy film directed by Oscar Apfel and Cecil B. DeMille and starring Edward Abeles. It is an adaptation of the 1902 novel written by George Barr McCutcheon. The novel had also been turned into a successful 1906 Broadway play of the same name that also starred Edward Abeles. Abeles's success in the play led to his being cast in this film.

Sydney Deane, who played the character of Jonas Sedgwick, made his film debut in Brewster's Millions and in doing so became the first Australian to appear in a Hollywood film. The film is considered to be lost.

== Plot ==
Wealthy Edwin Peter Brewster disowns his son Robert when he marries Louise Sedgwick, a woman of modest means. Many years later, when Robert dies, however, E.P. Brewster leaves one million dollars to their son Monty, a bank clerk. Shortly thereafter, Monty learns that he has inherited seven million dollars from his Uncle George on the stipulation that Monty divest himself of his grandfather's fortune within a year, without revealing why. A further stipulation is that the money must be used only for personal expenditures. Monty spends lavishly, invests in stock and makes a bet on a prize fight, but the bet and the stocks pay off. In desperation he rents and repairs a yacht to sail around the world. At one port, Monty saves Peggy Gray, his childhood sweetheart, from abduction by an Arab sheik. On the eve of gaining possession of the money, Monty proposes to Peggy, who eagerly accepts, thinking that Monty is a pauper. Then a cable informs Monty that Swearengen Jones, his uncle's executor, has absconded with the fortune. Unperturbed, Peggy and Monty marry but then are presented with the inheritance as a wedding present by Jones, who turns out to be a practical joker.

== Cast ==
- Edward Abeles as Robert Brewster / Monty Brewster
- Joseph Singleton as Edwin Peter Brewster
- Sydney Deane as Jonas Sedgwick
- Miss Bartholomew as Louise Sedgwick
- Mabel Van Buren as Mrs. Gray
- James MacGregor as John Harrison
- Dick La Reno as Swearengen Jones / The Sheik
- Baby La Reno as Monty Brewster, age 5
- "Baby" Carmen De Rue as Peggy Gray, age 5 (as Baby De Rue)
- Winifred Kingston as Peggy Gray
- Bernadine Zuber as Barbara Drew
- Monroe Salisbury as Noppier Harrison
- Maureen Rasmussen as Trixie, the actress
