= Vera McCord =

American actress

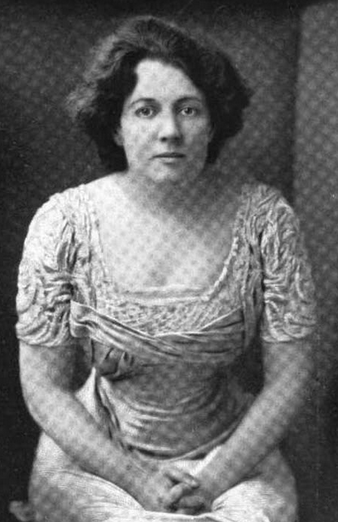
- McCord in 1911
- Born: 1872; Marshalltown, Iowa, U.S.
- Died: March 3, 1949 (aged 76–77); Bellevue Hospital, New York City, U.S.
- Occupations: Actress, screenwriter, film director
- Years active: 1902–1940

Vera McCord (born c.1872 — March 3, 1949) was an American stage actress. She also wrote, directed and produced a silent film, The Good-Bad Wife (1921).

== Early life ==
Vera McCord was born in Marshalltown, Iowa (the date varies in sources), the daughter of George Brown McCord and Clara Sophrona Smalley McCord. Her father was a veteran of the American Civil War, and her mother was said to be a niece of American president Andrew Jackson. She moved to Oakland, California with her family as a girl, and attended Snell's Women's Seminary in Berkeley, California.

== Career ==
=== Stage ===
McCord began acting during an extended visit to London. She performed in The President (1902) and When We Were Twenty-One (1903), and gave dramatic recitations there. She appeared in three plays on Broadway: Via Wireless (1908-1909) with Edwin Arden, The Flag Lieutenant (1909), and The Zebra (1911). Of her 1908 Broadway debut, the New York Star critic wrote that "Miss Vera McCord is a new leading woman with such naturalness and utter absence of the theatric in her method that she scarcely seems to act at all, so realistically does she seem to live the part."

=== Film ===
In 1913 she appeared in a silent film, Broncho Billy's Mistake (1913). In 1914, she was in a play in Salt Lake City, Just Like a Woman. In 1916 she made films with dancer and artist Lolita Perine, Mona, the Spirit of the Heights and The Lure of Venus, which included scenes of female nudity, "Venus, clothed only in the crystal atmosphere of Marin County," as one San Francisco newspaper explained. The scenes were cut and the films went unfinished in the legal entanglements that followed.

She formed her own production company in 1917, and directed and produced one silent film, The Good-Bad Wife (1921), based on "The Wild Fawn", a story by Mary Imlay Taylor. The film was considered controversial for its focus on a woman who wears dresses, smokes, and attempts suicide, but still finds a happy resolution in a respectable second marriage. The film's cast also includes two African-American comedians (Pauline Dempsey and J. Wesley Jenkins) and a Chinese actress (Moe Lee).

=== Later activities ===
She was founder and president of the National Club for Better Movies. Later in life, she taught speech and acting. She bought the rights to the dramatic adaptation of Booth Tarkington's The Man on Horseback in 1940, a show she had performed in San Francisco in 1912.

== Personal life ==
In 1929 McCord sued a wealthy Chicago banker, Maurice Rothschild, for breach of promise, contending that he promised to marry her and then did not. She lost the suit in 1931, after her brother testified for the defense that "his sister was inclined to drink to excess". She denied his claim that she drank too much, saying "I have my brother to blame for everything. I have never been drunk in my life." McCord died at New York's Bellevue Hospital in 1949, "after a long illness", according to her New York Times obituary.
