= Brewster's Millions =

1902 comedic novel by George Barr McCutcheon

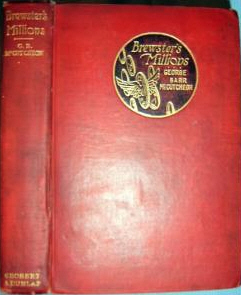
- First edition cover
- Author: George Barr McCutcheon
- Language: English
- Genre: Comedy novel
- Publisher: Grosset & Dunlap
- Publication date: 1902
- Publication place: United States
- Media type: Print (hardback & paperback)
- OCLC: 288834
- Text: Brewster's Millions at Wikisource

Brewster's Millions is a comedic novel written by George Barr McCutcheon in 1902, originally under the pseudonym of Richard Greaves.

The plot concerns a young man whose grandfather leaves him $1 million in a will, but a competing will from another relative requires he must spend the $1 million in the first year or forfeit a $7 million inheritance from the other relative.

Following a 1906 Broadway stage adaptation of the same name, the story has spawned over a dozen film adaptations.

== Plot summary ==
The novel revolves around Montgomery Brewster, a young man who inherits one million dollars from his wealthy grandfather. Shortly after, a rich uncle also dies. This uncle hated Brewster's grandfather, a long-standing grudge stemming from the grandfather's disapproval of Brewster's parents' marriage. The uncle will leave Brewster seven million dollars, but only under the condition that he keeps none of the grandfather's money. Brewster is required to spend every penny of his grandfather's million within one year, resulting in no assets or property held from the wealth at the end of that time. If Brewster meets these terms, he will receive the full seven million; if he fails, he will remain penniless.

Brewster finds that spending such a large amount of money within a year is incredibly difficult under the strict conditions imposed by his uncle's will. Brewster is required to demonstrate business sense by obtaining good value for the money he spends, limiting his donations to charity, his losses to gambling, and the value of his tips to servers and cab drivers. Moreover, Brewster is sworn to secrecy and cannot disclose why he is living in excess. Working against him are his well-meaning friends, who repeatedly try to limit his losses and extravagance, even as they share in his luxurious lifestyle.

Brewster's challenge is compounded by the fact that his attempts to lose money through stock speculation and roulette prove to increase his funds rather than decrease them. He throws large parties and balls, and charters a cruise lasting several months to Europe and Egypt for his large circle of friends and employees; the press lampoons him as a spendthrift. Despite his loose purse strings, Brewster repeatedly demonstrates a strong moral character. At one point, he uses his funds to bail out a bank, saving his landlady's account, despite risking his eligibility for the will. At another, he jumps overboard to save a drowning sailor from his cruise, even as his rich friends choose not to.

Brewster's would-be wife, Barbara Drew, turns down his marriage proposal early in the year, believing him to be financially irresponsible and bound to a life of poverty. His attempts to win her back repeatedly fail, as his attention is entirely absorbed by the requirement to spend so much money. By the end of the year, he exhausts the last of his funds, which he meticulously tracks. He confesses his love to another woman, Peggy Gray, who has been sympathetic to his lifestyle despite knowing nothing about his challenge. Disaster strikes the night before the deadline, as his lawyers informed him that the executor of his uncle's will has vanished after liquidating all of the assets. Brewster convinces himself that he is doomed to poverty, but marries Peggy Gray, who accepts him despite the lack of wealth. Shortly after the wedding, the executor of his uncle's will arrives to inform him that he has successfully met the challenge and that he has come to deliver the money to Brewster in person.

== Film, theatrical, television, and radio adaptations ==
=== Stage adaptation ===
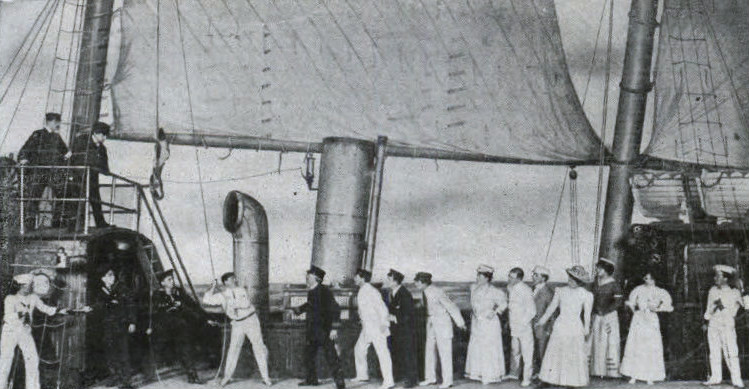
The yacht scene from the Broadway play. Edward Abeles played Monty Brewster on Broadway as well as in the later film.

The novel was adapted into a Broadway play of the same name by Winchell Smith and Byron Ongley. The play debuted at the New Amsterdam Theatre on December 31, 1906.

Opening night principal cast:

- Edward Abeles – Montgomery Brewster
- Leslie Bassett – Fred Gardner
- Gaston Bell – Horace Pettingill
- Cecile Breton – Trixie Clayton
- George Clare – Rawles
- Jack Devereaux – Subway Smith
- Sumner Gard – Archibald Vanderpool
- Willard Howe – Frank Bragdon
- Nestor Lennon – Colonel Drew
- Emily Lytton – Mrs. Dan De Mille
- Arthur Morris – Thomas
- Olive Murray – Barbara Drew
- Josephine Park – Janice Armstrong
- George Probert – Nopper Harrison
- Eugene Redding – Monsieur Bargie
- Albert Sackett – Mr. Grant
- Joseph Woodburn – Joseph MacCloud

The play was later adapted into a musical, Zip Goes a Million.

=== Film versions ===
The novel Brewster's Millions has been adapted into many films:

Title	Year	Director	Brewster	Notes
Brewster's Millions	1914	Cecil B. DeMille and Oscar Apfel	Edward Abeles	Based on the play. Brewster has to spend one million dollars in less than one year to inherit $7 million. Considered a lost film.
Brewster's Millions	1921	Joseph Henabery	Roscoe Arbuckle	Screenplay by Walter Woods, based on the play. Brewster has to spend $1 million in under a year to inherit $4 million. Considered a lost film.
Miss Brewster's Millions	1926	Clarence G. Badger	Bebe Daniels	Screenplay by Monte Brice, Lloyd Corrigan and Harold Shumate, based on the play. Polly Brewster must spend $1 million within 30 days or less to inherit $5 million. Considered a lost film.
Brewster's Millions	1935	Thornton Freeland	Jack Buchanan	Screenplay by Douglas Furber and Paul Gangelin. British version where Brewster has to spend 500,000 pound sterling in six months or less to inherit £6 million.
Brewster's Millions	1945	Allan Dwan	Dennis O'Keefe	Screenplay by Sig Herzig and Wilkie C. Mahoney. Brewster must spend one million dollars within 60 days or less to inherit $7 million.
Vaddante Dabbu	1954	Y. R. Swamy	N.T.Rama Rao	This is a Telugu film. Has to spend ₹1 lakh in 30 days.
Three on a Spree	1961	Sidney J. Furie	Jack Watling	Screenplay by Sig Herzig and James Kelley
Babayi-Abbayi	1985	Jandhyala	Nandamuri Balakrishna	This is a Telugu movie. Has to spend ₹25 lakh in 30 days.
Brewster's Millions	1985	Walter Hill	Richard Pryor	Screenplay by Herschel Weingrod and Timothy Harris. Brewster must spend $30 million within 30 days or less to inherit $300 million; he is given the option to take $1 million upfront, but declines it.
Maalamaal	1988	Kawal Sharma	Naseeruddin Shah	This Hindi-language version was released in India in 1988. The plot remains the same – spend ₹30 crore in 30 days or less to earn ₹300 crore. It is an obvious scene-by-scene "Indianization" of the 1985 Richard Pryor film with some additional scenes and a few musical production numbers.
Chevalier Mikhael	1992	P.Baburaj	Anand Babu	Malayalam film version based on this story. The basic concept involves spending a large sum of ₹500,000, given by the protagonist's prospective father-in-law, in 7 days to gain the hand of his daughter in marriage.
Arunachalam	1997	Sundar C	Rajinikanth	An Indian Tamil film based also on the Brewster story, with significant differences from earlier versions, particularly in the first half. Many plotlines are interwoven, but the basic concept, spending ₹30 crore in 30 days to inherit ₹3000 crore, remains the same.
Tô Ryca!	2016	Pedro Antônio	Samantha Schmütz	A Brazilian film. As in the Richard Pryor film, Selminha (Little Selma) must spend R$30 million in 30 days to inherit her uncle's fortune of R$300 million without keeping anything or telling anybody.
Hello Mr. Billionaire	2018	Yán Fēi	Shen Teng	A Chinese film based on the Brewster story with numerous, subtle differences from the 1985 version. A key difference is a "test" towards the end of the film to break the rules of spending to save the life of a romantic interest and forfeit the larger inheritance. The benefactor designed the test to be staged near the end of the 30-day test to determine if the money had changed his grandson's compassion for humanity.
Brewster's Millions: Christmas	2024	Patricia Cuffie-Jones	China Anne McClain	A sequel to the 1985 American film.

=== Television adaptation ===
In the TV episode "Punky's Millions", from the animated version of Punky Brewster, Punky and her father Henry appear on a TV show trying to win the $40 million prize. To claim the grand prize, they must spend $1,000,000 in 48 hours. To make sure that the money would not be spent all at once on something costly (e.g., a villa as suggested by one of Punky's friends), a rule states that the money cannot be used to buy any single item for more than $10,000. Also, every single item purchased must be donated. When the deadline passes, Punky and Henry seem to have won, but one of Punky's friends, Allen, forgot to spend the 98 cents he got as change when he bought chocolate, so they lose the game. Fortunately, they had been donating their purchases to a local orphanage, and one of the dollars they spent was on a lottery ticket, which won $100,000 for the orphanage.

=== Radio adaptation ===
On February 15, 1937, the Lux Radio Theatre presented a one-hour version of the play starring Jack Benny. The show was modified for Benny: the title character in this version is named Jack Benjamin Brewster; and the character opens the play's first scene by playing Benny's theme song, "Love in Bloom", on the violin.

Playing opposite Benny is his real-life wife and the co-star of his long-running radio show, Mary Livingstone. Livingstone plays Brewster's girlfriend, here referred to as Mary Gray.

The casting of Benny as a character who must spend money was considered humorous in itself, as it contrasted sharply with Benny's well-known radio persona as a miser.

== See also ==
- "The Million Pound Bank Note", an 1893 short story with a similar premise, written by Mark Twain.
