= Brewster's Millions: Christmas =

2024 American film by Patricia Cuffie-Jones

- Directed by: Patricia Cuffie-Jones
- Written by: Patricia Cuffie-Jones; Joseph Nasser
- Produced by: Nicholas Nasser; Matthew Joseph Nasser; Danial Nasser; Joseph Nasser
- Starring: China Anne McClain; Romeo Miller; Rain Pryor; Tequan Richmond; Sierra McClain; Telma Hopkins; Richard Pryor Jr.
- Edited by: Victor V. Hogan II
- Music by: Kent Rock
- Production company: Starbound Studios
- Distributed by: BET+
- Release date: December 5, 2024
- Country: United States
- Language: English

Brewster's Millions: Christmas is an American Christmas family film written and directed by Patricia Cuffie-Jones. It is a sequel for the 1985 comedy film Brewster's Millions starring Richard Pryor and based on the 1902 novel of the same name by George Barr McCutcheon. It stars China Anne McClain and Romeo Miller. The character of Montgomery Brewster is portrayed by Richard Pryor's son, Richard Pryor Jr. as Montgomery Brewster Jr., son of the Montgomery Brewster which Richard Pryor played in the first movie.

The film also stars Rain Pryor, Richard Pryor's daughter; Telma Hopkins; Tequan Richmond; and Sierra McClain.

The film was released on December 5, 2024, by BET+.

== Premise ==
The film follows Morgan Brewster (China Anne McClain) who embarks on a journey to inherit her uncle Montgomery's fortune before Christmas.

== Cast ==
- China Anne McClain as Morgan Brewster
- Romeo Miller as Andrew
- Rain Pryor as Opal
- Tequan Richmond as Big TY
- Sierra McClain as Toya
- Telma Hopkins as Mrs. Brewster
- Richard Pryor Jr. as Montgomery Brewster
