= Via Wireless (play) =

1908 play by Paul Armstrong and Winchell Smith

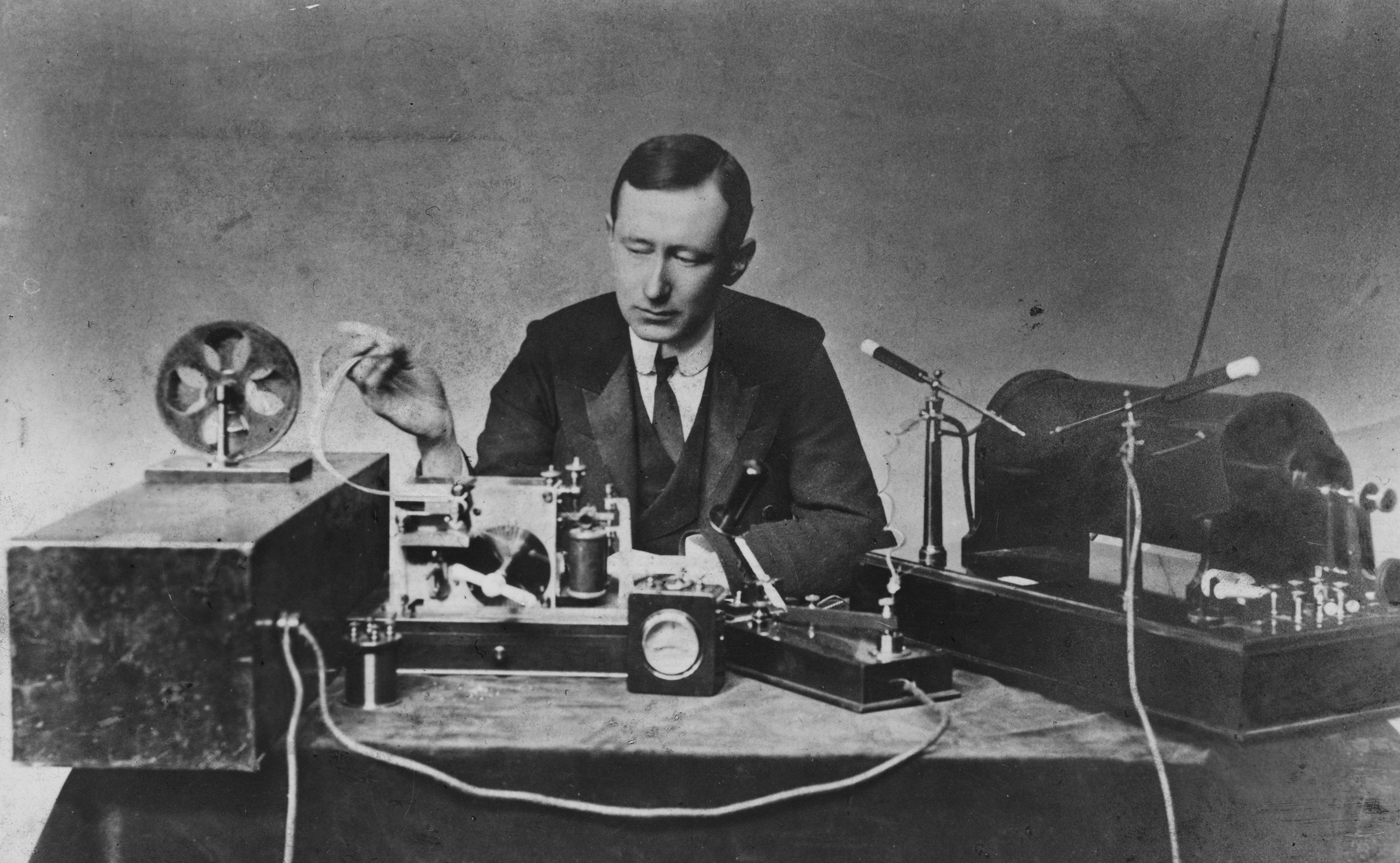
- Early wireless set
- Original language: English
- Written by: Paul Armstrong and Winchell Smith
- Based on: Unpublished story by Frederic Thompson
- Genre: Melodrama

Premiere
- Date: November 2, 1908
- Place: Liberty Theatre
- Directed by: Frederic Thompson and Winchell Smith

Via Wireless is a 1908 play dramatized by Paul Armstrong and Winchell Smith from an original story idea by Frederic Thompson, and incorporating one scene devised by Edwin Balmer and Irving W. Edwards. It is a melodrama with four acts, five settings, six scenes, a large cast and fast pacing. The story concerns a Navy lieutenant who has designed a new marine artillery piece, the royalty owner of a rival gun who wants to sabotage it, and the girl who both men want. The story depends for its climax on the use of ship-to-ship wireless telegraphy.

The play was first produced by Frederic Thompson, and staged by Thompson and Smith. There was a tryout in Washington, D. C. during October 1908. The Broadway premiere came in early November 1908. The production ran on Broadway through January 1909, for over 85 performances.

The play was later adapted for a silent film of the same title in 1915.

== Characters ==
The characters are as given in theatre programs, newspaper cast lists and reviews from 1908.

Lead

- Lt. Sommers, USN is a young inventor who has designed a new 12-inch coastal artillery cannon.
- Frances Durant is the daughter of steel magnate George Durant.
- Edward Pinckney is the superintendent of Durant Steel Works, and Sommers' rival for Frances.

Supporting

- George Durant is owner of the Durant Steel Works and father to Frances.
- Mrs. Durant is the wife of George and mother to Frances.
- Mazie O'Brien is George Durant's stenographer.
- Warner is secretary to George Durant.
- Marsh is a draftsman at Durant Steel Works, who has also designed a new naval gun.
- Smith is a drunken foreman at Durant Steel Works, suborned by Edward Pinckney to dupe Sommers.
- Lucy Smith is Smith's young single daughter.
- Bradley is a Secret Service man investigating the exploding cannon incident.
- Harling is the wireless operator for the Steamship Mongolian.

Featured

- Filkins
- Herman
- O'Leary
- Jones
- Captain Griswold
- First Officer
- Murray
- Wentworth
- Worden

Bit players

- Messengers, Foundry Workers, etc.

== Synopsis ==
The play was never published. This synopsis is compiled from 1908 newspaper reviews.

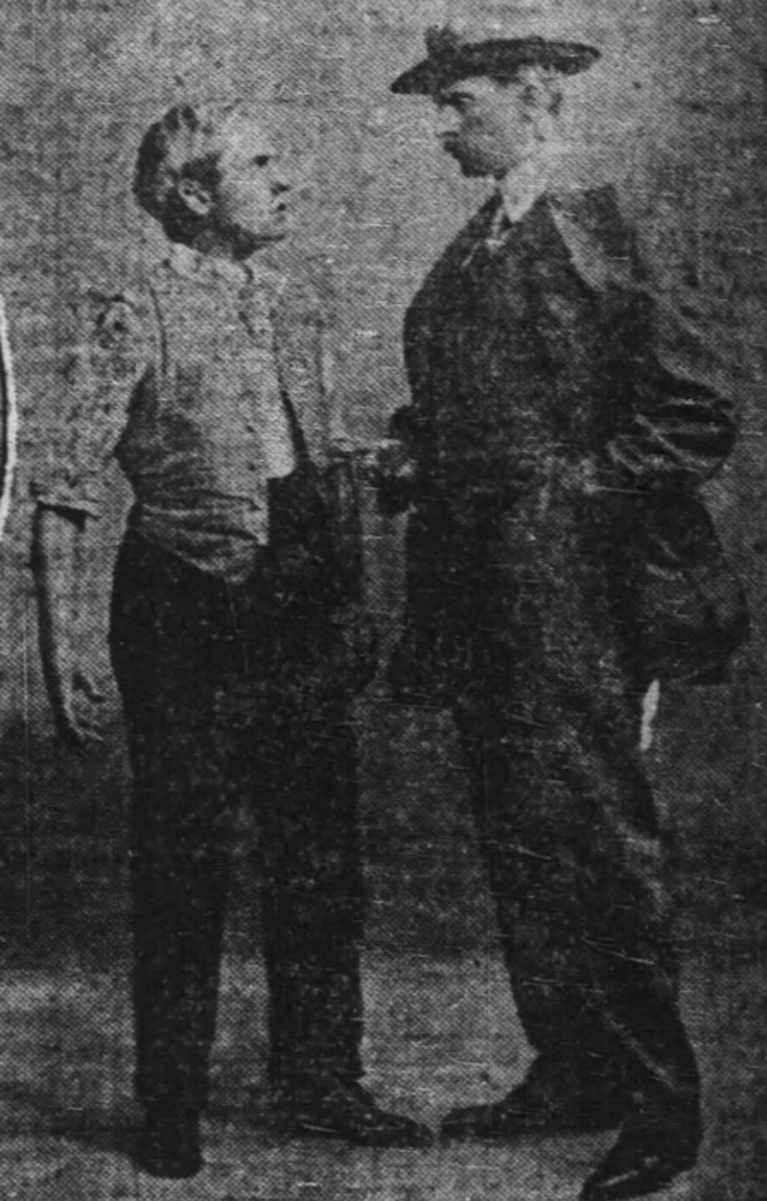
Marsh and Pinckney

Act I (Library in Home of George Durant, Pittsburgh) Marsh has designed a new marine artillery piece which he brings to Pinckney. Pinckney hires an outsider to pose as the weapons' inventor, as otherwise it would belong to Durant. Pinckney gets the lion's share of the gun's royalties, from which he pays Marsh a small amount. Lt. Sommers visits George Durant to discuss progress on the manufacture of his new cannon. While at Durant's home he meets his wife, and daughter Frances. He and Frances express interest in one another. Sommers learns that another new artillery piece has been produced at Durant Steel, and that Pinckney seems to favor it. (Curtain)

Act II (Scene 1:Office of Durant Steel Works.) Frances is told by Lucy Smith that her father is up to something with Pinckney. Frances visits the office, and senses an attempt will be made to wreck Sommers cannon. When Lt. Sommers visits Edward Pinckney to check on the new gun, Frances is already there. Pinckney tries to intimate that he and the girl have an understanding. Later, Pinckney tells Smith to interfere with the oil bath that will temper the new gun. Sommers receives an anonymous message that Smith might try to sabotage his new cannon that night. (Curtain)

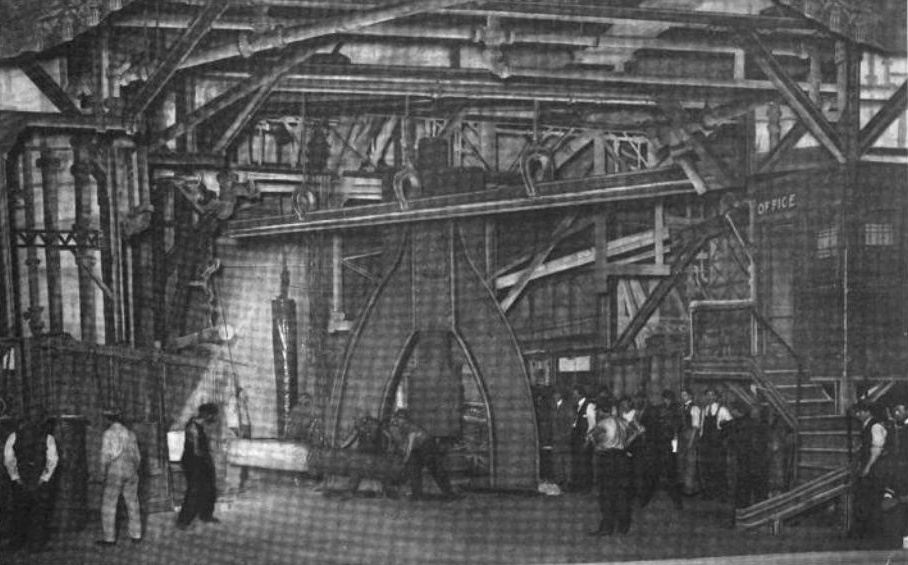

(Scene 2:Foundry of Durant Steel Works, near midnight.) The scene opens with a noisy cacophony; white-hot metal is poured and trip-hammers reverberate. The workers are bare-chested and sweating in the heat of the works. At midnight, the noise lowers as the workers take their mid-shift meal. Pinckney has left instructions for Smith to work on the new cannon while the others are on break. As Smith works, he is accosted by Sommers, suspecting sabotage. They fight, and Sommers believes he has stopped the sabotage. Later the workers return to their labors and the noise resumes. (Curtain)

Act III (Scene 1:Courtyard of Hotel, San Juan, Puerto Rico, several weeks later.) Lt. Sommers and the Durants and their staff had gone to San Juan for a holiday. Word is received that the new cannon exploded, killing seven sailors. Agent Bradley of the Secret Service arrives to question everyone about the weapon's manufacture. Lt. Sommers is ordered to return to Washington for a court-martial. He accepts George Durant's offer to accompany his family, Bradley, Pinckney, Marsh, and Durant's staff on their motor yacht back to Florida. (Curtain)

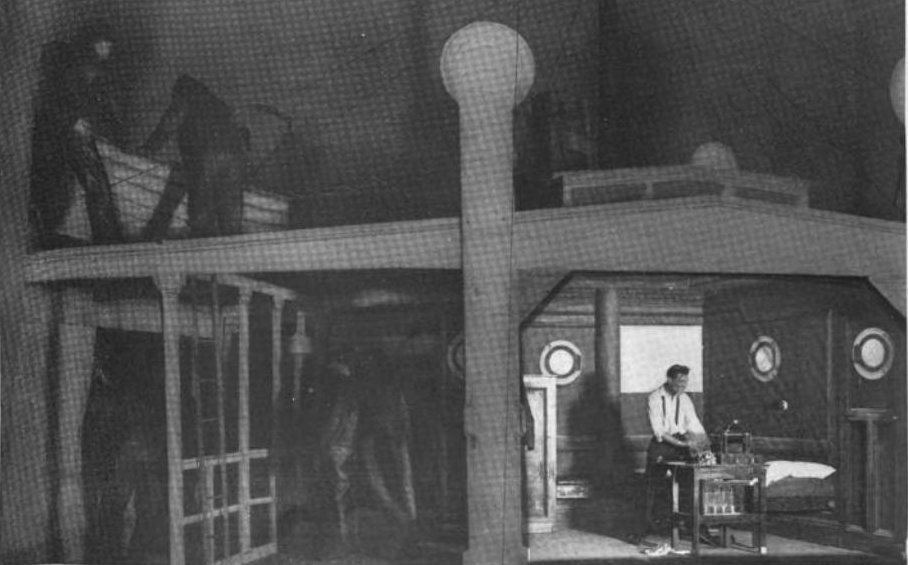

(Scene 2:Wireless Room of Steamship Mongolian.) (Note: This scene was originally a one-act play written by Edwin Balmer and Irving W. Edwards.) On board the steamship Mongolian, wireless operator Harling has picked up a distress call from Durant's yacht. It hit a submerged reef during a squall, and is taking on water. Harling informs his ship's officers, who steer the Mongolian towards the endangered yacht. (Note: During this scene, the Mongolian is itself running through the squall, with rain, thunder, and lightning seen through open hatches and ports, while the stage "deck" rolls from side to side. Meanwhile, the wireless equipment is humming, crackling, and sparking.) Harling relays that the yacht's lifeboats have been lowered, with all but the wireless operator (Sommers) embarking. (For most of this scene, Harling is the only character speaking, as he continually updates the yacht's condition and location). Frances also stayed behind on the yacht to keep the dynamos powering the wireless dry and running. The Mongolian arrives in time to rescue the lifeboat passengers, and Sommers and Frances from off the foundering vessel. (Curtain)

Act IV (Same as Act II Scene 1.) Secret Service agent Bradley has discovered that Marsh really invented the gun Durant pays royalties on. Marsh confesses that Pinckney put him up to it, and that he feels partly responsible for the deaths of the sailors. He kills himself with a gunshot. Bradley arrests Pinckney, and Lt. Sommers is cleared, allowing him to marry Frances. (Curtain)

== Original production ==
=== Background ===
Producer Frederic Thompson first wrote the story in rough form around 1904, but let it sit until April 1908, when he started to revise it. During revision, an unsolicited one-act play arrived by mail in his office. Thompson's play reader brought it to his attention, and he immediately purchased it. Thompson turned both his story and the one-act play by Edwin Balmer and Irving W. Edwards over to Paul Armstrong and Winchell Smith, who created Via Wireless from them.

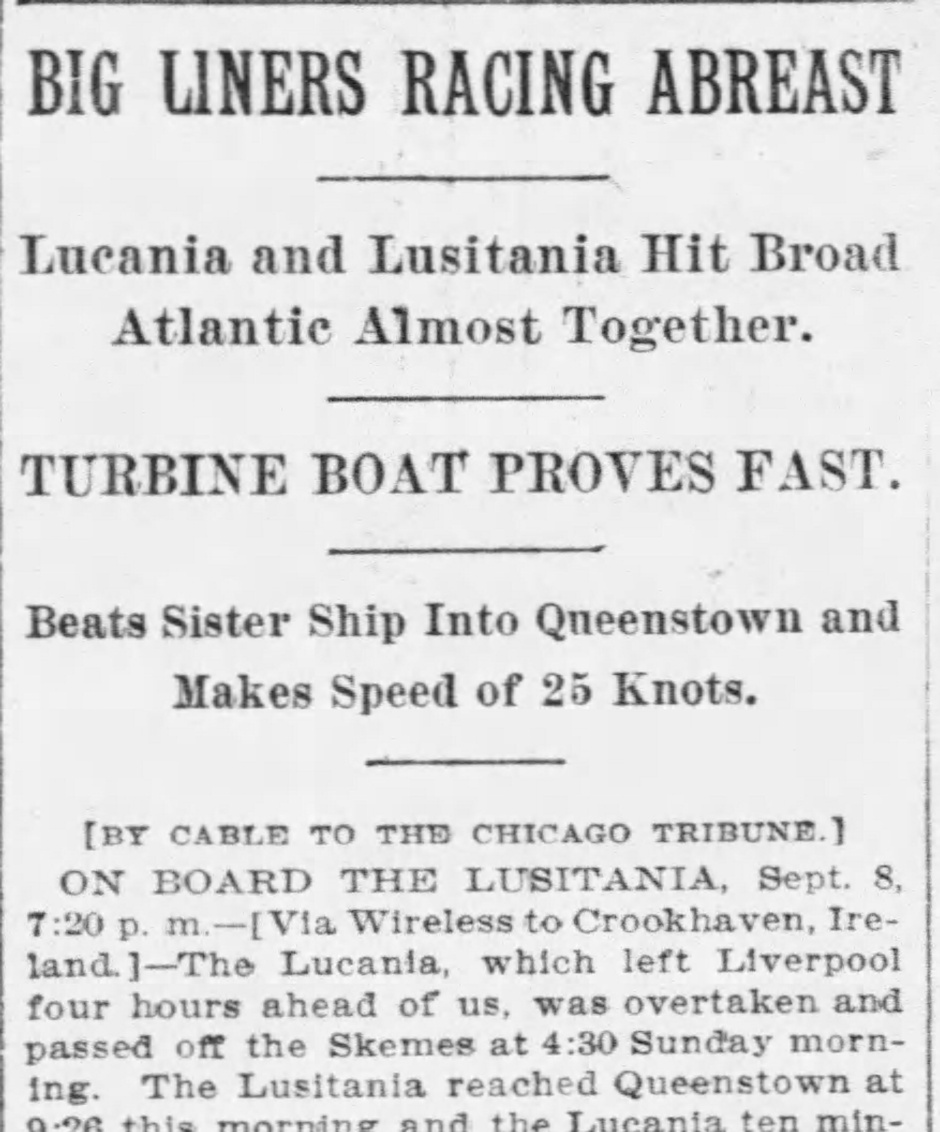
Dateline using 'via wireless'

Armstrong was a prolific playwright, who would have five plays including Via Wireless considered for production during 1908. His first career was in steamship navigation; he qualified for his Master's license in 1890. He managed a passenger line on the Great Lakes before taking up newspaper work around 1896.

The term "via wireless" was well known to the general public in 1908 through its frequent use in the dateline of newspaper articles. This early wireless communication was in telegraph code form. Wireless voice communication wasn't available until World War I, while the term "radio" would not become popular until around 1920. The United Wireless Company supplied the equipment used on stage during the production.

To capture the effects of a steel foundry on stage, Thompson wrangled permission from the United States Ordnance Department to visit three different steel manufacturers currently making large marine artillery. He brought along his stage crew chiefs and a photographer to Bethlehem Steel, Midvale Steel, and the Crucible Steel Company in Harrison, New Jersey. Thompson told a reporter he would use electrical effects only to simulate the pouring of white-hot metal. The scenery was constructed at the Luna Park workshops at Coney Island.

=== Cast ===
Principal players only for the tryout and the Broadway run
Role	Actor	Dates	Notes and sources
Lt. Sommers, USN	Edwin Arden	Oct 19, 1908 - Jan 16, 1909	
Frances Durant	Vera McCord	Oct 19, 1908 - Jan 16, 1909	
Edward Pinckney	J. E. Miltern	Oct 19, 1908 - Jan 16, 1909	
George Durant	Robert McWade	Oct 19, 1908 - Jan 16, 1909	This was Robert McWade Sr., the father of Robert McWade.
Mrs. Durant	Maude Granger	Oct 19, 1908 - Jan 16, 1909	
Mazie O'Brien	Georgie Drew Mendum	Oct 19, 1908 - Jan 16, 1909	
Warner	Walter Thomas	Oct 19, 1908 - Jan 16, 1909	
Marsh	William B. Mack	Oct 19, 1908 - Jan 16, 1909	
Smith	Francis D. McGinn	Oct 19, 1908 - Jan 16, 1909	
Lucy Smith	Crosby Little	Oct 19, 1908 - Oct 24, 1908	
Lucy Smith	Ethel Wright	Nov 02, 1908 - Jan 16, 1909	This was not the American Ethel Wright but a Montreal-born actress.
Bradley	Frank Monroe	Oct 19, 1908 - Jan 16, 1909	
Harling	Joseph Kaufman	Oct 19, 1908 - Jan 16, 1909	

=== Tryout ===
Via Wireless had its first performance at the National Theatre in Washington, D. C. on October 19, 1908. President Roosevelt, his wife, and their daughter were in attendance, as was his secretary William Loeb Jr., and John E. Wilkie, head of the Secret Service. The Secret Service presence nearly disrupted the performance when producer Frederic Thompson got into an altercation with some agents just outside the theatre. President Roosevelt later made up for the contremps by inviting Thompson and his wife Mabel Taliaferro to the White House.

The reviewer for The Baltimore Sun said the production brought into Washington four railcars full of material for scenic effects. Their opinion was "while the plot is melodramatic, it is of the higher form of melodrama", and they noted the President was first to applaud an early line about West Point and Annapolis. Allen D. Albert of The Washington Times agreed it was melodrama, which he defined as "action, not thought", with "little appeal to the mind, and much to the emotions". He called it "a success of the scene painter rather than the author, of machinery rather than acting." Via Wireless closed at the National Theatre on October 24, 1908, after six days.

=== Broadway premiere ===
Because Lillian Russell was still performing in Wildfire at the Liberty Theatre, Via Wireless didn't premiere on Broadway until November 2, 1908. The reviewer for The Brooklyn Times said it was "the noisiest play on record", what with the steel foundry and storm at sea scenes, and yet the audience was even noisier, "a cheerful sign" for a melodrama. They felt, however, that the most effective scene came with the confession of Marsh in the last act, a tribute to the acting of William B. Mack. The Standard Union reviewer said the play was "an immediate success from start to finish", and that after the wireless cabin scene finished the audience applauded for fifteen minutes straight, stopping only when Edwin Arden was compelled to give a speech. The critic for The Sun said the fifteen minutes after the third act encompassed ten curtain calls, and with Marsh dying in Act 4, "When the final curtain fell the crowd wouldn't go away until Mr. Mack came to life and bowed".

It was the critic for The New York Times who identified the "remarkable quality" of the wireless cabin scene: "...during the whole of its action the people you are most interested in are absent from view. Up to that act you haven't seen the wireless operator, and he has not been concerned in any way with the story as it unfolded. But he and you-- the audience-- are now the whole thing in the action. If either of you fail to do your share the situation falls to pieces." He goes on to predict Joseph Kaufman's wireless operator will continue to inspire "audiences to do their part", and further states "the acting throughout is unusually competent for this sort of thing".

The second night's performance fell on election day 1908. Thompson asked the United Wireless Company to install another wireless unit in the theater to receive broadcast election returns, which it did thru twenty-foot aerials mounted on the theater's roof. The returns were posted in the lobby for the audience to view during intermissions.

=== Closing ===
Via Wireless closed at the Liberty Theatre on January 16, 1909, having to make way for a previously scheduled production. It immediately went on tour to Newark, Philadelphia, and an unlimited engagement in Chicago.

== Adaptations ==
=== Film ===
- Via Wireless (1915)
