= Via Wireless =

1915 film

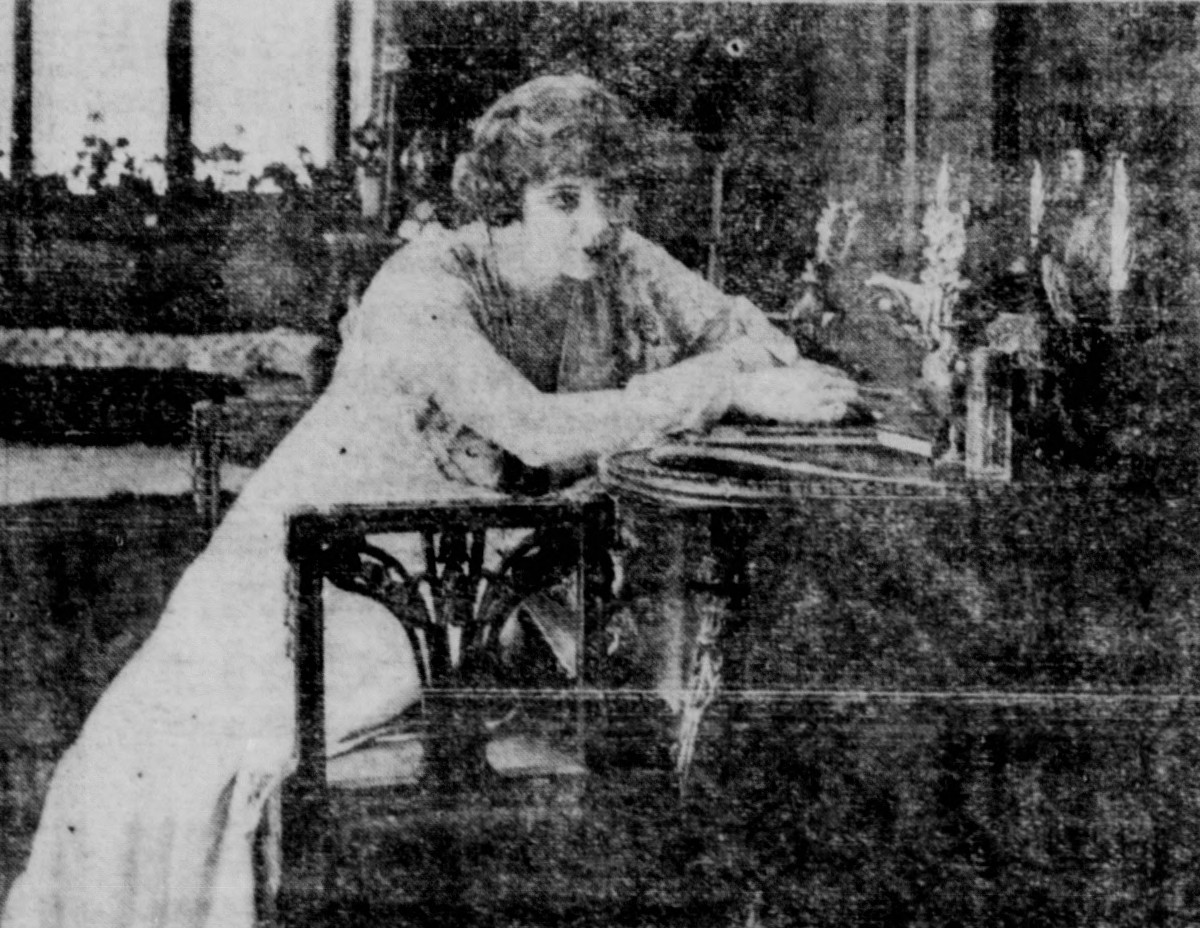
- Scene from the film
- Directed by: George Fitzmaurice
- Written by: Ouida Bergère
- Based on: Via Wireless by Paul Armstrong; Winchell Smith
- Starring: Bruce McRae; Gail Kane; Brandon Hurst
- Production company: Astra Film
- Distributed by: Pathé Exchange
- Release date: September 17, 1915
- Running time: 50 minutes
- Country: United States
- Languages: Silent; English intertitles

Via Wireless is a 1915 American silent drama film directed by George Fitzmaurice and starring Bruce McRae, Gail Kane and Brandon Hurst. The film was based on a 1908 play of the same name by Paul Armstrong and Winchell Smith and was adapted for the screen by Ouida Bergère. Some location shooting for the film was done in Pittsburgh, Pennsylvania and Greenwich, Connecticut.

== Plot ==
The lead character, Lieutenant Sommers, of the U. S. Navy, comes to work for John Durant who is designing weapons for the military. Sommers designs a gun for the man but the gun explodes during testing, killing two people. Due to this, Sommers is being sent home from France to face an inquiry. The foil of this story is the character Edward Pinckney who has eyes on John Duran's daughter, Frances. Pinckney, jealous of Frances and Sommers relationship, is the one who had sabotaged his gun before it could be tested. Pinckney is eventually killed in Turkish waters and Sommers and Frances Durant marry.

== Cast ==
- Bruce McRae as Lt. Sommers
- Gail Kane as Frances Durant
- Henry Weaver as John Durant
- Brandon Hurst as Edward Pinckney
- Paul McAllister as Marsh

== Preservation ==
A complete print of Via Wireless is held by the EYE Filmmuseum in Amsterdam.

== Bibliography ==
- Jay Robert Nash, Robert Connelly & Stanley Ralph Ross. Motion Picture Guide Silent Film 1910-1936. Cinebooks, 1988.
