= Winchell Smith =

American dramatist (1871–1933)

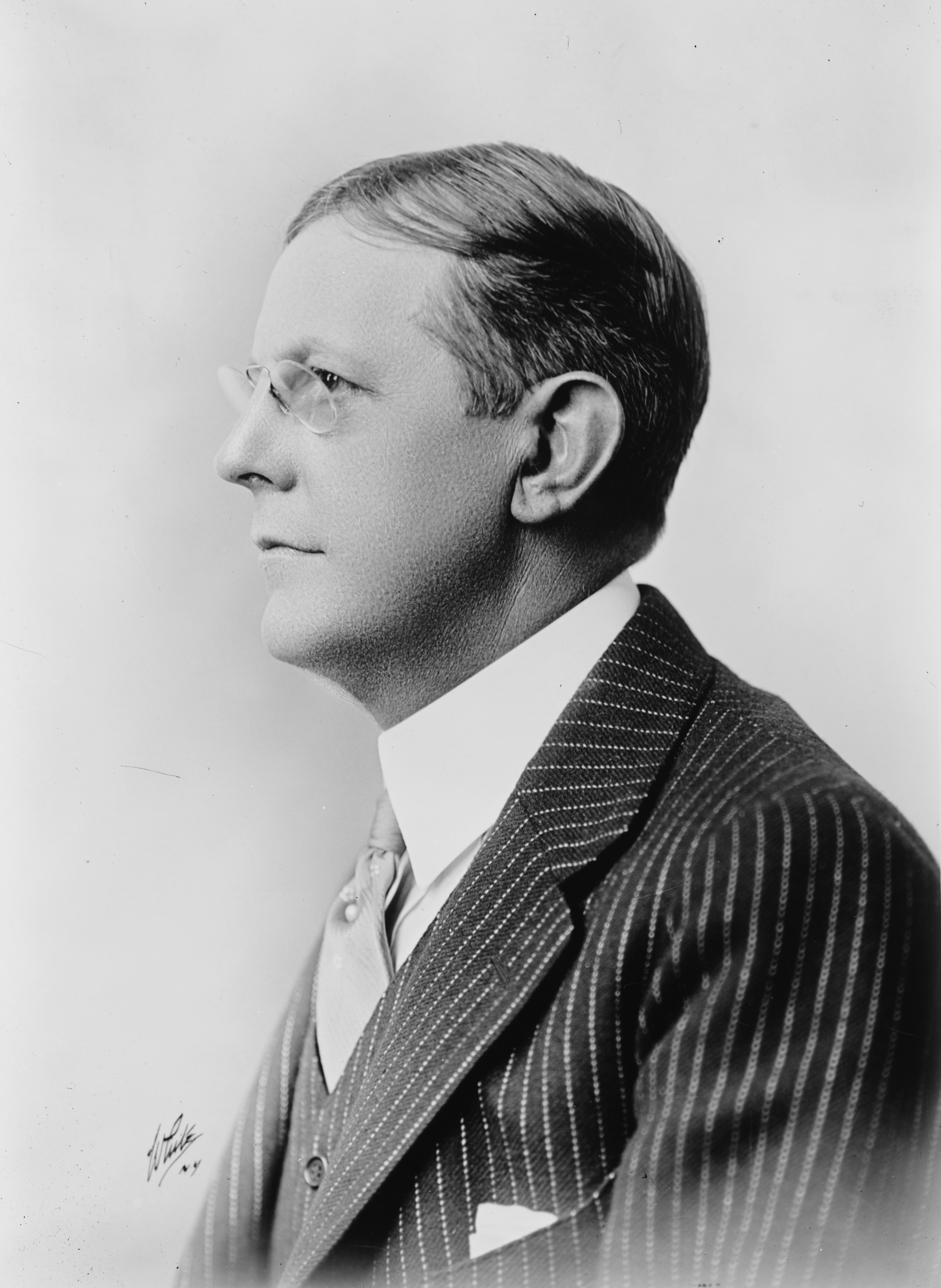
- Born: 5 April 1871; Hartford, Connecticut, US
- Died: 10 June 1933 (aged 62); Farmington, Connecticut, US
- Occupation: Playwright
- Known for: Brewster's Millions and Lightnin'

Winchell Smith (5 April 1871 – 10 June 1933) was an American playwright, known for big hit works such as Brewster's Millions (1906) and Lightnin' (1918). Many of his plays were made into movies. He spent freely but left a large fortune at his death.

== Early years ==
Winchell Smith was born in Hartford, Connecticut, on 5 April 1871. He graduated from Hartford Public High School. He began his career in the theater company of William Gillette, his uncle. He became an assistant property man when he was eighteen, and then stage director. Three years later he played his first small role in The Prodigal Daughter.

== Broadway ==
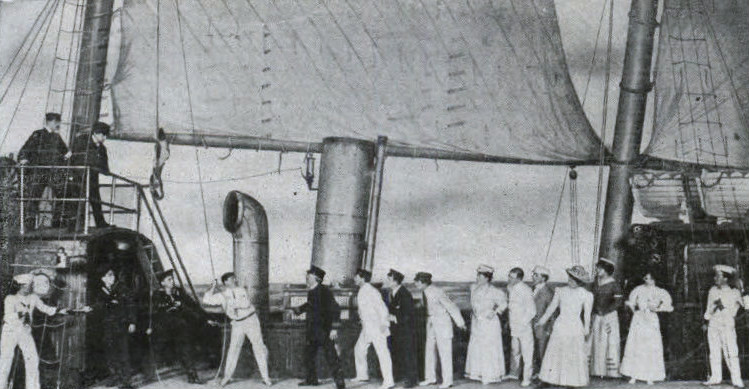
Brewsters Millions on stage, 1907

After twelve years as an actor, in 1906 Smith began a career as a dramatist with a play based on the novel Brewster's Millions. Smith was an assistant to Frederic Thompson, owner of the New York Hippodrome, who had a stage version of Brewster's Millions in rehearsal. Thompson was advised by the successful dramatists George Howells Broadhurst, Augustus Thomas and William Gillette that the play would fail, and the novel could not be dramatized. Smith disagreed, saying it "would make a swell play". He was given the job of rewriting the play, which he did with the help of Byron Ongley. The experts disliked the new version too, but Thompson was persuaded to stage it anyway, and it proved highly successful. (Note: The story is that Edward Abeles, the actor who was rehearsing the lead role in Brewster's Millions, liked the play and wanted it to be staged. He called on a friend to impersonate "George Spelvin", whom he introduced as a great expert on the theatre. "Spelvin" convinced Thompson to finance Brewster. The actor was given a small part in the play, listed as "George Spelvin". From then on Smith had a part for "George Spelvin" in each of his plays. The name became a standard theatrical pseudonym, rather like "John Doe".) Smith often collaborated with other playwrights. In his career of over twenty years he wrote one original play, but adapted or "doctored" numerous hits. In 1913 Smith and Victor Mapes staged a revised version of The Henrietta, Bronson Howard's 1887 success. The New Henrietta starred William H. Crane and Douglas Fairbanks. Smith wrote or co-wrote The Fortune Hunter (1909–10), The Boomerang (1915–16), Turn to the Right (1916–17) and Lightnin' (1918–20), all of which were great successes on Broadway. Smith became associated with the producer John Golden. Smith's Turn to the Right, produced by Golden and first staged in August 1916, launched Golden's career.

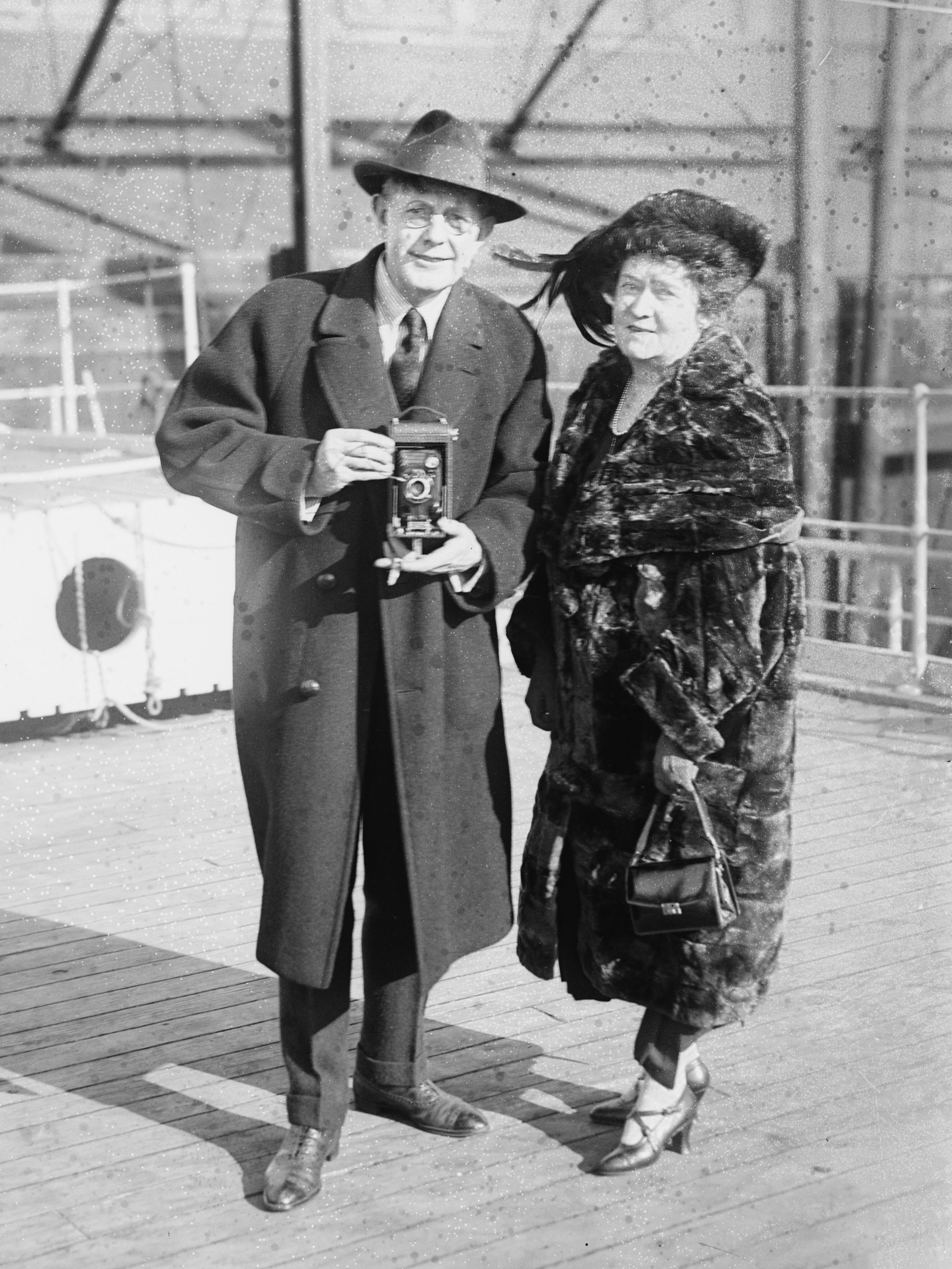
Smith and his wife ca. 1917

Lightnin' was co-written by Smith and Frank Bacon and produced by Golden. Frank Bacon was fifty-five when he met Smith, and had always played minor roles. Bacon had written Lightnin' long before but had never been able to interest a producer. It was a comic play about a rustic character who ran a hotel straddling the Nevada-California border. He is lazy, often drunk and a spinner of entertaining yarns. Winchell Smith saw the potential of the play. He agreed to rewrite it and stage it at the Gaiety Theatre in partnership with Bacon and Golden. Bacon played the lead role. It was first staged in August 1918. A critic said that Lightnin' Bill was as delightful a character as Rip Van Winkle. President Woodrow Wilson attended a show with his wife, and called Golden to his box, where he told him the play was the most entertaining they had ever seen.

Lightnin' played for 1,291 performances on Broadway, a record at the time. (Note: Lightnin' broke the record formerly held by Charles Hale Hoyt's 1891 A Trip to Chinatown. Lightnin' held the record for longest-running Broadway show until the mid-1920s, when it was surpassed by Abie's Irish Rose.) After Lightnin' closed the cast paraded down Broadway to Pennsylvania Station, where they boarded a train for a tour of the nation. The parade was headed by Mayor John Francis Hylan and Commissioner Grover Whalen. Lightnin' played in Australia and South Africa, but was not staged in London until 1925. Smith had agreed that Frank Bacon, co-author and player of the principal role, should appear in the London production. However, Bacon died in 1922. The play was put on at the Shaftesbury Theatre in January 1925 in a production supervised by Smith. In 1919 John Golden arranged a meeting with his fellow producers Fred Zimmerman, Archibald Selwyn, Florenz Ziegfeld, Jr., Winchell Smith and L. Lawrence Weber with the goal of cooperating on common issues such as censorship and ticket speculation. He wanted to set up a forum so the producers could share ideas, and wanted stop the rival organizations poaching each other's stars. This led to formation of the Producing Managers' Association, which may have inadvertently shown actors the value of organizing into the Actors' Equity Association. Winchell Smith continued to work with John Golden Smith decided that The Wisdom Tooth, a comedy by Marc Connelly, should be staged at the Little Theatre in February 1926. When it was tried out in Washington, D.C., and Hartford, Connecticut, it flopped in both cities. However, Golden sent Smith a cable, "We have had plenty of successes. Let's have a failure for a change. The Little Theatre needs a tenant. Try it out for a week or two there". In the event, The Wisdom Tooth was a hit, and played for 160 performances. Later that year Smith's Two Girls Wanted was a greater success.

== Films ==
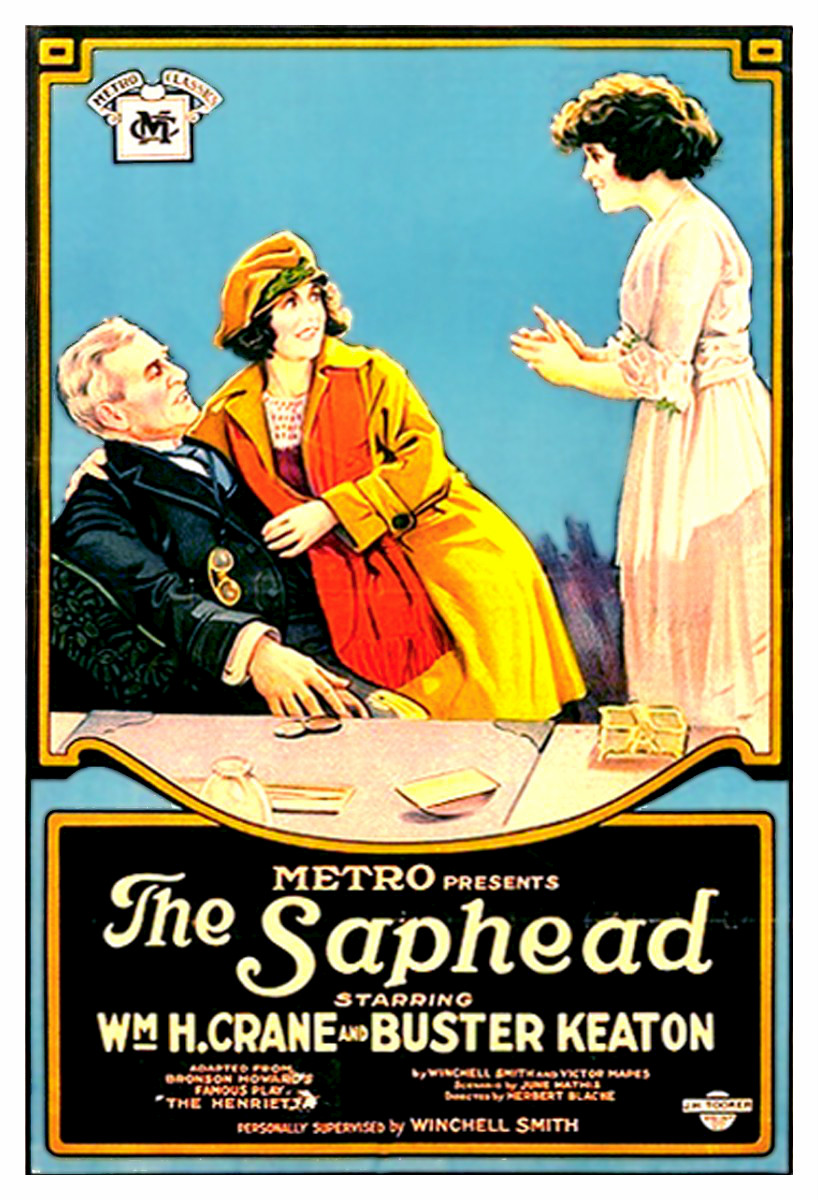
The Saphead (1920)

The Saphead (1920) was presented by John L. Golden and Winchell Smith in conjunction with Marcus Loew. The film was based on The New Henrietta, the 1913 stage hit that Golden had produced and Smith had written. It was made by Metro Pictures, which had recently been acquired by the Loews. The plan had been for William Henry Crane and Douglas Fairbanks, the stars of the 1913 stage production, to also appear in the film. Fairbanks was committed to United Artists, so Buster Keaton was given the part instead. Smith was credited as producer and as co-director with Herbert Blaché.

Many of Smith's other plays were made into films, with Smith given writer credits. The 1925 film version of Lightnin' was directed by John Ford, with a screenplay by Frances Marion based on the play by Smith and Bacon. In 1925 Golden produced the film Thank You, adapted from a play by Smith and Tom Cushing, directed by John Ford and starring George O'Brien. The 1925 Thank You is presumed lost. Another film version of Lightnin' appeared on 31 October 1930.

== Farmington, Connecticut ==
The "Lambs Gate" mansion was built for Smith in Farmington, Connecticut, in 1917, so named because the gates had been purchased from the entrance of The Lambs club in New York City. It was surrounded by an estate of almost 5 acres (2.0 ha). Smith joined The Lambs in 1899 and remained a member until his death. Many of his collaborations were with fellow Lambs including Gillette, Augustus Thomas, and John Golden. Later Smith renamed the building "Millstreams".

Smith persuaded D.W. Griffith to shoot the film Way Down East (1920), starring Lillian Gish, in Farmington. His old grist mill, built around 1778 by the Cowles family and still working at the time, features in the film. Smith wanted to encourage grain raising in Connecticut, brought costly machinery for harvesting and contracted farmers to plant rye, wheat and buckwheat. He was not successful in selling the ground flours he produced in the mill, and changed over to producing ground cowfeeds and middlings.

Smith died in Farmington, Connecticut on 10 June 1933. He is buried in the Riverside Cemetery in Farmington. Although he was known for his free-spending habits, at his death he left a fortune that his obituary in The New York Times described as "perhaps the largest ever amassed by an American playwright". Smith left behind a lasting tribute, the Winchell Smith Fund, which among other things, provides funds for Lambs' members unable to pay their dues or bar bill.

== Works ==
=== Actor ===
Smith started out as an actor. He appeared in:

- The New Clown (Play, Farce) August 25, 1902 - September 1902
- The Two Schools (Play) September 30, 1902 - November 1902
- The Girl from Kays (Musical – as "Joseph") November 2, 1903 - March 1905
- The Man of Destiny (Play, Revival – as "The Lieutenant") September 18–23, 1905
- John Bull's Other Island (Play – as "Matt Haffigan") October 9–21, 1905

=== Author and Director ===
Smith was involved in many Broadway productions as an author or director. They include:

- Brewster's Millions (Play, Comedy – Director and author) December 31, 1906 - Closing date unknown
- Mrs. Warren's Profession (Play, Comedy, Tragedy, Revival – Staging) March 9, 1907 - March 1907
- Via Wireless (Play, Melodrama – Director and author) November 2, 1908 - January 1909
- The Fortune Hunter (Play, Comedy – Staging and author) Sep 04, 1909 - Jul 1910
- Love Among the Lions (Play – Director and author) Aug 08, 1910 - Sep 1910
- Bobby Burnit (Play – Author) Aug 22, 1910 - Sep 1910
- The Only Son (Play – Author) Oct 16, 1911 - November 1911
- The New Henrietta (Play, Comedy – Revision of original play) December 22, 1913 - February 1914
- The Boomerang (Play, Comedy – Author) Aug 10, 1915 - November 1916
- Turn to the Right! (Play – Producer and author) Aug 18, 1916 - Sep 1917
- Lightnin' (Play, Comedy – Author) Aug 26, 1918 - Aug 27, 1921
- Three Wise Fools (Play, Comedy – Producer) Oct 31, 1918 - Aug 1919
- Dear Me (Play, Comedy – Staging) January 17, 1921 - May 1921
- The Wheel (Play, Drama – Staging, author) Aug 29, 1921 - Sep 1921
- Thank You (Play, Comedy – Staging, author) Oct 03, 1921 - May 1922
- Polly Preferred (Play, Comedy – Staging) January 11, 1923 - June 1923
- A Holy Terror (Play – Staging, author) Sep 28, 1925 - Oct 1925
- These Charming People (Play, Comedy – Staging) Oct 06, 1925 - January 1926
- The Last of Mrs. Cheyney (Play, Comedy – Staging) November 9, 1925 - Oct 1926
- Alias the Deacon (Play, Comedy – Director) November 24, 1925 - Jul 1926
- The City Chap (Musical, Comedy – Original author) Oct 26, 1925 - December 26, 1925
- The Wisdom Tooth (Play, Comedy – Staging) February 15, 1926 - Jul 1926
- Two Girls Wanted (Play, Comedy – Staging) Sep 09, 1926 - June 1927
- Waterloo Bridge (Play, Drama – Staging) January 6, 1930 - March 1930
- The Vinegar Tree (Play, Comedy – Director) November 19, 1930 - June 1931
- Lightnin' (Play, Comedy, Revival – Author) Sep 15, 1938 - November 1938

=== Films ===
Many of Smith's plays were made into films, for which he was credited as writer. On The Saphead (1920) he was also credited as Director and Producer.

- Brewster's Millions (play "Brewster's Millions") 1914
- The Fortune Hunter (play) 1914
- The Making of Bobby Burnit (Short play) 1914
- The Only Son (play) 1914
- The Lamb (play "The New Henrietta" – uncredited) 1915
- Via Wireless (play) 1915
- The Fortune Hunter (play) 1920
- The Saphead (play "The New Henrietta") 1920
- Brewster's Millions (play "Brewster's Millions") 1921
- Turn to the Right (play) 1922
- Three Wise Fools (play) 1923
- Lightnin' (from the play by Smith) 1925
- Thank You (play "Thank You, A Play in Three Acts") 1925
- The Boomerang (play "The Boomerang: A Comedy in Three Acts") 1925
- The Wheel (play) 1925
- Miss Brewster's Millions (play) 1926
- The Fortune Hunter (play) 1927
- The Love Doctor (from the play "The Boomerang") 1929
- Lightnin' (play) 1930
- Brewster's Millions (play) 1935
- Brewster's Millions (stage play) 1945
- The Fortune Hunter (play) in the Broadway Television Theatre TV series, 1952
- Three on a Spree (from the play "Brewster's Millions") 1961
