= Brewster's Millions (1945 film) =

1945 film by Allan Dwan

- Directed by: Allan Dwan
- Screenplay by: Sig Herzig; Charles Rogers; Wilkie C. Mahoney
- Based on: Brewster's Millions 1902 novel by George Barr McCutcheon; Brewster's Millions by; 1906 play; Winchell Smith and Byron Ongley
- Produced by: Edward Small
- Starring: Dennis O'Keefe; Helen Walker; June Havoc; Eddie "Rochester" Anderson
- Cinematography: Charles Lawton Jr.
- Edited by: Richard Heermance; Grant Whytock
- Music by: Hugo Friedhofer
- Production company: Edward Small Productions
- Distributed by: United Artists
- Release date: April 7, 1945
- Running time: 79 minutes
- Country: United States
- Language: English
- Budget: $750,000 (est.)

Brewster's Millions is a 1945 American comedy film directed by Allan Dwan and starring Dennis O'Keefe, Helen Walker and June Havoc. It is one of many film adaptations of the 1902 novel of the same name by George Barr McCutcheon and the subsequent smash-hit play adaptation by Byron Ongley and Winchell Smith. In the novel, Brewster is a stockbroker; in this version, he is portrayed as a returning soldier.

Louis Forbes was nominated for an Academy Award for Best Music, Scoring of a Dramatic or Comedy Picture.

== Plot ==
Montague L. Brewster, a newly discharged American soldier back from fighting in Europe during World War II, rushes home in New York City to marry his sweetheart, Peggy Gray. However, he has to postpone the wedding after he learns of a strange windfall.

His deceased uncle has left him $8 million, but he can inherit the money only if he can spend a million of it before his 30th birthday, October 13, 1944, only two months away, without keeping any assets. The lawyer explains that Brewster's uncle hoped it would make him so sick of spending that the rest of the fortune would not be wasted. The conditions include not telling anyone what he is doing. Brewster reluctantly agrees.

He sets up his own investment company, Brewster & Company, and hires his wartime buddies Hacky Smith and Noppy Harrison as vice presidents and Peggy as his private secretary. However, despite his best efforts, most of his schemes to lose money become profitable.

Worse, Peggy becomes jealous of Brewster spending a great deal of time with first, socialite Barbara Drew, then showgirl Trixie Summers, even though he is only using them to help squander the million. Smith and Harrison (thinking that Brewster has gone crazy), begin to thwart his schemes. At the same time, Peggy breaks up with Brewster, but her wise mother persuades her to go on a costly cruise with him and the cast of a failed play he financed after Smith and Harrison close it down.

During the cruise, Smith and Harrison stage a rebellion by confining Brewster to his quarters and ordering Brewster's chartered yacht turned around to return to New York. When the yacht is disabled by a U-boat mine, he escapes and goes to the bridge to order the captain to radio for help. Brewster learns that getting a tow from a passing freighter to a nearby Florida port will cost him a huge salvage fee of $450,000. He becomes jubilant, realizing that the fee, the cost of the cruise, and the losses from the failed stage play will use up his million dollars.

Several days later, as the deadline approaches, the penniless Brewster is back in New York at Peggy's house with the receipts of his spending sprees, thinking he has met his goal, only to have his friends present him with $40,012 that they have recovered from his failed ventures. Luckily, he is able to get rid of the money by paying the executor's fee, an old $10 debt, and $2 for cab fare, just before time runs out. Having secured his inheritance, Brewster then takes Peggy out, saying that they have to go downtown to the nearest justice of the peace to get married right away. On the way out the door, he is confronted by a door-to-door salesman. The salesman tries to sell an item for two cents more than it costs in a store. For this reason, Brewster throws him out.

== Cast ==
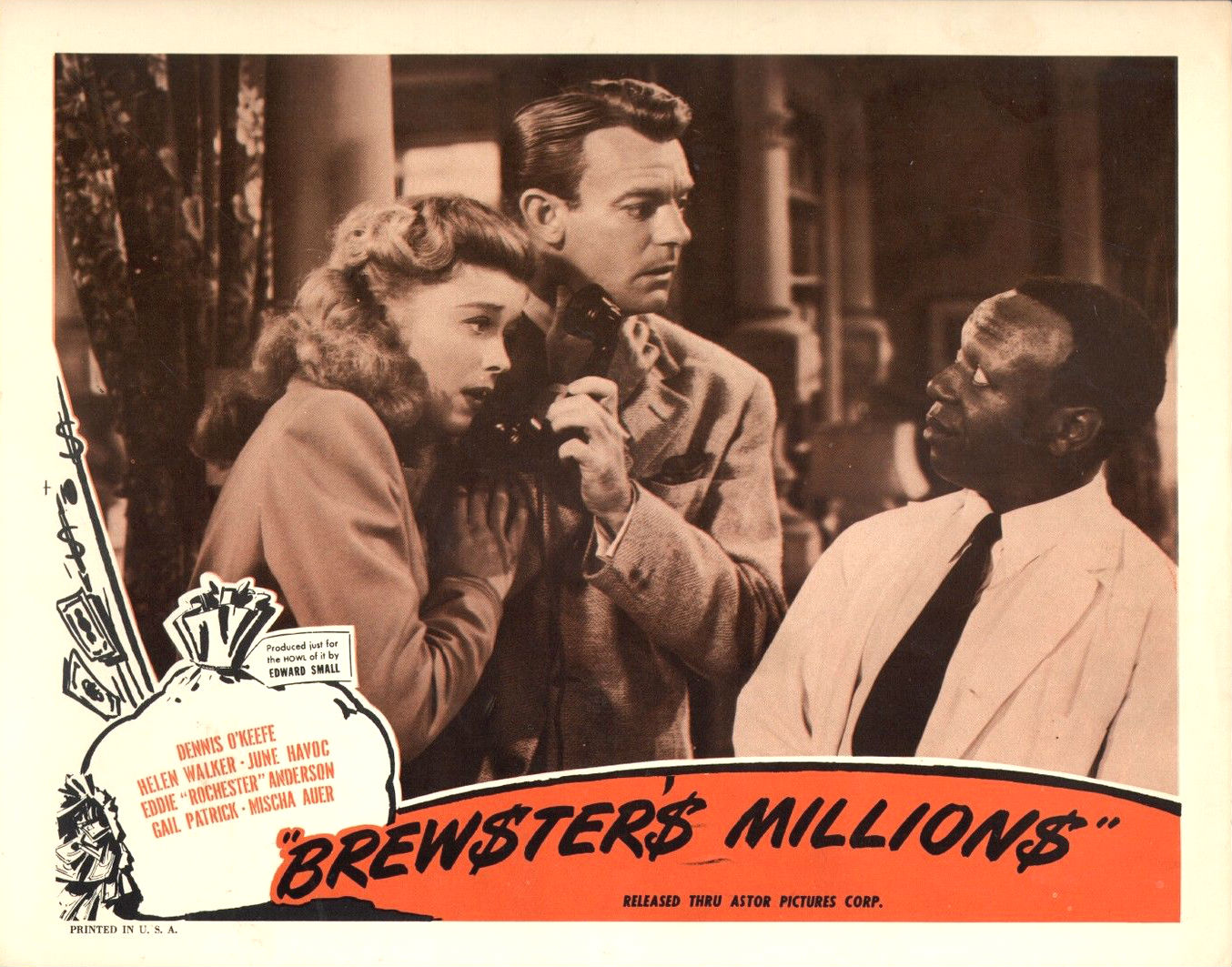
Lobby card

- Dennis O'Keefe as Montague L. Brewster
- Helen Walker as Peggy Gray
- June Havoc as Trixie Summers
- Eddie "Rochester" Anderson as Jackson, the Grays' servant
- Louise Franklin as Jackson's girlfriend
- Gail Patrick as Barbara Drew
- Mischa Auer as Michael Michaelovich
- Nana Bryant as Mrs. Gray
- John Litel as Swearengen Jones, a lawyer
- Joe Sawyer as Hacky Smith
- Neil Hamilton as Mr. Grant
- Herbert Rudley as Nopper Harrison
- Thurston Hall as Colonel Drew, Barbara's banker father
- Chester Conklin as Stage Doorman (uncredited)
- Byron Foulger as Attorney Lyons (uncredited)

== Production ==
Edward Small originally wanted to film another farce, Are You a Mason? and bought the rights from Paramount in 1942 intending to make a vehicle for Jack Benny. However, there was confusion over European rights so he decided to adapt Brewster's Millions instead. He bought the rights in June 1944.

Garry Moore was originally cast but was replaced after one day of filming by Auer.

Allan Dwan called it "probably one of the best pieces of material I ever had" as a director.

== Reception ==
Time Out London described it as "no masterpiece but really quite inventive".

The film was banned in Memphis, Tennessee, on the grounds that it was "inimical to the public welfare" because the servant character, played by African American actor Eddie "Rochester" Anderson, had "too familiar a way about him." The Memphis Board of Motion Picture Censors complained that the picture presented "too much social equality and racial mixture" for Southern audiences, and expressed fear that the film would "encourage" racial problems.

== Radio adaptation ==
The Lux Radio Theatre adaptation featured Jack Benny as Brewster. Eddie Anderson played Benny's butler and conscience on The Jack Benny Program.

== See also ==
- Brewster's Millions (disambiguation)
