= George Barr McCutcheon =

American writer (1866–1928)

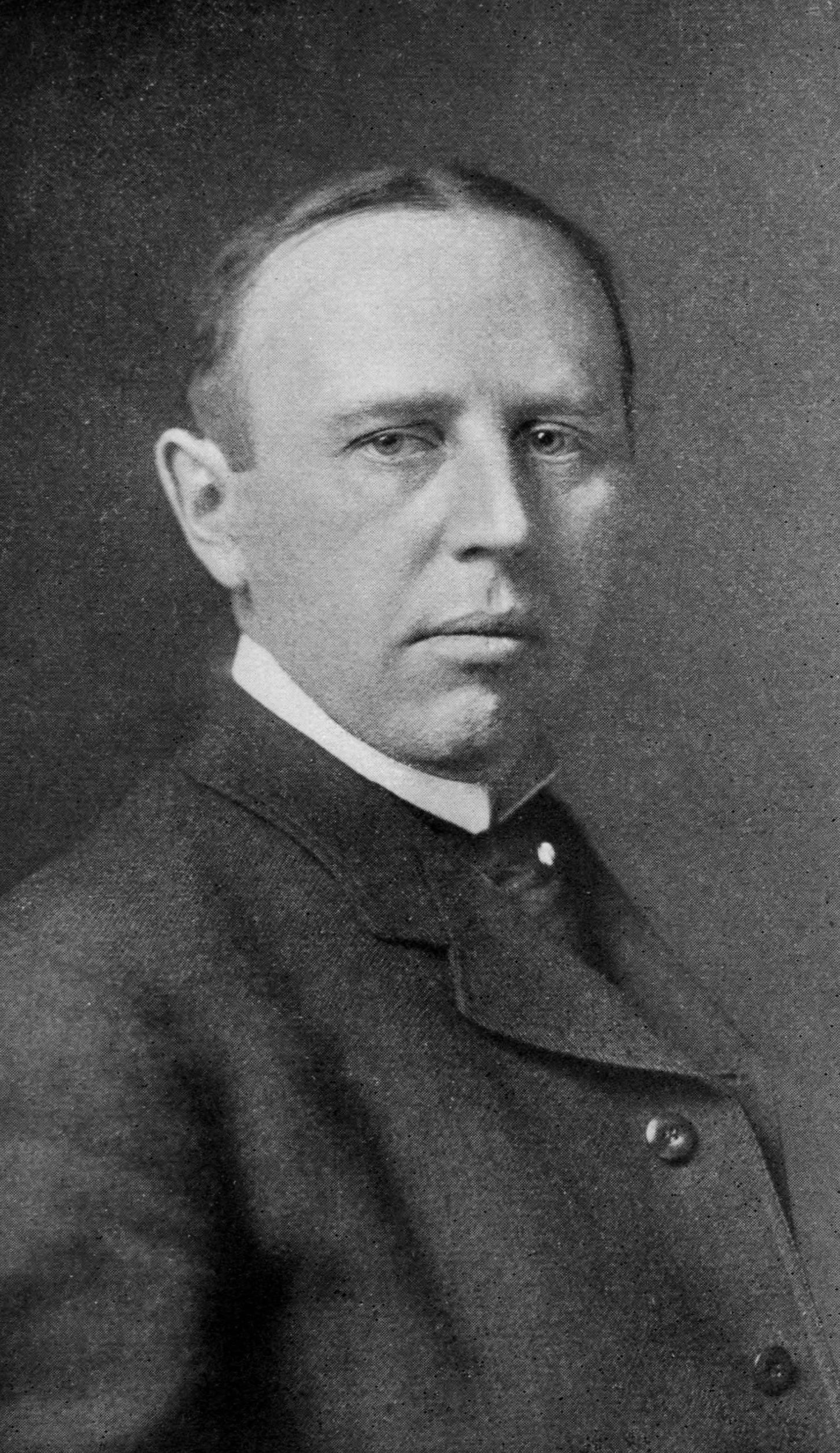
- Born: July 26, 1866; Tippecanoe County, Indiana, U.S.
- Died: October 23, 1928 (aged 62); Manhattan, New York City, New York, U.S.
- Occupations: Novelist; playwright; writer
- Writing career
- Notable work: Brewster's Millions

George Barr McCutcheon (July 26, 1866 – October 23, 1928) was an American novelist and playwright. His best known works include a series of novels set in Graustark, a fictional East European country, and the novel Brewster's Millions, which was adapted into a play and several films.

== Life ==
McCutcheon was born in Tippecanoe County, Indiana. Despite having no formal education himself, his father emphasized the importance of literature and urged his sons to write. During McCutcheon's childhood, his father had a number of jobs that required travel around the county. McCutcheon studied at Purdue University and was a roommate of future humorist George Ade. During his college years, he was editor of the newspaper Lafayette Daily Courier and wrote a serial novel of satire about Wabash River life.

He was the older brother of noted cartoonist John T. McCutcheon and died in Manhattan, New York City, New York.

McCutcheon, along with a number of other Indiana authors of the same period, is considered to be part of the Golden Age of Indiana Literature.

== Selected bibliography ==
=== Graustark novels ===
- Graustark: The Story of a Love Behind a Throne (1901), ISBN 1-4043-5098-5
- Beverly of Graustark (1904), ISBN 1-4179-3249-X
- Truxton King: A Story of Graustark (1909), ISBN 1-4179-0333-3
- The Prince of Graustark (1914), ISBN 1-4179-4103-0
- East of the Setting Sun (1924), ISBN 1-4179-1787-3
- The Inn of the Hawk and the Raven (1927)

=== Other novels ===
- Brewster's Millions (1902), ISBN 0-253-33632-5
- Castle Craneycrow (1902)
- The Sherrods (1903)
- The Day of the Dog (1904)
- The Purple Parasol (1905)
- Nedra (1905)
- Jane Cable (1906)
- Cowardice Court (1906)
- The Flyers (1907)
- The Daughter of Anderson Crow (1907)
- The Husbands of Edith (1908)
- The Man from Brodney's (1908)
- The Alternative (1909)
- The Butterfly Man (1910)
- The Rose in the Ring (1910)
- Mary Midthorne (1911)
- What's-His-Name (1911)
- The Hollow of Her Hand (1912)
- A Fool and His Money (1913)
- Black is White (1914)
- Her Weight in Gold (1914)
- Mr. Bingle (1915)
- From the Housetops (1916)
- The Light that Lies (1916)
- Green Fancy (1917)
- Shot with Crimson (1918)
- The City of Masks (1918)
- Sherry (1919)
- Anderson Crow, Detective (1920)
- West Wind Drift (1920)
- Quill's Window 1921
- Viola Gwyn (1922)
- Yollop (1922)
- Oliver October (1923)
- Romeo in Moon Village (1925)
- Kindling and Ashes (1926)
- Blades (1928)
- The Merivales (1929)

=== Plays ===
- Brood House (1910)
- Mary Midthorne (1911)
- One Score and Ten; A Comedy in Four Acts (1919)

== Filmography ==
- Brewster's Millions (dir. Oscar Apfel and Cecil B. DeMille, 1914)
- What's His Name (dir. Cecil B. DeMille, 1914)
- The Circus Man (dir. Oscar Apfel, 1914)
- An Opal Ring (1915, short film)
- Graustark (dir. Fred E. Wright, 1915)
- Nedra (dir. Edward José, 1915)
- The Prince of Graustark (dir. Fred E. Wright, 1916)
- In the Hollow of Her Hand (dir. Charles Maigne, 1918)
- The Mystery Girl (dir. William C. deMille, 1918)
- Cowardice Court (dir. William C. Dowlan, 1919)
- Black Is White (dir. Charles Giblyn, 1920)
- A Fool and His Money (dir. Robert Ellis, 1920)
- The Butterfly Man (dir. Ida May Park, 1920)
- Sherry (dir. Edgar Lewis, 1920)
- The City of Masks (dir. Thomas N. Heffron, 1920)
- Brewster's Millions (dir. Joseph Henabery, 1921)
- Truxton King (dir. Jerome Storm, 1923)
- The Prisoner (dir. Jack Conway, 1923)
- The Man from Brodney's (dir. David Smith, 1923)
- The Fast Worker (dir. William A. Seiter, 1924)
- A Fool and His Money (dir. Erle C. Kenton, 1925)
- Graustark (dir. Dimitri Buchowetzki, 1925)
- Miss Brewster's Millions (dir. Clarence G. Badger, 1926)
- Beverly of Graustark (dir. Sidney Franklin, 1926)
- A Royal Romance (dir. Erle C. Kenton, 1930), uncredited
- Brewster's Millions (dir. Thornton Freeland, UK, 1935)
- Brewster's Millions (dir. Allan Dwan, 1945)
- Three on a Spree (dir. Sidney J. Furie, UK, 1961)
- Brewster's Millions (dir. Walter Hill, 1985)
