= Norman Deane (cricketer) =

Australian cricketer

Personal information
- Born: 29 August 1875; Neutral Bay, New South Wales, Australia
- Died: 30 September 1950 (aged 75); Sydney, Australia
- Source: ESPNcricinfo, 26 December 2016

Norman Deane (29 August 1875 – 30 September 1950) was an Australian cricketer. He played four first-class matches for New South Wales between 1902/03 and 1908/09.

== See also ==
- List of New South Wales representative cricketers
