= Edward Abeles =

American actor

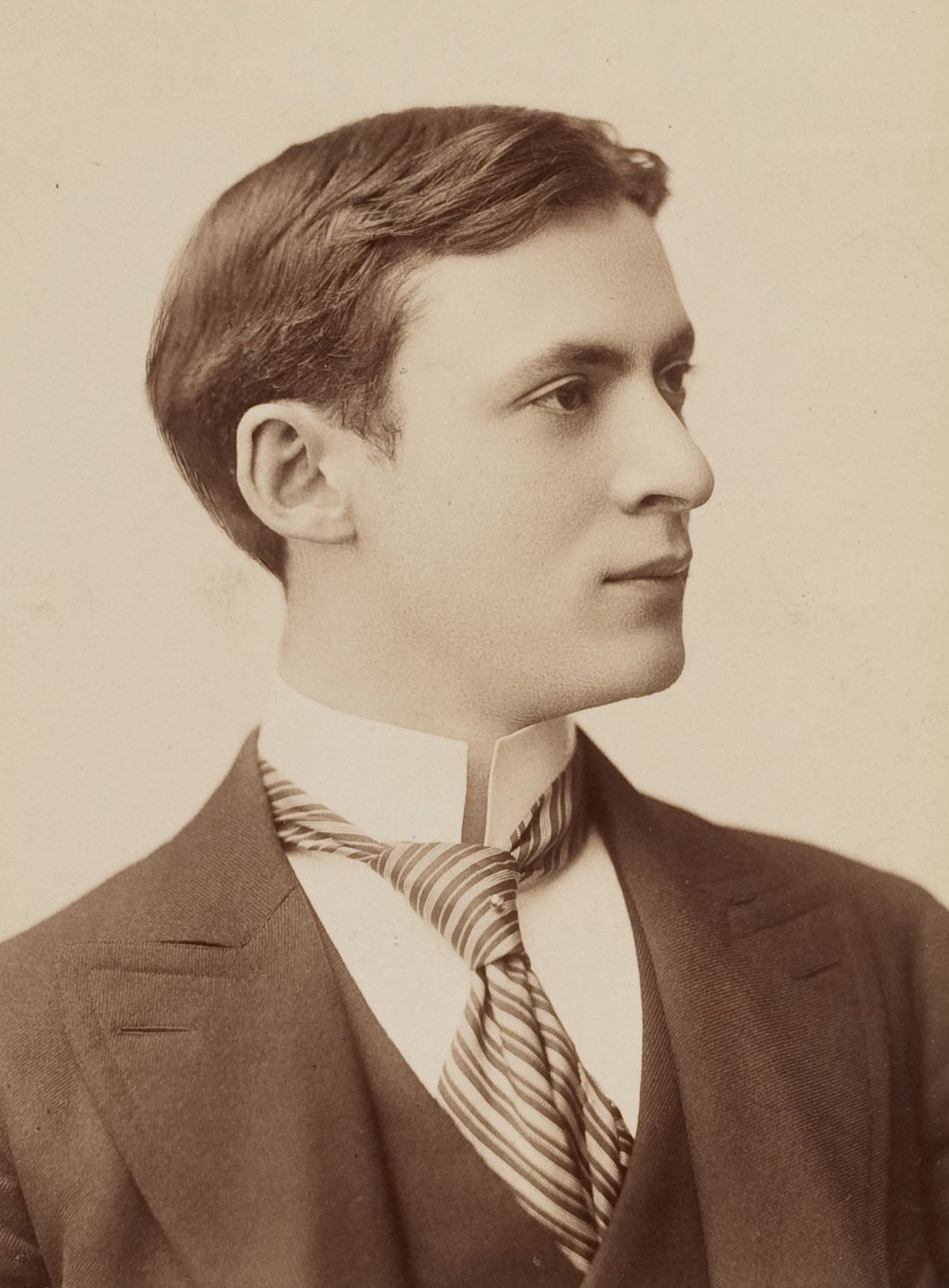
- Cabinet card of Abeles by W. M. Morrison
- Born: November 4, 1869; St. Louis, Missouri
- Died: July 10, 1919 (aged 49); New York City, New York
- Occupation: Actor
- Years active: 1914–1918

Edward Abeles (November 4, 1869 – July 10, 1919) was an American actor. He appeared in eight films between 1914 and 1918. Before working for Famous Players–Lasky, of which he was one of the founding members, he had a lengthy stage career.

Edward Abeles was born in St. Louis, Missouri. He was a lawyer and worked as a reporter before he became an actor. After debuting in the play Alabama as a "tiny southern boy", his early experiences in acting included appearing in several musical productions as "Anna Held's juvenile man". He played roles in about two dozen Broadway shows, including Spike Hudgins in the Jerome Kern musical Oh, Lady! Lady!! (1918).

He starred in the 1906 Broadway hit Brewster's Millions. He later starred in the first film version of the play, directed by Cecil B. DeMille.

On July 10, 1919, Abeles died of pneumonia at Dr. MacWilliam's Private Sanatarium in New York City, New York, aged 49.

== Selected filmography ==
- Brewster's Millions (1914)
- The Making of Bobby Burnit (1914)
- The Lone Wolf (1917)
- Opportunity (1918)
