= Brewster's Millions (play) =

Play by Winchell Smith and Byron Ongley

- Written by: Winchell Smith and Byron Ongley
- Based on: Brewster's Millions by George Barr McCutcheon
- Original language: English
- Genre: Comedy

Premiere
- Date premiered: December 31, 1906
- Place premiered: New Amsterdam Theatre

Brewster's Millions is a play written by Winchell Smith and Byron Ongley, based on the 1902 novel of the same name by George Barr McCutcheon. Producers Frederic Thompson and Elmer "Skip" Dundy staged it on Broadway in 1906. The play is about a young man who must spend a million dollars that he has inherited in order to inherit many millions more.

== Broadway production ==
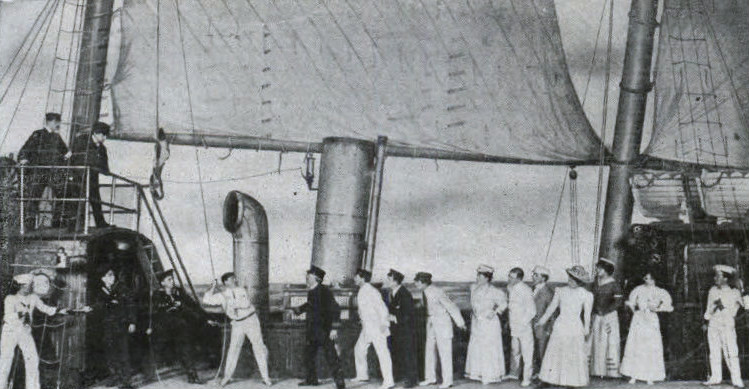
An image from a promotional postcard shows a scene set aboard a yacht.

Thompson and Dundy previewed the play at the Taylor Opera House in Trenton, New Jersey, starting on October 11, 1906. It debuted on Broadway at the New Amsterdam Theatre on December 31, 1906. The production transferred to the Hudson Theatre on February 25, 1907, with the same cast.

The characters and cast from the Broadway production are given below:

Cast of the Broadway production
Character	Broadway cast
Montgomery Brewster	Edward Abeles
Fred Gardner	Leslie Bassett
Horace Pettingill	Gaston Bell
Trixie Clayton	Cecile Breton
Rawles	George Clare
Subway Smith	Jack Devereaux
Archibald Vanderpool	Sumner Gard
Frank Bragdon	Willard Howe
Colonel Drew	Nestor Lennon
Mrs. Dan De Mille	Emily Lytton
Margaret "Peggy" Gray	Mary Ryan
Thomas	Arthur Morris
Barbara Drew	Olive Murray
Janice Armstrong	Josephine Park
Nopper Harrison	George Probert
Monsieur Bargie	Eugene Redding
Mr. Grant	Albert Sackett
Joseph MacCloud	Joseph Woodburn

== Waltz ==
Brewster's Millions Waltz 1908 by Thomas Bulch
MIDI version

Australian composer Thomas Bulch published a waltz by the same name to coincide with a 1908 Australian tour of the play.
