= Screaming skull =

Paranormal object

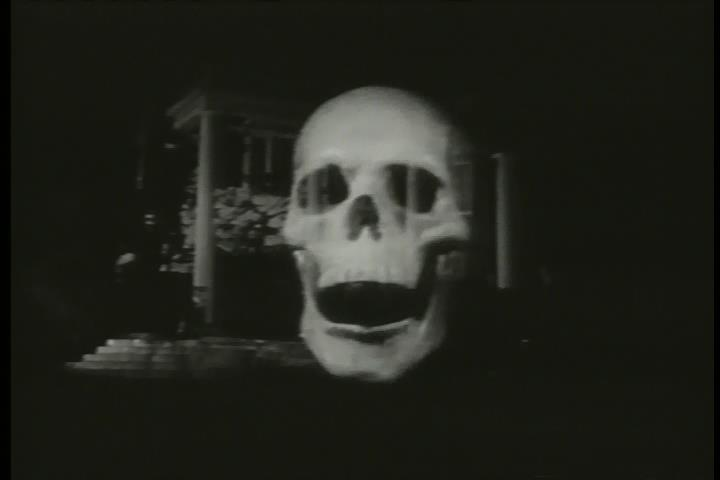
- Shot from the 1958 film The Screaming Skull

Creature information
- Grouping: Supernatural
- Sub grouping: Object
- Folklore: English folklore

Origin
- First attested: c. 1600s
- Country: England
- Habitat: Homes

A screaming skull is a paranormal object, a human skull which per legend speaks, screams, or otherwise haunts its environs. The legend is mostly found in England and other English-speaking regions.

The Bettiscombe screaming skull of Dorset, England, is attested at least as early as 1897 in the book The Haunted Homes and Family Traditions of Great Britain. That book details an alleged visit to Bettiscombe in 1883 by curiosity-seekers to investigate a skull which, according to legend, was of an African slave once owned by the owner of the house. The slave had supposedly died determined to be buried in his homeland, and any attempt to bury his skull elsewhere would cause the skull to scream aloud.

== Reported skulls ==
- Bettiscombe Manor, Bettiscombe, Dorset
- Dickie – Tunstead Farm, Tunstead Milton, Derbyshire
- Skull of St Ambrose Barlow – Wardley Hall, Greater Manchester
- Skull of Anne Griffith – Burton Agnes Hall, Yorkshire
- Skull of Theophilus Brome – Higher Chilton Farm, Chilton Cantelo
- Two skulls – Warbleton Priory ruin, Rushlake Green, Heathfield, East Sussex
- Two skulls - Calgarth Hall, Windermere, Cumbria
- Skull of Neville De Beauchamp - St. Andrews

== In fiction ==
- "The Screaming Skull" (1911) – short story by F. Marion Crawford
- The Screaming Skull (1958) – American horror film
- Carrie's War (1973) - novel by Nina Bawden
- The Great Ghost Rescue (1975) – novel by Eva Ibbotson
- Dying to Sin (2007) - , a Cooper and Fry novel by Stephen Booth
- Cooper and Fry Season 01 Episode 01 (2025-) TV Series, based on the Dying to Sin novel by Stephen Booth
