= For the Blood Is the Life and Other Stories =

For the Blood Is the Life and Other Stories is a 1996 short story collection written by F. Marion Crawford. It is a republication of the 1911 short story collection Wandering Ghosts with one additional story and an introduction by Darrell Schweitzer.

== Stories ==
#	Title
1	"The Dead Smile"
2	"The Screaming Skull"
3	"Man Overboard!"
4	"For the Blood Is the Life"
5	"The Upper Berth"
6	"By the Waters of Paradise"
7	"The Doll's Ghost"
8	"The King's Messenger"

== Reception ==
For the Blood Is the Life was reviewed in Arcane magazine, which stated that "You'll probably have to go to a specialist store to buy [this book] and the translation from the dollar price may vary, but [...] it's probably worth the effort."

== Reviews ==
- Review by Don D'Ammassa (1997) in Science Fiction Chronicle, #192 June 1997
- Review by Ronald Lewis (1997) in All Hallows, October 1997
