= The Screaming Skull =

1958 American film by Alex Nicol

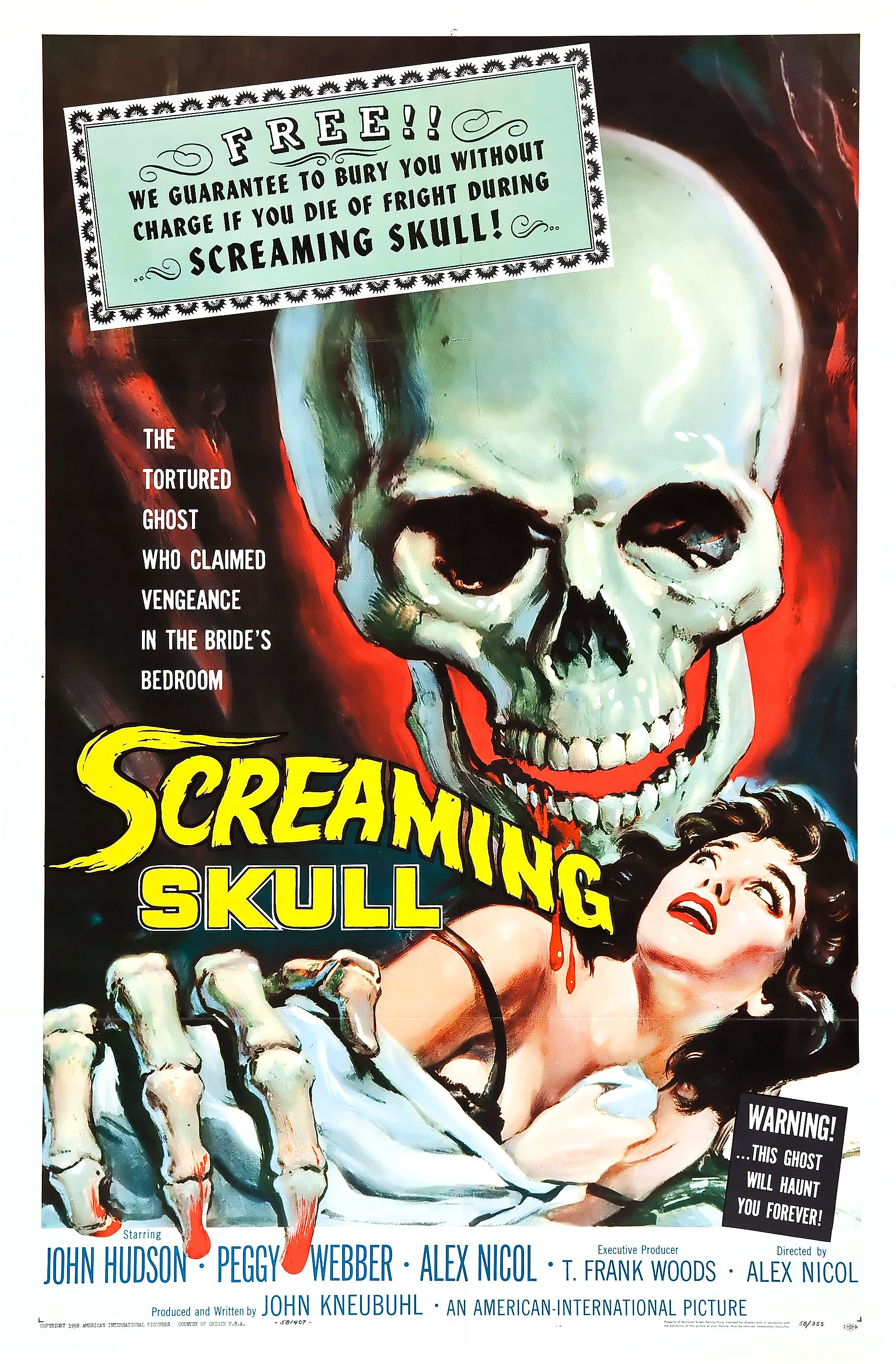
- Theatrical release poster
- Directed by: Alex Nicol
- Written by: John Kneubuhl
- Based on: "The Screaming Skull" (short story by Francis Marion Crawford)
- Produced by: John Kneubuhl
- Starring: John Hudson; Peggy Webber; Russ Conway; Alex Nicol
- Cinematography: Floyd Crosby
- Edited by: Betty J. Lane
- Music by: Ernest Gold
- Production companies: Madera Productions, Inc.
- Distributed by: American International Pictures
- Release date: August 1958
- Running time: 68 minutes
- Country: United States
- Language: English

The Screaming Skull is a 1958 independently made American black-and-white horror film, produced by John Kneubuhl and directed by Alex Nicol, starring John Hudson, Peggy Webber, Russ Conway, Tony Johnson and Nicol himself. The Screaming Skull marked Nicol's directorial debut; he decided to try it because he felt that he was not acting in the roles which he wanted. The film was distributed by American International Pictures in August 1958 as a double feature with Terror from the Year 5000.

The film's storyline concerns a newlywed woman who believes she is being haunted by the ghost of her new husband's previous wife. The simplistic musical score centres on the dies irae.

== Plot ==
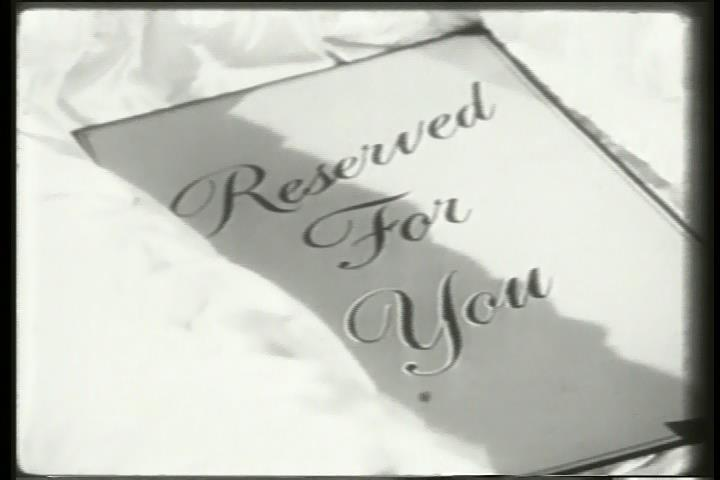
An opening prologue explains that The Screaming Skull is so frightening that it may kill its viewers.

Over a scene of an opening coffin, a narrator explains that the film's climax is so terrifying that it may kill the viewer, while reassuring the audience that should they die of fright they will receive a free burial service. Inside the coffin is a card that reads "Reserved for You."

Newlyweds Jenni and Eric arrive at Eric's palatial country home in a gull-wing Mercedes-Benz 300 SL. It is revealed that Jenni is Eric's second wife: his first wife Marion died when she accidentally slipped and hit her head on the edge of a decorative pond on the estate, drowning in the pond. At the home they meet Eric's friends, the Reverend Snow and his wife, as well as Mickey, the mentally disabled gardener. Eric privately mentions to the Snows that Jenni spent time in an asylum following the sudden death of both her parents, who were also drowned, and Mrs. Snow reveals that Jenni is very wealthy.

Jenni is disturbed both by Mickey's belief that Marion's ghost wanders the estate and by Marion's self-portrait inside the house, which Jenni believes resembles her mother. When she begins to hear unexplained screaming noises and see skulls around the house, she believes that Marion is haunting her. Though Eric speculates to Jenni that Mickey, who was a childhood friend of Marion and thus dislikes Jenni, may be behind the trickery, Jenni worries that she is going insane. Eric suggests that they remove Marion's self-portrait from the home. Eric and Jenni take the painting outside and burn it, later uncovering a skull from the ashes. Jenni panics at the sight of the skull, but Eric denies that the skull is there. As Jenni faints, Eric withdraws the skull and hides it, revealing that he has been gaslighting her all along.

The Screaming Skull

Believing she has finally lost her sanity, Jenni resolves to be committed, and Eric says he has arranged for them to leave that night. Reverend Snow visits, and Eric tells him that Jenni is going back to the hospital. Later, Jenni tells Eric that Reverend Snow, when saying goodbye, had promised to bring people the next day so that the entire property can be meticulously searched for the skull as a last resort. Mickey secretly steals the skull and brings it to Snow before Eric can retrieve it. That night, Eric prepares to murder Jenni and stage it as a suicide. Jenni sees Marion's ghost in Mickey's greenhouse and flees back to the house, where Eric begins throttling her. The ghost appears and chases Eric outside, corners, and attacks him, drowning him in the decorative pond.

After Jenni regains consciousness, the Snows arrive. Mrs. Snow comforts a hysterical Jenni and the Reverend discovers Eric's body in the pond. Some undisclosed time later, Jenni and the Snows depart from the house. Reverend Snow declares whether or not Marion's death was an accident will remain a mystery.

The film ends with Mickey taking some water from the pond in his hand and placing it on his face before saying "They're gone. Rest." A vision of what may be a woman's face begins to appear in the pond as smoky bubbles cover its surface.

== Cast ==
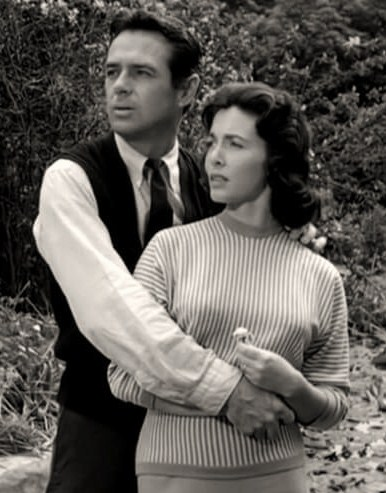
Jon Hudson and Peggy Webber

- John Hudson as Eric Whitlock
- Peggy Webber as Jenni Whitlock
- Russ Conway as Rev. Edward Snow
- Tony Johnson as Mrs. Snow
- Alex Nicol as Mickey

== Production ==
"There wasn't any one director I tried to emulate on that film; I wasn't smart enough to do that. I just worked my way through the script, blocking it out as I went along, trying to get the film shot on time."

— Nicol on the making of the film.

The Screaming Skull was directed by Alex Nicol, an actor who had roles on Broadway productions and often played supporting characters. He decided to try directing a film, as he felt that he had not been performing the roles that he desired. Nicol noted that "as an actor, you're in perfect position, if you choose to do so, to watch the directors you're working with setting up the shots, making decisions as to where to place the camera, and so I picked up a lot over the years."

The film is loosely based on "The Screaming Skull", a horror story written by Francis Marion Crawford, which itself drew its inspiration from "folklore surrounding the so-called screaming skull that was kept on display at Bettiscombe Manor in Dorset, England." The skull is said to have belonged to a black slave who was refused a burial in his native country following his death, and "there were strange occurrences and unexplainable shrieking noises that came from the wooden box in which the skull was kept."

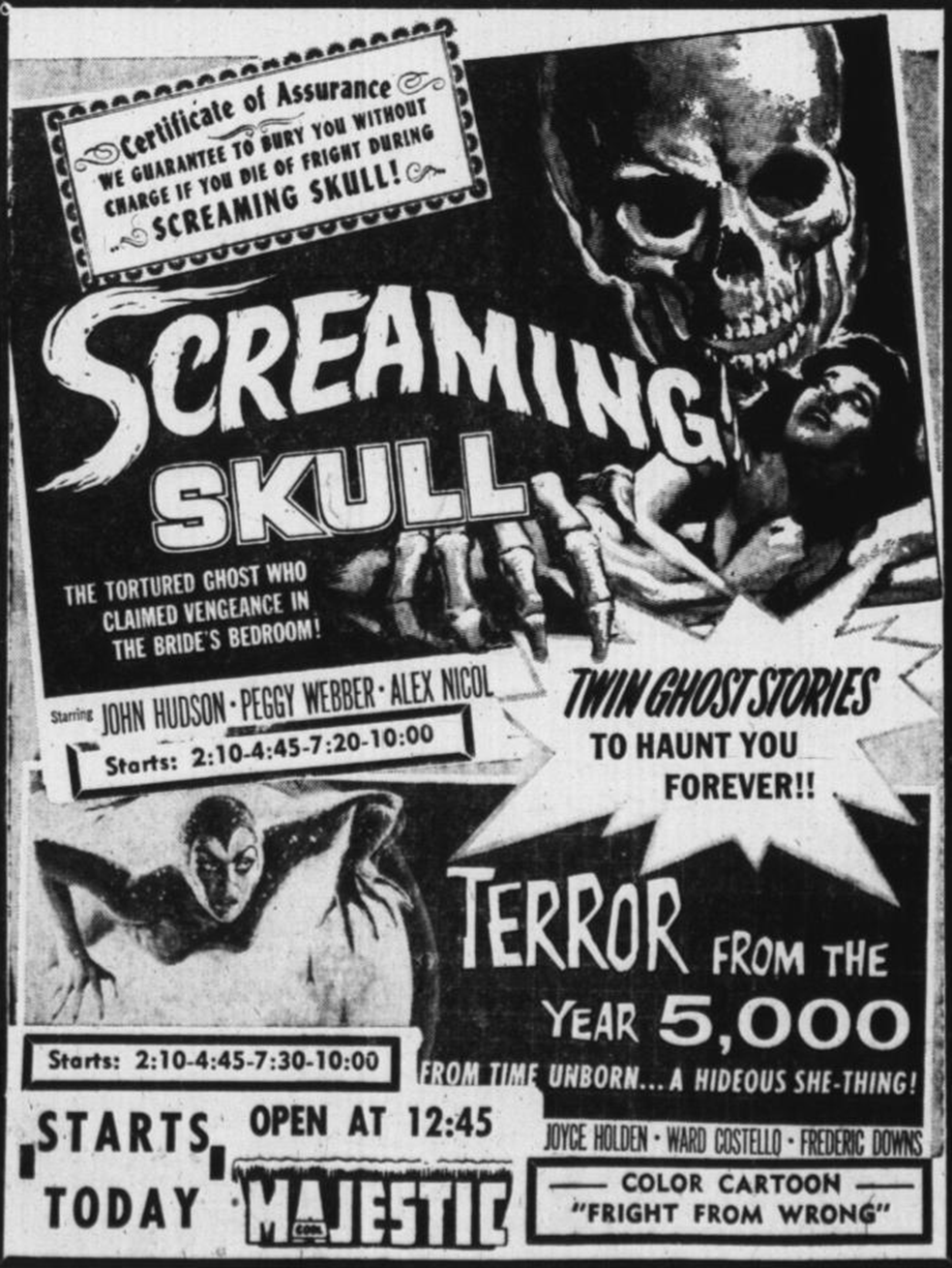
Advertisement from 1958 for The Screaming Skull and co-feature, Terror from the Year 5000

John Hudson stars as Eric, Jenni's new husband. Jenni is played by Peggy Webber. In order to get Webber interested in starring in the film, Nicol told her that he was planning to do a remake of the Alfred Hitchcock film Rebecca and brought a copy of the screenplay to her house. Other cast members include Russ Conway as Reverend Snow and Toni Johnson as Snow's wife. Nicol also stars as Mickey, the gardener.

The film's cinematographer was Floyd Crosby, who had previously won an Academy Award for his work on Tabu. John Kneubuhl wrote the film's screenplay; he also produced the film alongside executive producer T. Frank Woods and associate producer John Coots. The music was composed by Ernest Gold, and the film was edited by Betty Jane Lane.

The film was shot over a period of six weeks at the Huntington Hartford Estate, (now Runyon Canyon Park) on a small budget. The film did not have a large crew, and according to Webber, the actors were paid around $1,000 for their performances. During the production, Nicol promised the actors a cut of the film's ultimate box office earnings, but due to an issue with the film's distributor, this never occurred. During filming, Webber discovered she was pregnant, and so several scenes had to be re-written, including one where she was meant to fall down a staircase.

The Screaming Skull's opening disclaimer that a free burial would be provided to anybody who died of fright while watching the film was inspired by a gimmick that had been used by William Castle in his film Macabre (1958), in which he offered every viewer who bought a ticket life insurance in case they died watching the film. Unlike Castle, Nicol did not actually contact an insurance company.

== Reception and legacy ==
The Screaming Skull was released in August 1958, on a double bill with Terror from the Year 5000. It was never registered with a copyright office, despite the presence of an onscreen copyright notice belonging to Madera Productions. As a result, it has seen many public domain DVD releases by video companies, such as Alpha Video, Echo Bridge Home Entertainment, and Mill Creek Entertainment.

Erick Harper of DVD Verdict remarked that the film was "of questionable value" and opined it was a "truly awful example of drive-in cinema." He believed that the film was not "worth the time to watch." Leonard Maltin gave the film one and a half stars, calling it "dreary," but he believed that it became "reasonably eerie toward the end, with a twist that's actually a surprise." Authors Phil Hardy and Tom Milne wrote of the film: "Nicol, an actor here directing for the first time, lets the action spin out much too slackly, dissipating the grasp of moody tension he displayed in his unpretentiously excellent war movie, Three Came Back."

Film historian Steven H. Scheuer graded the film one and a half stars, writing "Wife is terrorized by unexplainable happenings. Or is it inexplicable? Both describe the film." VideoHound's Golden Movie Retriever by Jim Craddock also gave the film one and a half stars, and TV Guide gave it two. Webber herself did not like the film, stating that "it didn't impress me" and she "wanted to throw up" after watching it. However, Nicol took a more positive stance, saying "I liked it. It had some nice dolly shots, a good atmosphere. So I was happy with that. It was a nice change from the films I'd been doing."

== See also ==
- List of ghost films
