= Cultural depictions of Philip II of Spain =

Philip II of Spain has inspired artistic and cultural works for over four centuries, as the most powerful ruler in the Europe of his day, and subsequently a central figure in the "Black Legend" of Spanish power. The following list covers representations of him in drama, opera, film, novels, and verse. A small selection of the many artistic portrayals of Philip is shown in gallery form.

== Literature ==
- The Belgian Charles De Coster's 1867 novel The Legend of Thyl Ulenspiegel and Lamme Goedzak depicts Philip II in a highly unsympathetic light, as a misanthropic moron given to petty cruelties. The narrative recounts the adventures of the Geuzen, or Sea Beggars, who fought against the Spanish occupation of the Southern Netherlands, and imagines the legendary figure of Thyl Ulenspiegel fighting on their side. Critic Jonathan Nield describes the work as "of unmistakable power, if somewhat coarse in tone".
- In the Palace of the King (1900) by F. Marion Crawford is a novel about Philip's life.
- House of Torment (1910) by C. Ranger Gull follows Philip and Mary's rule of England, and depicts the persecution of Protestants during their reign.
- A Knight of Spain (1913) by Marjorie Bowen depicts the relationship between Philip and his half-brother, Don John of Austria.
- Margaret Irwin wrote Elizabeth and the Prince of Spain (1953), a historical novel about Princess Elizabeth's imprisonment and survival during the uneasy marriage between Philip and Queen Mary I. The novel was the third in Irwin's "Young Bess" trilogy.
- Jean Plaidy wrote Spanish Bridegroom (1954), a historical novel about Philip's first three marriages.
- The plot of Carlos Fuentes's novel Terra Nostra (Mexico, 1975) revolves around the construction of Philip II's combined monastery and palace of San Lorenzo de El Escorial in the Sierra de Guadarrama near Madrid. Critic Raymond L. Williams has explained that Fuentes modelled the tripartite structure of Terra Nostra on that of the Escorial, where Philip consciously set out to create a world apart. The novel makes the architecture a metaphor for Spain's imperial stance towards the New World.
- Harry Turtledove's alternate history novel Ruled Britannia (2002) imagines a world in which the Spanish Armada succeeded and King Philip conquered England, a theme anticipated, suggests literary scholar Anne J. Cruz, by the Spanish novelist Miguel de Cervantes (1547–1616). Among other things, Shakespeare is made to write a play praising King Philip, of which Turtledove provides some excerpts.
- In Philippa Gregory's novel The Queen's Fool (2004), set in the court of Queen Mary I of England, Princess Elizabeth flirts with Mary's husband King Philip. The plot, observes reviewer Emma Hagestadt, "burns with passions with which Freud—let alone the Church—would have a field day".
- Harry Kelsey's biographical novel Philip of Spain, King of England: The Forgotten Sovereign (2011) takes place during his marriage to Mary I and his role as king-consort in a foreign country.
- Winston Graham's The Grove Of Eagles focuses on Philip II's second and less well-known attempt to invade England, in 1596, which the author argues was better organized than the Armada of 1588 and had a better chance of success, but for having encountered a major storm en route. In one scene, the book's protagonist – a young Englishman who through mischance finds himself involved in the Spanish invasion fleet – is taken to the Royal Palace in Madrid and meets with a man sitting writing at a modest desk. First considering him a minor clerk, the protagonist discovers that he is in the presence of the hard-working, frugal King in person.

== Film and television ==
- Sam De Grasse in In the Palace of the King (1923)
- Raymond Massey in Fire Over England (1937); Breaking with British artistic tradition, the portrayal of the former English co-monarch jure uxoris is not entirely unsympathetic. He is shown as a very hard working, intelligent, religious, somewhat paranoid ruler whose prime concern is his country. As he orders the Armada to sail to its doom, he admits to having no understanding of the English.
- Montagu Love in The Sea Hawk (1940)
- Paul Scofield in That Lady (1955)
- Günther Ballier in The Mayor of Zalamea (1956)
- Umberto Raho in Seven Seas to Calais (1962); ignoring the historical union of Philip and Mary, depicts the king establishing plausible deniability while his agents attempt to free Mary from imprisonment and use her to depose Elizabeth.
- Fernando Rey in El Greco (1966) and Cervantes (1967)
- Peter Jeffrey in Elizabeth R (1971)
- George Yiasoumi in Elizabeth (1998)
- Jordi Mollà in Elizabeth: The Golden Age (2007)
- Juanjo Puigcorbé in La conjura de El Escorial (2008)
- Mathew Baynton in Horrible Histories (2011–12)
- Ben Willbond in Bill (2015)
- Marcel Borràs and Pablo Arbués in Carlos, rey emperador (2015–16)
- Carlos Hipólito in El ministerio del tiempo (2016)

== Theater ==
- Philip's marriage to his third wife Elisabeth of Valois, and problems with his first son Carlos, Prince of Asturias, may be alluded to in Lope de Vega's 1631 drama Castigo sin venganza (Punishment without Revenge). In the view of the play's translator and editor Gwynne Edwards: "The relationship in the play between Casandra, the Duke's wife, and his son Federico was not unlike that between Prince Carlos, son of Philip II, and Isabel [Elisabeth] who became Philip's wife and Carlos's stepmother"; Edwards argues that these events were recent enough to have embarrassed the court of Philip IV and may have been a reason for the play's withdrawal after one performance.
- Vittorio Alfieri's Filippo. Pazzini Carli, 1783.
- Philip II is a central character in Friedrich Schiller's 1787 play Don Carlos. Schiller drew his material from the 17th-century novel Dom Carlos by Abbé César Vichard de Saint-Réal The plot follows the relationship between a King Philip obsessed with the Spanish Netherlands and his first son, Prince Carlos.
- The English Poet Laureate John Masefield wrote a verse play, Philip the King, about Philip receiving news of the defeat of the Armada. It was featured as part of a collection of poems called Philip the King and Other Poems (1916).

== Opera ==
- Giuseppe Verdi's 1867 operatic adaptation of the play, Don Carlos, has been called "one of his most human operas". It portrays the King as an anxious, jealous, loveless hypocrite who rationalizes his bloody atrocities, pretends to be powerful but is controlled by the Inquisition, and is dangerous to his family, his friends, and almost everyone else.

== Poem ==
- In his 1915 poem Lepanto, the Catholic G. K. Chesterton commemorated the response of Philip and his brother Don John of Austria to the Ottoman Turks, which climaxed in the Christian victory at the Battle of Lepanto in 1571. Chesterton's poem was conceived as "a call to Christians to take action against the modern forces of unbelief". It contrasts King Philip, occupied with alchemy in his chamber at home in Spain, with Don John's activities at sea:

King Philip's in his closet with the Fleece about his neck
(Don John of Austria is armed upon the deck.)
The walls are hung with velvet that is black and soft as sin,
And little dwarfs creep out of it and little dwarfs creep in.
He holds a crystal phial that has colours like the moon,
He touches, and it tingles, and he trembles very soon,
And his face is as a fungus of a leprous white and grey
Like plants in the high houses that are shuttered from the day,
And death is in the phial, and the end of noble work,
But Don John of Austria has fired upon the Turk.

== Art ==
=== Portraits ===
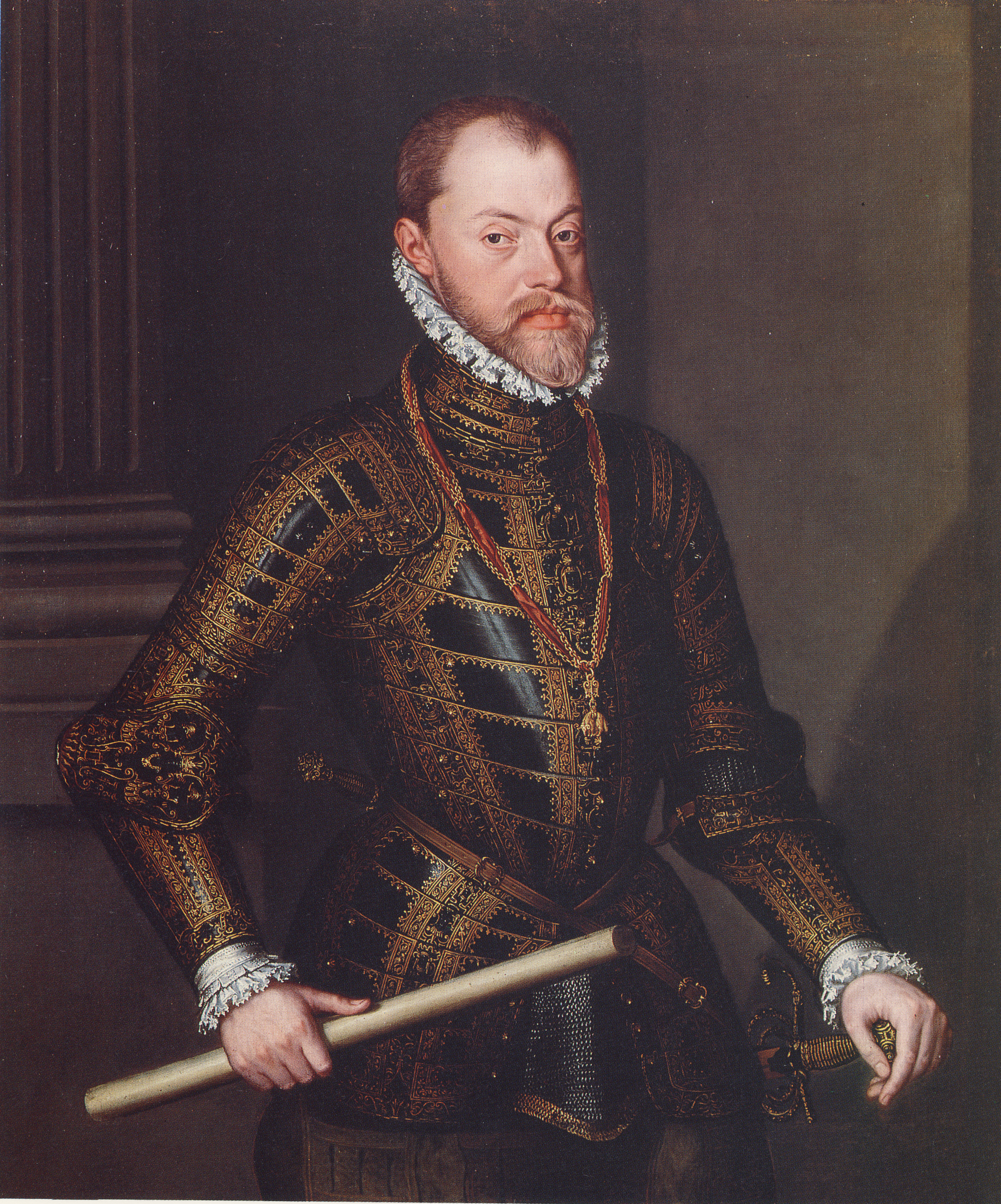
1. By Alonso Sánchez Coello, c. 1570

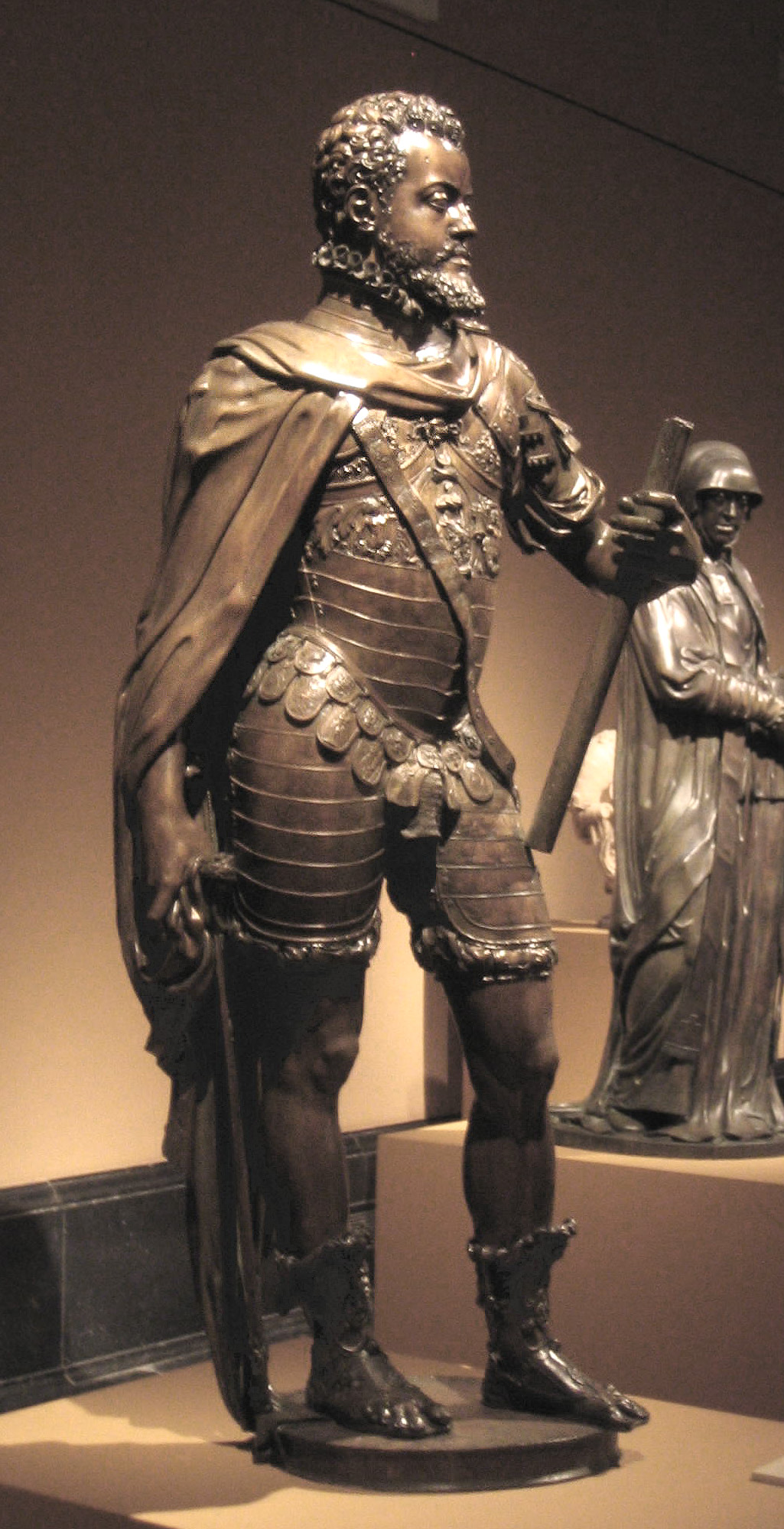
2. By Leone Leoni and Pompeo Leoni, 1551–1553

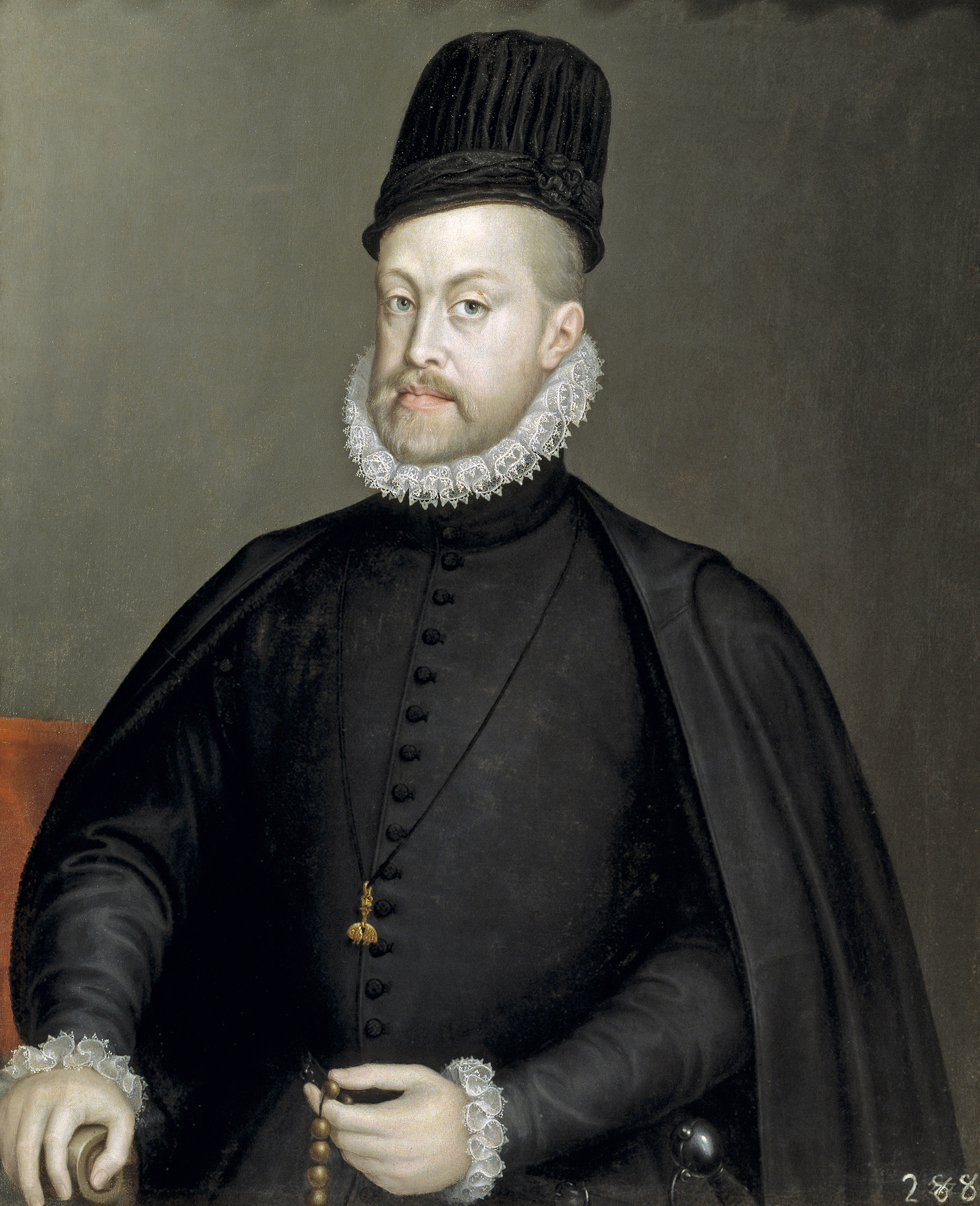
3. By Alonso Sánchez Coello or Sofonisba Anguissola, c. 1580

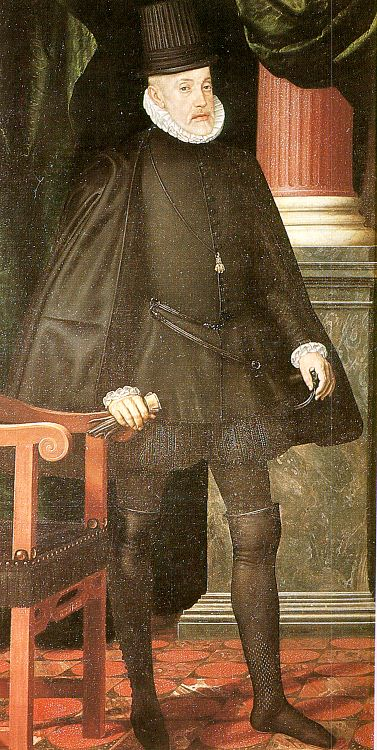
4. By Juan Pantoja de la Cruz, 1590–98
1. In this portrait, Philip is wearing the collar of the Order of the Golden Fleece and dressed in black armour similar to that made for him by Desiderius Colman of Augsburg, with gold damask work by Jorg Sigman, now in the Real Armería de Madrid. The Valencian Alonso Sánchez Coello (1531/2–1588) was a pupil of Antonis Mor (1517–1574) and a favourite painter of Philip.
2. This bronze is believed to have first been cast in 1551. Giorgio Vasari notes that the Milan-based Leone Leoni (1509–1590) also made heads of Philip and of Charles V. His son Pompeo Leoni (c. 1533–1608) produced a bust of Philip, c. 1556, painted silver, and later worked on the royal chapel at Philip's palace of El Escorial.
3. As he grew into middle age, the pious Philip favoured an austere style of dress for himself and his court. He is depicted here, as usual, wearing the collar of the Order of the Golden Fleece, and he holds a rosary. The painting has traditionally been identified as by Sánchez Coello because of the stylistic similarity with his portrait of Anne of Austria. More recently, however, it has been attributed to Sofonisba Anguissola, the artist from Cremona who served as lady-in-waiting to Philip's third wife, Elisabeth of Valois, and painted the royal family, often working closely with Sánchez Coello.
4. Sánchez Coello's successor as royal painter was his pupil Juan Pantoja de la Cruz (1553–1608), who painted this portrait of Philip in old age and went on to serve under Philip's son Philip III. In 1593, the Venetian ambassador Contarini reported that problems of debt, famine, and the succession "trouble the king's spirit and do much harm to his appearance". As described by the historian Henry Kamen, Pantoja de la Cruz's portrait "reflects perfectly the wastage of the years. Philip stands erect, dressed from tip to toe in black, with the Fleece as his only ornament. His face is ashen white, the same colour as his beard and hair. The lips sag. His eyes now … are weary, the lids half-closed". In the view of the art historian Jonathan Brown, Pantoja de la Cruz continued the style of Sánchez Coello but added the influence of Flemish painters, particularly of Rubens, resulting in a freer technique and greater psychological penetration.

=== Allegories ===
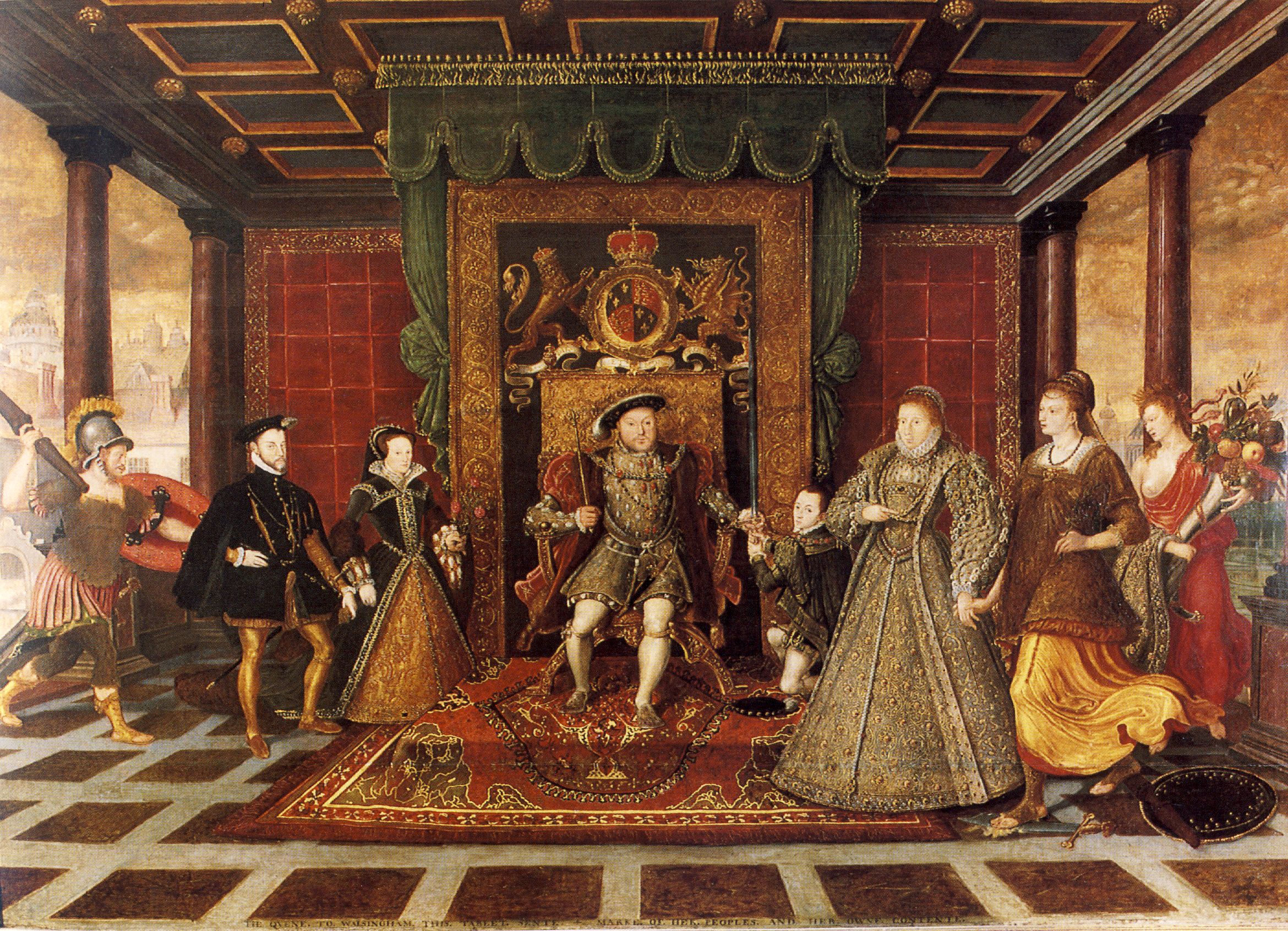
1. The Family of Henry VIII: An Allegory of the Tudor Succession, attributed to Lucas de Heere, c. 1572

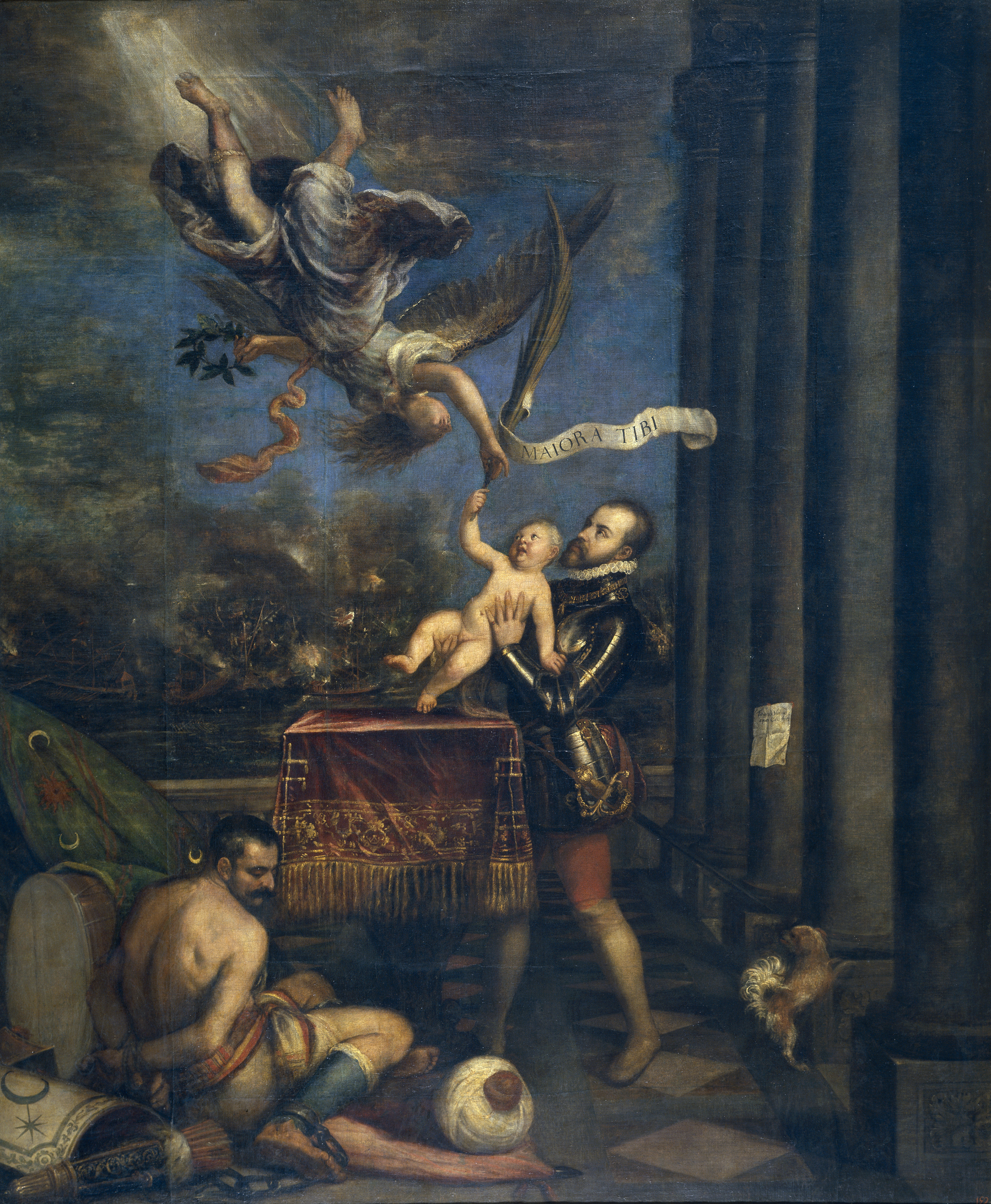
2. Philip II offering Fernando to Victory, by Titian, 1572–75

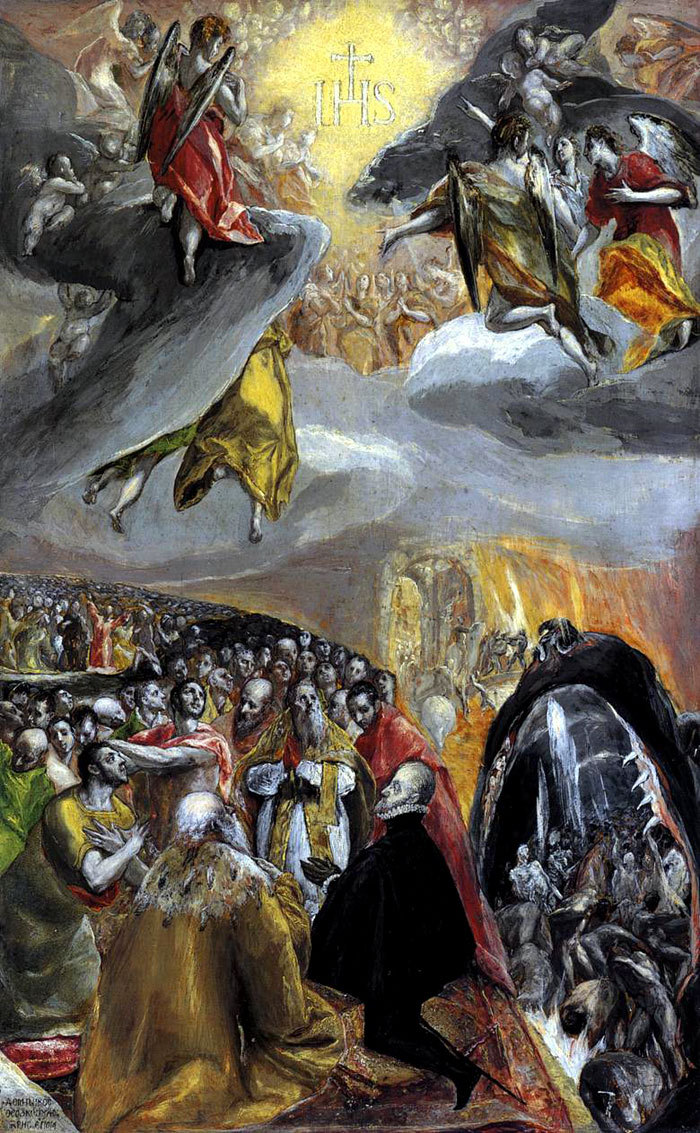
3. The Adoration of the Name of Jesus, by El Greco, 1577–80

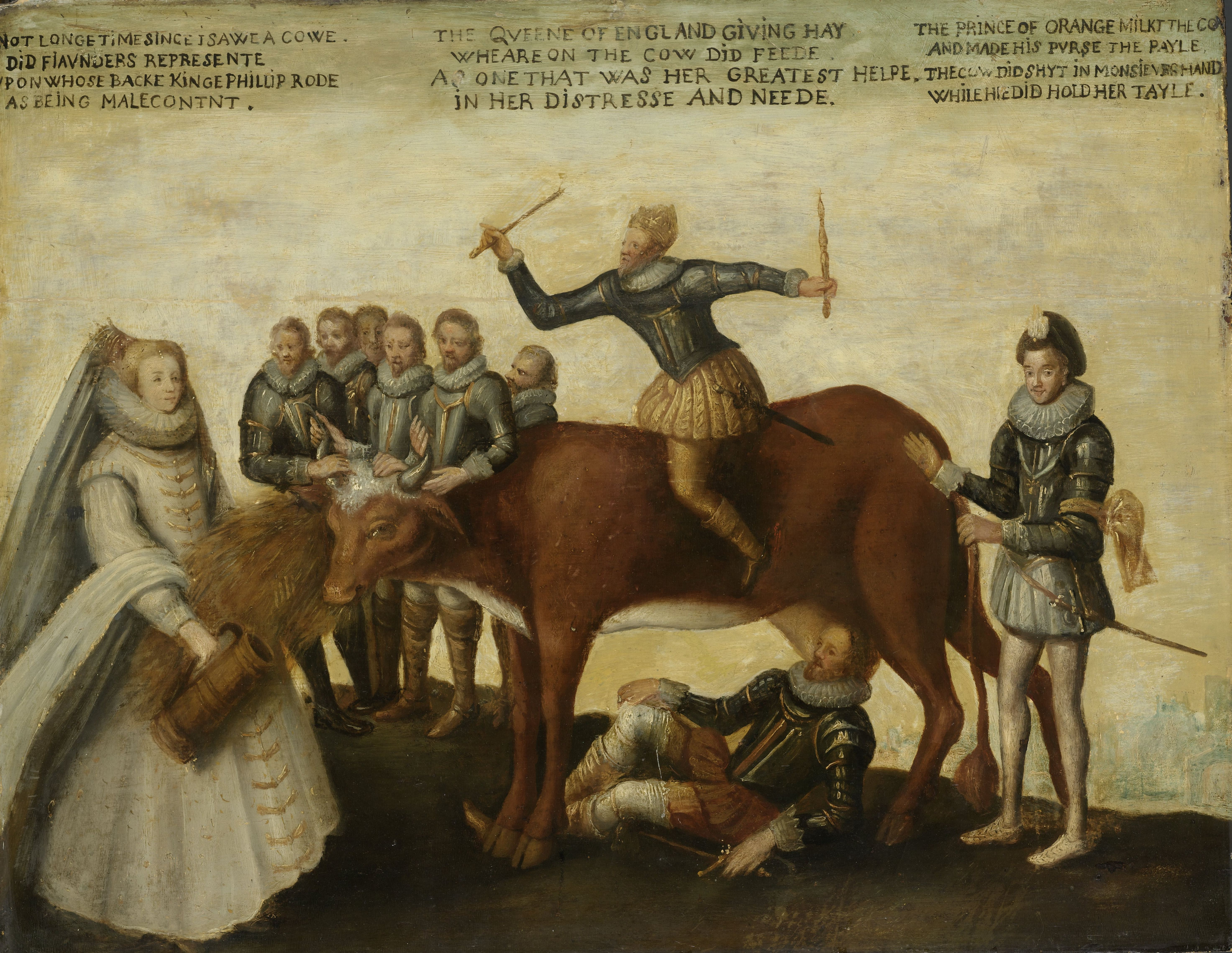
4. The Milch Cow, by an unknown artist, c. 1583
1. Mixing portraiture and allegory, this Elizabethan painting shows Henry VIII of England and his three children alongside figures from mythology. Henry died in 1547, but his daughter Mary is shown on the left of the painting next to her husband, Philip, whom she did not marry until 1554 when she was queen. Mars, god of war, looming behind the couple, symbolises their wars. Owing to a similarity of style and composition with Lucas de Heere's Solomon and the Queen of Sheba (1559) and other works, the art historian Roy Strong has attributed the work to de Heere (1534–1584). The art scholar and curator Karen Hearn, however, regards the attribution as speculative. Another source for the composition may be the group portrait The Family of Henry VIII (c. 1545). Prototypes for the figures of Philip and Mary are found in the portraits of Anthonis Mor.
2. Titian’s allegorical canvas, painted in the artist's nineties when he had not seen Philip for many years, celebrates both the victory of the Holy League over the Ottoman Turks at the Battle of Lepanto in 1571 and the birth shortly afterwards of a male heir to Philip, Don Fernando. The two events were seen as signs of God's favour. The battle is shown in the background, and a bound and defeated Turk slumps at Philip's feet. The king holds Fernando up to an angel, to receive a palm branch with the motto: "Majora tibi" (may you achieve greater deeds). A favourite artist of King Philip, Titian died in 1576, and Prince Fernando followed in 1578. Lepanto effectively ended Ottoman ambitions in the western Mediterranean.
3. El Greco may have painted The Adoration of the Name of Jesus in an attempt to win favour with King Philip, but he never achieved that aim. The subject is based on a text in Paul but may also be read as an allegory of the Holy League's victory over the Ottoman fleet at Lepanto in 1571. The black-clad figure in the foreground is identifiable as King Philip; the man in the yellow robe as a doge of Venice; the old man opposite him as the pope; and the figure on the left as Philip's brother John of Austria, the commander of the Christian fleet. In the heavens shines a monogram formed from IHS, the first three letters of the name Jesus in Greek—also In Hoc Signo and Jesus Hominum Salvator. A larger version of the painting, a votive altarpiece called The Dream of Philip II, is in the Escorial, Spain.
4. The Milch Cow was probably completed in the period following the visit to Queen Elizabeth's court in 1581–1582 of François, Duke of Anjou, brother of King Henry III of France, to discuss his marriage proposal and military support for the Anglo-Dutch alliance against the Spanish. Anjou's subsequent mission to the Netherlands met with disaster when the citizens of Antwerp massacred his army in early 1583. This satirical cartoon, one of several painted versions of the joke, depicts a cow which represents the Dutch provinces: King Philip is vainly trying to ride the cow; Queen Elizabeth is feeding it; William of Orange is milking it; and the cow is shitting on the hand of the Duke of Anjou, who is holding its tail. The caption reads:

Not longe time since I sawe a cowe
Did Flaunders represente
Upon whose backe King Philup rode
As being malecontnt.

The Queene of England giving hay
Wheareon the cow did feede,
As one that was her greatest helpe
In her distresse and neede.

The Prince of Orange milkt the cowe
And made his purse the payle.
The cow did shyt in Monsieur's hand
While he did hold her tayle.

== Video games ==
In Civilization II and Civilization VI, Philip II leads the Spanish.

== See also ==
- Cultural depictions of Charles V, Holy Roman Emperor
