= The Screaming Skull (short story) =

- Short story by Francis Marion Crawford
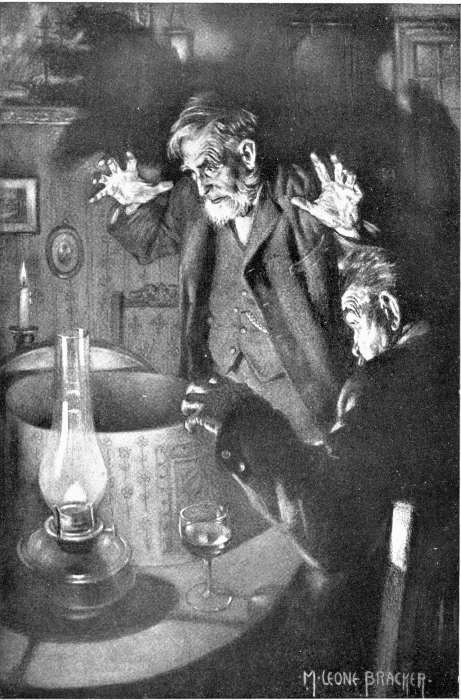
- "What?... It's gone, man, the skull is gone!!" An illustration from the frontispiece of Wandering Ghosts (1911), by M. Leone Bracker
- Country: United States
- Language: English
- Genre: Ghost story

Publication
- Published in: Collier's
- Media type: Print (magazine)
- Publication date: 11 July 1908

"The Screaming Skull" is a ghost story by American writer Francis Marion Crawford, first published in Collier's in 1908.

== Plot summary ==
The story takes the form of a monologue in which the narrator, retired sailor Captain Charles Braddock, tells his friend and former shipmate the history of a skull in his possession, beginning "I have often heard it scream." Braddock lived in the English village of Tredcombe with Dr. Luke Pratt and his wife, who had a troubled marriage. On one occasion, Braddock told Dr. Pratt the story of a woman who murdered three husbands by pouring melted lead into their ear while they slept. Several days afterward, Mrs. Pratt died in her sleep; Braddock later found a ladle with traces of melted lead in a cupboard of the Pratt's cottage, which he threw into the sea. Dr. Pratt himself was found dead on the beach with marks on his throat; next to his body was a hat box and a skull (with the lower jaw missing) which had inexplicably rolled uphill next to Dr. Pratt's head.

Braddock inherited Dr. Pratt's cottage. He tells his sceptical friend that he has previously attempted to dispose of the skull, but that if it is removed from the hat box in the cupboard of the "best bedroom", it screams. Braddock notes that the skull rattles when shaken, but that he has never looked inside for a piece of lead due to not wanting to know for certain if Dr. Pratt killed his wife. After Braddock's friend asks why he does not throw the "confounded bugbear" into a pond, a scream is heard.

Braddock recounts an incident where he threw the skull out of the bedroom window, only for it to inexplicably roll into the cottage's door. On another occasion, Braddock's gardener James Trehearn (who is also the sexton) found a jawbone in the house's garden when digging a bed for growing asparagus; unprompted, Trehearn speculated that the jawbone might fit the skull, leading Braddock to suspect that Trehearn may have examined Mrs. Pratt's body while digging her or her husband's grave and found her skull to be missing. Braddock later found that the jawbone was a perfect fit with the skull.

After Braddock's friend asks to see the skull, Braddock retrieves the hat box. To his shock, he finds the box is empty. A lump of lead falls onto the ground; Braddock is distressed at having it seemingly proven that Dr. Pratt murdered his wife using the method from Braddock's story. Braddock and his friend hear a knocking at the door; when they open it, the skull rolls into the cottage. When Braddock's friend picks up the skull to return it to the box, it seemingly bites his hand, drawing blood. Braddock and his friend return the box to the bedroom cupboard.

The story closes with an extract from the 23 November 1906 edition of the Penraddon News detailing the mysterious death of Braddock, who was found dead in his bed with his windpipe having been crushed by a bite from "a human assailant". The coroner concluding that Braddock was killed "by the hands or teeth of some person unknown", while the local surgeon suggests that the size of the jaws suggested the perpetrator was a woman.

== Publication ==
"The Screaming Skull" was first published in Collier's on 11 July 1908. In 1911, it was collected in Crawford's book Uncanny Tales (also titled Wandering Ghosts). It has since been anthologised many times, including in The Weird in 2011.

In a postscript to the story, Crawford notes that the "foundation" of the story is a legendary skull from Bettiscombe Manor in Dorsetshire.

== Reception ==
Writing for Reactor, Ruthanna Emrys described "The Screaming Skull" as "...an excellent monologue. Better than a monologue, really, because Crawford builds in negative space where you can almost hear Braddock's guest, almost see what he's doing."

Writing for The Guardian, Claire Armitstead stated "At first [the] ending seems a failure of narrative – the inability of a monologuist to report his own death. But the more you think about it, the clearer it becomes that Captain Braddock is not the innocent he purports to be."

John Moran wrote "Structurally it is a monologue although the narrator, Captain Charles Braddock, who eventually becomes mad and loses his mind at the story's end , seems at first to be talking with someone else; with consummate skill Crawford slowly transforms the captain into a monomaniac, progressively making the reader aware of it."

In his 1929 article "Some Remarks on Ghost Stories", ghost story writer M. R. James stated that "Marion Crawford and his horrid story of 'The Upper Berth', which (with 'The Screaming Skull' some distance behind) is the best in his collection of Uncanny Tales, and stands high among ghost stories in general."

== Adaptations ==
The Screaming Skull (1958)

In 1958, "The Screaming Skull" was loosely adapted as an independent film, The Screaming Skull, produced by John Kneubuhl and directed by actor Alex Nicol in his directorial debut. It starred John Hudson as Eric Whitlock and Peggy Webber as Jenni Whitlock. The film was distributed by American International Pictures as a double feature in different markets with either Earth vs. the Spider or Terror from the Year 5000. The film featured an opening disclaimer that a free burial would be provided to anybody who died of fright while watching the film, inspired by a gimmick that had been used by William Castle in his 1958 film Macabre.

On 23 April 1982, the CBC Radio series Nightfall broadcast an adaptation of "The Screaming Skull" by Guy Babineau, starring David Bulger as Captain Braddock.

== See also ==
- Screaming skull
