= Roald Dahl's Book of Ghost Stories =

Short story collection by Roald Dahl

thato
- First edition (US)
- Author: Roald Dahl (editor)
- Genre: Supernatural fiction
- Publisher: Jonathan Cape (UK); Farrar, Straus and Giroux (US)
- Publication date: Oct 1983
- Publication place: United Kingdom
- Media type: Paperback
- ISBN: 0-224-02149-4

Roald Dahl's Book of Ghost Stories (1983) is a collection of ghost stories chosen by Roald Dahl.

Dahl read 749 supernatural tales from an array of writers at the British Museum before choosing 14 that he considered the best. In the book Dahl writes; "Spookiness is, after all, the real purpose of the ghost story". He initially did this while working to develop an American television programme that would feature dramatisations of these stories. He wrote a pilot based on E. F. Benson's "The Hanging of Alfred Wadham", that was then filmed, but when producers saw the film they were concerned that it would offend American Catholics, due to the story being about the stipulations of confession. As a result, the show was cancelled, and years later Dahl decided to use his research to make a book.

== Contents ==
- "W.S." (1952) by L. P. Hartley
- "Harry" (1955) by Rosemary Timperley
- "The Corner Shop" (1926) by Lady Cynthia Asquith
- "In the Tube" (1922) by E. F. Benson
- "Christmas Meeting" (1952) by Rosemary Timperley
- "Elias and the Draug" (1902) by Jonas Lie
- "Playmates" (1927) by A. M. Burrage
- "Ringing the Changes" (1955) by Robert Aickman
- "The Telephone" (1955) by Mary Treadgold
- "The Ghost of a Hand" (1863) by Sheridan Le Fanu
- "The Sweeper" (1931) by A. M. Burrage
- "Afterward" (1910) by Edith Wharton
- "On the Brighton Road" (1912) by Richard Barham Middleton
- "The Upper Berth" (1885) by Francis Marion Crawford
