= Vincent Jerome (actor) =

English actor (born 1982)

- Born: Vincent Mark J. Jerome; 9 June 1982 (age 44); Brent, London, England
- Education: London Metropolitan University (BA)
- Occupation: Actor
- Television: Waterloo Road; Cooper & Fry

Vincent Mark J. Jerome (born 9 June 1982) is an British actor. After appearing in an array of films and short films, he portrayed Lindon King in the BBC school drama series Waterloo Road between 2023 and 2024. Since 2025, he has appeared in the Channel 5 drama series Cooper & Fry as DCI David Branagh.

== Life and career ==
Vincent Mark J. Jerome was born on 9 June 1982 in Brent, London. He studied at the London Metropolitan University, graduating with a BA Hons in Performing Arts. He made his screen debut in 2003, appearing as a barman in the television film Second Generation. He subsequently went on to appear in an array of films, short films and television shows including Letter to Rothko and The Third Testament: The Antichrist and the Harlot (2009), Kickoff and Bashment (2011), Gangsters, Guns & Zombies (2012), Need to Know and Brothers with No Game (2013), Gone Wrong, Mohammed and The Devil's in the Detail (2014). In 2015, he appeared in an episode of Playhouse Presents. He also appeared in four episodes of The Few in 2016, and in the film Transformers: The Last Knight in 2017.

In 2018, he appeared in the short films All The Way and The Easy Lift, and in 2019 he appeared in Faces, Born Again Builders, The Cloaking, Living in Crime Alley and Fool's Errand. In 2020, he appeared in an episode of Sins of Solitude, as well as the film Wonder Woman 1984 and a short film titled Tainted. In 2021, he appeared in the short films Feast and Outward. In 2022, he appeared a film titled The Pay Day and portrayed Sid in an episode of The Peripheral. He has appeared in array of stage productions including Freddie / McCarron at the Vault Festival in 2019 in The Talented Mr. Ripley, as well as D.S. Glenn Branson in Dead Simple at The Mill at Sonning.

In January 2023, Jerome joined the cast of the BBC school drama series Waterloo Road following its reboot. He appeared as deputy headteacher Lindon King between the eleventh series and thirteenth series. In 2025, he joined the cast of the Channel 5 drama Cooper & Fry as DCI David Branagh.

== Filmography ==
Year	Title	Role	Notes
2003	Second Generation	Barman	Television film
2009	Letter to Rothko	Art Student	Short film
2009	The Third Testament: The Antichrist and the Harlot	Warren Bishop	Film role
2011	Kickoff	Repo Man	Film role
2011	Bashment	Police Officer	Film role
2012	Gangsters, Guns & Zombies	Q	Film role
2013	Need to Know	R&D	6 episodes
2013	Brothers with No Game	Keith	Episode: "Finale"
2014	Gone Wrong	Alfie	Short film
2014	Mohammed	Hulk (voice)	Short film
2014	The Devil’s in the Detail	Jonas	Short film
2015	Playhouse Presents	Security	Episode: "Three Kinds of Stupid"
2016	The Few	Christian Davis	4 episodes
2017	Transformers: The Last Knight	TRF Operator	Film role
2018	All The Way	Theo	Short film
2018	The Easy Lift	Wallace	Short film
2019	Faces	Board Member	Short film
2019	Born Again Builders	Big Tel	Short film
2019	The Cloaking	Les	Film role
2019	Living in Crime Alley	Father	Short film
2019	Fool's Errand	Michael	Short film
2020	Sins of Solitude	Jay	Episode: "Pride"
2020	Wonder Woman 1984	US Army Tech	Film role
2020	Tainted	Peter	Short film
2021	Feast	Delivery Man	Short film
2021	Outward	Darius	Short film
2022	The Pay Day	Big Al	Film role
2022	The Peripheral	Sid	Episode: "The Creation of a Thousand Forests"
2023	Smoking in Public	—N/a	Short film
2023–2024	Waterloo Road	Lindon King	Main role
2025	Cooper & Fry	DCI David Branagh	Recurring role
TBA	Clipped Wings	D.I Wes Nolan	Short film

== Stage ==
Year	Title	Role	Venue	Ref.
2006	Ophelia’s Song	Polonius/Player	Vocal Motions Elastic Theatre	
2006	The Love of the Nightingale	Tereus	3 Y R Productions	
2008	'’The Magdalene Mysteries'’	Simon Peter	Elastic Theatre	
2009	A Team the Musical	B A Baracus	Scratch/Gareth Kane	
2009	Faggamuffin	Maxie / Earl	Team Angelica	
2009	How to Cook a Country	Prison Guard / Customs Officer	Accelerator Theatre/Riverside Studios	
2009	Laters	Shane	Team Angelica	
2010	Decade	Suliman	Theatre 503	
2010	Election Drama: Bang Up by Anders Lustgarten	Mark	Supporting Wall	
2010	Mother Knows Best	Dev	Theatre 503	
2010	Subs	James	Good Night Out Presents	
2011	Kidsco/Urban Academy	Various	National Theatre Studio	
2011	The Knitting Circle	Colin Shine/Johnathan	Vital Xposure	
2017	Dead Simple	Glenn Branson	The Mill at Sonning	
2019	The Talented Mr. Ripley	Freddie / McCarron	The Vault Festival	
