= Cooper & Fry =

British television series

- Genre: Crime drama; Detective fiction; Murder mystery
- Created by: Ben Court; Caroline Ip
- Based on: Cooper and Fry by Stephen Booth
- Written by: Ben Court; Caroline Ip; Kit Lambert; Jeff Povey
- Directed by: Ryan Tohill; Jesse Quinones
- Starring: Mandip Gill; Robert James-Collier
- Music by: Damian Molony
- Country of origin: United Kingdom
- Original language: English
- No. of series: 1
- No. of episodes: 4

Production
- Executive producers: Rachel Gesua; Mike Benson; Stephen Booth
- Producers: Simon James Doyle; Ian Hunt-Duffy
- Running time: 91 minutes
- Production company: Clapperboard

Original release
- Network: Channel 5
- Release: 18 November 2025 – present

Cooper & Fry is a British crime television series adapted from the Cooper and Fry novels written by Stephen Booth, with Robert James-Collier and Mandip Gill in the title roles. The series began airing on Channel 5 from 18 November 2025. It has been renewed for a second series.

== Premise ==
An English detective in the Peak District, Ben Cooper, must work on a string of mysterious deaths with a guarded newcomer, Diane Fry.

== Cast ==
- Robert James-Collier as DC Ben Cooper
- Mandip Gill as DC Diane Fry
- Lorcan Cranitch as DI Paul Hitchens
- Barry O'Connor as DS Todd Eland
- Niamh McCann as Tracy Garnett
- Charlotte Bradley as Isobel Cooper
- Clara Simpson as Dr Juliana Taylor

=== Guest ===
- Vincent Jerome as DCI David Branagh (episodes 3–4)
- Mika Simmons as Sarah Runshaw (episode 3)

== Production ==
The four-part first series was announced in July 2025 by Channel 5 and produced by Clapperboard Studios, in association with Failsafe Films, and distributed by STUDIO TF1. The series is co-created by Ben Court and Caroline Ip who also serve as writers on the series, with Kit Lambert and Jeff Povey.

The cast is led by Mandip Gill as Diane Fry and Robert James-Collier as Ben Cooper. First-look images from filming were released on 1 November 2025.

The programme is set in the fictional town of Edendale in Derbyshire's Peak District, but filmed in Ireland: Dublin; County Wicklow: Bray, Glendalough, Newtown Mount Kennedy, Glendarragh, Lough Dan, Roundwood, and Cloghleagh Forest; and County Kildare: Ballymore Eustace and Kilteel.

In July 2026 it was announced that a second series would be made. Filming on the eight one-hour episode second series took place in the summer of 2026, with episodes based on The Devil’s Edge (2011, eleventh novel in the series), Fall Down Dead (2018, eighteenth novel in the series), One Last Breath (2004, fifth novel in the series) and The Murder Road (2015, fifteenth novel in the series).

== Episodes ==
=== Series 1 ===
The first four episodes aired on Channel 5, for two hours and five minutes between 8pm and 10:05pm on Tuesday nights, with adverts, starting 18 November 2025, each based on a novel from Stephen Booth's series of the same name.

No.	Episode	Directed by	Written by	Original release date	UK viewers (millions)
1	1	Ryan Tohill	Kit Lambert	18 November 2025	N/A
Adapted from Dying to Sin (the 2007 eighth novel in the series)
2	2	Ryan Tohill	Ben Court and Caroline Ip	25 November 2025	N/A
Adapted from Black Dog (the 2000 first novel in the series)
3	3	Jesse Quinones	Ben Court and Caroline Ip	2 December 2025	N/A
Adapted from Blind to the Bones (the 2003 fourth novel in the series)
4	4	Jesse Quinones	Jeff Povey	9 December 2025	N/A
Adapted from Dancing with the Virgins (the 2001 second novel in the series)

== Broadcast ==
Cooper and Fry started broadcasting on Channel 5 on 18 November 2025. It started showing in the Netherlands on BBC NL on 25 May 2026. It started showing in Belgium on VRT CANVAS on 4 September 2026.

== Reception ==
Gerard Gilbert, in The i Paper, called Cooper and Fry "TV's best new detective duo in years" and wrote: "Cooper and Fry ... is immediately seductive thanks to its two brilliant leads". Abby Allen of Hello! wrote: "There's nothing like a twisty new detective drama to invest in, and this show promises to have you hooked from start to finish".

Ben Dowell of The Times gave the first episode two out of five stars, writing "Here, our main pair are far too one-note".
