= Bettiscombe =

Village and civil parish in Dorset, England

Coordinates: 50.7962°N 2.8549°W

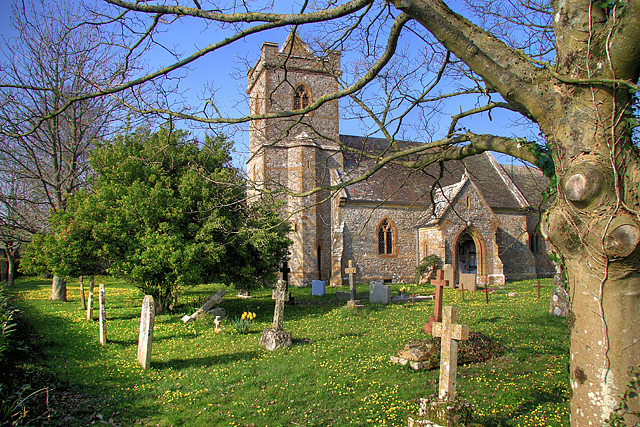
- Parish church of St Stephen

- Location within Dorset
- Population: 50
- OS grid reference: ST395005
- Unitary authority: Dorset
- Ceremonial county: Dorset
- Region: South West
- Country: England
- Sovereign state: United Kingdom
- Post town: Bridport
- Postcode district: DT6
- Police: Dorset
- Fire: Dorset and Wiltshire
- Ambulance: South Western
- UK Parliament: West Dorset

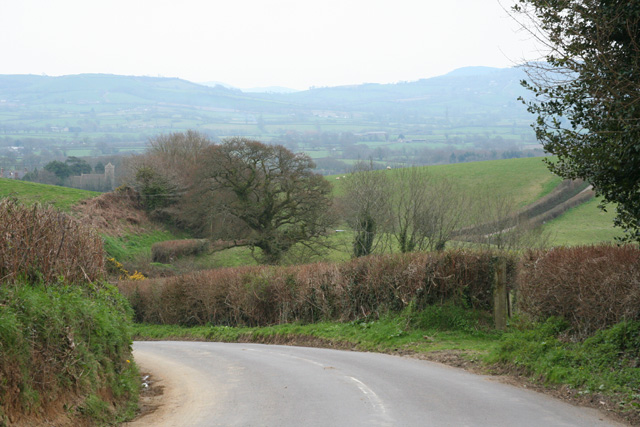
Bettiscombe viewed from the north (church visible in middle distance, on left)

Bettiscombe is a small village and civil parish in west Dorset, England, situated in the Marshwood Vale four miles (6.4 km) west of Beaminster. Dorset County Council's 2013 mid-year estimate of the population of the civil parish is 50.

== History ==
The parish church, dedicated to St Stephen, has two windows in the chancel and possibly one in the west tower dating from about 1400, although the rest of the structure was rebuilt by John Hicks in 1862.

== Skull legend ==
Bettiscombe Manor, a manor house in the village, is known as "The House of the screaming skull" due to a legend dating from the 19th century. The Bettiscome Manor skulls inspired the 1908 short story "The Screaming Skull" by Francis Marion Crawford. Other ghost stories are also associated with the manor. The legend maintains that the skull is that of a Jamaican slave belonging to John Frederick Pinney.

Azariah Pinney's descendants disposed of their Nevis estates and returned to the family home of Bettiscombe Manor in 1830, accompanied by one of the family's black slaves. While in his master's service, the servant was taken seriously ill with suspected tuberculosis. As he lay dying, the servant swore that he would never rest unless his body was returned to his homeland of Nevis, but when he died, John Frederick Pinney refused to pay for such an expensive burial and instead had the body interred in the grounds of St. Stephen's Church cemetery. After the burial, ill fortune plagued the village for many months and screams and crying were heard coming from the cemetery. Other disturbances were reported from the manor house, such as windows rattling and doors slamming of their own accord. The villagers went to the manor to seek advice. The body of the servant was exhumed and the body taken to the manor house. In the process of time the skeleton has long since vanished, except for the skull.

In 1963 a professor of human and comparative anatomy at the Royal College of Surgeons stated that the skull was not that of a black man but that of a European female aged between twenty-five and thirty.

== See also ==
- Burton Agnes Hall
- Chilton Cantelo
- Screaming skull
