= Khaled: A Tale of Arabia =

1891 novel by Francis Marion Crawford

Khaled; a Tale of Arabia
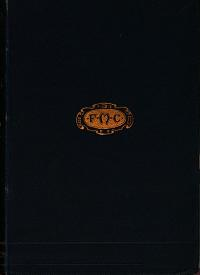
- Cover of first edition
- Author: F. Marion Crawford
- Language: English
- Genre: Fantasy novel
- Publisher: Macmillan and Co.
- Publication date: 1891
- Publication place: United Kingdom
- English publication date: 1891
- Media type: Print (Hardcover)
- Pages: 258 p.

Khaled: A Tale of Arabia is a fantasy novel by F. Marion Crawford. It was first published in hardcover by Macmillan and Co. in 1891; its first paperback edition was issued by Ballantine Books as the thirty-ninth volume of the Ballantine Adult Fantasy series in December, 1971. The Ballantine edition includes an introduction by Lin Carter.

The novel is an oriental romance written in the style of the Arabian Nights.

== Plot summary ==
Khaled has no soul – but he is offered one chance: if his wife comes to love him, despite his lack of a soul, he will become fully human.
