= Sant'Agnello =

- Comune
- Comune di Sant'Agnello
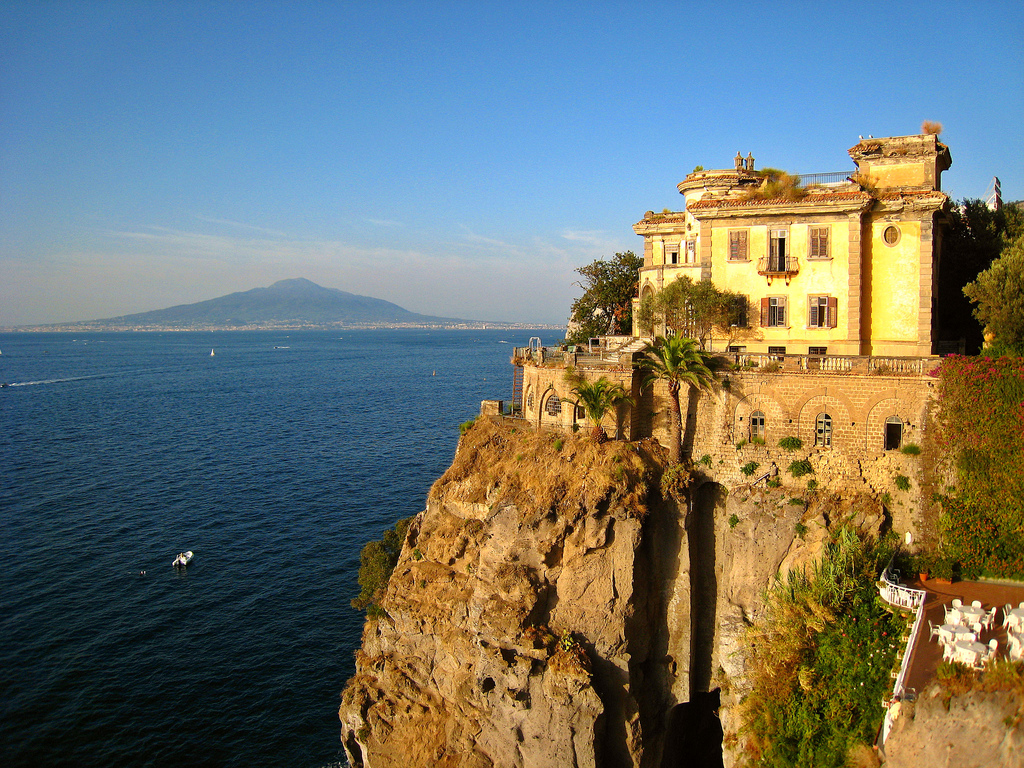

- Coat of arms

- Location within Campania Location within Italy
- Coordinates: 40°38′N 14°24′E
- Country: Italy
- Region: Campania
- Metropolitan city: Naples (NA)

Government
  - Mayor: Piergiorgio Sagristani

Area
  - Total: 4.1 km^{2} (1.6 sq mi)

Population (31 December 2010)
  - Total: 9,079
  - Density: 2,200/km^{2} (5,700/sq mi)
- Demonym: Santanellesi
- Time zone: UTC+1 (CET)
  - Summer (DST): UTC+2 (CEST)
- Postal code: 80065
- Dialing code: 081

Sant'Agnello is a comune (municipality) in the Metropolitan City of Naples in the Italian region Campania, located about 25 km southeast of Naples.

Sant'Agnello borders the following municipalities: Piano di Sorrento, Sorrento. It is served by the Circumvesuviana, a narrow gauge railway that connects to the city of Naples.

== Notable people ==
- Francis Marion Crawford (1854–1909) an American novelist, lived in Sant'Agnello from 1887 until his death in a small palace known as Villa Crawford.

== See also ==
- Sorrentine Peninsula
- Amalfi Coast
