= Son of India (1931 film) =

1931 film

- Theatrical poster
- Directed by: Jacques Feyder
- Screenplay by: Ernest Vajda; John Meehan; Claudine West
- Based on: Mr. Isaacs by Francis Marion Crawford
- Starring: Ramón Novarro; Madge Evans
- Cinematography: Harold Rosson
- Edited by: Conrad A. Nervig
- Distributed by: Metro-Goldwyn-Mayer
- Release date: August 1, 1931
- Running time: 73 minutes
- Country: United States
- Language: English

Son of India is a 1931 American pre-Code romance film directed by Jacques Feyder and starring Ramón Novarro and Madge Evans. The film is based on the 1882 novel Mr. Isaacs written by Francis Marion Crawford.

== Plot ==
Karim is the son of rajah and jewel merchant Hamid, traveling with him through India. On the twentieth day of their journey, after Karim hears his father speak about the importance of gratitude, they are attacked by bandits. The group of travelers is massacred, but Rao Rama, a holy man, hides Karim in a shallow grave. He survives the tragedy, and is left with his father's most valuable diamond.

Karim next journeys to Bombay, where he attempts to sell the diamond in a jewelry store. Feeling that they aren't offering him enough money, he leaves. The corrupt store owners claim that Karim is a thief. He is arrested, and unable to prove he is the true owner of his father's diamond, faces a long prison sentence. William Darsey, an American witness, saves him by revealing the truth and Karim is released.

Some time later, Karim becomes one of the wealthiest men of Bombay, attending many high society social functions. At a polo match, he meets Janice Darsey, an attractive young American woman accompanied by her aunt and Dr. Wallace. Feeling attracted to each other, they are soon in love. This is much to Mrs. Darsey's dislike, who doesn't approve of her niece dating an Indian man. She attempts to sabotage their relationship by announcing that the Darseys will leave for Calcutta.

Janice, however, does not want to leave Karim and runs away from her aunt to secretly accompany Karim on a tiger hunt. When her aunt finds out, she is infuriated and immediately calls for William, who happens to be Janice's brother. During the hunt, Karim notices his father's killer. When confronted, the murderer shoots at Karim. Janice starts to hide and stumbles upon a poisonous plant. Karim brings her to safety and removes the poison, after which they become engaged. Back at home, William and Mrs. Darsey try to stop the marriage by telling them lies, but Karim and Janice come to the conclusion that their love for each other is stronger.

== Cast ==
- Ramón Novarro as Karim
- Madge Evans as Janice Darsey
- Conrad Nagel as William Darsey
- Marjorie Rambeau as Mrs. Darsey
- C. Aubrey Smith as Dr. Wallace
- Mitchell Lewis as Hamid
- John Miljan as Juggat
- Nigel De Brulier as Rao Rama
- Katherine DeMille as Amah (uncredited)
- Ann Dvorak as Dancer (uncredited)

== Production ==
Son of India reunited Ramón Novarro with Jacques Feyder, whom he previously had worked with before on Daybreak (1931). It was Feyder's last film before returning to Europe. Novarro's leading lady was Madge Evans. Evans was at the beginning of her MGM career and she was later assigned as Novarro's love interest several times again.
