= A Roman Singer =

1884 novel by Francis Marion Crawford

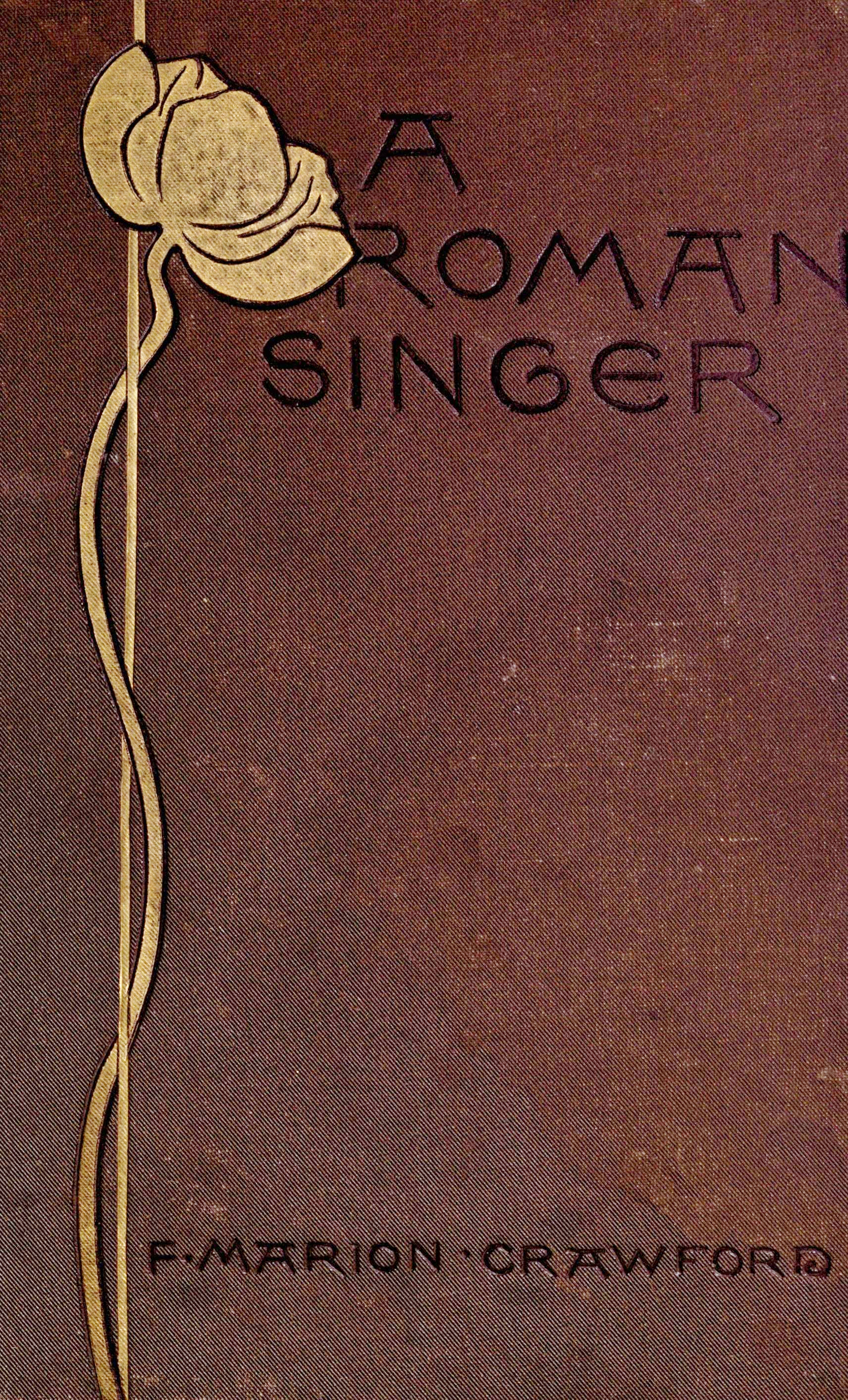
- First edition cover
- Author: F. Marion Crawford
- Language: English
- Publication date: 1884
- Publication place: United Kingdom, United States
- English publication date: 1884
- Media type: Print (Hardcover)

A Roman Singer is an 1884 novel by F. Marion Crawford. First serialized in The Atlantic from July 1883 to June 1884, it was published in book form in 1884. It was among the best selling books in the United States in 1884.

The novel is set in Rome and in the village of Filettino high in the Apennines, a region Crawford knew well. Crawford was born in Italy and spent many years there, including, most immediately before writing this novel, studying Sanskrit at the University of Rome from 1876 to 1878. He wrote A Roman Singer in early 1883, and moved back to Italy that same year. The story revolves around the love of an Italian tenor for the daughter of a Prussian officer.
