= Terror from the Year 5000 =

1958 science fiction film

- Theatrical release poster designed by Albert Kallis, with artwork by Reynold Brown
- Directed by: Robert J. Gurney Jr.
- Written by: Robert J. Gurney Jr. based on a story by Henry Slesar
- Produced by: Robert J. Gurney Jr. Samuel Z. Arkoff; James H. Nicholson; Gene Searchinger
- Starring: Ward Costello; Joyce Holden; John Stratton; Salome Jens; Fred Herrick
- Cinematography: Arthur Florman
- Edited by: Dede Allen
- Music by: Richard DuPage
- Release date: August 1958
- Running time: 66 minutes
- Country: United States
- Language: English

Terror from the Year 5000 (retitled Cage of Doom in the UK) is a 1958 independently made American black-and-white science fiction film, produced by Robert J. Gurney Jr, Samuel Z. Arkoff, James H. Nicholson, and Gene Searchinger. Directed by Robert J. Gurney Jr, it stars Ward Costello, Joyce Holden, John Stratton, Salome Jens, and Fred Herrick. The screenplay is based (uncredited) on the short story "Bottle Baby" by print/TV/film writer Henry Slesar that was published in the science fiction magazine Fantastic (April 1957). American International Pictures released the film in August 1958 in a double feature with The Screaming Skull. (In some areas, it was apparently double billed with Earth vs. The Spider or The Brain Eaters.)

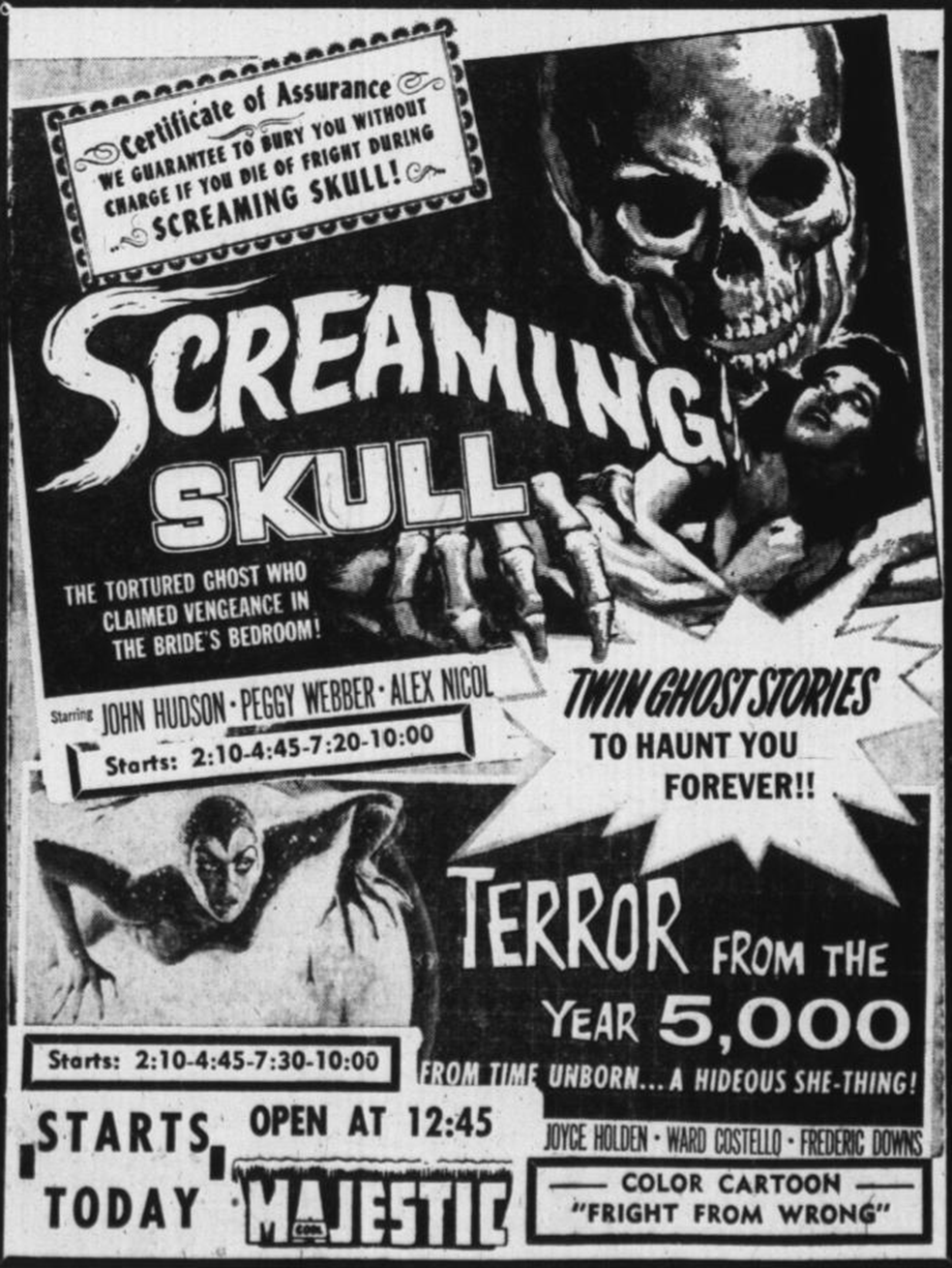
Advertisement from 1958 for Terror from the Year 5000 and co-feature The Screaming Skull.

== Plot ==
Working in the privacy of his Florida island estate, nuclear physicist Professor Howard Erling and his assistant Victor construct a machine that transports a small statue from the future. Concerned over the vast amounts of energy needed to conduct the experiments and realizing their work needs verification from another professional, Howard calls a halt to the research. The statue is sent to noted archeologist Bob Hedges, who determines it comes from the year 5200 AD.

Bob learns that the statue is radioactive and attempts to contact Howard to question him about it, eventually flying to Florida to speak with him. Bob is followed from the airport and confronts his pursuer after a chase, to discover it is Claire Erling, Howard's daughter and Victor's fiancée. Claire admits to sending the statue, wanting to accelerate the verification of her father's work. She and Bob pilot a motor boat out to the island estate and when the motor dies Claire reveals this is caused by the power drain from her father's lab.

Howard receives Bob graciously, but Victor is resentful, suspecting that the archeologist intends to refute their work. That night, Bob hears Victor enter the guest room and remove two metal suitcases which he takes outside and throws into a pond. The next morning, Bob goes swimming with Claire in the pond and locates one suitcase, finding the body of a small animal inside. Later, Howard shows Bob the lab and demonstrates how he and Victor have succeeded in "trading objects with the future".

Howard sends a small bottle through the machine and receives a similar object back. Bob suggests sending something unusual and submits his fraternity key. The men are startled when a coin from the future materializes with the words "save us" in Greek engraved upon it. That night, Victor sneaks down to the lab and continues his experiment by increasing the power level, which results in a human form materializing. Victor manages to return the figure to the future, although he suffers a serious gash on his arm. When Bob reports Victor's unusual behavior to Howard the next morning, he demands evidence and Bob goes to the pond to retrieve the suitcases. Victor tries to stop him and reveals his arm which is now suffering from radiation burns.

Despite Victor's objections, he is taken to the hospital where a doctor examines him. Victor flees from the hospital though and goes to a bar, eventually returning to the island drunk. He breaks into the lab and resumes working with the machine at high power levels. Meanwhile, Howard, Bob and Claire find the bar that Victor was at and when the bar's television reception goes out, Howard realizes Victor has turned on the time machine. As they race back to the island, Victor succeeds in bringing a human form from the future, who knocks him out. Howard finds Victor dazed and calls a nurse to come and tend to him, while the time traveller explores the island, killing Angelo. Bob succeeds in retrieving one of the metal suitcases from the pond, which contains the body of a four-eyed cat.

Returning to the house, Howard and Bob stumble upon Angelo's body. Victor tells them about the time traveller and Howard shows him the mutated cat. The nurse arrives on the island and is murdered by the time traveller, who creates a replica of her face using a strange device and puts on her clothes. After gaining entrance to the house, the traveller sits with Victor and hypnotizes him, revealing that her purpose is to bring him to the future, where his healthy genes will be used to breed a new race of radiation-immune humans.

Attracted by noises in the lab, Claire is shocked to find Victor and the traveller revving up the time machine. In an attempt to break the hypnotic spell on Victor, Claire attacks the traveller and pulls the mask from her face, revealing her radiation-scarred features. Having discovered the faceless body of the real nurse, Howard and Bob return to the lab. They find Victor defending Claire, until he and the traveller tumble against the machine, which electrocutes and kills them both. Afterward, Bob and Claire wonder if one of them should go to the future to help. Howard convinces them that instead they should focus on changing the present so that such a future never happens.

== Cast ==
- Ward Costello as Dr. Robert Hedges
- Joyce Holden as Claire Erling
- Frederic Downs as Prof. Howard Erling
- John Stratton as Victor
- Salome Jens as Future Woman / Nurse
- Fred Herrick as Angelo
- Beatrice Furdeaux as Miss Blake
- Bruce Lum as Senior Lab Technician
- Jack Diamond as First Lab Technician
- Fred Taylor as Second Lab Technician
- Bill Downs as Dr. Blair
- William Cost as Joe the Bartender

== Production ==
Some facts on the production of Terror from the Year 5000 include:

- Outdoor shots were filmed in and around Dade County, Florida.
- The working title of the film was The Girl from 5000 A.D.
- This is the first feature film credit for theater/film/TV actress Salome Jens.
- The film is one of the earliest editing credits for Dede Allen, who went on to a career editing such feature films as The Hustler, Bonnie and Clyde, Dog Day Afternoon, and Reds.
- Beatrice Furdeaux, who had a small supporting role, was married to producer-director Robert J. Gurney Jr. She is also credited (as Beatrice Gurney) as production supervisor and co-production designer on the film.

== Reception ==
Critic Kevin Lyons wrote that the film's "few good ideas don't go very far," that it features "a far from interesting love triangle and a mystery that never really resolves itself satisfactorily", that it is "weary and slightly browbeaten", but also that director "Gurney is capable of isolated moments of real atmosphere and suspense." Critic Mark Hasan described the film as "the perfect synthesis of sci-fi clichés and fifties naïveté, done with deadpan seriousness" and that "Gurney's budget and his own screenwriting doom the project into a laughable Z-movie."

The film was featured on Mystery Science Theater 3000 in 1997 during its eighth season.
