= Black Dog (novel) =

Novel by Stephen Booth

- First edition (UK)
- Author: Stephen Booth
- Language: English
- Series: Cooper and Fry
- Genre: Crime novel
- Publisher: Harper Collins (UK)
- Publication place: United Kingdom
- Awards: 2001 Barry Award
- ISBN: 978-0006514329
- Followed by: Dancing with the Virgins

Black Dog is the debut novel by author Stephen Booth in the Cooper and Fry series of novels, set in the Peak District. Black Dog won the 2001 Barry Award for the Best British Crime Novel.

== Synopsis ==
A teenager goes missing and her body is found by a retired miner, who is not completely forthcoming with the police. DC Ben Cooper, a local, must work with DC Diane Fry, who is new to the area, to solve the crime.
