= Peggy Webber =

American actress (1925–2026)

- Webber in Dragnet, 1969
- Born: Margaret Webber; September 15, 1925; Laredo, Texas, U.S.
- Died: August 15, 2026 (aged 100); Napa, California, U.S.
- Occupation: Actress
- Years active: 1937–2005
- Spouse(s): Robert Marshall Sinskey (m. 1951; div. 1967) Sean McClory (m. 1983; died 2003)
- Children: 3

Margaret Webber (September 15, 1925 – August 15, 2026) was an American actress and writer who worked in film, stage, television, and radio.

Webber was known for her supporting role as Lady Macduff in Orson Welles's 1948 adaption of Macbeth, as Alice Dennerly in Alfred Hitchcock's 1956 film The Wrong Man and for her leading role as Jenni Whitlock in the 1958 horror film The Screaming Skull. On television, she was notable for her frequent appearances on M Squad (1957–1960) and Dragnet (1967–1970).

== Early years ==
The daughter of a wildcat oil driller, Margaret Webber was born in Laredo, Texas, on September 15, 1925. Before she was three years old, she was entertaining audiences at intermission times in theaters. In 1942, she graduated from Tucson High School, where she was active in dramatics.

== Career ==
Following her father's death and her family's loss of wealth, Webber and her mother moved to Hollywood to start her acting career. Webber debuted on radio at age 12 on WOAI (AM) in San Antonio, Texas. Her vocal talents for radio were highlighted in Time magazine's August 5, 1946, issue. The Radio: Vocal Varieties article noted, "In three years, her latex voice has supplied radio with 150 different characters on some 2,500 broadcasts."

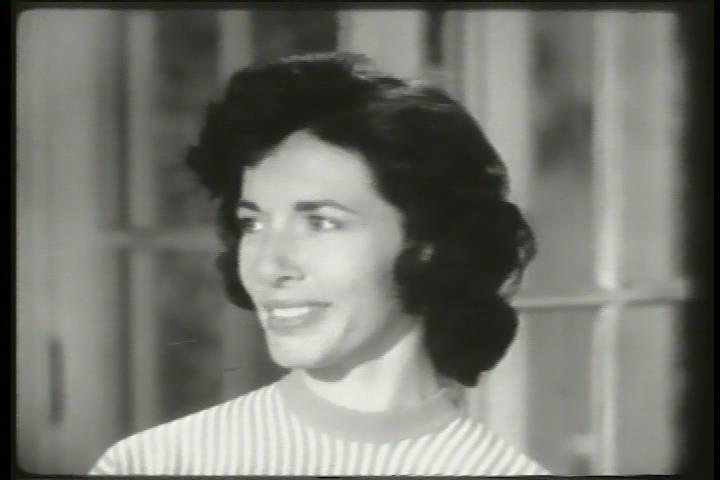
Webber in the trailer for The Screaming Skull (1958)

Programs on which she was heard included The Dreft Star Playhouse, Dragnet, The Woman in My House, Pete Kelly's Blues, Dr. Paul, The Damon Runyon Theater, and The Man Called X.

Webber's screen debut came in the 1946 film Her Adventurous Night. In 1948, she played Lady Macduff in Orson Welles's adaptation of Macbeth. Her other notable roles include Mrs. Alice Rice in the 1952 film Submarine Command and Miss Dennerly in The Wrong Man, directed by Alfred Hitchcock.

Webber appeared on a number of television programs including Dragnet, and the follow-up series, Dragnet 1967. She portrayed Elise Sandor in Kings Row on ABC from 1955 to 1956. She played the part of Ella McIntyre in the 1956 Quicksand episode of "Cheyenne". She also played abused sister Flora Stancil in the 1957 Gunsmoke episode "Cheap Labor". She also had roles in The Waltons, Climax!, Wanted Dead or Alive and I Spy.

In 1979, she played many characters on Sears Radio Theater. She was the founder of California Artists Radio Theatre.

=== Other activities ===
Webber also wrote and directed "some 250 stage plays, radio and television programs". She was the writer and producer for Treasures of Literature, an early television program. In her later years, she was responsible for writing, directing, and producing "hundreds of new audio programs".

Webber and actor Ted Cassidy owned The New Hope Inn, a restaurant and performance space in Santa Monica. She also ran a theater company with actor Bob Denver.

== Personal life and death ==
Webber was married to Robert Marshall Sinskey from 1951 until they divorced in 1967. She was later married to Sean McClory from 1983 until his death in 2003. She had three children. Webber was close friends with actors Lee Marvin and Paul Fix, with each of them being godfathers to Webber's first two children.

In 1952, Webber moved to Japan so that her then-husband Sinskey could work as a researcher for the Atomic Bomb Casualty Commission. She later lived in Los Angeles until she was forced to evacuate due to the wildfires in Southern California in early 2025.

Webber turned 100 in September 2025, and died at a retirement facility in Napa, California, on August 15, 2026.

== Recognition ==
Webber received the 2014 Norman Corwin Award for Excellence in Audio Theatre, "which celebrates a lifetime of achievement in this sonic art". She was the first woman so honored. Her program Treasure of Literature was named Most Popular Television Program – 1949 by the Television Academy.

== Selected filmography ==
Films
Year	Title	Role	Note	Ref.
1946	Her Adventurous Night	Miss Howard	Uncredited	
1948	Macbeth	Lady Macduff / The Three		
1951	Journey Into Light	Jane Burrows		
1951	Submarine Command	Alice Rice		
1956	The Wrong Man	Alice Dennerly		
1958	The Screaming Skull	Jenni Whitlock		
1958	The Space Children	Anne Brewster		

Television
Year	Title	Role	Ref.
1952–1955	Dragnet	Peg Ruskin / Virginia Sterling / Leona Perry / Police dispatcher / Roberta Salazar	
1955	The Public Defender	Mrs. Gayley	
1955	Medic	Stell Ramsey	
1955	The Whistler	Denise Clark	
1955	Big Town	Carla Jackson	
1956	Damon Runyon Theater	Claire Simpson	
1956	Front Row Center	Kathy Mullin	
1956	Cheyenne	Ella McIntyre	
1956	Climax!	Inez Harley	
1956	The Millionaire	Mildred Kester	
1957	Dick Powell's Zane Grey Theatre	Norah	
1957	Gunsmoke	Flora Stancil	
1957–1960	M Squad	Mary Nichols / Amy Pryor	
1959	Wagon Train	Millie Collins	
1959	Wanted: Dead or Alive	Minnie Lee Blake	
1960	The Rebel	Juanita Flynn	
1967	I Spy	Sister Agatha	
1967–1970	Dragnet 1967	Jean Sawyer / Mrs. Atkins / Alice Philbin / Mrs. Mary Tucker/ Mrs Eunice Rustin / Marian Stanley / Mrs. Peggy Lassin / Janet Ohrmund	
1971–1972	Night Gallery	Old Crone / First Phone Operator	
1976	The Waltons	Eva Hadley	
1978	Project U.F.O.	Emma Smith / Helen Carson	

== See also ==
- List of centenarians (actors, filmmakers and entertainers)
