= In the Palace of the King =

1923 film by Emmett J. Flynn

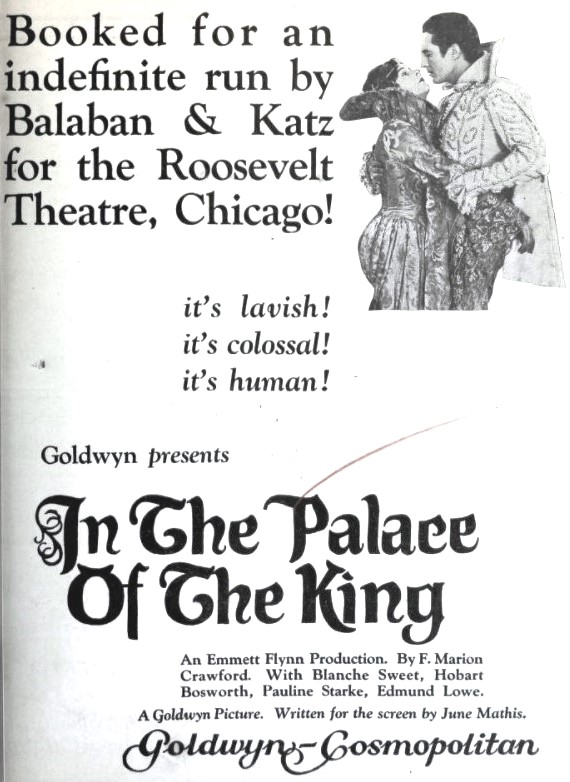
- Advertisement
- Directed by: Emmett J. Flynn
- Written by: June Mathis (adaptation)
- Based on: In the Palace of the King by F. Marion Crawford
- Produced by: Goldwyn Pictures
- Starring: Blanche Sweet; Pauline Starke; Edmund Lowe
- Cinematography: Lucien Andriot; Paul Ivano
- Distributed by: Goldwyn Pictures
- Release date: October 28, 1923
- Running time: 98 minutes
- Country: United States
- Language: Silent (English intertitles)

In the Palace of the King is a 1923 American silent historical romantic drama film based on the novel of the same name by F. Marion Crawford. Directed by Emmett J. Flynn, the film stars Blanche Sweet, Pauline Starke, and Edmund Lowe.

A previous silent version had been made and released in 1915 by the Essanay company and starred Richard Travers and Nell Craig. Prior to the films, the novel was adapted into a Broadway play in 1900 starring Viola Allen and her father C. Leslie Allen.

== Plot ==
As described in a film magazine review, Don John, brother of Philip II of Spain, is sent to war with the Moors, the king wishing to be rid of him. Don John loves Dolores, daughter of General Mendoza, but her father does not trust him. Returning in triumph, Don John quarrels with Philip, who stabs him with apparent fatal effect. To save the King, Mendoza assumes the guilt of murder. Dolores threatens Philip with exposure and he signs a pardon for Mendoza. Don John reappears and receives Philip's royal consent for his marriage to Dolores.

== Cast ==
- Blanche Sweet as Dolores Mendoza
- Edmund Lowe as Don John
- Hobart Bosworth as Mendoza
- Pauline Starke as Inez Mendoza
- Sam De Grasse as King Philip II
- William V. Mong as Perez
- Aileen Pringle as Princess Eboli
- Lucien Littlefield as Adonis
- Charles Clary as Gomez
- Harvey Clarke as Alphonso
- Tom Bates as Eudaldo
- H.N. Clugston as Chamberlain
- Charles Gorham as Guard
- Jack Pitcairn as Captain of the Guard
- David Kirby as Guard
- Cammilla Johnson as Little Girl
- Seessel Anne Johnson as Little Girl

== Preservation ==
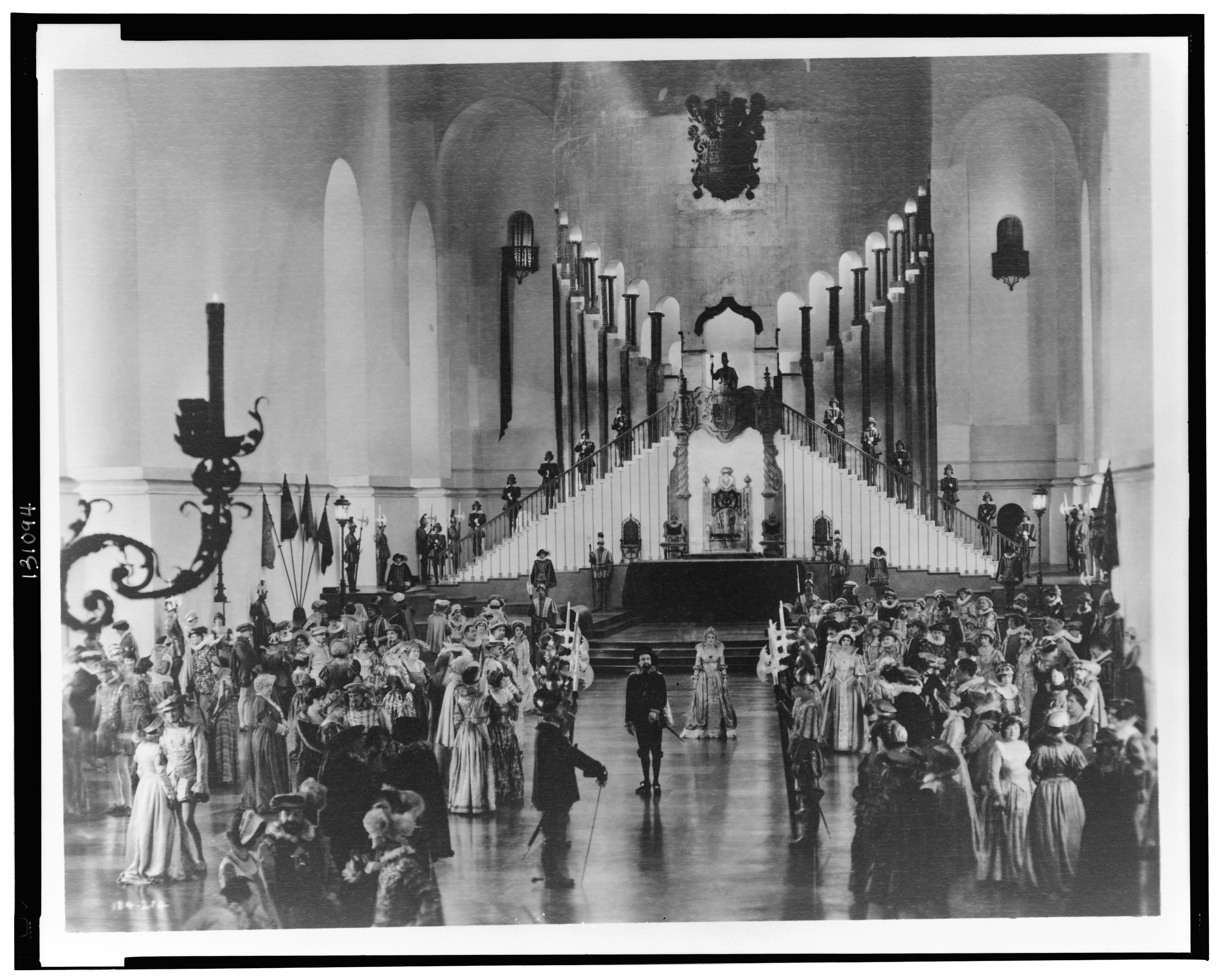
Still of palace interior

With no copies of In the Palace of the King located in any film archives, it is a lost film.

== See also ==
- Blanche Sweet filmography
