= The Upper Berth =

- Short story by Francis Marion Crawford

Text available at Wikisource
- Country: United States
- Language: English
- Genre: Ghost story

Publication
- Published in: The Broken Shaft: Tales in Mid-Ocean
- Publisher: T. Fisher Unwin
- Media type: Print (magazine)
- Publication date: 1885

"The Upper Berth" is a ghost story by American writer Francis Marion Crawford, first published in The Broken Shaft: Tales in Mid-Ocean in 1885.

== Plot summary ==
In the framing device, the narrator is smoking and drinking with a group of acquaintances. After the conversation becomes dull, one of the attendees, Brisbane, seizes their attention by remarking that he has seen a ghost. "The situation was saved; Brisbane was going to tell a story."

Brisbane recounts that one June he was obliged to cross the Atlantic Ocean, making the journey on the steamship Kamtschatka. On this occasion, Brisbane was placed in the lower berth of cabin 105. The steward who shows him to cabin 105 appears uneasy. That night, Brisbane sees his cabinmate, a tall, thin, pale man, enter the cabin. During the night, Brisbane is awoken when his cabinmate springs from the upper berth and rushes out of the cabin. When Brisbane awakens the following morning, the cabin is cold and damp, and the porthole is fastened open; he appears to hear his cabinmate groaning in his bunk.

Brisbane speaks to the ship's doctor, who is perturbed to hear he is staying in cabin 105. The doctor invites Brisbane to share his cabin, telling him that on the Kamtschatka's last three trips, people sleeping in cabin 105 have gone overboard. After breakfast, Brisbane is summoned to see the ship's captain, who tells him that his cabinmate has disappeared. Brisbane declines the captain's invitation to move to another cabin. Returning to cabin 105 that evening, Brisbane is angered to see the porthole once again fastened open; he berates the steward, who claims that the porthole opens itself at night-time. During the night, Brisbane awakens to find the porthole fastened open. While watching the porthole, Brisbane again hears a groaning in the upper berth. Thrusting his hands through its curtains, he encounters "a clammy oozy mass [...] heavy and wet, yet endowed with a sort of supernatural strength". The ghostly creature rushes out of the cabin; Brisbane pursues it, but loses it in the passage. Returning to the cabin, Brisbane finds that it smells of seawater, and that the porthole is open yet again.

The next day, Brisbane discusses the matter with the ship's doctor, who declines his invitation to spend a night in the cabin to solve the mystery. The captain agrees to stand watch with Brisbane. The ship's carpenter examines the cabin, but finds nothing amiss. That night, as Brisbane and the captain stand watch, the captain mentions that the first passenger to have disappeared from cabin 105 was a "lunatic" who jumped overboard, while the second passenger seemingly threw himself out of the porthole. As the two men talk, the cabin's lantern is extinguished, and the porthole opens despite their attempts to hold it shut. Brisbane tackles a ghostly creature in the upper berth that is "like the body of a man long drowned, and yet it moved, and had the strength of ten men living", but is overpowered; the creature breaks his forearm and knocks the captain unconscious, then departs through the porthole.

Brisbane recounts that the ship's carpenter later screwed shut the door of cabin 105, and that passengers on the Kamtschatka are now told that it is engaged. Neither the captain nor Brisbane ever sail on the ship again. Brisbane concludes that "It was a very disagreeable experience, and I was very badly frightened, which is a thing I do not like. That is all. That is how I saw a ghost—if it was a ghost. It was dead, anyhow."

== Publication ==
"The Upper Berth" was first published in The Broken Shaft: Tales in Mid-Ocean (an annual published by T. Fisher Unwin) in 1885. In 1911, it was collected in Crawford's book Uncanny Tales (also titled Wandering Ghosts). It has since been anthologised many times, including in Roald Dahl's Book of Ghost Stories in 1983. In 1926, it was published in volume 7, issue 6 of Weird Tales (with the framing device removed). In 1963, it was published in True Twilight Tales under the alternate title "What Was in the Upper Berth?".

== Reception ==
In his 1929 article "Some Remarks on Ghost Stories", ghost story writer M. R. James stated that "Marion Crawford and his horrid story of 'The Upper Berth', which (with 'The Screaming Skull' some distance behind) is the best in his collection of Uncanny Tales, and stands high among ghost stories in general." H. P. Lovecraft described the story as "Crawford's weird masterpiece" and "one of the most tremendous horror-stories in all literature." H. Russell Wakefield, in an essay on ghost stories, identified "The Upper Berth" as "the very best one" of such stories. Writing for Reactor, Ruthanna Emrys and Anne M. Pillsworth described "The Upper Berth" as "...a comfortingly old-fashioned ghost story [...] the sort of yarn that's induced pleasant shivers at late-night parties for centuries."

== Adaptations ==
In October 1950, issue 20 of the horror comic Tales from the Crypt adapted "The Upper Berth" under the title "The Thing from the Sea!", with Al Feldstein writing and illustrating.

On 24 December 1972, "The Upper Berth" was read by Tom Vernon on the BBC Radio London programme Something from the Dark.

On 25 July 2001, "The Upper Berth" was featured on the BBC Choice programme Nick Moran Presents "The Fear".
