= Stephen Booth (writer) =

English crime-writer

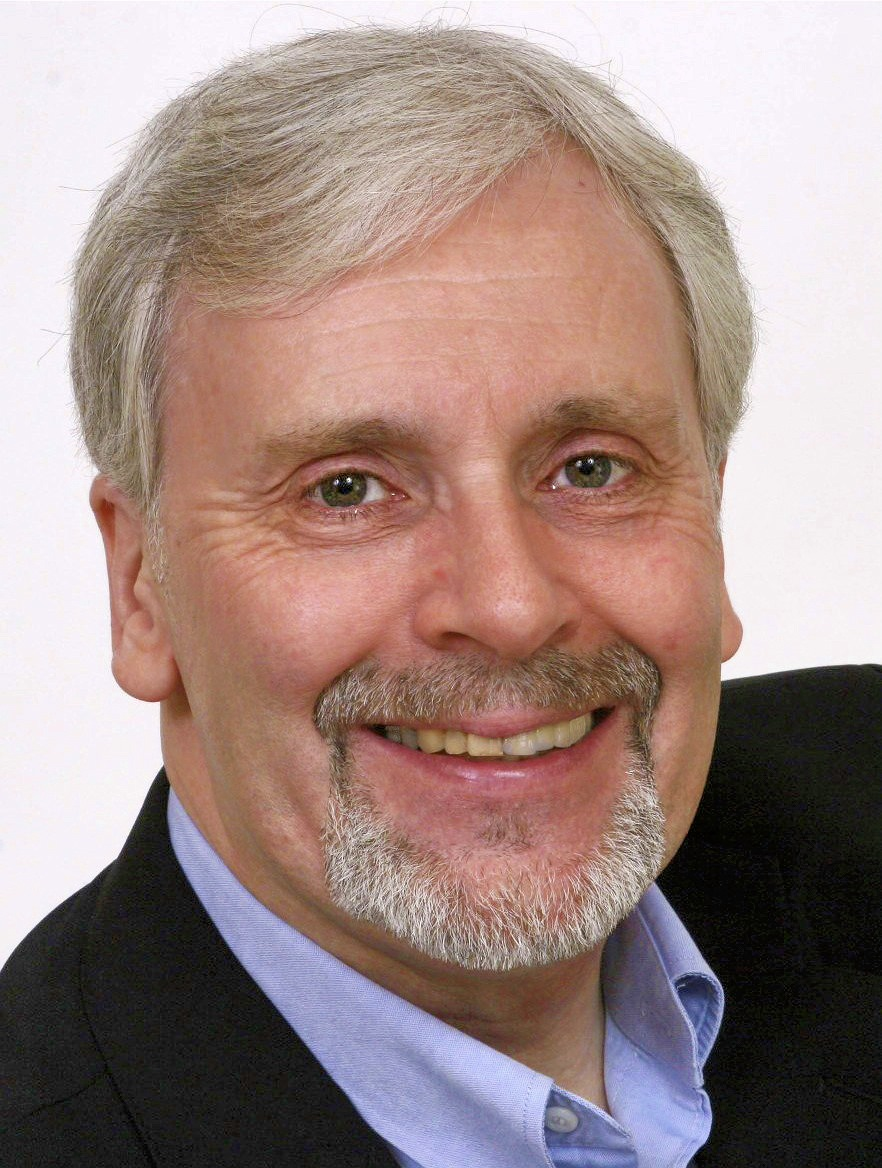
- Booth in 2021
- Born: 1952 (age 73–74); Burnley, Lancashire, England
- Education: Birmingham City University
- Writing career
- Genre: Crime fiction
- Website: stephen-booth.com/index.htm

Stephen Booth (born 1952) is an English crime-writer. He is the author of the Derbyshire-set Cooper and Fry series.

== Early and personal life ==
Booth was born in Burnley, Lancashire, the son of Jim and Edna Booth. At the age of two, he moved with his parents to Blackpool where he attended Arnold School. He lives with his wife Lesley in Retford, Nottinghamshire.

== Career ==
For over 27 years, he was a journalist for various newspapers and magazines including the Wilmslow Advertiser, Huddersfield Examiner, and the Worksop Guardian. He also worked as a sub-editor for the Daily Express and The Guardian. In 2001 he gave this up to be a full-time novelist.

== Bibliography ==
Cooper and Fry series, about two young Derbyshire-based police detectives, Ben Cooper and Diane Fry, as they try to solve various murders:

1. Black Dog (2000)
2. Dancing with the Virgins (2001)
3. Blood on the Tongue (2002)
4. Blind to the Bones (2003)
5. One Last Breath (2004)
6. The Dead Place (2005)
7. Scared to Live (2006)
8. Dying to Sin (2007)
9. The Kill Call (2009)
10. Lost River (2010)
11. The Devil's Edge (2011)
12. Dead and Buried (2012)
13. Already Dead (2013)
14. The Corpse Bridge (2014)
15. The Murder Road (2015)
16. Secrets of Death (2016)
17. Dead in the Dark (2017)
18. Fall Down Dead (2018)

Ben Cooper novella:

- Claws (2007)

Stand-alone novels:

1. Top Hard (2011)
2. Drowned Lives (2019)

== Awards and nominations ==
- 2001 – Barry Award for Best British Crime Novel: Black Dog
- 2001 – Crime Writers' Association Gold Dagger for Best Crime Novel of the Year (shortlist): Dancing with the Virgins
- 2002 – Barry Award for Best British Crime Novel: Dancing With the Virgins
- 2003 – Dagger in the Library
- 2006 – Theakston's Old Peculier Crime Novel of the Year Award (shortlist): One Last Breath
- 2007 – Theakston's Old Peculier Crime Novel of the Year Award (shortlist): The Dead Place

== Adaptation ==
A television series adaptation Cooper and Fry aired in the United Kingdom on Channel 5 in November 2025, with Mandip Gill as Fry and Robert James-Collier as Cooper. The series consists of four 1.5 hour episodes, each based on a different novel in the series:

- Black Dog (episode 2)
- Dying to Sin (episode 1)
- Blind to the Bones (episode 3)
- Dancing with the Virgins (episode 4)
