= Francis Marion Crawford =

American novelist (1854–1909)

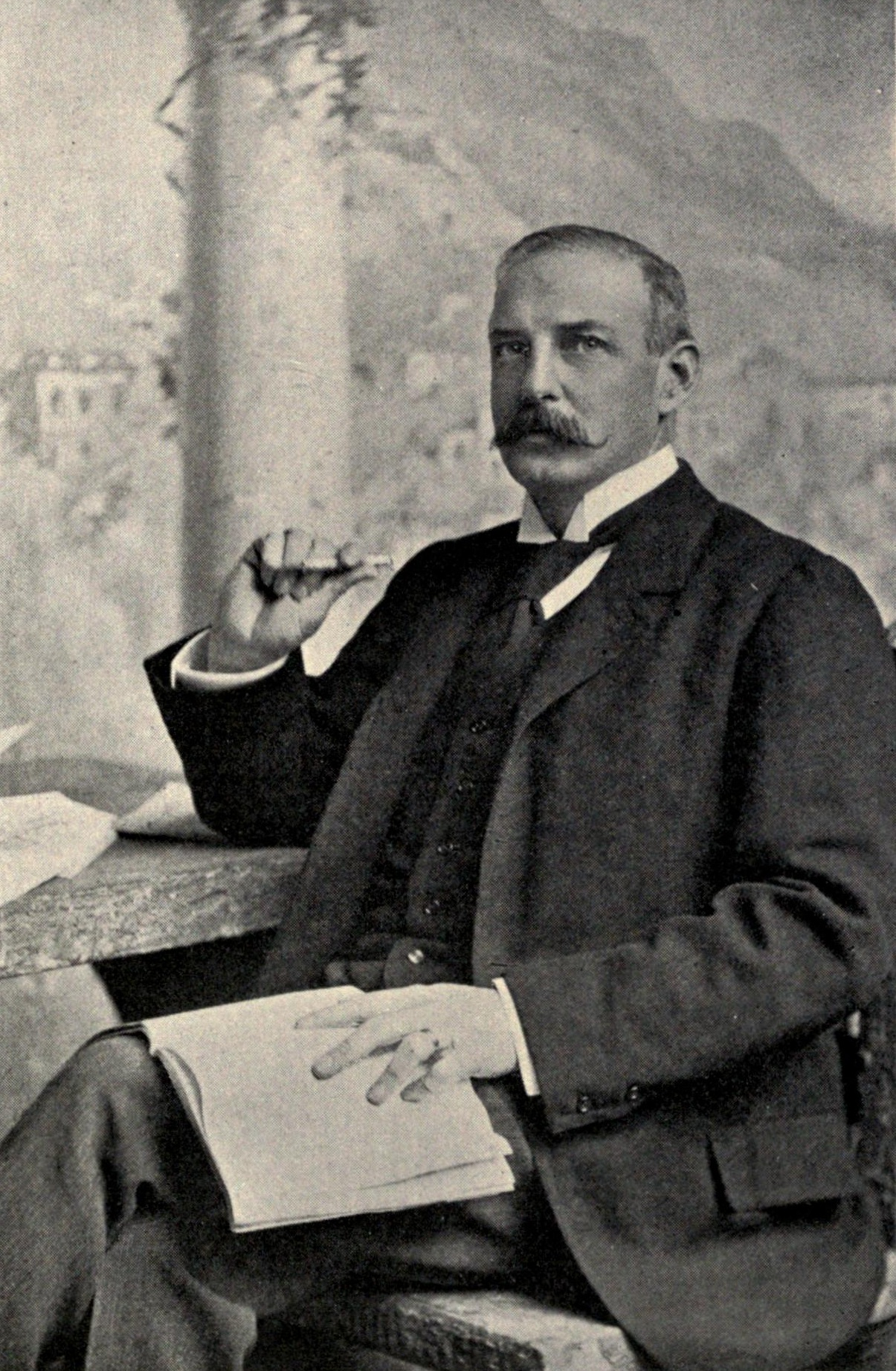
- Born: August 2, 1854; Bagni di Lucca, Grand Duchy of Tuscany
- Died: April 9, 1909 (aged 54); Villa Crawford in Sant'Agnello, Kingdom of Italy
- Education: St Paul's School; Cambridge University; University of Heidelberg; University of Rome; Harvard University
- Occupation: Writer
- Spouse: Elizabeth Berdan (after 1884)
- Children: 4
- Parent(s): Thomas Crawford; Louisa Cutler Ward
- Relatives: Mary Crawford Fraser (sister); Julia Ward Howe (aunt)

Signature
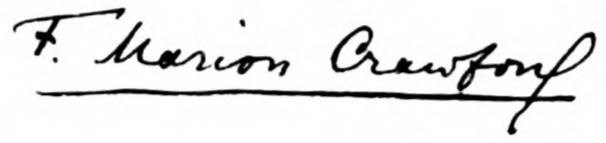

Francis Marion Crawford (August 2, 1854 – April 9, 1909) was an expatriate American writer noted for his many novels, especially those set in Italy, and for his classic supernatural fiction.

== Early life ==
Crawford was born in Bagni di Lucca, in the Grand Duchy of Tuscany, on August 2, 1854. He was the only son of the American sculptor Thomas Crawford and Louisa Cutler Ward. His sisters were the writers Mary Crawford Fraser (aka Mrs. Hugh Fraser) and Anne Crawford, Baroness von Rabé, and he was the nephew of Julia Ward Howe, the American poet. After his father's death in 1857, his mother remarried to Luther Terry, with whom she had Crawford's half-sister, Margaret Ward Terry, who later became the wife of Winthrop Astor Chanler.

He studied successively at St Paul's School, Concord, New Hampshire; Cambridge University; University of Heidelberg; and the University of Rome.

In 1879, he went to India, where he studied Sanskrit and edited The Indian Herald in Allahabad. While there Crawford came across the jewel trader A. M. Jacob, who was the inspiration for the main character of his first novel. Returning to America in February 1881, he continued to study Sanskrit at Harvard University for a year and for two years contributed to various periodicals, mainly The Critic. Early in 1882, he established his lifelong close friendship with Isabella Stewart Gardner.

During this period he lived most of the time in Boston at his aunt Julia Ward Howe's house and in the company of his uncle, Sam Ward. His family was concerned about his financial prospects. His mother had hoped he could train in Boston for a career as an operatic baritone based on his private renditions of Schubert lieder. In January 1882, George Henschel, conductor of the Boston Symphony Orchestra, assessed his prospects and determined Crawford would "never be able to sing in perfect tune". Ward suggested that he try writing about his years in India, particularly urging him to write a novel based on Jacob's exploits there, and helped him develop contacts with New York publishers.

== Career ==
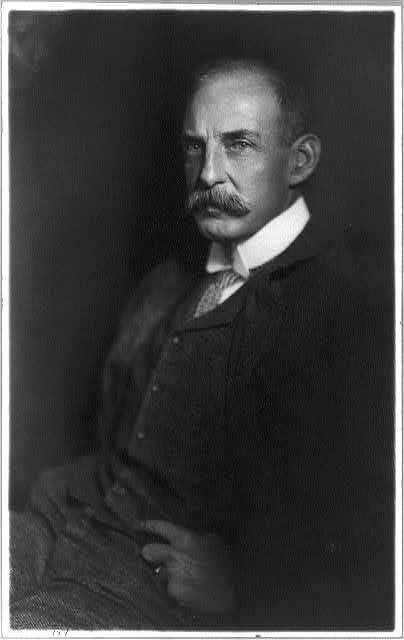
Francis Marion Crawford, ca. 1904

In December 1882, he produce his first novel, Mr Isaacs, a sketch of modern Anglo-Indian life mingled with a touch of Oriental mystery. It had an immediate success, and Dr Claudius (1883) followed promptly. In May 1883, he returned to Italy, where he made his permanent home. He lived at the historic Hotel Cocumella in Sorrento during 1885 and settled permanently in Sant'Agnello, where in the fall he bought the Villa Renzi that became Villa Crawford. More than half his novels are set in Italy. He wrote three long historical studies of Italy and was well advanced with a history of Rome in the Middle Ages when he died. This may explain why Marion Crawford's books stand apart from any distinctively American current in literature.

Year by year Crawford published a number of successful novels. However his 1896 novel Adam Johnstone's Son was thought by the late nineteenth century English novelist George Gissing to be "rubbish". Late in the 1890s, Crawford began to write his historical works. These are: Ave Roma Immortalis (1898), Rulers of the South (1900) renamed Southern Italy and Sicily and The Rulers of the South in 1905 for the American market, and Gleanings from Venetian History (1905) with the American title Salvae Venetia, reissued in 1909 as Venice; the Place and the People. In these, his intimate knowledge of local Italian history combines with the romanticist's imaginative faculty to excellent effect. His shorter book Constantinople (1895) belongs to this category.

After most of his fictional works had been published, most came to think he was a gifted narrator; and his books of fiction, full of historic vitality and dramatic characterization, became widely popular among readers to whom the realism of problems or the eccentricities of subjective analysis were repellent. In The Novel: What It Is (1893), he defended his literary approach, self-conceived as a combination of romanticism and realism, defining the art form in terms of its marketplace and audience. The novel, he wrote, is "a marketable commodity" and "intellectual artistic luxury" (8, 9) that "must amuse, indeed, but should amuse reasonably, from an intellectual point of view. . . . Its intention is to amuse and please, and certainly not to teach and preach; but in order to amuse well it must be a finely-balanced creation. . . ." (82).

The Saracinesca series is perhaps known to be his best work, with the third in the series, Don Orsino (1892) set against the background of a real estate bubble, told with effective concision. The second volume is Sant' Ilario [Hilary] (1889). A fourth book in the series, Corleone (1897), was the first major treatment of the Mafia in literature, and used the now-familiar but then-original device of a priest unable to testify to a crime because of the Seal of the Confessional; the novel is not one of his major works, having failed to live up to the standard set by the books earlier in the series. Crawford ended Rulers of the South (1900) with a chapter about the Sicilian Mafia.

Crawford himself was fondest of Khaled: A Tale of Arabia (1891), a story of a genie (genius is Crawford's word) who becomes human, which was reprinted (1971) in the Ballantine Adult Fantasy series of the early 1970s. A Cigarette-Maker's Romance (1890) was dramatized, and had considerable popularity on the stage as well as in its novel form; and in 1902 an original play from his pen, Francesca da Rimini, was produced in Paris by his friend Sarah Bernhardt. Crawford's best known dramatization was that of The White Sister (1909). Its main actress was Viola Allen, whose first film was the 1915 film of this novel; it was filmed again in 1923 and 1933. In the Palace of the King (1900) was filmed in 1915 and 1923; Mr. Isaacs (1882) was filmed in 1931 as Son of India.

Several of his short stories, such as "The Upper Berth" (1886; written in 1885), "For the Blood Is the Life" (1905, a vampiress tale), "The Dead Smile" (1899), and "The Screaming Skull" (1908), are often-anthologized classics of the horror genre. An essay on Crawford's weird tales can be found in S. T. Joshi's The Evolution of the Weird Tale (2004); there are many other essays and introductions. The collected weird stories were posthumously published in 1911 as Wandering Ghosts in the U.S. and as Uncanny Tales in the UK, both without the long-forgotten "The King's Messenger" (1907). The present definitive edition is that edited by Richard Dalby as Uncanny Tales and published by the Tartarus Press (1997; 2008). Crawford's novella Man Overboard! (1903) is often overlooked, but belongs with his supernatural works.

In 1901, the American Macmillan firm began a deluxe uniform edition of his novels, as reprintings required. In 1904 the P. F. Collier Co. (N. Y.) was authorized to publish a 25-volume edition, later increased to 32 volumes. Around 1914 the subscription firm McKinlay, Stone, Mackenzie was authorized to publish an edition using the Macmillan binding decorations. In 1919 the American Macmillan firm published the "Sorrento Edition". They also had issued some first American editions and reprints in a uniform binding from 1891 through 1899. The British Macmillan firm used two separate uniform bindings from 1889 until after 1910.

Crawford wrote numerous articles for major periodicals and a few contributions to books. See the section "Bibliographical History" in An F. Marion Crawford Companion (1981) by John C. Moran.

== Personal life ==
In 1880, Crawford converted to Roman Catholicism. In October 1884 he married Elizabeth Berdan, the daughter of the American Civil War Union General Hiram Berdan. They had two sons and two daughters, Eleanor, Harold, Clara and Bertram.

Crawford died at Sorrento on Good Friday 1909 at Villa Crawford of a heart attack. It was the result of a severe lung injury ten years previous, caused by inhalation of toxic gases at a glass-smelting works in Colorado, which happened during his American lecture tour in the winter of 1897–1898. He was gathering technical information for his historical novel Marietta (1901), that describes glass-making in late medieval Venice. After his death, his widow sued for breach of contract related to the production of Crawford's novels into a film.

=== Legacy and influence ===
In his 1929 article "Some Remarks on Ghost Stories" M. R. James praised Crawford's supernatural fiction. James stated that "Marion Crawford and his horrid story of 'The Upper Berth', which (with 'The Screaming Skull' some distance behind) is the best in his collection of Uncanny Tales, and stands high among ghost stories in general." H. Russell Wakefield, in an essay on ghost stories, called Crawford's "The Upper Berth" "the very best one" of such stories. Norman Douglas credits Crawford's financial success as instrumental in encouraging himself to write (though he remained critical of Crawford's habit of inserting first-person editorial comments into his fiction).

The F. Marion Crawford Memorial Society was founded in 1975 and published the literary review The Romantist from 1977 until 1997. In 1997 the Centro Studi e Ricerche Francis Marion Crawford was founded at Sant'Agnello di Sorrento. It is formally associated with the FMC Memorial Society and continues The Romantist in its annual review Genius Loci (1997–).

In early May 1988 at Sant'Agnello, a Conference was held to commemorate Crawford. It was organized by the Comune di Sant' Agnello di Sorrento and the Istituto Universitario Orientale (Naples). Its "Acta" were published in English and Italian as Il Magnifico Crawford. Scrittore per Mestiere / The Magnificent Crawford. Writer by Trade (1990), edited by Gordon Poole. In mid-May 2009 the Centro Studi e Ricerche Francis Marion Crawford and the Comune di Sant' Agnello organized another Conference – Francis Marion Crawford; 100 Anni Dopo – to remember Crawford on the centenary of his death. Its "Acta" were published in Italian and English as Nuova Luce Su Francis Marion Crawford. Cento Anni Dopo 2009-1909 / A Hundred Years Later: New Light on Francis Marion Crawford early in 2011, edited by Gordon Poole. The F. Marion Crawford Memorial Society collaborated in the organization of both Conferences.

There is a major street in the Italian town of Sant'Agnello di Sorrento (the town where he died) named after him, the Corso Marion Crawford. There is a historical marker on the house where Crawford was born, in Bagni di Lucca. Villa Crawford was donated many years ago by Crawford's daughters Lady Eleanor Rocca-Crawford and Mother Clare Marion-Crawford to the Salesian Sisters, who operate it today as a high school for girls.

In San Nicola Arcella, in the province of Cosenza, the Saracen tower where Francis Marion Crawford stayed in the summer is remembered as Torre Crawford. In 2020, the writer Andrea Carlo Cappi with Matteo Fazzolari and Cosimo Gentile, created the literary prize for short story "Torre Crawford", whose annual theme is taken from a short story by Francis Marion Crawford (the theme of the first edition was "For the blood is the life ").

== Bibliography ==
=== Novels ===
- Mr. Isaacs: A Tale of Modern India (1882)
- Dr. Claudius (1883)
- To Leeward (1884), actually late 1883. The second American edition (Macmillan, 1893) is the only novel that Crawford substantively revised.
- A Roman Singer (1884); Bernhard Tauchnitz, Leipzig, Vol. 2254 of the Collection of British Authors. All of Crawford's novels, except for Love in Idleness (1893), were authorized by him for inclusion in his friend Baron Tauchnitz's series Collection of British Authors, whose name was later changed to Collection of British and American Authors. The Tauchnitz editions do not take bibliographical precedence over the British and United States editions. See the Crawford section of the Bibliography of American Literature.
- An American Politician (1884); U.S. title-page has 1885.
- Zoroaster (1885), historical novel about the Persian religious leader.
- A Tale of a Lonely Parish (1886)
- Saracinesca (1887)
- Marzio's Crucifix (1887)
- Paul Patoff (1887)
- With the Immortals (1888)
- Greifenstein (1889)
- Sant' Ilario (1889); sequel to Saracinesca
- A Cigarette-Maker's Romance (1890)
- Khaled: A Tale of Arabia (1891)
- The Witch of Prague (1891)
- The Three Fates (1892)
- Don Orsino (1892); sequel to Sant' Ilario
- The Children of the King (1893)
- Pietro Ghisleri (1893)
- Marion Darche (1893)
- Katharine Lauderdale (1894) (partly written while Crawford was staying at the Sinclair House)
- Love in Idleness (1894)
- The Ralstons (1894); sequel to Katharine Lauderdale
- Casa Braccio (1895); related to Katharine Lauderdale and The Ralstons.
- Adam Johnstone's Son (1896)
- Taquisara (1896)
- A Rose of Yesterday (1897)
- Corleone (1897)
- Via Crucis (1899) historical novel about the Second Crusade.
- In the Palace of the King (1900) historical novel about Philip II of Spain.
- Marietta (1901) historical novel set in Venice in 1470.
- Cecilia (1902)
- Man Overboard! (1903) [novella]
- The Heart of Rome (1903)
- Whosoever Shall Offend (1904)
- Soprano (1905); U.S. title Fair Margaret.
- A Lady of Rome (1906)
- Arethusa (1907)
- The Little City of Hope (1907)
- The Primadonna (1908); sequel to Soprano / Fair Margaret
- The Diva's Ruby (1908); sequel to The Primadonna
- The White Sister (1909, first published as a serialized novel in Munsey's Magazine and adapted from his earlier play of the same name)
- Stradella (1909)
- The Undesirable Governess (1910)

=== Short stories ===
- "The Upper Berth" (1885)
- "By the Waters of Paradise" (1886)
- "The Dead Smile" (1899)
- "For the Blood Is the Life" (1905)
- "The King's Messenger" (1907)
- "The Screaming Skull" (1908)
- "Wandering Ghosts"; British title: "Uncanny Tales" (1911) (collection of seven stories)

=== Nonfiction ===
- Our Silver (1881) [pamphlet]
- The Novel: What It Is (1893)
- Constantinople (1895)
- Bar Harbor (1896)
- Ave Roma Immortalis (1898)
- Rulers of the South (1900; 1905 in the U.S. as Southern Italy and Sicily and The Rulers of the South)
- Gleanings from Venetian History (1905; in the U.S. as Salvae Venetia and in 1909 as Venice; the People and the Place)

=== Drama ===
- In the Palace of the King (1900); with Lorrimer Stoddard.
- Francesca da Rimini (1902). Written at the request of Crawford's good friend Sarah Bernhardt. Translated by Marcel Schwob (Paris: Charpentier et Fasquelle, 1902); new edition traduction de l'américain en français par Marcel Schwob, Sulliver, 1996. The English text was not published until 1980, with introductory matter, by The F. Marion Crawford Memorial Society. Ten unpublished copies of the English text were set up and printed for The Macmillan Company (New York City) in 1902 to copyright the text. The piece was adapted into an opera by Franco Leoni in 1904.
- Evelyn Hastings (1902). Unpublished typescript discovered in 2008.
- The White Sister (first written by Crawford in 1907 prior to the novel which was adapted from the 1907 play; later modified by Walter Hackett for the stage premiere at the Stone Opera House in Binghamton, New York on February 8, 1909)

== Filmography ==
- A Cigarette-Maker's Romance, directed by Frank Wilson (UK, 1913, based on the novella A Cigarette-Maker's Romance)
- The White Sister, directed by Fred E. Wright (1915, based on the play The White Sister by Crawford and Hackett)
- In the Palace of the King, directed by Fred E. Wright (1915, based on the novel In the Palace of the King)
- Whosoever Shall Offend, directed by Arrigo Bocchi (UK, 1919, based on the novel Whosoever Shall Offend)
- Il cuore di Roma, directed by Edoardo Bencivenga (Italy, 1919, based on the novel The Heart of Rome)
- A Cigarette-Maker's Romance, directed by Tom Watts (UK, 1920, based on the novella A Cigarette-Maker's Romance)
- Saracinesca, directed by Gaston Ravel (Italy, 1921, based on the novel Saracinesca)
- Sant' Ilario, directed by Henry Kolker (Italy, 1923, based on the novel Sant' Ilario)
- The White Sister, directed by Henry King (1923, based on the play The White Sister by Crawford and Hackett)
- In the Palace of the King, directed by Emmett J. Flynn (1923, based on the novel In the Palace of the King)
- Son of India, directed by Jacques Feyder (1931, based on the novel Mr. Isaacs)
- The White Sister, directed by Victor Fleming (1933, based on the play The White Sister by Crawford and Hackett)
- The Screaming Skull, directed by Alex Nicol (1958, named after the short story The Screaming Skull)
- The White Sister, directed by Tito Davison (Mexico, 1960, based on the play The White Sister by Crawford and Hackett)

== See also ==
- Crawford and Theosophy
- List of horror fiction authors
