= Hugh Fraser (diplomat) =

British diplomat (1837–1894)

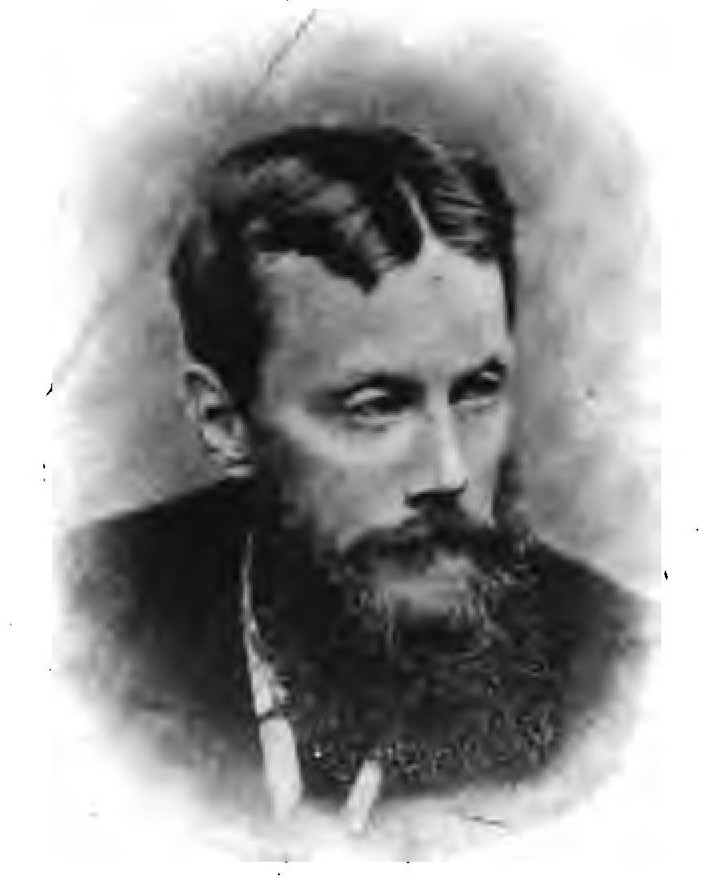

Envoy Extraordinary and Minister Plenipotentiary of the UK to Japan
- In office 1 May 1889 – 4 June 1894
- Monarchs: Queen Victoria; Emperor Meiji
- Preceded by: Sir Francis Plunkett
- Succeeded by: Power Henry Le Poer Trench

Personal details
- Born: 22 February 1837 Kent, England
- Died: 4 June 1894 (aged 57) Tokyo, Japan
- Spouse: Mary Crawford (m. 1874)
- Relations: See Clan Fraser
- Children: 1
- Education: Eton College

Hugh Fraser (22 February 1837 – 4 June 1894) was an English diplomat who served as the Envoy Extraordinary and Minister Plenipotentiary of the United Kingdom to the Japan Empire between 1889 and 1894.

== Early life ==
Fraser was born on 22 February 1837 in Kent, England and was the son of Sir John Fraser, KCMG (1792–1864), (Note: Hugh's father, Sir John Fraser, entered the British military in 1810, served in the 8th Light Dragoons until 1827. He served as aide-de-camp and Persian interpreter to the Commander-in-Chief in India, and, for many years, was secretary to Sir Henry George Ward, the Lord High Commissioner of the Ionian Islands. In 1853, Sir John received the order of Knight Commander of the Order of St Michael and St George for his official services and retired in 1854.) and Lady Selima Charlotte Baldwin (1798–1882), who married in 1834. He came from the Balnain (Inverness) branch of Clan Fraser, Scotland.

His paternal grandparents were William Mackenzie Fraser, Esq. M.D. of Balnain, Scotland, and Isabel Skinner (herself the fifth daughter of American-born General Cortlandt Skinner, a descendant of the Dutch colonial Schuyler family). (Note: Hugh's great-grandfather, General Cortlandt Skinner (1727–1799), a descendant of Stephanus Van Cortlandt, was the last Royal Attorney General of New Jersey and a Loyalist Brigadier general in the New Jersey Volunteers (also known as Skinner's Greens), during the American Revolutionary War. The Skinners fled the colonies in the summer of 1783 and moved to England where they permanently settled. His grandmother's sister, Maria Skinner, was married to Sir George Nugent, 1st Baronet.) His maternal grandfather was William Baldwin Esq. of Stede Hill near Harrietsham, Kent. Through his father, he was related to Charles Grant, 1st Baron Glenelg.

Fraser, like his father, attended Eton College from 1849 to 1854.

== Career ==
Just out of Eton and not quite eighteen, Fraser was appointed, as an unpaid attaché at The Hague in January 1855, and was sent to Dresden the following month. He moved to Copenhagen in November 1857 and passed an examination in August 1859 to become a paid attaché. He was appointed to the British legation in Central America in September 1862 and subsequently served in Stockholm, and Rome.

After a brief engagement of six weeks, Fraser and wife set out for Peking where Hugh Fraser served as Secretary of the Legation. For two years he served as Chargé d'Affaires while British Minister Sir Thomas Wade was on leave.

He was transferred to Vienna in 1879, to Rome in 1882, and was then appointed Minister at Santiago, Chile in 1885.

=== UK Minister to Japan ===
His appointment to Tokyo was announced in April 1888 and commenced on 1 May 1889. Fraser headed the British Legation in Tokyo as Envoy Extraordinary and Minister Plenipotentiary. He headed the British delegation in the final stages of the negotiations which led to the signing on 16 July 1894 of the revised treaty (called the Anglo-Japanese Treaty of Commerce and Navigation) between the United Kingdom and the Empire of Japan. This replaced the "unequal treaty" signed by James Bruce, 8th Earl of Elgin in 1858 and led to the abolition of extraterritoriality in Japan in 1899. Thus was Japan freed from the commercial and political burdens imposed by the unequal treaties signed with foreign countries.

== Personal life ==
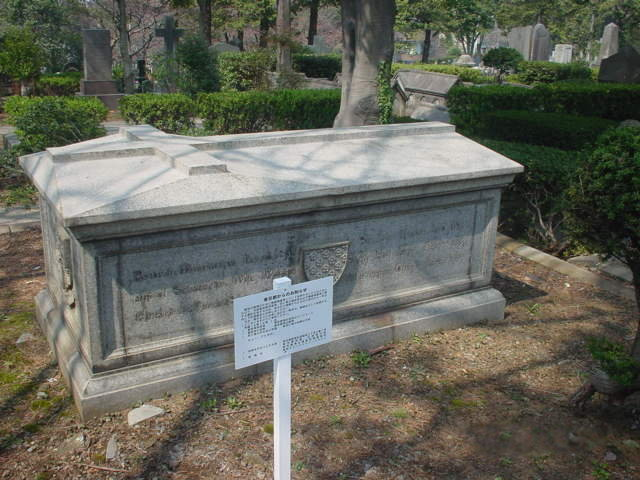
The grave of Hugh Fraser at Aoyama, Tokyo

On 25 June 1874, he met and married the American Mary Crawford in Italy. Mary was the daughter of prominent sculptor Thomas Crawford, and the sister of fellow author Francis Marion Crawford. She was also the niece of American poet Julia Ward Howe, and from her mother's remarriage (after the death of her father in 1857), she was the half-sister of Margaret Ward Terry, who later became the wife of Winthrop Astor Chanler. As Mrs. Hugh Fraser, Mary was the author of several memoirs and numerous works of fiction, eventually becoming better known than her husband. Together, they were the parents of two sons:

- John Fraser (1875–1931)
- Hugh Crawford Fraser (1876–1915), who became a Second lieutenant with the 3rd Battalion, the Royal Fusiliers in 1897.

Fraser died aged 57 in his post at Tokyo and was buried on 6 June 1894 in the foreigners' section of the municipal cemetery at Aoyama in central Tokyo. With a ceremonial procession arranged by the British architect Josiah Conder, the coffin was carried out of the British Legation at 3.00 pm, and reached St. Andrew's Church, Shiba Koen at 4.00 pm. Many mourners came to pay their respects, including Japanese government ministers and all the Foreign Representatives. The funeral service and committal were conducted by the Bishop Edward Bickersteth.

Obituaries were published in The Japan Weekly Mail and the Nichi Nichi Shinbun, a semi-official Japanese newspaper. The latter stated: "The singularly just and impartial views taken by him on all occasions were erroneously supposed... to be unwarrantably friendly to Japan... In private life, he was kind, modest, and reserved, winning the respect and love of everybody, both Japanese and foreign, that came into close contact with him. A man of firm resolution, he was never moved from the path of duty by the clamours of his nationals in the settlements."

== See also ==
- List of Ambassadors from the United Kingdom to Japan
- Anglo-Japanese relations
- Foreign cemeteries in Japan
