= United States Capitol cornerstone laying =

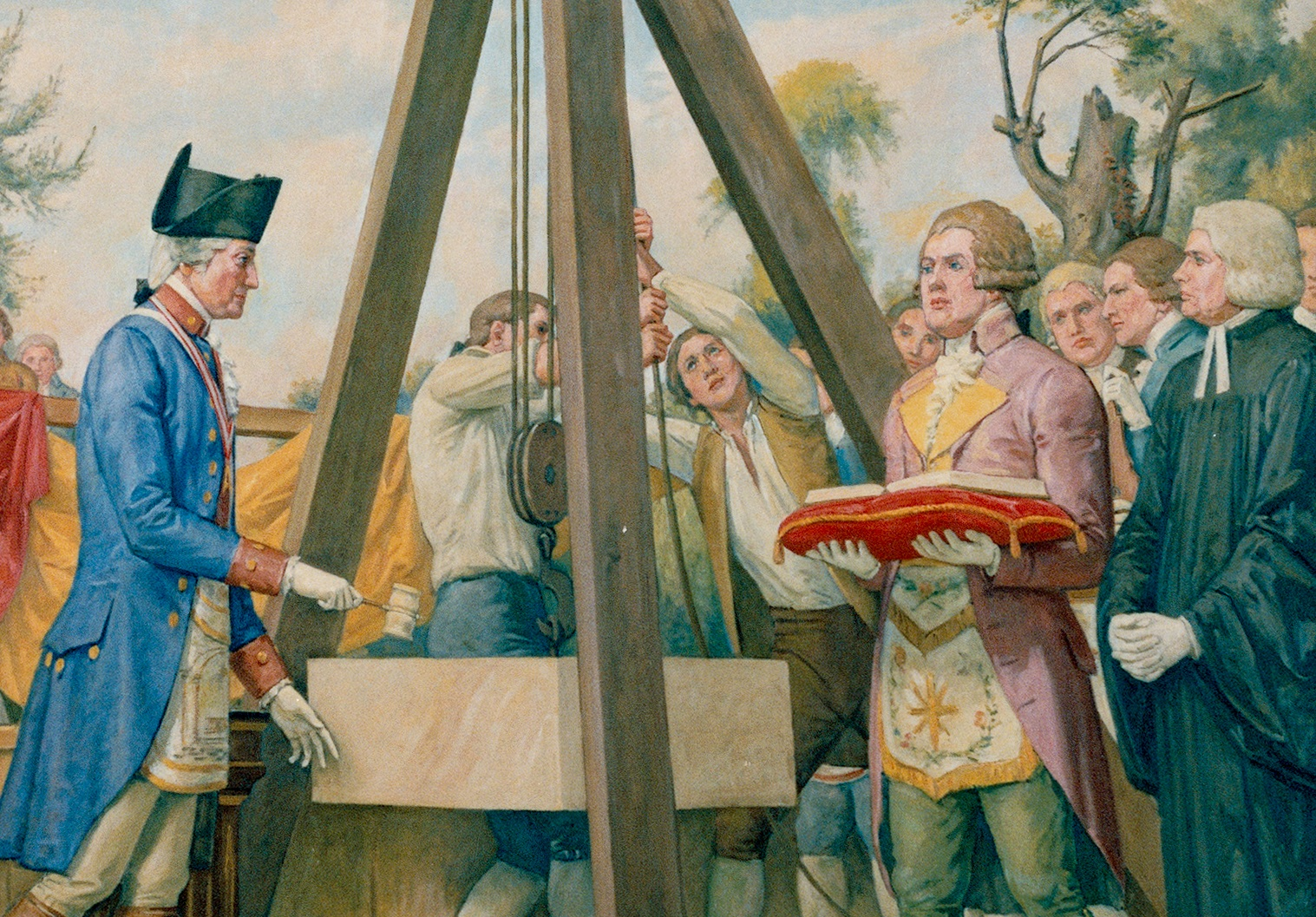
- George Washington depicted in a mural by Allyn Cox
- Date: September 18, 1793
- Venue: United States Capitol
- Location: Washington, D.C., U.S.
- Patron: George Washington

The United States Capitol cornerstone laying was the Freemasonic ceremonial placement of the cornerstone of the United States Capitol on September 18, 1793. The cornerstone was laid by president of the United States George Washington Leader of the Lodge of the Continental Army, assisted by the Grand Master of Maryland Joseph Clark, in a Masonic ritual.

Many of the items of ritual paraphernalia used in the cornerstone ceremony have been repurposed and are currently used for the placement of foundation stones at other important buildings in the greater Washington area. Centennial and bicentennial observances of the U.S. Capitol cornerstone laying were held in 1893 and 1993, respectively, and a tricentennial observance of the ritual has been announced for 2093.

== Background ==
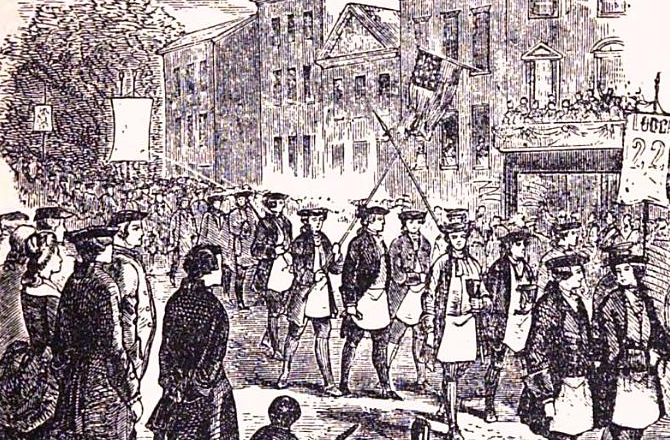
The procession to the United States Capitol

Workers began excavating the foundations of the United States Capitol in July 1793. During construction of the foundation, building commissioner David Stuart wrote to other members of the capitol commission suggesting a cornerstone ceremony be held. At their September 2 meeting, the commission agreed with Stuart, setting a date for the ceremony a little more than two weeks later.

== Ceremony ==
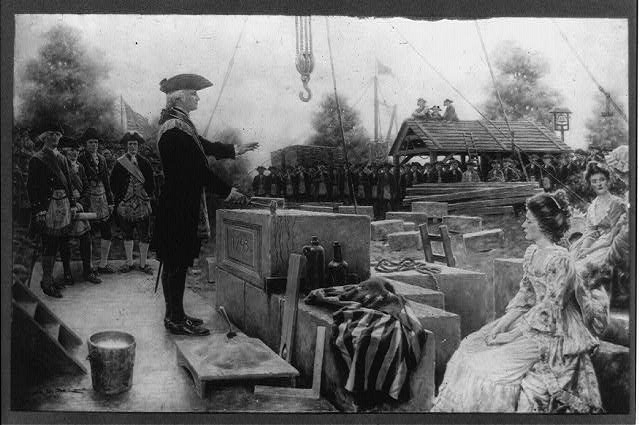
Washington laying the cornerstone of the U.S. Capitol in a photo reproduction of a painting

At 10:00 a.m. on September 18, President of the United States George Washington and his Masonic entourage crossed the Potomac River to arrive in Federal City (District of Columbia). There, they were joined by an escort consisting of the Alexandria Volunteer Artillery, and members of Masonic lodges from Virginia, Maryland, Georgetown, and Federal City. They proceeded to the construction grounds approximately 1.5 miles (2.4 km) away. At the site of the Capitol, Washington was received by Joseph Clark, the Grand Master of the Grand Lodge of Maryland. A silver plaque, fashioned by Georgetown silversmith Caleb Bentley, was handed to Washington, who stepped into the foundation trench and placed the plaque, whereupon the cornerstone was lowered. The plaque was inscribed with a brief tribute to the "military valor and prudence" of Washington, and dedicated the building in the "first year, of the second term, of the presidency of George Washington ... and in the year of Masonry 5,793."

Washington, accompanied by three Worshipful Masters carrying sacrifices of corn, wine, and oil, then struck the stone three times with a gavel, as prescribed by Masonic custom. Washington exited the trench to ritual chanting by the assembled Masons and a 15-gun salute (one gun for each U.S. state) from the Alexandria Volunteer Artillery. Clark then delivered a short invocation, after which a 500 pounds (230 kg) ox was slaughtered and roasted.

== Subsequent history ==
=== Artifacts ===
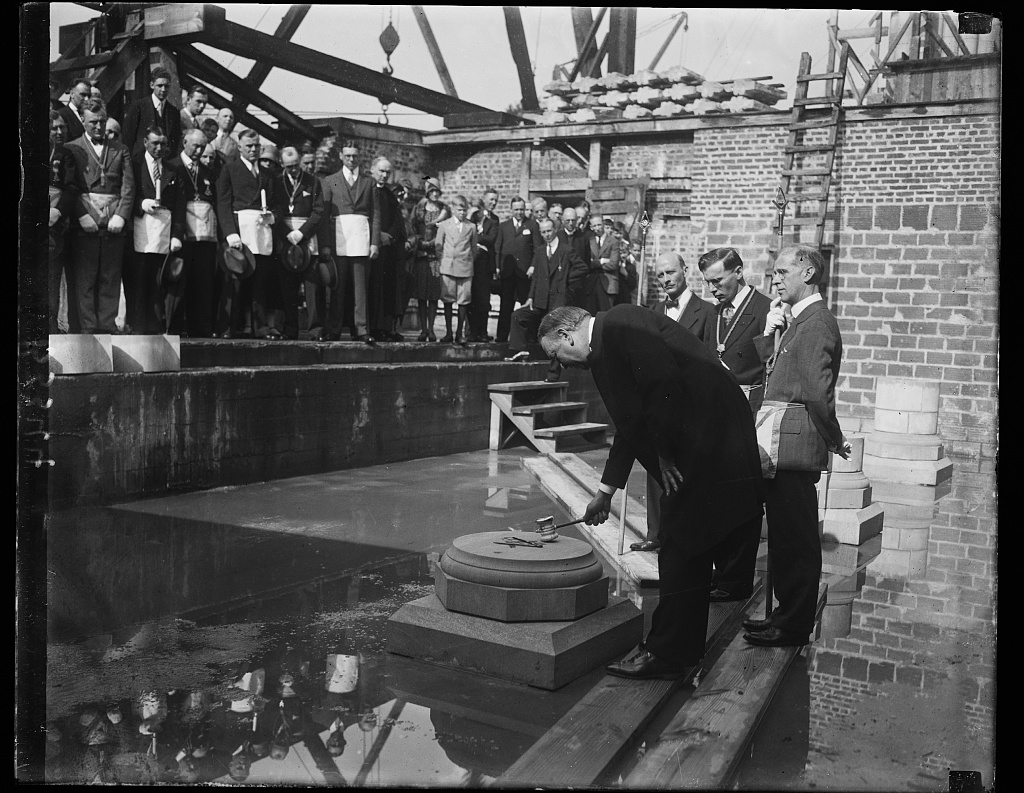
The Right Rev. James E. Freeman, Bishop of Washington, lays the cornerstone to the National Cathedral with the Washington gavel in 1929

Left: George White gestures at the cornerstone at an open excavation site in 1993. Right: The cornerstone to which White is pointing.

The apron and sash worn by George Washington during the cornerstone laying were, according to popular belief, embroidered several years earlier by the Marquise de La Fayette and gifted to Washington. Contemporary research indicates this may not be the case. The apron is currently owned by the Masonic Grand Lodge of Pennsylvania.

The trowel used by Washington during the ceremony is on display at the George Washington Masonic Memorial located in Alexandria, Virginia. Since the cornerstone laying, it has occasionally been used in other Masonic cornerstone ceremonies for important buildings in the Washington metropolitan area, including the Herbert Hoover Building, the chancery of the British embassy, the Jefferson Memorial, the Washington Monument, and the National Cathedral.

The gavel used to ceremonially strike the cornerstone three times was given by Washington to Valentine Reintzel, the Worshipful Master of Lodge 9 of Maryland, now Potomac Lodge No.5. After Reintzel's death in 1817, the gavel was donated to the lodge by his family. The lodge kept the gavel at its meeting place until 1922 when it was placed in the vault of Riggs National Bank, now a branch of PNC Bank, where it remains. It has occasionally been removed for important Masonic cornerstone ceremonies, including that of the National Cathedral and the Washington Monument.

The precise location of the cornerstone was lost during the two centuries following the ceremony due to attack and multiple expansions of the original building. In 1993, Architect of the Capitol George White, following a protracted search involving the use of ground-penetrating radar, electromagnetic induction and induced polarization, announced he had found a large stone buried beneath one section of the foundation that was "obviously a ceremonial stone," and declared it was probably the cornerstone of the building. No sign of the original silver plaque was discovered, and experts believe it may have been dislodged and destroyed during the 1850 construction of the Senate chambers.

=== Centennial, bicentennial, and tricentennial observances ===
lMasters of Prince Hall lodges arrive at the U.S. Capitol for the bicentennial of the cornerstone laying in 1993

A centennial rededication of the Capitol, roughly modeled after the cornerstone ceremony of 1793, was organized on September 18, 1893. The pre-ceremonial parade proceeded along the same route followed by Washington's entourage in 1793 and was led by President Grover Cleveland, who rode in the presidential state coach accompanied by a squadron of United States Army cavalry. The president was followed by a ceremonial escort formed into four divisions. The first division consisted of delegations from Masonic lodges and friendly societies. The second division was formed of contingents from lineage societies, including the Society of the Cincinnati, the Sons of the Revolution, and the Aztec Club of 1847. The third division included federal military forces, including units from the U.S. Army 3rd Field Artillery Regiment and the District of Columbia National Guard. The fourth division consisted of local fire brigades. At the capitol, the United States Marine Band provided music, accompanied by a 1,500-person choir. Opening remarks were delivered by Cleveland, followed by a two-hour speech by William Wirt Henry, a member of the Virginia House of Delegates and Patrick Henry's grandson. According to news reports of the day, 150,000 spectators attended the event.

A more modest bicentennial rededication occurred on September 18, 1993, organized by Architect of the Capitol George White. (After his appointment as Architect of the Capitol, White had been made a Mason-at-Sight, a rarely used mode of initiation in which a Grand Master instantly raises a non-Mason to the degree of Master Mason.) The 1993 ceremony was attended by the Grand Masters of each of the 50 grand lodges in the United States. At the time, White announced a tricentennial observance to occur on Friday, September 18, 2093.

=== Depictions ===
- On the U.S. Capitol's George Washington and the Revolutionary War Door by Thomas Crawford, 1868
- During the bicentennial of the cornerstone laying, John Melius, a former historical artist with the Smithsonian Institution, was commissioned by the Supreme Council of the Scottish Rite to paint an accurate representation of the ceremony. The oil-on-canvas painting currently hangs at the seat of the Supreme Council at the House of the Temple.
- On the side of the Washington Masonic National Memorial is a mural by Allyn Cox depicting Washington laying the cornerstone of the U.S. Capitol.
- A different mural in the chambers of the U.S. House of Representatives, also painted by Cox, depicts the cornerstone ceremony.
