= Anne Crawford (disambiguation) =

Anne Crawford was a British film actress.

Anne or Ann Crawford may also refer to:

== People ==
- Ann Street Barry (1734–1801), Mrs Crawford, British stage actress
- Anne Crawford Flexner (1874–1955), American playwright
- Anne Crawford-Lindsay (1631–1689), Duchess of Rothes
- Anne Crawford, Baroness von Rabé (1846 – 1912), Italian-born writer

== Fictional ==
- Anne Crawford (Taken), a character in the TV series Taken
- Ann Crawford, a character in the film What's Buzzin', Cousin? (played by Ann Miller)
