= Progress of Civilization Pediment =

Marble sculpture in Washington, D.C.

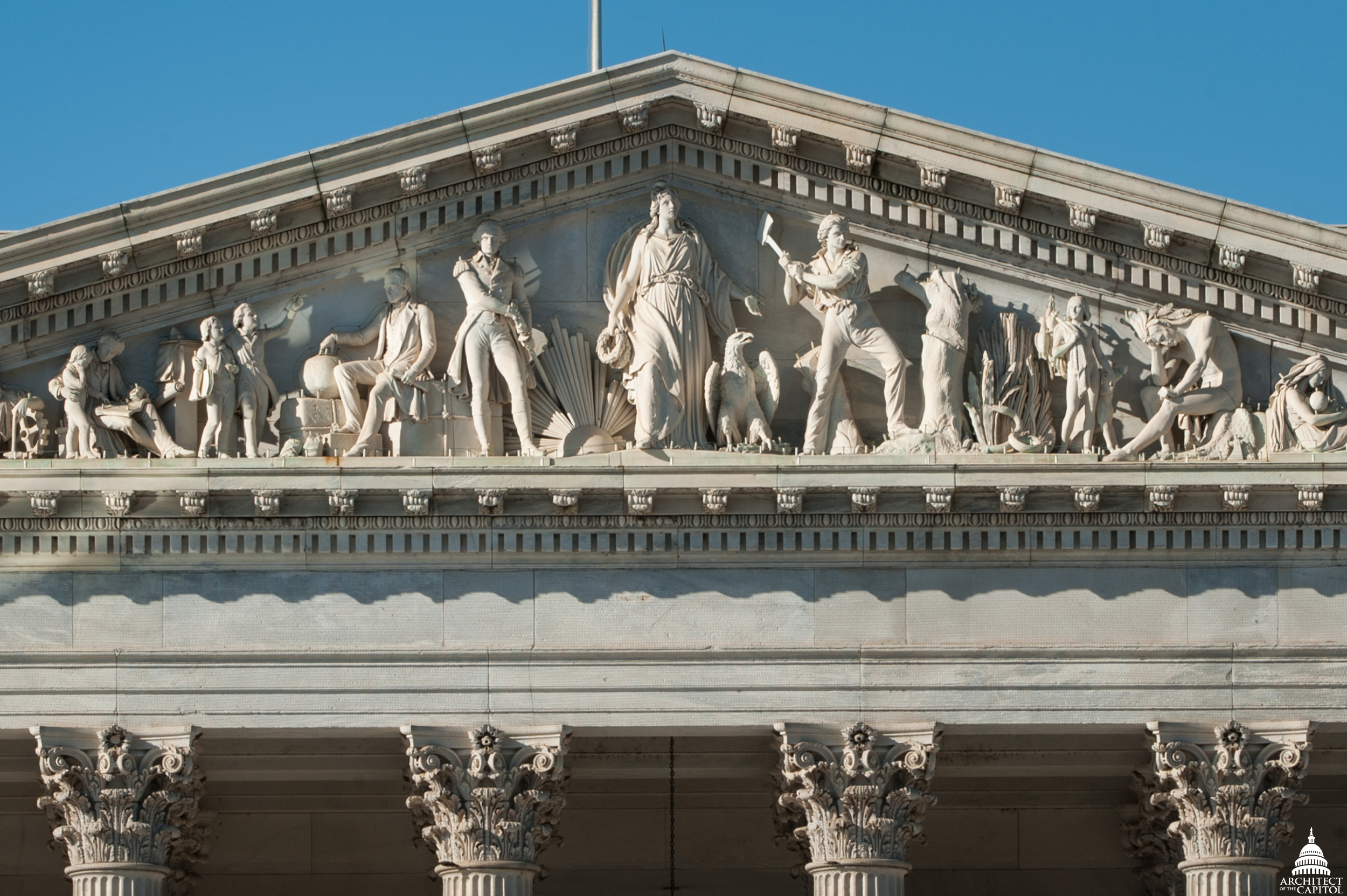
- Artist: Thomas Crawford
- Year: 1863
- Medium: Marble
- Dimensions: 366 cm × 1829 cm (144 in × 720 in)
- Location: Washington D.C.; 38.89072°N 77.00858°W

The Progress of Civilization is a marble pediment above the entrance to the Senate wing of the United States Capitol building designed by the sculptor Thomas Crawford. An allegorical personification of America stands at the center of the pediment. To her right, a white woodsman clears the wilderness inhabited by a Native American boy, father, mother, and child. The left side of the pediment depicts a soldier, a merchant, two schoolchildren, a teacher with her pupil, and a mechanic.

When it was originally completed, the pediment received positive reactions in the press. However, it has attracted more critical commentary from scholars since the 1990s.

The US Capitol building underwent a restoration program in 2016 which led to new discoveries about the pediment.

== Historical context ==
In 1850, Congress legislated the expansion of the Capitol building. Before design and construction began, there were several administrative changes which made it unclear who was in charge of the project. In 1851, President Filmore reinstated the position of the Architect of the Capitol and named Thomas U. Walker for the role. However, in 1853, administrative responsibilities were taken over by the Secretary of War, Jefferson Davis. Davis then selected Montgomery Meigs as the supervisor of the project. From this point, Meigs would make decisions and then forward them to Davis and the president for approval. Although he was in control, Meigs had to carefully navigate public opinion, particularly opposition to foreign artists. Meigs reached out to Edward Everett who recommended Hiram Powers and Thomas Crawford. Powers refused the offers because of previous disagreements with the government, so Crawford became the primary sculptor for the Capitol extension. In his letters to both Crawford and Powers, Meigs began to refine his vision for the pediment. He envisioned a building that "rivaled the Parthenon." He also had the theme of racial conflict in mind. He recognized that conflict with Native Americans was an ongoing issue at the time and wanted the pediment to reflect that.

== Figures ==
Art historian Kirsten Pai Buick argues against reading the pediment from left to right, suggesting instead that is anti-linear and should be viewed as two halves. Buick suggests that the right is the side of the damned (the Native Americans) and the left is the side of the saved (White Americans).

=== America ===
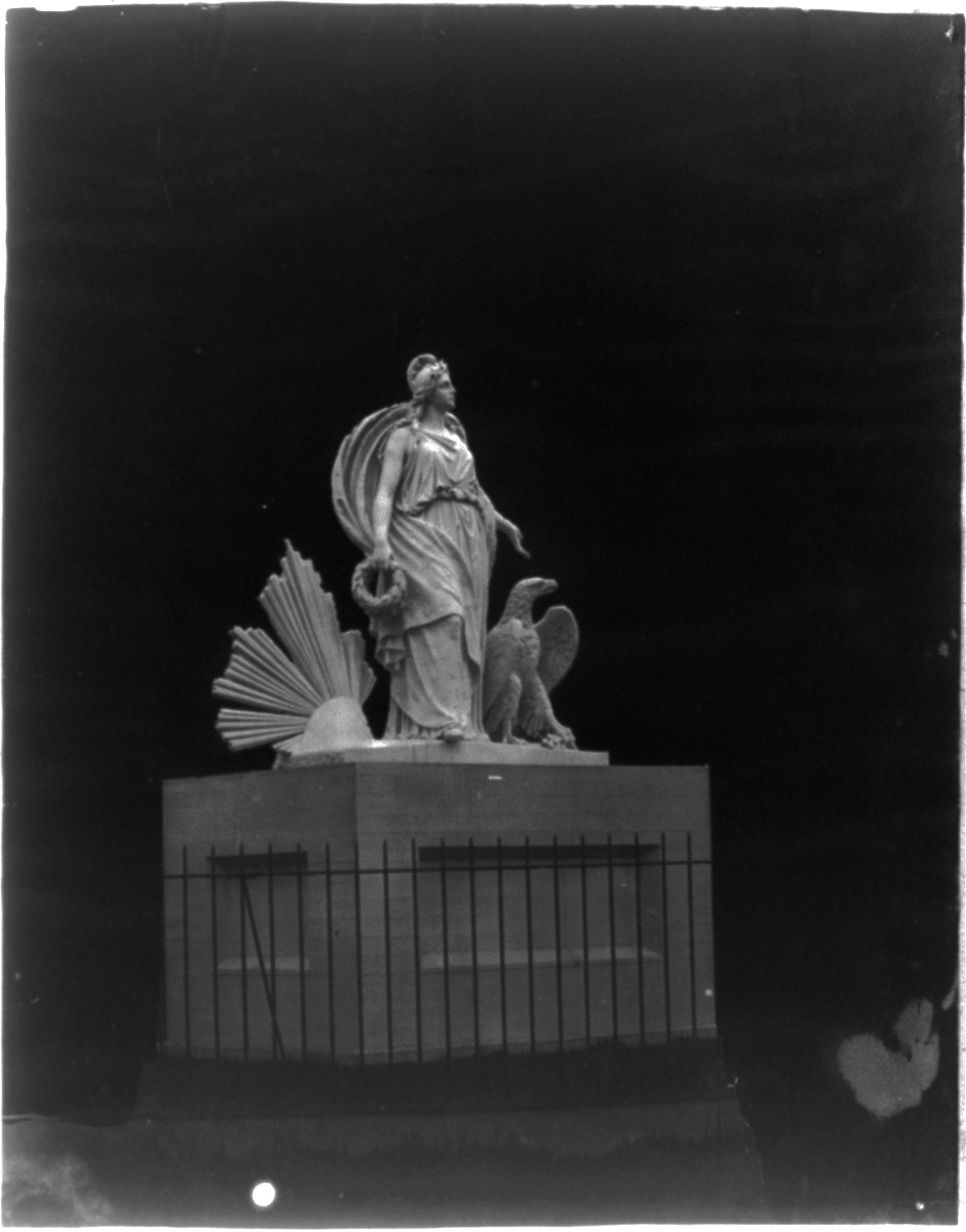
Central figure of American with eagle and sun

The central figure is a personification of America. She stands in contrapposto and is clothed in classical drapery. Her Phrygian cap and shawl are decorated in stars. The cap is a representation of liberty. Her right arm holds a laurel and oak wreath which represent civic and military merit while her left hand is outstretched in an appeal to heaven. Her head is also tilted heavenwards. An eagle is to her left and the sun rises at her feet.

=== Backwoodsman ===
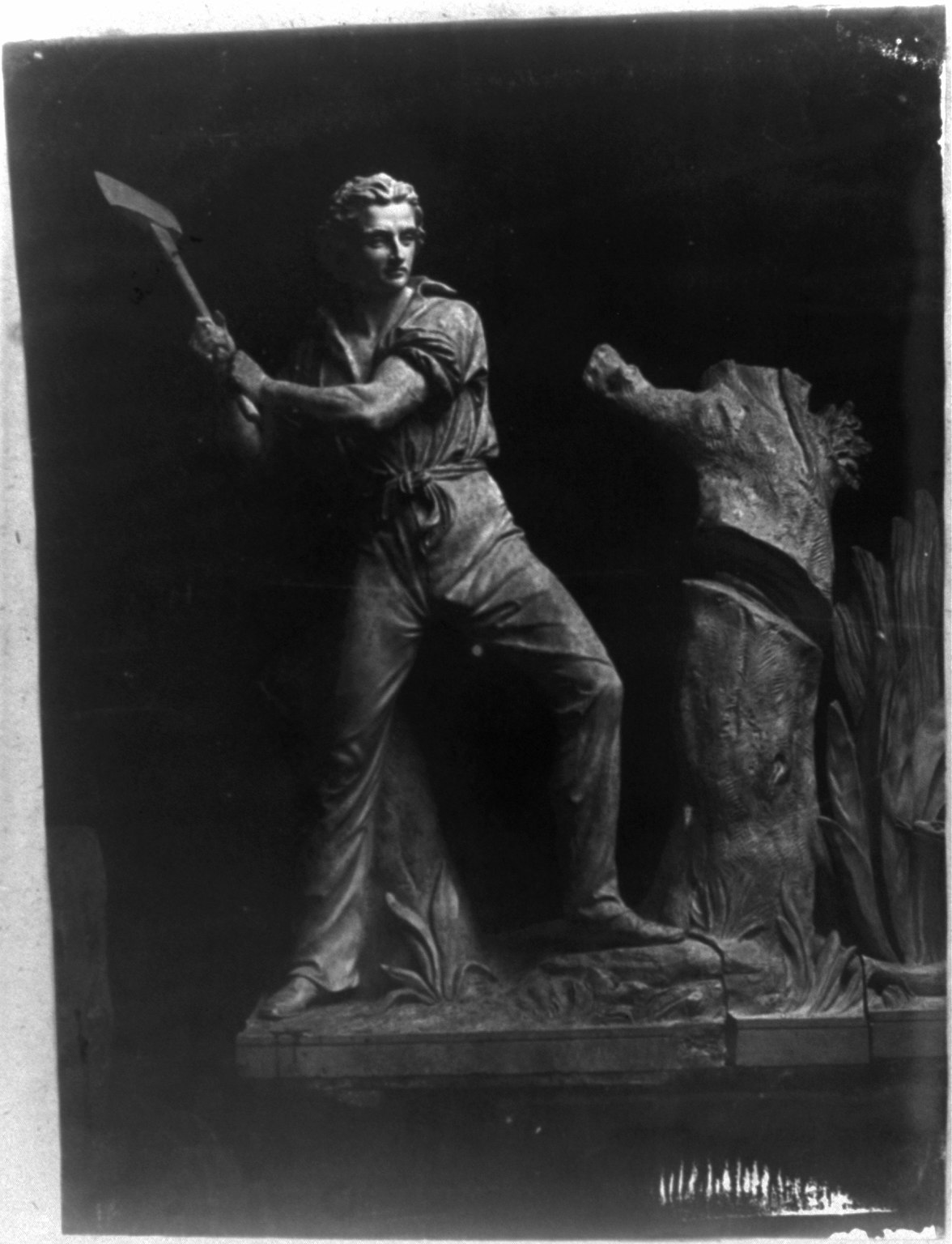
Backwoodsman

To the right of America is a portrayal of a backwoodsman. He holds an ax and cuts down a tree. During the period, the tree stump, ax, and woodcutter were recognized as symbols of the progress of civilization. This symbolism is also present in Andrew Melrose's Westward the Star of Empire Takes Its Way–Near Council Bluffs Iowa and George Inness's Lackawanna Valley.

=== Indian boy ===
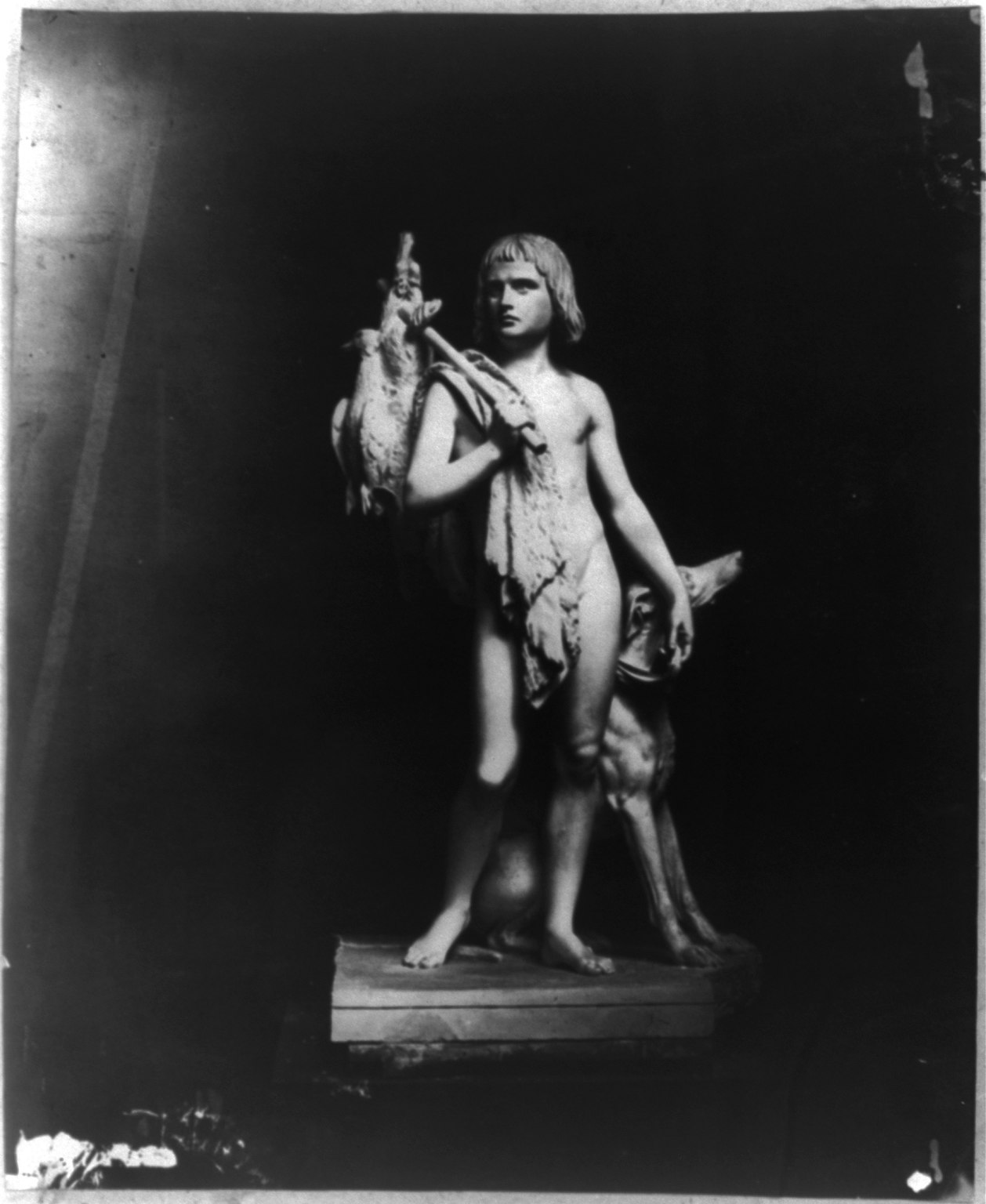
Indian Boy

The next figure, the Indian boy, stands in contrast with the backwoodsman. The boy has just returned from hunting, as indicated by the game hanging over his right soldier. Art historian Vivien Green Fryd observes that some white Americans regarded hunting as uncivilized at the time, making the Indian boy the embodiment of primitive behavior. Fryd further notes that the contrast with the white school children on the other side of the pediment "suggests the uneducated, uncultured, and wild native is symbolically replaced by educated, cultured, and civilized whites."

=== Indian chief ===
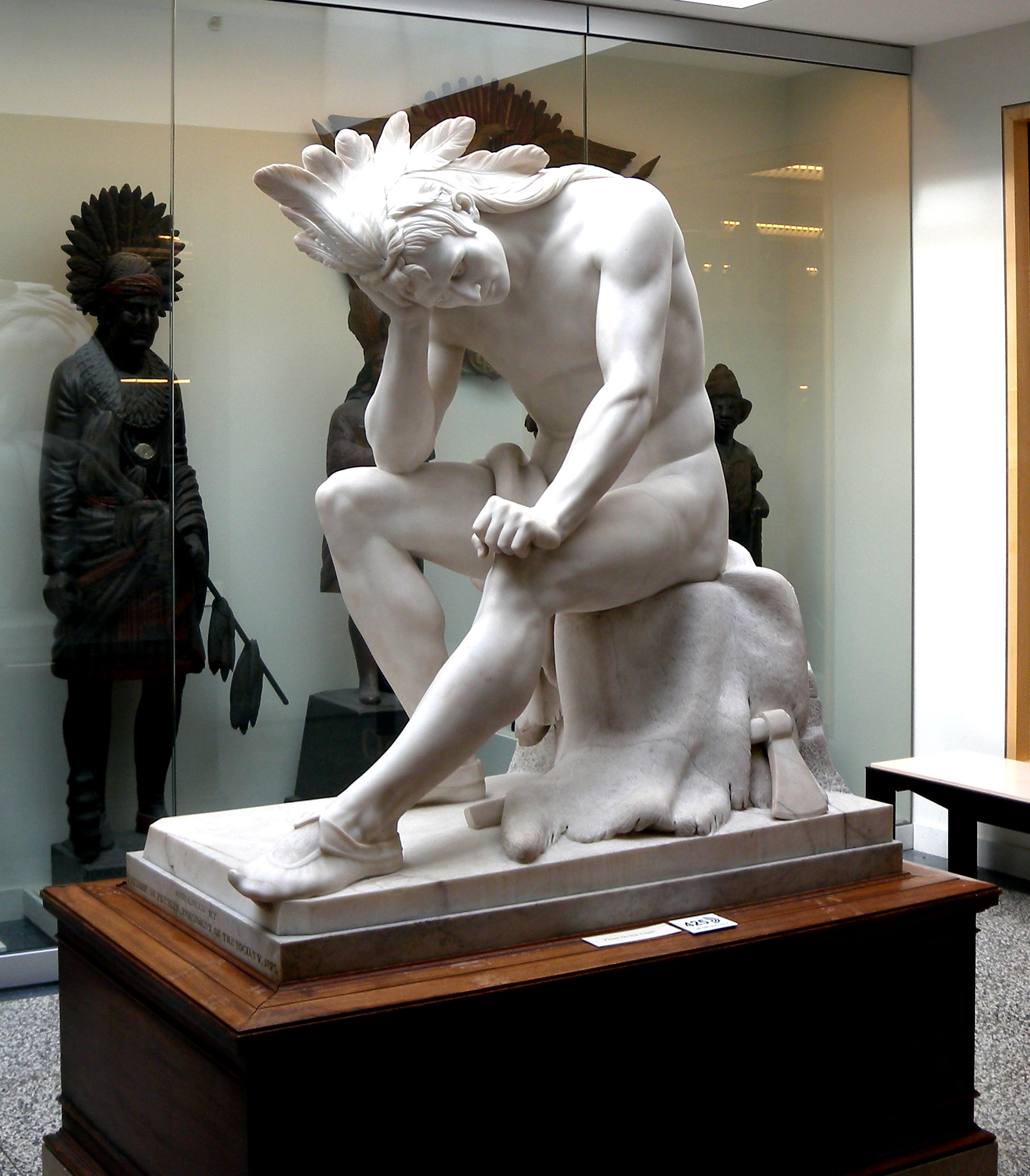
Father/Indian Chief

The rest of the Indian boy's family is to the right, beginning with his father, the Indian chief. The father rests on a rock in a position of melancholy. He wears a feathered headdress and a cloth that covers only his groin. His clenched left fist and bent right leg contrast with his relaxed right side. His ax rests across the rock and is covered by animal skin. Fryd describes this covering as "a sign of the Indian's inability to employ force." In Crawford's words, the Indian chief is meant to "embody all the despair and profound grief resulting from the conviction of the white man's triumph."

=== Indian mother and child ===
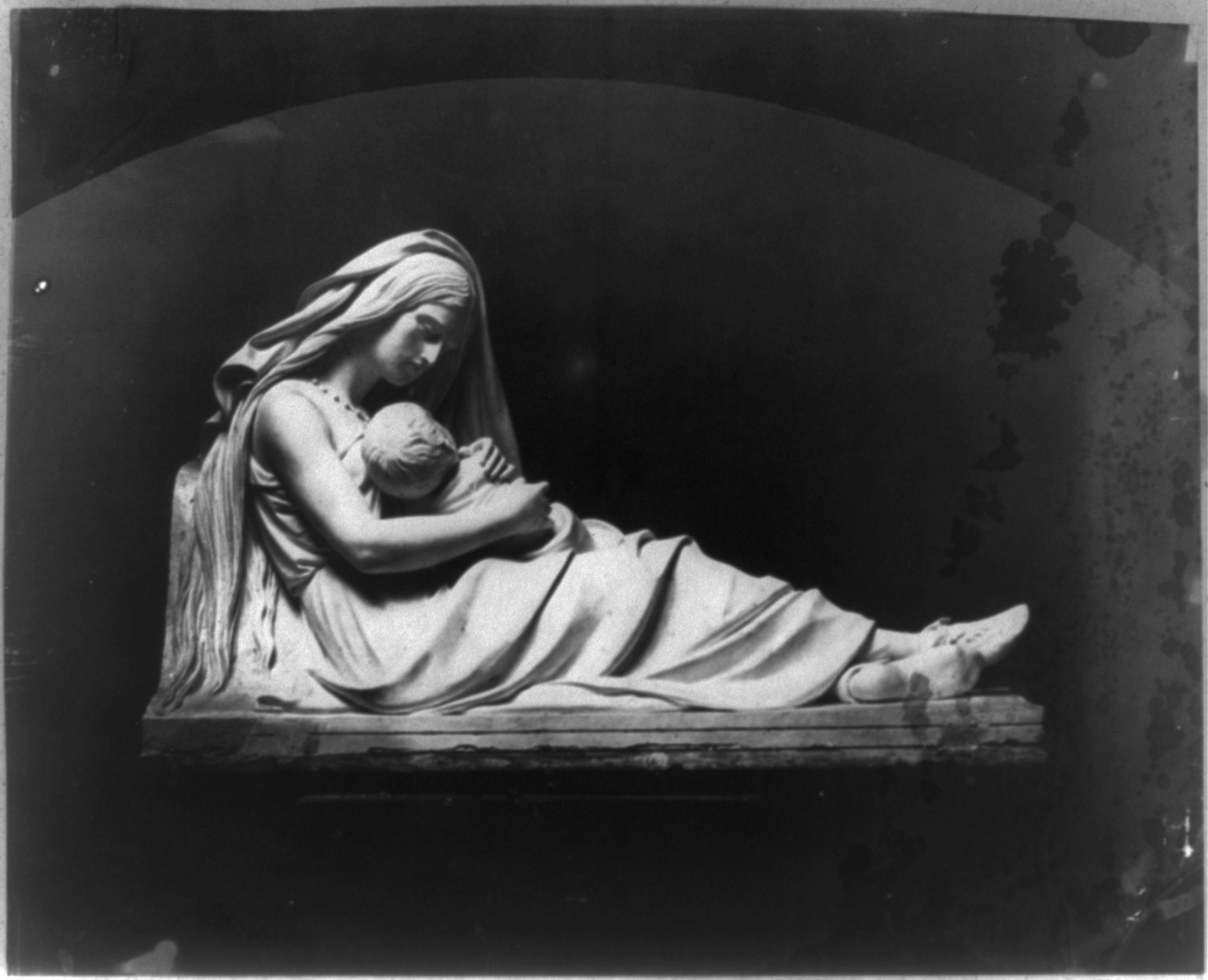
Indian Mother and Child

The final figures on the right side of the pediment are the Indian mother and child reclining next to a grave. These figures follow the mood of melancholy and despair of the Indian chief. An art journal from the time described the figures with the following statement: "The mother, with prophetic fear, grasps her infant to her bosom, she reclines her cheek on its tiny face as though, in her great love, she would shroud it from the inevitable fate awaiting its race, its name, its very land; a fate sadly imaged forth by a heaped-up grave before her."

=== Soldier ===
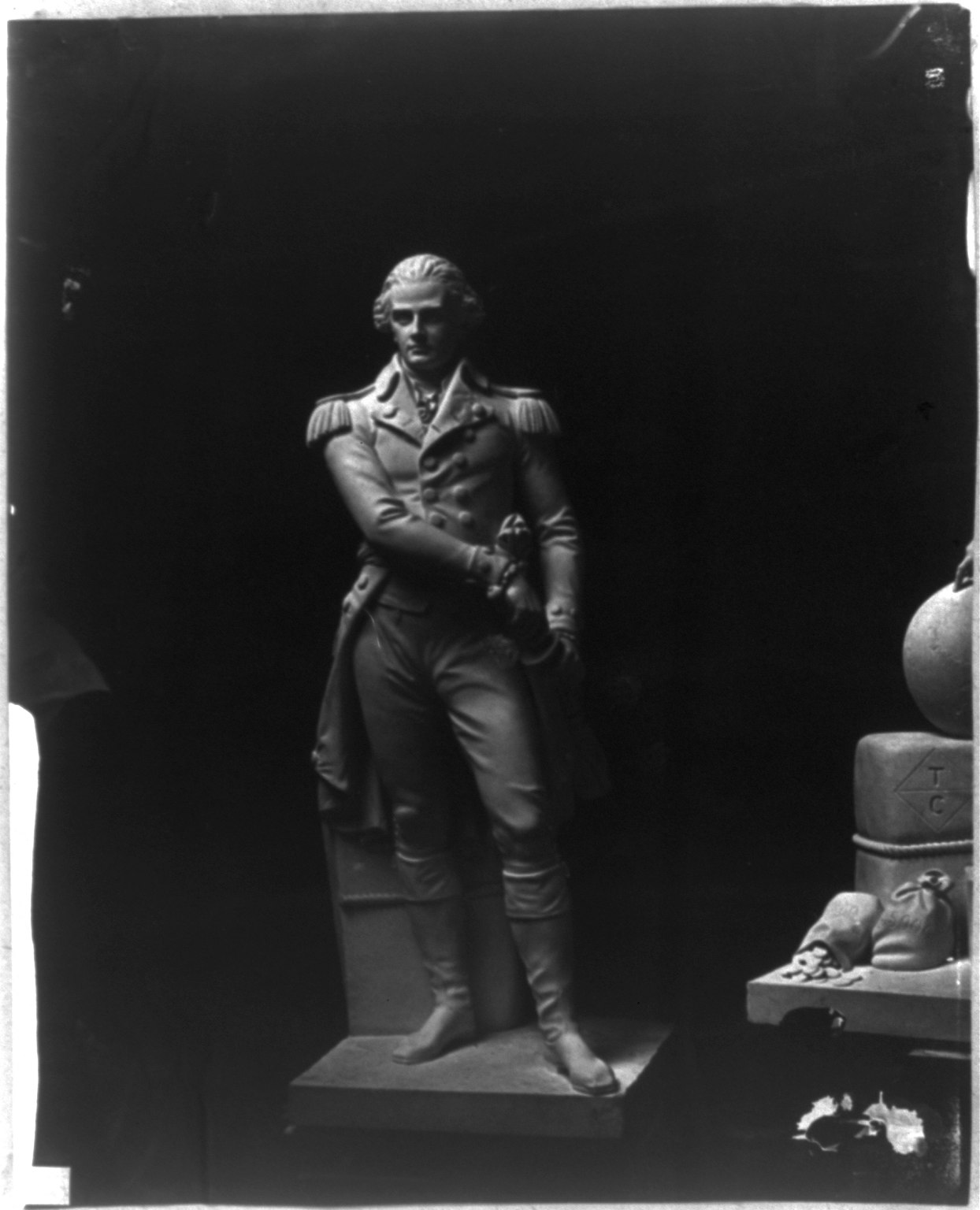
Soldier

The first figure to the left of America is the soldier. He is a reference to the Revolutionary War, the War of 1812, the Mexican War, and the ongoing war against Native American tribes. This symbolism is in line with the rhetoric of President Buchanan and Senator Davis who were prominent proponents of the Mexican War and the war against the tribes.

=== Merchant ===
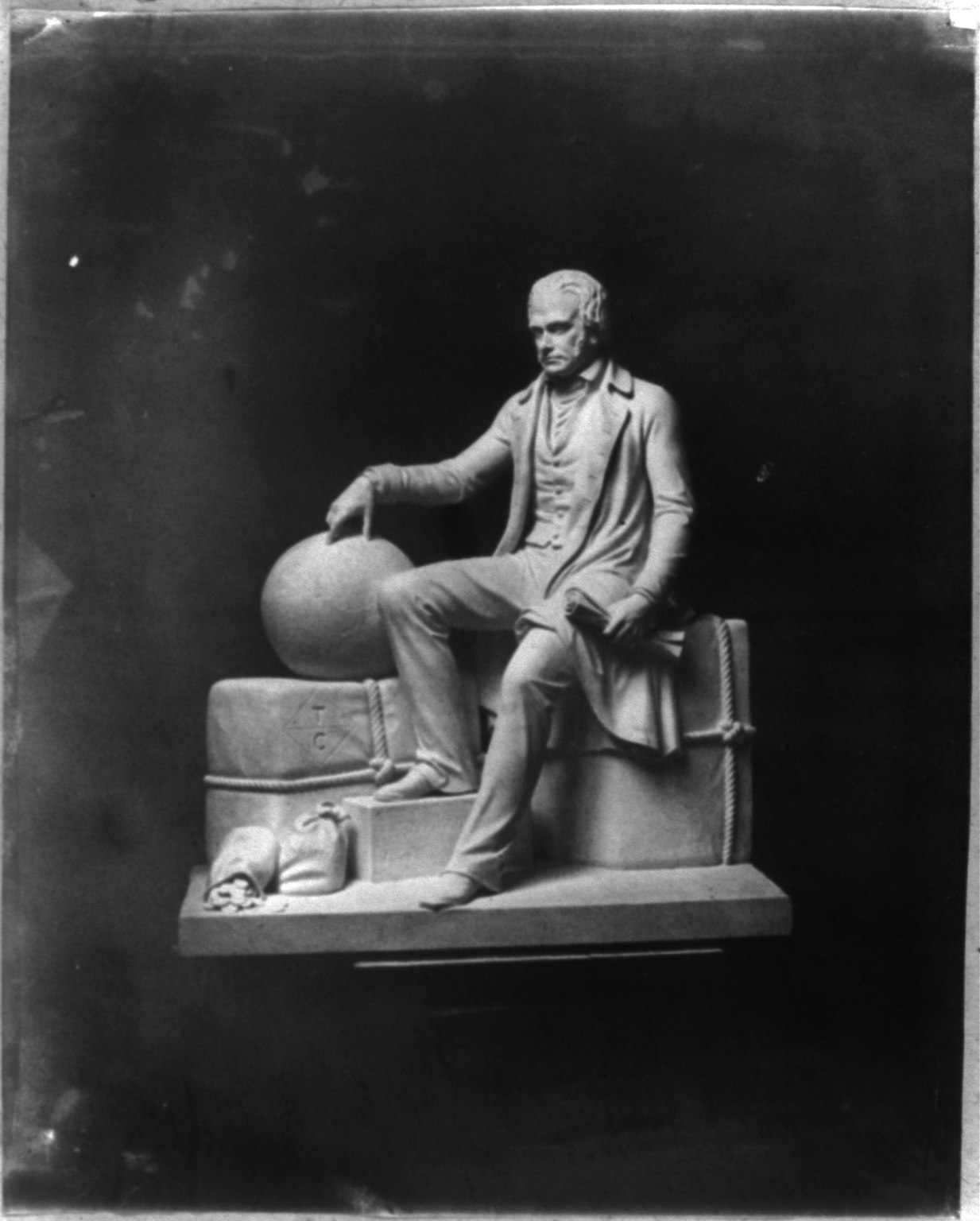
Merchant

Next to the soldier is the merchant. He is seated and surrounded by symbols of commerce. His hand rests on a globe to reference the extensive American trade going on at this time.

=== School boys, schoolteacher, and child ===
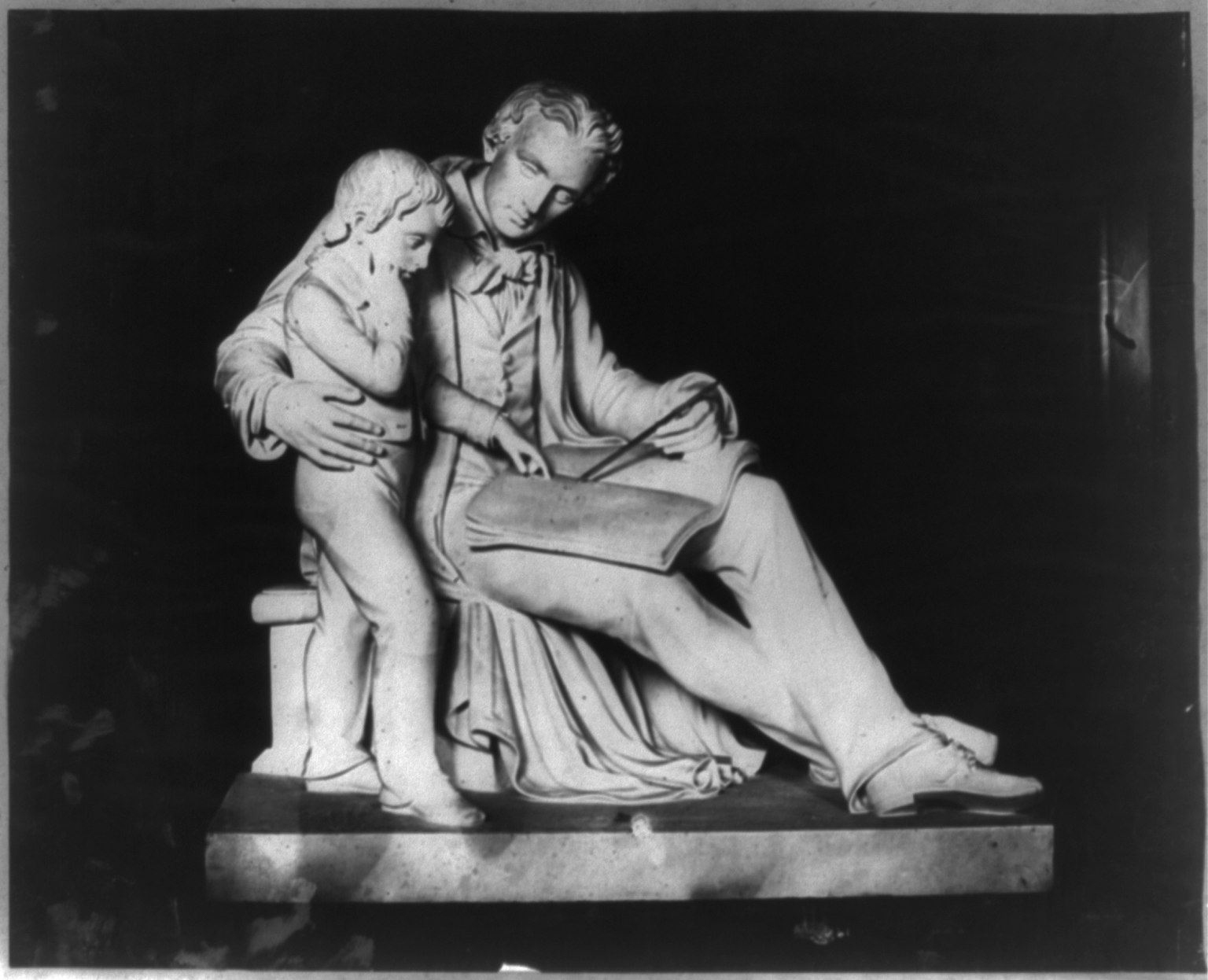
Schoolteacher and Child

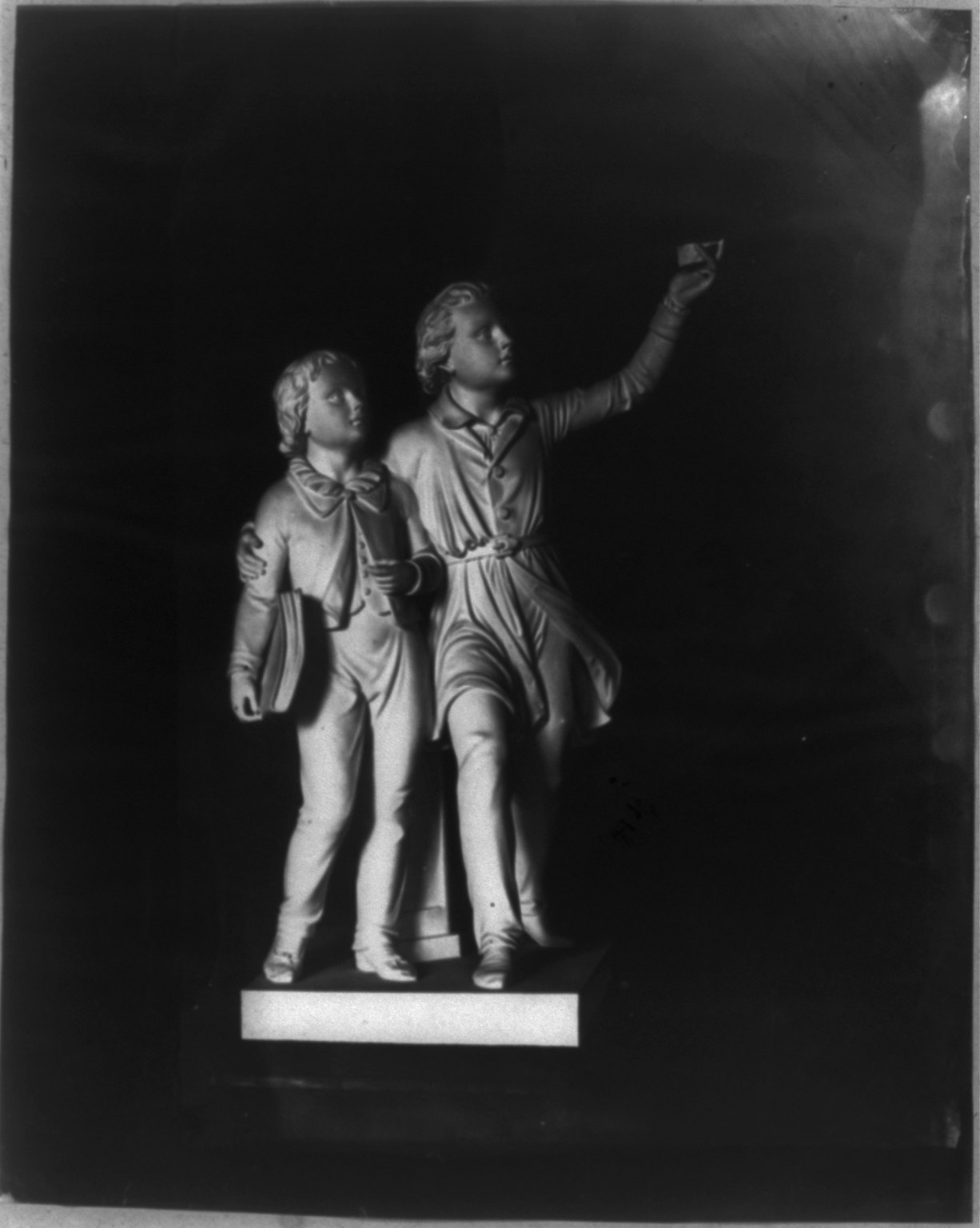
Two School Boys

Following the merchant is a group of schoolchildren and their teacher. Crawford stated that the two boys step forward "to the service of their country" while the schoolteacher instructs the third child.

=== Mechanic ===
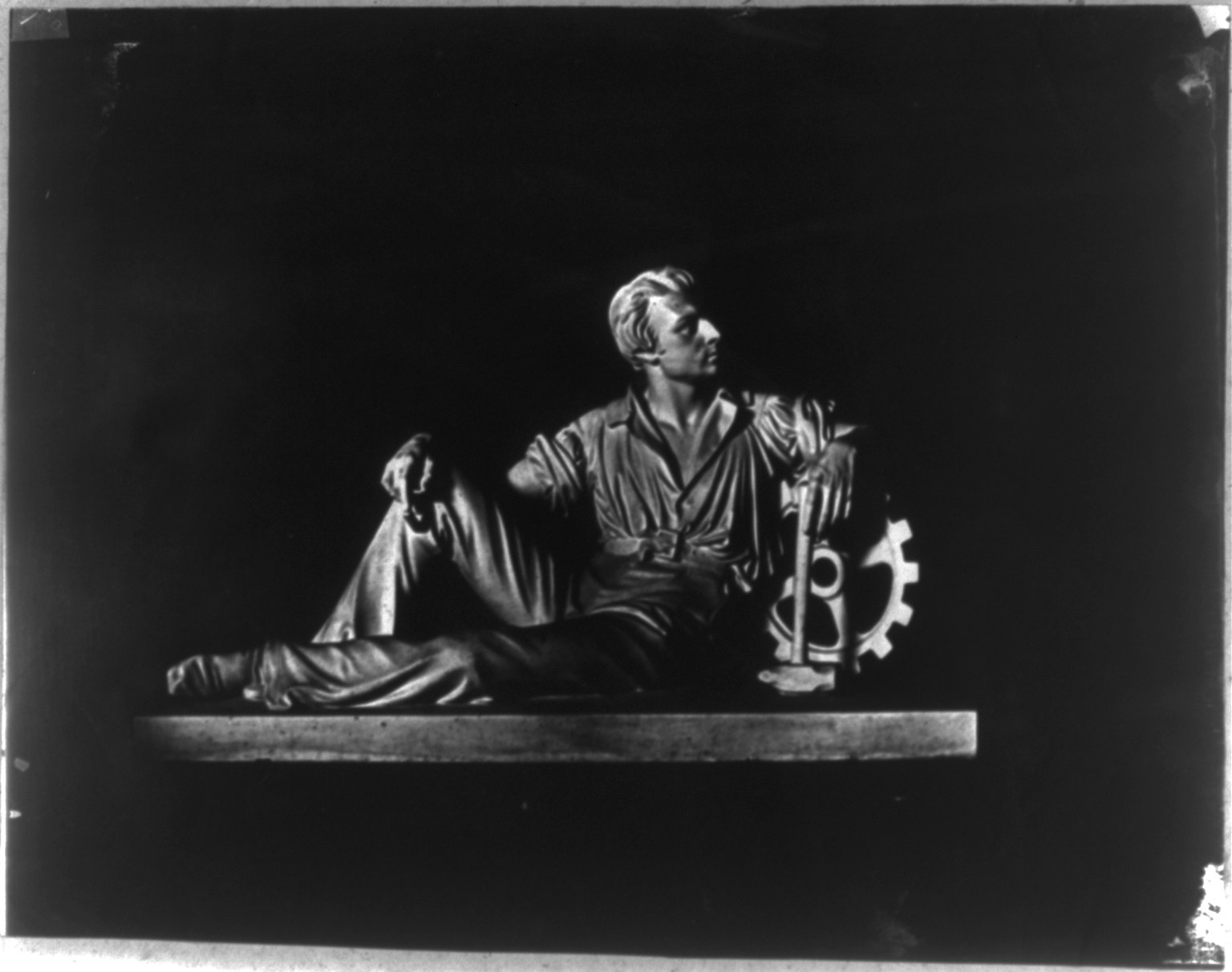
Mechanic

The mechanic is the final figure on the left side of the pediment. He is meant to symbolize industrial and agricultural accomplishments as the means of progress for America. His reclining position and the sheaf of wheat to his side establish a contrast with the Indian mother and child and the grave at their side. Fryd describes the final figures and the objects as representations of "civilization's future and the Indian's necessary destruction."

== Reception ==
=== Early reactions ===
Upon completion, the pediment received praise from critics. The journal The Crayon complimented Crawford and his treatment of the pediment's subjects. The publication also includes an excerpt from the London Art Journal which states, "One can fancy the proud delight with which the arrival of this work will be welcomed in America." Two years later, The Crayon also praised Crawford's portrayal of the Indian Chief figure.

=== Later responses ===
The art historian Vivien Green Fryd argues that the pediment sends the message that "Native Americans must be removed and extirpated, if necessary, for the continued progress of the United States." Other sculptures with similar implications, such as Horatio Greenough's The Rescue, were removed from the U.S. Capitol in the twentieth century because of their depiction of the white displacement of Indigenous Americans. Crawford's pediment has not been subject to the same calls for removal.

== Analysis and Interpretations ==
Art historian Kirsten Pai Buick argues for the importance of analyzing the pediment in relation to its physical context on the Senate building. Further, she says that traditional art history has impeded analysis of the pediment because the Senate is viewed as the 'patron' and Crawford as the 'artist.' Assigning the Senate this role, Buick indicates, removes it from its political function in funding the pediment. Throughout her essay, Buick aims to "reconnect [the Senate] as a governing body to the meaning of the sculpture relative to the Senate's power to advise and consent in treaty making with Native Americans."

Klaus Lubbers argues for seeing the pediment in relation to Indian Peace Medals, which were gifts presented to chiefs during events such as treaty signings to “promote peace and friendship between Indians and their white neighbors.” Symmetry was a typical characteristic of the medals, symbolizing balance between Native Americans and their white counterparts. However, the white figures in these medals eventually were portrayed as crossing over the center and pushing Native Americans towards the edge, which Lubbers says symbolized the displacement and murder of Native Americans. Lubbers suggests that Crawford used symmetry on the pediment to be an element of "stabilization and justification." However, because the figures on either side are not portrayed equally, the symmetry has the effect of minimizing the significance of governmental and settler mistreatment of Native Americans.

== Recent findings ==
In 2016, the US Capitol Building underwent a stone restoration project. This allowed for a closer look at the pediment and extensive photo documentation, which had been previously limited by the height of the pediment. The three-dimensionality of the sculpture was a surprising discovery. Through closer observation, it was revealed that the sides and backs of the sculptures were detailed despite not being visible from the ground.

The other discoveries have to do with the Merchant figure. Scholars involved in the restoration discovered that the Merchant is actually a portrait of James Guthrie who was the Secretary of the Treasury under President Pierce in 1854. Additionally, the figure's index figure on the globe points at Europe, which may be a reference to the Treaty of Kanagawa. Finally, an inscription was found below the figure's right foot. It says "$28,000,000." This inscription was initially a mystery, but scholars discovered that it refers to the Treasury surplus in 1853.
