= Sullivan's Raid =

Sullivan's Raid may refer to:

- Battle of Staten Island (1777)
- Sullivan Expedition (1779) in western New York state
