= Mexican Girl Dying =

1848 sculpture by Thomas Crawford

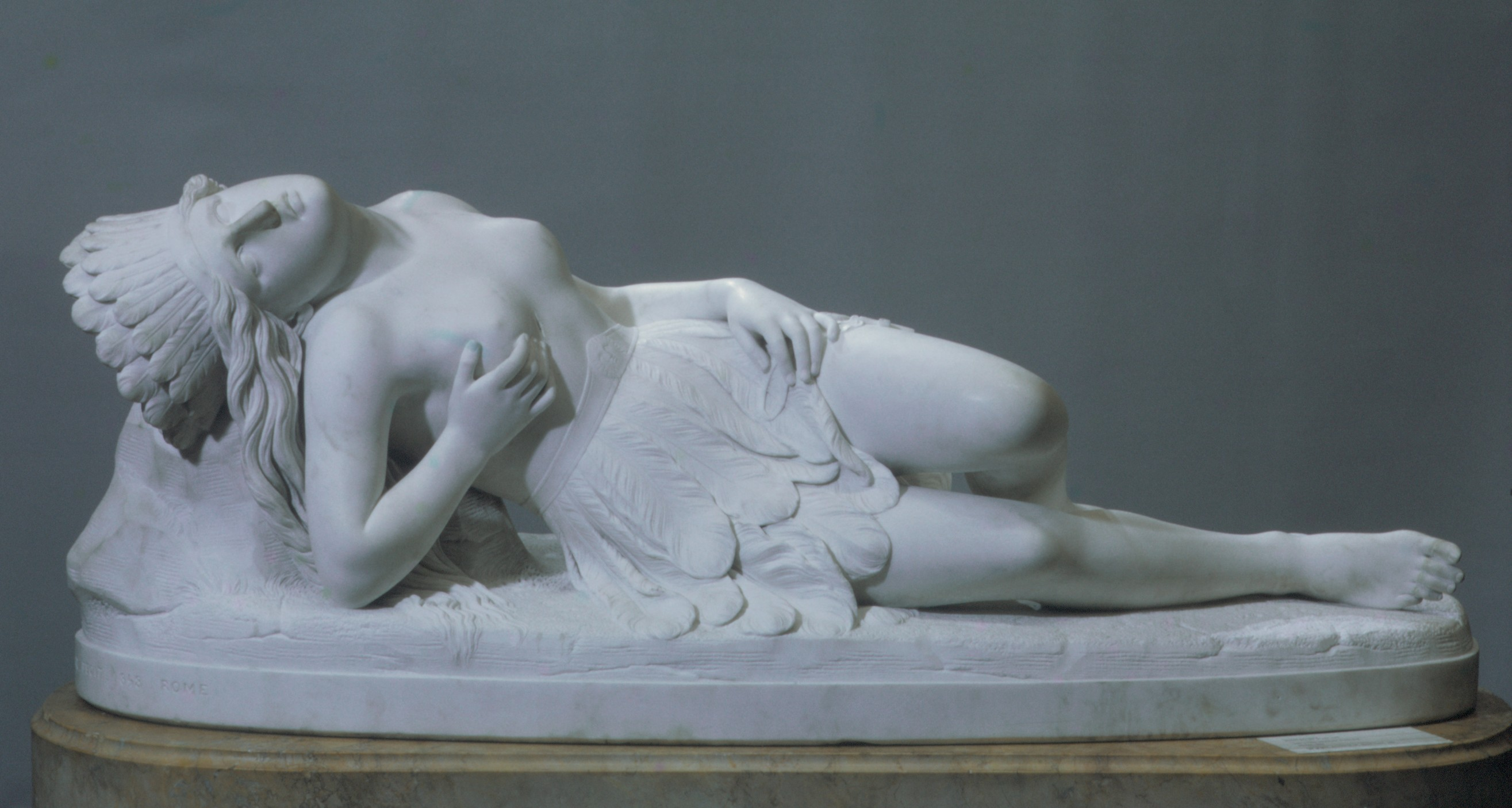
- Artist: Thomas Crawford
- Year: 1848
- Type: Sculpture
- Medium: Marble
- Location: Metropolitan Museum of Art; New York

Mexican Girl Dying is a marble sculpture carved in 1848 by American artist Thomas Crawford. It measures 20.25 inches (51.4 cm) x 54.5 inches (138 cm) x 19.5 inches (50 cm) and is part of the Metropolitan Museum of Art's collection. The woman's identity is not known, but the artist has stated that he drew influence from William H. Prescott 1843 History of the Conquest of Mexico. She bears a wound below her right breast, suggesting that she has been in battle. The cross beside her suggests martyrdom.

== See also ==
- Dying Gaul
