= Revolutionary War Door =

Artwork by Thomas Crawford

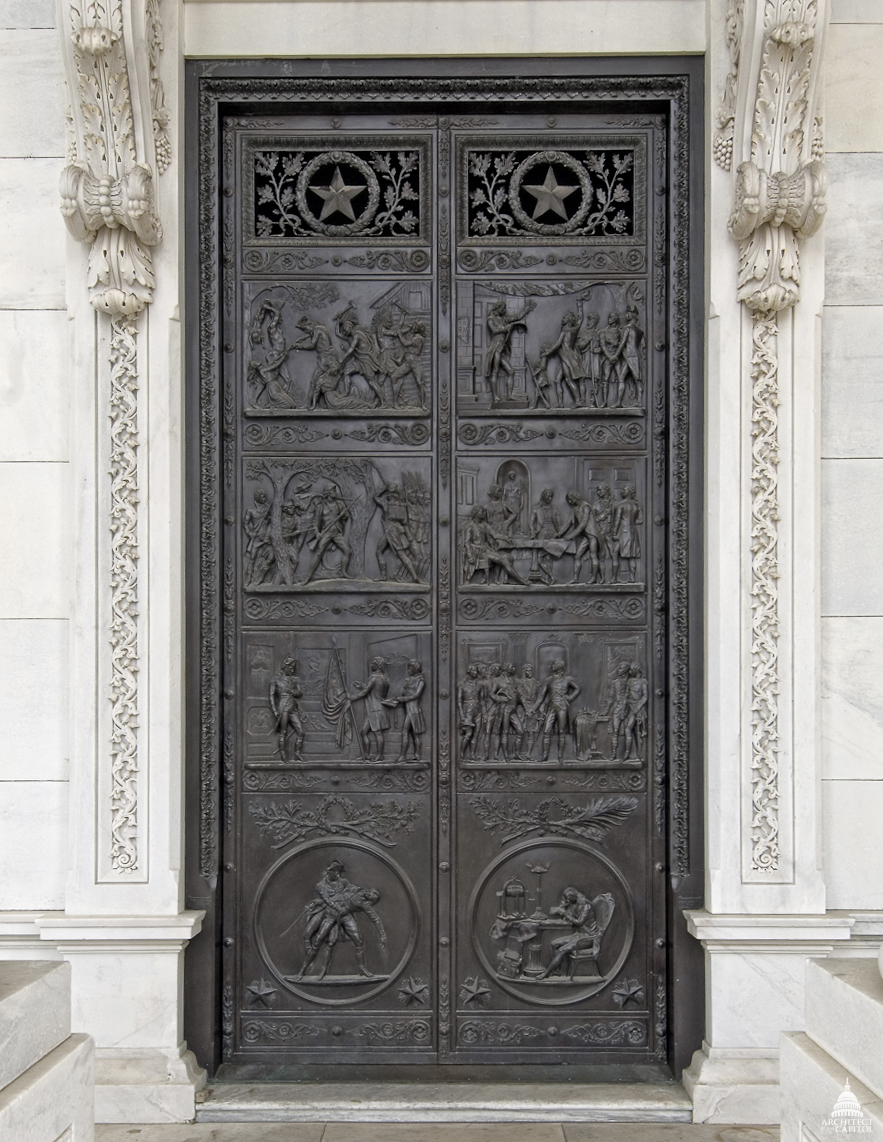
- Artist: Thomas Crawford
- Year: 1905
- Type: Bronze
- Dimensions: 4.39 m (14 ft 5 in)
- Location: Washington, D.C., United States
- Owner: Architect of the Capitol

The Revolutionary War Door is an artwork by American sculptor Thomas Crawford, located on the United States Capitol House of Representatives wing east front in Washington, D.C., United States. This sculptured door was surveyed in 1993 as part of the Smithsonian's Save Outdoor Sculpture! program.

== Description ==
These two elaborate doors consist of six panel medallions that depict activities and events during the American Revolution.

The left panel, top to bottom, depicts:

- The Battle of Wyoming
- The Battle of Lexington
- The presentation of the flag and medal to Major General Nathanael Greene
- The death of Major General Richard Montgomery

The right panel, top to bottom, depicts:

- The public reading of the United States Declaration of Independence in Philadelphia
- The Peace of Paris
- George Washington's farewell to his officers in New York at Fraunces Tavern
- Benjamin Franklin working in his studio

== History ==
Crawford designed the doors in Rome between 1855 and 1857. Crawford died in 1857, leaving William H. Rinehart to create the models from Crawford's original sketches during the years of 1863–1867. The models were stored in the crypt of the Capitol until they were cast in 1904 and installed in 1905.

Crawford created a companion set of bronze doors for the House wing of the Capitol, the George Washington and the Revolutionary War Door.

In 1993 the door was analyzed by art conservators from the Save Outdoor Sculpture! survey program and was described as well-maintained.

== See also ==
- List of public art in Washington, D.C., Ward 6
