= Mary Crawford Fraser =

American novelist

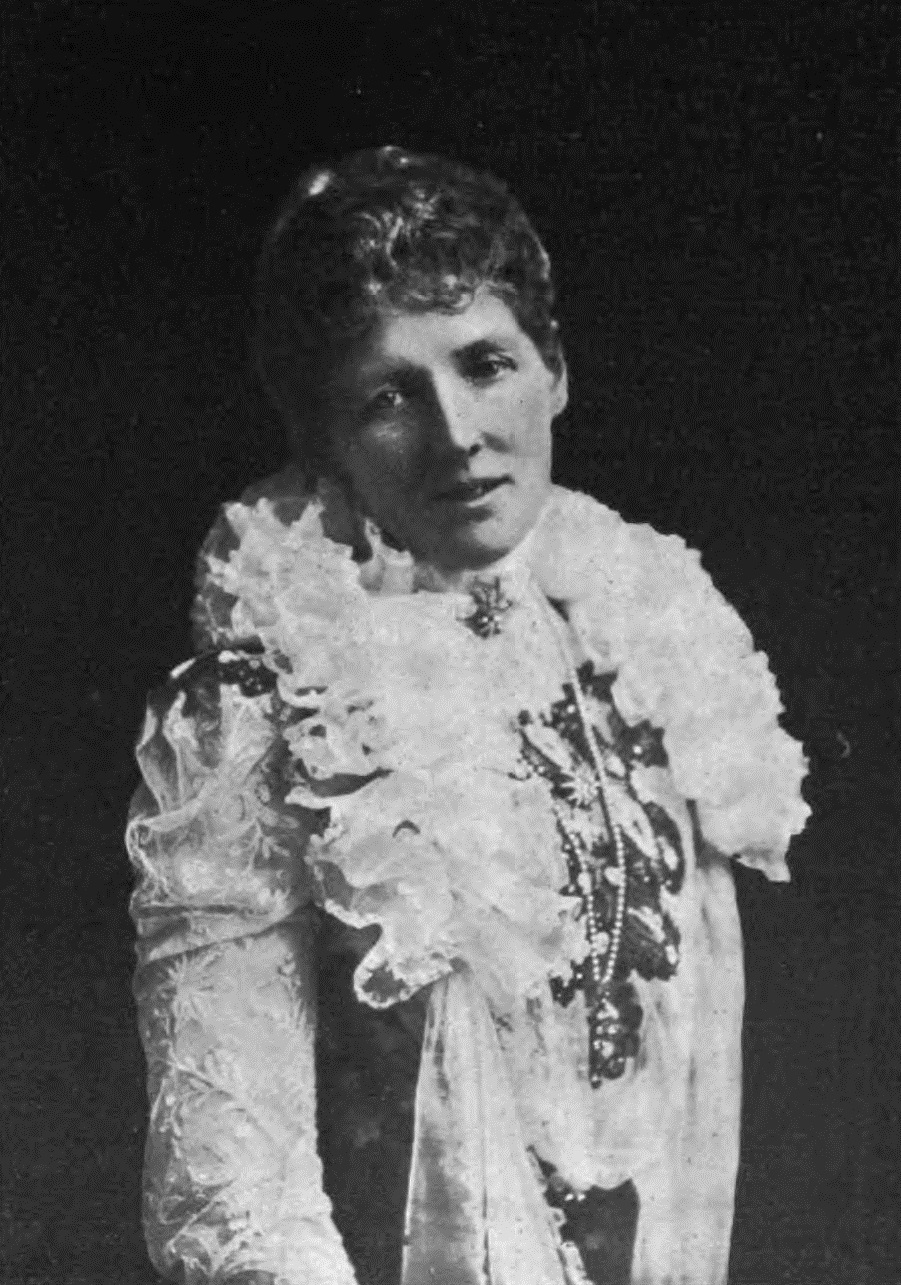
- Born: Mary Crawford; April 8, 1851; Italy
- Died: 1922 (aged 70–71)
- Other name: Mrs. Hugh Fraser
- Occupation: Writer
- Known for: Her various memoirs and historical novels.
- Spouse: Hugh Fraser (m. 1874; died 1894)
- Children: 2
- Parent(s): Thomas Crawford; Louisa Cutler Ward
- Relatives: Francis Marion Crawford (brother); Julia Ward Howe (aunt)

Mary Crawford Fraser (April 8, 1851 – 1922), usually known as Mrs. Hugh Fraser, was a writer noted for her various memoirs and historical novels.

== Early life ==
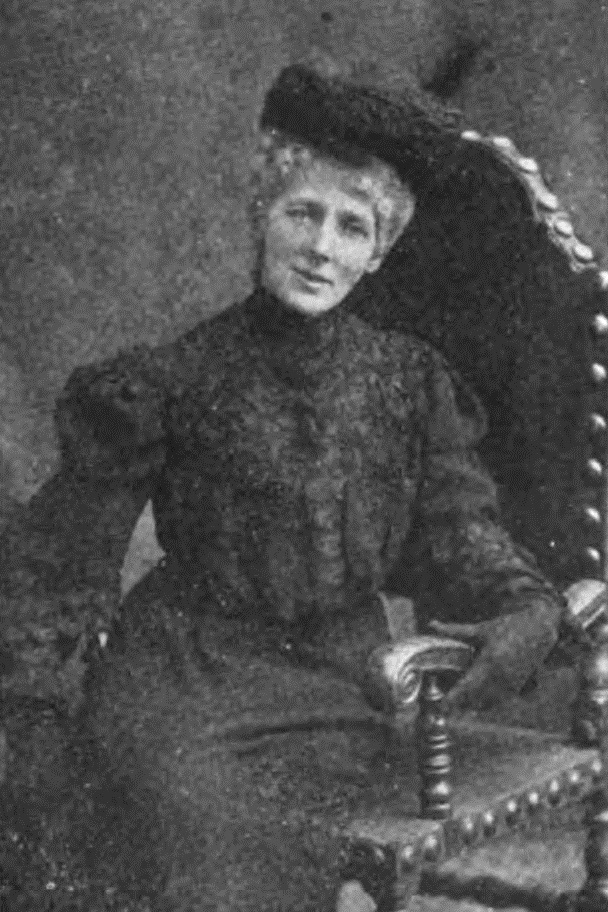

Mary Crawford was born in Italy on April 8, 1851. She was the daughter of American sculptor Thomas Crawford and Louisa Cutler Ward. She was sister to novelist Francis Marion Crawford and the niece of Julia Ward Howe (the American abolitionist, social activist, and poet most famous as the author of "The Battle Hymn of the Republic"). After her father's death in 1857, her mother remarried to Luther Terry, with whom she had Mary's half-sister, Margaret Ward Terry, who later became the wife of Winthrop Astor Chanler.

Her father died when she was young, and she was raised in Italy, as well as in England and New Jersey. She was educated at a girls' boarding school run by the Sewell sisters, famous for their contribution to Victorian educational literature, on the Isle of Wight. The school received a number of pupils whose parents lived or worked in the British colonies and the sisters also took their charges on a number of foreign trips. She credits the school with providing her with many of the skills necessary to be successful as a diplomat's wife, including proper correspondence and social graces.

== Career ==
As the wife of British diplomat, she followed her husband to his postings in Peking, Vienna, Rome, Santiago, and Tokyo. In Rome in 1884, over the opposition of her mother, she converted to Catholicism.

In 1889, her husband Hugh Fraser was posted to Japan as "Minister Plenipotentiary and Envoy Extraordinary (head of the British Legation) to Japan—a diplomatic ranking just below that of full Ambassador, before the establishment of full and equal relations between Britain and Japan which Fraser was, in fact, negotiating. A month before the signing of the final treaty, her husband died suddenly in 1894, leaving her a widow after twenty years of marriage.

Still under her married name of Mrs. Hugh Fraser, she was the author of Palladia (1896), The Looms of Time (1898), The Stolen Emperor (1904), The Satanist (1912, with J. I. Stahlmann, the pseudonym of one of her sons, John Crawford Fraser) Haining (1971) considered that Fraser's "The Satanist" was one of the stories of the period which set the standards for 1960s occult fiction and is reflected in the stories of August Derleth and Dennis Wheatley.

== Personal life ==
In 1874, she was married to Hugh Fraser, son of Sir John Fraser and Lady Charlotte Fraser. Hugh, through his paternal grandmother, Isabel (née Skinner) Fraser, was a descendant of General Cortlandt Skinner and Stephanus Van Cortlandt. Together, they were the parents of two sons:

- John Fraser (1875–1931)
- Hugh Crawford Fraser (1876–1915), who became a Second lieutenant with the 3rd Battalion, the Royal Fusiliers in 1897.

Mary's husband died in Tokyo in 1894. Mary died twenty-eight years later in 1922.

== Publications ==
- Palladia (1896)
- The Looms of Time (1898)
- A Diplomatist's Wife in Japan - Letters from Home to Home, Vol I - II (1899)
- The custom of the country Tales of New Japan (1899)
- The Splendid Porsena (1899)
- A little grey Sheep (1901)
- Marna's Mutiny (1901)
- The Stolen Emperor (1903)
- Letters from Japan : a record of modern life in the Island empire (1904)
- The Slaking of the sword; tales of the Far East (1904)
- A maid of Japan(1905)
- The Heart of a Geisha (1908)
- The Golden Rose (1912)
- The Queen's Peril (1912)
- Italian Yesterdays, vol. 1 and vol. 2 (1913)
- The Honor of the House (1913)
- Seven years on the Pacific slope (1914)
- More Italian Yesterdays (1915)
- Her Italian Marriage (1915)
