= Anne Crawford, Baroness von Rabé =

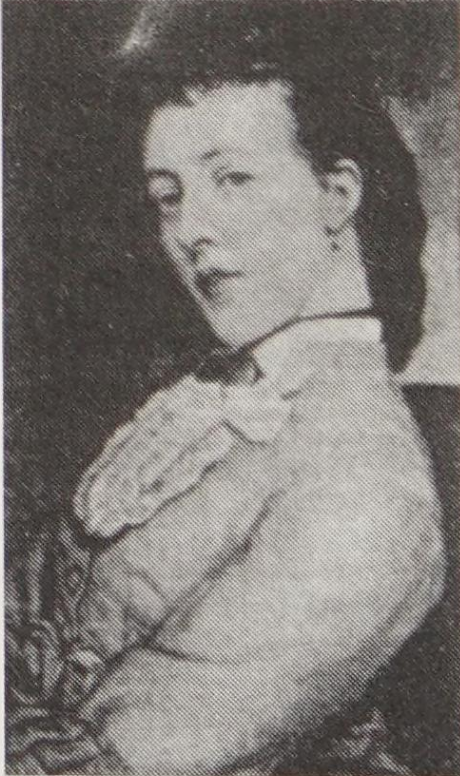
- Born: January 11, 1846; Rome
- Died: December 18, 1912 (aged 66); Rome
- Occupation: Novelist
- Style: vampire literature
- Parent(s): Thomas Crawford; Louisa Ward Crawford Terry
- Relatives: Francis Marion Crawford, Mary Crawford Fraser

Anne Crawford, Baroness von Rabé (January 11, 1846 – December 18, 1912) was an Italian-born writer and painter. She is known for her early vampire story, "A Mystery of the Campagna," published under the name Von Degen.

Anne Crawford was born on January 11, 1846 in Rome, the eldest child of American parents, sculptor Thomas Crawford and Louisa Ward, daughter of banker Samuel Ward. Louisa Ward's sister was American abolitionist and poet Julia Ward Howe. Anne Crawford's siblings were novelists F. Marion Crawford and Mary Crawford Fraser. Her father died in 1857 and Louisa Ward Crawford married painter Luther Terry, to Anne's disapproval. Her stepsister Margaret Terry Chanler recalled Anne Crawford as a temperamental woman who squandered her extensive artistic talents.

In 1874, she married a Prussian military officer, the Baron Erich von Rabé. With his military and feudal outlook and fondness for dueling, he clashed with other members of Anne Crawford's family, especially Julia Ward Howe. He died in 1883 and she was left homeless and estranged from her Prussian family. Eventually she moved to Rome, where, according to Chandler "she fell more and more into the clutches of a medium, a spiritistic padrona with whom she lived and by whom she was exploited." Anne Crawford died on 18 December 1912 in Rome.

Crawford used the pen name Von Degen due to the insistence of her Prussian family that she not user her real name. She only published two long stories, "A Mystery of the Campagna" and "A Shadow on a Wave", published together in book form in 1891. Her vampire story, "A Mystery of the Campagna" was originally published in T. Fisher Unwin's 1887 Christmas Annual, The Witching Time, and features Vespertilla, a female vampire born in the Roman Empire.

== Bibliography ==
- A Mystery of the Campagna, and A Shadow on a Wave. 1 vol. London: T. Fisher Unwin, 1891.
