= James Randolph Reid =

American politician (1750–1789)

James Randolph Reid (August 11, 1750 – January 25, 1789) was an American soldier during the American Revolutionary War. He later served as a delegate for Pennsylvania to the Continental Congress from 1787 until 1789.

== Formative years and the American Revolution ==
Reid was born on August 11, 1750 in Hamilton Township in what was then York County, Pennsylvania. He graduated from the College of New Jersey (now Princeton) in 1775 and joined the Continental Army as a lieutenant. He rose to the rank of major, and was second in command of Congress' Own Regiment.

== Post-war life and death ==
After the war, Reid was one of the veterans who received a patent or land grant. He took his land in Middlesex Township of Cumberland County, Pennsylvania after his discharge in 1781. This remained his home for the remainder of his life.

In 1787, the Pennsylvania legislature appointed him as one of its delegates to the Continental Congress; he held this honor for three years until his death in 1789.
