= George Washington and the Revolutionary War Door =

Pair of a bronze sculptured doors to the Senate wing of the United States Capitol

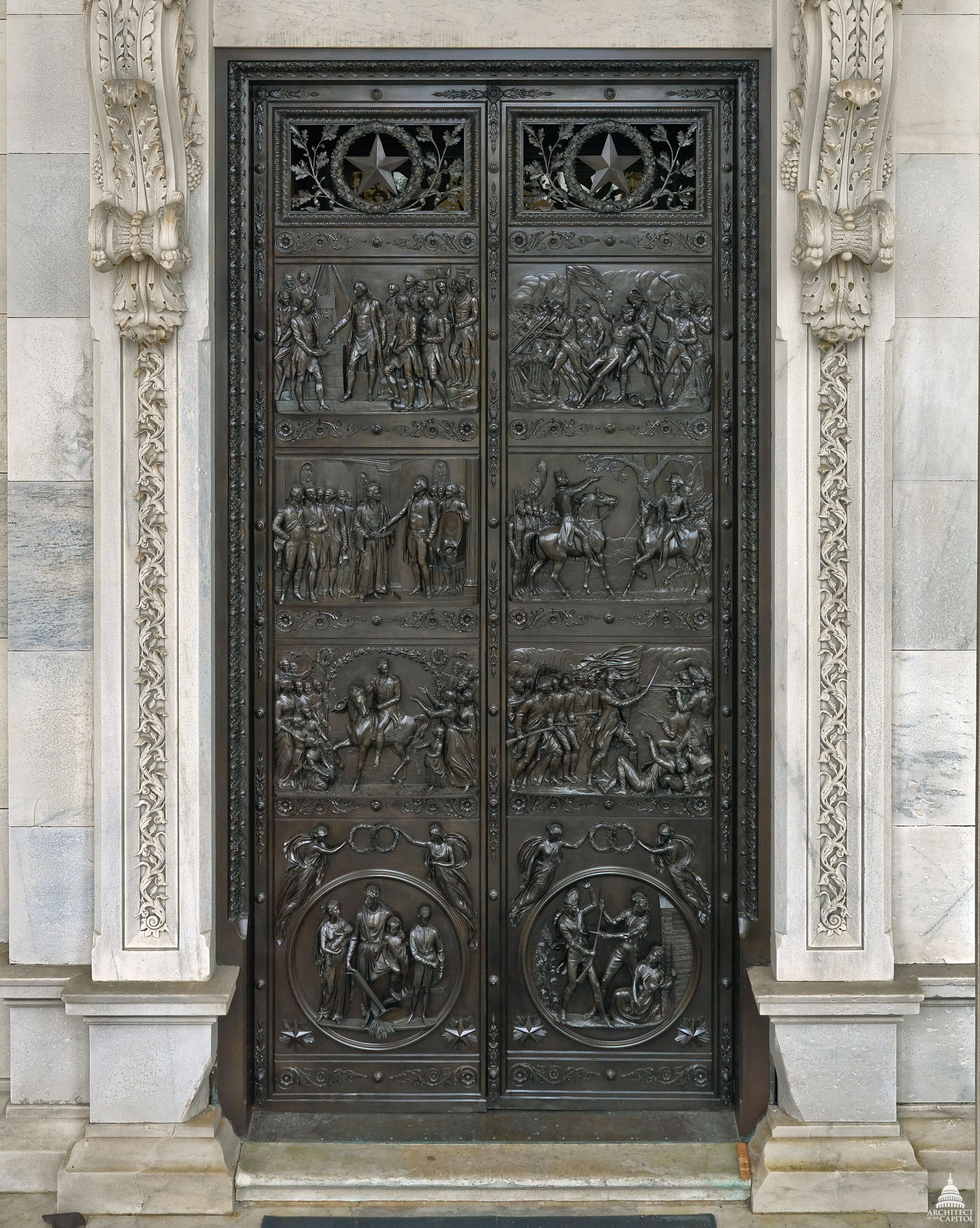
- Sculptured doors in 2011
- Artist: Thomas Crawford
- Year: 1868
- Type: Bronze
- Dimensions: 4.39 m (14 ft 5 in)
- Location: Washington, D.C., United States
- Owner: Architect of the Capitol

The George Washington and the Revolutionary War Door (1855–1868) is pair of a bronze sculptured doors to the Senate wing of the United States Capitol in Washington, D.C., United States. American sculptor Thomas Crawford designed and modeled the doors in the mid-1850s, but died prior to their completion. American sculptor William H. Rinehart completed the doors based on Crawford's designs.

This sculptured door was surveyed in 1993 as part of the Smithsonian's Save Outdoor Sculpture! program.

== Description ==
These two elaborate doors consist of six panels depicting activities and events associated with George Washington during the American Revolution.

The carved panels on the left, from top to bottom, depict:

- the laying of the United States Capitol cornerstone, 1793
- First inauguration of George Washington as President, 1789
- ovation for George Washington at Trenton, New Jersey, 1789
- an allegorical Peace and Agriculture

On the right side, from top to bottom, they depict:

- the Battle of Bunker Hill and death of General Joseph Warren, 1775
- Battle of Monmouth, 1778
- the Battle of Yorktown
- and an allegory of a Hessian soldier and Yankee

== History ==
Crawford designed the doors in Rome between 1855 and 1857. Crawford died in 1857 with the modelling substantially complete. Models were created with the assistance of fellow sculptor William H. Rinehart for casting at the Ames Manufacturing Company from 1864 to 1868, when the finished doors were installed.

Crawford created a companion set of bronze doors for the House wing of the Capitol, the Revolutionary War Door.

In 1993 the door was analyzed by art conservators from the Save Outdoor Sculpture! survey program and was described as well-maintained.

== See also ==
- List of public art in Washington, D.C., Ward 6
