= Battle of Staten Island =

Part of the American Revolutionary War

Coordinates: 40°34′34.61″N 74°8′41.42″W

- Part of the American Revolutionary War
- Battle of Staten Island
| Date | August 22, 1777; a Friday |
| Location | Staten Island, New York |
| Result | British victory |

Belligerents
| United States; 2nd Canadian Regiment | Great Britain; Loyalists; Waldeck; Ansbach |

Commanders and leaders
| (United States) John Sullivan | (Kingdom of Great Britain) John Campbell (Kingdom of Great Britain) Cortlandt Skinner |

Strength
| 1,000 regulars | 900 regulars 400 provincial militia |

Casualties and losses
| 10 killed 20 wounded 150–259 captured | 5 killed 7 wounded 84 missing |

The Battle of Staten Island was a failed raid by Continental Army troops under Major General John Sullivan against British forces on Staten Island on August 22, 1777, during the American Revolutionary War. After British Lieutenant General William Howe sailed with most of his army from New York City in July, Sullivan recognized that the British position on Staten Island was vulnerable, and planned an attack. He carried it out in spite of commanding general George Washington's request that Sullivan reinforce the main army with his troops as soon as possible to support Washington's planned Colonial assault on British-held Philadelphia.

Among its flaws the raid suffered from a shortage of boats to effect its retreat, costing it two companies, and one of its detachments was misled by its guide to the front of the British position rather than its rear. As a result, American losses of dead, wounded, and captured were each double or more those of the British, depriving Washington of some 180-300 men needed for his campaign. Although Sullivan was accused of mismanaging the raid, a generous court martial held later in 1777 exonerated him of all charges.

== Background ==
In March 1776 the British forces of General William Howe withdrew from Boston after Major General George Washington fortified high ground threatening the city and its harbor. With this army augmented by reinforcements from Europe, General Howe captured New York City, forcing Washington to retreat all the way across New Jersey. At the end of 1776, Washington crossed the Delaware River and surprised German troops at Trenton, New Jersey, and eventually regained control of most of the state. The two armies then settled into winter quarters, although there was much skirmishing before the 1777 campaign got underway.

On July 23, 1777, following months of preparation and some preliminary maneuvers in New Jersey, General Howe and his brother, Admiral Richard Howe, launched a fleet carrying most of the New York-based army south in an effort to capture the American capital, Philadelphia. The army was to land at the upper end of Chesapeake Bay and march north.

General Washington, although he was notified promptly of the fleet's departure, was unaware of its destination. He heard on August 10 that the fleet appeared to be moving south of Philadelphia, possibly heading for Charleston, South Carolina. As a result, he prepared to move north to assist General Horatio Gates defend the Hudson River against Lieutenant General John Burgoyne's march south from Quebec. On August 21 he was alerted that the fleet had been spotted one week earlier at the mouth of Chesapeake Bay. Realizing the danger to Philadelphia, he immediately issued orders to move the entire army south with all speed. His orders to Major General John Sullivan, who commanded the front line defenses in eastern New Jersey, were to rejoin the main army "with all convenient speed".

== Prelude ==
Sullivan, in the meantime, had learned that the departure of Howe's army had left Staten Island vulnerable, and planned and put into execution a raid against British targets there. He had learned that although the bulk of British regulars were near the northern end of the island, about 700 New Jersey Loyalist militia were scattered along the western shore, facing the New Jersey mainland. His plan was to cross two groups onto the island from points in Elizabethtown (present-day Elizabeth, New Jersey), capture prisoners from the isolated militia outposts, and destroy supplies. They would then go to the Old Blazing Star Ferry (between present-day Carteret, New Jersey and Rossville, Staten Island) to return to the mainland.

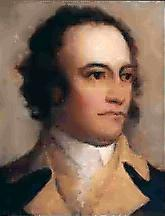
Continental Army Major General John Sullivan

British defenses on the island, under the overall command of Brigadier General John Campbell, consisted of the regular army elements from the 52nd Foot, regiments of so-called "Hessians" from the German states of Waldeck and Ansbach, and the Loyalist New Jersey militia known as Skinner's Brigade under the command of Cortlandt Skinner. Campbell's men (including the German troops) numbered about 900, and were stationed near the northeastern tip of the island. Skinner's men, numbering about 400 according to Campbell's report, were stationed at outposts along the western shore between Dexter's Ferry and Ward's Point.

General Sullivan, at his base in Hanover, New Jersey, ordered his commanders on August 20 to prepare their troops for a march the next day. Sources do not describe the precise composition of the troops chosen, but most of them were drawn from Sullivan's division, which consisted of the First and Second Maryland Brigades. These brigades comprised the regiments of the Maryland Line; additional troops chosen for the operation included companies from the 2nd Canadian Regiment and a company of New Jersey militia. On the afternoon of August 21 two columns numbering about 1,000 in all left the camp. One column was led by Brigadier General William Smallwood, and the other, headed by Sullivan, consisted of troops led by a French officer who had been given a Continental Army brigadier's commission, the Chevalier Philippe Hubert Preudhomme de Borre. After reaching Elizabethtown late that evening, they rested for a few hours, and began crossing early the next morning. One detachment, led by Colonel Matthias Ogden, crossed opposite Fresh Kills and rowed partway up the kill, in order to approach their target, the militia brigade of Elisha Lawrence, from its rear. The remaining troops crossed near Palmer's run on the north side of the island, where they split into three groups. Smallwood and Sullivan led most of their columns away to attack specific targets, each leaving a regiment behind to cover their line of retreat.

== Battle ==
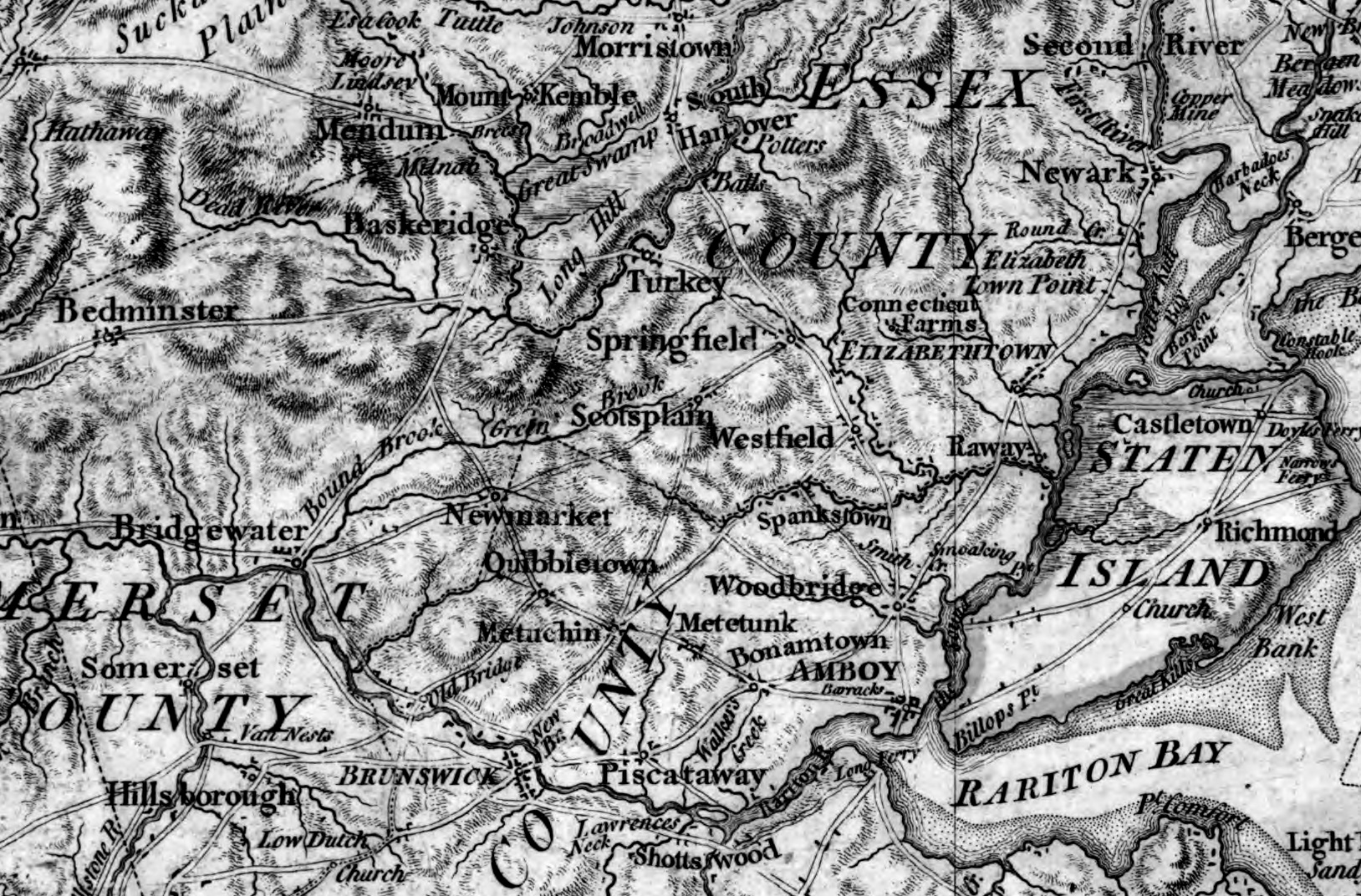
Detail from a 1777 map of northern New Jersey and Staten Island

Ogden attacked Lawrence's outpost at dawn, surprising and routing the militia company. After a few minutes of battle he had taken 80 prisoners, then moved on to the outpost of Lieutenant Colonel Edward Vaughan Dongan, commanding the 3rd battalion of Skinner's Brigade. Dongan's men put up stiff resistance, even though he was felled with a mortal wound. This prompted Ogden to retreat toward the Old Blazing Star. After waiting there as long as he thought prudent, Ogden crossed his men back to the mainland before Sullivan and Smallwood arrived.

Sullivan moved to attack Skinner's 5th battalion, under the command of Lieutenant Colonel Joseph Barton, at the New Blazing Star Ferry, but these troops were alert, and fled when Sullivan's forces advanced on them. Although Sullivan had placed troops to intercept men who tried to get away, many of Barton's men escaped, crossing over to the Jersey shore or hiding in the woods and swamps of the area. Sullivan took 40 prisoners, including Barton. Some of his men advanced on Skinner's headquarters, but the force there was too strong, and the Americans retreated.

General Smallwood's column was led by its guide to the front of the Loyalist battalion of Abraham van Buskirk, instead of its rear. He ordered the attack anyway, and Buskirk's men fled until they were rallied by General Skinner, and the tables were then turned on the Americans. They beat a hasty retreat, although they had time to destroy camp supplies and equipment, and managed to seize a battle standard.

Smallwood and Sullivan joined forces near Richmond, a village in the center of the island, and made their way to the Old Blazing Star. Sullivan sent for the boats to speed the crossing, but they never arrived, so he began crossing the troops and prisoners using the three boats that Ogden had commandeered to cross earlier. As they did this, Skinner and his company approached, accompanied by the forces of Campbell, the 52nd, and the Waldeck and Anspach regiments. Sullivan ordered the companies of Majors Stewart and Tillard to cover the retreat. Numbering roughly 80 men, they successfully held off the accumulated British forces until all other American troops had crossed to the mainland, repulsing several determined attempts to break through their line. Although some of this covering line managed to escape, a number of men were killed, and a sizable number surrendered after they ran out of ammunition and the British began firing grape shot at them.

The British loss was given by the Loyalist publication Gaine's Mercury of September 1, 1777 as 5 killed, 7 wounded and 84 missing. Sir Henry Clinton wrote that the British took 259 prisoners in the engagement, whereas historian Douglas Southall Freeman gives the number of men captured as 150. Twenty-one of the American prisoners were officers, one of whom was wounded; the ranking officer captured was Lieutenant Colonel Edward Antill.

== Aftermath ==
Sullivan's remaining forces marched south after the battle, and were able to join Washington's defensive arrangements south of Philadelphia in time to participate in the key Battle of Brandywine on September 11. General Sullivan was later subjected to a court martial over accusations that he mismanaged the expedition in a variety of ways. A generous court exonerated him of all charges. Today, an area of Staten Island called Historic Richmond Town is in place showing buildings built during the late 1700s that are still standing and represent the hard-fought battle in the Island.
