= Andrew W. Melrose =

American painter

- Born: 1836; Scotland, U.K.
- Died: 1901 (aged 64–65)
- Occupation: Painter

For the British publisher, see Andrew Melrose. Andrew W. Melrose (1836-1901) was a Scottish-born American painter.
