= Thomas Crawford (sculptor) =

American sculptor (1814–1857)

Thomas Gibson Crawford
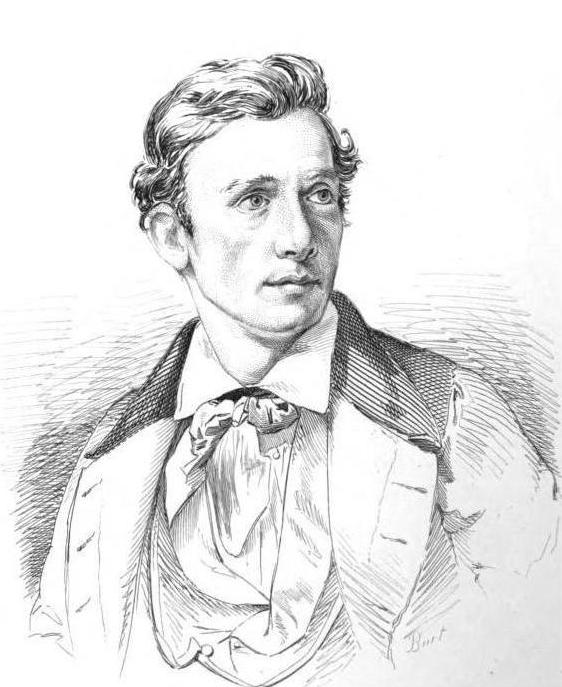
- Thomas Crawford, 1846
- Born: Thomas Gibson Crawford; March 22, 1814; New York City, US
- Died: October 10, 1857 (aged 43); London, England, UK
- Burial place: Green-Wood Cemetery in Brooklyn, New York City, US
- Occupation: Sculptor
- Notable work: Statue of Freedom
- Spouse: Louisa Cutler Ward (m. 1844)
- Children: 4, including Mary and Francis

Thomas Gibson Crawford (March 22, 1814 – October 10, 1857) was an American sculptor who is best known for his numerous artistic contributions to the United States Capitol, including the Statue of Freedom atop its dome.

== Early life ==
Crawford was born in New York City in 1814, of Irish parentage, the son of Aaron and Mary (née Gibson) Crawford. In his early years, he was at school with Page, the artist. His proficiency in his studies was hindered by the exuberance of his fancy, which took form in drawings and carvings. His love of art led him, at the age of 19, to enter the New York City studios of John Frazee and Robert Eberhard Launitz, artists and artificers in marble.

In 1834, he went abroad for the promotion of artistic studies, and in the summer of 1835 took up his residence in Rome, for life as it proved. Launitz had provided Crawford with a letter of introduction to Bertel Thorvaldsen and upon arriving in Rome, Crawford became a pupil of Thorwaldsen. Under his guidance, Crawford devoted himself to the study both of the antique and of living models.

== Career ==
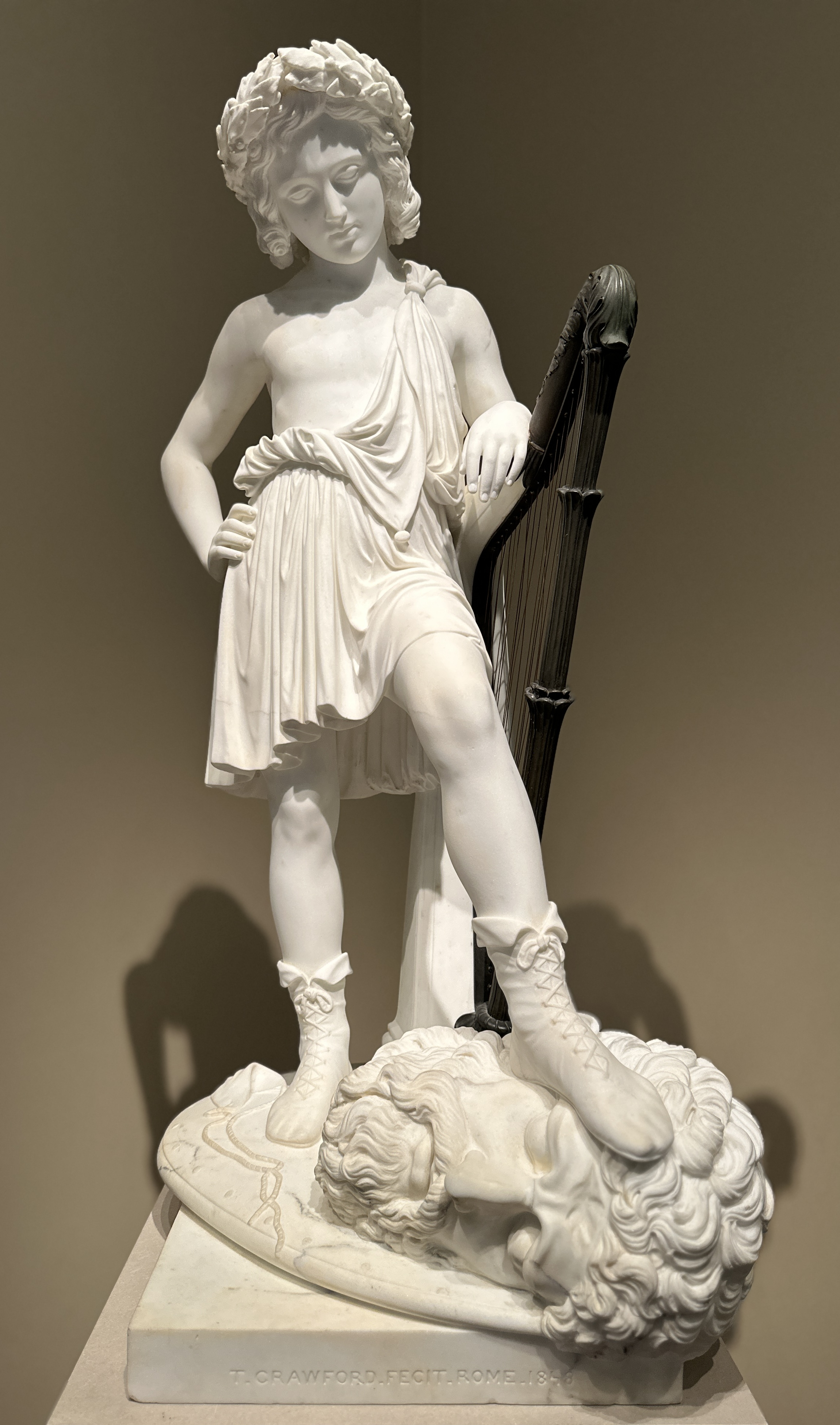
David Triumphant, marble and bronze, 1848, in the National Gallery of Art

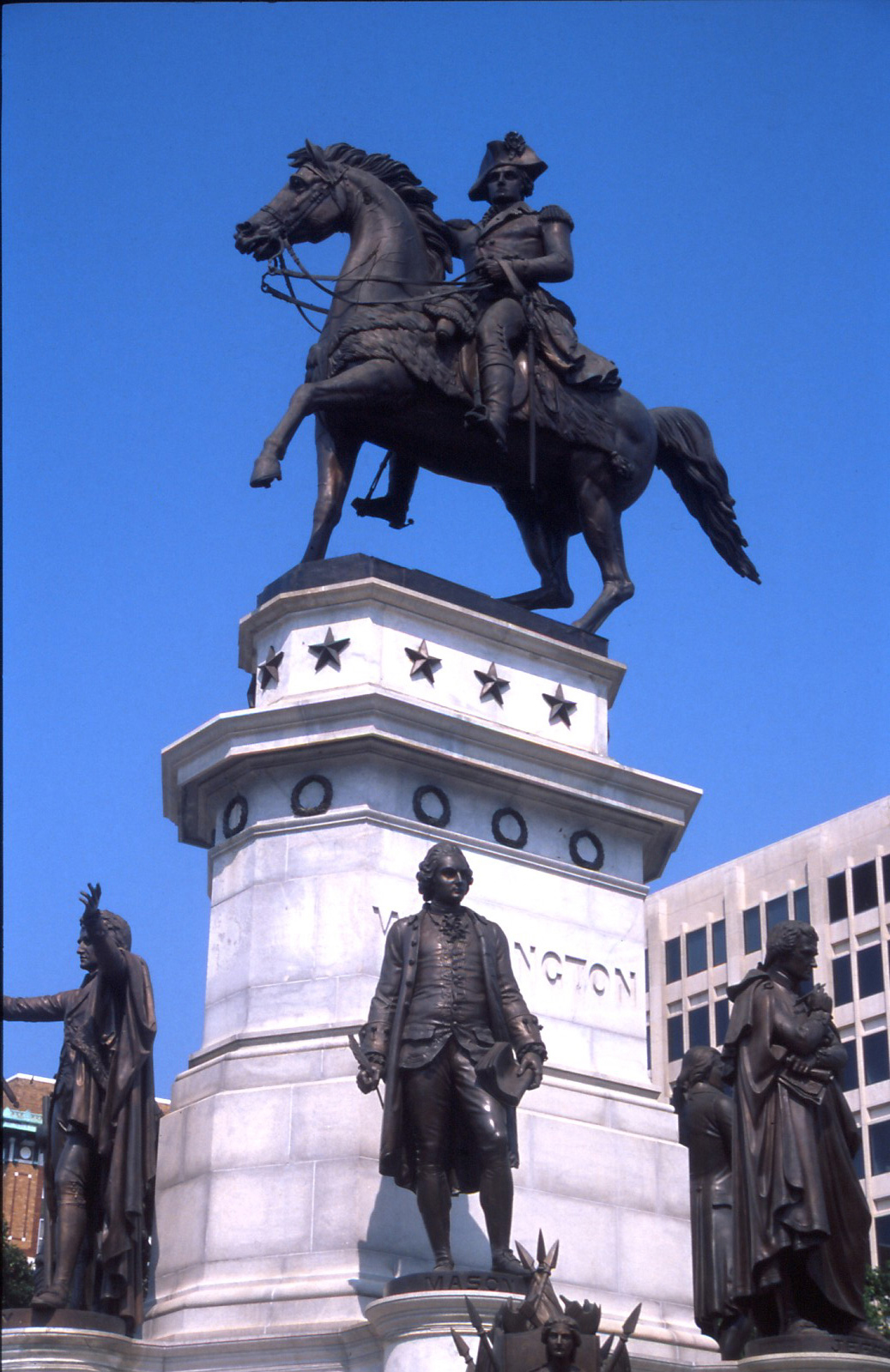
Virginia Washington Monument, Richmond, Virginia

His first ideal work was a group of Orpheus and Cerberus, executed in 1839, and purchased, some years later, for the Boston Athenaeum, and now displayed at the Museum of Fine Arts, Boston. This was followed by a succession of groups, single figures, and bas-reliefs, whose rapid production bore witness to the fertility as well as the versatility of his genius. Among these are Adam and Eve and a bust of Josiah Quincy, in 1900 in the Boston Athenaeum; Hebe and Ganymede, presented to the Boston Museum of Fine Arts by C. C. Perkins, and a bronze statue of Beethoven, presented by the same gentleman to the Boston Music Hall, which now resides at the New England Conservatory; Babes in the Wood, in the Lenox Library; Mercury and Psyche; Flora, now in the gallery of the late Mrs. A. T. Stewart; Mexican Girl Dying; Dancing Jenny, modelled from his own daughter; and a statue of James Otis, which once adorned the chapel at Mount Auburn Cemetery, Cambridge. In 1838, he was elected into the National Academy of Design as an Honorary Academician.

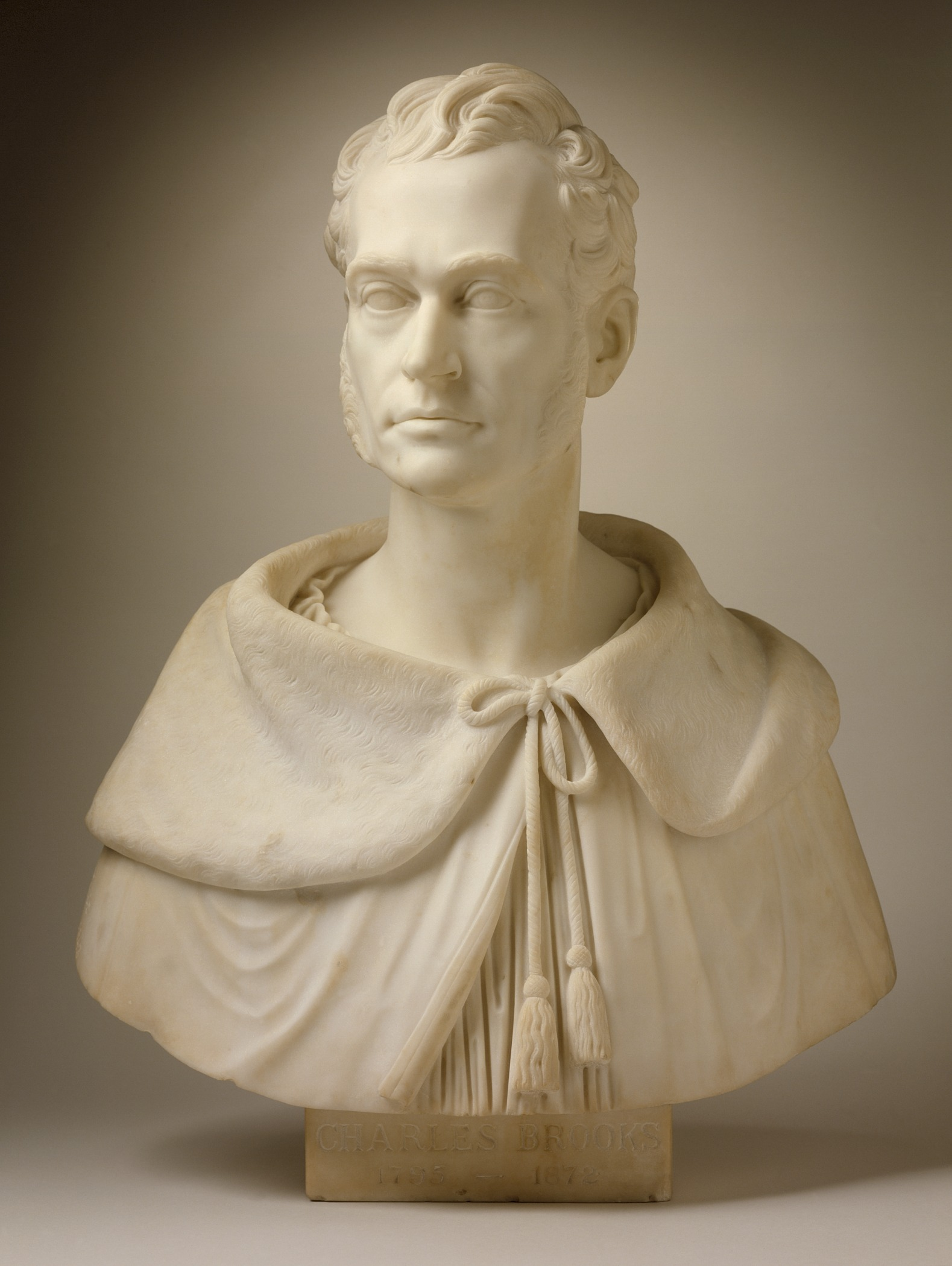
Bust of Charles Brooks (1795-1872), pastor, 1843 Marble

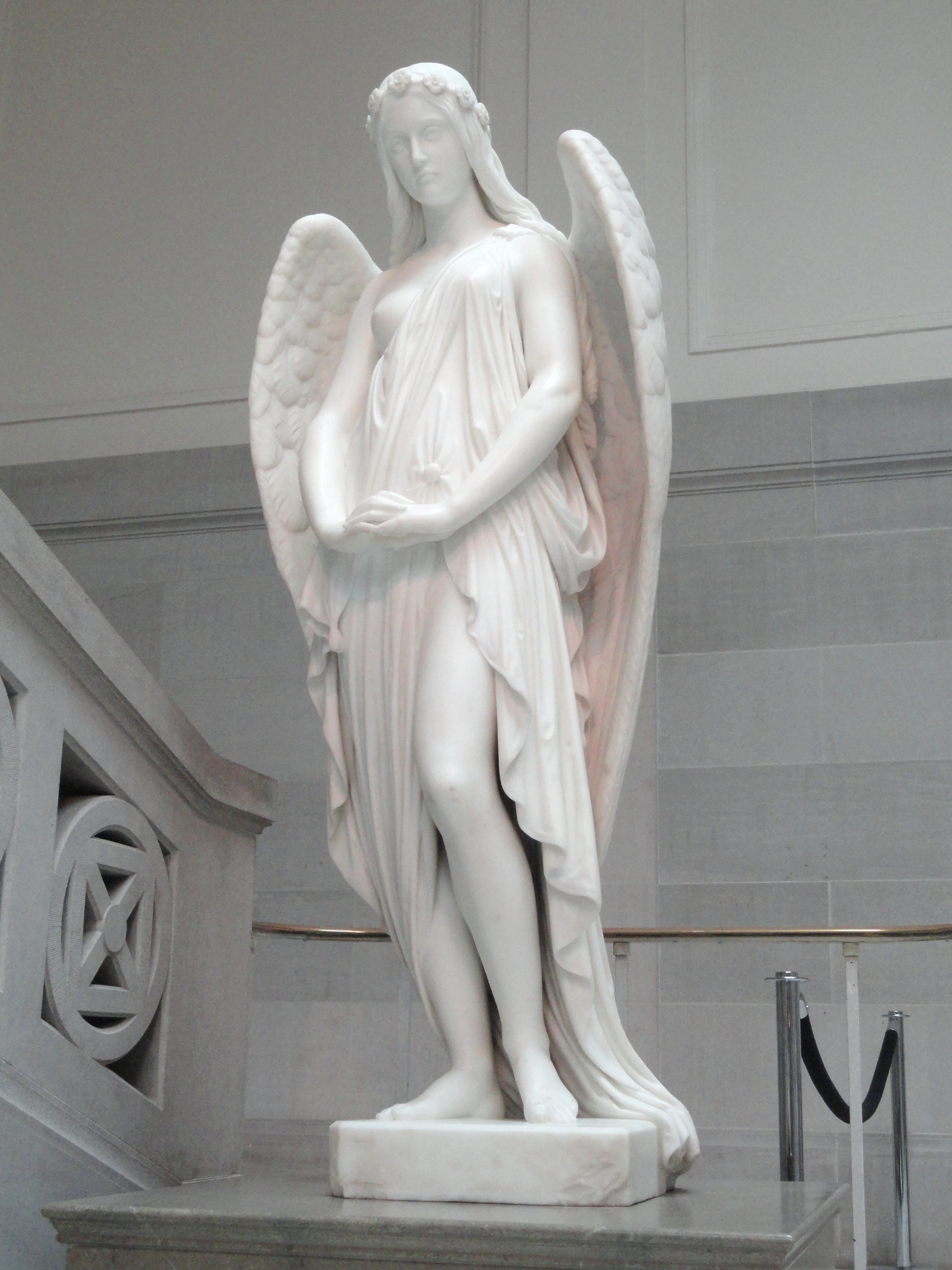
Peri at the Gates of Paradise, by Thomas Crawford, modeled 1854, carved by 1859, Corcoran Gallery of Art

In 1849, while on a visit to this country, he received from the state of Virginia an order for a monument to be erected in Richmond. He immediately returned to Rome and began the work, of which the design was a star of five rays, each one of these bearing a statue of some historic Virginian, Patrick Henry and Thomas Jefferson among the number. The work is surmounted by a plinth, on which stands an equestrian statue of George Washington. These statues, modeled in Rome, were cast at a Munich foundry.

=== U.S. Capitol ===
Crawford's most important works after these were ordered by the federal government for the United States Capitol at Washington. First among these was a marble pediment bearing life-size figures symbolical of the progress of American civilization; next in order came a bronze figure Freedom Triumphant in War and Peace which surmounts the dome; and last of these, and of his life-work, was a bronze door on which are modelled various scenes in the public life of Washington. Prominent among Crawford's works was also his statue of a Native American chief, much admired by the English sculptor Gibson, who proposed that a bronze copy of it should be retained in Rome as a lasting monument.

His major accomplishments include the figure above the dome of the United States Capitol entitled Freedom Triumphant in War and Peace, the Revolutionary War Door in the House wing, and the bronze doors and pediment statues for the Senate wing. He was only able to begin the bas-reliefs for the bronze doors, which were afterwards completed by W. H. Rinehart.

== Personal life ==
In 1844, he married Louisa Cutler Ward, a daughter of Julia (née Cutler) Ward and banker Samuel Ward. Among her siblings was brother Samuel Cutler Ward, who married Emily Astor (daughter of William Backhouse Astor Sr.) and sister Julia Ward, who married Samuel Gridley Howe. Together, Thomas and Louisa were the parents of four children, including:

- Mary Crawford Fraser (1851–1922), a writer who in 1874 married diplomat Hugh Fraser (1837–1894), who served as the United Kingdom's Ambassador to Japan from 1889 to 1894 during the reign of Queen Victoria and Emperor Meiji.
- Francis Marion Crawford (1854–1909), a writer who married Elizabeth Berdan, the daughter of the Union General Hiram Berdan, in 1884.
- Anne Crawford, Baroness von Rabé (1846-1912), writer of an early vampire story, "A Mystery of the Campagna".

In politics he was a liberal, in religion a Protestant, in character generous and kindly, and adverse to discords, professional or social.

Crawford began experiencing significant deterioration in his vision in 1856, which ended his career. He sought medical treatment in Paris, Rome, and London, and physicians discovered cancer of the eye and cancer of the brain. He died in London on October 10, 1857. His body was returned to the United States, and buried in an unmarked grave at Green-Wood Cemetery in Brooklyn, New York.

== Works ==
- Mexican Girl Dying (1848)
- Statue of Freedom (1862)
- Progress of Civilization Pediment (1863)
- George Washington and the Revolutionary War Door (1868)
- Revolutionary War Door (1905)
