= New Jersey Volunteers =

New Jersey Volunteers (Skinner's Greens)
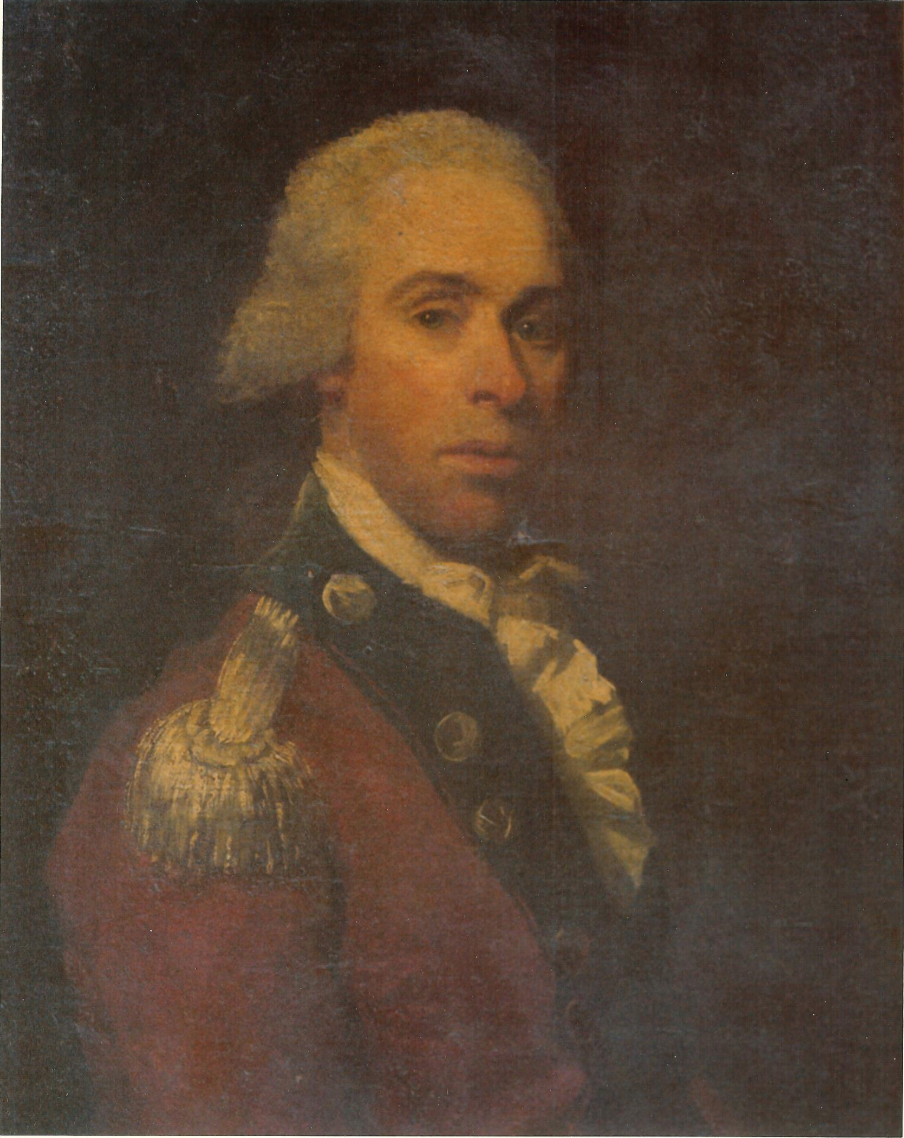
- Portrait of James Moody in the uniform of the New Jersey Volunteers
- Active: 1776-1783
- Country: Great Britain
- Branch: Provincial Corps
- Type: Dragoons and infantry
- Role: Intelligence gathering, special operations, maneuver warfare, guerrilla warfare, cattle raiding
- Size: six battalions (500 each), regiment (1,800)
- Garrison/HQ: New York City, Province of New York
- Nicknames: Jersey Volunteers, Skinner's Corps, Skinner's Greens, Skinners
- Engagements: American Revolutionary War; New York and New Jersey campaign; Battle of Long Island; Battle of Staten Island; Southern theater of the American Revolutionary War; Capture of Savannah; Battle of King's Mountain; Battle of Eutaw Springs; Battle of Groton Heights; Siege of Yorktown

Commanders
- Notable commanders: Cortlandt Skinner

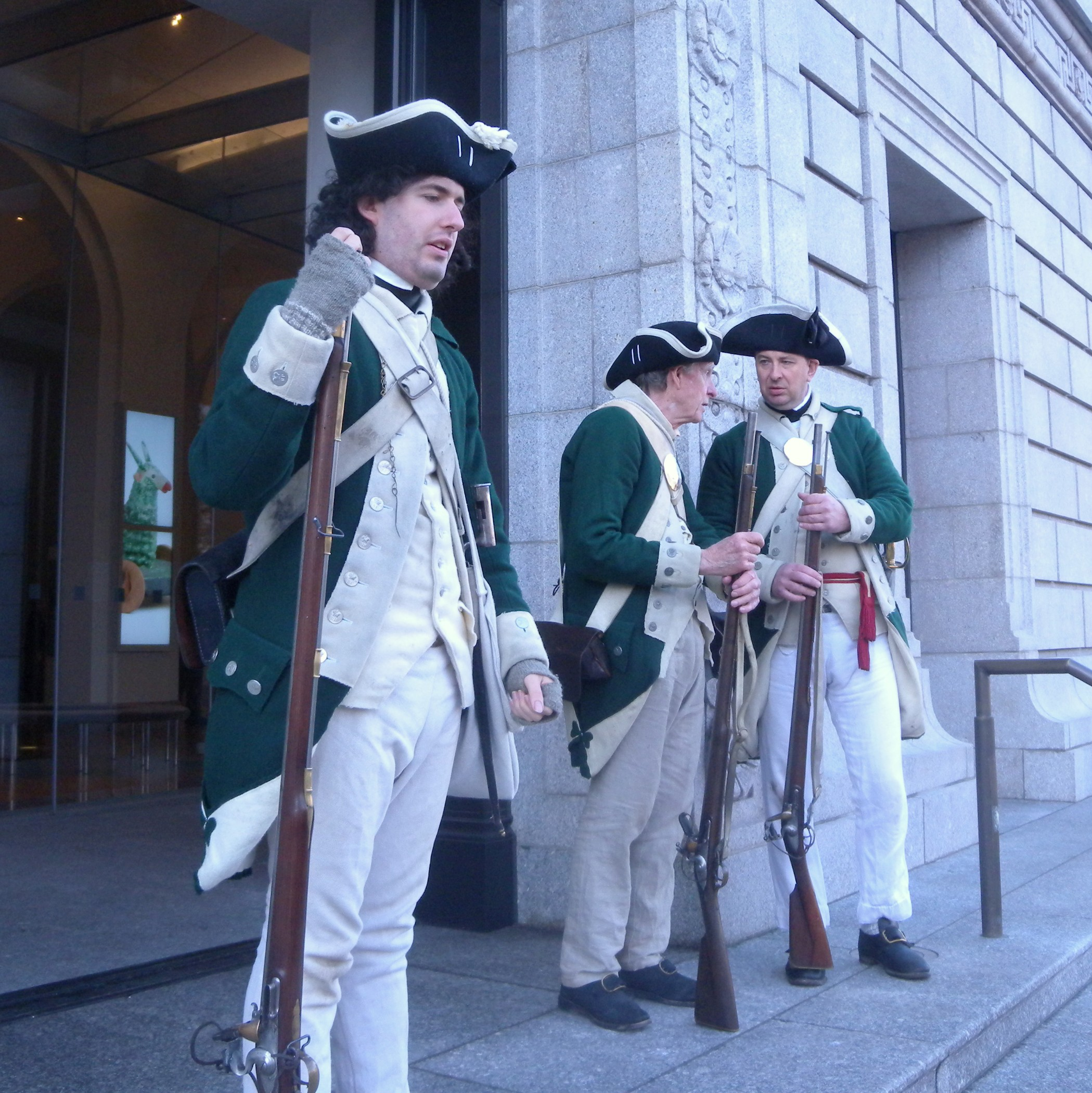
Reenactors portraying the New Jersey Volunteers in front of the New York Historical Society in New York City, 2012

The New Jersey Volunteers was a Loyalist regiment raised in 1776 by Cortlandt Skinner for service in the American Revolutionary War. A combined arms unit consisting of dragoons and infantry which was organizationally part of the Provincial Corps, the regiment fought in the New York and New Jersey campaign and Southern theater of the American Revolutionary War before being disbanded in 1783.

== Regiment formed in Province of New York ==
In 1776, some American loyalist soldiers formed the New Jersey Volunteers, which was raised in the Province of New York, first as three battalions, and eventually as six, of 500 men each.

== Garrison duty ==
The New Jersey Volunteers experienced combat first at the Battle of Long Island, during the British Campaign of New York offensive and after the defeat and flight of the Patriot forces, and was assigned to the initial British garrison of the occupation army, in New York City.

== Campaigns ==
Brigadier General Cortlandt Skinner operated in the region north of New York City, in Westchester County, between Morrisania and the Croton Rivers, which was known as the Neutral Ground. His unit of New Jersey Volunteers was nicknamed "Skinner's Skinners" (the term "skinners" was also applied to all marauders, including Patriot-aligned guerrilla bands). Guerrilla warfare took place between Skinner's Skinners and their rivals, the British Loyalist raiders, De Lancey's Cowboys. Both units stole cattle, looted, and gathered military intelligence for the British army in the New York countryside.

One battalion of New Jersey Volunteers was later sent to East Florida, assisting with the capture of Savannah; others served in the Battles of Eutaw Springs and King's Mountain, with a detachment participating with the Siege of Yorktown.

On September 6, 1781, the 3rd Battalion, New Jersey Volunteers, participated with the raid on New London, Connecticut, commanded by Brigadier General Benedict Arnold, and fought at the Battle of Groton Heights.

== Regiment disbanded and resettled in British Canada ==
In 1783, after the British lost the war, the New Jersey Volunteers regiment was disbanded in the loyalist settlement of Digby, Nova Scotia and New Brunswick in British Canada.
