= Cortlandt Skinner =

Royal Attorney General of New Jersey and a brigadier general

Courtlandt Skinner

Speaker of the New Jersey General Assembly
- In office 1772–1776
- Governor: William Franklin
- Preceded by: Stephen Crane
- Succeeded by: John Hart

Speaker of the New Jersey General Assembly
- In office 1765–1770
- Governor: William Franklin
- Preceded by: Robert Ogden
- Succeeded by: Stephen Crane

Member of the New Jersey General Assembly from the City of Perth Amboy district
- In office 1763–1775 Serving with John Johnston, John L. Johnston, John Coombs

7th New Jersey Attorney General
- In office 1754–1776
- Governor: Jonathan Belcher, Sir Francis Bernard, Thomas Boone, Josiah Hardy, William Franklin
- Preceded by: Joseph Warrell
- Succeeded by: William Paterson

Personal details
- Born: December 16, 1727 Perth Amboy, Province of New Jersey, British America
- Died: March 15, 1799 (aged 71) Bristol, England
- Resting place: St. Augustine's Churchyard, Bristol
- Spouse: Elizabeth Kearney (after 1751)
- Relations: Stephanus Van Cortlandt (grandfather); Sir George Nugent, 1st Baronet (son-in-law)
- Parent(s): William Skinner; Elizabeth Van Cortlandt
- Occupation: Attorney general, attorney, colonial militia officer

Cortlandt Skinner (December 16, 1727 – March 15, 1799) was the last Royal Attorney General of New Jersey and a brigadier general in a Loyalist force, the New Jersey Volunteers, also known as Skinner's Greens, during the American Revolutionary War.

== Before the Revolution ==
Cortlandt Skinner was born December 16, 1727, to a wealthy family in Perth Amboy in the British Province of New Jersey, the eldest son of the Reverend William Skinner and Elizabeth nee Cortland. His grandfather Stephanus Van Cortlandt had been the first native born mayor of New York. Skinner was of English, Dutch and possibly Scottish ancestry. There was a firm family tradition that William Skinner, later the Rector of St. Peter's Church in Perth Amboy, had participated in one of the Jacobite risings and was related to the chiefs of the Clan Gregor – changing his name from MacGregor to avoid the persecution inflicted upon all those of that name.

Skinner studied law at Newark while clerking for David Ogden, a member of the governor's council, and then began practising at Perth Amboy. At the age of twenty-seven, he was appointed Attorney General of New Jersey in 1754 and also acted as speaker of the provincial Assembly between 1765 and 1770 and between 1772 and 1776. Sources differ as to his conduct as Attorney-General, but his general reputation was one of integrity and ability.

== Revolutionary War ==
Skinner was one of the three current and past speakers of the New Jersey colonial assembly who actively opposed American independence. At the outbreak of the hostilities in the American colonies, he was offered by the Patriot rebels the pick of all civilian and military posts. In January 1776, he fled after having received an intercepted letter authorizing his arrest by the Rebels.

As a prominent New Jersey Loyalist, Skinner accepted a commission, on September 4, 1776, as a brigadier general under the British Crown and was authorized to raise a Provincial corps, known as the New Jersey Volunteers or "Skinner's Greens". Three battalions were authorized, to consist of 2,500 soldiers. In the first months of trying to increase enlistments, the corps could only raise 1,000 men, but eventually, Skinner's Greens increased their ranks to 2,000 soldiers. Throughout the war, the New Jersey Volunteers mercilessly harassed their Patriot opponents in the Province of New York, from the defensive outposts of Long Island to Staten Island.

Skinner, for the duration of the war, was the leading civil and military authority over Staten Island. By the end of war in 1783, he was one of the three highest ranking Loyalist officers in the British Army.

His wife and family embarked for England in the summer of 1783, in the Le Solitaire, and were forced into Halifax by stress of weather. He himself followed after the evacuation of New York City. His claim to compensation for his losses as a Loyalist was difficult to adjust and caused the Commissioners much labour, but an allowance was finally made. He also received the half-pay of a Brigadier-General during his life.

== Personal life ==
In 1751, Cortlandt Skinner married Elizabeth Kearney, the daughter of Philip Kearney, of Perth Amboy, Province of New Jersey. They had many children, including:

- Cortlandt Skinner Jr., who held a commission in the British Army in 1782.
- Philip Kearney Skinner (died in London 1826), who was a Lt. General in the British Army.
- John Skinner (died 1832), who became a midshipman in the Royal Navy and, later, commanded a steam-packet between Holyhead and Dublin.
- Isabel Skinner (1765–1812), who married Dr. William Mackenzie Fraser (1754–1807) of Balnain, Scotland (grandparents of diplomat Hugh Fraser).
- Maria Skinner, who married Field-Marshall Sir George Nugent MP.

He died at Bristol, England, in 1799, aged seventy-one. He is buried in St. Augustine's Church, in Bristol.
