= White Sister =

(The) White S/sister(s) may refer to:

== Drama and literature ==
- White Sister (novel), a novel by Stephen Cannell
- The White Sister (play), a 1909 play by Francis Marion Crawford and Walter C. Hackett

== Film ==
- White Sister (film), a 1972 comedy film
- The White Sister (1915 film), starring Viola Allen, based on the play
- The White Sister (1923 film), starring Lillian Gish and Ronald Colman, based on the play
- The White Sister (1933 film), starring Clark Gable and Helen Hayes, based on the play
- The White Sister (1960 film), a Mexican film directed by Tito Davison, based on the play

== Music ==
- White Sister (band), a 1980s music group
- "White Sister", a song by the band Toto from their album Hydra
- White Sisters Trio, a Christian music group that encompassed Arlene White Lawrence and her sisters

== Religion ==
- White Sisters, another name for the Daughters of the Holy Spirit; a Catholic nursing organization
- White Sisters, another name for the Missionary Sisters of Our Lady of Africa; a Catholic missionary organization

== Other ==
- White Sister, a fictional character in the 2011 role-playing video game Hyperdimension Neptunia Mk2
- The White Sisters, moniker for the American philanthropists Amelia Elizabeth White and Martha Root White
- The White Sisters, an informal name for the P&O ships RMS Strathnaver and the RMS Strathaird, due to their white-coloured hulls
