= Graustark (1915 film) =

1915 film by Broncho Billy Anderson, Fred E. Wright

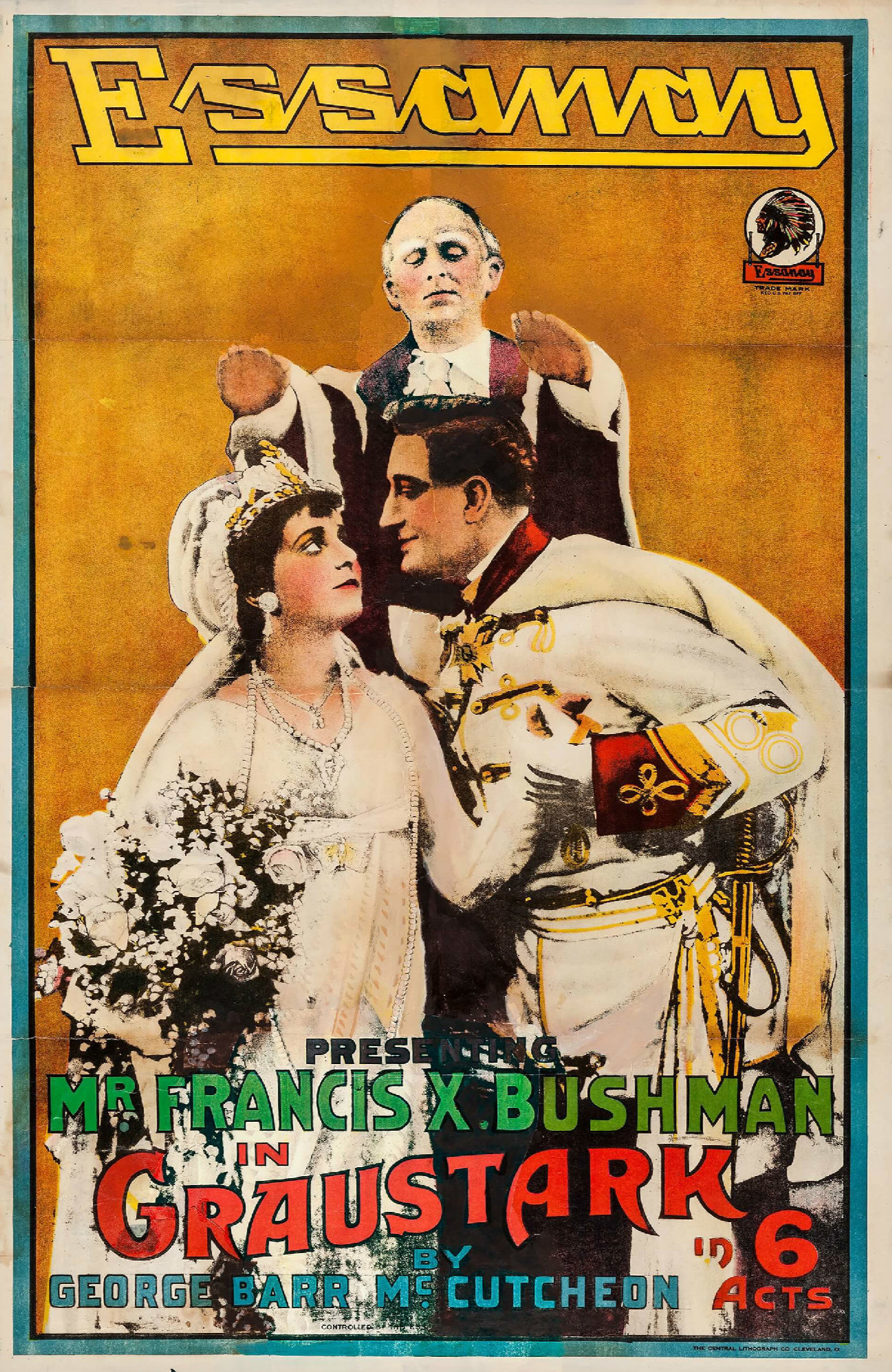
- Poster
- Directed by: Fred E. Wright
- Written by: H. Tipton Steck (scenario)
- Based on: Graustark by George Barr McCutcheon
- Produced by: Essanay Studios
- Starring: Francis X. Bushman; Beverly Bayne
- Cinematography: Jackson J. Rose
- Distributed by: V-L-S-E, Incorporated
- Release date: April 16, 1915
- Running time: 6 reels
- Country: United States
- Language: Silent (English intertitles)

Graustark is a 1915 American silent adventure drama film produced by the Essanay Studios. It is based on the novel Graustark by George Barr McCutcheon. The film starred romantic team Francis X. Bushman and Beverly Bayne and proved one of their most popular vehicles. Fred E. Wright directed the film.

The 1923 Fox film Truxton King with John Gilbert is based on one of the sequels. The film Graustark was remade in 1925 as Graustark with Norma Talmadge.

== Cast ==
- Francis X. Bushman as Grenfall Lorry
- Beverly Bayne as Princess Yetive
- Edna Mayo as Countess Dagmar
- Thomas Commerford as Uncle Caspar
- Helen Dunbar as Aunt Yvonne
- Alan Roscoe as Harry Anguish
- Lester Cuneo as Prince Gabriel
- Bryant Washburn as Prince Lorenz
- Ernest Maupain as Prince Bolarez

== Preservation status ==
Prints of Graustark are preserved in the George Eastman Museum Motion Picture Collection and the EYE Film Institute Netherlands.

== See also ==
- The Prince of Graustark (film)
