= The Trufflers =

1917 film by Fred E. Wright

- Directed by: Fred E. Wright
- Written by: Samuel Merwin (novel); Fred E. Wright
- Starring: Nell Craig; Sidney Ainsworth; Ernest Maupain
- Cinematography: Jackson Rose
- Production company: Essanay Studios
- Distributed by: General Film Company
- Release date: April 9, 1917
- Running time: 5 reels
- Country: United States
- Languages: Silent; English intertitles

The Trufflers is a 1917 American silent drama film directed by Fred E. Wright and starring Nell Craig, Sidney Ainsworth and Ernest Maupain.

== Cast ==
- Nell Craig as Sue Wilde
- Sidney Ainsworth as Peter Ericson Mann
- Ernest Maupain as Jacob Zanin
- Richard Travers as Henry Bates
- Patrick Calhoun as Hy Lowe
- Harry Dunkinson as Abe Silverstone
- John Cossar as Dr. Hubbell Harkness
- Virginia Bowker as Betty Deane

== Bibliography ==
- Langman, Larry. American Film Cycles: The Silent Era. Greenwood Publishing, 1998.
