= The Prince of Graustark (film) =

1916 silent film

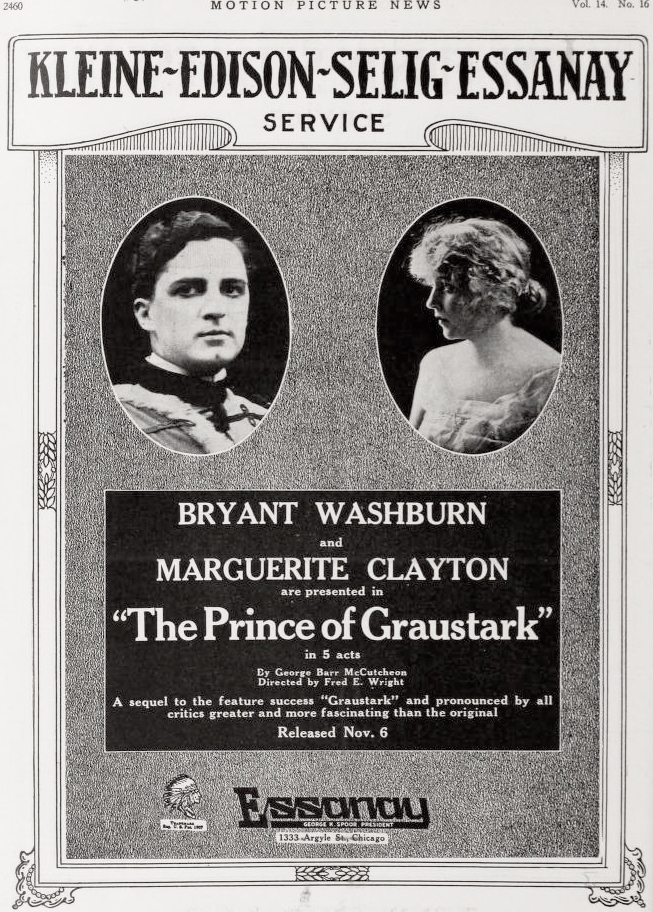
- Directed by: Fred E. Wright
- Written by: Fred E. Wright
- Based on: The Prince of Graustark by George Barr McCutcheon
- Starring: Bryant Washburn; Marguerite Clayton; Sidney Ainsworth
- Cinematography: Jackson Rose
- Production company: Essanay Pictures
- Distributed by: K-E-S-E Service
- Release date: November 6, 1916
- Running time: 50 minutes
- Country: United States
- Languages: Silent; English intertitles

The Prince of Graustark is a 1916 American silent romantic drama film directed by Fred E. Wright and starring Bryant Washburn, Marguerite Clayton and Sidney Ainsworth. Produced by the Chicago-based Essanay Pictures, it is based on the 1914 novel of the same title by George Barr McCutcheon. Future star Colleen Moore made her screen debut in an uncredited role as a maid. A print of The Prince of Graustark exists in the George Eastman Museum film archive.

== Cast ==
- Bryant Washburn as Prince Robin of Graustark
- Marguerite Clayton as Princess of Dawsbergen
- Sidney Ainsworth as Count Quinnox
- Ernest Maupain as William H. Blithers
- Florence Oberle as Mrs. Blithers
- John Cossar as Baron Douglas
- William V. Mong as Aide to Count Quinnox
- Colleen Moore as Maid

== See also ==
- Graustark (1915 film)

== Bibliography ==
- Abel, Richard. Menus for Movieland: Newspapers and the Emergence of American Film Culture, 1913–1916. University of California Press, 2015.
