= The White Sister (1923 film) =

1923 film

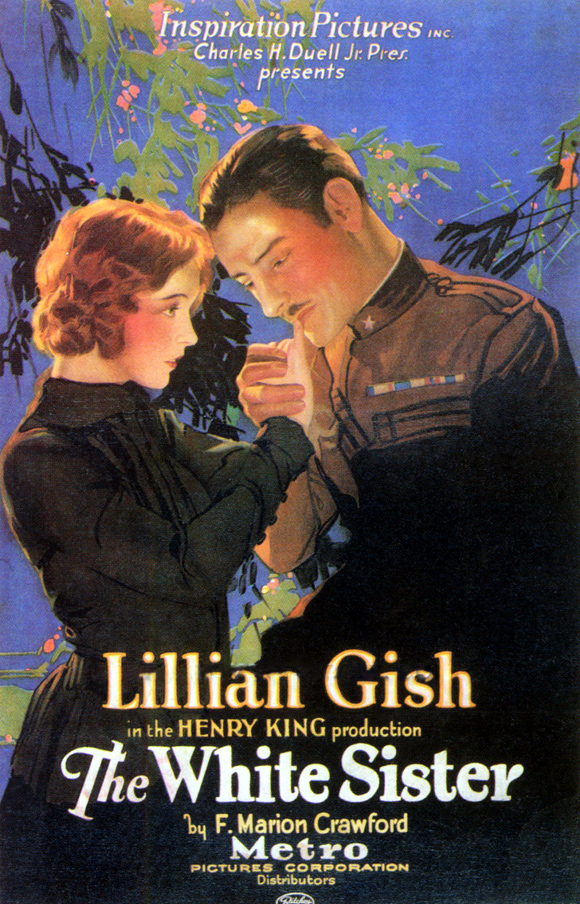
- Theatrical release poster
- Directed by: Henry King
- Written by: George V. Hobart; Charles E. Whittaker; Will M. Ritchey; Don Bartlett
- Based on: The White Sister; 1909 play by F. Marion Crawford; Walter Hackett
- Produced by: Henry King
- Starring: Lillian Gish; Ronald Colman
- Cinematography: Roy F. Overbaugh; William Schurr; Fernando Risi
- Edited by: W. Duncan Mansfield
- Music by: Joseph Carl Breil
- Distributed by: Metro Pictures
- Release date: September 5, 1923
- Running time: 143 minutes; 13 reels
- Country: United States
- Language: Silent (English intertitles)
- Box office: $4 million

The White Sister (1923)

The White Sister is a 1923 American silent drama film starring Lillian Gish and Ronald Colman, directed by Henry King, and belatedly released by Metro Pictures. It was based on the 1909 play of the same name by Francis Marion Crawford and Walter Hackett. It is the second of four adaptations of the play, preceded by a 1915 production and followed by a 1933 sound film, starring Helen Hayes and Clark Gable, and a 1960 Mexican production.

== Plot ==
Angela Chiaromonte and Captain Giovanni Severini are deeply in love, but Angela's wealthy father, Prince Chiaromonte, does not know this and arranges her marriage, without her knowledge, to the son of Count del Ferice. However, the prince dies in an accident.

While Angela grieves, her older half-sister, the Marchesa di Mola, looks through their late father's papers and secretly burns one of them. No will can be found, so not only does the entire estate go to the Marchesa, but because the prince's second marriage was not registered with the civil authorities, it is not legally valid, making Angela "nobody". With that, Count del Ferice dissolves the marriage contract between Angela and his son.

The Marchesa orders Angela to leave the palace that very day, revealing that she has always hated her stepsister for "whining" her way into their father's affection and for taking Giovanni, the only man she ever loved. Madame Bernard, Angela's companion and chaperone, takes her in.

Giovanni finds her, but has some bad news. He has been appointed to command an expedition to Africa and must leave the next morning. However, he promises they will be married the day he returns.

His camp is attacked by Arabs, and Italian newspapers announce that all have been massacred. When Angela hears the news, she becomes catatonic. She is taken to the Santa Giovanna d'Aza hospital, which is run by nuns. After several days, the painter Durand, himself hopelessly in love with Angela, paints a portrait of Giovanni and brings it to the hospital, hoping it will help. Angela at first mistakes it for Giovanni, kissing it several times, but then comes to her senses. After a while, she informs Monsignor Seracinesca, an old family friend, that she intends to become a nun, a white sister, in honor of Giovanni.

However, Giovanni is still alive. For two years, he languishes as a captive until the death of his sole comrade gives him the chance to overpower their guard and escape. On the ship back to Italy, he is ordered not to speak to anyone until he has seen the Minister of War. That same day, Angela takes her final vows in a solemn ceremony, dedicating her life to God.

Giovanni's older brother, Professor Ugo Severi, breaks down after years of research trying to harness the power of Mount Vesuvius and is taken to the Santa Giovanna d'Aza hospital. Giovanni visits him, and by chance, meets Angela. After their initial shock, he embraces and tries to kiss her. She responds at first, but then remembers her circumstances and runs to her room. Monsignor Saracinesca restrains Giovanni from following, explaining that Angela is now a bride of Christ.

Giovanni refuses to accept that. He lures Angela by false pretenses to his brother's observatory. He tries to get her to sign a petition to the pope requesting a release from her vows, but she refuses. When Giovanni sees that all his pleadings are useless, he allows her to leave.

The Marchesa tries to persuade Monsignor Saracinesca that Angela has gone willingly to be with her lover. He does not believe her, but sets out for the observatory anyway. Meanwhile, Giovanni notices that his brother's invention indicates that Vesuvius is about to erupt. He rides to warn the townsfolk, passing Saracinesca on the way.

The Marchesa's carriage is wrecked when her horses bolt, startled by lightning. Fatally injured, she crawls and stumbles to an empty church, her only thought to confess her sins before dying. By chance, Angela seeks shelter there. Not recognizing her, the Marchesa confesses she burned the will out of hatred and asks if her sister will forgive her. After a visible struggle with her emotions, Angela says she does, before her sister passes away.

Vesuvius erupts, spewing lava and breaking a water reservoir. However, Giovanni has been in time. Most of the townspeople are saved, but Giovanni drowns while helping a mother and her children. Afterward, Angela asks God to keep him safe until they can be reunited.

== Cast ==
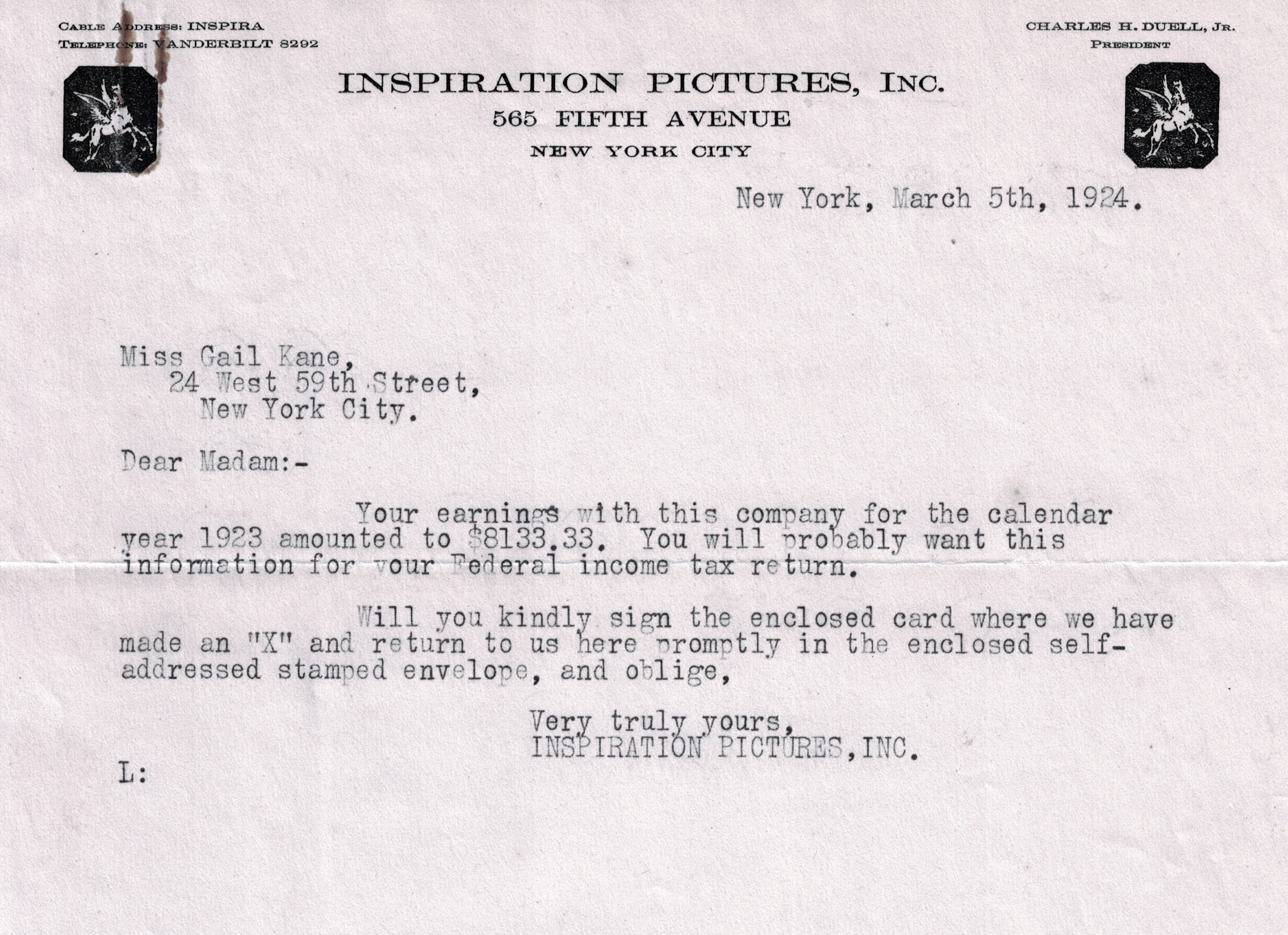
Letter from Inspiration Pictures Inc. informing Gail Kane of her 1923 earnings for The White Sister.

- Lillian Gish as Angela Chiaromonte
- Ronald Colman as Captain Giovanni Severini
- Gail Kane as Marchesa di Mola
- J. Barney Sherry as Monsignor Saracinesca
- Charles Lane as Prince Chiaromonte
- Juliette La Violette as Madame Bernard
- Gustavo Serena as Professor Ugo Severi (as Signor Serena)
- Alfredo Bertone as Filmore Durand
- Bonaventura Ibáñez as Count del Ferice (as Roman Ibañez)
- Alfredo Martinelli as Alfredo del Ferice
- Ida Carloni Talli as Mother Superior (as Carloni Talli)
- Giovanni Viccola as Gen. Mazzini
- Antonio Barda as Alfredo's Tutor
- Giacomo D'Attino as Solicitor to the Prince
- Michele Gualdi as Solicitor to Count
- Giuseppe Pavoni as The Archbishop
- Francesco Socinus as Prof. Torricelli
- Sheik Mahomet as The Bedouin Chief
- James E. Abbe as Lt. Rossini (as James Abbe)
- W. Duncan Mansfield as Cmdr. Dorato (as Duncan Mansfield)
- Ferruccio Biancini
- Thelma Raye

== Production ==
Gish turned down a weekly salary of $3500 from Tiffany Pictures and instead signed with Inspiration Pictures for $1500 and a share of the profits. Inspiration had purchased the rights to the novel The White Sister for $16,000.

In November 1922, a crew of 24 set sail for Naples, Italy, aboard the SS Providence for what was to be three months of location shooting. Filming took place in studios in Rome and outdoor locations in Rome and Naples, with the desert scenes shot in Algeria. Gish involved herself in all aspects of the production. The Catholic Church provided guidance on religious matters. Gish stated it took 25 hours straight, with a 2 1/2-hour break, to film the scene in which she takes her final vows. The production lasted nearly twice as long as planned, due in part to inadequately equipped studio facilities.

== Distribution ==
The film premiered in New York City on September 5, 1923, without a national distribution deal in place. After six months, Metro Pictures agreed to take on the task.

== Reception ==
The New York Times reviewer wrote that "The film starts out as one of the strongest love stories that has ever been filmed. But the death of Giovanni and the latter part of the story weaken what might have been a perfect love story of Italy." The critic praised the cast as "excellent", singling out Colman and Kane's performances and observing that "Miss Gish's acting is always restrained. She obtains the full effect in every situation, being, as the Italians say, sympatico in all sequences.

In his review of the 1933 version, New York Times critic Mordaunt Hall found it inferior by comparison, writing, "It is a beautiful production, but its scenes never seem as real as those of the old mute work."

== See also ==
- Lillian Gish filmography
