= The Raven (1915 film) =

1915 film (biography of Edgar Allan Poe) directed by Charles Brabin

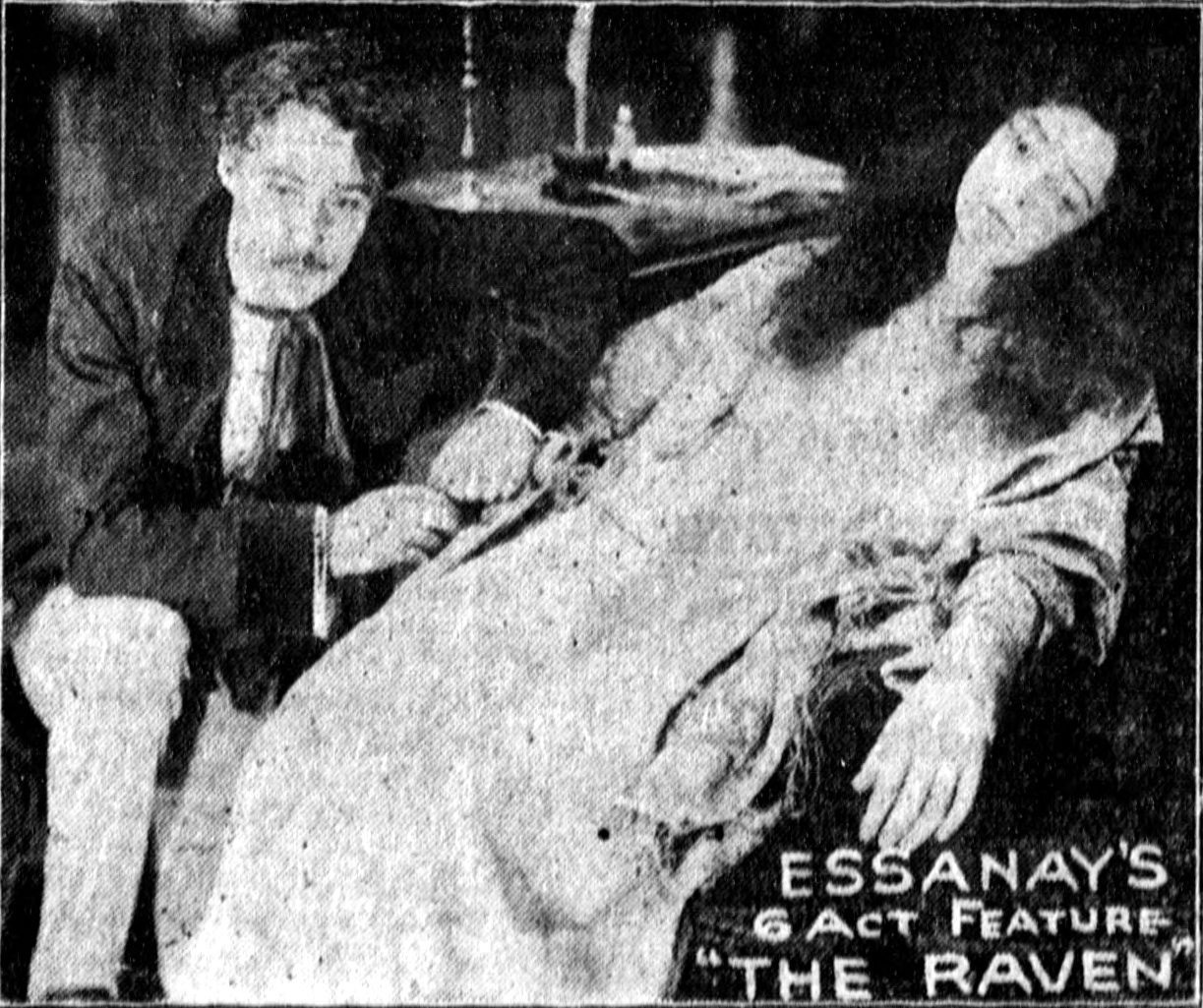
- Scene from the film
- Directed by: Charles Brabin
- Written by: Charles Brabin (scenario)
- Based on: The Raven: The Love Story of Edgar Allan Poe by George C. Hazelton
- Starring: Henry B. Walthall; Ernest Maupain; Warda Howard; Marian Skinner; Harry Dunkinson
- Production company: Essanay Film Manufacturing Company
- Distributed by: V-L-S-E, Incorporated
- Release date: November 8, 1915
- Running time: 80 minutes
- Country: United States
- Language: Silent (English intertitles)

The Raven is a stylized silent 1915 American biographical film of Edgar Allan Poe starring Henry B. Walthall as Poe. The film was written and directed by Charles Brabin from a play by George C. Hazelton.

== Plot ==
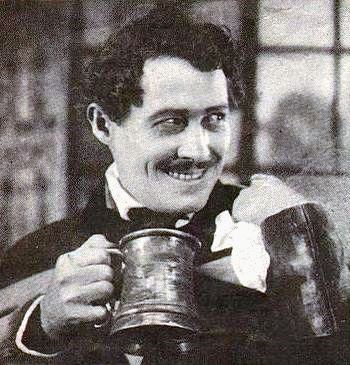
Henry B. Walthall as Edgar Allan Poe in The Raven

The film begins by tracing Poe's ancestral heritage before Poe himself is born. After the loss of his parents, Poe is taken in by the John and Francis Allan in Richmond, Virginia. The film then jumps ahead about 15 years to Poe's time at the University of Virginia. Due to debts from playing cards and a growing interest in wine, Poe begins to have difficulties. He hallucinates that he has killed a man in a pistol duel.

Poe meets Virginia and they spend a day together, riding a horse and sitting "beside the glassy pool of romance." He tells her a fairy tale, a raven perching on Poe's shoulder as he finishes the story, before they go on a walk together. Upon seeing a black slave (listed in the credits only as "Negro") being whipped, he buys the slave with an IOU for $600.00. The slave's former owner then goes to John Allan to collect the debt. Allan calls Poe a "scoundrel" for causing so many bills.

After having a drink with his "chum" Tony, Poe goes to visit Virginia. Tony follows shortly after and the two compete for Virginia's affection. Later, Virginia says she will choose the man who guesses which hand holds a wreath behind her back. Poe allows Tony to go first and, though he guesses correctly, Virginia secretly switches the wreath to the other hand so that Poe can win. Shortly after, in front of Tony and Virginia, Allan questions Poe's spending habits. Allan causes quite a scene, despite his wife's attempts to calm him. Poe is asked to leave the Allan family but Virginia offers to come along. Poe's recently purchased slave comes along as well.

Poe, in Fordham, New York, is in "dire poverty" along with Virginia and her mother Maria. Virginia has a terrible coughing fit, a sign of her tuberculosis. Poe, desperate for money, unsuccessfully attempts to sell some of his work to George Rex Graham. Virginia, bothered by the cold winter weather, is kept warm by Poe's old coat from his time at West Point and from their pet black cat. She dies the next day, causing Poe great grief.

Sarah Helen Whitman is introduced at the end of the film, assisting an elderly couple. She meets Poe on her walk home through what seems to be a graveyard. Poe thinks she is Virginia Reincarnated and proceeds to follow her home. She rejects him when he makes advances, then Poe proceeds home where he starts hearing the tapping and recites “the raven”first seeing the shadow of a raven appear on his door. Hallucinating he begins climbing up a hill, and then resting on a rock that says wine, trying to move up past it he ends up perched on top of it before coming back to reality in his room. He goes to grab a drink and watches his wine glass turn to a skull, the horror causing him to drop it. A raven enters his room when he opens his window, answering all Poe’s questions with Nevermore. His hallucinations show him with a ghost and then at heavens gate in front of an angel, as the gates close leaving Poe outside. Once returned to reality he finishes the poem before departing from his body. His death ending the film.

== Cast ==
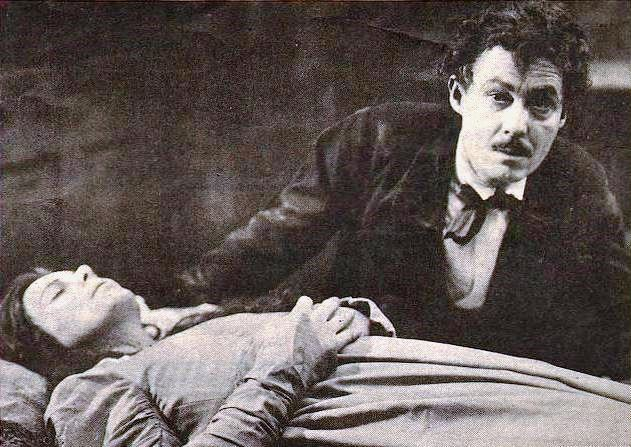
Warda Howard and Henry B. Walthall in The Raven

- Henry B. Walthall as Edgar Allan Poe
- Warda Howard as Virginia Clemm / Helen Whitman / The Lost Lenore / A Spirit
- Ernest Maupain as John Allan
- Eleanor Thompson as Mrs. Allan
- Marian Skinner as Mrs. Clemm (credited as Marion Skinner)
- Harry Dunkinson as Tony
- Grant Foreman as George Rex Graham
- Hugh Thompson as David Poe Jr. (credited as Hugh E. Thompson)
- Peggy Meredith as Mrs. Hopkins Poe
- Frank Hamilton as David Poe Sr.
- Billy Robinson as Joseph Reed
- Bert Weston as Negro
- Charles Harris as Mr. Pelham (credited as Charles K. Harris)

== Production ==
Henry B. Walthall was granted the lead role as Edgar Allan Poe after previously playing the same author in D. W. Griffith's The Avenging Conscience in 1914. Because of the repeat role, he was dubbed "the image of Poe."

== See also ==
- Edgar Allan Poe in popular culture
- Edgar Allan Poe in television and film
- The Death of Poe (2006 DVD which includes The Raven as a special feature)
