= Graustark (1925 film) =

1925 film directed by Dimitri Buchowetzki

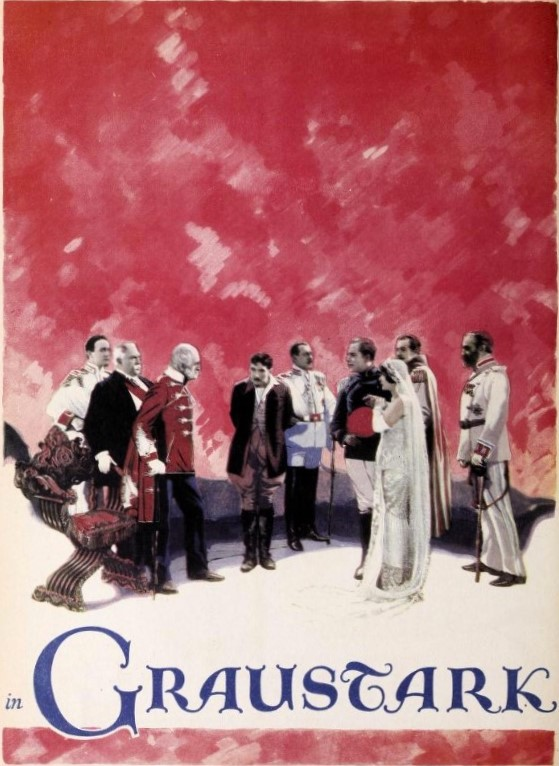
- Advertisement
- Directed by: Dimitri Buchowetzki
- Written by: Marian Ainslee (titles); Frances Marion (adaptation)
- Based on: Graustark by George Barr McCutcheon
- Starring: Norma Talmadge
- Cinematography: Tony Gaudio
- Production company: Norma Talmadge Film Corporation
- Distributed by: First National
- Release date: August 30, 1925
- Running time: 7 reels
- Country: United States
- Language: Silent (English intertitles)

Graustark is a 1925 American silent romantic adventure film produced by Dimitri Buchowetzki for Norma Talmadge Productions and distributed by First National. It is based on the novel Graustark by George Barr McCutcheon. It was directed by Dimitri Buchowetzki with Norma Talmadge as the leading woman.

The novel was previously filmed under the same title in 1915; Truxton King (1923) is based on one of the sequel novels.

== Plot ==
As described in a film magazine reviews, Princess Yetive meets Lorry while she is traveling in America under an assumed name. She leaves him in New York City when a friend, Prince Gabriel, tells her that her father is dying. Having received no message of good-bye, Lorry is concerned about her; and starts out to find her. In Graustark, when the American Ambassador takes him to a court ball, he recognizes the young woman as the Princess. It develops that her father was not dying, but that Gabriel had used the message as a ruse to get her to return to Graustark and marry him. Yetive secretly meets Lorry, but they are spied upon. A conspirator, Dangloss, attempts to stab Lorry. Lorry shoots Dangloss and is then arrested and sentenced to death. Yetive aids Lorry's escape in a motor car. Gabriel captures them, but the Princess promises Gabriel that she will return to marry him if he will let Lorry escape. Lorry finds Dangloss in a town tavern and realizes he had been shamming his death. He binds him and returns to the palace in time to stop the wedding and claims Yetive. Dangloss confesses that Gabriel was responsible for the plot against Princess Yetive and Lorry.

== Cast ==
- Norma Talmadge as Princess Yetive
- Eugene O'Brien as Grenfall Lorry
- Marc McDermott as Prince Gabriel
- Roy D'Arcy as Dangloss
- Albert Gran as Count Halfont
- Lillian Lawrence as Countess Halfont
- Michael Vavitch as Capt. Quinnox
- Frank Currier as King
- Winter Hall as Ambassador
- Wanda Hawley as Dagmar

== Preservation ==
An incomplete print of Graustark is held by the Library of Congress.
