= That Sort =

1916 silent film

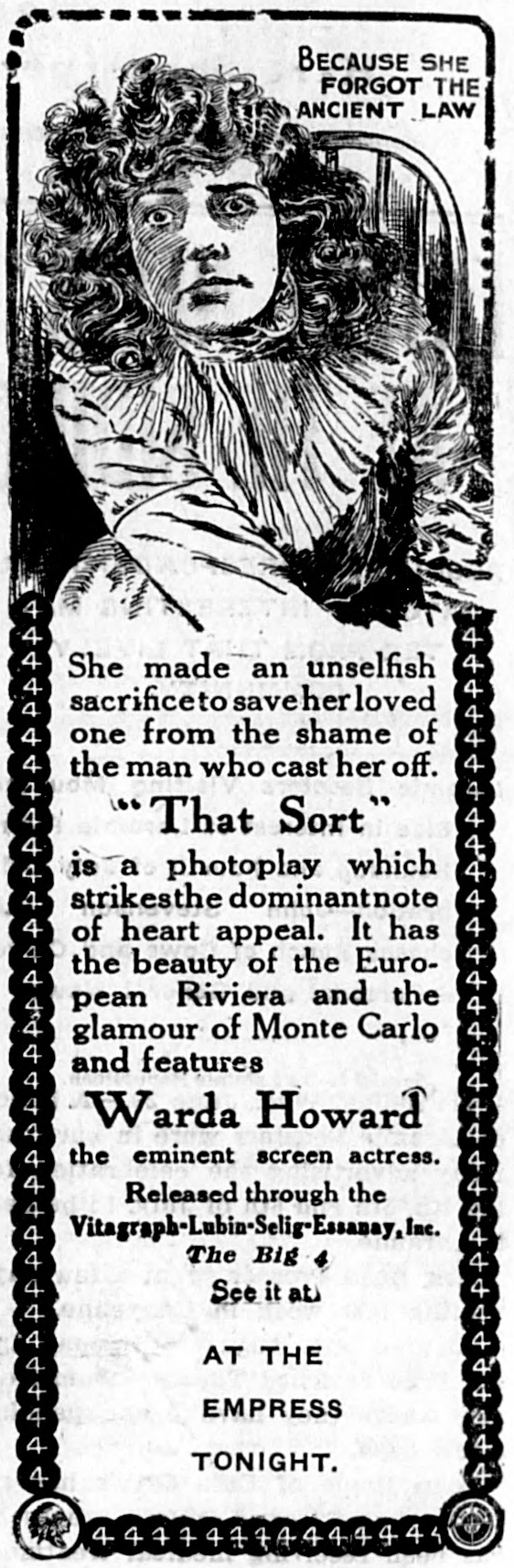
- Contemporary advertisement
- Directed by: Charles Brabin
- Written by: Basil Macdonald Hastings (play); Charles Brabin
- Starring: Warda Howard; Duncan McRae; Ernest Maupain
- Cinematography: Arthur Reeves
- Production company: Essanay Studios
- Distributed by: V-L-S-E
- Release date: June 12, 1916
- Running time: 50 minutes
- Country: United States
- Languages: Silent; English intertitles

That Sort is a lost 1916 American silent drama film directed by Charles Brabin and starring Warda Howard, Duncan McRae and Ernest Maupain.

== Cast ==
- Warda Howard as Diana Laska
- Duncan McRae as John Heppell
- Ernest Maupain as Doctor Maxwell
- John Lorenz as Philip Goddier
- Betty Brown as Maureen Heppell
- Peggy Sweeney as An actress
- Marian Skinner as Mrs. Heppell

== Preservation ==
With no holdings located in archives, That Sort is considered a lost film.

== Bibliography ==
- Parish, James Robert & Pitts, Michael R. . Film Directors: A Guide to their American Films. Scarecrow Press, 1974.
