= George Cochrane Hazelton (actor) =

American actor and dramatist

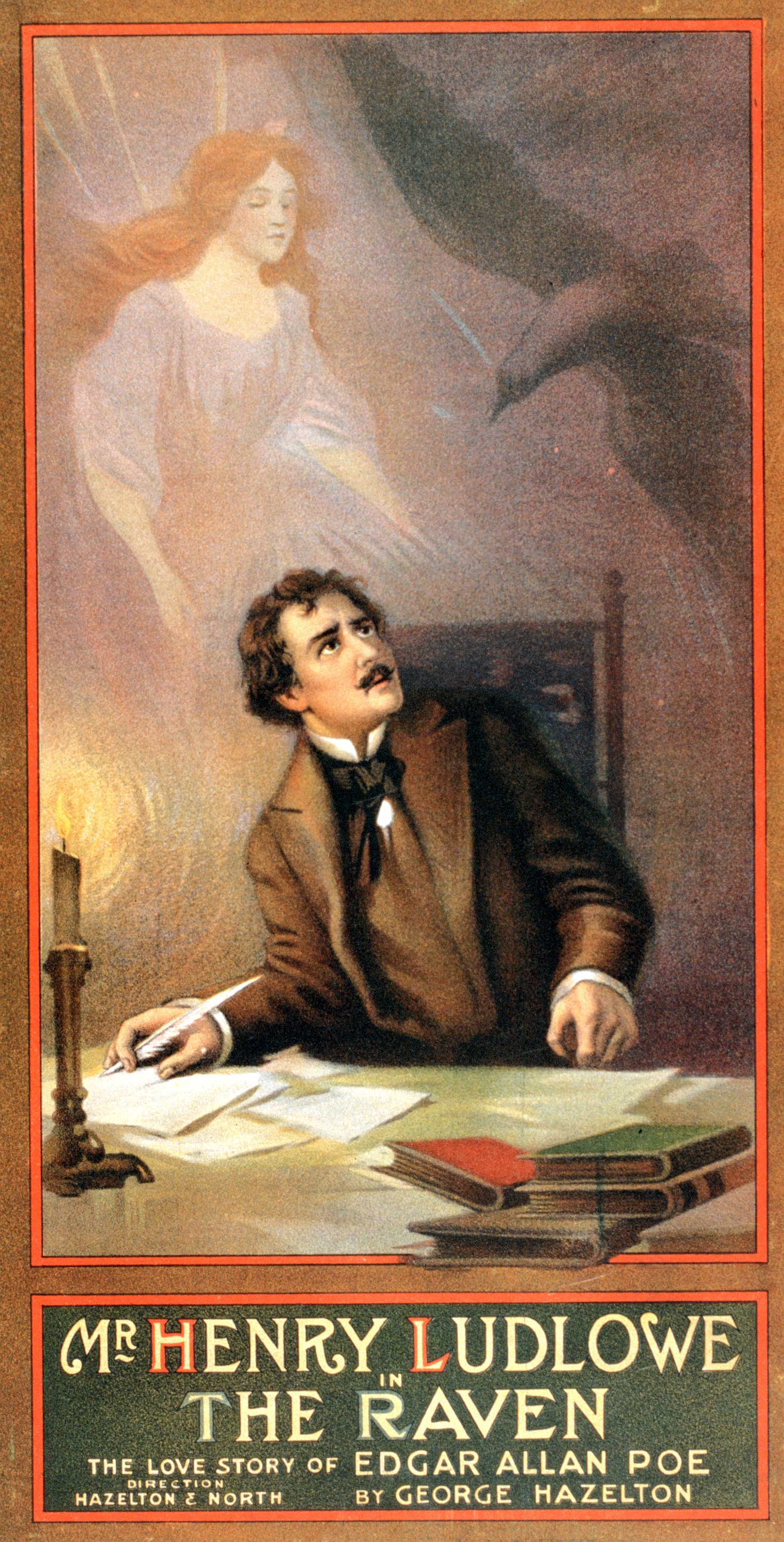
Poster for a 1908 production of George Hazelton's The Raven: The Love Story of Edgar Allan Poe

George Cochrane Hazelton (1868–1921) was an American actor and playwright.

Hazelton was born January 20, 1868 in Boscobel, Wisconsin. He performed as an actor with Lawrence Barrett, Edwin Booth, and Helena Modjeska. His first attempt as a playwright was The Raven: The Love Story of Edgar Allan Poe, which was later made into a film. His next play, Mistress Nell, was written in 1900 and was a great success. His most well-known play was The Yellow Jacket, which he co-authored in 1912 with J. Harry Benrimo. The Yellow Jacket was performed around the world by a number of notable actors including Mr. and Mrs. Charles Coburn and Harpo Marx. Hazelton died in New York on June 24, 1921.

== Relatives ==
Hazelton was the son of politician George Cochrane Hazelton.
