= White and Unmarried =

1921 film by Tom Forman

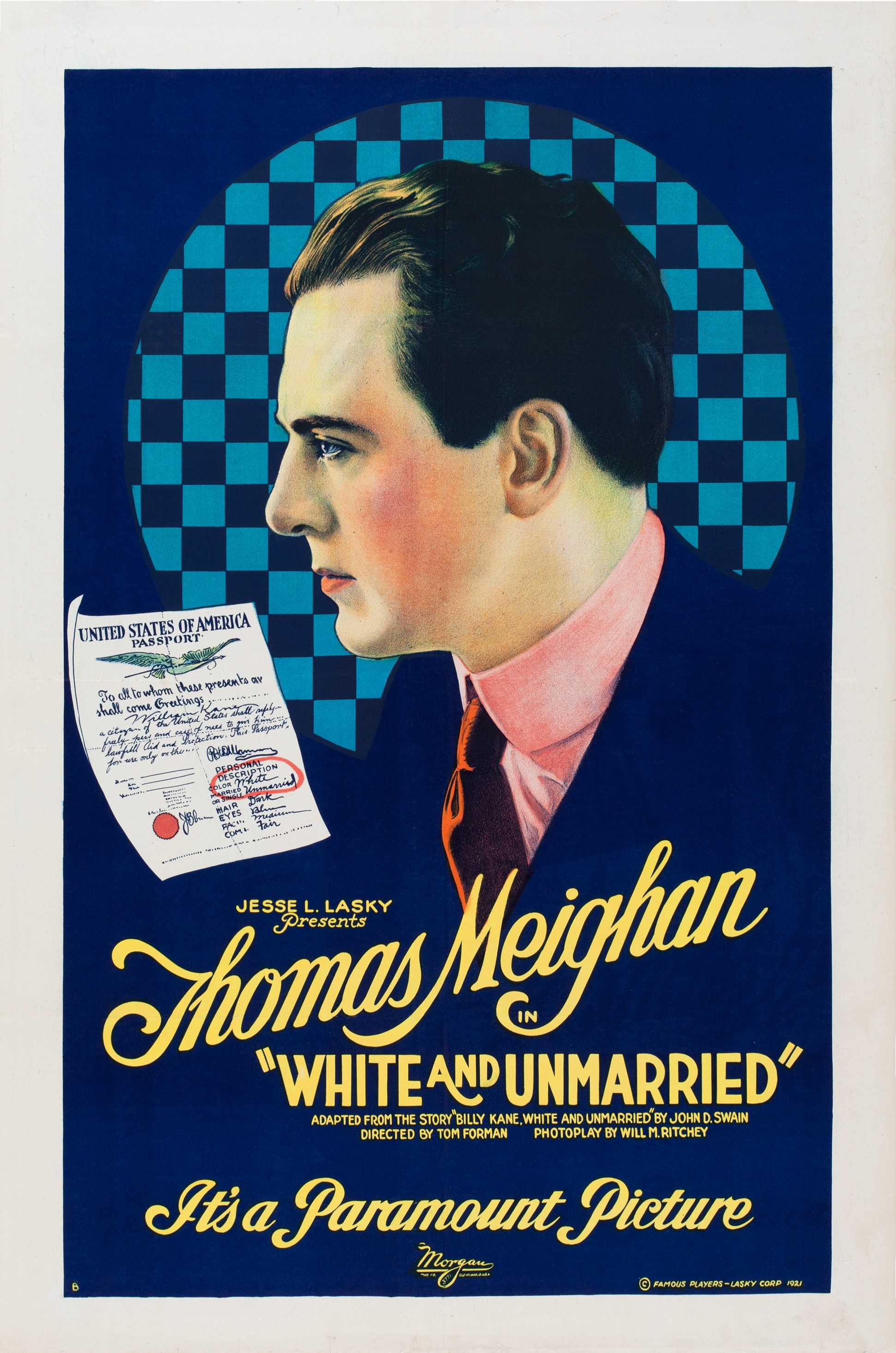
- Theatrical release poster
- Directed by: Tom Forman
- Screenplay by: Will M. Ritchey; John D. Swain
- Produced by: Jesse L. Lasky
- Starring: Thomas Meighan; Jacqueline Logan; Grace Darmond; Walter Long; Lloyd Whitlock; Frederick Vroom; Marian Skinner
- Cinematography: Harry Perry
- Production company: Famous Players–Lasky Corporation
- Distributed by: Paramount Pictures
- Release date: May 29, 1921
- Running time: 50 minutes
- Country: United States
- Language: Silent (English intertitles)

White and Unmarried is a lost 1921 American comedy silent film directed by Tom Forman and written by Will M. Ritchey and John D. Swain. The film stars Thomas Meighan, Jacqueline Logan, Grace Darmond, Walter Long, Lloyd Whitlock, Frederick Vroom, and Marian Skinner. The film was released on May 29, 1921, by Paramount Pictures.

== Plot ==
When an underworld figure inherits a fortune, he goes straight and endeavors to become a respectable businessman. But on a trip to Paris, he encounters a few not-so-honest types who think he is ripe for picking.

== Cast ==
- Thomas Meighan as Billy Kane
- Jacqueline Logan as Andrée Duphot
- Grace Darmond as Dorothea Welter
- Walter Long as Chicoq
- Lloyd Whitlock as Marechal
- Frederick Vroom as Mr. Welter
- Marian Skinner as Mrs. Welter
- Georgie Stone as Victor
- Jack Herbert as Jacques
- Loretta Young as a child (uncredited)
