= The White Sister (play) =

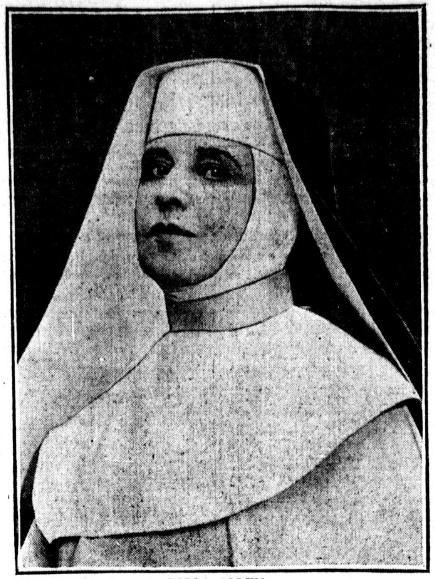
Viola Allen as Sister Giovanna in The White Sister.

The White Sister is a play in four acts by Francis Marion Crawford and Walter Hackett. The play was originally written by Crawford in 1907 and he later adapted the play into a serialized novel which was first published over a six-month period in Munsey's Magazine beginning in January 1909. The play was given its world premiere at the Stone Opera House in Binghamton, New York on February 8, 1909, with a cast led by Viola Allen as Sister Giovanna and Frank Gillmore as Captain Giovanni Severi. While the novel began its serialized publication in Munsey's Magazine prior to the premiere of the play, the play was written first and the novel was adapted by Crawford from the earlier play.

== History ==
Prior to the stage premiere of The White Sister, the producers of the production, Liebler & Co., wanted alterations made to the work, and playwright Walter C. Hackett was brought in to make changes to the play's script in 1908 when Crawford was too ill to continue working on his final play. As a result, both Hackett and Crawford were credited as joint authors of the work. It is this adapted version of the work by Crawford and Hackett that was the basis for several screen adaptations.

The White Sister was Crawford's last play and he died in April 1909 before the play toured to Broadway's Daly's Theatre where it opened on September 27, 1909, and ran for 48 performances. At this point in the original production's tour, actor William Farnum had succeeded Frank Gillmore as Giovanni Serrri. Others in the Broadway cast included James O'Neill as Monsignore Saracinesca and actresses Minna Gale, Fanny Addison Pitt, and Belle Chippendale Warner as nuns.

== Plot ==
Both the play and the novel share the same story. The plot is set in Italy and is about a tragic love affair in which two lovers, Giovanna and Giovanni, are separated when Giovanni is sent off to fight a war in Africa. News of Giovanni being missing in action comes to Giovanna, and she waits for two years for his return before giving up hope and deciding to join a Dominican Order of nuns. Three years later, Giovanna is living in a convent and working as a supervising nurse in a Catholic hospital when she is unexpectedly reunited with Giovanni when he is one of her patients at the hospital. Giovanni is overjoyed to see her and attempts to convince Giovanna to leave the nuns and go away with him once he has recovered. Still in love with Giovanni but also determined to follow her religious vows, Giovanna remains steadfast in her commitment to God but is emotionally distraught. Heartbroken, Giovanni's condition worsens and he dies with Giovanna stricken with grief.

== Film adaptations ==
- The White Sister (1915 film): This first silent film adaptation starred Viola Allen and was a reprisal of her role from the stage play.
- The White Sister (1923 film)
- The White Sister (1933 film)
- The White Sister (1960 film)
