= The Stranger (1924 film) =

1924 film by Joseph Henabery

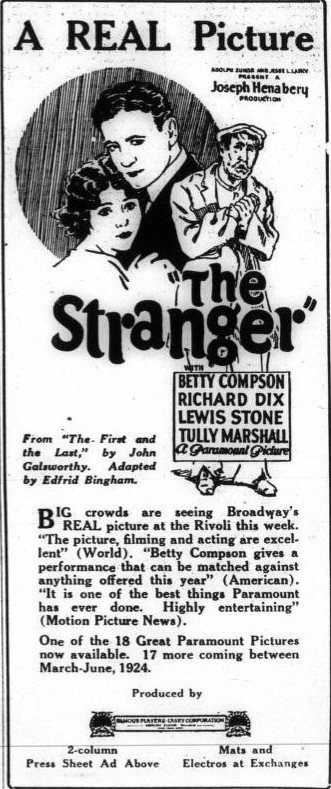
- Advertisement
- Directed by: Joseph Henabery
- Written by: Edfrid A. Bingham (adaptation)
- Based on: The First and the Last; 1918 novel by John Galsworthy
- Produced by: Adolph Zukor; Jesse Lasky
- Starring: Betty Compson; Richard Dix
- Cinematography: Faxon M. Dean; L. Guy Wilky
- Distributed by: Paramount Pictures
- Release date: February 24, 1924
- Running time: 70 minutes; 7 reels
- Country: United States
- Language: Silent (English intertitles)

The Stranger is a 1924 American silent drama film directed by Joseph Henabery and starring Betty Compson and Richard Dix. It is based on a 1918 novel, The First and the Last, by John Galsworthy. It was produced by Famous Players–Lasky and distributed through Paramount Pictures.

== Plot ==
As described in a review of the film in a film magazine, just as Keith Darrant, a high-class Englishman, has a chance for political honors, his ne'er-do-well brother Larry appears on the scene. Larry makes the acquaintance of Peggy Bowlin, a girl who is down and out, and a strong friendship begins. After a time Larry installs the girl in a better neighborhood and just as they are preparing to marry and leave England, a convict who blames her for his having to go to jail returns, and in a fight Larry accidentally kills him. "The Stranger", an outcast working in the saloon which the girl frequented, is arrested for the murder and refuses to say anything, fearing it will injure the girl's new found happiness. The stranger is convicted and, as he is ready to pay the supreme penalty on the scaffold, Larry convinces Keith he must throw all considerations to the winds and save the old man. Just as they arrive on the scene, the thought of freedom is too much for the stranger. He collapses and dies, so the truth remains forever hidden and the happiness of the girl who has been kind to him is assured.

== Cast ==
- Betty Compson as Peggy Bowlin
- Richard Dix as Larry Darrant
- Lewis Stone as Keith Darrant
- Tully Marshall as The Stranger
- Robert Schable as Jim Walenn
- Mary Jane Irving as Maizie Darrant
- Frank Nelson as Jackal / Bill Cutts
- Marian Skinner as Landlady

== Preservation ==
The Stranger is currently presumed lost. In February of 2021, the film was cited by the National Film Preservation Board on their Lost U.S. Silent Feature Films list.

== See also ==
- List of lost films
