= For Sale (1918 film) =

- Directed by: Fred E. Wright
- Screenplay by: Fred Jackson
- Starring: Gladys Hulette; Creighton Hale; Helene Chadwick; Lionel Atwill
- Cinematography: Albert Richard
- Production company: Pathé Exchange
- Release date: June 9, 1918
- Running time: 50 minutes
- Country: United States
- Language: Silent (English intertitles)

For Sale is a 1918 American silent drama film directed by Fred E. Wright and written by Fred Jackson. The film stars Gladys Hulette, Creighton Hale, Helene Chadwick, and Lionel Atwill. The film was released on June 9, 1918, by Pathé Exchange. It was a five reel film and lasted for 50 minutes. The film is considered lost.

== Cast ==
- Gladys Hulette as Dorothy Daniels
- Creighton Hale as Waverly Hamilton
- Helene Chadwick as Annie
- Lionel Atwill, unnamed role

== Plot ==
Dorothy Daniels, a stenographer, is in love with her co-worker, Waverly Hamilton, who is a clerk in the same office. Hamilton has lost all of his money on the stock market and has stolen money from his employer. He feigns illness to avoid detection of the theft, and gains sympathy from Dorothy, who successfully persuades their boss (portrayed by Atwill) to pay for a vacation for Hamilton to travel to Colorado where the climate might restore him to better health. Hamilton goes to Denver where he quickly loses money gambling in poker games, and has an affair with the girl Annie; all while pretending to care about Dorothy while on the phone with her and successfully persuading her to send him more money. Eventually all comes to light, and Dorothy is faced with a difficult choice.
