= Captain Jinks of the Horse Marines (film) =

- Directed by: Fred E. Wright
- Based on: the play by Clyde Fitch
- Produced by: Essanay Studios
- Starring: Ann Murdock
- Cinematography: Jackson Rose
- Production company: Essanay Pictures
- Distributed by: V-L-S-E
- Release date: January 17, 1916
- Running time: 5 reels
- Country: United States
- Languages: Silent; English titles

Captain Jinks of the Horse Marines is a lost 1916 silent film directed by Fred E. Wright and starring Ann Murdock. It is based on the 1901 play of the same name by Clyde Fitch which starred Ethel Barrymore. It was produced by the Essanay Studios in Chicago.

== Cast ==
- Richard Travers as Robert Carrolton Jinks
- Ann Murdock as Aurelia, Madame Trentoni
- John Junior as Gussie von Volkenburg
- Edmund Cobb as Charlie La Martine
- Camille D'Arcy as Mrs. Greenborough
- Laura Frankenfield as Mrs. Jinks
- Ernest Maupain as Professor Balliarti
- Bruce Kent as Pete, the bellboy
- Charles J. Stine as Band Leader
