= Billy Jim =

1922 film

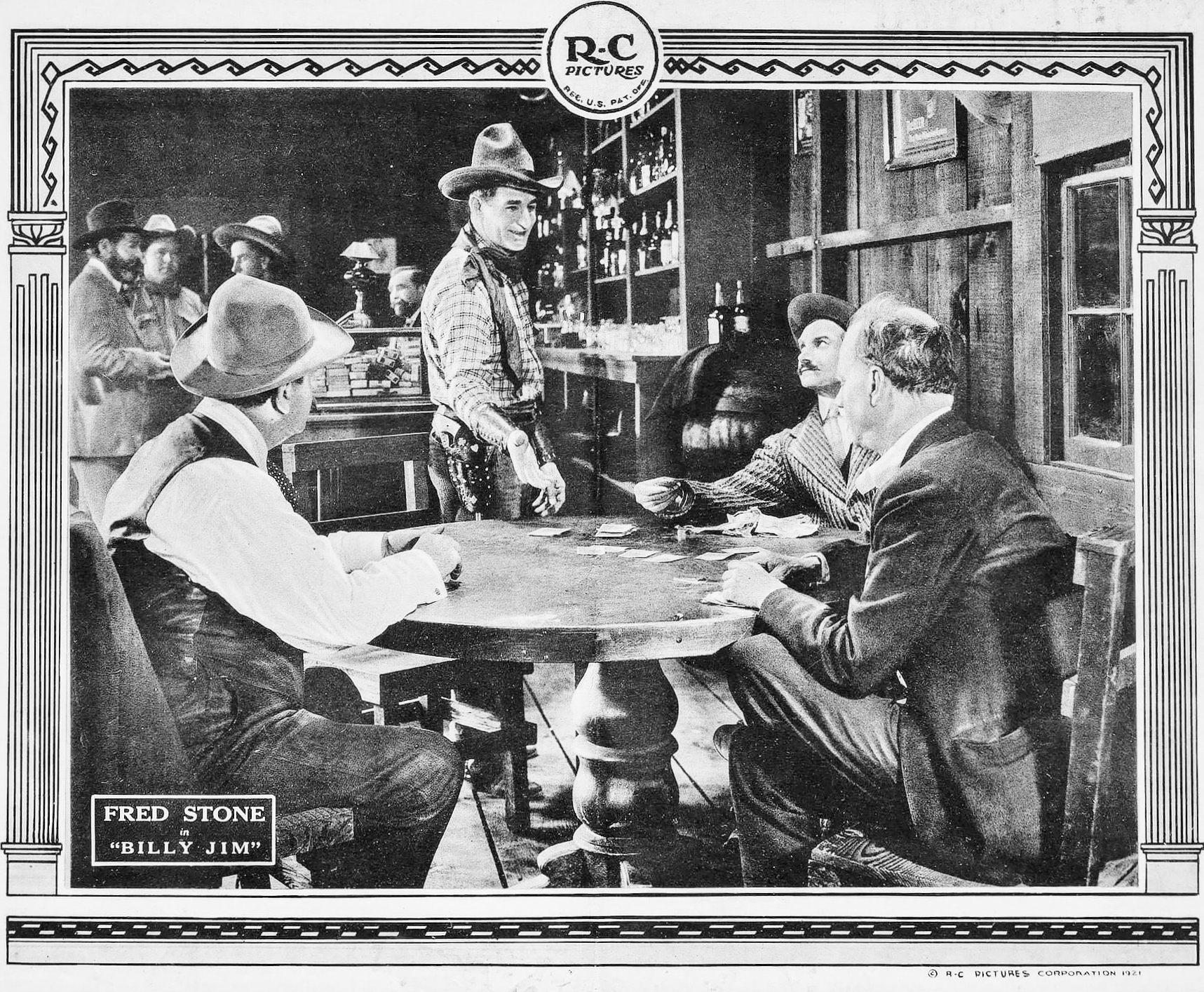
- Directed by: Frank Borzage
- Written by: Frank Howard Clark; Jackson Gregory
- Produced by: Andrew J. Callaghan
- Starring: Fred Stone; Marian Skinner; George Hernandez
- Production company: Fred Stone Productions
- Distributed by: Robertson-Cole Distributing Corporation
- Release date: January 29, 1922
- Running time: 51 minutes
- Country: United States
- Languages: Silent; English intertitles

Billy Jim is a 1922 American silent comedy western film directed by Frank Borzage and starring Fred Stone, Marian Skinner and George Hernandez.

== Plot ==
Billy Jim is a wealthy westerner posing as a happy-go-lucky cowboy. He boards a train and gets into an argument with a man. He meets a girl who berates him for his actions. However, he falls in love with her. Later, while drunk, he finds her bound to a chair in a cabin and after releasing her learns that she is traveling with her father to a resort. Billy Jim then robs some men playing a card game and hires a driver to take him to the girl's father's resort. He learns the resort is next to a mining camp, which the father also owns. The sheriff then arrives to arrest him for stealing money. It is revealed that he is a wealthy cattle owner. Billy Jim departs, but the girl follows to return his gun.

== Cast ==
- Fred Stone as Billy Jim
- Millicent Fisher as Marsha Dunforth
- George Hernandez as Dudley Dunforth
- Billy Bletcher as Jimmy
- Marian Skinner as Mrs. Dunforth
- Frank Thorne as Roy Forsythe

== Bibliography ==
- Munden, Kenneth White. The American Film Institute Catalog of Motion Pictures Produced in the United States, Part 1. University of California Press, 1997.
