= Sam H. Harris =

American theatre owner and producer

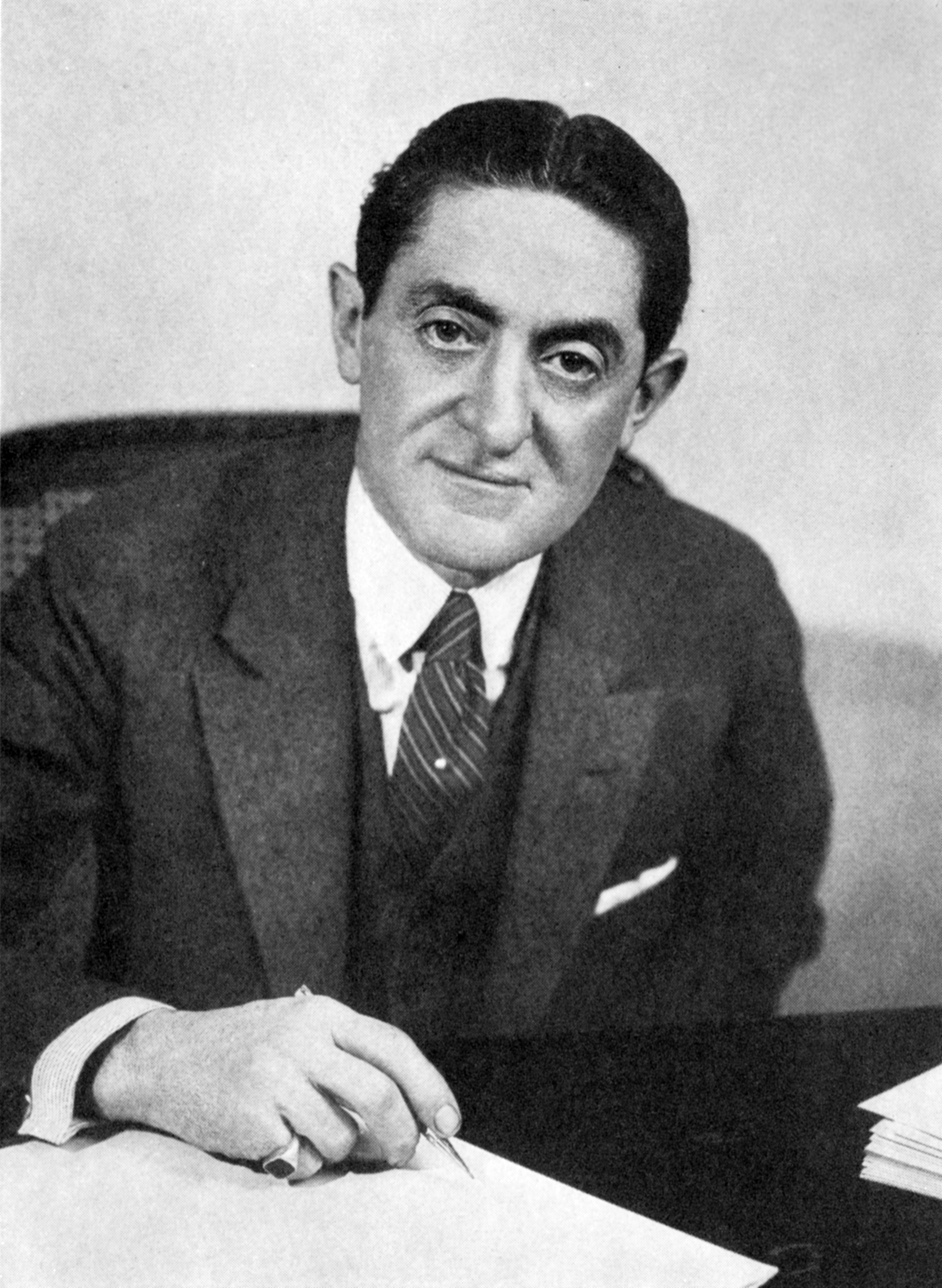
- Harris in 1928
- Born: Samuel Henry Harris; February 3, 1872; Manhattan, New York City, U.S.
- Died: July 3, 1941 (aged 69)
- Occupations: Broadway producer, theatre owner
- Years active: 1903–1941
- Known for: Producing George M. Cohan musicals; co-founder of the Music Box Theatre
- Spouse: Alice Nolan (m. 1908; died 1930)

Sam H. Harris (February 3, 1872 – July 3, 1941) was a Broadway producer and theater owner.

== Career ==
Samuel Henry Harris was born on Manhattan's Lower East Side to poor Jewish parents.

After a stint as a cough drop salesman and boxing manager, Harris's first production was Theodore Kremer's The Evil That Men Do, which he co-produced with Al Woods in 1903. Harris found success in 1904 as the producing partner of George M. Cohan, with whom he produced eighteen Broadway musicals, fifteen of which were Cohan's own. In 1908, Harris married Alice Nolan (1888 — 1930), sister of Cohan's second wife, Agnes.

From 1916 to 1919, most of these productions were in the Candler Theater on 42nd street, renamed the Cohan and Harris Theater in 1916.

Harris separated from Cohan after a 1919 actors strike, and renamed the theater the Sam H. Harris Theatre. He sold it in 1926 to the Shubert Organization, but it continued to operate under the Harris name for the next 68 years, even after it was converted to a movie house in 1933; the theater finally closed in 1994 and, except for its facade, was demolished in 1997.

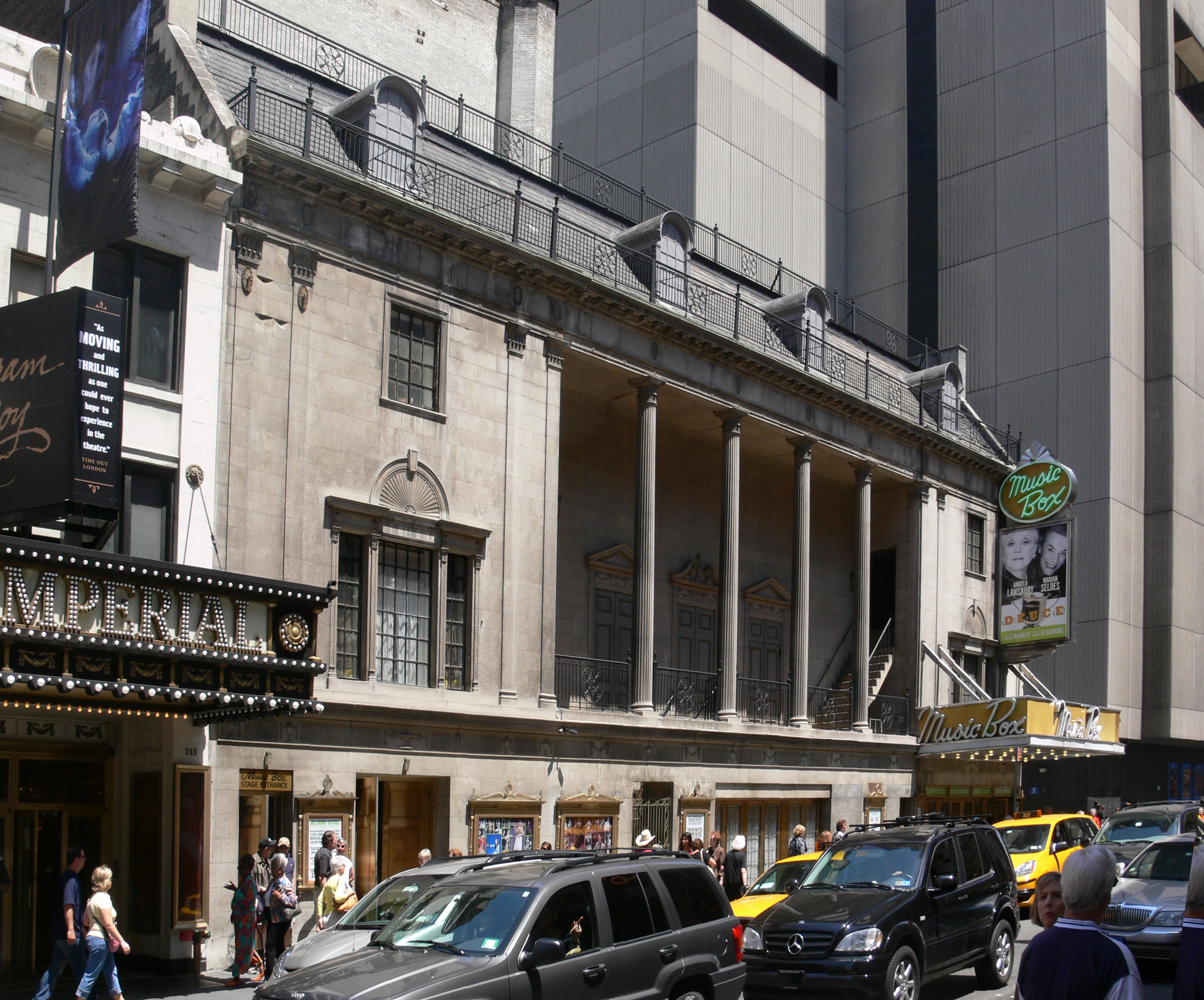
The Music Box Theatre

He proposed a musical revue to his friend Irving Berlin in 1919, and with him built the Music Box Theatre in 1921, specially for Berlin's Music Box Revue. His estate held an interest in the theater through 1960. On Harris's death, most shares in the theater were sold to Berlin and to the Shubert Organization.

Harris produced over 130 shows, including several of the biggest hits of the 1920s and 1930s. He was known for fairness to actors and writers amid the generally harsh treatment prevailing in the industry.

Harris was portrayed by Richard Whorf in the Academy Award-winning biopic, Yankee Doodle Dandy in 1942.

Weakened by an appendectomy, Harris died of pneumonia on July 3, 1941.

== Productions ==
Notable productions include:

- The Errand Boy (George Totten Smith, 1904)
- Little Johnny Jones (George M. Cohan, 1904)
- Broadway Jones (George M. Cohan, 1912)
- The Royal Vagabond (George M. Cohan, 1919)
- Music Box Reviews (Irving Berlin, 1921–1924)
- Rain (John Colton and Clemence Randolph, 1923)
- Red Light Annie (Norman Houston and Sam Forrest, 1923)
- The Cocoanuts (Irving Berlin, George S. Kaufman, Morrie Ryskind, 1925)
- Stage Door (Edna Ferber and George S. Kaufman, 1926)
- Animal Crackers (Bert Kalmar, Harry Ruby, George S. Kaufman, Morrie Ryskind, 1928)
- Once in a Lifetime (Moss Hart and George S. Kaufman, 1930)
- Of Thee I Sing (George and Ira Gershwin, 1931)
- Dinner at Eight (Ferber and Kaufman, 1932)
- Jubilee (Cole Porter and Moss Hart, 1935)
- You Can't Take It with You (Kaufman and Hart, 1936)
- I'd Rather Be Right (Rodgers and Hart, 1937)
- The Man Who Came To Dinner (Kaufman and Hart, 1939)
- Lady in the Dark (Kurt Weill and Ira Gershwin, 1941)
