= Camille D'Arcy =

American actress

- Born: c.1879
- Died: September 26, 1916 (aged 37); Chicago, Illinois
- Other name: Mrs. Loren Wilder
- Occupation: actress
- Years active: 1915–1916
- Spouse: Loren Wilder

Camille D'Arcy (1879 – September 26, 1916) was an American stage and silent film actress. In film she played matronly or character roles; all of her film appearances were with the Essanay Company of Chicago. In private life she was married to Dr. Loren Wilder. In the fall of 1916 she went swimming in Lake Michigan, caught an infection and died at age 37 in Chicago.

== Filmography ==
- Third Hand High (1915)*short
- The Strength of the Weak (1915)*short
- The Fable of the Galumptious Girl (1915)*short
- The Snow-Burner (1915)*short
- The White Sister (1915)
- The Cave on Thunder Cloud (1915)*short
- Mind Over Motor (1915)*short
- Tish's Spy (1915)*short
- The Circular Path (1915)*short
- The Reaping (1915)*short
- The Fable of the Escape of Arthur and the Salvation of Herbert (1915)*short
- The Fable of the Low Down Expert on the Subject of Babies (1915)*short
- A Daughter of the City (1915)
- Captain Jinks of the Horse Marines (1916)
- Beyond the Law (1916)*short
- Putting it Over (1916)*short
- The Grouch (1916)*short
- The Prince Chap (1916)
- The Pacifist (1916)*short
