= Warda Howard =

American actress (1880–1943)

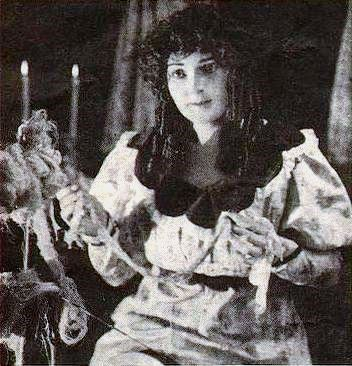
- Warda Howard in The Raven (1915)
- Born: 1880; San Francisco, California, U.S.
- Died: March 17, 1943 (aged 62–63)
- Occupation: Actress
- Spouse(s): Frank Fanning (m. 1907) John Lorenz; Leo Kennedy

Eduarda Howard (1880–March 17, 1943), better known by her stage names Teddy Howard and Warda Howard, was an American actress on stage and screen. Her stage career included an extended tour through Asia and the Pacific performing with the company of New Zealand actor Reynolds Denniston.

She was in films for V-L-S-E, a distributor formed by Vitagraph Company of America, Lubin Manufacturing Company, Selig Polyscope Company, and Essanay Film Manufacturing Company.

== Personal life ==
Howard was born in San Francisco in 1880 as the daughter of Charles and Louise Howard. Her father was on the faculty of the University of California, Berkeley, which she also attended.

She married actor Frank Fanning in 1907. She had subsequent marriages to actors John Lorenz and Leo Kennedy.

== Fimography ==
- The Longer Voyage (1915, a leading role with Sydney Ainsworth)
- The Raven (1915)
- That Sort (1916), as Diana Laska, a starring role
- The Little Girl Next Door (1916)

== Theater ==
- Next (1911) as Sage Brush Kate
- Red Light Annie (1923) as Dorothy Martin
- The Desert Flower (1924) as Flo Zella
- Too Much Party (1934) as Hagar
