= Red Light Annie =

Play by Norman Houston and Sam Forrest

- Original language: English
- Written by: Norman Houston and Sam Forrest
- Genre: Melodrama

Premiere
- Date: August 21, 1923
- Place: Morosco Theatre

Red Light Annie is a 1923 play written by Norman Houston and Sam Forrest. Producers Sam H. Harris and Albert H. Woods staged it on Broadway. It is a melodrama about a young couple who move to New York City and are pulled into a world of drugs and crime.

== Plot ==
Tom and Fanny Campbell move from a small town to New York City, where the only people they know are Fanny's stepsister and brother-in-law, Dorothy and Nick Martin. The Martins are criminals who frame Tom for theft. When Tom is sent to prison for three years, Fanny falls prey to cocaine addiction and becomes a prostitute. When Tom is released, Nick attempts to blackmail the Campbells, but Fanny kills him. A sympathetic detective helps her avoid a murder conviction.

== Productions ==
In previews, the play was called The Slavemaker. It appeared under this name in Baltimore in March 1923. After being renamed twice, first to Snow, then to Red Light Annie, the play opened on Broadway at the Morosco Theatre on August 21, 1923. It ran there until October, when it moved to the Eltinge 42nd Street Theatre. The Broadway production closed in early November, having run for 11 weeks with 87 performances.

== Original cast ==
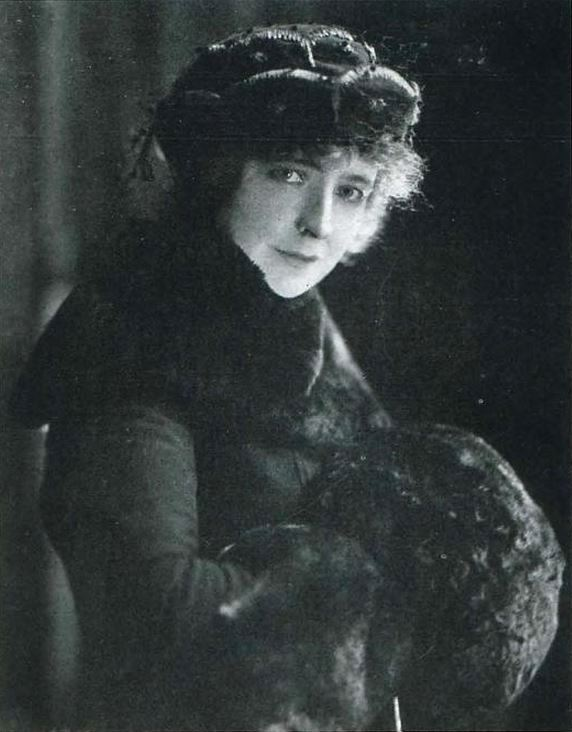
Mary Ryan played Fanny Campbell in the Broadway production.

Original Broadway cast
Character	Actor
Ned	Al Britton
A Man	Albert Carberry
Mr. Fulton	Francis Dunn
Nick Martin	Edward Ellis
Flo	Monita Gay
An Office Boy	Billy Gillen
A Judge	Harry Hammill
Dorothy Martin	Warda Howard
Marie	Ann Martin
Another Man	Fred McLean
Robert Dugan	Paul Nicholson
Mr. Wilson	W.H. Prendergast
Fanny Campbell	Mary Ryan
Tom Campbell	Frank M. Thomas
Chester	Henry Vincent
Al	John Waller
Mr. Clark	Edward Walton

== Dramatic analysis ==
The play's most unusual feature was the first act, which consisted of ten short scenes in quick succession, showing Tom and Fanny's transition from small-town innocents to degraded city dwellers. The second and third acts were more conventionally staged.
