= Graustark =

Fictional country in novels by George Barr McCutcheon

Principality of Graustark
- Graustark novels location
- First appearance: Graustark: The Story of a Love Behind a Throne
- Last appearance: The Inn of the Hawk and Raven
- Created by: George Barr McCutcheon
- Genre: Ruritanian romance

In-universe information
- Type: Principality
- Ruled by: Princess Yetive
- Locations: Edelweiss, Ganlook
- Language: Graustarkian
- Currency: gavvo

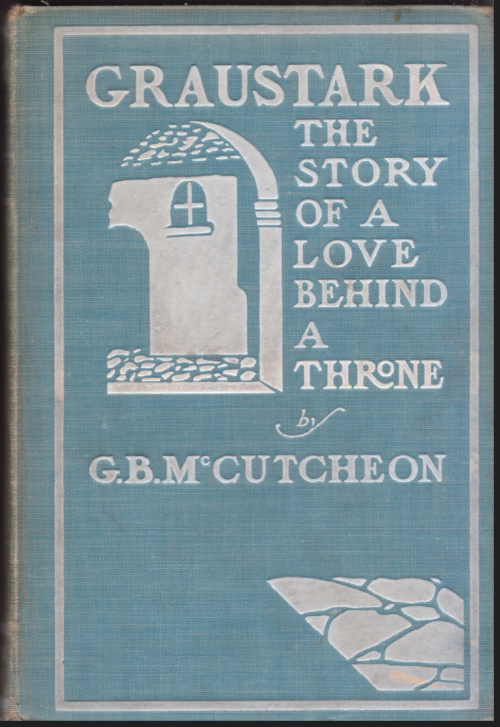
Cover of 1901 edition of Graustark

Graustark is a fictional country in Eastern Europe used as a setting for several novels by George Barr McCutcheon. Graustark's neighbors, which also figure in the stories, are Axphain to the north and Dawsbergen to the south.

== Description ==
Graustark is described as a mountainous country with an area of approximately 800 square miles (2,100 km^{2}) - for reference, the unclaimed territory of Bir Tawil has an area of 795 square miles. There is at least one reference in the books that fixes its location as somewhere in the Carpathian Mountains near Romania. On the other hand, in Graustark it is said to be threatened with reduction to being only 25 miles wide by 150 miles long (3750 square miles) - for reference, the land area of Lebanon is equivalent to 3,950 square miles - and in Truxton King is said to provide a shorter rail route to Russian territories in or near Afghanistan. Graustark's capital city, Edelweiss, is accessible by train from Vienna. The mountain town of Ganlook is near the border with Axphain, Graustark's traditional enemy.

Graustark is ruled as a principality and its unit of currency is called the gavvo, worth $1.40 at the time of the novel Truxton King. Graustarkian is the native language of the people, although American English is universally spoken among the educated classes and is the everyday language of the royal family and court.

== Novels ==
The Graustark novels are stories of court intrigue, royal disguise, and romance similar to Anthony Hope's 1894 novel, The Prisoner of Zenda, and its sequels. They were popular best-sellers at the time they were published and the original editions are still readily available in used book shops. The two authors' novels gave their name to a fictional genre called either Ruritanian romance based on The Prisoner of Zenda, or "Graustarkian," from McCutcheon's novels. This genre contains tales of romance and intrigue usually featuring titled characters in small, fictional, Central European or East European countries.

The novels in McCutcheon's series are:

- "Graustark: The Story of a Love Behind a Throne". onlinebooks.library.upenn.edu. 1901.
- Beverly of Graustark (1904) Gutenberg text (filmed in 1926 with Marion Davies)
- Truxton King: A Story of Graustark (1909) Gutenberg etext in HTML
- "The Prince of Graustark". onlinebooks.library.upenn.edu. 1914.
- East of the Setting Sun (1924) Hathitrust catalog record
- The Inn of the Hawk and Raven (1927) archive.org

== History of Graustark ==
During the 1870s, Graustark's ruler, Prince Ganlook of Graustark, was killed in a war with neighboring Axphain. As part of the ensuing peace treaty, Graustark agreed to pay a large indemnity to Axphain, to be due, with interest, in fifteen years.

Graustark found itself without the resources to pay the indemnity when it was due, and in desperation, Princess Yetive, Ganlook's daughter and successor, was on the verge of contracting a state marriage to Prince Lorenz of Axphain in exchange for more favorable payment terms. But before the marriage could take place, Lorenz was murdered. The princess's true love, the American Grenfall Lorry, whom she had met while travelling in the United States, appeared to be the murderer. Lorenz's father insisted on the murderer's punishment, but the execution was prevented by the revelation of the true murderer: the villainous Prince Gabriel, ruler of Dawsbergen, who was another of Yetive's suitors. With Lorenz dead and Gabriel imprisoned, Yetive instead married her true love.

During Gabriel's imprisonment, Dawsbergen was ruled by his younger half-brother, Prince Dantan, a popular figure among his own people and a staunch friend of Graustark as well. But after two years, Gabriel escaped from prison and, supported by the Dawsbergen army, returned to the throne. Dantan was forced to go into hiding in disguise in Graustark. For a time it appeared that Graustark might be forced into war with both Dawsbergen and Axphain, but this was averted when Gabriel was recaptured. Meanwhile, the disguised Prince Dantan had fallen in love with Beverly Calhoun, an American guest of the Lorrys; they were married upon his restoration to the throne of Dawsbergen.

Yetive and her husband were tragically killed in a railway accident near Brussels, leaving their young son Prince Robin as ruler of Graustark. While still a child, Robin was the target of an assassination plot by anarchists acting under the direction of the exiled Count Marlanx, whose ultimate goal was to establish himself as sole dictator of Graustark. But the assassination attempt was foiled by the intervention of the American Truxton King, and Marlanx was killed in the ensuing attack on the royal palace.

Graustark was still in financial difficulties by the time Prince Robin reached adulthood. William W. Blithers, a very rich and very vulgar American, offered to finance the country in the hopes of arranging a marriage between Robin and his own daughter. The two principals, however, had very different ideas of their own about marriage. Robin eventually married Bevra, the Crown Princess of Dawsbergen, daughter of Dantan and Beverly.

Graustark's debts eventually ended up being held by Russia. In exchange for entering World War I as Russia's ally, Graustark negotiated cancellation of this debt. Later, with Russia out of the war, Graustark also negotiated a separate peace. There followed a period of prosperity in the country.

Axphain, however, was taken over by communists after the war, and was in a state of much distress and unrest. Its ruler, Prince Hedrik (brother of Lorenz), and his elder son were murdered in the communist revolution, leaving the younger son Prince Hubert in exile in Graustark and an illegitimate son Gregory who lived with his mother in Italy. Hubert was hoping to marry Princess Virginia of Dawsbergen, Bevra's younger sister, but she had previously contracted a marriage of convenience to Pendennis Yorke, an American journalist, and much to the surprise of everyone it became a genuine love match. The communist regime in Axphain was defeated after an unsuccessful attempt to invade Graustark, and the monarchy in that country was restored with Gregory on the throne rather than the unpopular Hubert, who was himself assassinated in the aftermath.

In the fantasy novel Three Hearts and Three Lions (1961) by Poul Anderson, the hero Holger Carlsen gives his hastily constructed alias as 'Sir Rupert of Graustark.'

== On film ==
- Graustark (1915)
- The Prince of Graustark was made as a film in 1916 at the Chicago Essanay Studios, and is of note because it is claimed that Colleen Moore has a quick, uncredited role as a maid in the background of one scene. Some historians, viewing the scene, are convinced the girl is Moore. Others have seen stills of the scene and do not see the resemblance at all. As such, this is not considered to be one of her film roles, though she did spend some summers in Chicago growing up, and could easily have been an extra in this film.
- Truxton King (1923)
- Graustark (1925)
- Beverly of Graustark (1926)

== See also ==
- George Barr McCutcheon
