= The White Sister (1915 film) =

1915 film by Fred E. Wright

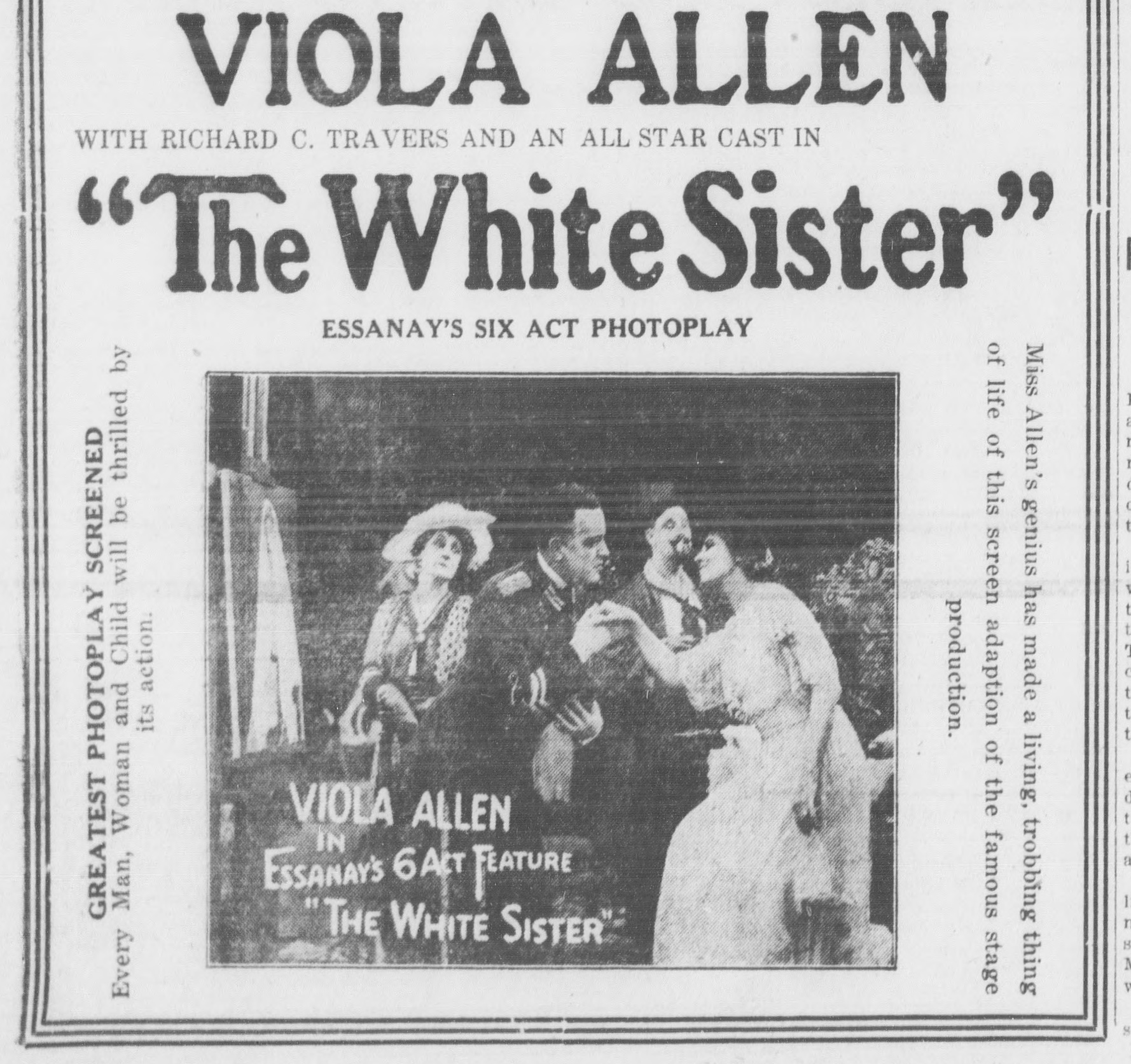
- Newspaper advertisement
- Directed by: Fred E. Wright
- Based on: The White Sister; 1909 play by F. Marion Crawford; Walter Hackett
- Produced by: Essanay Film Manufacturing Company (Essanay Studios)
- Starring: Viola Allen
- Cinematography: Rudolph J. Bergquist
- Distributed by: V-L-S-E
- Release date: June 15, 1915
- Running time: 6 reels
- Country: United States
- Language: Silent (English intertitles)

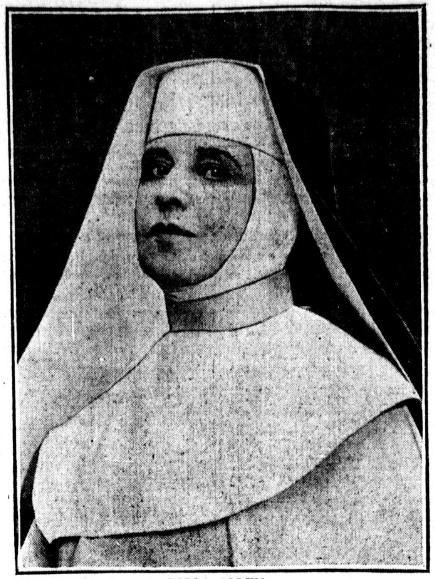
Viola Allen, the well-known stage star, as she appeared in "The White Sister."

The White Sister is a 1915 American silent film produced by Essanay Studios. It is based on the 1909 play The White Sister by F. Marion Crawford and Walter Hackett. This film, directed by Fred E. Wright, stars Viola Allen, a prominent stage actress in her first movie. Allen had also created the role in the play and it was one of her biggest successes. It is not known whether the film survives.

== Cast ==
- Viola Allen – Donna Angela Chiaramonte
- Richard C. Travers – Lt. Giovanni Severi
- Florence Oberle – Princess Chiaramonte
- Thomas Commerford – Monseigneur Saracinesca
- Emilie Melville – Mother Superior (aka Emelie Melville)
- John Thorn – Filmore Durand
- Sidney Ainsworth – Captain Ugo Severi (*Sydney Ainsworth)
- Ernest Maupain – Dr. Pieri
- Camille D'Arcy – Madame Bernard
- John H. Cossar – Minister of War (*aka John Cossar)
- Frank Dayton – Colonel Parlo
