= The White Sister (1933 film) =

1933 film by Victor Fleming

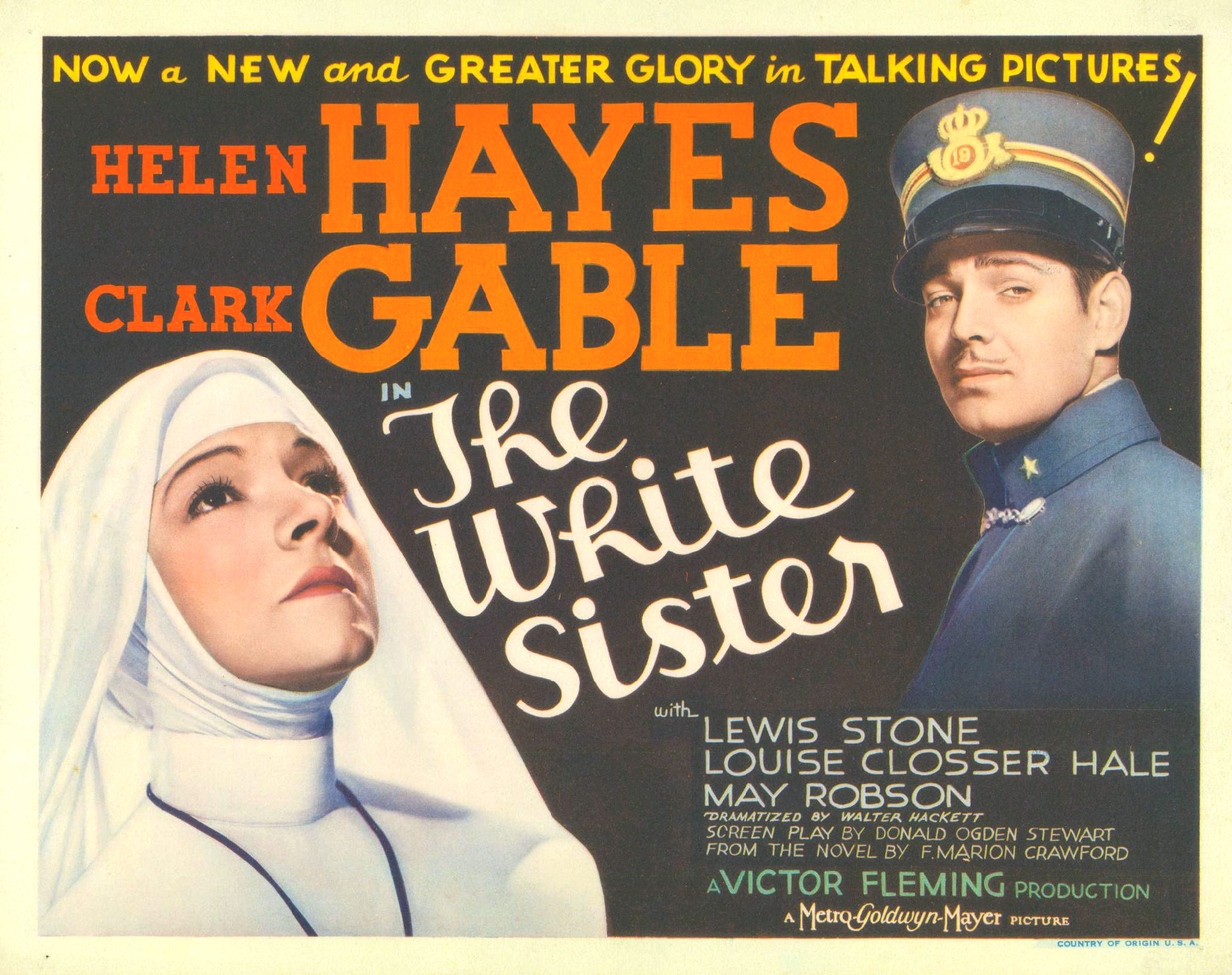
- Lobby card
- Directed by: Victor Fleming; Cullen Tate
- Screenplay by: Donald Ogden Stewart
- Based on: The White Sister; 1909 play by F. Marion Crawford; Walter Hackett
- Produced by: Hunt Stromberg
- Starring: Helen Hayes; Clark Gable; Lewis Stone
- Cinematography: William H. Daniels
- Edited by: Margaret Booth
- Music by: Herbert Stothart
- Production company: Metro-Goldwyn-Mayer
- Distributed by: Loew's Inc.
- Release date: April 14, 1933
- Running time: 105 minutes
- Country: United States
- Language: English / German
- Budget: $625,000
- Box office: $1.67 million

The White Sister is a 1933 American pre-Code romantic drama film directed by Victor Fleming and starring Helen Hayes and Clark Gable. It was based on the 1909 play of the same name by Francis Marion Crawford and Walter Hackett. It was a remake of the silent film The White Sister (1923).

== Plot ==
The banns are called for the third time for the marriage of Italian Princess Angela Chiaromonte and the husband chosen by her father, Ernesto Traversi. Driving home through streets filled with revelers celebrating a saint's feast day, their limousine is rear-ended by a car full of officers, driven by Giovanni Severi, a handsome army lieutenant. Traversi, the son of a banker, is 31, rather stuffy, preoccupied with business. Angela is a warm-hearted, impulsive, romantic, innocent young woman, who dreams every night of a handsome man she has never met. Angela persuades her duenna, Mina, to go outside to the Carnival, where they admire the antics of a pantomime horse. The horse approaches Angela, and she asks its name. “Giovanni” it replies, in the voice of the handsome lieutenant, and the horse—or rather the front half—follows Angela through the crowd while Mina is swept away by the revelers. Giovanni seats Angela in a quiet restaurant where they have tea and talk for hours. He tells her he loves her and sees her home, filling her arms with flowers.

Giovanni and his Colonel come to a ball given by Prince Chiaromonte. In the garden, Giovanni and Angela kiss for the first time; her father interrupts them. Giovanni declares that he wants to marry her and is forced to leave. Angela tells her father that the kiss revealed to her how much she loves Giovanni; now she knows, she cannot marry a man she does not love.

Angela runs away to Giovanni. Her father pursues her and, in a freak accident, their cars collide and her father is killed. Angela disappears, but Father Saracinesca gives Giovanni her address. He comes to her but, wracked by grief and guilt, she sends him away. Italy joins the War, and Giovanni comes to say goodbye. She gives him the cross she wears around her neck, for luck. He gives her an ivory whistle.

Giovanni is shot down and officially declared dead. In fact, he has been taken in by a German woman who is half Italian. Angela tells Father Saracinesca that she will never marry anyone, and that she believes God wants her to serve him as a nun. At the convent, Angela receives her postulant's habit and learns that she will be trained as a nurse. Her first lesson is never to use the word “mine.”

Meanwhile, Giovanni leaves his refuge. When he is finally captured, he gives a false name. In the prison camp, there is no way to get word out. Two years later, Giovanni emerges from a long session in solitary confinement to find an epidemic of cholera in the camp. He takes the place of a corpse, steals a plane and flies off into the night. Angela takes her final vows as a bride of Christ.

Home again and finding no trace of Angela, Giovanni goes looking for Father Saracinesca at the hospital. The nun who comes out to help him is Angela. She swoons and he catches her in his arms; they almost kiss, but she flees into the convent in horror. She prays for strength and eventually comes out to him. Their conversation is agonizing: She can't speak and says goodbye. Later Angela is sent out to a villa to help a patient, who turns out to be Giovanni. He implores her to give up the order, but she refuses. He tells her she can petition the Cardinal but she holds by her vows. He embraces her, but an air-raid breaks a window and shrouds the room in darkness. He finds Angela kneeling in prayer, repeating her vow. He takes her back to the convent. She says she will remember him and pray for him always.

Later, at the hospital, Father Saracinesca brings her to Giovanni's bedside. His plane crashed. He tells her “I'll be waiting,” and dies, holding the little cross she gave him when he went off to war.

== Cast ==
- Helen Hayes as Angela Chiaromonte
- Clark Gable as Giovanni Severi
- Lewis Stone as Prince Guido Chiaromonte
- Louise Closser Hale as Mina Bernardo
- May Robson as Mother Superior
- Edward Arnold as Father Saracinesca
- Alan Edwards as Ernesto Traversi

== Production ==
Aerial sequences combined stock footage and newly shot photography over the Sierra Nevada mountain range.

Principal photography on The White Sister began in December 1932 with two units assigned to the production. Director Fleming completed all of the interiors and backlot sequences at the Metro-Goldwyn-Mayer studios at Culver City, California. Second unit director Cullen Tate was in charge of all the aerial sequences filmed in Reno, Nevada. Aerial coordinator Paul Mantz gathered all the aircraft required: Stearman C3, Curtiss Fledgling and Travel Air J-5 biplanes, leased from the Los Angeles area. All the aircraft were repainted to stand in as Italian and German fighters. (Note: Scenes from Hell's Angels (1930) were integrated into the final film.)

== Reception ==
The White Sister generally received favorable reviews, with Variety saying, "Helen Hayes is the sorrowing Angela, as solid and satisfying a bit of acting as comes to the screen in a blue moon. Clark Gable is a gallant soldier hero and leaves nothing to be desired." Reviewer Mordaunt Hall of The New York Times reflected, "It is a beautiful production, but its scenes never seem as real as those of the old mute work."

== Box office ==
According to MGM records, the film earned $750,000 in the United States and Canada and $922,000 elsewhere, resulting in a profit of $456,000.
