= Marian Skinner =

American actress

- Born: January 8, 1880; New York, New York, US
- Died: June 7, 1963 (aged 83); San Francisco, California, US
- Occupation: Actress
- Years active: 1915–1924

Marian Skinner (January 8, 1880 – June 7, 1963) was an American film actress of the silent era. She appeared in more than 50 films between 1915 and 1924. She was born in New York, New York, and died in San Francisco, California.

== Selected filmography ==
- That Sort (1916)
- Sherlock Holmes (1916)
- On Trial (1917)
- Skinner's Dress Suit (1917)
- Skinner's Bubble (1917)
- Which Woman? (1918)
- Gambling in Souls (1919)
- The Amateur Adventuress (1919)
- The Spitfire of Seville (1919)
- A Rogue's Romance (1919)
- The Woman Under Cover (1919)
- The Sleeping Lion (1919)
- Dangerous to Men (1920)
- The House of Toys (1920)
- The Breath of the Gods (1920)
- Billions (1920)
- The Dangerous Moment (1921)
- White and Unmarried (1921)
- Brewster's Millions (1921)
- Morals (1921)
- Billy Jim (1922)
- The Stranger (1924)
