= Viola Allen =

American actress

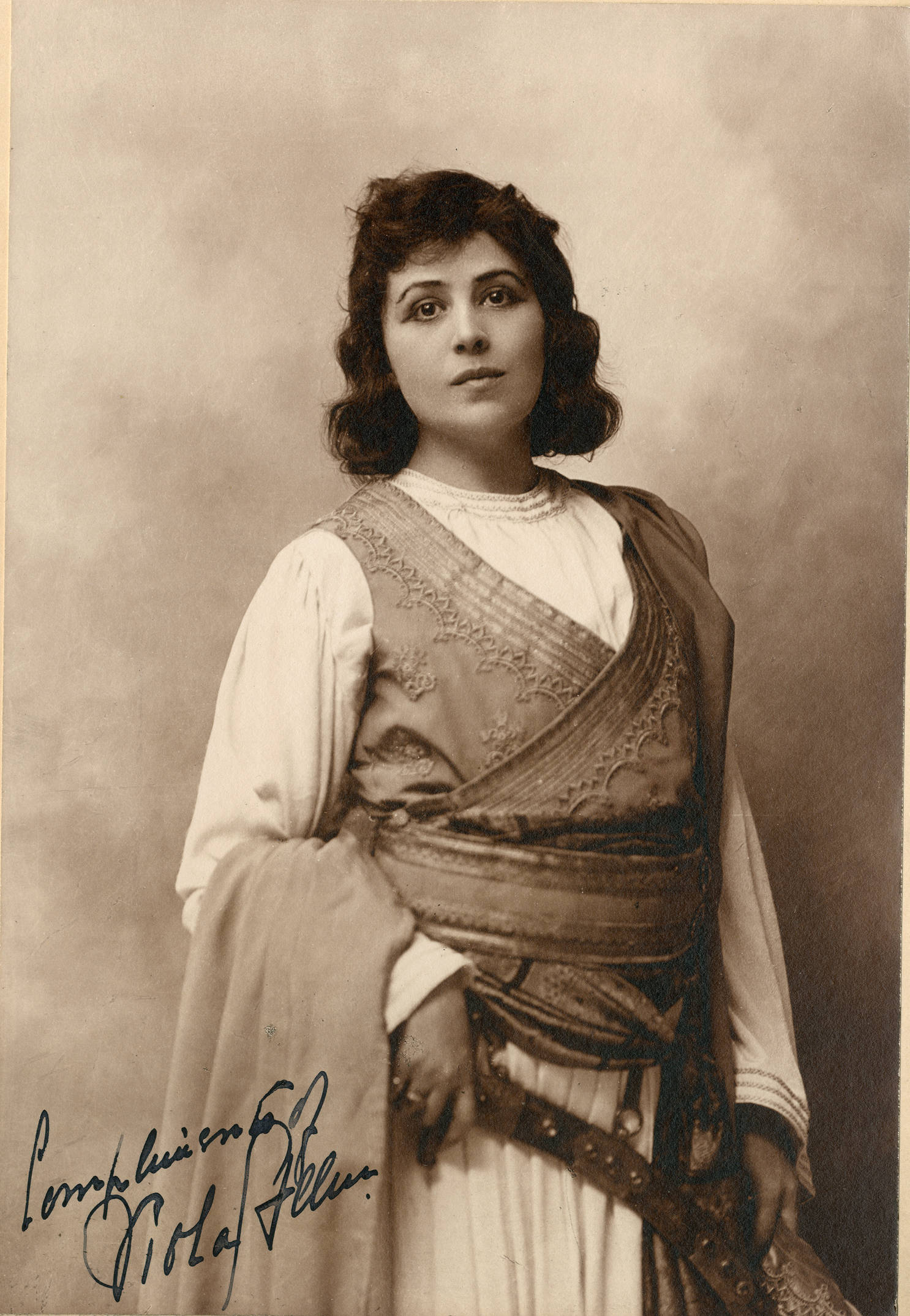
- Allen in 1907
- Born: Viola Emily Allen; October 27, 1867; Huntsville, Alabama, U.S.
- Died: May 9, 1948 (aged 80); New York City, U.S.
- Occupation: Actress
- Years active: 1882–1919
- Spouse: Peter Edward Cornell Duryea (m. 1905; died 1944)

Viola Emily Allen (October 27, 1867 – May 9, 1948) was an American stage actress who played leading roles in Shakespeare and other plays, including many original plays. She starred in over two dozen Broadway productions from 1885 to 1916. Beginning in 1915, she appeared in three silent films.

== Biography ==
Allen was born in Huntsville, Alabama, on October 27, 1867, (some sources say 1869), the daughter of actors Charles Leslie Allen and Sarah Jane Lyon. She moved to Boston at three years of age and later moved with her family to Toronto. She was educated at the Bishop Strachan School, her brothers being educated at Trinity College School, Port Hope, Ontario. She then attended a boarding school in New York City, Miss Cornell's School for Girls.

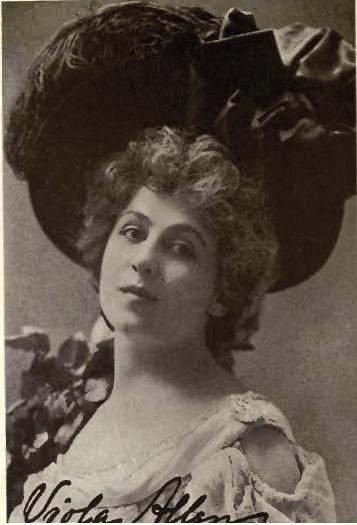
Allen, c. 1903

Allen had her first stage appearance at the age of 14 at Madison Square Theatre in New York on July 4, 1882. Annie Russell, who was playing the title role in Esmeralda, took ill at one point during the long run. Allen's father was a member of the cast, and the theater's stage manager asked if Mr. Allen would allow his daughter to play the part. Allen's debut attracted the attention of actor John McCullough, who made her his leading lady in 1883.

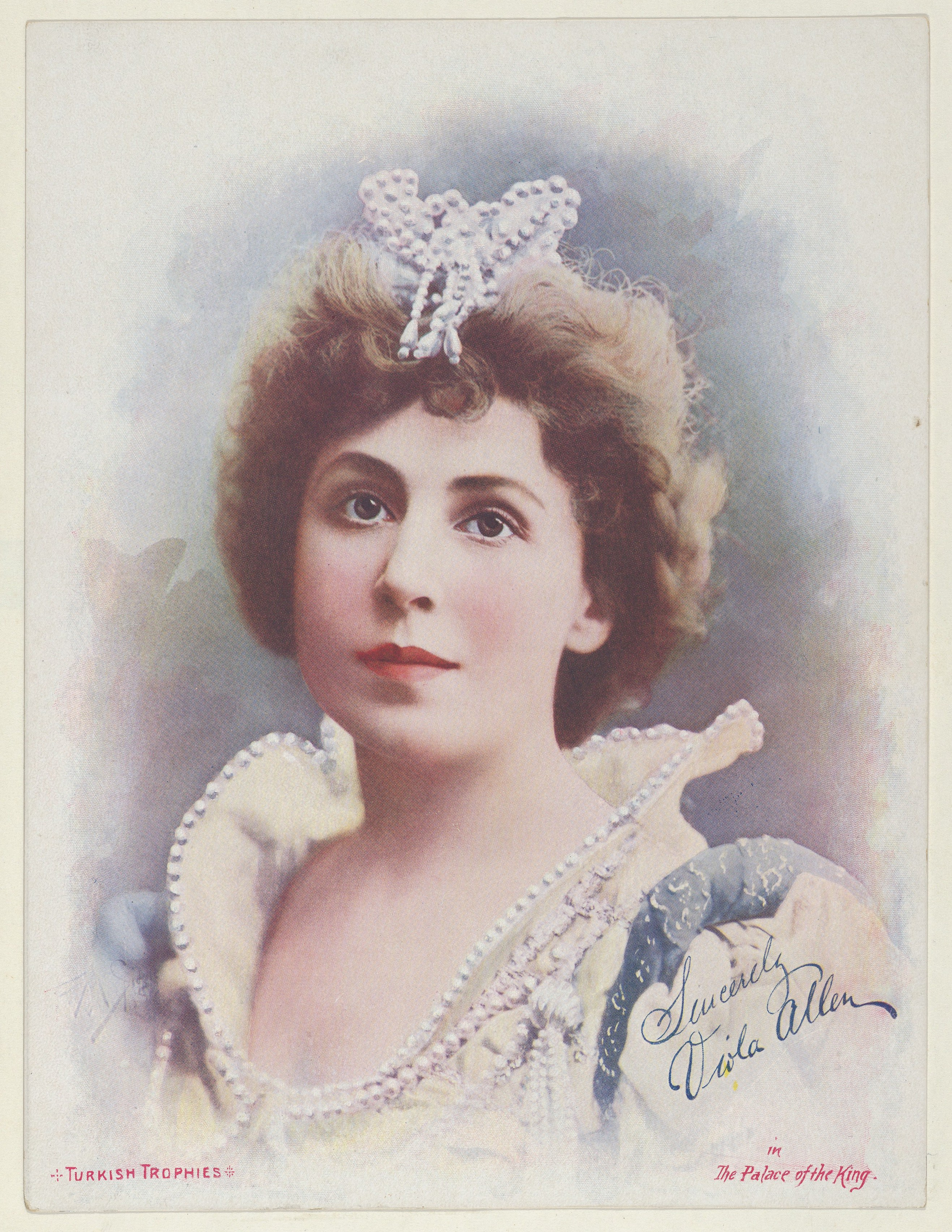
Viola Allen in the palace of the king (1900) by Frederick Moladore Spiegle

Between the years of 1884 and 1886, she performed in a variety of modern and Shakespearean plays. She performed with the best-known 19th century actors including: Tommaso Salvini, Lawrence Barrett, Joseph Jefferson, and William J. Florence. She is best remembered for her roles in Shenandoah (by Bronson Howard) and Little Lord Fauntleroy (by Frances Eliza Burnett). From 1885 to 1916, Allen starred in over two dozen Broadway productions, creating characters in many original plays. She played classical Shakesperean and comedy roles with Salvini, Lawrence Jarrett, Joseph Jefferson and V. J. Florence. In 1898, she created the character of Glory Quayle in Hall Caine's The Christian. She acted in The Masqueraders, Under the Red Robe, The Christian, In the Palace of the King (1900), Twelfth Night, A Winter's Tale, As You Like It, The Lady of Coventry (1911), and others. She played such roles as Virginia, Cordelia, Desdemona, Lydia Languish, Dolores, Julia and Roma.

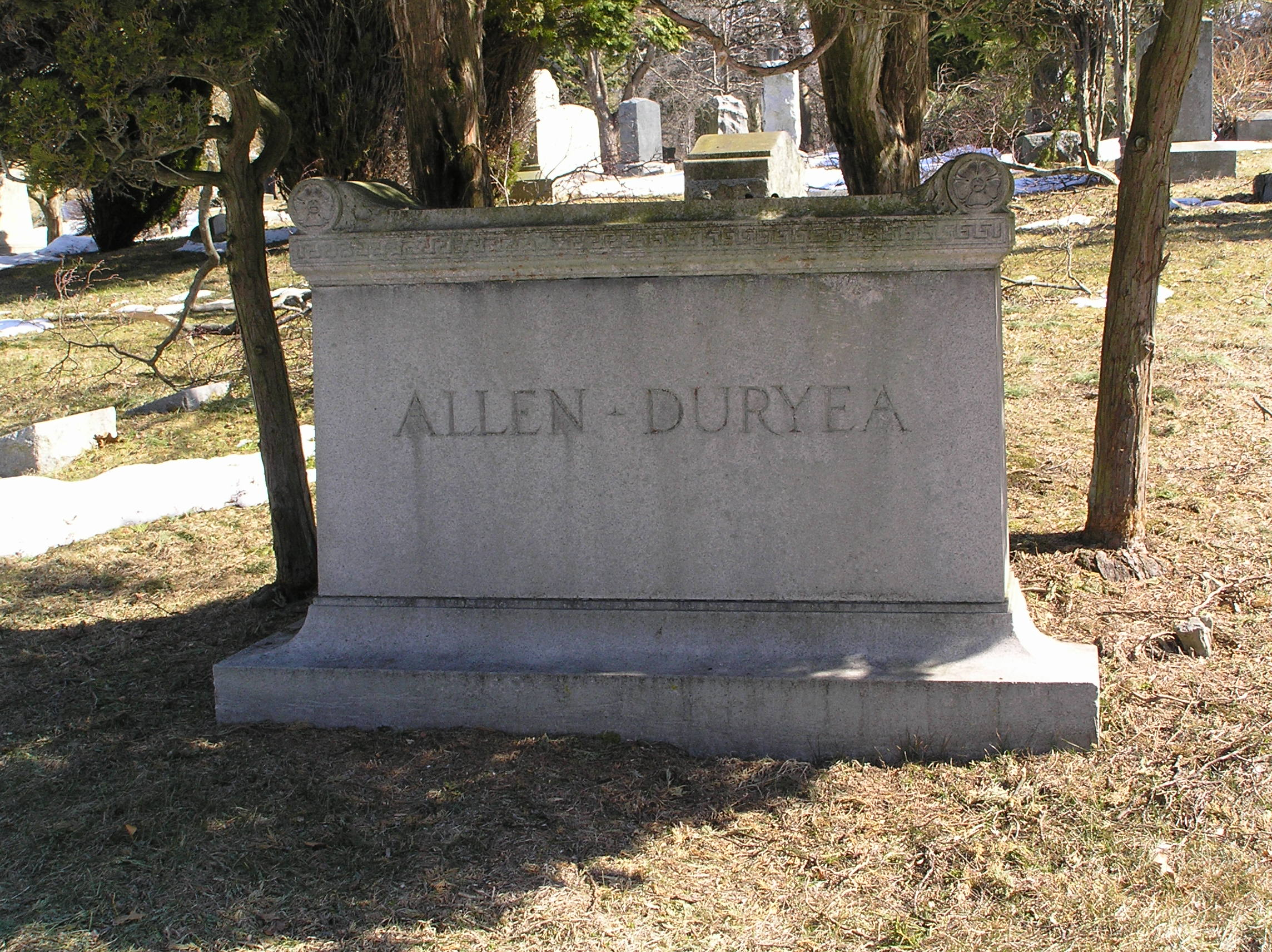
Allen's gravesite in New York

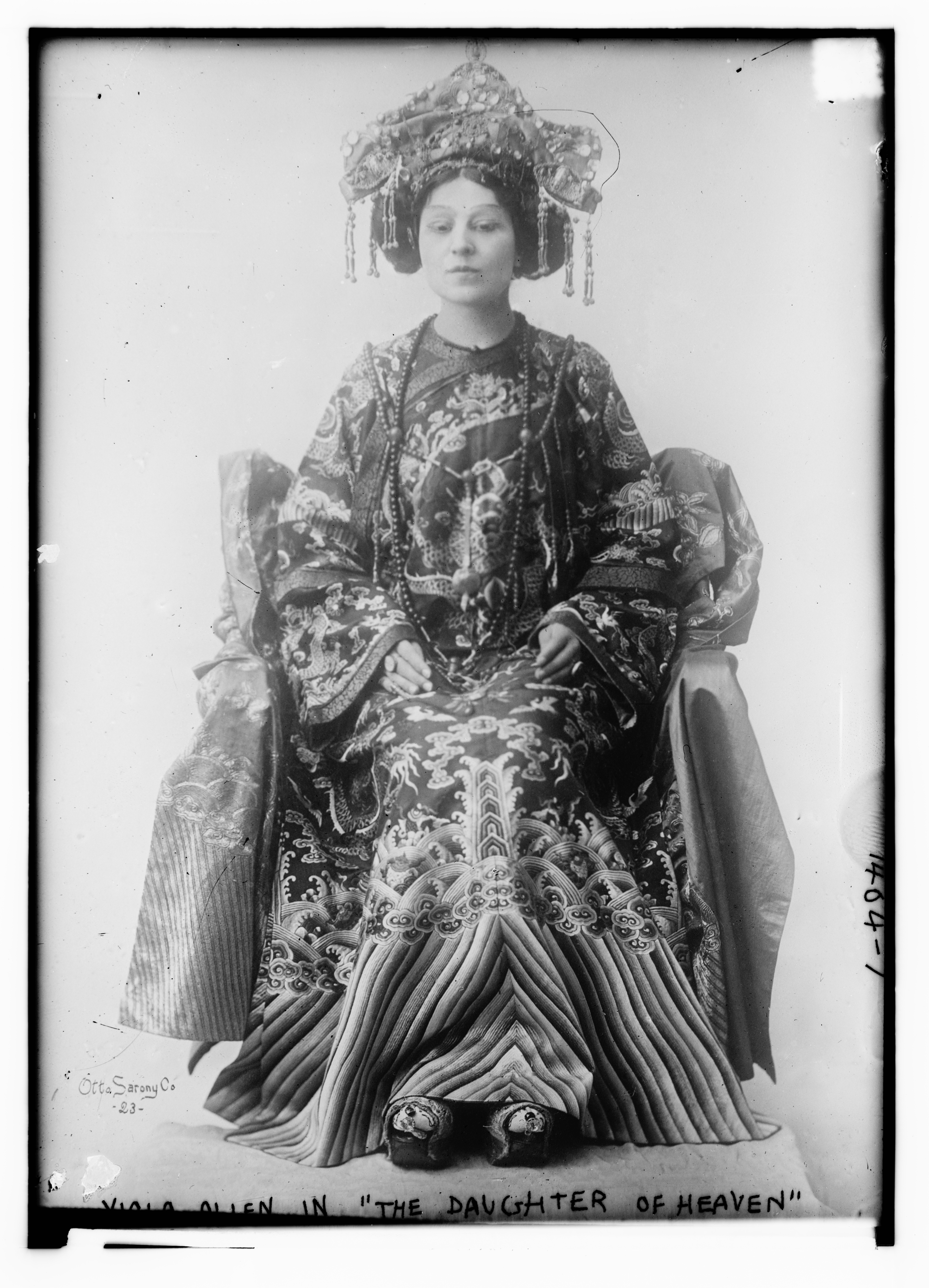
Allen in The Daughter of Heaven, a play by Pierre Loti and Judith Gautier, performed in 1912 at the Century Theatre in New York City

Allen starred in the 1915 silent film The White Sister along with Richard Travers. The film was produced by the Essanay Studios and was based on the 1909 play The White Sister that was a hit for Allen.

Her last professional appearance was in 1918, at a benefit supporting war relief. She remained an active supporter of charitable and theatrical organizations.

Allen married Peter Edward Cornell Duryea on August 16, 1905, and they remained wed until his death in 1944.

Allen died in her home in New York City on May 9, 1948, aged 78. She is buried in Sleepy Hollow Cemetery, Sleepy Hollow, New York.

== Filmography ==
- Getting Evidence (1907) short
- The Scales of Justice (1914)
- The White Sister (1915)
- Open Your Eyes (1919)
