= Truxton King (film) =

1923 film by Jerome Storm

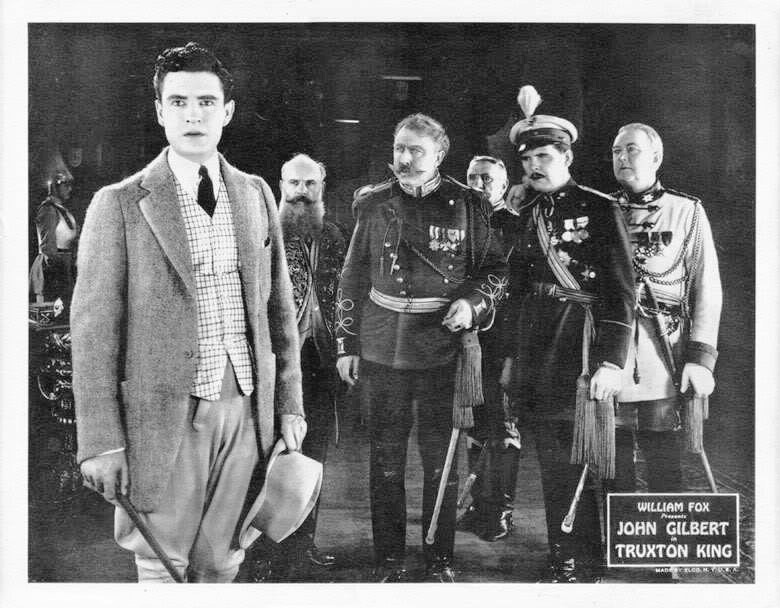
- Lobby card
- Directed by: Jerome Storm
- Written by: Paul Schofield
- Based on: Graustark by George Barr McCutcheon
- Produced by: William Fox
- Starring: John Gilbert
- Cinematography: Joseph H. August
- Distributed by: Fox Film Corporation
- Release date: February 18, 1923
- Running time: 60 minutes; 6 reels
- Country: United States
- Language: Silent (English intertitles)

Truxton King is a lost 1923 American silent drama film directed by Jerome Storm. The film stars John Gilbert while he was a player for Fox Film Corporation and is based upon the novel Graustark by George Barr McCutcheon.

== Plot ==
As described in a film magazine, looking for adventure, American Truxton King is visiting the eastern European country of Graustark. He accidentally enters the palace grounds and meets Prince Robin, who takes a liking to the stranger and shows him around. They meet his Aunt Lorraine who went to school with Truxton's sister. Prince Robin makes the American promise that he will meet him at the fortune teller's hut the next day. Truxton goes there and overhears a plot to assassinate the young heir. Truxton is made a prisoner but later escapes, also freeing Lorraine who was also captured. He returns in time to prevent the attempted assassination. The revolutionist then attacks the castle and Truxton goes for help. They arrive in time to save the Prince. Truxton realizes his love for Lorraine although, because of their different stations in society, he prepares to leave. Lorraine then tells him that she is an American, too, and consents to be his wife.

== Cast ==
- John Gilbert as Truxton King
- Ruth Clifford as Lorraine
- Frank Leigh as Count Marlaux
- Michael D. Moore as Prince Robin
- Otis Harlan as Hobbs
- Henry Miller, Jr. as Count Carlos Von Enge
- Richard Wayne as John Tullis
- Willis Marks as William Spanz
- Winifred Bryson as Olga Platanova
- Mark Fenton as Baron Dangloss
