= Ernest Maupain =

French actor (1869 - 1944)

- Born: 1 October 1869; Evreux, Eure, France
- Died: 25 October 1944 (aged 75); Neuilly-Plaisance, France
- Occupation: Actor
- Years active: 1911–1929 (film)

Ernest Maupain (1869–1944) was a French film actor who appeared in many American films during the silent era. He played the role of Professor Moriarty in the 1916 Essanay Studios film Sherlock Holmes.

== Selected filmography ==
- The Raven (1915)
- Captain Jinks of the Horse Marines (1916)
- Sherlock Holmes (1916)
- That Sort (1916)
- The Prince of Graustark (1916)
- Max Wants a Divorce (1917)
- The Trufflers (1917)
- The Turn of the Wheel (1918)
- Lafayette, We Come (1918)
- Face à l'Océan (1920)
- La folie du doute (1920)
- The Two Pigeons (1922)
- The Mysteries of Paris (1922)
- The Bread Peddler (1923)
- Le Miracle des loups (1924)
- The Chocolate Girl (1927)

== Bibliography ==
- Amnon Kabatchnik. Sherlock Holmes on the Stage: A Chronological Encyclopedia of Plays Featuring the Great Detective. Scarecrow Press, 2008.
