= The White Sister (1960 film) =

- Directed by: Tito Davison
- Written by: Edmundo Báez; Tito Davison
- Based on: The White Sister; 1909 play by F. Marion Crawford; Walter Hackett
- Produced by: Felipe Mier
- Starring: Jorge Mistral; Yolanda Varela; Prudencia Grifell
- Cinematography: Raúl Martínez Solares
- Edited by: Rafael Ceballos
- Music by: Luis Hernández Bretón
- Release date: 8 December 1960
- Running time: 90 minutes
- Country: Mexico
- Language: Spanish

The White Sister (Spanish:La hermana blanca) is a 1960 Mexican drama film directed by Tito Davison and starring Jorge Mistral, Yolanda Varela and Prudencia Grifell.

== Cast ==
- Jorge Mistral as Juan Escandón
- Yolanda Varela as Ángela
- Prudencia Grifell as Madame Bernard
- Andrea Palma as Madre superiora
- Augusto Benedico as Monseñor
- Manuel Arvide as General
- Alejandra Meyer as Lupe, sirvienta
- Aurora Walker as Tía de Ángela

== Bibliography ==
- Emilio García Riera. Historia documental del cine mexicano: 1959-1960. Universidad de Guadalajara, 1994.
