= Fred E. Wright (director) =

American film director

- Born: 1868; Catskill, New York, U.S.
- Died: August 5, 1936 (aged 67–68); Los Angeles, California, U.S.
- Occupation: director
- Years active: 1913-1918
- Spouse: Nell Craig

Fred E. Wright (1868 – August 5, 1936) was an American producer, scenarist, silent film director. He was born in Catskill, New York and died in Los Angeles, California. He was married to actress Nell Craig. Prior to entering silent films he was a producer on Broadway.

== Filmography ==
- The Clutch of Conscience (1913) – short
- Innocence (1913) – short
- The Escape (1913) – short
- The Sheriff's Reward (1913) – short
- The Engineer's Daughter (1913) – short
- The Italian Bride (1913) – short
- The Crooked Bankers (1913) – short
- Puttin' It Over on Papa (1913) – short
- A Redskin's Mercy (1913) – short
- What the Good Book Taught (1913) – short
- The Governor's Double (1913) – short
- The Outlaw's Love (1913) – short
- The Trapper's Mistake (1913) – short
- The Missionary's Triumph (1913) – short
- The Miner's Destiny (1913) – short
- The Call of the Blood (1913) – short
- The Price of Jealousy (1913) – short
- The Accidental Shot (1913) – short
- Her Brave Rescuer (1913) – short
- The Blind Gypsy (1913) – short
- Lillie's Nightmare (1913) – short
- The Depth of Hate (1913) – short
- Race Memories (1913) – short
- A Break for Freedom (1913) – short
- An Indian Don Juan (1913) – short
- Down Lone Gap Way (1914) – short
- Where the Heart Calls (1914) – short
- The Bond of Love (1914) – short
- Graustark (1915)
- The White Sister (1915)
- The Whirlpool (1915) – short
- In the Palace of the King (1915)
- The Second Son (1915) – short
- Captain Jinks of the Horse Marines (1916)
- The Little Shepherd of Bargain Row (1916)
- Power (1916) – short
- The War Bride of Plumville (1916) – short
- The Prince of Graustark (1916)
- The Breaker (1916)
- The Trufflers (1917)
- Be My Best Man (1917) – short
- The Man Who Was Afraid (1917)
- Star Dust (1917) – short
- The Fable of Prince Fortunatus, Who Moved Away from Easy Street, and Silas, the Saver, Who Movied In (1917) – short
- The Fibbers (1917)
- The Kill-Joy (1917)
- The Mysterious Client (1918)
- For Sale (1918)
