= The Lone Star Ranger (disambiguation) =

The Lone Star Ranger was a 1915 novel by Zane Grey:

The Lone Star Ranger may also refer to several films based on the novel:

- The Lone Star Ranger (1919 film), American silent film western directed by J. Gordon Edwards and starring William Farnum
- The Lone Star Ranger (1923 film), American silent film western directed by Lambert Hillyer and starring Tom Mix
- The Lone Star Ranger (1930 film), American western film directed by A.F. Erickson and starring George O'Brien
- Lone Star Ranger, a 1942 American western film directed by James Tinling and starring John Kimbrough

== Other uses ==
- Lone Star Ranger, a series of young adult western novels by James J. Griffin
- Lone Star Ranger, a stage name of singer John White (1902–1992)

== See also ==
- Lone Texas Ranger, a 1945 American Western film
- Lone Ranger, an iconic fictional character
- Last of the Duanes (disambiguation), original version of the story by Zane Gray and the title of several films, often featuring the same directors and cast members
