= Last of the Duanes =

Last of the Duanes may refer to:

- Last of the Duanes (novel), a novel written in 1913 by Zane Grey and published in its original form in 1996
- The Last of the Duanes (1919 film), an American film directed by J. Gordon Edwards
- The Last of the Duanes (1924 film), an American film directed by Lynn Reynolds
- The Last of the Duanes (1930 film), an American film directed by Alfred L. Werker
- Last of the Duanes (1941 film), an American film directed by James Tinling

== See also ==
- The Lone Star Ranger, novel by Zane Grey published in 1915 based in part on Last of the Duanes
