= The Lone Star Ranger (1930 film) =

1930 film

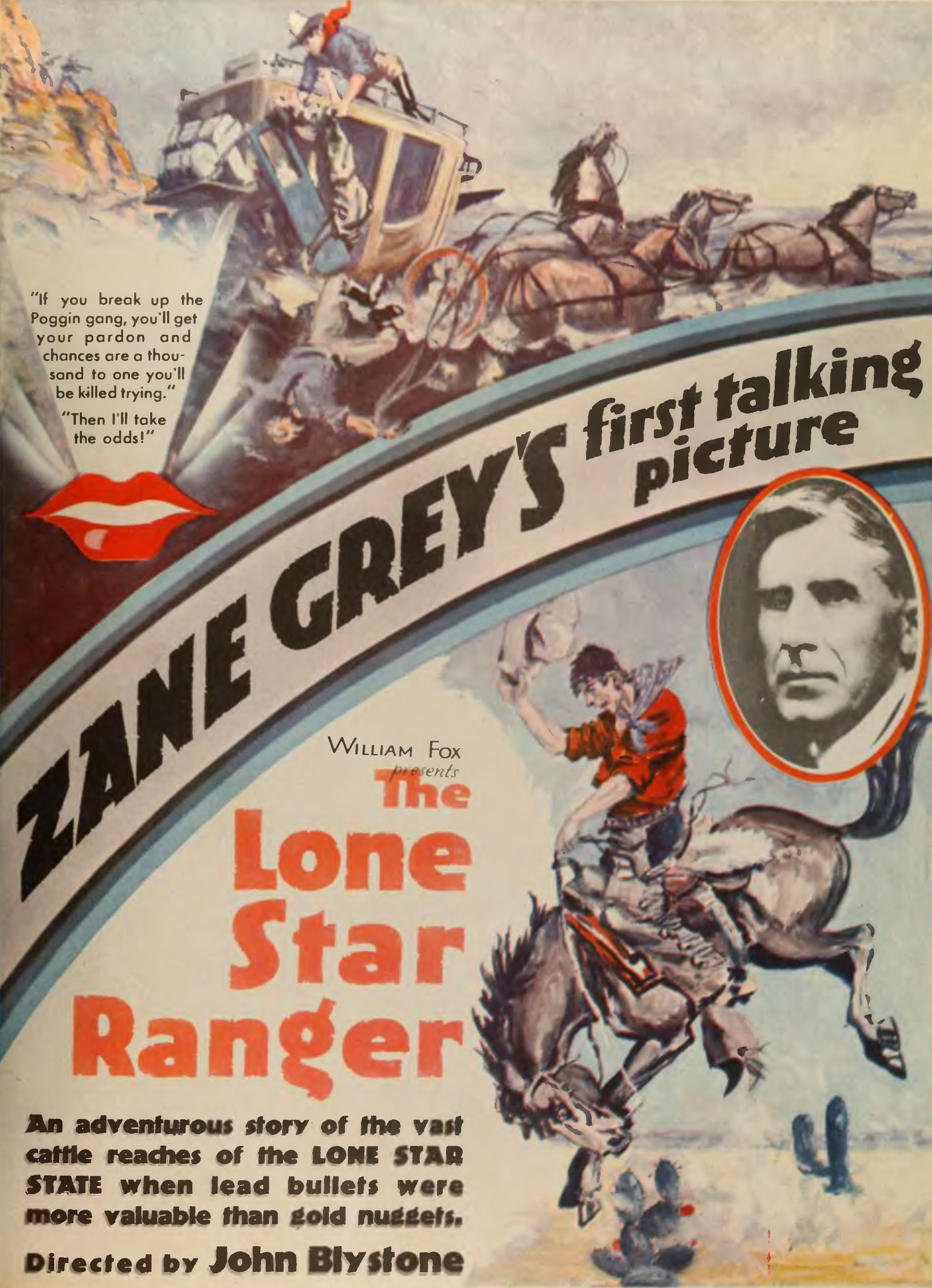
- Directed by: A.F. Erickson
- Screenplay by: Seton I. Miller; John Hunter Booth
- Based on: The Lone Star Ranger by Zane Grey
- Produced by: A.F. Erickson
- Starring: George O'Brien; Sue Carol; Walter McGrail; Warren Hymer; Russell Simpson; Roy Stewart
- Cinematography: Daniel B. Clark
- Edited by: Jack Murray
- Production company: Fox Film Corporation
- Distributed by: Fox Film Corporation
- Release date: January 5, 1930
- Running time: 64 minutes
- Country: United States
- Language: English

The Lone Star Ranger is a 1930 American pre-Code Western film directed by A.F. Erickson and written by Seton I. Miller and John Hunter Booth. The film stars George O'Brien, Sue Carol, Walter McGrail, Warren Hymer, Russell Simpson and Roy Stewart. It is based on the 1915 novel The Lone Star Ranger by Zane Grey. The film was released on January 5, 1930, by Fox Film Corporation.

Originally released as an All-Talking picture, the film seems to have survived only in an International Sound Version, which replaced the dialogue portions of the film with music and intertitles. Parts of the film were shot in Monument Valley and Rainbow Bridge in Utah.

== Cast ==
- George O'Brien as Buck Duane
- Sue Carol as Mary Aldridge
- Walter McGrail as Phil Lawson
- Warren Hymer as Bowery Kid
- Russell Simpson as Colonel John Aldridge
- Roy Stewart as Captain McNally
- Lee Shumway as Henchman Red Cane
- Colin Chase as Tom Laramie
- Richard Alexander as Henchman
- Joel Franz as Hank Jones
- Joe Rickson as Henchman
- Oliver Eckhardt as Lem Parker
- Caroline Rankin as Mrs. Parker
- Elizabeth Patterson as Sarah Martin
- Billy Butts as Bill Jones
- Delmar Watson as Baby Jones
- William Steele as First Deputy
- Bob Fleming as Second Deputy

The Lone Star Ranger (1930)

== Other versions ==
This Zane Grey novel was adapted to film four or more times. Silent versions were released in 1919 and 1923.

The version released in 1930 was tagged as "Zane Grey's first all talking picture". The fourth adaptation was released in 1942.
