= Last of the Duanes (novel) =

1996 novel by Zane Grey

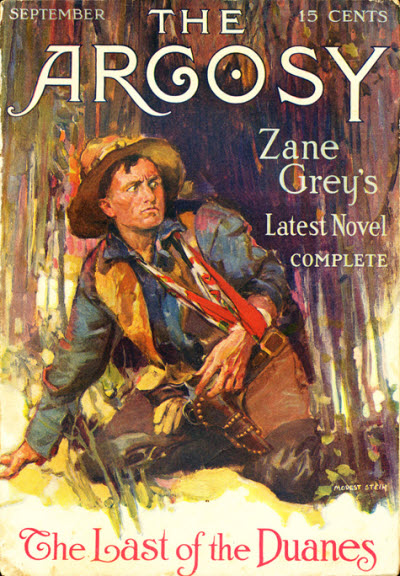
- Author: Zane Grey
- Language: English
- Genre: Western novel
- Publisher: Five Star (US hardback)
- Publication date: 1996
- Publication place: United States
- Media type: Print (Hardback)
- Pages: 313 p (hardback)
- ISBN: 0-7862-0627-6 (hc)
- OCLC: 33817611
- Dewey Decimal: 813/.52 20
- LC Class: PS3513.R6545 L26 1996

Last of the Duanes is a 1914 novel by Zane Grey.

== Origin ==
Last of the Duanes is the original version of The Lone Star Ranger. Originally written in 1913, it was rejected by Munsey's Magazine as too violent. In the meantime, Grey wrote and published another manuscript titled Rangers of the Lone Star early in 1914; later that year, Grey sold the original story to The Argosy. Publishers combined the two serials into The Lone Star Ranger, the first of Grey's works to top a best-seller list.

In 1996, Last of the Duanes was published in its original form.

== Plot summary ==
Buckley "Buck" Duane is the son of a famous Texas gunslinger, a fact that brings him almost nothing but trouble. Duane shoots a man who threatens him and flees his hometown of Wellston to avoid the law. Mixing with outlaws while on the run, he clings desperately to the last of his principles until he rescues a girl named Jennie from the hands of an outlaw king. However, he loses her shortly after the escape and then begins to wander aimlessly, desperation growing as the worth of life slips away.

Three years into his life on the run, he begins to hear of a Texas Ranger captain who seeks to meet him. After running in with vigilante posses of homesteaders and nearly being lynched in a town he'd never been for a murder he didn't commit, he finally seeks out the ranger captain to discover he is wanted to infiltrate and break up an elusive gang of cattle rustlers in exchange for a pardon from the governor.

== Characters ==
- Buckley "Buck" Duane - the son of a famous Texas gunslinger turns who turns outlaw after he is forced to kill a man. He has good heart and never seeks to kill an innocent man, becoming a feared figure among cattle rustling outlaws.
- Luke Stevens - a friendly outlaw who befriends Buck shortly after he is forced to flee his hometown.
- Bland - an outlaw chief and cattle rustler who resides in and controls a lawless community located in a beautiful, hidden valley.
- Kate Bland - the cruel wife of Bland.
- Jennie Lee - a girl being held captive by the Blands.
- Euchre - an aged outlaw who resides in Bland's lawless community. He befriends Duane and helps plot Jennie's escape.
- Chess Alloway - a loyal and gunslinging right-hand man to Bland.
- MacNelly - a Texas Ranger captain who seeks out Buck Duane with an offer of a pardon in exchange for breaking up Cheseldine's gang.
- Jim Fletcher - a gregarious outlaw who resides in an outlaw den at the foot of Mount Ord.
- Cheseldine - an elusive outlaw chief and rival of Bland.
- Phil Knell - a conceited gunman who serves as a lieutenant in Cheseldine's gang.
- Poggin - a gunman with a deadly reputation who serves as a lieutenant in Cheseldine's gang.

== Background ==
The story primarily takes place in the historical region of the Nueces Strip in South Texas, following Buck's fleeing from his hometown.

The later portion of the novel is set around the Big Bend Country geographical region, with the author noting Mount Ord to be home to Cheseldine's outlaw den.

== Themes ==
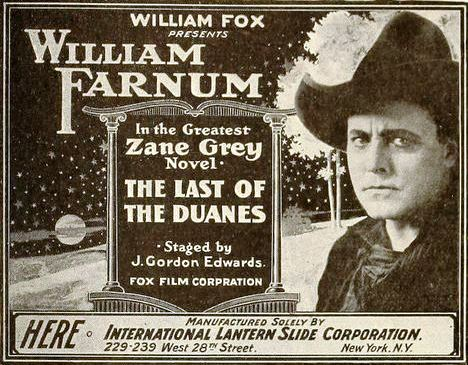
Ad for 1919 film

The coming of law and order on the American frontier leads to a clash of values as the very self-sufficiency of the frontiersmen leads them to break the law. Once broken, the outlaw starts a downward spiral that erodes his humanity as he runs from a harsh justice to an even harsher frontier filled with desperate men. Grey delves into the life of the gunman, examining what makes them dangerous both to themselves and to those around them.

== Film adaptations ==
The Zane Grey novel was adopted into a film four times. The first was a 1919 silent film adaptation starring William Farnum, followed by a 1924 adaptation with Tom Mix, a 1930 adaptation starring George O'Brien, and a 1941 adaptation featuring George Montgomery.

== See also ==
- The Lone Star Ranger
