= Zane Grey =

American novelist (1872–1939)

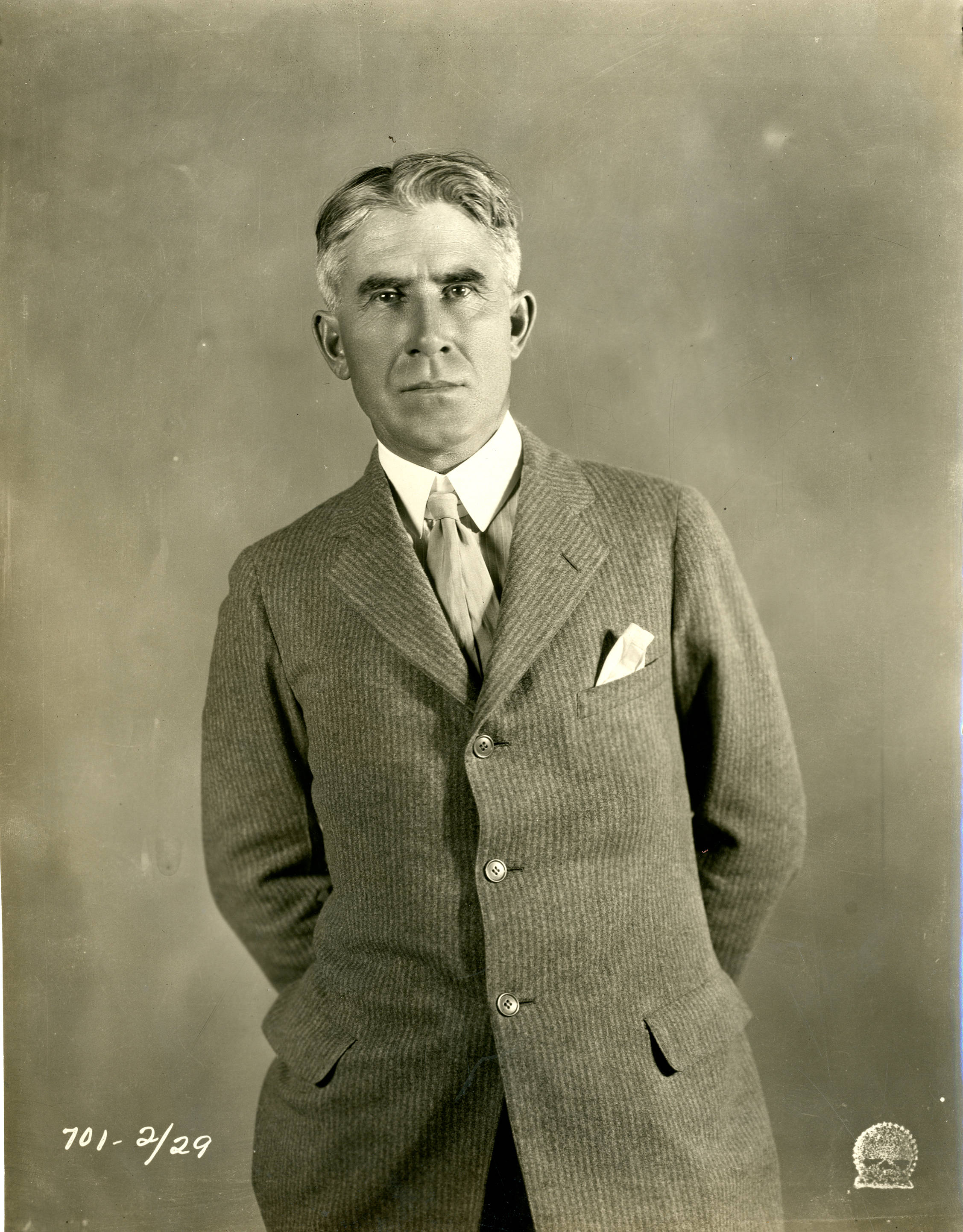
- Grey in 1925
- Born: Pearl Zane Gray (later Grey); January 31, 1872; Zanesville, Ohio, U.S.
- Died: October 23, 1939 (aged 67); Altadena, California, U.S.
- Resting place: Lackawaxen and Union Cemetery, Lackawaxen, Pennsylvania
- Education: University of Pennsylvania
- Occupations: Novelist, dentist
- Spouse: Lina Elise Roth (m. 1905)
- Children: 3, including Romer and Loren
- Writing career
- Genre: Western fiction
- Notable work: Riders of the Purple Sage (1912)

Zane Grey (born Pearl Zane Grey; January 31, 1872 – October 23, 1939) was an American author. He is known for his popular adventure novels and stories associated with the Western genre in literature and the arts; he idealized the American frontier. Riders of the Purple Sage (1912) was his best-selling book.

In addition to the success of his printed works, his books have second lives and continuing influence through adaptations for films and television. His novels and short stories were adapted into 112 films, two television episodes, and a television series, Dick Powell's Zane Grey Theatre.

== Biography ==
=== Early life ===
Pearl Zane Grey was born January 31, 1872, in Zanesville, Ohio. His birth name may have originated from newspaper descriptions of Queen Victoria's mourning clothes as "pearl grey". He was the fourth of five children born to Alice "Allie" Josephine Zane, whose English Quaker immigrant ancestor Robert Zane came to the American colonies in 1673, and her husband, Lewis M. Gray, a dentist. His family changed the spelling of their last name to "Grey" after his birth. Grey later dropped "Pearl" and used "Zane" as his first name.

Grey grew up in Zanesville, a city founded by his maternal grandfather Benjamin Zane's brother-in-law, John McIntire (husband of Sarah Zane), who had been given the land by Grey's maternal great-grandfather, Ebenezer Zane, an American Revolutionary War patriot.

Both Grey and his brother Romer were active and athletic boys who were enthusiastic baseball players and fishermen. From an early age, he was intrigued by history. Soon, he developed an interest in writing. His early interests contributed to his later writing success. For example, his knowledge of history informed his first three novels, which recounted the heroism of ancestors who fought in the American Revolutionary War.

As a child, Grey frequently engaged in violent brawls, probably related to his father's punishing him with severe beatings. Though irascible and asocial like his father, Grey was supported by a loving mother and found a father substitute. Muddy Miser was an old man who approved of Grey's love of fishing and writing, and who talked about the advantages of an unconventional life. Despite warnings by Grey's father to steer clear of Miser, the boy spent much time during five formative years in the company of the old man.

Grey was an avid reader of adventure stories such as Robinson Crusoe and the Leatherstocking Tales, as well as dime novels featuring Buffalo Bill and Deadwood Dick. He was enthralled by and crudely copied the great illustrators Howard Pyle and Frederic Remington. He was particularly impressed with Our Western Border, a history of the Ohio frontier that likely inspired his earliest novels. Grey wrote his first story, Jim of the Cave, when he was fifteen. His father tore it to shreds and beat him.

Because of the shame he felt as the result of a severe financial setback in 1889 due to a poor investment, Lewis Grey moved his family from Zanesville and started again in Columbus, Ohio. While his father struggled to re-establish his dental practice, Grey made rural house calls and performed basic extractions, which his father had taught him. The younger Grey practiced until the state board intervened. His brother Romer earned money by driving a delivery wagon. Grey also worked as a part-time usher in a theater and played summer baseball for the Columbus Capitols, with aspirations of becoming a major leaguer. Eventually, Grey was spotted by a baseball scout and received offers from many colleges. Romer also attracted scouts' attention and went on to have a professional baseball career.

=== University of Pennsylvania and baseball ===
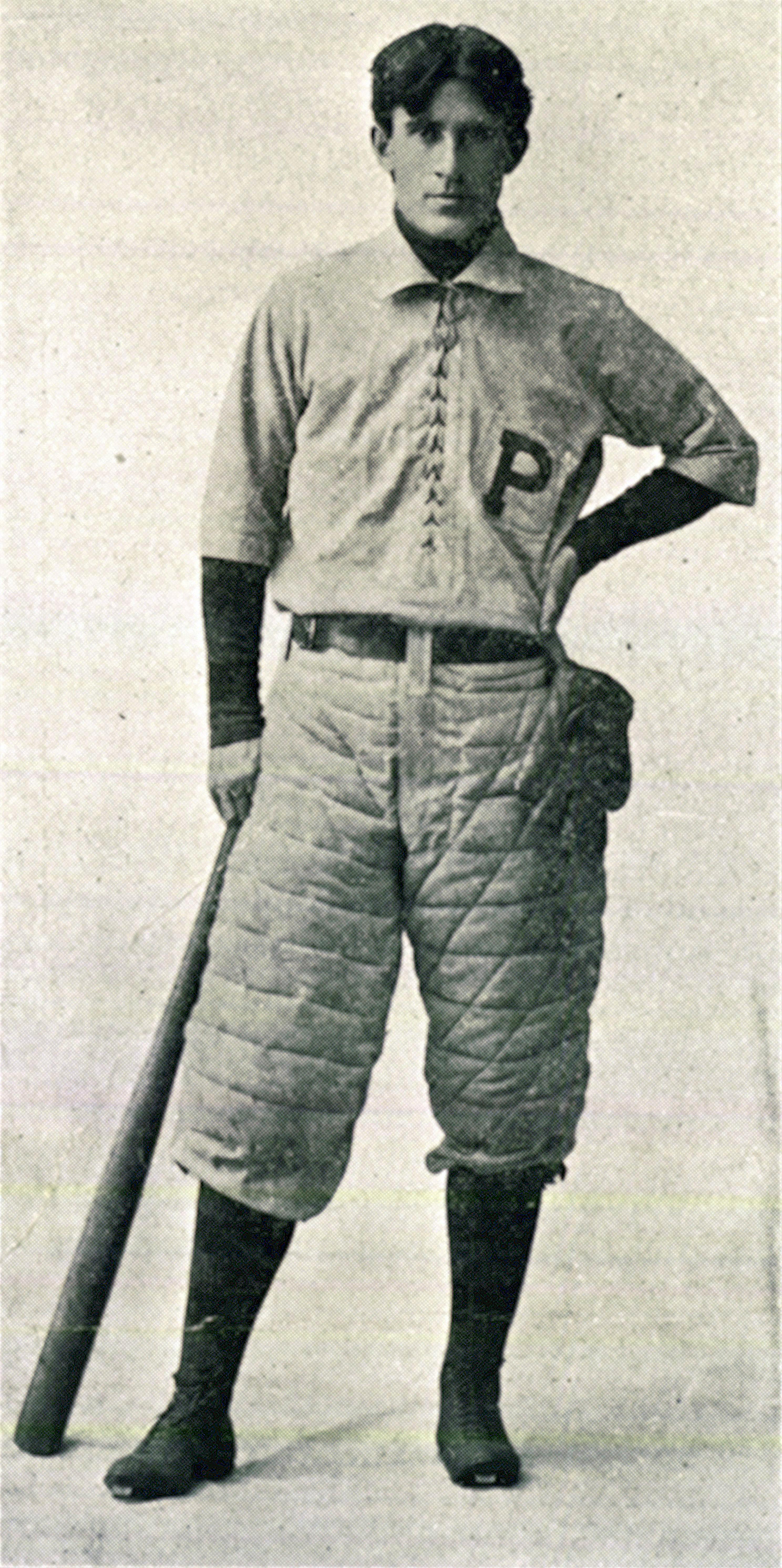
Grey at the University of Pennsylvania, 1895

Grey chose the University of Pennsylvania on a baseball scholarship; he studied dentistry, joined Sigma Nu fraternity, and graduated in 1896. When he arrived at Penn, he had to prove himself worthy of a scholarship before receiving it. He rose to the occasion by coming in to pitch against the Riverton club, pitching five scoreless innings and producing a double in the tenth, which contributed to the win. The Ivy League was highly competitive and an excellent training ground for future pro baseball players. Grey was a solid hitter and an excellent pitcher who relied on a sharply dropping curveball. When the distance from the pitcher's mound to the plate was lengthened by five feet to 60 feet 6 inches, in 1894 (primarily to reduce the dominance of Cy Young's pitching), the effectiveness of Grey's pitching suffered. He was re-positioned to the outfield. The short, wiry baseball player remained a campus hero on the strength of his timely hitting.

He was an indifferent scholar, barely achieving a minimum average. Outside class, he spent his time on baseball, swimming, and creative writing, especially poetry. His shy nature and his teetotaling set him apart from other students, and he socialized little. Grey struggled with the idea of becoming a writer or baseball player for his career, but unhappily concluded that dentistry was the practical choice.

During a summer break, while playing "summer nines" in Delphos, Ohio, Grey was charged with, and quietly settled, a paternity suit. His father paid the $133.40 cost and Grey resumed playing summer baseball. He concealed the episode when he returned to Penn.

Grey went on to play minor league baseball with several teams, including the Newark, New Jersey Colts in 1898 and also with the Orange Athletic Club for several years. His brother Romer Carl "Reddy" Grey (known as "R.C." to his family) did better and played professionally in the minor leagues. Zane Grey and Romer Grey played together as teammates for the 1895 Findlay Sluggers of the Interstate League. Romer played a single major league game in 1903 for the Pittsburgh Pirates.

=== Dentistry ===
After graduating, Grey established his practice in New York City under the name of Dr. Zane Grey in 1896. It was a competitive area but he wanted to be close to publishers. He began to write in the evening to offset the tedium of his dental practice. He struggled financially and emotionally. Grey was a natural writer but his early efforts were stiff and grammatically weak. Whenever possible, he played baseball with the Orange Athletic Club in New Jersey, a team of former collegiate players that was one of the best amateur teams in the country.

Grey often went camping with his brother R.C. in Lackawaxen, Pennsylvania, where they fished in the upper Delaware River. When canoeing in 1900, Grey met seventeen-year-old Lina Roth, better known as "Dolly." Dolly came from a family of physicians and was studying to be a schoolteacher.

=== Marriage and family ===
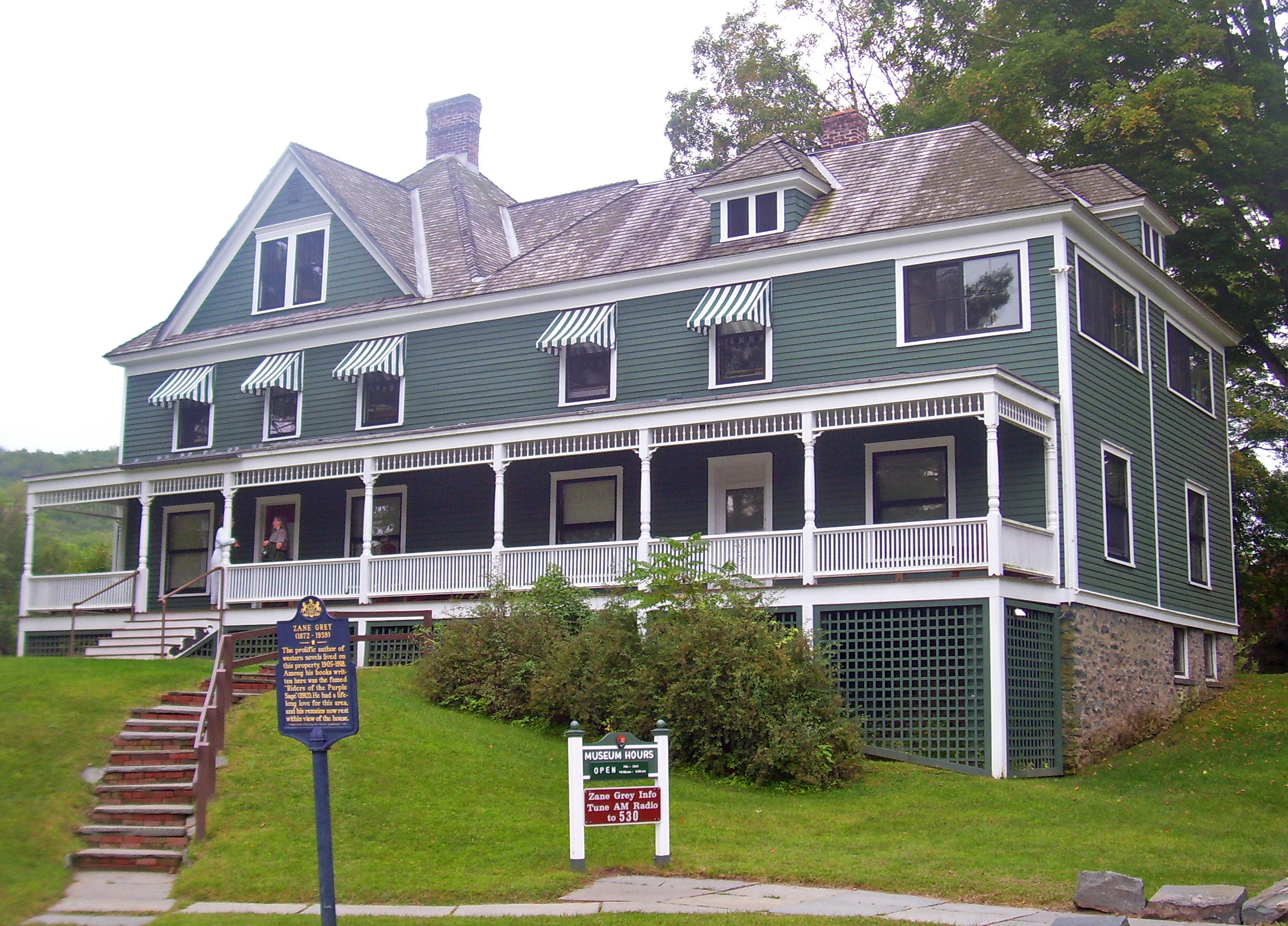
The Zane Grey Museum in Lackawaxen, Pennsylvania

After a passionate and intense courtship marked by frequent quarrels, Grey and Dolly married five years later in 1905. Grey suffered bouts of depression, anger, and mood swings, which affected him most of his life. As he described it, "A hyena lying in ambush—that is my black spell! I conquered one mood only to fall prey to the next ... I wandered about like a lost soul or a man who was conscious of imminent death."

During his courtship of Dolly, Grey still saw previous girlfriends and warned her frankly,

But I love to be free. I cannot change my spots. The ordinary man is satisfied with a moderate income, a home, wife, children, and all that. ... But I am a million miles from being that kind of man and no amount of trying will ever do any good ... I shall never lose the spirit of my interest in women.

After they married in 1905, Dolly gave up her teaching career. They moved to a farmhouse at the confluence of the Lackawaxen and Delaware rivers, in Lackawaxen, Pennsylvania, where Grey's mother and sister joined them. (This house, now preserved and operated as the Zane Grey Museum, is listed on the National Register of Historic Places.) Grey finally ceased his dental practice to work full-time on his nascent literary pursuits. Dolly's inheritance provided an initial financial cushion.

=== Early writing career ===
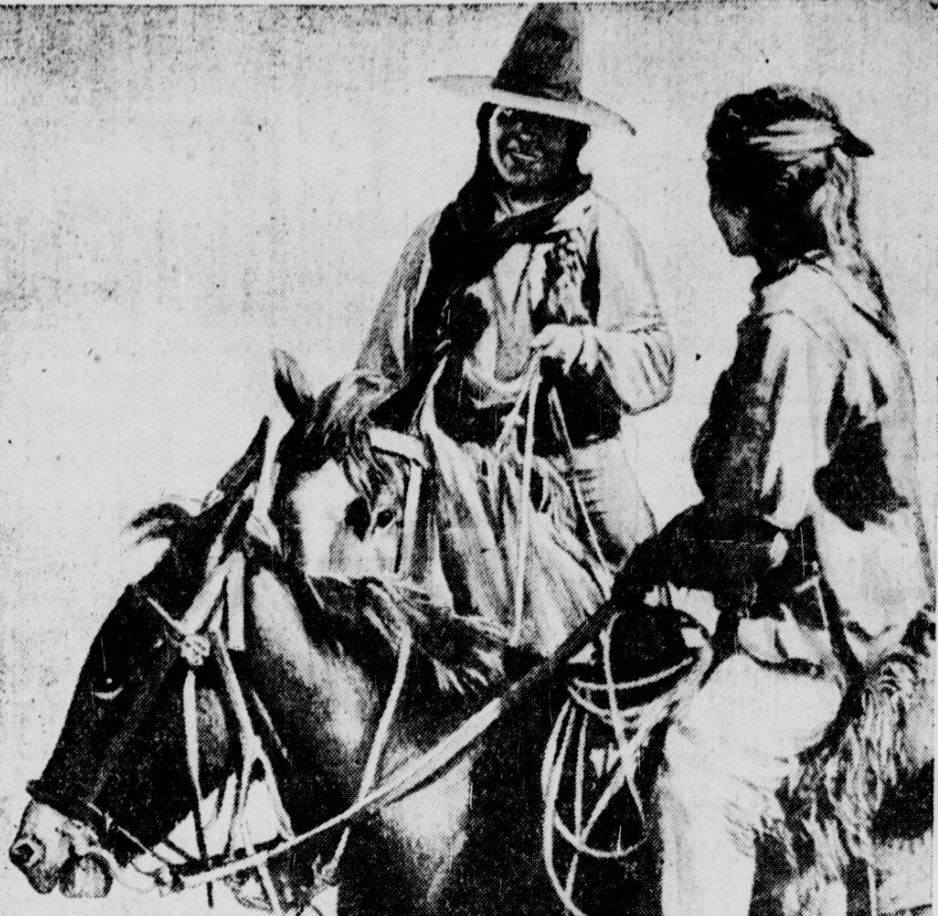
Picture taken by Grey of Tse-ne-gat, one of the fighters during the Bluff War

While Dolly managed Grey's career and raised their three children, including son Romer Zane Grey, over the next two decades Grey often spent months away from the family. He fished, wrote, and spent time with his many mistresses. While Dolly knew of his behavior, she seemed to view it as his handicap rather than a choice. Throughout their life together, he highly valued her management of his career and their family, and her solid emotional support. In addition to her considerable editorial skills, she had good business sense and handled all his contract negotiations with publishers, agents, and movie studios. All of his income was split fifty-fifty with her; from her "share," she covered all family expenses. Their considerable correspondence shows evidence of his lasting love for her despite his infidelities and personal emotional turmoil.

The Greys moved to California in 1918. In 1920 they settled in Altadena, California, at a home later known as the '"Zane Grey Estate"'. The estate was destroyed in the January, 2025 Altadena Fire. In Altadena Grey also spent time with his mistress Brenda Montenegro. The two met while hiking Eaton Canyon. Of her he wrote,

I saw her flowing raven mane against the rocks of the canyon. I have seen the red skin of the Navajo, and the olive of the Spaniards, but her ... her skin looked as if her Creator had in that instant molded her just for me. I thought it was an apparition. She seemed to be the embodiment of the West I portray in my books, open and wild.

Grey summed up his feelings for the city: "In Altadena, I have found those qualities that make life worth living."

With the help of Dolly's proofreading and copy editing, Grey gradually improved his writing. His first magazine article, "A Day on the Delaware," a human-interest story about a Grey brothers' fishing expedition, was published in the May 1902 issue of Recreation magazine. Elated at selling the article, Grey offered reprints to patients in his waiting room. In writing, Grey found temporary escape from the harshness of his life and his demons. "Realism is death to me. I cannot stand life as it is." By this time, he had given up baseball.

Grey read Owen Wister's great Western novel The Virginian. After studying its style and structure in detail, he decided to write a full-length work. Grey had difficulties in writing his first novel, Betty Zane (1903). When it was rejected by Harper & Brothers, he lapsed into despair. The novel dramatized the heroism of an ancestor, Betty Zane who had saved Fort Henry. He self-published it, perhaps with funds provided by his wife Dolly or his brother R. C.'s wealthy girlfriend Reba Smith. From the beginning, vivid description was the strongest aspect of his writing.

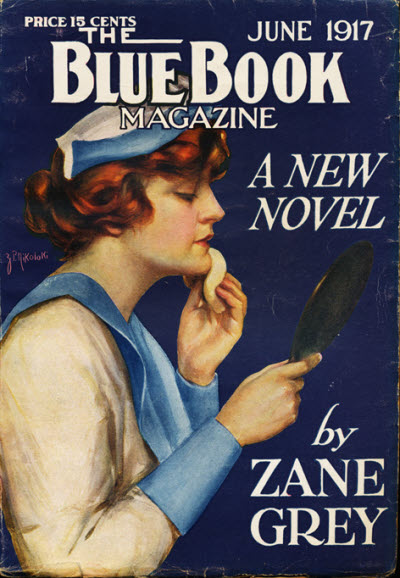
Grey's novel The Roaring U.P. Trail was serialized in Blue Book in 1917.

After attending a lecture in New York in 1907 at the Camp-Fire Club by Charles Jesse "Buffalo" Jones, western hunter and guide who had co-founded Garden City, Kansas, Grey arranged for a mountain lion-hunting trip to the North Rim of the Grand Canyon. He brought along a camera to document his trips and prove his adventures. He also began the habit of taking copious notes, not only of scenery and activities but of dialogue. His first two trips were arduous, but Grey learned much from his companions on these adventures. He gained the confidence to write convincingly about the American West, its characters, and its landscape. Treacherous river crossings, unpredictable beasts, bone-chilling cold, searing heat, parching thirst, bad water, irascible tempers, and heroic cooperation all became real to him. He wrote, "Surely, of all the gifts that have come to me from contact with the West, this one of sheer love of wildness, beauty, color, grandeur, has been the greatest, the most significant for my work."

Upon returning home in 1909, Grey wrote a new novel, The Last of the Plainsmen, describing the adventures of Buffalo Jones. Harper's editor Ripley Hitchcock rejected it, the fourth work in a row. He told Grey, "I do not see anything in this to convince me you can write either narrative or fiction." Grey wrote dejectedly,

I don't know which way to turn. I cannot decide what to write next. That which I desire to write does not seem to be what the editors want ... I am full of stories and zeal and fire ... yet I am inhibited by doubt, by fear that my feeling for life is false.

The book was later published by the American magazine, Outing, which provided Grey some satisfaction. Grey next wrote a series of magazine articles and juvenile novels.

With the birth of his first child pending, Grey felt compelled to complete his next novel, The Heritage of the Desert. He wrote it in four months in 1910. It quickly became a bestseller. Grey took his next work to Hitchcock again; this time Harper published his work, a historical romance in which Mormon characters were of central importance. Grey continued to write popular novels about Manifest Destiny, the conquest of the Old West, and the behavior of men in elemental conditions.

Two years later Grey produced his best-known book, Riders of the Purple Sage (1912), his all-time best-seller, and one of the most successful Western novels in history. Hitchcock rejected it, but Grey took his manuscript directly to the vice president of Harper, who accepted it. The novel had a sequel (The Rainbow Trail, in 1915), and was filmed five times (in 1918, 1925, 1931, 1941, and 1996; but in later film versions the villains are corrupt judges or lawyers, not Mormon polygamists).

=== Later career ===
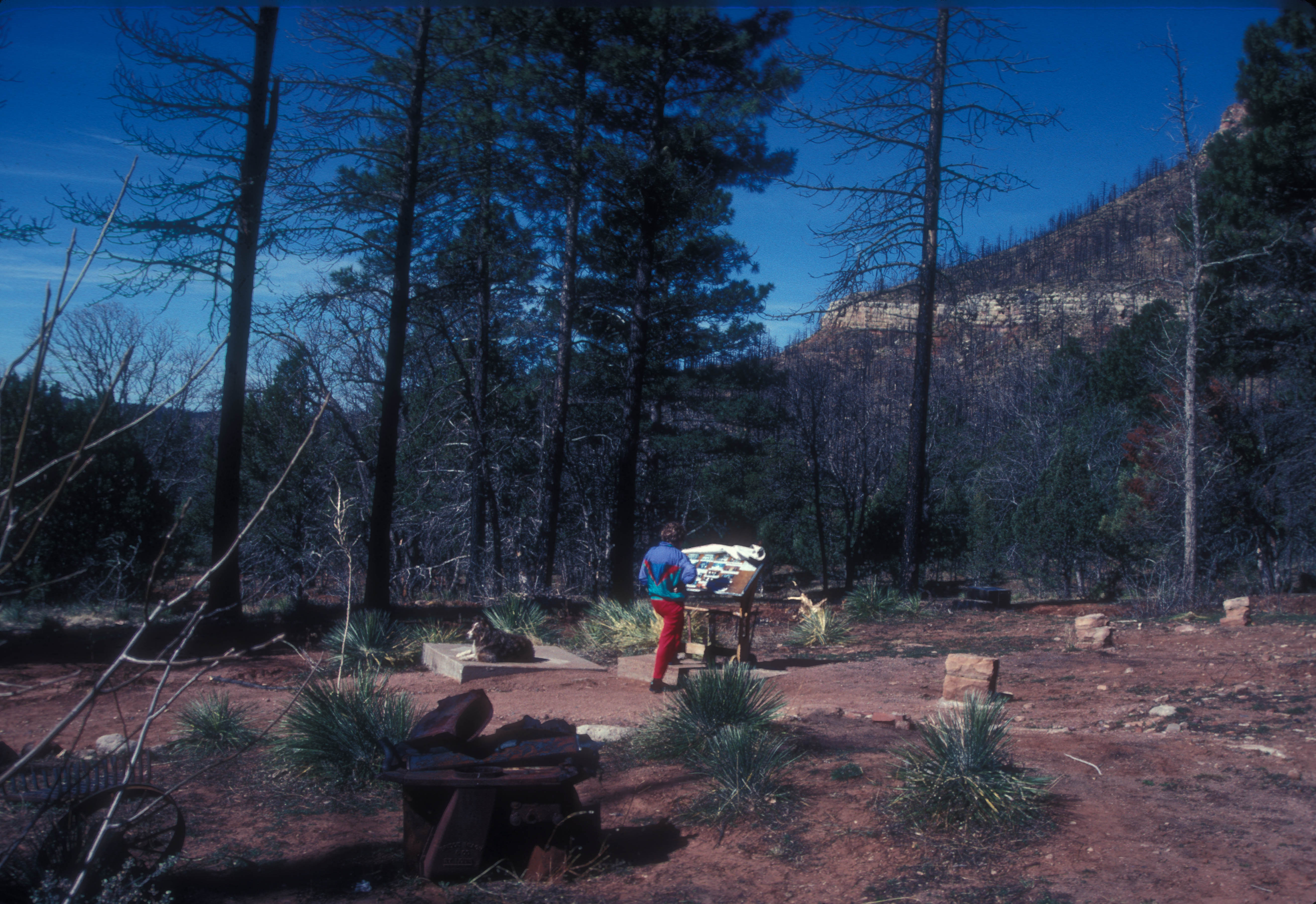
Site of Grey's cabin in Arizona

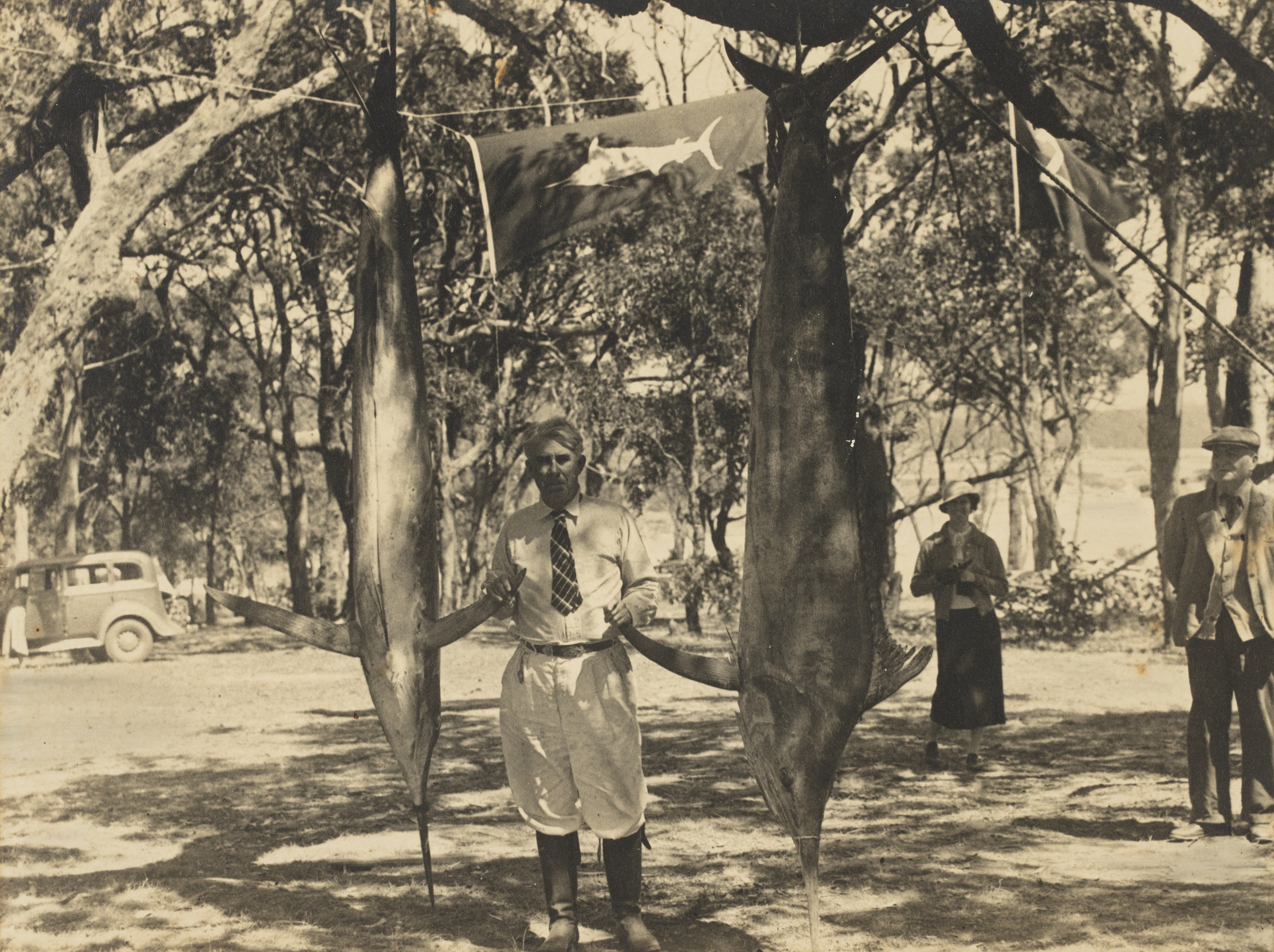
Grey with striped marlin, Bermagui, Australia, 1936 (photographer, T.C. Roughley)

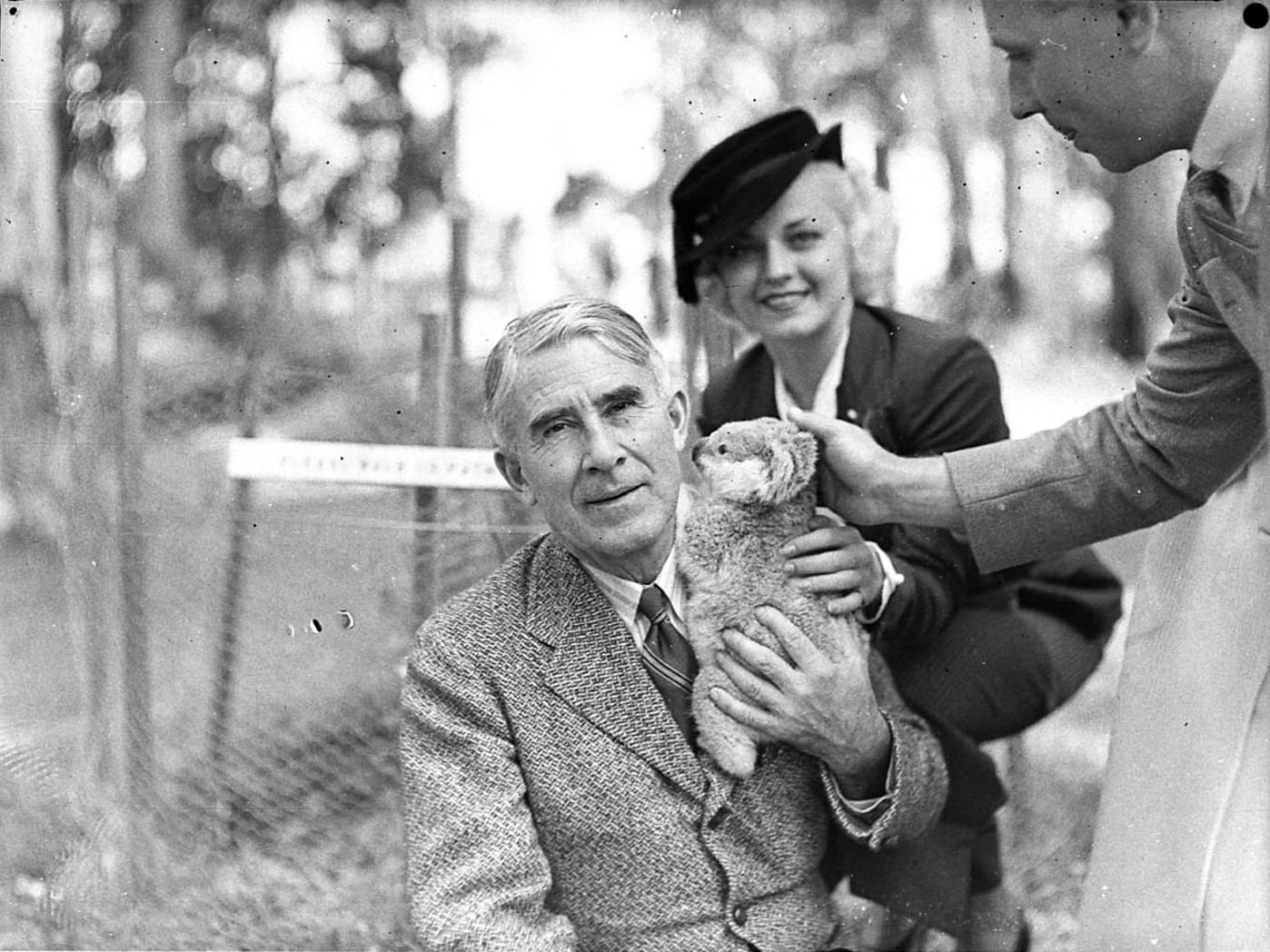
Grey at Koala Park holding a koala during a visit to Australia in December 1935

Zane Grey had become a household name; thereafter, Harper eagerly received all his manuscripts. Other publishers caught on to the commercial potential of the Western novel. Max Brand and Ernest Haycox were among the most notable of other writers of Westerns. Grey's publishers paired his novels with some of the best illustrators of the time, including N. C. Wyeth, Frank Schoonover, Douglas Duer, W. Herbert Dunton, W. H. D. Koerner, and Charles Russell.

Grey had the time and money to engage in his first and greatest passion: fishing. From 1918 until 1932, he was a regular contributor to Outdoor Life magazine. As one of its first celebrity writers, he began to popularize big-game fishing. Several times he went deep-sea fishing in Florida to relax and to write in solitude. Although he commented that "the sea, from which all life springs, has been equally with the desert my teacher and religion", Grey was unable to write a great sea novel. He felt the sea soothed his moods, reduced his depressions, and gained him the opportunity to harvest deeper thoughts:

The lure of the sea is some strange magic that makes men love what they fear. The solitude of the desert is more intimate than that of the sea. Death on the shifting barren sands seems less insupportable to the imagination than death out on the boundless ocean, in the awful, windy emptiness. Man's bones yearn for dust.

Over the years, Grey spent part of his time traveling and the rest of the year writing novels and articles. Unlike writers who could write every day, Grey would have dry spells and then sudden bursts of energy, in which he could write as much as 100,000 words in a month. He wrote longhand in pencil with little punctuation and his first draft was the final one. Punctuation was added later by secretaries when they were preparing the manuscript for publication. He encountered fans in most places. He visited the Rogue River in Oregon in 1919 for a fishing expedition, and fell in love with it. He returned in the 1920s, eventually setting up a cabin on the lower Rogue River. Grey captured the river's essence in two books: Tales of Freshwater Fishing and Rogue River Feud. Other excursions took him to Washington state and Wyoming.

From 1923 to 1930, he spent a few weeks a year at his cabin on the Mogollon Rim, in Central Arizona. After years of abandonment and decay, the cabin was restored in 1966 by Bill Goettl, a Phoenix air conditioning magnate. He opened it to the public as a free-of-charge museum. The Dude Fire destroyed the cabin in 1990. It was later reconstructed 25 miles away in the town of Payson.

During the 1930s, Grey continued to write, but the Great Depression hurt the publishing industry. His sales fell off, and he found it more difficult to sell serializations. He had avoided making investments that would have been affected by the stock market crash of 1929, and continued to earn royalty income, so he did better than many financially. Nearly half of the film adaptations of his novels were made in the 1930s.

From 1925 to his death in 1939, Grey traveled more and further from his family. He became interested in exploring unspoiled lands, particularly the islands of the South Pacific, New Zealand and Australia. He thought Arizona was beginning to be overrun by tourists and speculators. Near the end of his life, Grey looked into the future and wrote:

The so-called civilization of man and his works shall perish from the earth, while the shifting sands, the red looming walls, the purple sage, and the towering monuments, the vast brooding range show no perceptible change.

=== Reception by critics ===
The more books Grey sold, the more the established critics, such as Heywood Broun and Burton Rascoe, attacked him. They claimed his depictions of the West were too fanciful, too violent, and not faithful to the moral realities of the frontier. They thought his characters unrealistic and much larger than life. Broun stated that "the substance of any two Zane Grey books could be written upon the back of a postage stamp."

T. K. Whipple praised a typical Grey novel as a modern version of the ancient Beowulf saga, "a battle of passions with one another and with the will, a struggle of love and hate, or remorse and revenge, of blood, lust, honor, friendship, anger, grief—all of a grand scale and all incalculable and mysterious." However, he also criticized Grey's writing: "His style, for example, has the stiffness which comes from an imperfect mastery of the medium. It lacks fluency and facility."

Grey based his work in his own varied first-hand experience, supported by careful note-taking, and considerable research. Despite his great popular success and fortune, Grey read the reviews and sometimes became paralyzed by negative emotions after critical ones.

In 1923, a reviewer said Grey's "moral ideas ... [were] decidedly askew." Grey reacted with a 20-page treatise, "My Answer to the Critics." He defended his intentions to produce great literature in the setting of the Old West. He suggested that critics should ask his readers what they think of his books, and noted actor and fan John Barrymore as an example. Dolly warned him against publishing the treatise, and he retreated from a public confrontation.

His novel The Vanishing American (1925), first serialized in The Ladies' Home Journal in 1922, prompted a heated debate. People recognized its Navajo hero as patterned after Jim Thorpe, a great Native American athlete. Grey portrayed the struggle of the Navajo to preserve their identity and culture against corrupting influences of the white government and of missionaries. This viewpoint enraged religious groups. Grey contended, "I have studied the Navaho Indians for 12 years. I know their wrongs. The missionaries sent out there are almost everyone mean, vicious, weak, immoral, useless men." To have the book published, Grey agreed to some structural changes. With this book, Grey completed the most productive period of his writing career, having laid out most major themes, character types, and settings.

His Wanderer of the Wasteland is a thinly disguised autobiography. One of his books, "Tales of the Angler's El Dorado, New Zealand," helped establish the Bay of Islands in New Zealand as a premier game fishing area. Several of his later writings (e.g., Rangle River) were based in Australia.

=== Fishing ===
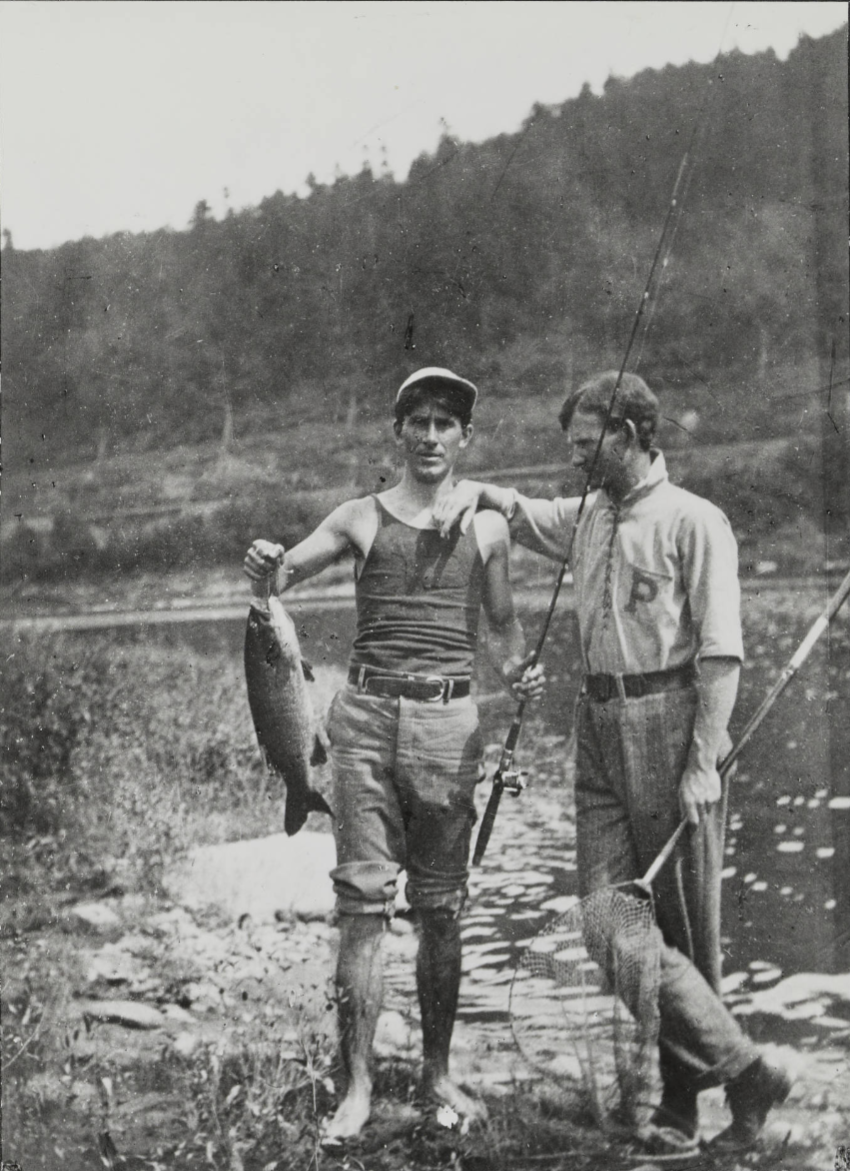
Zane and R.C. Grey showing off a small-mouth bass

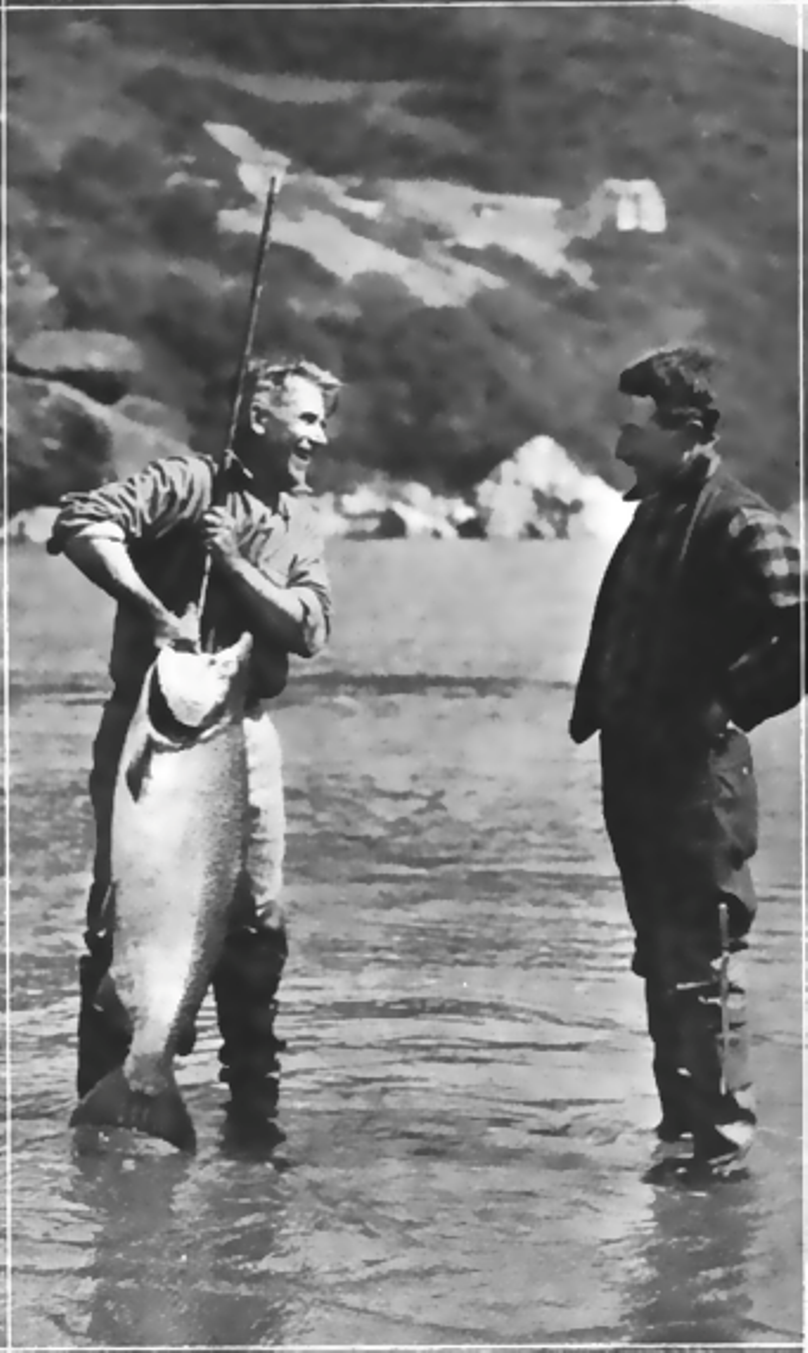
Grey holding a 57 lb. Chinook salmon with brother R.C. looking on

Grey co-founded the "Porpoise Club" with his friend, Robert H. Davis of Munsey's Magazine, to popularize the sport of hunting of dolphins and porpoises. They made their first catch off Seabright, New Jersey, on September 21, 1912, where they harpooned and reeled in a bottlenose dolphin.

Grey's son Loren claims in the introduction to Tales of Tahitian Waters that Zane Grey fished on average 300 days a year through his adult life. Grey and his brother R.C. were frequent visitors to Long Key, Florida, where they helped to establish the Long Key Fishing Club, built by Henry Morrison Flagler. Zane Grey was its president from 1917 to 1920. He pioneered the fishing of Boohoo fish (sailfish). Zane Grey Creek was named for him.

Grey indulged his interest in fishing with visits to Australia and New Zealand. He first visited New Zealand in 1926 and caught several large fish of great variety, including a mako shark, a ferocious fighter that presented a new challenge. Grey established a base at Otehei Bay, Urupukapuka Island in the Bay of Islands, which became a destination for the rich and famous. He wrote many articles in international sporting magazines highlighting the uniqueness of New Zealand fishing, which has produced heavy-tackle world records for the major billfish, striped marlin, black marlin, blue marlin and broadbill. A lodge and camp were established at Otehei Bay in 1927 called the Zane Grey Sporting Club. He held numerous world records during this time and invented the teaser, a hookless bait that is still used today to attract fish. Grey made three additional fishing trips to New Zealand. The second was January to April 1927, the third December 1928 to March 1929, and the last from December 1932 to February 1933.

Grey fished out of Wedgeport, Nova Scotia, for many summers.

Grey also helped establish deep-sea sport fishing in New South Wales, Australia, particularly in Bermagui, which is famous for marlin fishing. Patron of the Bermagui Sport Fishing Association for 1936 and 1937, Grey set a number of world records, and wrote of his experiences in his book An American Angler in Australia.

From 1928 on, Grey was a frequent visitor to Tahiti. He fished the surrounding waters several months at a time and maintained a permanent fishing camp at Vairao. He claimed that these were the most difficult waters he had ever fished, but from these waters he also took some of his most important records, such as the first marlin over 1,000 pounds (450 kg).

Grey had built a getaway home in Santa Catalina Island, California, which still serves as the Zane Grey Pueblo Hotel. He served as president of Catalina's exclusive fishing club, the Tuna Club of Avalon.

=== Death ===
Zane Grey died of heart failure on October 23, 1939, aged 67 at his home in Altadena, California. He was interred at the Lackawaxen and Union Cemetery, Lackawaxen, Pennsylvania.

== Legacy ==
=== Literary works ===
Grey became one of the first millionaire authors.

Zane Grey was a major force in shaping the myths of the Old West; his books and stories were adapted into other media, such as film and TV productions. He was the author of more than 90 books, some published posthumously or based on serials originally published in magazines. His total book sales exceeded 40 million.

Grey wrote not only Westerns, but also two hunting books, six children's books, three baseball books, and eight fishing books. Many of them became bestsellers. It has been estimated he wrote more than nine million words in his career. From 1917 to 1926, Grey was in the top ten best-seller list nine times, which required sales of more than 100,000 copies each time. Even after his death, Harper had a stockpile of his manuscripts and continued to publish a new title yearly until 1963. During the 1940s and afterward, as Grey's books were reprinted as paperbacks, his sales exploded.

Erle Stanley Gardner, prolific author of mystery novels and the Perry Mason series, said of Grey:

[He] had the knack of tying his characters into the land, and the land into the story. There were other Western writers who had fast and furious action, but Zane Grey was the one who could make the action not only convincing but inevitable, and somehow you got the impression that the bigness of the country generated a bigness of character.

Grey was the favorite writer of President Dwight D. Eisenhower.

=== Books published after his death ===
A 1950 newspaper article stated that Romer Zane Grey and his mother had completed work on Cahuenga Pass, one of Zane Grey's unfinished novels, and that a film treatment would be prepared. In 1953 columnist Hedda Hopper reported that a proposed film project, Thirty Thousand on the Hoof, was based on one of the six unfinished Grey novels that had been completed by his wife.

=== Hollywood and other media ===
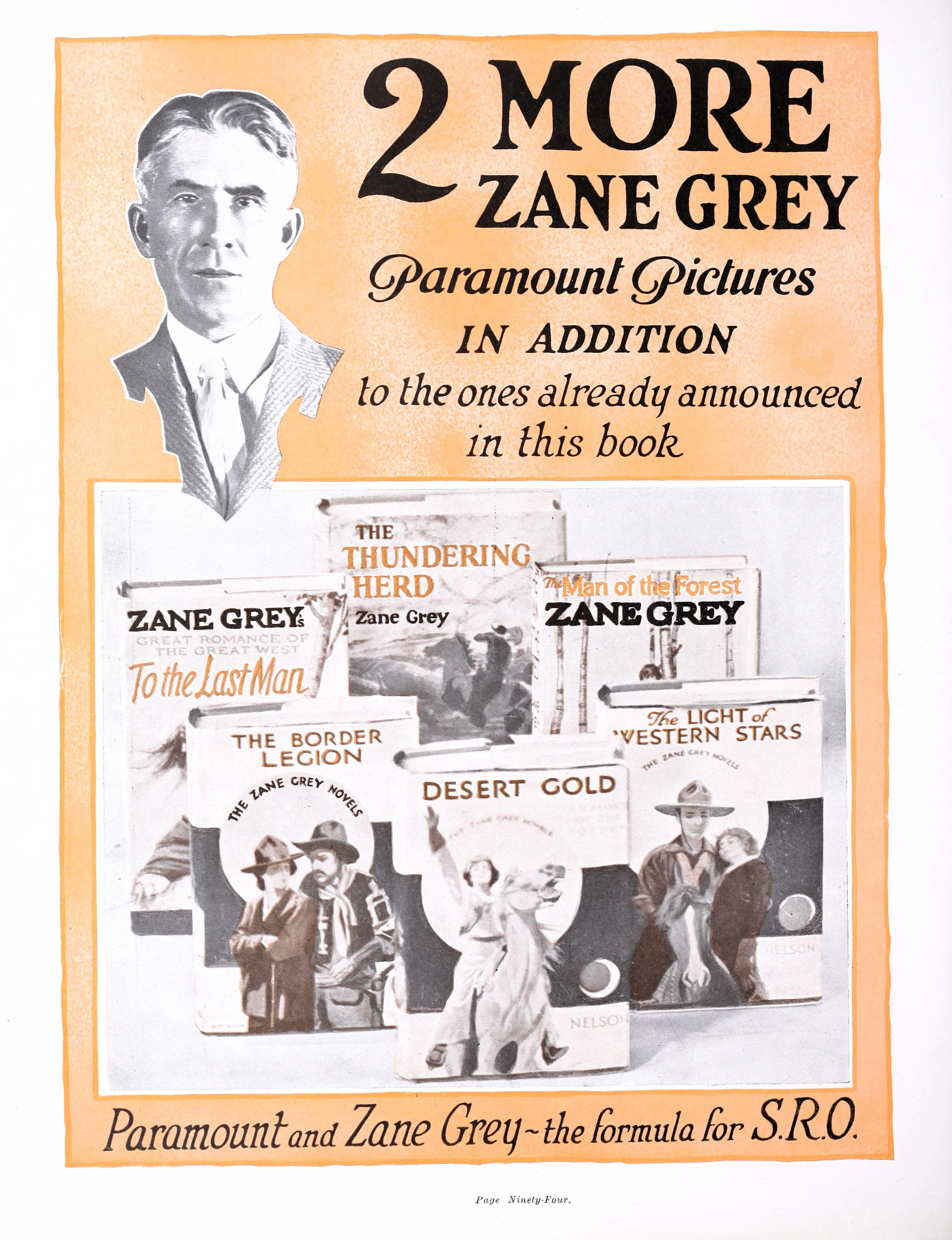
Grey books adapted into movies, circa 1925

Grey started his association with Hollywood when William Fox bought the rights to Riders of the Purple Sage for $2,500 in 1916. The ascending arc of Grey's career matched that of the motion picture industry. It eagerly adapted Western stories to the screen practically from its inception, with Bronco Billy Anderson becoming the first major western star. Legendary director John Ford was then a young stage hand and Tom Mix, who had been a real cowhand, was defining the persona of the film cowboy. The Grey family moved to California to be closer to the film industry and to enable Grey to fish in the Pacific.

After his first two books were adapted to the screen, Grey formed his own motion picture company. This enabled him to control production values and faithfulness to his books. After seven films he sold his company to Jesse Lasky who was a partner of the founder of Paramount Pictures. Paramount made a number of movies based on Grey's writings and hired him as advisor. Many of his films were shot at locations described in his books.

In 1936 Grey appeared as himself in a feature film shot in Australia, White Death (1936). At the same time he provided a story that was filmed as Rangle River (1936).

Grey became disenchanted by the commercial exploitation and copyright infringement of his works. He felt his stories and characters were diluted by being adapted to film. Nearly 50 of his novels were converted into more than 100 Western movies. Shortly after Grey's death, the success of Fritz Lang's Western Union (1941), a film based on one of his books, helped bring about a resurgence in Hollywood westerns. Its costars were Randolph Scott and Robert Young. The period of the 1940s and 1950s included the great works of John Ford, who successfully used the settings of Grey's novels in Arizona and Utah.

The success of Grey's The Lone Star Ranger (the novel was adapted into four movies: 1914, 1919, 1930 and 1942, and a comic book in 1949) and King of the Royal Mounted (popular as a series of Big Little Books and comics, later turned into a 1936 film and three film serials) inspired two radio series by George Trendle (WXYZ, Detroit). Later these were adapted again for television, forming the series The Lone Ranger and Challenge of the Yukon (Sgt. Preston of the Yukon on TV). More of Grey's work was featured in adapted form on The Zane Grey Show, which ran on the Mutual Broadcasting System for five months in the 1940s, and the "Zane Grey Western Theatre," which had a five-year run of 145 episodes.

Many famous actors got their start in films based on Zane Grey books. They included Gary Cooper, Randolph Scott, William Powell, Wallace Beery, Richard Arlen, Buster Crabbe, Shirley Temple, and Fay Wray. Victor Fleming, later director of Gone with the Wind, and Henry Hathaway, who later directed True Grit, both learned their craft on Grey films.

=== Honors and awards ===
- The National Park Service maintains his former home in Lackawaxen, Pennsylvania as the Zane Grey Museum, a part of the Upper Delaware Scenic and Recreational River area.
- Zanesville, Ohio, has a museum named in his honor, the National Road-Zane Grey Museum.
- Zane Grey Terrace, a small residential street in the hillsides of Altadena, is named in his honor.
- The Zane Grey Tourist Park in Bermagui, Australia.
- "Zane Greys'" a headland at the western end of Matapaua Bay, New Zealand.
- The Zane Grey Continuation School is located adjacent to Reseda High School in Reseda, Los Angeles, California.
- Zane Grey room is located at the Sigma Nu – Beta Rho house in honor of where Zane Grey lived for part of his time at the University of Pennsylvania.
- Wilder Ranch State Park near Santa Cruz, California named the Zane Grey Trail after the author. Grey briefly worked as a ranch hand at Wilder Ranch.
- Zane Grey Roadless Area (58,000 acres), along the Rogue River, is managed by the Bureau of Land Management (BLM) in Oregon, USA.
- In 1977, he was inducted into the Hall of Great Westerners of the National Cowboy & Western Heritage Museum.

== Works ==
Works published posthumously after 1939 include original novels, sequels to earlier novels, and compilations and revisions of previously published novels. All western works were translated from English into Spanish by Editorial Juventud in 1959 for the CLASICOS Y MODERNOS collection.

=== Books ===
Year	Title	Genre	Publisher	Links	Notes
1903	Betty Zane	Historical	Charles Francis Press	IA	Republished in 1974 as The Last Ranger
1906	The Spirit of the Border	Historical	A.L. Burt Company		Sequel to Betty Zane
1908	The Last of the Plainsmen	Western	Outing Publishing		Inspired by Charles "Buffalo" Jones
1909	The Last Trail	Historical	A.L. Burt Company		Sequel to The Spirit of the Border
1909	The Short Stop	Baseball	A.C. McClurg		
1910	The Heritage of the Desert	Western	Harper & Brothers		
1910	The Young Forester	Western	Harper & Brothers		
1911	The Young Pitcher	Baseball	Harper & Brothers		
1911	The Young Lion Hunter	Western	Harper & Brothers		
1912	Riders of the Purple Sage	Western	Harper & Brothers	IA PG LibriVox	
1912	Ken Ward in the Jungle	Western	Harper & Brothers		
1913	Desert Gold	Western	Harper & Brothers		
1914	The Light of Western Stars	Western	Harper & Brothers		
1914	The Rangers of the Lone Star	Western	Harper & Brothers		
1915	The Lone Star Ranger	Western	Harper & Brothers		
1915	The Rainbow Trail	Western	Harper & Brothers		Sequel to Riders of the Purple Sage
1916	The Border Legion	Western	Harper & Brothers		
1917	Wildfire	Western	Harper & Brothers		
1918	The Roaring U.P. Trail	Western	Harper & Brothers		
1919	The Desert of Wheat	Western	Harper & Brothers		
1919	Tales of Fishes	Fishing	Harper & Brothers		
1920	The Man of the Forest	Western	Grosset & Dunlap		
1920	The Redheaded Outfield and other Baseball Stories	Baseball	Harper & Brothers		
1921	The Mysterious Rider	Western	Harper & Brothers	IA LibriVox	
1921	To the Last Man	Western	Harper & Brothers		
1922	The Day of the Beast	Fiction	Harper & Brothers		
1922	Tales of Lonely Trails	Adventure	Harper & Brothers		
1923	Wanderer of the Wasteland	Western	Harper & Brothers		
1923	Tappan's Burro	Western	Harper & Brothers		
1924	The Call of the Canyon	Western	Harper & Brothers		
1924	Roping Lions in the Grand Canyon	Adventure	Harper & Brothers		
1924	Tales of Southern Rivers	Fishing	Harper & Brothers		
1925	The Thundering Herd	Western	Harper & Brothers		
1925	The Vanishing American	Western	Harper & Brothers		
1925	Captives of the Desert	Western	Harper & Brothers		
1925	Tales of Fishing Virgin Seas	Fishing	Harper & Brothers		
1926	Under the Tonto Rim	Western	Harper & Brothers		
1926	Tales of the Angler's Eldorado, New Zealand	Fishing	Harper & Brothers		
1927	Forlorn River	Western	Harper & Brothers		
1927	Tales of Swordfish and Tuna	Fishing	Harper & Brothers		
1928	Nevada	Western	Harper & Brothers		Sequel to Forlorn River
1928	Wild Horse Mesa	Western	Harper & Brothers		Originally serialized in The Country Gentleman in 1924
1928	Don, the Story of a Lion Dog	Western	Harper & Brothers		
1928	Avalanche	Western	Harper & Brothers		
1928	Tales of Fresh Water Fishing	Fishing	Harper & Brothers		
1929	Fighting Caravans	Western	Harper & Brothers		
1929	Stairs of Sand	Western	Harper & Brothers		Sequel to Wanderer of the Wasteland
1930	The Wolf Tracker	Western	Harper & Brothers		
1930	The Shepherd of Guadaloupe	Western	Harper & Brothers		
1931	Sunset Pass	Western	Harper & Brothers		
1931	Tales of Tahitian Waters	Fishing	Harper & Brothers		
1931	Book of Camps and Trails	Adventure	Harper & Brothers		Partial re-print of Tales of Lonely Trails
1932	Arizona Ames	Western	Harper & Brothers		
1932	Robbers' Roost	Western	Harper & Brothers		
1933	The Drift Fence	Western	Harper & Brothers		
1933	The Hash Knife Outfit	Western	Harper & Brothers		Sequel to The Drift Fence
1934	Code of the West	Western	Harper & Brothers		
1935	Thunder Mountain	Western	Harper & Brothers		
1935	The Trail Driver	Western	Whitman Publishing		
1936	The Lost Wagon Train	Western	Harper & Brothers		
1937	West of the Pecos	Western	Whitman Publishing		
1937	An American Angler in Australia	Fishing	Whitman Publishing		
1938	Raiders of Spanish Peaks	Western	Whitman Publishing		
1939	Western Union	Western	Harper & Brothers		
1939	Knights of the Range	Western	Harper & Brothers		
1940	Thirty Thousand on the Hoof	Western	Harper & Brothers		Republished as Woman of the Frontier
1940	Twin Sombreros	Western	Harper & Brothers		Sequel to Knights of the Range
1942	Majesty's Rancho	Western	Harper & Brothers		Sequel to Light of Western Stars
1943	Omnibus	Western	Harper & Brothers		
1944	Wilderness Trek	Western	Harper & Brothers		
1946	Shadow on the Trail	Western	Harper & Brothers		
1947	Valley of Wild Horses	Western	Harper & Brothers		
1948	Rogue River Feud	Fishing / Western	Harper & Brothers		
1949	The Deer Stalker	Western	Harper & Brothers		
1950	The Maverick Queen	Western	Harper & Brothers		
1951	The Dude Ranger	Western	Harper & Brothers		
1952	Captives of the Desert	Western	Harper & Brothers		
1952	Adventures in Fishing	Fishing	Harper & Brothers		Compilation of 1919-37 Fishing stories.
1953	Wyoming	Western	Harper & Brothers		
1954	Lost Pueblo	Western	Harper & Brothers		
1955	Black Mesa	Western	Harper & Brothers		
1956	Stranger from the Tonto	Western	Harper & Brothers		
1957	The Fugitive Trail	Western	Harper & Brothers		
1958	Arizona Clan	Western	Harper & Brothers		
1959	Horse Heaven Hill	Western	Harper & Brothers		
1960	The Ranger and Other Stories	Western	Harper & Row		
1961	Blue Feather and Other Stories	Western	Harper & Row		
1963	Boulder Dam	Historical	HarperCollins		
1974	The Adventures of Finspot	Fishing	D-J Books		
1975	Zane Grey's Greatest Indian Stories	Western	Dorchester Publishing		Includes original ending to The Vanishing American (1925)
1975	The Buffalo Hunter	Western	Gunsmoke	IA	Compilation of Grey stories
1977	The Reef Girl	Fishing	Harper & Row		
1978	Tales from a Fisherman's Log	Fishing	Hodder & Stoughton		ZG in 2nd visit New Zealand - 1927.
1979	The Camp Robber and Other Stories	Western	Walter J. Black		
1981	The Lord of Lackawaxen Creek	Adventure	Lime Rock Press		
1982	Angler's Eldorado: Zane Grey in New Zealand	Fishing	Walter J. Black, Reed NZ		Partial reprint of 1926 edition (first 10 chapters,) plus additional content. Australian edition has similar title but "South Pacific" replaces "New Zealand."
1982	Lost in the Never Never	Australian Novella	Ian Henry Publishers		And Silvermane in same volume
1994	George Washington, Frontiersman	Historical	University of Pennsylvania Press and Forge Books		
1996	Last of the Duanes	Western	Gunsmoke Westerns		Unabridged version of The Lone Star Ranger (1915)
2003	The Desert Crucible	Western	Leisure Books		Unabridged version of The Rainbow Trail (1915)
2004	Tonto Basin	Western	Leisure Books		Unabridged version of To the Last Man (1921)
2007	Shower of Gold	Western	Leisure Books		Unabridged version of Desert Gold (1915)
2008	The Great Trek	"Western" set in Australia	Five Star		Unabridged version of The Wilderness Trek (1944)
2009	Tales of the Gladiator	Fishing	ZG Collections		Diary entries from Grey on Gladiator; 1920s, California fishing
2016	Tales of Florida Fishes	Fishing	Zane Grey's West Society		Compilation of Grey stories

=== Films ===
Between 1911 and 1996, 112 films were adapted from Grey's novels and stories. In addition, three television series included episodes adapted from his work, including Dick Powell's Zane Grey Theatre (1956–58).

- Fighting Blood (1911 short) (Watch) novel
- Graft (1915) story
- The Border Legion (1918) novel
- Riders of the Purple Sage (1918) novel
- The Rainbow Trail (1918) story
- The Light of the Western Stars (1918) novel
- The Lone Star Ranger (1919) novel
- The Last of the Duanes (1919) story
- Desert Gold (1919)
- Riders of the Dawn (1920) novel The Desert of Wheat
- Days of Daring (1920 short) novel In the Days of Thundering Herd
- The U.P. Trail (1920) novel
- Man of the Forest (1921) novel
- The Mysterious Rider (1921) novel
- The Last Trail (1921) novel
- When Romance Rides (1922) novel Wildfire
- Golden Dreams (1922) story
- To the Last Man (1923) novel
- The Lone Star Ranger (1923) novel
- The Call of the Canyon (1923) story
- Heritage of the Desert (1924) novel
- Wanderer of the Wasteland (1924) novel
- The Border Legion (1924) novel
- The Last of the Duanes (1924) story
- The Thundering Herd (1925) novel
- Riders of the Purple Sage (1925) (Watch) novel
- Code of the West (1925) novel
- The Rainbow Trail (1925) story
- The Light of Western Stars (1925) novel
- Wild Horse Mesa (1925) novel
- The Vanishing American (1925) novel
- Desert Gold (1926) novel
- Born to the West (1926) story
- Forlorn River (1926) novel
- Man of the Forest (1926) novel
- The Last Trail (1927) novel
- The Mysterious Rider (1927) novel
- Drums of the Desert (1927) novel Captives of the Desert
- Lightning (1927) story
- Nevada (1927) novel
- Open Range (1927) novel Valley of Wild Horses
- Under the Tonto Rim (1928) novel
- The Vanishing Pioneer (1928) novel Golden Dreams
- The Water Hole (1928) story
- Avalanche (1928) novel
- Sunset Pass (1929) novel
- Stairs of Sand (1929) novel
- The Lone Star Ranger (1930) novel
- The Light of Western Stars (1930) novel
- The Border Legion (1930) novel
- The Last of the Duanes (1930) novel
- El último de los Vargas (1930) novel
- Fighting Caravans (1931) novel Wagon Wheels
- Riders of the Purple Sage (1931) novel
- The Rainbow Trail (1932) story
- Heritage of the Desert (1932) story
- The Golden West (1932) story
- Wild Horse Mesa
- End of the Trail (1932) story
- Robbers' Roost (1932) novel
- The Woman Accused (1933) story Liberty Magazine along with 7 other authors
- Smoke Lightning (1933) novel Canyon Walls
- The Thundering Herd (1933) story
- Under the Tonto Rim (1933) novel The Bee Hunter
- Sunset Pass (1933) novel
- Life in the Raw (1933) novel
- The Last Trail (1933) novel
- Man of the Forest (1933) novel
- To the Last Man (1933) story
- The Last Round-Up (1934) novel The Border Legion
- Wagon Wheels (1934) novel Fighting Caravans
- The Dude Ranger (1934) story
- West of the Pecos (1934) novel
- Home on the Range (1935) novel Code of the West
- Rocky Mountain Mystery (1935) novel Golden Dreams
- Wanderer of the Wasteland (1935) novel
- Thunder Mountain (1935) novel
- Nevada (1935) novel
- Drift Fence (1936) novel
- Desert Gold (1936) novel
- The Arizona Raiders (1936) novel Raiders of Spanish Peaks
- King of the Royal Mounted (1936) story
- End of the Trail (1936) novel Outlaws of Palouse
- Arizona Mahoney (1936) novel Stairs of Sand
- Rangle River (1936) novel
- Forlorn River (1937) novel
- Roll Along, Cowboy (1937) novel The Dude Ranger
- Thunder Trail (1937) story "Arizona Ames"
- Born to the West (1937) novel
- The Mysterious Rider (1938) characters
- Heritage of the Desert (1939) novel
- The Light of Western Stars (1940) novel
- Knights of the Range (1940) story
- The Border Legion (1940) novel
- Western Union (1941) novel
- Last of the Duanes (1941) story
- Riders of the Purple Sage (1941) novel
- Lone Star Ranger (1942) novel
- Nevada (1944) novel
- Wanderer of the Wasteland (1945) novel
- West of the Pecos (1945) novel
- Sunset Pass (1946) novel
- Code of the West (1947) novel
- Thunder Mountain (1947) novel
- Gunfighters (1947) novel Twin Sombreros
- Under the Tonto Rim (1947) novel
- Wild Horse Mesa
- Red Canyon (1949) novel Wildfire
- Robbers' Roost (1955) story
- The Vanishing American (1955) novel
- Chevron Hall of Stars (1956, TV) story "The Lone Hand"
- Schlitz Playhouse of Stars (1956 TV) story "A Tale of Wells Fargo"
- The Maverick Queen (1956) novel
- Dick Powell's Zane Grey Theatre (1956–58 TV) stories for 6 episodes
- Riders of the Purple Sage (1996, TV film) novel

== See also ==
- Bret Harte
- Rex Beach
- James Oliver Curwood
- Jack London
