= Tales of Tahitian Waters =

1931 book by Zane Grey

First edition

Tales of Tahitian Waters is a 1931 book by Zane Grey. The book collects several fishing stories and was first published by Harper Brothers and was later republished in 1990 by Derrydale Press. In the book Grey describes catching a marlin weighing 1,040 pounds and the catch was credited as being the first 1,000 pound fish ever caught.

Keith Elliott of The Independent called Tales of Tahitian Waters along with Tales of Swordfish and Tuna, and Tales of Fishing Virgin Seas "even today, among the finest works on big-game fishing".

== Synopsis ==
Tales of Tahitian Waters describes Grey's fishing expeditions to the Tahitian Islands in 1928, 1929, and 1930. In the book, Grey claims to be the first big game fisherman to fish these waters and there is little cause to doubt his claim. He had passed through Tahiti en route to other fishing expeditions in Australia and New Zealand, and had heard of 30-foot-long (9.1 m) marlin and 50-foot-long (15 m) sharks. Grey held many fishing records for these species and was determined to pursue these fish. In Tales of Tahitian Waters, he claims a special affection for these waters, and he visited them several times afterward, although those visits were not the subject of this book.

Grey believed that these were the most difficult waters he had fished. Amongst other trials, Tales of Tahitian Waters records an 83-day span during which Grey did not catch a single billfish. It is believed that this provided inspiration for Hemingway's The Old Man and the Sea. Carlton Jackson wrote in his 1989 book Zane Grey:

On the eighty-fourth day, he caught, with rod and reel, a giant Tahitian marlin that weighed 1,040 founds. Although Grey tried desperately to get the creature ashore, the fish was ravaged by a shark. Some Grey fans today credit Grey's experience with inspiring Hemingway's The Old Man and the Sea. See Zane Grey, Tales of Tahitian Waters (1931), and The Zane Grey Collector, 3:1:12–13.

Grey's Tahiti expeditions were months at a time, and he built a permanent camp at Vairao, a beach he describes in superlatives.

Tales of Tahitian Waters also includes descriptions of a number of previously uncatalogued species, some of which Grey caught and recorded, some of which were hooked but were too big to bring to the boat, and some of which were merely seen in the water. The book includes many photographs taken by Grey and his crew, as well as a few watercolors painted by artists who stayed at Grey's fishing camp.
