= Russell Simpson (actor) =

American actor (1880–1959)

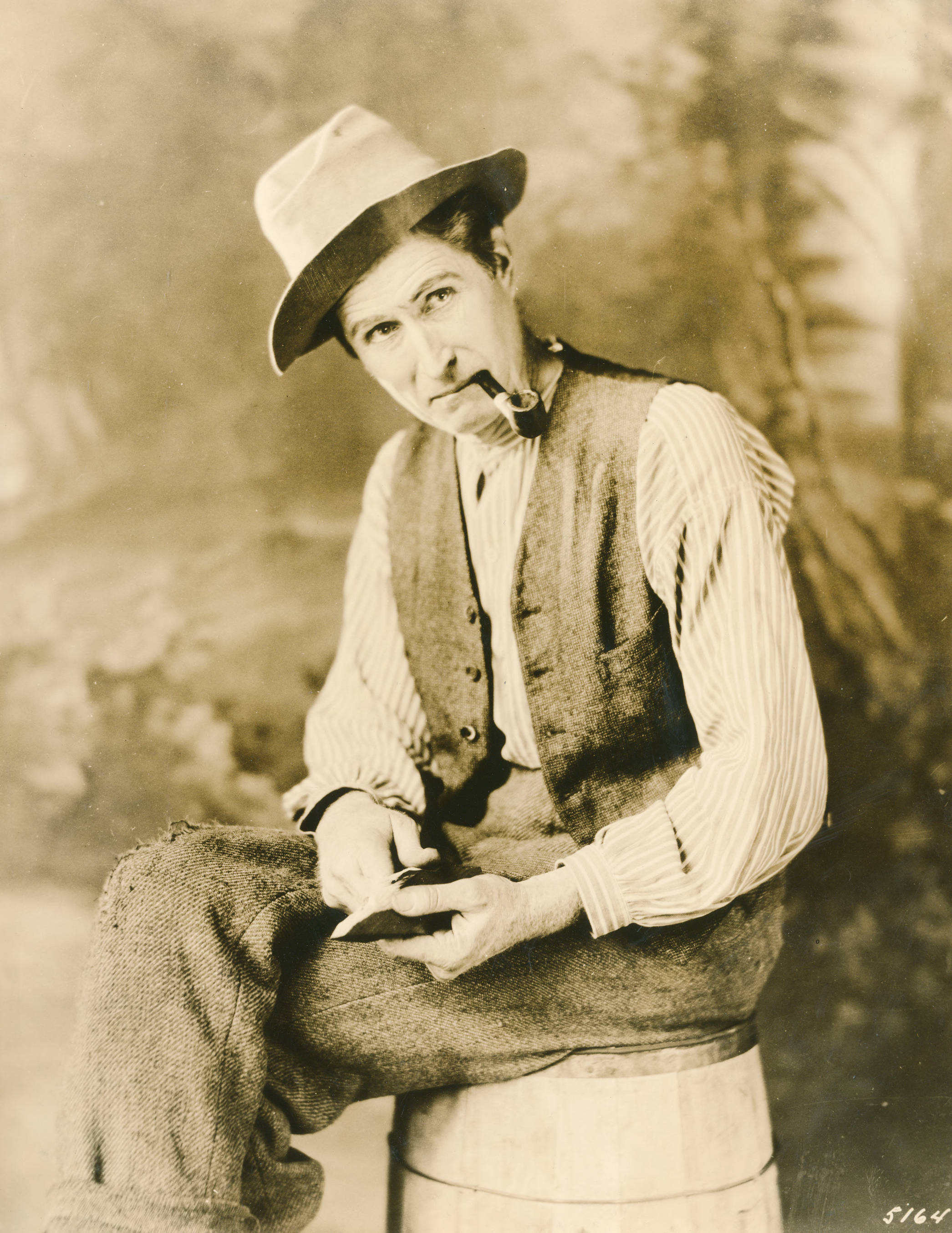
- Simpson in 1923
- Born: Russell McCaskill Simpson; June 17, 1880; Danville, California, U.S.
- Died: December 12, 1959 (aged 79); Woodland Hills, California, U.S.
- Years active: 1914–1959
- Spouse: Gertrude Aller (m. 1910)
- Children: 1

Russell McCaskill Simpson (June 17, 1880 – December 12, 1959) was an American character actor.

== Early life ==
Russell Simpson was born on June 17, 1880 (other sources indicate 1877) in Danville, California. He attended grammar school in the Danville District in Contra Costa County, California; he graduated on July 2, 1892. At age 18, Simpson prospected for gold in Alaska. He began taking acting classes in Seattle, Washington. He was married to Gertrude Aller from New York City on January 19, 1910.

== Career ==
By 1909, he had gone into the theatre. He appeared in at least two plays on Broadway between 1909 and 1912, and made his motion picture debut in Cecil B. DeMille's 1914 original film version of The Virginian in a bit part. By 1923, when the film was remade, Simpson had progressed to playing the lead villain.

Throughout his career, Simpson worked for 12 years in road shows, stock companies, and on Broadway. Simpson didn't usually perform lead roles, but he did star in many movies throughout the silent movie era. He did perform a lead role as the grandfather in Out of the Dust (1920) and the father in The First Auto (1927).

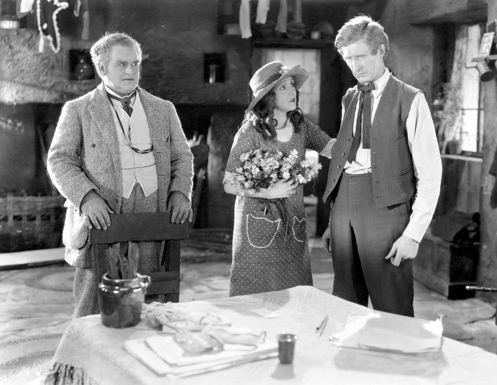
Russell (right) with Lionel Belmore and Laurette Taylor in Peg o' My Heart, 1922

Simpson is best known for his work in the films of John Ford and, in particular, for his portrayal of Pa Joad in The Grapes of Wrath in 1940. He was known for his "grizzled old man" appearances. Gaunt, lanky, and rustic-sounding, Simpson was a familiar character actor for almost forty-five years, particularly as a member of the John Ford Stock Company. He worked up to 1959, the year of his death. His final film was The Horse Soldiers, his tenth film for Ford. Simpson was the president of the Overseas Phonograph Accessories Corporation. He died on December 12, 1959, in Woodland Hills, California. Simpson had appeared in over 500 movies throughout his life.

== Selected filmography ==
- The Old Homestead (1915) as Sheriff
- Lovely Mary (1916) as Peter Nelson
- The Feud Girl (1916) as Zeb Bassett
- The Barrier (1917) as John Gaylord / John Tale
- The Food Gamblers (1917) as Samuel Sloane
- Blue Jeans (1917) as Jacob Tutwiler
- A Weaver of Dreams (1918) as Martin Chandler
- Breakers Ahead (1918) as Captain Scudder
- Riders of the Night (1918) as Sally's Grandfather
- The Uphill Path (1918) as James Lawton
- The Border Legion (1918) as Overland Bradley
- Oh, Johnny! (1918) as Adele's father
- The Challenge Accepted (1918) as Uncle Zeke Sawyer
- Fighting Cressy (1919) as Hiram McKinstry
- Desert Gold (1919) as Ladd
- The Deadlier Sex (1920) as Jim Willis
- Lahoma (1920) as Brick Willock
- The Branding Iron (1920) as John Carver
- Godless Men (1920) as 'Black' Pawl
- Bunty Pulls the Strings (1921) as Tammas Biggar
- Under the Lash (1921) as Simeon Krillet
- Shadows of Conscience (1921) as Jim Logan
- Across the Dead-Line (1922) as Enoch Kidder
- Fools of Fortune (1922) as Magpie Simpkins
- Human Hearts (1922) as Paul Logan
- Rags to Riches (1922) as The Sheriff
- Peg o' My Heart (1922) as Jim O'Connell
- The Kingdom Within (1922) as Caleb Deming
- Hearts Aflame (1923) as Black Joe
- The Girl of the Golden West (1923) as Jack Rance
- Circus Days (1923) as Eben Holt
- The Huntress (1923) as Big Jack Skinner
- Defying Destiny (1923) as Mr. Wilkens
- The Virginian (1923) as Trampas
- Desire (1923)
- Painted People (1924) as Fred Lane
- The Narrow Street (1925) as Gaarvey
- Beauty and the Bad Man (1925) as Chuckwalla Bill
- Old Shoes (1925)
- Paint and Powder (1925) as Riley
- Thunder Mountain (1925) as Si Pace
- The Splendid Road (1925) as Capt. Lightfoot
- The Ship of Souls (1925) as Angus Garth
- The Earth Woman (1926) as Ezra Tilden
- Rustling for Cupid (1926) as Hank Blatchford
- The Social Highwayman (1926) as The Mayor's Partner
- Lovey Mary (1926) as Stubbins
- God's Great Wilderness (1927) as Richard Stoner
- Annie Laurie (1927) as Sandy
- The Heart of the Yukon (1927) as 'Cash' Cynon
- The Frontiersman (1927) as Andrew Jackson
- The First Auto (1927) as Hank Armstrong
- Now We're in the Air (1927) as Lord Abercrombie McTavish
- Wild Geese (1927) as Caleb Gare
- The Trail of '98 (1928) as Old Swede (scenes deleted)
- Life's Mockery (1928) as Wolf Miller
- The Bushranger (1928) as Sir Eric
- Tropical Nights (1928) as Singapore Joe
- Noisy Neighbors (1929) as Ebenezer
- All Faces West (1929) as Gunner Bill
- Innocents of Paris (1929) as Emile Leval
- After the Fog (1929) as Joshua Barker
- The Lone Star Ranger (1930) as Colonel John Aldridge
- Abraham Lincoln (1930) as Lincoln's Employer
- Billy the Kid (1930) as Angus McSween
- Man to Man (1930) as Uncle Cal
- The Great Meadow (1931) as Thomas Hall
- Susan Lenox (Her Fall and Rise) (1931) as Doctor
- Ridin' for Justice (1932) as Marshal Joseph Slyde
- Law and Order (1932) as Judge R.W. Williams
- Lena Rivers (1932) as Grandfather Nichols
- The Riding Tornado (1932) as Sheriff
- The Famous Ferguson Case (1932) as Banker Craig
- The Honor of the Press (1932) as City Editor Dan Perkins
- Hello Trouble (1932) as Jonathan Kenyon
- Cabin in the Cotton (1932) as Uncle Joe
- Call Her Savage (1932) as Old Man in Wagon Train
- Silver Dollar (1932) as Hamlin
- Face in the Sky (1933) as Pa Nathan Brown
- Sixteen Fathoms Deep (1934) as A.B. Crockett
- Frontier Marshal (1934) as Editor Pickett
- Carolina (1934) as Richards
- Three on a Honeymoon (1934) as Ezra MacDuff
- Ever Since Eve (1934) as Jim Wood
- The World Moves On (1934) as Notary (1825)
- West of the Pecos (1934) as Roy Neal
- The County Chairman (1935) as Vance Jimmison
- The Hoosier Schoolmaster (1935) as Doc Small
- Motive for Revenge (1935) as McAllister
- Way Down East (1935) as Squire Amasa Bartlett
- Paddy O'Day (1936) as Benton
- Man Hunt (1936) as Jeff Parkington
- The Harvester (1936) as Abner Prewett
- Girl of the Ozarks (1936) as Bascomb Rogers
- San Francisco (1936) as Red Kelly
- The Crime of Dr. Forbes (1936) as Sheriff Neil
- Back to Nature (1936) as Sheriff (uncredited)
- Ramona (1936) as Scroggs
- Wild Brian Kent (1936) as Race Judge (uncredited)
- Green Light (1937) as Sheep Man
- Maid of Salem (1937) as Village Marshal (uncredited)
- Mountain Justice (1937) as Mr. Matthew Turnbull
- That I May Live (1937) as Bish Plivens
- Parnell (1937) as Dead Child's Father (uncredited)
- Yodelin' Kid from Pine Ridge (1937) as Bayliss Baynum
- Wild West Days (1937) as Matt Keeler
- Paradise Isle (1937) as Baxter
- Gold is Where You Find It (1938) as MacKenzie
- Valley of the Giants (1938) as McKenzie
- Heart of the North (1938) as Dave MacMillan
- Dodge City (1939) as Jack Orth
- Desperate Trails (1939) as Sheriff Big Bill Tanner
- Drums Along the Mohawk (1939) as Dr. Petry
- The Grapes of Wrath (1940) as Pa Joad
- Virginia City (1940) as Frank Gaylord
- Three Faces West (1940) as Minister
- Brigham Young (1940) as U.S. Army Major
- Tobacco Road (1941) as Chief of Police
- Citadel of Crime (1941) as Jess Meekins
- Bad Men of Missouri (1941) as Hank Younger
- Wild Geese Calling (1941) as Marshal Len Baker
- Last of the Duanes (1941) as Tom Duane
- Swamp Water (1941) as Marty McCord
- Nazi Agent (1942) as 2nd Captain (uncredited)
- Wild Bill Hickok Rides (1942) as Edward 'Ned' Nolan
- Shut My Big Mouth (1942) as Mayor Potter
- The Lone Star Ranger (1942) as Tom Duane
- The Spoilers (1942) as Flapjack Sims
- Tennessee Johnson (1942) as Kirby
- Border Patrol (1943) as Orestes Krebs
- Colt Comrades (1943) as Sheriff (uncredited)
- Moonlight in Vermont (1943) as Uncle Rufus
- The Woman of the Town (1943) as Sime
- Texas Masquerade (1944) as J.K. Trimble
- Man from Frisco (1944) as Dr. Hershey
- The Big Bonanza (1944) as Adam Parker
- Along Came Jones (1945) as Pop de Longpre
- Incendiary Blonde (1945) as Jenkins (uncredited)
- They Were Expendable (1945) as 'Dad' Knowland
- California Gold Rush (1946) as Colonel Parker
- Bad Bascomb (1946) as Elijah Walker
- Death Valley (1946) as Old Silas Bagley
- My Darling Clementine (1946) as John Simpson
- My Dog Shep (1946) as Matt Hodgkins
- A Boy and His Dog (1946, Short) as Mr. Thornycroft
- The Romance of Rosy Ridge (1947) as Dan Yeary
- Bowery Buckaroos (1947) as Sheriff Luke Barlow
- The Fabulous Texan (1947) as Wade Clayton
- Albuquerque (1948) as Abner Huggins
- Coroner Creek (1948) as Walt Hardison
- Tap Roots (1948) as Big Sam Dabney
- Sundown in Santa Fe (1948) as Sheriff Jim Wyatt
- Tuna Clipper (1949) as Capt. Fergus MacLennan
- The Gal Who Took the West (1949) as Bartender (as old Timer)
- Free for All (1949) as Farmer
- Wagon Master (1950) as Adam Perkins
- Saddle Tramp (1950) as Pop
- Call of the Klondike (1950) as Andy McKay
- Comin' Round the Mountain (1951) as Judge
- Lone Star (1952) as Senator Maynard Cole
- Ma and Pa Kettle at the Fair (1952) as Clem Johnson
- Feudin' Fools (1952) as Grandpa Smith
- Meet Me at the Fair (1953) as Sheriff Evans
- The Sun Shines Bright (1953) as Dr. Lewt Lake
- Seven Brides for Seven Brothers (1954) as Mr. Bixby
- Broken Lance (1954) as Judge (uncredited)
- The Last Command (1955) as The Parson
- The Brass Legend (1956) as Deputy 'Pop' Jackson
- Wagon Train (1956) as Mr Carr
- The Tin Star (1957) as Clem Hall
- The Horse Soldiers (1959) as Sheriff Goodbody
