= The Last of the Duanes (1930 film) =

1930 film

- Directed by: Alfred L. Werker
- Written by: Zane Grey (novel Last of the Duanes); Ernest Pascal (screenplay)
- Produced by: Edward Butcher (producer); Harold B. Lipsitz (producer)
- Starring: See below
- Cinematography: Daniel B. Clark
- Edited by: Ralph Dietrich
- Music by: Samuel Kaylin
- Distributed by: Fox Film Corporation
- Release date: August 31, 1930
- Running time: 54 minutes (USA); 62 minutes (American original version)
- Country: United States
- Language: English

The Last of the Duanes is a 1930 American pre-Code Western film produced and released by Fox Film Corporation, directed by Alfred L. Werker, and starring George O'Brien, Lucile Browne and Myrna Loy.

The film is based on Zane Grey's 1914 novel, Last of the Duanes. It is a remake of Fox's successful 1919 silent starring William Farnum and their 1924 silent remake starring Tom Mix. The novel was also adapted in 1941 starring George Montgomery.

== Cast ==
- George O'Brien as Buck Duane
- Lucile Browne as Ruth Garrett
- Myrna Loy as Lola
- Walter McGrail as Bland
- Clara Blandick as Mrs. Duane
- Frank Campeau as Luke Stevens
- Natalie Kingston as Morgan's girlfriend
- Jim Mason as Jim Morgan
- James Bradbury Jr. as Euchre
- Lloyd Ingraham as Mr. Garrett
- Willard Robertson as Texas Ranger Captain

== Soundtrack ==
- "Cowboy Dan" (Written by Cliff Friend)
- "The Outlaw Song" (Written by Cliff Friend)
