= The Adventurer (1920 film) =

1920 silent drama film

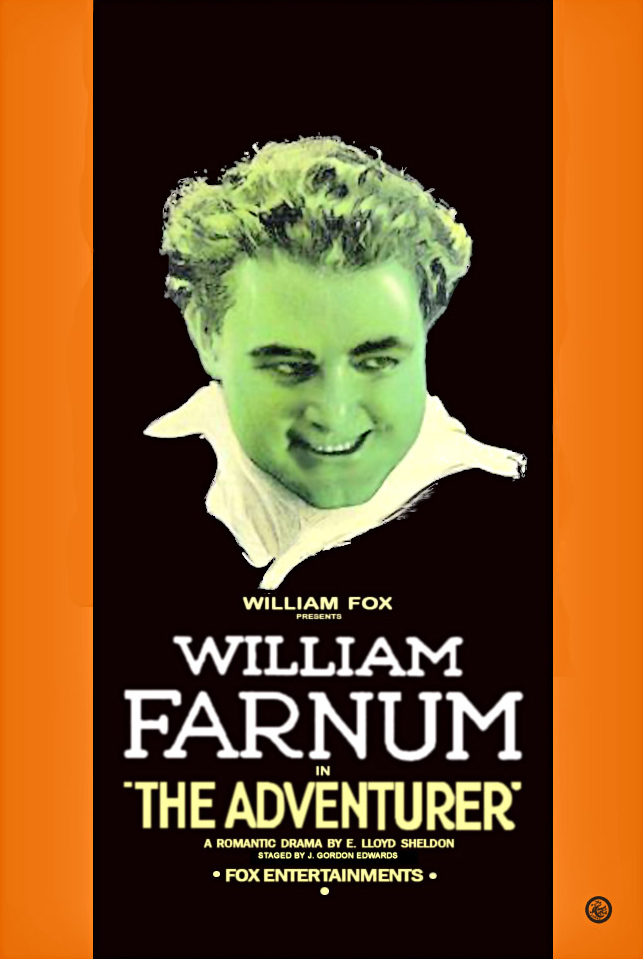
Theatrical release poster

The Adventurer is a 1920 American silent drama film directed by J. Gordon Edwards and starring William Farnum. The film was produced by William Fox and distributed by Fox Film.

== Plot ==
Swashbuckling Spanish nobleman Don Caesar de Bazan falls for gypsy dancer Maritana, rescuing her from an insult, leading them to Madrid where King Charles also takes notice; the villainous Prime Minister Don Jose schemes to get Maritana for the King by forcing her to marry the imprisoned Caesar, who agrees to a sham marriage, only to face a staged firing squad (saved by a youth with blanks), ultimately proving his worth and becoming Prime Minister himself.

== Cast ==
- William Farnum as Don Caesar de Bazan
- Estelle Taylor as Maritana
- Paul Cazeneuve as Don Jose

== Preservation Status ==
With no record of any prints of The Adventurer located in any film archives, it is considered a lost film.

== Reception ==
The American Film Institute lists 6 contemporary reviews and mentions similarities with a 1915 Kalem Company film, Don Caesar de Bazan, recalling that the name of the character comes from Victor Hugo’s Ruy Blas.
