= Lone Star Ranger =

1942 film directed by James Tinling

- Theatrical release poster
- Directed by: James Tinling
- Screenplay by: William Conselman Jr. Irving Cummings Jr. George Kane
- Based on: the 1915 novel, The Lone Star Ranger by: Zane Grey
- Produced by: Sol M. Wurtzel
- Starring: John Kimbrough; Sheila Ryan; Jonathan Hale; William Farnum; Truman Bradley; George E. Stone
- Cinematography: Lucien N. Andriot
- Edited by: Nick DeMaggio
- Music by: Cyril J. Mockridge
- Production company: 20th Century-Fox
- Distributed by: 20th Century-Fox
- Release date: March 20, 1942
- Running time: 58 minutes
- Country: United States
- Language: English

Lone Star Ranger is a 1942 American Western film directed by James Tinling and written by William Conselman Jr., Irving Cummings Jr. and George Kane. The film stars John Kimbrough, Sheila Ryan, Jonathan Hale, William Farnum, Truman Bradley and George E. Stone. The film was released on March 20, 1942, by 20th Century-Fox. It was the fourth and final film adaptation of the novel of the same name by Zane Grey. William Farnum had appeared in the first adaptation of the novel, a 1919 silent film of the same name. In that version he had starred in the leading role, which was named "Steele", who avenged the murder of Major McNeil, which is the role he plays in this film.

== Cast ==
- John Kimbrough as Buck Duane
- Sheila Ryan as Barbara Longstreth
- Jonathan Hale as Judge [John] Longstreth
- William Farnum as Major McNeil
- Truman Bradley as Phil Lawson
- George E. Stone as Euchre
- Russell Simpson as Tom Duane
- Dorothy Burgess as Trixie
- Tom Fadden as Sam
- Fred Kohler Jr. as Red [Morgan]
- Eddy C. Waller as Clem Mitchell
- Harry Hayden as Sheriff
- George Melford as Jim Hardin
- Tom London as Fletcher
- Eva Puig as Maria
- Jeff Corey as Clerk
- Robert Homans as Bartender
- Herbert Ashley as Bartender
- Alec Craig as Mr. Strong
- Almira Sessions as Mrs. Strong
- Syd Saylor as Hotel clerk
