= The Lone Star Ranger =

1915 novel by Zane Grey

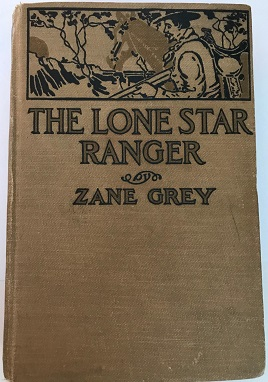
- Cover of the Grosset & Dunlap version (1915)
- Author: Zane Grey
- Language: English
- Genre: Western novel
- Publisher: Harper & Brothers
- Publication date: January 1915
- Publication place: New York City, New York, United States
- Media type: Print
- Pages: 373
- OCLC: 250090115

The Lone Star Ranger is a Western novel published by Zane Grey in 1915. The book takes place in Texas, the Lone Star State, and several main characters are Texan outlaws. It follows the life of Buck Duane, a man who becomes an outlaw and then redeems himself in the eyes of the law.

The novel was dedicated to Texas Ranger John Hughes.

== Plot introduction ==
Buck Duane is the son of a famous outlaw. Though an outlaw is not always a criminal, if the Rangers say he is an outlaw, it's just as bad – he's a hunted man. After killing a man in self-defense, Duane is forced to 'go on the dodge'. Duane turns up at an outlaw's hideout, still revolting at the idea of outlawry. Worse still, all the men he kills haunt him, for years. At the outlaw hideout, he meets a kidnapped, beautiful young woman and wants to see her free.

In the second part of the book, Duane joins the Rangers. They offer to get a governor's pardon for his illegal deeds if he will help to clear the frontier of major cattle rustlers and bank robbers.

== Characters ==
- Buckley "Buck" Duane – The main protagonist. A young, gunslinging outlaw with a good heart who never kills an innocent man.
- Luke Stevens – A friendly outlaw who befriends Buck shortly after he is forced to flee his hometown.
- Bland – an outlaw gang leader who runs a large cattle rustling operation out of a lawless community in a valley.
- Kate Bland – the cruel wife of Bland.
- Euchre – an aged outlaw who takes in Buck following his arrival at Bland's community.
- Jennie – a girl held captive by the Blands.
- "Jackrabbit" Benson – a wanted criminal who runs a taproom within Bland's community.
- Chess Alloway – an outlaw lieutenant in Bland's gang.
- Hardin – an outlaw gang leader who leads a gang of cattle rustlers.
- Cheselidine – an elusive outlaw chief.
- Rodney Brown – an unscrupulous and vindictive cattle rustler.
- King Fisher – a prominent outlaw gang leader with a reputation.
- MacNelly – a Texas Ranger captain who seeks out Buck.

== Film, TV or theatrical adaptations ==
The novel has been adapted at least four times to film:

- The Lone Star Ranger (1919 film), American silent film western directed by J. Gordon Edwards and starring William Farnum
- The Lone Star Ranger (1923 film), American silent film western directed by Lambert Hillyer and starring Tom Mix
- The Lone Star Ranger (1930 film), American western film directed by A.F. Erickson and starring George O'Brien
- Lone Star Ranger, a 1942 American western film directed by James Tinling and starring John Kimbrough

== Comic book ==
In 1949, Dell Comics published a comic book adaptation called "The Ranger" in Four Color #255, written by Gaylord Du Bois.

== See also ==
- Last of the Duanes
