= The Lone Star Ranger (1923 film) =

1923 film

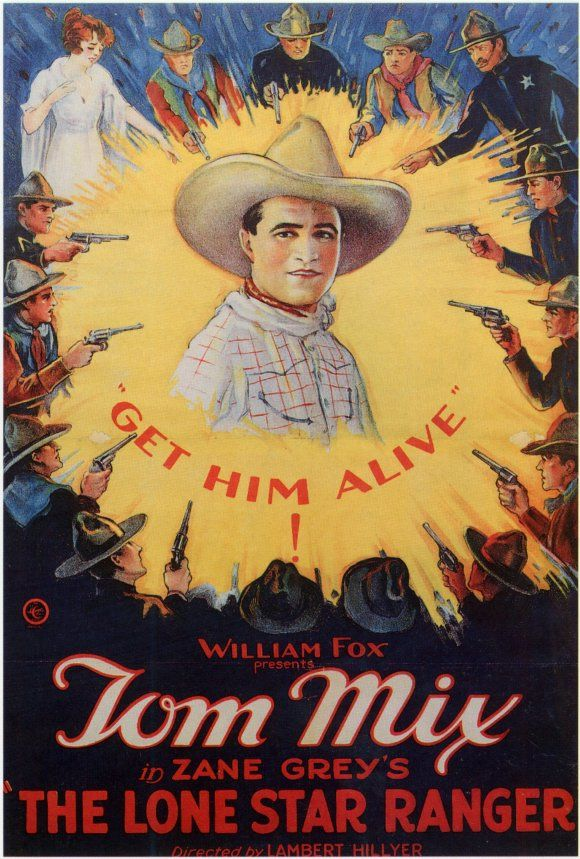
- Directed by: Lambert Hillyer
- Written by: Lambert Hillyer (scenario)
- Based on: novel by, The Lone Star Ranger, by Zane Grey c. 1915
- Produced by: William Fox
- Starring: Tom Mix
- Cinematography: Daniel B. Clark
- Distributed by: Fox Film Corporation
- Release date: September 9, 1923
- Running time: 60 minutes
- Country: United States
- Languages: Silent; English intertitles

The Lone Star Ranger is a lost 1923 American silent Western film directed by Lambert Hillyer and starring Tom Mix. It is based on the 1915 novel by Zane Grey. Fox produced and distributed by Fox Films and this film is a remake of their 1919 film with William Farnum.

== Cast ==
- Tom Mix as Buck Duane
- Tony the Horse as Tony, Buck Duane's Horse
- Billie Dove as Helen Longstreth
- Lee Shumway as Lawson (as L. C. Shumway)
- Stanton Heck as Poggin
- Edward Peil Sr. as Kane (as Edward Peil)
- Frank Clark as Laramie
- Minna Redman as Mrs. Laramie
- Francis Carpenter as Laramie's Son
- William Conklin as Major Longstreth
- Thomas G. Lingham as Captain McNally (as Thomas Lingham)

== See also ==
- 1937 Fox vault fire
