= Last of the Duanes (1941 film) =

1941 film by James Tinling

- Theatrical release poster
- Directed by: James Tinling
- Screenplay by: William Conselman Jr. Irving Cummings Jr.
- Based on: Last of the Duanes; 1914 story by Zane Grey
- Produced by: Sol M. Wurtzel
- Starring: George Montgomery; Lynne Roberts; Eve Arden; Francis Ford; George E. Stone; William Farnum
- Cinematography: Charles G. Clarke
- Edited by: Nick DeMaggio
- Music by: David Buttolph
- Production company: 20th Century Fox
- Distributed by: 20th Century Fox
- Release date: September 26, 1941
- Running time: 57 minutes
- Country: United States
- Language: English

Last of the Duanes is a 1941 American Western film based on the novel by Zane Grey directed by James Tinling and written by William Conselman Jr. and Irving Cummings Jr. The film stars George Montgomery, Lynne Roberts, Eve Arden, Francis Ford, George E. Stone and William Farnum. The film was released on September 26, 1941, by 20th Century Fox.

The film was based on a 1941 Zane Grey novel, Last of the Duanes. This was the final of four films based on the novel; a 1919 silent film adaptation starred William Farnum, a 1924 adaptation starred Tom Mix, and a 1930 adaptation starred George O'Brien.

== Cast ==
- George Montgomery as Buck Duane
- Lynne Roberts as Nancy Bowdrey
- Eve Arden as Kate
- Francis Ford as Luke Stevens
- George E. Stone as Euchre
- William Farnum as Texas Ranger Major McNeil
- Joe Sawyer as Bull Lossomer
- Truman Bradley as Texas Ranger Capt. Laramie
- Russell Simpson as Tom Duane
- Don Costello as Jim Bland
- Harry Woods as Sheriff Red Morgan
- Andrew Tombes as Sheriff Frank Taylor
