= The Last of the Duanes (1919 film) =

1919 film directed by J. Gordon Edwards

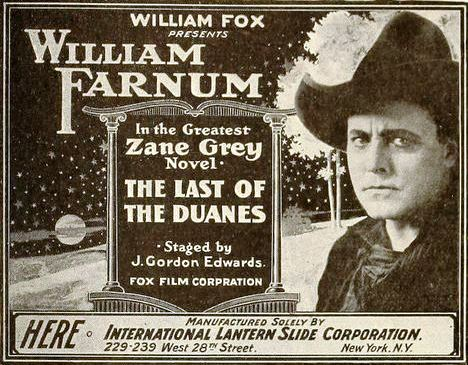
- ad on lantern slide
- Directed by: J. Gordon Edwards
- Written by: Charles Kenyon
- Based on: Last of the Duanes by Zane Grey
- Produced by: William Fox
- Starring: William Farnum; Louise Lovely
- Cinematography: John W. Boyle; Richard W. Maedler
- Distributed by: Fox Film
- Release date: September 14, 1919
- Running time: 75 minutes
- Country: United States
- Languages: Silent; English intertitles

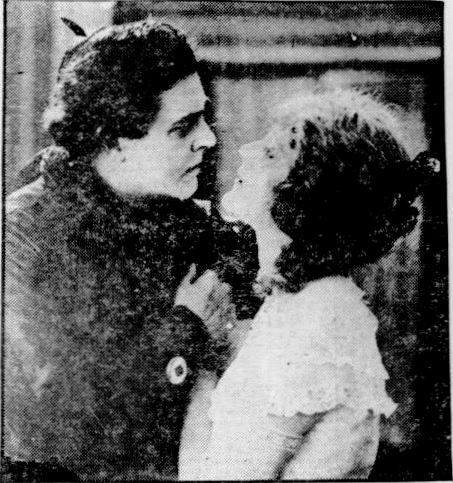
William Farnum and Louise Lovely.

The Last of the Duanes is a lost 1919 silent film western directed by J. Gordon Edwards and starring William Farnum. It is based on the 1914 novel Last of the Duanes by author Zane Grey. The Fox Film Corporation produced and distributed the film.

This was the first of four films based on the novel; a 1924 adaptation starred Tom Mix, a 1930 adaptation starred George O'Brien, and a 1941 adaptation featured George Montgomery.

== Cast ==
- William Farnum as Buck Duane
- Louise Lovely as Jenny Lee
- Harry De Vere as His Uncle
- Charles Clary as Cheseldine
- G. Raymond Nye as Poggin
- Clarence Burton as Bland
- Lamar Johnstone as Captain Neil
- Henry J. Hebert as Cal Bain
- C. Edward Hatton as Stevens
- Genevieve Blinn as Mrs Lee

== See also ==
1937 Fox vault fire
