= The Lone Star Ranger (1919 film) =

1919 film directed by J. Gordon Edwards

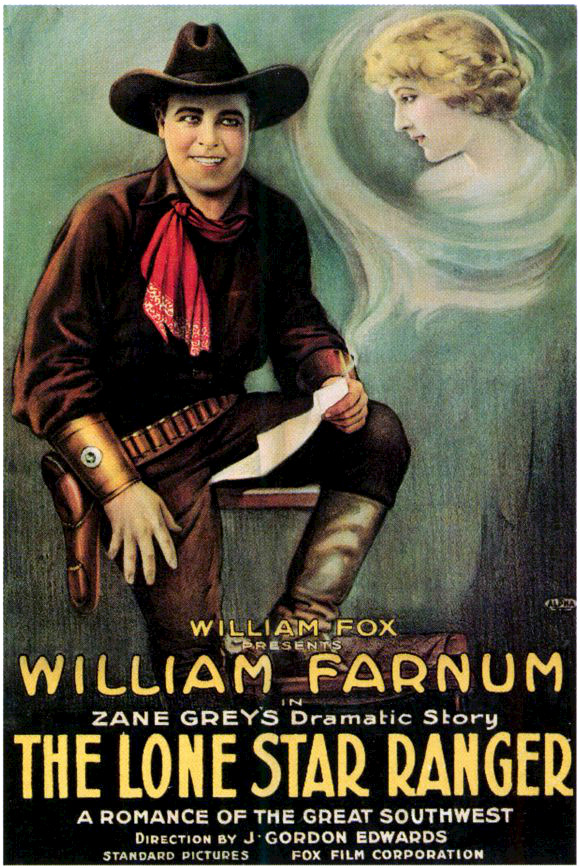
- Film poster
- Directed by: J. Gordon Edwards
- Written by: Lambert Hillyer
- Based on: The Lone Star Ranger by Zane Grey
- Produced by: William Fox
- Starring: William Farnum
- Cinematography: Daniel B. Clark
- Distributed by: Fox Film
- Release date: June 29, 1919
- Running time: 6 reels
- Country: United States
- Languages: Silent; English intertitles

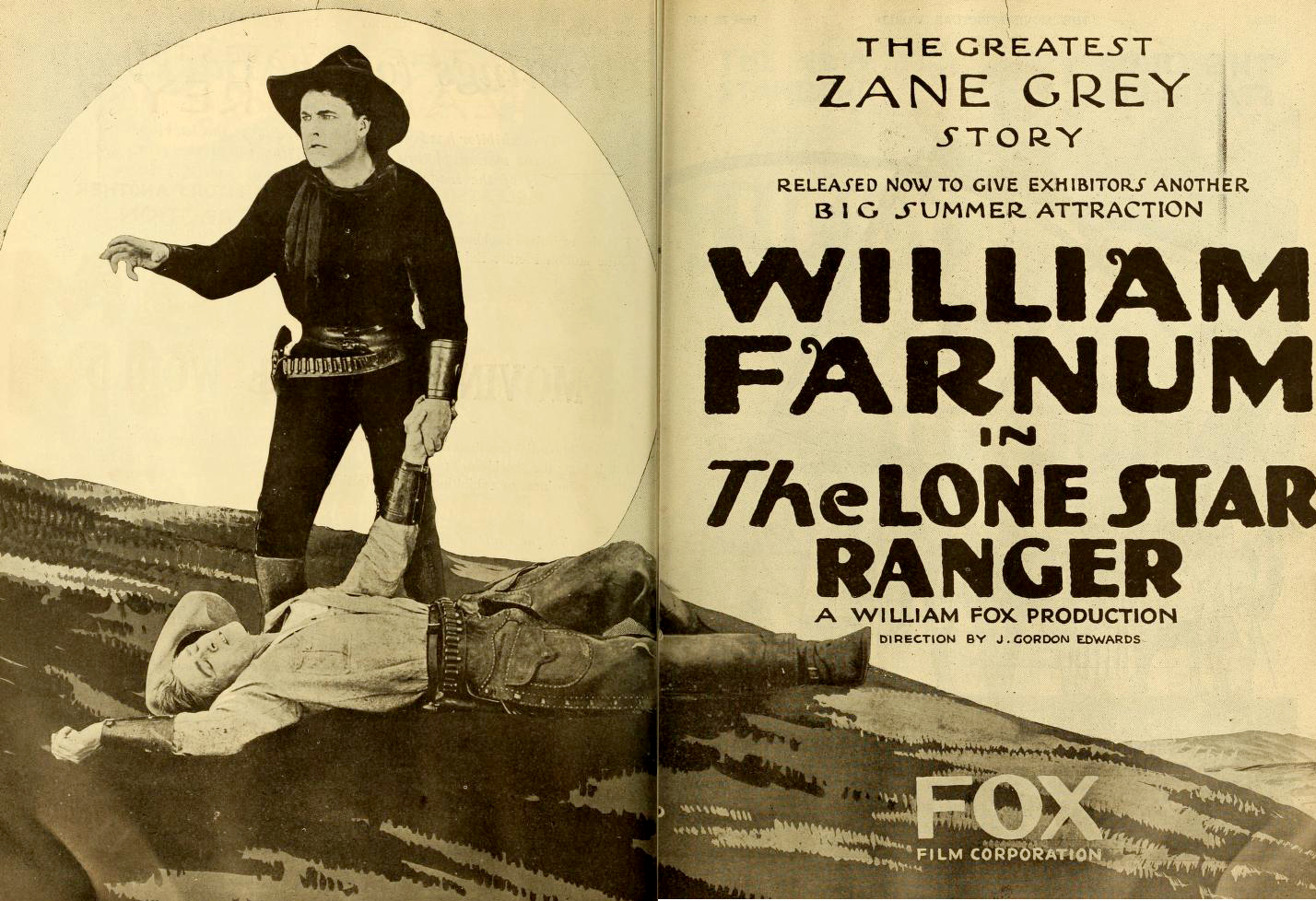
contemporary advertisement.

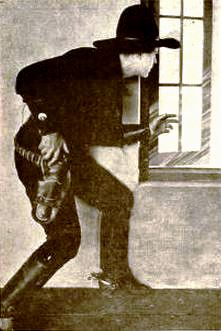
Farnum poised to take action.

The Lone Star Ranger is a lost 1919 American silent Western film based on the 1915 novel by Zane Grey and stars William Farnum. The film was directed by J. Gordon Edwards and produced and distributed by Fox Film Corporation.

Just 3 years after the release of the film, Fox dusted off the script and refilmed the story with Tom Mix.

== Plot ==
As described in a film magazine, Cyrus Longstreth (Clary), Bully Brome (Nye), and Jeff Lawson (Johnstone), a trio of unprincipled cattlemen, have defied law and order in their cattle rustling activities. Steele (Farnum), a Texas ranger, entering the village alone and under an assumed name, rescues Longstreth's daughter Ray (Lovely) from two Mexican assailants and wins her father's gratitude. After one of the trio murders Steele's best friend, he enters the locality alone, goes to work at Longstreth's ranch, and wins Ray's heart. After several thrilling fights, Steele manages to dispose of Brome and confronts Lawson and Longstreth with a charge of murder. Lawson betrays his guilt and is killed in the fight that follows. Longstreth proves his part in the rustling was an involuntary one and Steele and Ray are married.

== Cast ==
- William Farnum as Steele
- Louise Lovely as Ray Longstreth
- G. Raymond Nye as Bully Brome
- Charles Clary as Cyrus Longstreth, alias Cheseldine
- Lamar Johnstone as Jeff Lawson
- Fred Herzog as Joe Laramie (credited as Frederic Herzog)
- Irene Rich as Mrs. Laramie
- Tom London (unknown role) (credited as Leonard Clapham)

== Production ==
Seven weeks of the production were spent filming on location in Palm Springs, California.

== Reception ==
Variety found the directing and story to be above average, but criticized the technical aspects of the film. The reviewer described the lab work as having a "lack of superiority" and "Fox laboratory men seem to have no idea of giving an even tone to their product, and Fox cameramen use the circle vignette like amateurs."

Moving Picture World reviewer Robert C. McElravy's review was positive, writing of the story "There is a certain reality about this type of narrative, pictured in a background of sweeping plains country, which will not let it grow old."

== See also ==
- 1937 Fox vault fire
