= William Farnum =

American actor (1876–1953)

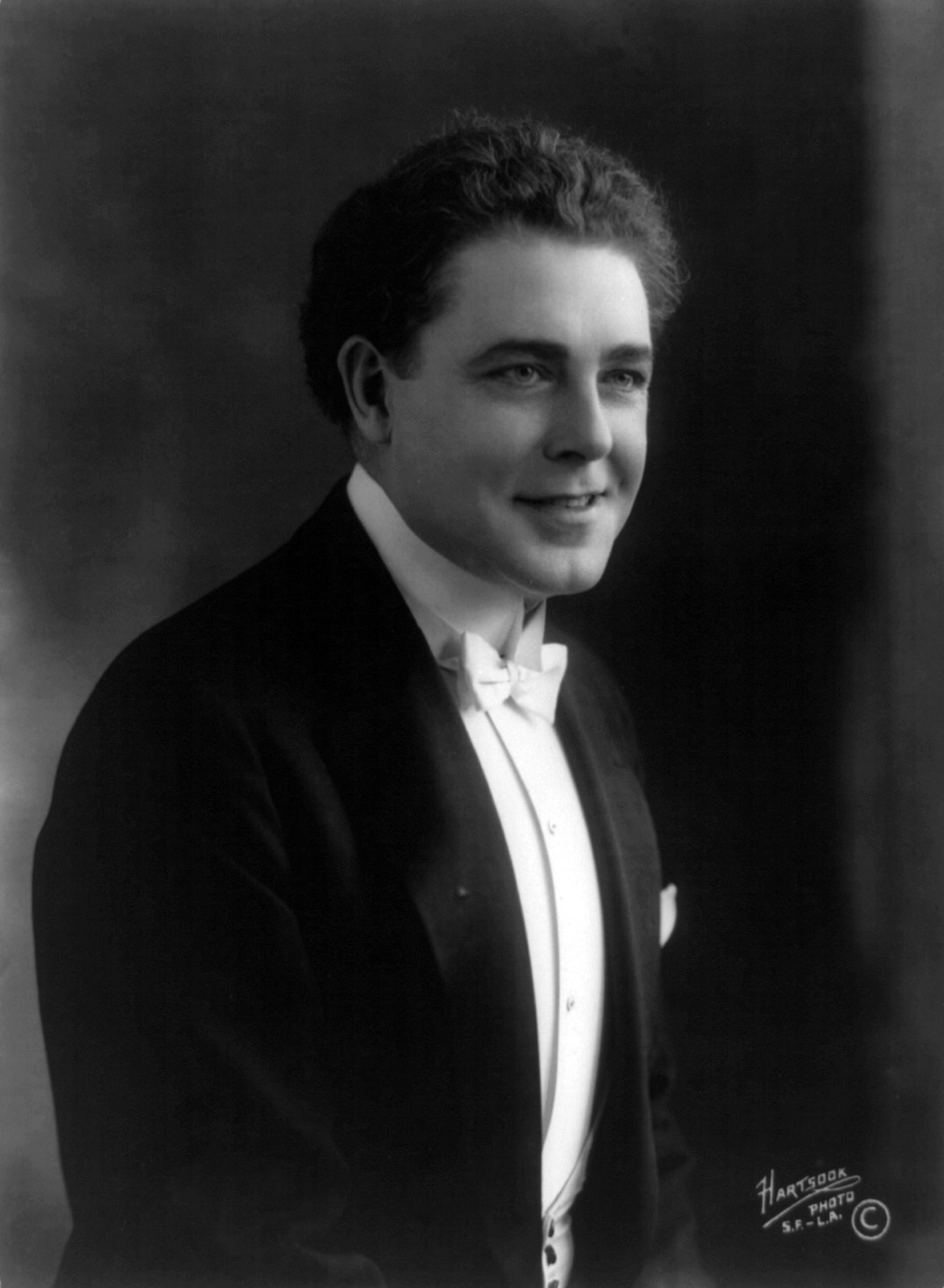
- Farnum in 1917
- Born: July 4, 1876; Boston, Massachusetts, U.S.
- Died: June 5, 1953 (aged 76); Los Angeles, California, U.S.
- Resting place: Forest Lawn Memorial Park, Glendale, California
- Occupation: Actor
- Years active: 1900–1952
- Spouse(s): Mabel Eaton (m. ??; div. ??) Olive White (m. 1906; div. 1931) Isabelle Major (m. 1932)
- Children: 5, including Dorothy Farnum
- Relatives: Dustin Farnum (brother); Marshall Farnum (brother)

William Farnum (July 4, 1876 – June 5, 1953) was an American actor. He was a star of American silent cinema, and he became one of the highest-paid actors during this time.

== Biography ==
Farnum was born on July 4, 1876, in Boston, Massachusetts, but he grew up in Bucksport, Maine.

One of three brothers, Farnum grew up in a family of actors. He made his acting debut at the age of 10 in Richmond, Virginia, in a production of Julius Caesar, with Edwin Booth playing the title character.

He portrayed the title character of Ben-Hur (1900) on Broadway. Later plays Farnum appeared in there included The Prince of India (1906), The White Sister (1909), The Littlest Rebel (1911) co-starring his brother Dustin and Viola Savoy, and Arizona (1913), also with Dustin.

In The Spoilers in 1914, Farnum and Tom Santschi staged a film fight which lasted for a full reel. In 1930, Farnum and Santschi coached Gary Cooper and William Boyd in the fight scene for the 1930 version of The Spoilers. Other actors influenced by the Farnum/Santschi scene were Milton Sills and Noah Beery in 1923 and Randolph Scott and John Wayne in 1942.

From 1915 to 1952, Farnum devoted his life to motion pictures. He became one of the highest-paid actors in Hollywood, earning $10,000 per week. Farnum's silent pictures Drag Harlan (1920) and If I Were King (1921) survive from his years contracted to Fox Films. Nearly all of Fox's silent films made before 1932 were destroyed in the 1937 Fox vault fire.

== Personal life ==
Married three times, Farnum was the father of screenwriter Dorothy Farnum with Mabel Eaton. He had a daughter, named Sara Adele, with Olive White, his second wife. He had three children with Isabelle, his third wife.

Farnum died from uremia and cancer on June 5, 1953, at Cedars of Lebanon Hospital. He is interred at Forest Lawn Memorial Park in Glendale, California.

On February 8, 1960, Farnum received a star on the Hollywood Walk of Fame for his contributions to the motion-picture industry at 6322 Hollywood Boulevard.

He was the younger brother of film actor Dustin Farnum. He had another brother, Marshall Farnum, who was a silent film director.

== Filmography ==
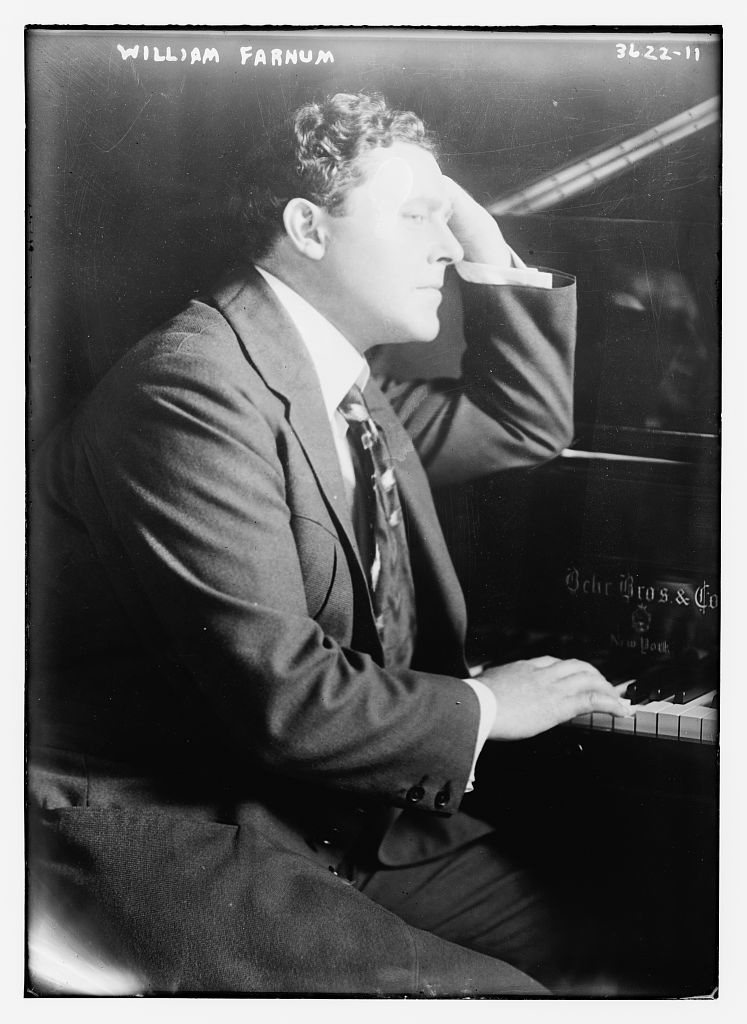
William Farnum at a piano in 1915

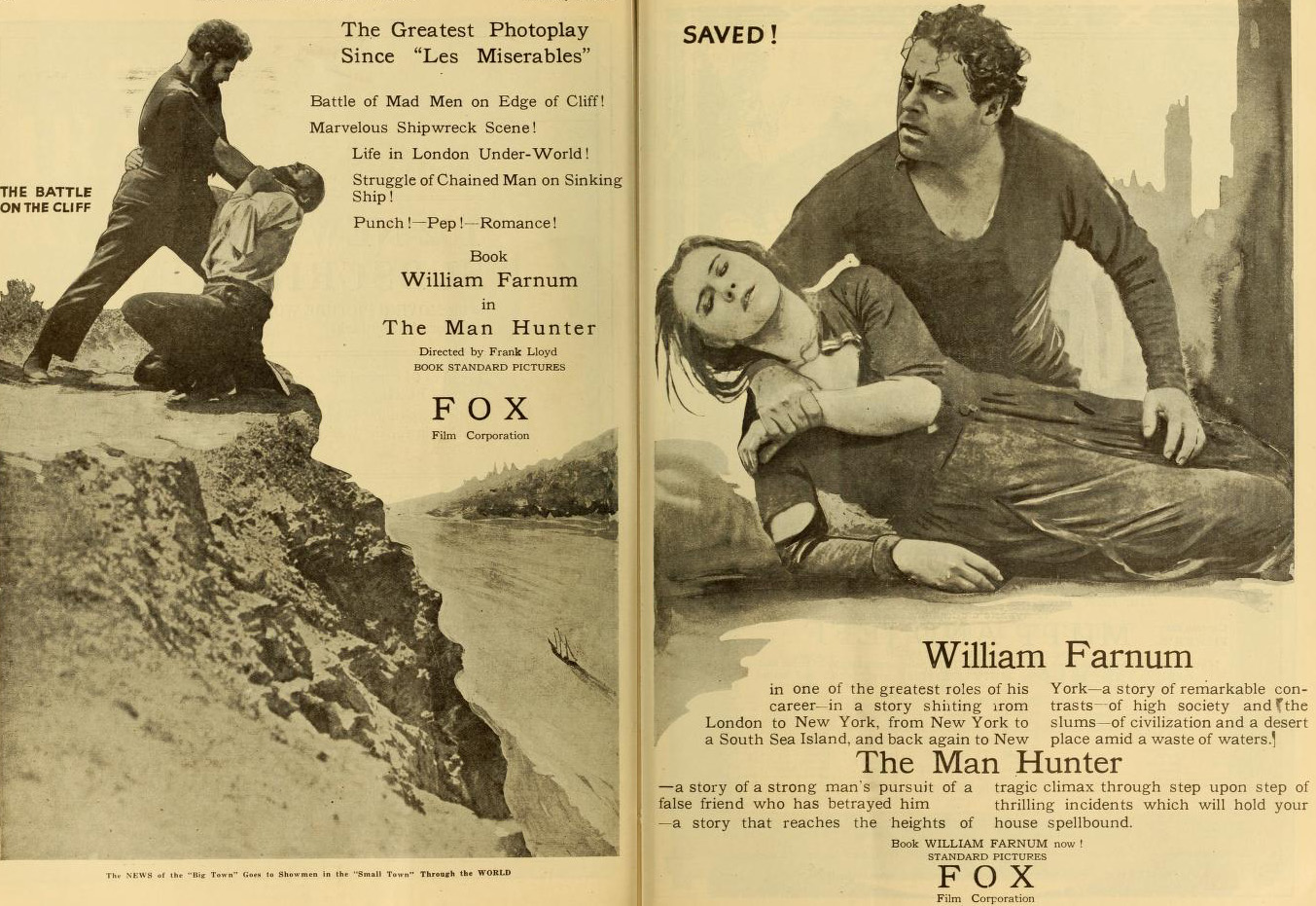
The Man Hunter (1919)

=== Silent ===
- The Redemption of David Corson (1914, Short) as David Corson
- The Spoilers (1914) as Roy Glenister
- The Sign of the Cross (1914, extant; Library of Congress) as Marcus Superbus
- Samson (1915) as Maurice Brachard
- A Gilded Fool (1915) as Chauncey Short
- The Nigger aka The New Governor (1915) as Philip Morrow
- The Plunderer (1915) as Bill Matthews
- The Wonderful Adventure (1915) as Martin Stanley / Wilton Demarest
- The Broken Law (1915) as Daniel Esmond - later Known as Lavengro
- A Soldier's Oath (1915) as Pierre Duval
- Fighting Blood (1916) as Lem Hardy
- The Bondman (1916) as Stephen Orry / Jason Orry
- A Man of Sorrow (1916) as Jack Hewlitt
- The Battle of Hearts (1916) as Martin Cane
- The Man from Bitter Roots (1916) as Bruce Burt
- The End of the Trail (1916) as Jules Le Clerq
- The Fires of Conscience (1916) as George Baxter
- The Price of Silence (1917) as Senator Frank Deering
- A Tale of Two Cities (1917) as Charles Darnay/Sydney Carton
- American Methods (1917) as William Armstrong
- The Conqueror (1917) as Sam Houston
- When a Man Sees Red (1917) as Larry Smith
- Les Misérables (1917) as Jean Valjean
- The Heart of a Lion (1917) as Barney Kemper
- The Scarlet Car (1917) as Billy Winthrop
- Rough and Ready (1918) as Bill Stratton
- True Blue (1918) as Bob McKeever
- Riders of the Purple Sage (1918) as Lassiter
- The Rainbow Trail (1918) as Lassiter/Shefford
- For Freedom (1918) as Robert Wayne
- The Man Hunter (1919) as George Arnold
- The Jungle Trail (1919) as Robert Morgan
- The Lone Star Ranger (1919) as Steele
- Wolves of the Night (1919) as Bruce Andrews
- The Last of the Duanes (1919) as Buck Duane
- Wings of the Morning (1919) as Capt. Robert Anstruther/Robert Jenks
- Heart Strings (1920) as Pierre Fournel
- The Adventurer (1920) as Don Caesar de Bazan
- The Orphan (1920) as The Orphan
- The Joyous Trouble-Makers (1920) as William Steele
- If I Were King (1920) as François Villon
- Drag Harlan (1920) as Drag Harlan
- The Scuttlers (1920) as Jim Landers
- His Greatest Sacrifice (1921) as Richard Hall
- Perjury (1921) as Robert Moore
- A Stage Romance (1922) as Edmund Kean (Character)
- Shackles of Gold (1922) as John Gibbs
- Moonshine Valley (1922) as Ned Connors
- Without Compromise (1922) as Dick Leighton
- Brass Commandments (1923) as Stephen 'Flash' Lanning
- The Gunfighter (1923) as Billy Buell
- The Man Who Fights Alone (1924) as John Marble
- Tropical Nights (1928)

=== Sound ===
- The Spoilers (1930) as Fight Spectator
- Du Barry, Woman of Passion (1930) as Louis XV
- The Painted Desert (1931) as Cash Holbrook
- Ten Nights in a Barroom (1931) as Joe Morgan
- A Connecticut Yankee (1931) as King Arthur/Inventor
- The Pagan Lady (1931) as Malcolm 'Mal' Todd
- Law of the Sea (1931) as Captain Len Andrews
- The Drifter (1932) as The Drifter
- Mr. Robinson Crusoe (1932) as William Belmont
- Flaming Guns (1932) as Henry Ramsey
- Supernatural (1933) as Nick 'Nicky' Hammond
- Fighting with Kit Carson (1933, Serial) as Elliott (Ch. 1)
- Another Language (1933) as C. Forrester (uncredited)
- Marriage on Approval (1933) as Reverend John MacDougall
- Good Dame (1934) as Judge Flynn
- School for Girls (1934) as Charles Waltham
- Are We Civilized? (1934) as Paul Franklin, Sr.
- The Count of Monte Cristo (1934) as Captain Leclere
- Happy Landing (1934) as Col. Curtis
- The Scarlet Letter (1934) as Gov. Bellingham
- Cleopatra (1934) as Lepidus
- The Brand of Hate (1934) as Joe Larkins
- The Silver Streak (1934) as Barney J. Dexter
- Million Dollar Haul (1935) as Mr. Mallory, Sheila's Dad
- The Crusades (1935) as Hugo, Duke of Burgundy
- Powdersmoke Range (1935) as Sam Oreham - Banker
- The Eagle's Brood (1935) as El Toro
- Between Men (1935) as John Wellington, aka Rand
- The Irish Gringo (1935) as Pop Wiley
- The Fighting Coward (1935) as Jim Horton
- Custer's Last Stand (1936, Serial) as James Fitzpatrick
- The Kid Ranger (1936) as Bill Mason
- The Clutching Hand (1936, Serial) as Gordon Gaunt
- Undersea Kingdom (1936, Serial) as Sharad
- Hollywood Boulevard (1936, scenes deleted)
- The Vigilantes Are Coming (1936, Serial) as Father José
- Maid of Salem (1937) as Crown Justice Sewall
- Git Along Little Dogies (1937) as Mr. Maxwell
- Public Cowboy No. 1 (1937) as Sheriff Matt Doniphon
- The Lone Ranger (1938, Serial) as Father McKim
- If I Were King (1938) as General Barbezier
- Santa Fe Stampede (1938) as Dave Carson
- Shine On, Harvest Moon (1938) as Milt Brower
- Mexicali Rose (1939) as Padre Dominic
- Should Husbands Work? (1939) as Friend
- Colorado Sunset (1939) as Sheriff George Glenn
- Rovin' Tumbleweeds (1939) as Senator Timothy Nolan
- South of the Border (1939) as Padre
- Convicted Woman (1940) as Commissioner McNeill
- Adventures of Red Ryder (1940, Serial) as Colonel Tom Ryder [Ch. 1]
- Kit Carson (1940) as Don Miguel Murphy
- Hi-Yo Silver (1940) as Father McKim (archive footage)
- The Villain Still Pursued Her (1940) as Vagabond
- Cheers for Miss Bishop (1941) as Judge Peters
- A Woman's Face (1941) as Court Attendant
- Gangs of Sonora (1941) as Ward Beecham
- Last of the Duanes (1941) as Texas Ranger Major McNeil
- The Corsican Brothers (1941) as Priest
- Today I Hang (1942) as Warden Burke
- The Lone Star Ranger (1942) as Texas Ranger Major McNeil
- The Spoilers (1942) as Wheaton
- Men of Texas (1942) as General Sam Houston
- The Silver Bullet (1942) as Dr. Thad Morgan
- Boss of Hangtown Mesa (1942) as Judge Ezra Binns
- Tish (1942) as John
- Deep in the Heart of Texas (1942) as Colonel Mallory
- American Empire (1942) as Louisiana Judge
- Tennessee Johnson (1942) as Senator Huyler
- Calaboose (1943) as Checkers Player
- Prairie Chickens (1943) as Cache Lake Townsman
- Hangmen Also Die! (1943) as Viktorin
- Frontier Badmen (1943) as Dad Courtwright
- The Mummy's Curse (1944) as Sacristan
- Wildfire (1945) as Judge Polson
- Captain Kidd (1945) as Capt. Rawson
- God's Country (1946) as Sandy McTavish
- Rolling Home (1946) as Rodeo Official
- My Dog Shep (1946) as Carter J. Latham
- The Perils of Pauline (1947) as Western Saloon Set Hero
- Heaven Only Knows (1947) as Gabriel
- Daughter of the West (1949) as Father Vallejo
- Bride of Vengeance (1949) as Conti Peruzzi
- Samson and Delilah (1949) as Tubal
- Gun Cargo (1949) as Board of Inquiry Chairman
- Trail of Robin Hood (1950) as Bill Franum
- Hollywood Story (1951) as Himself
- Lone Star (1952) as Senator Tom Crockett
- Jack and the Beanstalk (1952) as The King
