= The Blindness of Divorce =

1918 film

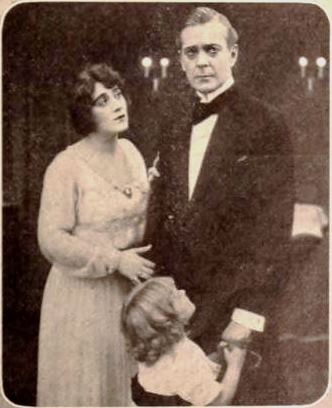
- Directed by: Frank Lloyd
- Written by: Frank Lloyd
- Produced by: William Fox
- Starring: Charles Clary; Rhea Mitchell; Nancy Caswell
- Cinematography: William C. Foster
- Production company: Fox Film
- Distributed by: Fox Film
- Release date: March 6, 1918
- Country: United States
- Languages: Silent; English intertitles

The Blindness of Divorce is a 1918 American silent drama film directed by Frank Lloyd and starring Charles Clary, Rhea Mitchell, and Nancy Caswell.

== Cast ==
- Charles Clary as John Langdon
- Rhea Mitchell as Florence Langdon
- Nancy Caswell as Florence Langdon - as a child
- Bertram Grassby as Stanley Merrill
- Marc B. Robbins as Edward Hopkins
- Willard Louis as Robert White
- Fred Church as Burce Livingston
- Al Fremont as Chief Detective
- Bertha Mann as Claire Langdon

== Bibliography ==
- Solomon, Aubrey. The Fox Film Corporation, 1915-1935: A History and Filmography. McFarland, 2011.
