= Drag (1929 film) =

1929 film by Frank Lloyd

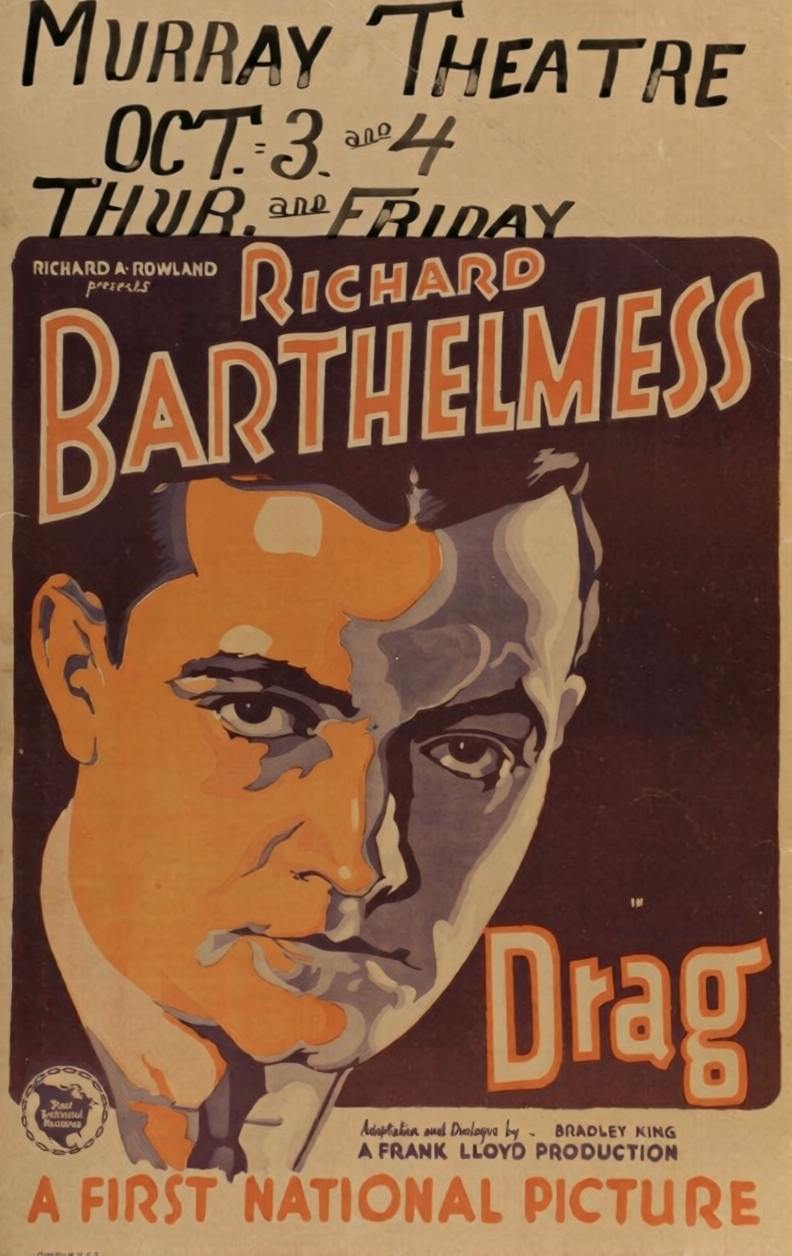
- Theatrical release poster
- Directed by: Frank Lloyd
- Screenplay by: Bradley King (and dialogue)
- Based on: Drag: A Comedy (1925 novel) by William Dudley Pelley
- Produced by: Richard A. Rowland
- Starring: Richard Barthelmess; Lucien Littlefield; Kathrin Clare Ward
- Cinematography: Ernest Haller
- Edited by: Edward Schroeder
- Music by: George W. Meyer; Peter Brunelli (uncredited); Cecil Copping (uncredited); Al Bryan
- Production company: First National Pictures
- Distributed by: Warner Bros. Pictures
- Release date: July 21, 1929
- Running time: 85 minutes
- Country: United States
- Language: English

Drag (Parasites in the UK) is a 1929 American sound (All-Talking) pre-Code drama film produced by Richard A. Rowland and directed by Frank Lloyd based on the 1925 novel Drag: A Comedy by William Dudley Pelley. It stars Richard Barthelmess and Lucien Littlefield.

== Plot ==
David Carroll arrives in the small town of Paris, Vermont, to take over the local newspaper, The Courier. He rents a room in the home of Mrs. Parker, whose family quickly becomes entangled in his life.

The following day, David meets Dot, the town's most sophisticated young woman. Though initially wishing him polite luck, Dot finds herself unexpectedly intrigued by him.

Before long, David is all but maneuvered into marrying Allie Parker, Mrs. Parker's daughter. When he proposes they live independently, Allie refuses to leave her family home. Her father then suggests David pay off the $2,000 mortgage and move in with them. Reluctantly, David agrees—and soon finds himself married and living under the same roof with Allie's entire intrusive family, including Charlie, Clara, and even the baby.

Despite the domestic chaos, David throws himself into revitalizing The Courier, and also writes a musical play for the Paris Ladies’ Guild. The production is a local hit, earning him brief satisfaction.

But home life becomes intolerable. Allie constantly sides with her meddling parents and siblings, leaving David increasingly frustrated. Finally, he announces that he is going to New York to try his luck promoting the play—and to escape the suffocating Parker household. Allie refuses to accompany him, so David departs alone, promising to send for her when he can afford to.

In New York, David crosses paths with Dot, now a successful costume designer in the theater world. By coincidence, they meet in the office of a producer whom David is trying to interest in his play. Thanks to Dot's influence, the play is accepted and David achieves success. He rents a beautiful apartment and sends for Allie, determined to honor his marriage.

Though he and Dot have fallen in love, David remains committed to his vows. Understanding this, Dot quietly exits his life, telling him she is sailing to France.

When Allie finally arrives in New York, David hopes they can begin anew—free of her family. But a knock at the door reveals the Parkers, who have followed her. Enraged, David gives Allie an ultimatum: either she severs ties with her family or their marriage is over. Once again, Allie chooses her parents.

Resigned, David hands over the lease to the apartment, telling the Parkers they can have it—or ruin it—because he's done. He rushes to the docks, where the ship Aquitania is preparing to depart. As it pulls away, he declares to the world—and to himself—that he is free.

== Cast ==
- Richard Barthelmess as David Carroll
- Lucien Littlefield as Pa Parker
- Kathrin Clare Ward as Ma Parker
- Alice Day as Allie Parker
- Tom Dugan as Charlie Parker
- Lila Lee as Dot
- Margaret Fielding as Clara
- Garry Watson as Baby. On account of this appearance, Watson is considered the last surviving actor from the Silent film era as of 2026.

== Music ==
The theme songs in the film were written by George W. Meyer and Al Bryan. The main theme song is entitled "My Song of the Nile" and is sung in the film a few times, most notably by Richard Barthelmess. This song is played frequently as background music by the Vitaphone orchestra throughout the film. The secondary theme song is entitled "I'm Too Young to Be Careful."

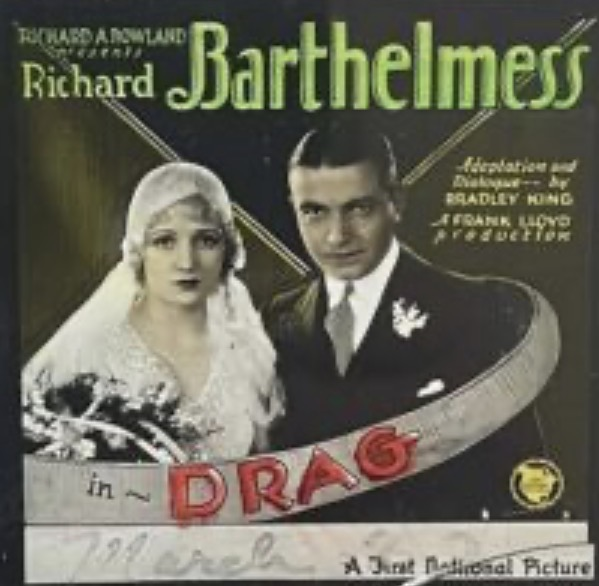

== Awards and honors ==
Frank Lloyd was nominated at the 2nd Academy Awards for Academy Award for Best Director along with the film Weary River.

== Preservation status ==
The film was long thought to be a lost film, but later was rediscovered. The film originally had two versions, a sound version and a silent version.

== See also ==
- List of rediscovered films
- List of early sound feature films (1926–1929)
- List of early Warner Bros. talking features
