= Hoop-La =

1933 film

- Theatrical release poster
- Directed by: Frank Lloyd
- Screenplay by: Bradley King; J.M. March
- Based on: The Barker by Kenyon Nicholson
- Starring: Clara Bow; Preston Foster; Richard Cromwell; Minna Gombell
- Cinematography: Ernest Palmer
- Music by: Louis De Francesco (uncredited)
- Distributed by: Fox Film Corporation
- Release date: November 30, 1933
- Running time: 85 minutes
- Country: United States
- Language: English

Hoop-La is a 1933 American pre-Code drama film directed by Frank Lloyd, and starring Clara Bow (in her final film role); Preston Foster, Richard Cromwell and Minna Gombell are also in the cast. The film is based on the play The Barker by Kenyon Nicholson, which was also filmed in 1928 under the same title as the play.

A version restored by the Museum of Modern Art was shown at the 2011 Classic Film Festival in Hollywood during the spring.

== Plot ==
When the sheltered and educated Chris Miller who is the son of Nifty Miller, manager of a travelling circus, shows up unexpectedly to visit his dad, Nifty wants him to turn around and go back to school. Nifty is reluctant to let him be around the circus folk. However, he is allowed to stay and work for a while; however, this means some things have to change—like Nifty and his paramour Carrie have to cool it for a while. Carrie does not take that well, and in anger pays worldly Hoochie coochie dancer Lou to seduce Chris and lure him away from his dad. Lou tries her best, and sometimes shocks the naïve Chris, like when she goes skinny dipping in a pond.

However, instead of taking him for a chump, she ends up falling in love and comes clean with him; he proposes marriage. Lou thinks she is not good enough for Chris, and so does Nifty. Then Chris and Lou sneak off and get married. Needing money to leave the circus, Lou hits up Carrie for the rest of the money she promised, threatening to tell Nifty if she does not pay. They gather enough money to leave, but not before an angry Nifty can throw them out and tell them never to come back. Lou and Chris head for the Chicago and the World's Fair where Lou dances and Chris works in a law office. Having fallen on hard times, Lou secretly arranges for Nifty to be the barker for her dancing act. Lou knows Chris will not be happy until he makes up with his father. Nifty is not happy; Chris explains that Lou has been making it possible for him to learn the law while she supports them with her dancing. In the end, Nifty realizes Lou is okay and forgives them both.

== Cast ==
- Clara Bow as Lou
- Preston Foster as Nifty Miller
- Richard Cromwell as Chris Miller
- Herbert Mundin as Hap Spissel
- James Gleason as Jerry
- Minna Gombell as Carrie
- Roger Imhof as Colonel Gowdy
- Florence Roberts as Ma Benson

unbilled

- Erville Alderson as The Sheriff
- Otis Harlan as Town Councilman, Side Show Customer
- Frank Mills as Barker
- Frank Moran as Side Show Craps Player
- Charles Sellon as The Colonel, Billy's Father

== Reception ==
The film was a box office disappointment for Fox.

== Remake ==
The same story was remade in 1945 as Billy Rose's Diamond Horseshoe starring Betty Grable.
