= The Rainbow Trail (1918 film) =

1918 American silent Western film

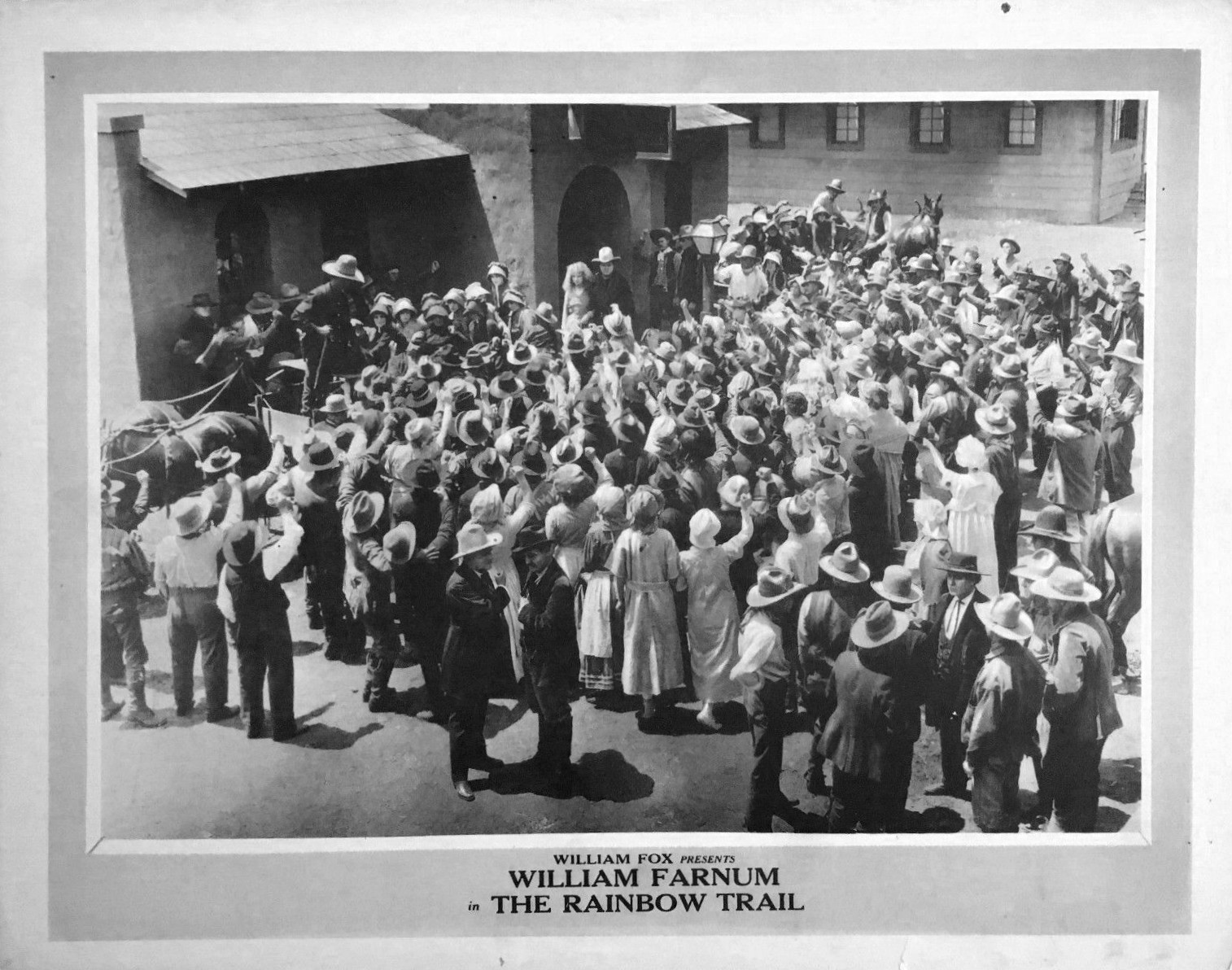
- Lobby card
- Directed by: Frank Lloyd
- Written by: Charles Kenyon; Frank Lloyd
- Based on: The Rainbow Trail by Zane Grey
- Produced by: William Fox
- Starring: William Farnum; Ann Forrest
- Cinematography: William C. Foster (as Billy Foster)
- Distributed by: Fox Film Corporation
- Release date: 27 October 1918
- Running time: 1 hour; (6 reels)
- Country: United States
- Languages: Silent; English intertitles

The Rainbow Trail is a lost 1918 American silent Western film directed by Frank Lloyd.

The picture was an adaptation of Zane Grey's 1915 novel of the same name. It was a sequel to the 1918 film Riders of the Purple Sage, which also starred William Farnum as Lassiter. The Rainbow Trail was remade in 1925 and, with sound, in 1932.

== Cast ==
- William Farnum as Lassiter
- Ann Forrest as Fay Larkin
- Mary Mersch as Jane Withersteen
- William Burress as Waggoner
- William Nigh as Shad (credited as William Nye)
- Genevieve Blinn as Ruth
- George Ross as U.S. Marshall
- Buck Jones as Cowboy (credited as Buck Gebhart)

== See also ==
- 1937 Fox vault fire
