= The Price of Silence (1917 film) =

1917 film by Frank Lloyd

- Directed by: Frank Lloyd
- Written by: William Pigott; Frank Lloyd
- Produced by: William Fox
- Starring: William Farnum; Frank Clark; Vivian Rich
- Cinematography: William C. Foster
- Production company: Fox Film
- Distributed by: Fox Film
- Release date: January 8, 1917
- Country: United States
- Languages: Silent; English intertitles

The Price of Silence is a 1917 American silent drama film directed by Frank Lloyd and starring William Farnum, Frank Clark and Vivian Rich.

== Cast ==
- William Farnum as Senator Frank Deering
- Frank Clark as Judge Vernon
- Vivian Rich as Grace Vernon - the Judge's Daughter
- Brooklyn Keller as Dr. Kendle
- Charles Clary as Henry McCarthy
- Ray Hanford as Joe Dugan
- Gordon Griffith as Jimmie, Dugan's Son

== See also ==
- 1937 Fox vault fire

== Bibliography ==
- Solomon, Aubrey. The Fox Film Corporation, 1915-1935: A History and Filmography. McFarland, 2011.
