= The Silver Horde =

The Silver Horde may refer to:

- The Silver Horde, 1909 American novel by Rex Beach#Biography set in Alaska
  - The Silver Horde (1920 film), American adaptation, directed by Frank Lloyd
  - The Silver Horde (1930 film), American adaptation, directed by George Archainbaud
  - The Silver Horde (Discworld characters), group of old barbarians in Terry Pratchett's Discworld fantasy series
