= Sins of Her Parent =

1916 film by Frank Lloyd

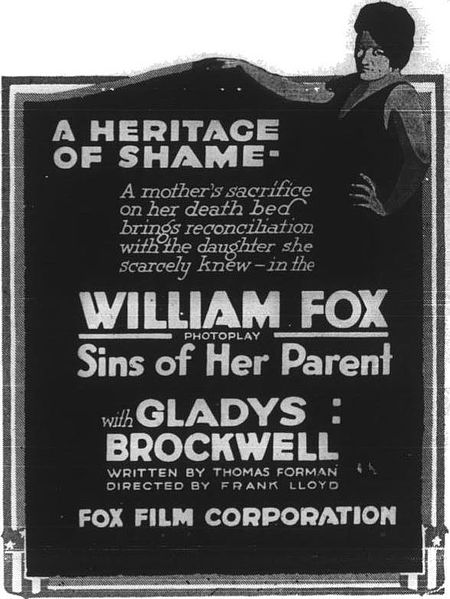
- Directed by: Frank Lloyd
- Written by: Tom Forman (story); Frank Lloyd
- Produced by: William Fox
- Starring: Gladys Brockwell; William Clifford; Carl von Schiller
- Cinematography: William C. Foster
- Production company: Fox Film
- Distributed by: Fox Film
- Release date: November 6, 1916
- Country: United States
- Languages: Silent; English intertitles

Sins of Her Parent is a 1916 American silent drama film directed by Frank Lloyd and starring Gladys Brockwell, William Clifford and Carl von Schiller.

== Cast ==
- Gladys Brockwell as Adrian Gardiner / Valerie Marchmont
- William Clifford as Robert Carver
- Carl von Schiller as Richard Carver
- George Webb as Arthur Heatherway
- Herschel Mayall as Jim McNeil
- Jim Farley as Shorty

== Bibliography ==
- Solomon, Aubrey. The Fox Film Corporation, 1915-1935: A History and Filmography. McFarland, 2011.
