= The Kingdom of Love =

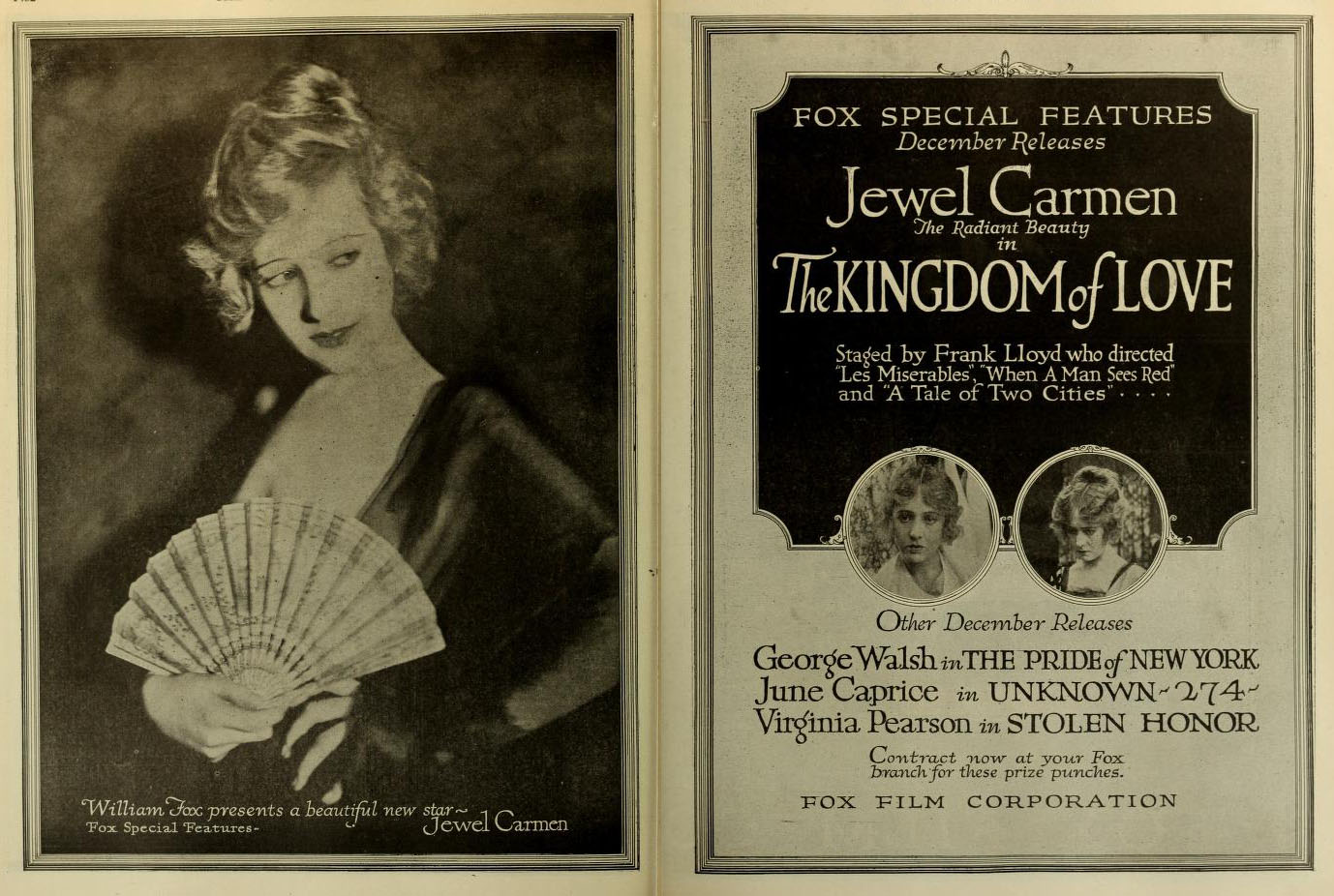
- Directed by: Frank Lloyd
- Written by: Doty Hobart (story); Frank Lloyd
- Produced by: William Fox
- Starring: Jewel Carmen; Nancy Caswell; Genevieve Blinn
- Production company: Fox Film
- Distributed by: Fox Film
- Release date: 1917
- Country: United States
- Languages: Silent; English intertitles

The Kingdom of Love is a 1917 American silent drama film directed by Frank Lloyd and starring Jewel Carmen, Nancy Caswell and Genevieve Blinn.

== Cast ==
- Jewel Carmen as Violet Carson
- Nancy Caswell as Violet Carson as a Child
- Genevieve Blinn as Mrs. Agnes Carson
- Lee Shumway as Rev. David Cromwell
- Fred Milton as Frank Carson
- Joseph Manning as Henry Carson
- G. Raymond Nye as Caribou Bill
- Murdock MacQuarrie as Buck, Dance Hall Owner

== Bibliography ==
- Solomon, Aubrey. The Fox Film Corporation, 1915-1935: A History and Filmography. McFarland, 2011.
