= Dark Streets (1929 film) =

1929 film by Frank Lloyd

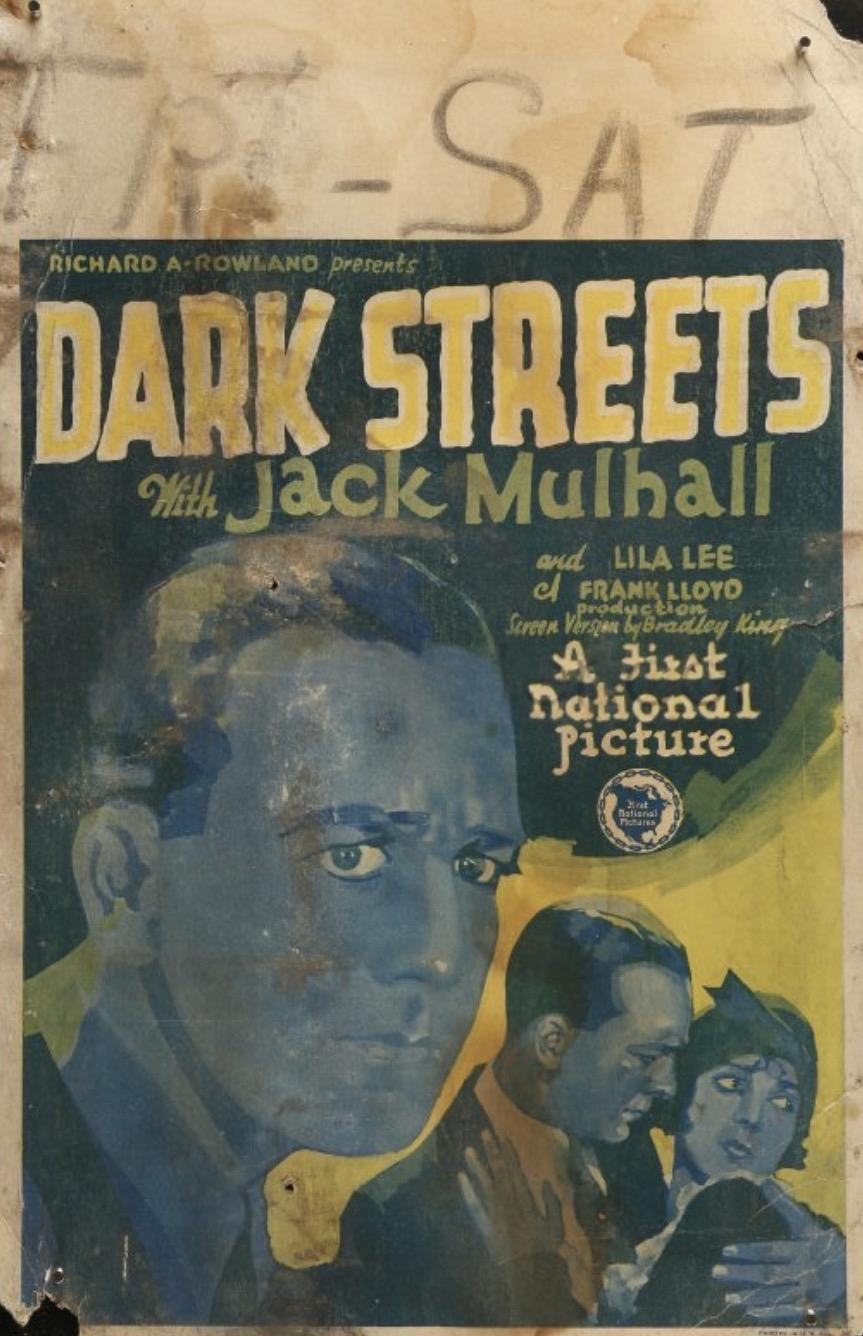
- Window Card
- Directed by: Frank Lloyd
- Written by: Bradley King (scenario & dialogue)
- Story by: Richard Connell
- Starring: Jack Mulhall; Lila Lee
- Cinematography: Ernest Haller
- Edited by: Edward Schroeder
- Production company: First National Pictures
- Distributed by: Warner Bros. Pictures, Inc.
- Release date: August 11, 1929 (limited release)
- Running time: 55 minutes
- Country: United States
- Language: English

Dark Streets is a 1929 American sound (All-Talking) pre-Code crime film directed by Frank Lloyd and starring Jack Mulhall and Lila Lee. The film was produced and distributed by First National Pictures. Mulhall purportedly plays the first dual role attempted in talking pictures.

== Plot ==
Pat and Danny McGlone are twin brothers raised by Mrs. Dean, a longtime family friend. Though inseparable in childhood, the brothers have grown into very different men. Pat, steady and honest, follows in their late father's footsteps and becomes a policeman. Danny, reckless and ambitious, falls in with a gang of criminals. Despite their opposing paths, both are in love with Mrs. Dean's daughter, Katie. While Katie is torn between the two, Danny's flashy lifestyle—complete with a car and easy money—gives him the upper hand.

One evening, as Pat patrols his beat, a silk warehouse robbery is underway nearby. Unbeknownst to Katie, Danny has orchestrated the heist. He pretends his car has broken down outside a disreputable garage and leaves her waiting while he helps the gang hijack a truckload of silk. As the truck speeds off, it's spotted by Officer Cuneo, who alerts nearby patrolmen. Pat rushes to respond, and during the pursuit, fires on the truck and kills the driver. In the chaos, he catches a fleeting glimpse of his brother, Danny, aboard the fleeing vehicle.

Later, the gang retaliates against Officer Cuneo, ambushing and beating him to death. A chilling warning is left on his body: any officer who interferes with the gang will suffer the same fate. Pat, now deeply suspicious and alarmed, pleads with Danny to leave the gang before it's too late. But Danny, unrepentant, offers Pat a place in the gang instead. Pat refuses.

Realizing Pat is a threat, the gang plots to eliminate him. Danny pleads to be left out of the planned hit. Katie, sensing Pat is in danger and finally admitting her love for him, races through the night to warn him. Pat, on duty, is suddenly confronted by Danny, who holds him at gunpoint and forces him into an abandoned building. There, Danny knocks Pat unconscious—an act both of protection and sacrifice.

The gangsters, hearing someone inside, assume it's Pat and open fire with a machine gun, cutting down the figure in uniform. But as he falls, the man returns fire, killing two gang members. When police arrive at the scene moments later, they discover the body of a uniformed officer lying in the street—Danny, dressed in his brother's patrol coat, fatally wounded.

Then, from the shadows, a battered figure stumbles forward—it is Pat, dazed and bloodied, but alive. Danny had "taken the rap" for his brother, sacrificing his life to save him. As Katie runs to Pat's side in tears, the tragic cost of loyalty and redemption becomes clear.

== Cast ==
- Jack Mulhall as Pat McGlone / Danny McGlone
- Lila Lee as Katie Dean
- Aggie Herring as Mrs. Dean
- Earl Pingree as Cuneo
- Will Walling as Police Captain
- E. H. Calvert as Police Lieutenant
- Maurice Black as "Beefy" Barker
- Lucien Littlefield as Census Taker
- Pat Harmon as Hoodlum

== Preservation ==
With no prints of Dark Streets in any archives, it is a lost film.

== See also ==
- List of early sound feature films (1926–1929)
