= A Passport to Hell =

1932 film

- Theatrical release poster
- Directed by: Frank Lloyd
- Screenplay by: Leon Gordon; Bradley King
- Story by: Harry Hervey
- Starring: Elissa Landi; Paul Lukas; Warner Oland; Alexander Kirkland; Donald Crisp; Earle Foxe
- Cinematography: John F. Seitz
- Edited by: Harold D. Schuster
- Production company: Fox Film Corporation
- Distributed by: Fox Film Corporation
- Release date: August 14, 1932
- Running time: 75 minutes
- Country: United States
- Language: English

A Passport to Hell is a 1932 American pre-Code drama film directed by Frank Lloyd and written by Leon Gordon and Bradley King. The film stars Elissa Landi, Paul Lukas, Warner Oland, Alexander Kirkland, Donald Crisp and Earle Foxe. The film was released on August 14, 1932, by Fox Film Corporation.

== Plot ==
A notorious beautiful English woman is kicked out of British West Africa to German West Africa, just before the start of World War I. She marries a German colonial official to avoid internment. When Erich's father discovers her past he deports her. Before leaving, an English spy approaches her for help to escape with a vital military map. She must decide her allegiance.

== Cast ==
- Elissa Landi as Myra Carson
- Paul Lukas as Lt. Kurt Kurtoff
- Warner Oland as Baron von Sydow
- Alexander Kirkland as Lt. Erich von Sydow
- Donald Crisp as Sgt. Snyder
- Earle Foxe as Purser
- Yola d'Avril as Rosita
- Ivan Simpson as Simms
- Eva Dennison as Mrs. Butterworth
- Wilhelm von Brincken as Officer
- Anders Van Haden as Immigration Officer
- Bert Sprotte as Hotel Proprietor
- John Lester Johnson as Zakka
- Vera Morrison as Sheba
