= The Wise Guy =

1926 film by Frank Lloyd

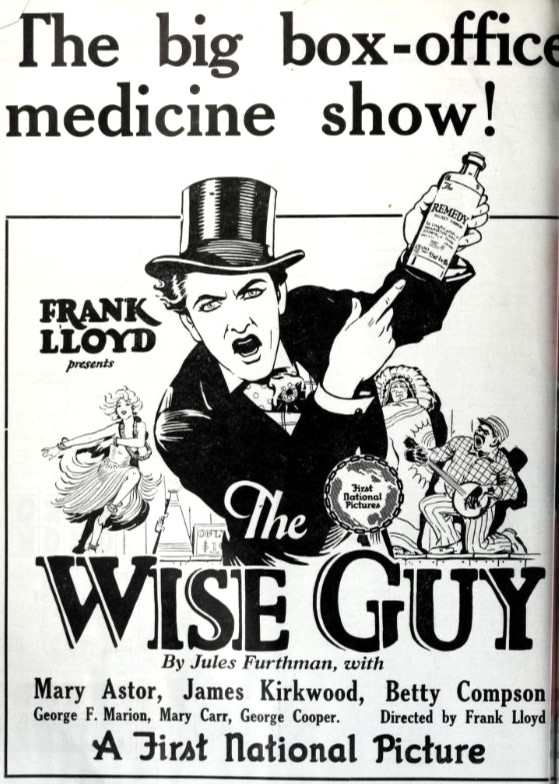
- Advertisement
- Directed by: Frank Lloyd
- Written by: Adela Rogers St. Johns (adaptation); Ada McQuillan (scenario); George Marion, Jr. (intertitles)
- Story by: Jules Furthman
- Produced by: Frank Lloyd
- Starring: Mary Astor; James Kirkwood; Betty Compson
- Cinematography: Norbert Brodine
- Distributed by: First National Pictures
- Release date: May 23, 1926
- Running time: 8 reels (7,775 feet)
- Country: United States
- Language: Silent (English intertitles)

The Wise Guy is a 1926 American silent crime drama film produced and directed by Frank Lloyd and distributed through First National Pictures. Jules Furthman provided a screen story with scenario by Adela Rogers St. Johns. Mary Astor, James Kirkwood, and Betty Compson star.

== Cast ==
- James Kirkwood as Guy Watson
- Mary Astor as Mary
- Betty Compson as Hula Kate
- George F. Marion as Horace Palmer
- Mary Carr as Ma Palmer
- George Cooper as The Bozo

== Reception ==
Because the Kirkwood character was a criminal posing as an evangelistic minister who performs marriage and burial ceremonies, the film was found by the New York Board of Censors to be sacrilegious and banned from distribution unless remade. The Board was also concerned by the number of times the name of the Deity appeared in subtitles spoken by the fake minister. First National estimated the cost of resolving the Board's issues to be an additional $50,000 above the initial cost of $175,000.

== Preservation ==
A complete 35mm nitrate print of The Wise Guy is held by the National Archives of Canada.
