= Young Nowheres =

1929 film by Frank Lloyd

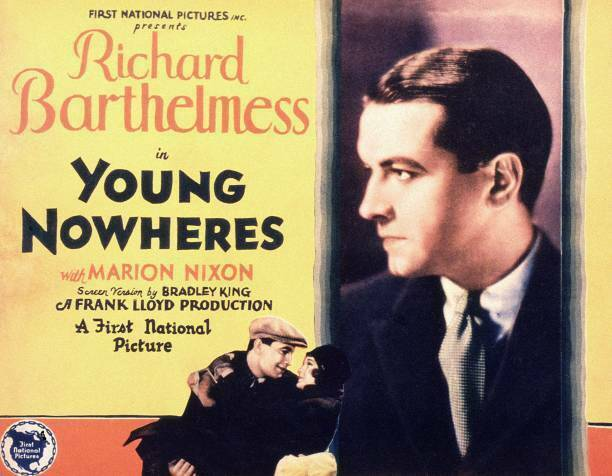
- Directed by: Frank Lloyd
- Written by: Bradley King; I.A.R. Wylie
- Based on: short story Young Nowheres by Ida Alexa Ross Wylie in The Saturday Evening Post, c.1927
- Starring: Richard Barthelmess; Marian Nixon; Bert Roach
- Cinematography: Ernest Haller
- Edited by: Ray Curtiss
- Production company: First National Pictures
- Distributed by: First National Pictures
- Release date: October 20, 1929
- Running time: 65 minutes
- Country: United States
- Language: English

Young Nowheres is a 1929 American sound (All-Talking) drama film directed by Frank Lloyd and starring Richard Barthelmess, Marian Nixon and Bert Roach. It was produced and released by First National Pictures with a Vitaphone soundtrack in both silent and sound versions.

== Plot ==
Albert “Binky” Whalen is a kind-hearted, daydreaming elevator boy in a New York apartment building. Poor and idealistic, he supplements his meager income by shining shoes and cleaning residents’ apartments. He sleeps in a dingy basement, but holds on tightly to his dreams of something better.

One day, while cleaning the upscale apartment of wealthy tenant Mr. Cleaver, who has gone away to California for the holidays, Binky is visited by Annie Jackson, a gentle and equally destitute orphan who is also his sweetheart. Together they marvel at the comforts of Cleaver’s apartment and imagine a life where they might one day have something so fine of their own. They escape to Coney Island for a day, and after falling asleep on the beach, wake up soaked by the tide. Binky gives Annie his worn-out coat to keep her warm, but the exposure leads to her developing pneumonia. She is hospitalized, and Binky visits her daily, using up every spare cent to comfort her. Out of the fifteen dollars he’s saved over six months, he buys her a soft white coat with a cheap fur collar.

Remembering that Cleaver will not be back until after Christmas, Binky decides to create a moment of peace and dignity for Annie upon her release. He prepares Cleaver’s empty apartment for her—with firewood, food, a pair of warm slippers, and a modest kimono. Annie is moved to tears when she’s brought to the cozy apartment. She basks in the warmth of the fireplace and the small luxuries Binky has managed to give her.

Just as they begin to enjoy this brief glimpse of happiness, a key turns in the door—Cleaver has returned early. Shocked by the scene, he suspects impropriety and has both Binky and Annie arrested for using his apartment for immoral purposes. In court, Binky tells the full story. The judge, moved by their honesty and circumstances, declares that the real offense is the world’s indifference to young people like them who only want a chance at dignity and happiness. Cleaver, shamed by his own lack of compassion, drops the charges. Mr. Jesse, a kind resident of the building who has always looked out for Binky, steps forward and offers to take responsibility for both Binky and Annie, promising to help them find a better path forward. The case is dismissed, and for the first time, the young couple is offered real hope for the future.

== Cast ==
- Richard Barthelmess as Albert 'Binky' Whalen
- Marian Nixon as Annie Jackson
- Bert Roach as Mr. Jesse
- Anders Randolf as Cleaver
- Ray Turner as George
- Jocelyn Lee as Brunette
- Scott Seaton as Judge

== Background ==
Ida Alexa Ross Wylie's short story of the same name was published in The Saturday Evening Post in 1927. Director Louis King read the story and bought the rights in order to adapt it for the screen. He approached Richard Barthelmess, who had played a similar role in Tol'able David (1921), for the lead role, but First National Pictures refused to lend Barthelmess for the project. Barthelmess acquired the story rights from King in early 1929 and persuaded First National to produce the film.

The story was again adapted in 1937's That Man's Here Again, directed by King.

== Preservation ==
The preservation status of Young Nowheres is listed as unknown, suggesting that it may be a lost film.

== See also ==
- List of early sound feature films (1926–1929)

== Bibliography ==
- Hans J. Wollstein. Strangers in Hollywood: the History of Scandinavian Actors in American Films from 1910 to World War II. Scarecrow Press, 1994. ISBN 0-8108-2938-X
