= The Stronger Love =

1916 film by Frank Lloyd

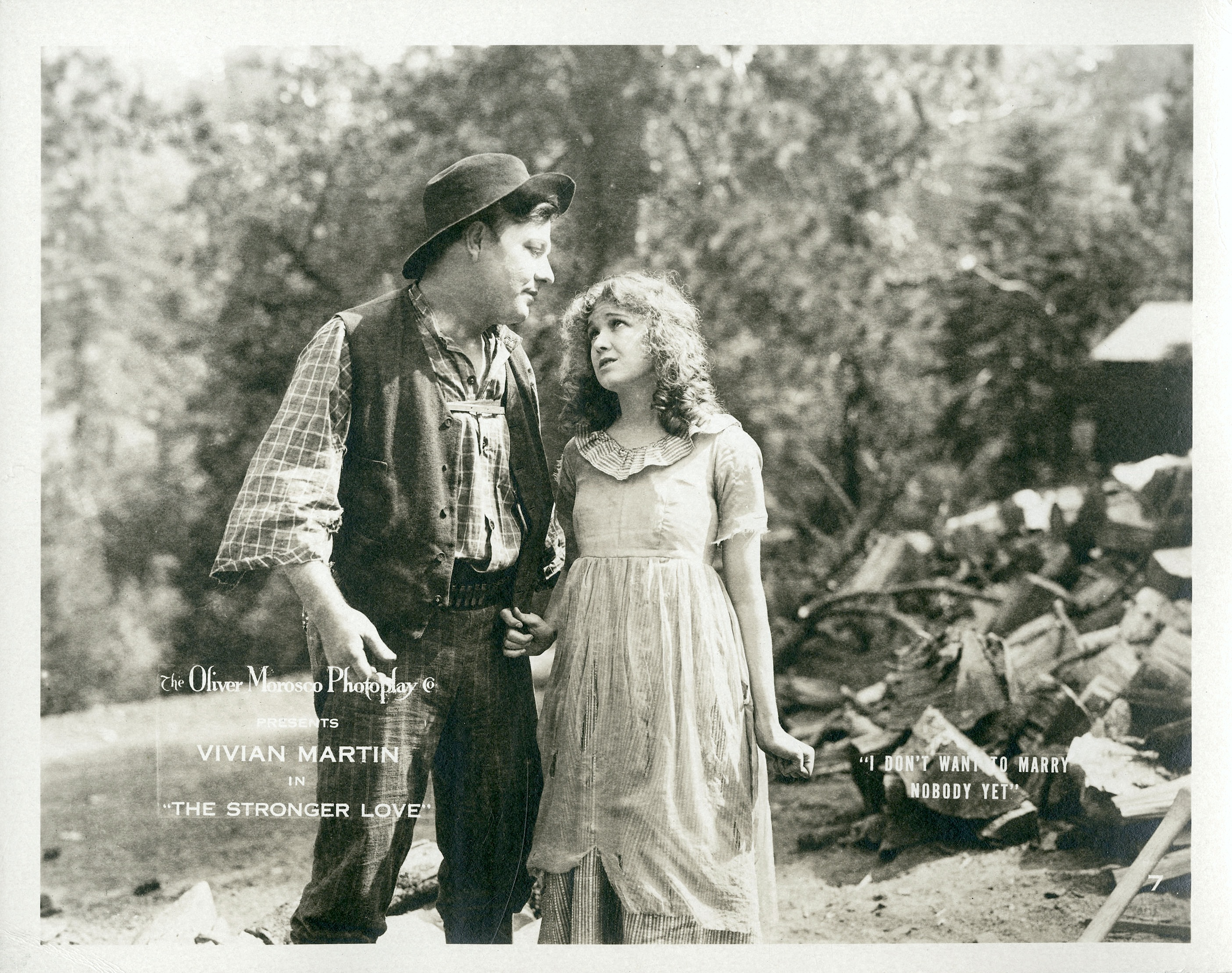
- Still with caption, "I don't want to marry nobody yet."
- Directed by: Frank Lloyd
- Screenplay by: Julia Crawford Ivers
- Story by: Alice von Saxmar
- Starring: Vivian Martin; Edward Peil, Sr. Frank Lloyd; Jack Livingston; Alice Knowland; Herbert Standing
- Cinematography: James Van Trees
- Production company: Oliver Morosco Photoplay Company
- Distributed by: Paramount Pictures
- Release date: August 13, 1916
- Running time: 50 minutes
- Country: United States
- Language: Silent (English intertitles)

The Stronger Love is a 1916 American drama silent film directed by Frank Lloyd, written by Julia Crawford Ivers, and starring Vivian Martin, Edward Peil, Sr., Frank Lloyd, Jack Livingston, Alice Knowland, and Herbert Standing. It was released on August 13, 1916, by Paramount Pictures.

== Plot ==
Nell Serviss, a beautiful young girl from the mountains that was engaged to Jim Serviss, who is the leader of their clan. She meets a stranger at the Rutherford farm and falls in love. The stranger is in their mountains searching for radium in rocks. Someone lights the Serviss farm on fire and the stranger is falsely accused. Everyone is mad at the stranger (who at this point is revealed to be a Rutherford) but Nell says she wants to marry him so that no one will kill him. In the end, Nell chases after Jim to tell him that she lied and really wants to be with him.

== Cast ==
- Vivian Martin as Nell Serviss
- Edward Peil, Sr. as Jim Serviss
- Frank Lloyd as Tom Serviss
- Jack Livingston as Rolf Rutherford
- Alice Knowland as Mrs. Jane Rutherford
- Herbert Standing as Oriel Kincaid
- John McKinnon as Peter Kincaid
- Louise Emmons as Widow Serviss
- William Jefferson

== Preservation status ==
The Stronger Love survives in an incomplete or in fragment form in the Library of Congress, Packard Campus for Audio-Visual Conservation.
