= The Invisible Power =

1921 film

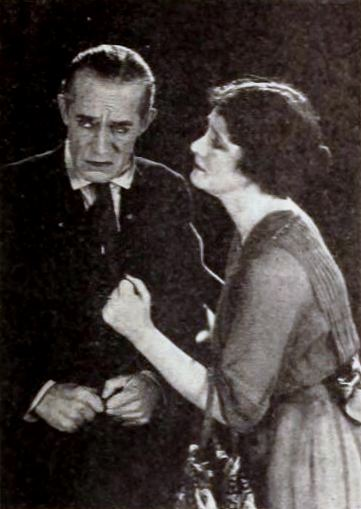
- Film still
- Directed by: Frank Lloyd
- Written by: Charles Kenyon
- Produced by: Frank Lloyd
- Starring: House Peters; Irene Rich; DeWitt Jennings
- Cinematography: Norbert Brodine
- Distributed by: Goldwyn Pictures
- Release date: October 1921
- Running time: 7 reels
- Country: United States
- Language: Silent (English intertitles)

The Invisible Power is a 1921 American crime melodrama film directed by Frank Lloyd and released by Goldwyn Pictures.

== Plot ==
As described in a film magazine, Sid Chambers, a thief, is released from prison and rejoins his pals at a Greek restaurant. He finds his former second story man Bob Drake, without funds as he has developed a cough that discloses his whereabouts. The two crooks go to the country where Sid falls in love with a young woman, Laura Chadwick, who wants him to go straight. He becomes a travelling salesman and they live quietly in a small cottage until detective Mark Shadwell shows up. Shadwell has been pressured by his chief to make a showing in a big necklace robbery, so he arrests Sid and sends him back to prison. After Laura's child is born she is unable to provide for it and is compelled to give it up. The detective's wife adopts the child. When Laura is arrested for vagrancy, the detective, thinking to make the husband confess to the necklace robbery, brings the couple together at his house. After they see the baby, the detective relents and frees Sid and his wife and helps return them to their home.

== Cast ==
- House Peters as Sid Chambers
- Irene Rich as Laura Chadwick
- DeWitt Jennings as Mark Shadwell
- Sidney Ainsworth as Bob Drake
- Jessie De Jainette as Mrs. Shadwell
- William Friend as Mr. Miller
- Gertrude Claire as Mrs. Miller
- Lydia Yeamans Titus as The Giggling Neighbor
