= Under Crimson Skies =

1920 film by Rex Ingram

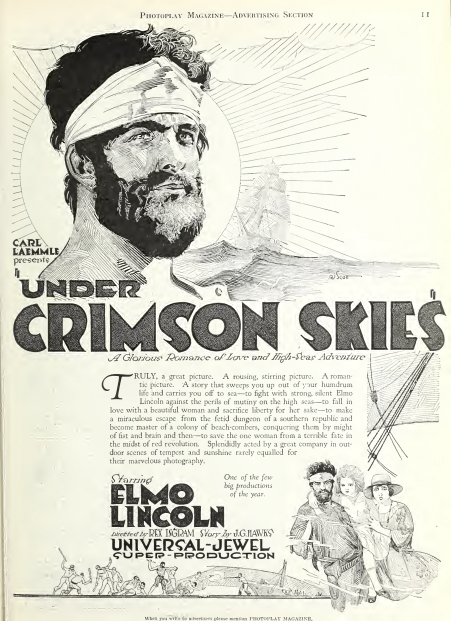
- Directed by: Rex Ingram
- Written by: J.G. Hawks; Harvey F. Thew
- Starring: Elmo Lincoln; Harry von Meter; Mabel Ballin
- Cinematography: Phil Rosen
- Production company: Universal Pictures
- Distributed by: Universal Pictures
- Release date: July 6, 1920
- Country: United States
- Languages: Silent; English intertitles

Under Crimson Skies is a 1920 American silent adventure film directed by Rex Ingram and starring Elmo Lincoln, Harry von Meter and Mabel Ballin. There are no known archival holdings of the film, so it is presumably a lost film.

== Cast ==
- Elmo Lincoln as Captain Yank Barstow
- Harry von Meter as Vance Clayton
- Mabel Ballin as Helen Clayton
- Nancy Caswell as Peg Clayton
- Frank Brownlee as Dead Sight Burke
- Paul Weigel as Plum Duff Hargis
- Dick La Reno as Second Mate
- Noble Johnson as Baltimore Bucko
- Beatrice Dominguez as Island Girl
- Ethel Irving

== Bibliography ==
- Leonhard Gmür. Rex Ingram: Hollywood's Rebel of the Silver Screen. 2013.
