= Maid of Salem =

1937 film by Frank Lloyd

- Theatrical poster
- Directed by: Frank Lloyd
- Written by: Walter Ferris; Durwad Grimstead; Bradley King
- Produced by: Howard Estabrook
- Starring: Claudette Colbert; Fred MacMurray; Harvey Stephens
- Cinematography: Leo Tover
- Edited by: Hugh Bennett
- Music by: Victor Young
- Production company: Paramount Pictures
- Distributed by: Paramount Pictures
- Release date: March 3, 1937
- Running time: 85 minutes
- Country: United States
- Language: English

Maid of Salem is a 1937 American historical drama film directed by Frank Lloyd and starring Claudette Colbert, Fred MacMurray and Harvey Stephens. It was made and distributed by Hollywood studio Paramount Pictures.

== Plot ==
A young girl in Salem, Massachusetts in 1692 has an affair with an adventurer. She is sentenced as a witch, but saved by him.

== Cast ==
- Claudette Colbert as Barbara Clarke
- Fred MacMurray as Roger Coverman
- Harvey Stephens as Dr. John Harding
- Gale Sondergaard as Martha Harding
- Louise Dresser as Ellen Clarke
- Benny Bartlett as Timothy Clarke
- Edward Ellis as Elder Goode
- Beulah Bondi as Abigail Goode
- Bonita Granville as Ann Goode
- Virginia Weidler as Nabby Goode
- Donald Meek as Ezra Cheeves
- E.E. Clive as Bilge
- Halliwell Hobbes as Jeremiah
- Pedro de Cordoba as Mr. Morse
- Madame Sul-Te-Wan as Tituba
- Lucy Beaumont as Rebecca, the Nurse
- Henry Kolker as the Crown Chief Justice Laughton
- William Farnum as the Crown Justice Sewall
- Ivan F. Simpson as Rev. Parris
- Brandon Hurst as the Tithing Man
- Sterling Holloway as Miles Corbin, the Cow Herder
- Zeffie Tilbury as Goody Hodgers
- Babs Nelson as Baby Mercy Cheeves
- Mary Treen as Susy Abbott
- J. Farrell MacDonald as the Captain of the Ship
- Stanley Fields as the First Mate
- Lionel Belmore as the Tavern Keeper
- Wally Albright as Jasper (uncredited)
- Harry Cording as Guard (uncredited)
- Russell Simpson as Village Marshal (uncredited)

== Reception ==
Writing for The Spectator in 1937, Graham Greene gave the film a mildly positive review, describing the dialogue as "pompously period", but praising the story as one allowing for "a little authentic horror [] to creep in".

== See also ==
- List of films about witchcraft
