= The Man from Lost River =

1921 film

- Directed by: Frank Lloyd
- Written by: Lambert Hillyer; Arthur F. Statter
- Story by: Katharine Newlin Burt
- Starring: House Peters; Fritzi Brunette; Allan Forrest
- Cinematography: Norbert Brodine
- Production company: Goldwyn Pictures
- Release date: November 1921
- Running time: 60 minutes
- Country: United States
- Language: Silent (English intertitles)

The Man from Lost River is a lost American silent drama film directed by Frank Lloyd and released in 1921. It stars House Peters, Fritzi Brunette, and Allan Forrest.

== Plot ==
As described in a film magazine, Jim Barnes (Peters) has been raised in the woods and knows little of how to associate with women. As foreman at a lumber camp, he comes to love Marcia Judd (Brunette), but his backwardness allows her to be won over by the smooth talking Arthur Fosdick (Forrest), a New York society man who had recently come to the camp. Realizing that the young woman is in love with the Easterner and the weakness of his character, Jim constitutes himself as Marcia's protector without her knowledge. After proving his utter worthlessness, Arthur's death is brought about by his own cowardice, Marcia awakens to the strength of a noble man's love.

== Cast ==
- House Peters as Jim Barnes
- Fritzi Brunette as Marcia Judd
- Allan Forrest as Arthur Fosdick
- James Gordon as Rossiter
- Monte Collins as Mr. Carson
- Milla Davenport as Mrs. Carson
