= The Code of Marcia Gray =

1916 film by Frank Lloyd

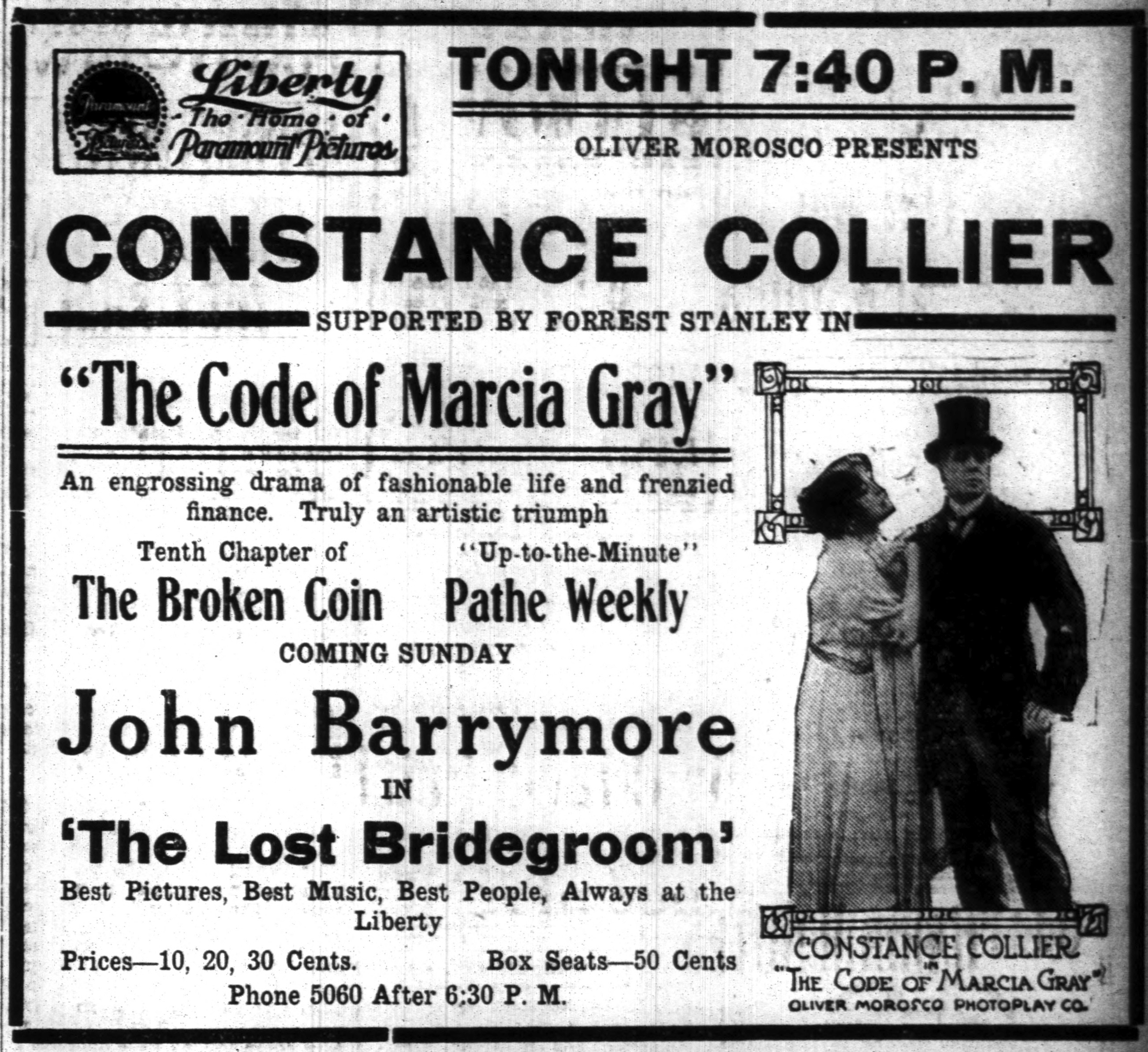
- Newspaper advertisement.
- Directed by: Frank Lloyd
- Written by: Elliot Clawson; Frank Lloyd
- Produced by: Oliver Morosco
- Starring: Constance Collier
- Cinematography: James Van Trees
- Distributed by: Paramount Pictures
- Release date: March 16, 1916
- Running time: 5 reels
- Country: United States
- Languages: Silent (English intertitles)

The Code of Marcia Gray is a 1916 silent romantic crime drama produced by Oliver Morosco, distributed through Paramount Pictures and directed by Frank Lloyd.

== Cast ==
- Constance Collier as Marcia Gray
- Harry De Vere as Harry Gray
- Forrest Stanley as lawyer, Orlando Castle
- Frank A. Bonn as James Romaine
- Howard Davies as Ed Crane
- Helen Jerome Eddy as Crane's Daughter
- Herbert Standing as Banker Agnew
- Page Peters as Castle's clerk

== Production background ==
The film is based on a true story concerning the collapse of the Knickerbocker Bank in New York. The film starred Constance Collier in her second film role. Collier made this film during her trip to the United States with Herbert Beerbohm Tree.

== Preservation status ==
The film survives in the Library of Congress.
