= The Sin Flood (1922 film) =

1922 film

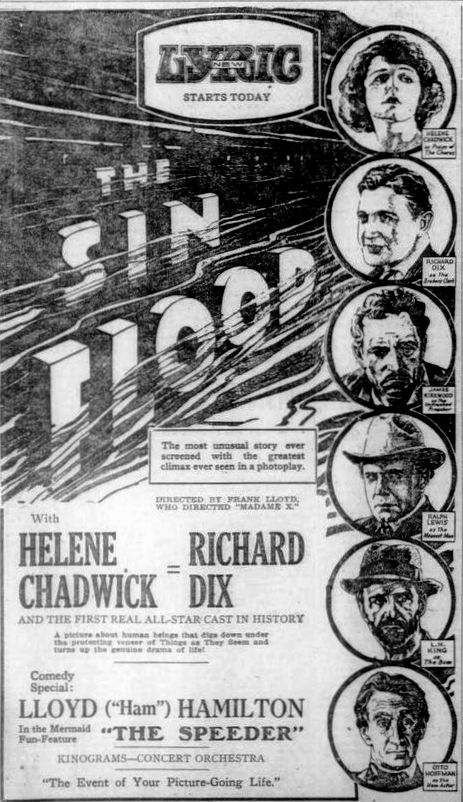
- contemporary advertisement (newspaper)
- Directed by: Frank Lloyd; Harry Weil (ass't director)
- Written by: J. G. Hawks
- Based on: The Sin Flood by Frank Allen and Henning Berger
- Produced by: Samuel Goldwyn
- Starring: Richard Dix; Helene Chadwick
- Cinematography: Norbert Brodine
- Distributed by: Goldwyn Pictures
- Release date: November 12, 1922
- Running time: 70 minutes
- Country: United States
- Language: Silent (English intertitles)

The Sin Flood is a lost 1922 American silent drama film directed by Frank Lloyd and starring Richard Dix and Helene Chadwick. It was distributed by Goldwyn Pictures.

The story was remade by First National and Warner Brothers in 1930 as the early talkie The Way of All Men, now lost as well. Frank Lloyd again directed and William Orlamond returned as Nordling.

== Plot ==
As described in a film magazine, Bill Bear, a cotton broker's clerk in the Mississippi river town of Cottonia, is in love with a chorus girl named Poppy. He learns that his crabbed employer Fraser is attempting to corner the market and uses this knowledge to enter into a partnership with Fraser's enemy Swift. They grow rich and Bill becomes engaged to Swift's daughter. On the day of the wedding, however, Bill, Poppy, Fraser, Swift, a street preacher with a taste for alcohol, a plain drunk, stranded Swedish engineer Nordling, an out-at-elbows actor, corporate lawyer Sharpe, saloon keeper Stratton, and a bartender are imprisoned in Stratton's cafe by a sudden flood. The Stratton had water-tight doors and shutters installed on his cafe due to a previous flood, and these are shut. The electric lights, telephone, and market price ticker are soon cut off. Nordling figures that they have twenty hours before the oxygen in the air will become exhausted and cause their lingering death. With candles lit and the air becoming more difficult to breathe, street preacher O'Neill tells them that the last day has come and exhorts them to repentance. They join hands in a circle. Fraser forgives Fill and Swift for their efforts to ruin him financially. O'Neill discovers in attorney Sharpe the man who stole his wife and drove the preacher from his pulpit to the street, and in the presence of death he forgives him. Sharpe admits that he bribed the contractor building the levee that has burst and flooded the city to use faulty material. Bill finds his love for Poppy returning and they agree to meet death in each other's arms. The bartender admits to taking money from the till while his employer admits to underpaying him. Stratton brings out his choicest wine and invites all to partake. With the candle flame becoming feeble and the prisoners having more difficulty in breathing, they decide to bring death more quickly by opening the doors and letting in the water. When the doors are forced open, sunlight bursts into the room. It is found that the freak flood has diminished and Cottonia is resuming its normal business life. The market ticker starts up, and Fraser sees that Swift and Bill are still hammering him on the cotton exchange, causing his bitter enmity to return. Stratton demands that his guests pay him for the wine he provided and tells the bartender that he will dock his pay until the money taken from the till is paid. The bartender throws out the drunk, the Swedish engineer, and broken down actor, and preacher O'Neill again surrenders to his appetite for alcohol. Bill has ignored Poppy as he watches the market ticker, but, when he sees her accosted on the street by a man inviting her to have a drink, he rushes forward to grab her to take her to the license bureau. The experience with the flood has taught him to value Poppy's love and to see the mistake he was about to make in marrying his partner's daughter.

== Cast ==
- Richard Dix as Bill Bear
- Helene Chadwick as Poppy
- James Kirkwood Sr. as O'Neill
- John Steppling as Swift
- Ralph Lewis as Fraser
- Howard Davies as Sharpe
- Will Walling as Stratton
- William Orlamond as Nordling
- Darwin Karr as Charlie
- Otto Hoffman as Higgins
- Louis King as A Drunk
