= The Eagle of the Sea =

1926 film

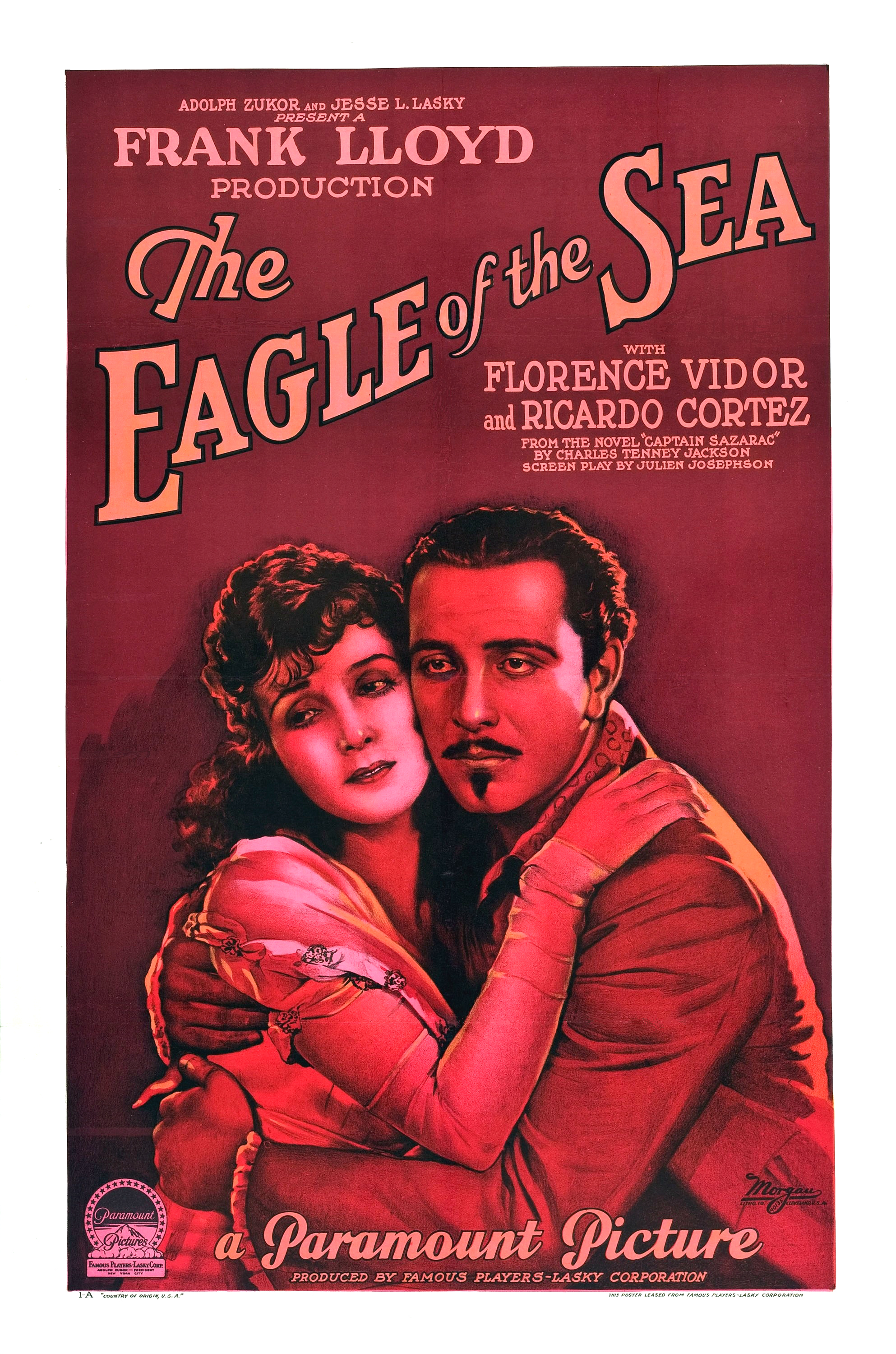
- Film poster
- Directed by: Frank Lloyd
- Written by: Charles Tenney Jackson; Julien Josephson
- Produced by: B. P. Schulberg
- Starring: Florence Vidor; Ricardo Cortez
- Cinematography: Norbert Brodine
- Distributed by: Paramount Pictures
- Release date: October 18, 1926
- Running time: 80 minutes (8 reels)
- Country: United States
- Language: Silent with English intertitles

The Eagle of the Sea is a 1926 American silent drama film directed by Frank Lloyd, starring Florence Vidor and Ricardo Cortez, and featuring Boris Karloff in an uncredited pirate role. Complete prints of the film exist.

== Cast ==
- Florence Vidor as Louise Lestron
- Ricardo Cortez as Captain Sazarac
- Sam De Grasse as Colonel Lestron
- George Beranger as John Jarvis (as André de Beranger)
- Mitchell Lewis as Crackley
- Guy Oliver as Beluche
- George Irving as General Andrew Jackson
- James A. Marcus as Dominique (as James Marcus)
- Ervin Renard as Don Robledo
- C. E. Anderson as Bohon (as Charles Anderson)
- Boris Karloff as Pirate (uncredited)
- Bob Kortman as Pirate (uncredited)

== See also ==
- List of American films of 1926
- Boris Karloff filmography
