= The Great Lover (1920 film) =

1920 film by Frank Lloyd

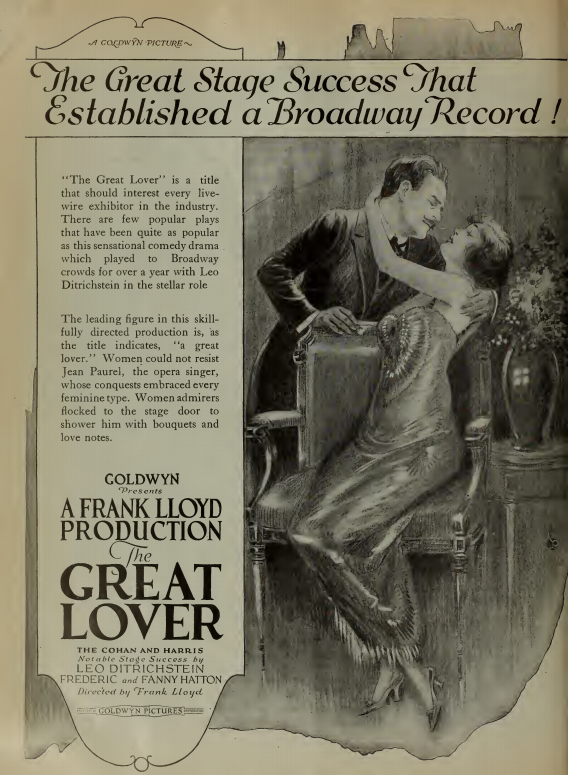
- Directed by: Frank Lloyd
- Screenplay by: J.E. Nash
- Based on: The Great Lover; 1915 play by Leo Ditrichstein; Fanny Hatton; Frederic Hatton
- Produced by: Samuel Goldwyn
- Starring: John St. Polis; Richard Tucker; Claire Adams
- Color process: Silent
- Production company: Goldwyn Pictures
- Distributed by: Goldwyn Distributing
- Release date: November 1920
- Running time: 6 reels
- Country: United States
- Language: English intertitles

The Great Lover is a 1920 American silent drama film directed by Frank Lloyd and starring John St. Polis, Richard Tucker and Claire Adams.

The film is based on the play, "The Great Lover," by Leo Ditrichstein, Frederic Hatton and Fanny Hatton, which premiered on Broadway on November 10, 1915.

== Cast ==
- John St. Polis as Jean Paurel
- Richard Tucker as Ward
- Claire Adams as Ethel
- John Davidson as Sonino
- Alice Hollister as Bianca
- Lionel Belmore as Impresario
- Rose Dione as Sabotini
- Tom Ricketts as Potter
- Frederick Vroom as Doctor
- Gino Corrado as Secretary

== Bibliography ==
- Goble, Alan. The Complete Index to Literary Sources in Film. Walter de Gruyter, 1999.
