= The Eternal Flame (film) =

1922 film by Frank Lloyd

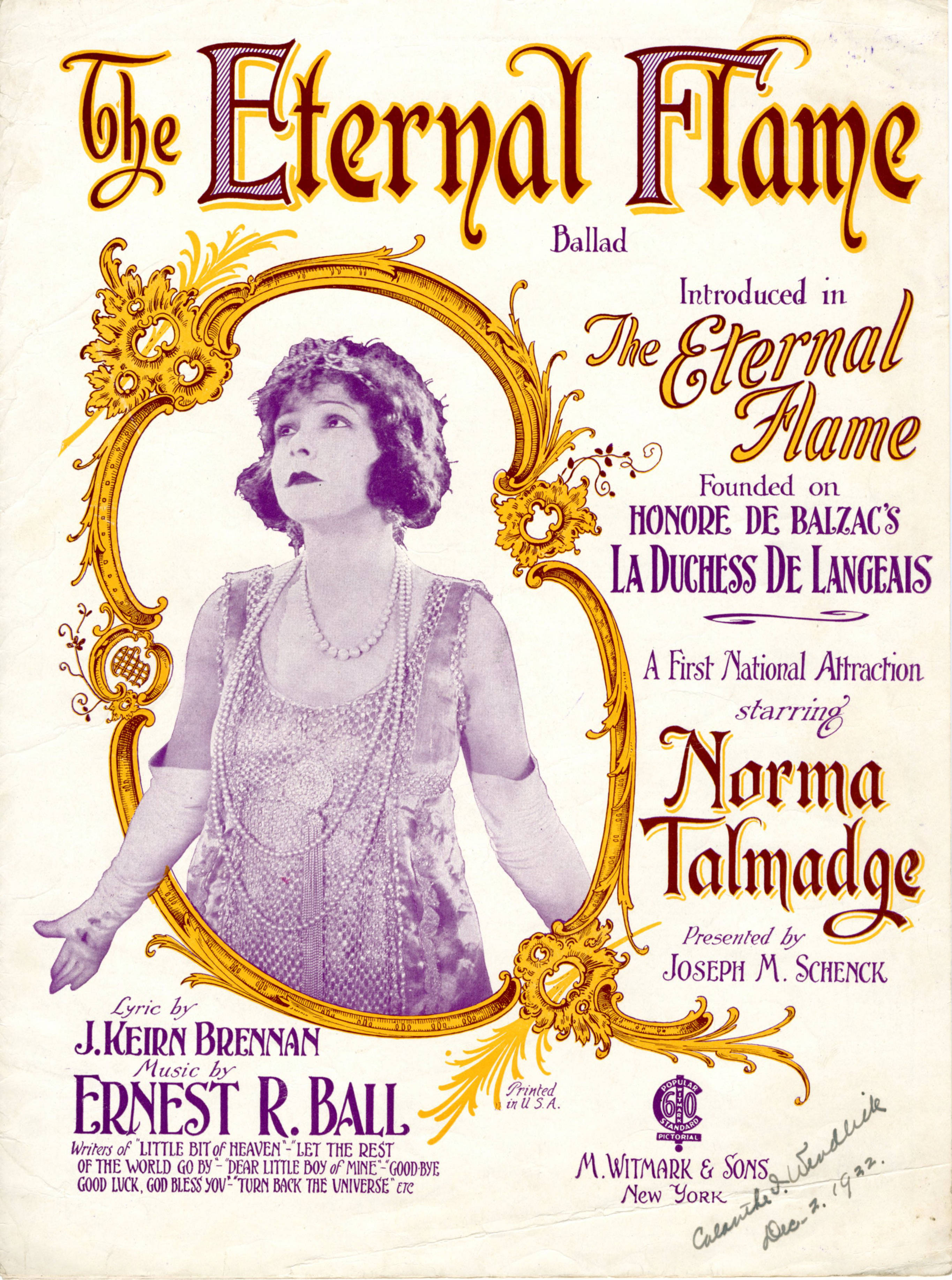
- Cover of sheet music
- Directed by: Frank Lloyd
- Written by: Frances Marion
- Based on: novella La Duchesse de Langeais by Honoré de Balzac
- Produced by: Joseph Schenck; Norma Talmadge
- Starring: Norma Talmadge
- Cinematography: Tony Gaudio
- Distributed by: Associated First National Pictures
- Release date: September 17, 1922
- Running time: 96 minutes
- Country: United States
- Language: Silent (English intertitles)

The Eternal Flame is a 1922 American silent adventure drama film directed by Frank Lloyd and starring Norma Talmadge, Adolphe Menjou, and Wedgwood Nowell.

== Cast ==
- Norma Talmadge as Duchesse de Langeais
- Adolphe Menjou as Duc de Langeais
- Wedgwood Nowell as Marquis de Ronquerolles
- Conway Tearle as General de Montriveau
- Rosemary Theby as Madame de Serizy
- Kate Lester as Princess de Vlamont-Chaurray
- Tom Ricketts as Vidame de Pameir
- Otis Harlan as Abbe Conrand
- Irving Cummings as Count de Marsay

== Preservation status ==
Six of eight reels of The Eternal Flame are preserved in the Rohauer collection of the Library of Congress. Reels 3 and 8 are missing.
