= Roads of Destiny (film) =

1921 film

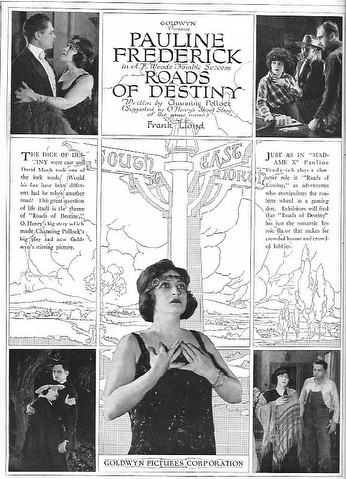
- 1921 lobby poster
- Directed by: Frank Lloyd
- Written by: J. E. Nash
- Based on: "Roads of Destiny" by O. Henry Roads of Destiny by Channing Pollock
- Produced by: Samuel Goldwyn
- Starring: Pauline Frederick
- Cinematography: J. Devereaux Jennings
- Distributed by: Goldwyn Pictures
- Release date: April 1921
- Country: United States
- Language: silent (English intertitles)

Roads of Destiny is a 1921 American silent drama film produced and distributed by Goldwyn Pictures. The film is based on the 1909 short story of the same name by O. Henry that was turned into a play by Channing Pollock starring Florence Reed. Frank Lloyd directed and stage actress Pauline Frederick starred. The film is now considered lost.

== Plot ==
As summarized in a film publication, David Marsh, an inventor, is in love with Ann Hardy, but his brother Lewis also loves her. Lewis previously loved Rose Merritt, but betrayed her and has cast her off. When he sees the success of David with Ann, Lewis reproaches his brother and threatens to end his own life unless he can marry Ann. David, overcome with these events, sinks into an armchair and falls asleep. In his dreams, the figure of Fate appears and tells him that no matter which road he takes, he will find happiness with Ann and will marry her only. Then follow three dreams, one taking place in the North, one in the West, and one in his home town. When he awakes, he finds that Lewis was greeted with the same apparition and has decided to marry Rose, while David marries Ann.

== Cast ==
- Pauline Frederick as Rose Merritt
- John Bowers as David Marsh
- Richard Tucker as Lewis Marsh
- Jane Novak as Ann Hardy
- Hardee Kirkland as Mr. Hardy
- Willard Louis as McPherson
- Maude George as Fate
- Maurice B. Flynn as Colby
