= The Lady from Cheyenne =

1941 American comedy western film directed by Frank Lloyd

- Directed by: Frank Lloyd
- Written by: Jonathan Finn; Theresa Oaks; Warren Duff; Kathryn Scola
- Produced by: Jack H. Skirball; Frank Lloyd
- Starring: Loretta Young; Robert Preston; Edward Arnold; Frank Craven
- Cinematography: Milton R. Krasner
- Edited by: Edward Curtiss
- Music by: Frank Skinner
- Production company: Frank Lloyd Productions
- Distributed by: Universal Pictures
- Release date: April 11, 1941
- Running time: 88 minutes
- Country: United States
- Language: English
- Budget: $545,000

The Lady from Cheyenne is a 1941 American comedy western film directed by Frank Lloyd and starring Loretta Young, Robert Preston and Edward Arnold.

== Plot ==
In the 1860s, after receiving an inheritance a Philadelphia Quaker school teacher heads west to Wyoming to establish a new school to educate settler children. However, she encounters a corrupt tycoon who is determined to gain control of the water rights of her schoolhouse. She eventually lobbies to gain women the right to vote in local elections, and defeats the villain with the assistance of a lawyer whom she eventually marries.

== Cast ==
- Loretta Young as Annie Morgan
- Robert Preston as Steve Lewis
- Edward Arnold as James 'Jim' Cork
- Frank Craven as Hank Foreman
- Gladys George as Elsie
- Jessie Ralph as Mrs. McGuinness
- Stanley Fields as Jerry Stover
- Willie Best as George
- Samuel S. Hinds as Governor Howard
- Spencer Charters as Dr. McGuinness
- Clare Verdera as Mrs. Matthews
- Al Bridge as Mr. Matthews
- Charles Williams as Clerk
- Erville Alderson as Ike Fairchild
- Emmett Vogan as Stanton
- Roger Imhof as Uncle Bill
- William B. Davidson as Nye Dunbar
- James Kirkwood as Politician
- Wade Boteler as Turk
- Harry Cording as Mike
- Richard Alexander as Henchman (uncredited)
- Ethan Laidlaw as Waiter (uncredited)

== Production ==
The film was shot at Universal Studios, and on location in the Mojave Desert. It was made for $535,000, somewhat under its scheduled budget of $622,000.

== Bibliography ==
- Dick, Bernard F. Hollywood Madonna: Loretta Young. University Press of Mississippi, 2011.
