= Norbert Brodine =

American cinematographer (1896–1970)

Nobert Brodine
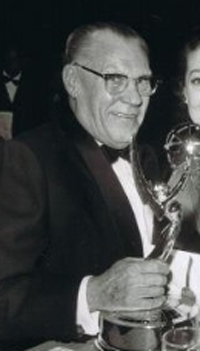
- Norbert Brodine at the 1957 Emmys
- Born: Norbert F. Brodin; December 16, 1896; Saint Joseph, Missouri, US
- Died: February 28, 1970 (aged 73); Los Angeles, California, US
- Resting place: Forest Lawn Memorial Park, Glendale
- Education: Columbia University
- Occupation: Cinematographer
- Years active: 1919–1960
- Spouse: Catherine Ferguson

Nobert Brodine (December 16, 1896 – February 28, 1970), also credited as Norbert F. Brodin and Norbert Brodin, was an American film cinematographer. The Saint Joseph, Missouri-born cameraman worked on over 100 films in his career before retiring from film making in 1953, at which time he worked exclusively in television until 1960.

== Career ==
Brodine began his cameraman career working in a camera shop and later building on that experience in the Army Signal Corps, as an army photographer during World War I. After studying at Columbia University, he began working as a still photographer in Hollywood before moving to motion pictures in 1919. He began working exclusively for Hal Roach Studios in 1937 and then moved on to 20th Century Fox in 1943.

Brodine's films include the sought after lost film A Blind Bargain (1922) starring Lon Chaney, This Thing Called Love (1929), The Death Kiss (1932), Counsellor at Law (1933), Deluge (1933), The House on 92nd Street (1945), Somewhere in the Night (1946), Boomerang (1947), Kiss of Death (1947), Thieves' Highway (1949), and 5 Fingers (1952).

Brodine shot several films with Laurel and Hardy at both Roach and Fox, such as Pick a Star (1937), Swiss Miss (1938), The Dancing Masters (1943), and The Bullfighters (1945). Brodine moved back to Hal Roach Studios to end his film career in the early 1950s. He worked in television from 1952 to 1960, and finished his career on the well-known television series The Loretta Young Show, for which he won a Primetime Emmy Award.

Brodine died at the age of 73, on February 28, 1970. He was buried at Forest Lawn Memorial Park Cemetery in Glendale, Los Angeles County, California.

== Filmography ==
=== Films ===
- Almost a Husband (1919)
- Toby's Bow (1919)
- The Gay Lord Quex (1919)
- The Great Accident (1920)
- Dollars and Sense (1920)
- Going Some (1920)
- Stop Thief! (1920)
- Officer 666 (1920)
- A Tale of Two Worlds (1921)
- The Invisible Power (1921)
- The Man from Lost River (1921)
- The Grim Comedian (1921)
- Grand Larceny (1922)
- Remembrance (1922)
- The Sin Flood (1922)
- A Blind Bargain (1922)
- The Voice from the Minaret (1923)
- Look Your Best (1923)
- Brass (1923)
- Within the Law (1923)
- Dulcy (1923)
- Pleasure Mad (1923)
- Black Oxen (1923)
- The Sea Hawk (1924)
- The Foolish Virgin (1924)
- The Silent Watcher (1924)
- Her Husband's Secret (1925)
- Winds of Chance (1925)
- What Fools Men (1925)
- The Splendid Road (1925)
- Paris at Midnight (1926)
- The Wise Guy (1926)
- The Eagle of the Sea (1926)
- Children of Divorce (1927)
- Poor Girls (1927)
- Rich Men's Sons (1927)
- The Romantic Age (1927)
- The Bush Leaguer (1927)
- The Clown (1927)
- One Round Hogan (1927)
- A Reno Divorce (1927)
- Brass Knuckles (1927)
- The Little Snob (1928)
- Turn Back the Hours (1928)
- Pay as You Enter (1928)
- The Lion and the Mouse (1928)
- Five and Ten Cent Annie (1928)
- Beware of Bachelors (1928)
- Paris Bound (1929)
- Big News (1929)
- Her Private Affair (1929)
- Rich People (1929)
- This Thing Called Love (1929)
- The Divorcee (1930)
- Holiday (1930)
- Let Us Be Gay (1930)
- Beyond Victory (1931)
- Rebound (1931)
- The Pagan Lady (1931)
- The Guardsman (1931)
- The Passionate Plumber (1932)
- Jenny Lind (1932)
- The Beast of the City (1932)
- Night Court (1932)
- Bachelor's Affairs (1932)
- Unashamed (1932)
- Wild Girl (1932)
- Uptown New York (1932)
- The Death Kiss (1932)
- Whistling in the Dark (1933)
- Clear All Wires! (1933)
- Made on Broadway (1933)
- Deluge (1933)
- Broadway to Hollywood (1933)
- Counsellor at Law (1933)
- Madame Spy (1934)
- The Crosby Case (1934)
- Little Man, What Now? (1934)
- Love Birds (1934)
- The Human Side (1934)
- One Exciting Adventure (1934)
- There's Always Tomorrow (1934)
- Cheating Cheaters (1934)
- The Good Fairy (1935)
- Princess O'Hara (1935)
- Lady Tubbs (1935)
- She Gets Her Man (1935)
- The Affair of Susan (1935)
- East of Java (1935)
- Don't Get Personal (1936)
- Nobody's Fool (1936)
- Libeled Lady (1936)
- Nobody's Baby (1937)
- Pick a Star (1937)
- Topper (1937)
- Merrily We Live (1938)
- Feed 'em and Weep (1938)
- Swiss Miss (1938)
- The Awful Tooth (1938)
- Hide and Shriek (1938)
- There Goes My Heart (1938)
- Topper Takes a Trip (1938)
- Zenobia (1939)
- Captain Fury (1939)
- Lady of the Tropics (1939)
- The Housekeeper's Daughter (1939)
- Of Mice and Men (1939)
- One Million B.C. (1940)
- Turnabout (1940)
- Captain Caution (1940)
- Road Show (1941)
- Topper Returns (1941)
- Model Wife (1941)
- Lady for a Night (1942)
- Dr. Gillespie's Criminal Case (1943)
- The Dancing Masters (1943)
- The Bullfighters (1945)
- Don Juan Quilligan (1945)
- The House on 92nd Street (1945)
- Sentimental Journey (1946)
- Somewhere in the Night (1946)
- 13 Rue Madeleine (1947)
- Boomerang! (1947)
- Kiss of Death (1947)
- Sitting Pretty (1948)
- Road House (1948)
- I Was a Male War Bride (1949)
- Thieves' Highway (1949)
- Right Cross (1950)
- The Frogmen (1951)
- The Desert Fox (1951)
- 5 Fingers (1952)
- Captain Scarface (1953)

=== Television ===
Racket Squad (1952–1953), TV series, 40 episodes

- The Case of the Matchmaker (1952)
- Small Town Racket (1952)
- Anyone Can Be a Sucker (1952)
- The Strange Case of James Doyle (1952)
- One More Dream (1952)
- Check and Double Check (1952)
- Heartbreak for Sale (1952)
- Charge It, Please (1952)
- A Letter from Tessie (1952)
- The Expensive Tumble (1952)
- Beauty for Hire (1952)
- The Suit Club (1952)
- The Front Man (1952)
- At Your Service (1952)
- The Label Switchers (1952)
- Blessed Expense (1952)
- Strictly Legal (1952)
- The Elephant in Stockings (1952)
- False Tape (1952)
- The Christmas Caper (1952)
- The System (1953)
- Baby Face Con (1953)
- The Case of the Dancing Lady (1953)
- His Brother's Keeper (1953)
- Friend of the People (1953)
- Antique Racket (1953)
- Girl in the Mink Coat (1953)
- The Big Touch (1953)
- The White Carnation (1953)
- Take a Little, Leave a Little (1953)
- The Case of Lady Luck (1953)
- The Gentler Sex (1953)
- Sale Value (1953)
- Phony Photo Contest (1953)
- Fraudulent Nursery School (1953)
- Romance Unlimited (1953)
- Impatient Heir (1953)
- Diamond Smugglers (1953)
- Sting of Fate (1953)
- The Sure Thing (1953)

Letter to Loretta (a.k.a. The Loretta Young Show) (1953–1960), TV series, 65 episodes

- Trial Run (1953)
- The Mirror (1953)
- Prisoner at One O'Clock (1953)
- Girl on a Flagpole (1953)
- Turn of the Card (1953)
- Earthquake (1953)
- The One That Got Away (1953)
- Kid Stuff (1953)
- The Bronte Story (1953)
- Thanksgiving in Beaver Run (1953)
- Love Story (1953)
- Laughing Boy (1953)
- The Faith of Chata (1953)
- The Night My Father Came Home (1953)
- Hotel Irritant (1953)
- Inga (1954)
- Lady Killer (1954)
- Secret Answer (1954)
- Big Little Lie (1954)
- The Hollywood Story (1954)
- A Family Out of Us (1954)
- Act of Faith (1954)
- The New York Story (1954)
- Nobody's Boy (1954)
- The Count of Ten (1954)
- The Clara Schumann Story (1954)
- Son, This Is Your Father (1954)
- The First Man to Ask Her (1954)
- Man's Estate (1954)
- Forest Ranger (1954)
- The Enchanted Schoolteacher (1954)
- The Judgment (1954)
- Oh, My Aching Heart (1954)
- Dear Madge (1954)
- Something Always Happens (1954)
- Lady in Wet Paint (1954)
- Big Jim (1954)
- The Girl Who Knew (1955)
- Tale of a Cayuse (1955)
- Week-End in Winnetka (1955)
- Reunion (1955)
- Slander (1955)
- Man in the Ring (1955)
- A Ticket for May (1956)
- The Challenge (1956)
- The Pearl (1956)
- Tightwad Millionaire (1956)
- Gesundheit (1956)
- His Inheritance (1956)
- The Wise One (1956)
- The Cardinal's Secret (1956)
- Incident in Kawi (1956)
- Take Care of My Child (1956)
- Miss Ashley's Demon (1957)
- The Bad Apple (1957)
- Rummage Sale (1957)
- The Countess (1957)
- The Defense (1957)
- Understanding Heart (1957)
- The Little Witness (1957)
- Operation Snowball (1958)
- Seed from the East (1959)
- 810 Franklin Street (1959)
- The Road (1959)
- Mask of Evidence (1959)
- Faith, Hope and Mr. Flaherty (1960)

Crown Theatre with Gloria Swanson (1954–1955), TV series, 4 episodes

- Mr. Influence (1954)
- Was It Red? (1954)
- My Last Duchess (1954)
- The Antique Shop (1955)

Our Gang (a.k.a. Little Rascals) (1955), series cinematography for 1938

== Awards ==
Year	Award	Category
1939	Nominated – Oscar	Best Cinematography "Merrily We Live" (1938)
1940	Nominated – Oscar	Best Cinematography, Black-and-White "Lady of the Tropics" (1939)
1952	Nominated – Oscar	Best Cinematography, Black-and-White "The Frogmen" (1951)
1955	Nominated – Primetime Emmy	Best Direction of Photography "Letter to Loretta" (1954); For episode "The Clara Schumann Story"
1956	Nominated – Primetime Emmy	Best Cinematography for Television "Letter to Loretta" (1955); For episode "I Remember the Rani"
1957	Won – Primetime Emmy	Best Cinematography for Television "Letter to Loretta" (1956); For episode "The Pearl"
1958	Nominated – Primetime Emmy	Best Cinematography for Television "Letter to Loretta" (1957); For episode "Miss Ashley's Demon"
