= Josephine McLaughlin =

American screenwriter (1889–1977)

Bradley King
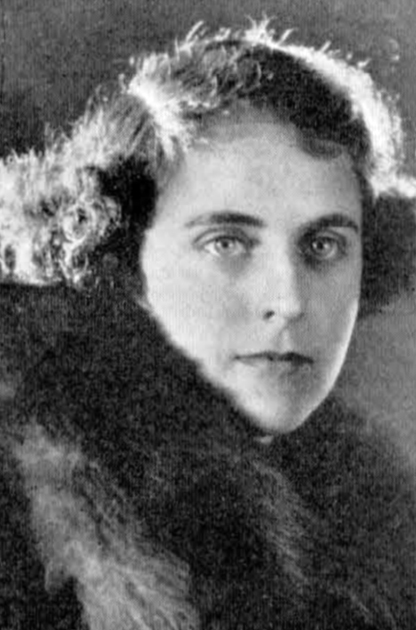
- Bradley King in 1923
- Born: Josephine McLaughlin; July 8, 1889; New York
- Died: August 24, 1977 (aged 83); Century City, California
- Years active: 1920–1947

Josephine McLaughlin (July 8, 1889 – August 24, 1977) was a screenwriter who wrote 56 scripts for films between 1920 and 1947. All but one of her 40 silent films are lost, but most of her 20 or so sound films still exist. Bradley King was a pen name she used.

== Biography ==
McLaughlin was born in New York city, possibly on July 8, and most probably in 1889. Other sources give her birth date as 1894, but she was listed as age 16 in the 1905 census, and Dettwyler confirms her birth date with other extant records. She was educated at the Academy of the Sacred Heart (later Kenwood) in Albany, New York.

McLaughlin recalled that she entered the business after selling a few short stories to pulp magazines and arranged a meeting with silent era filmmaker Thomas Ince. "I've read some of your stuff and I think your literary style is absolutely lousy," she later recounted Ince saying. "But you've got a good sense of drama, and I'll give you $50 a week." Five years later, she was making $1,500 a week.

She was married four times. One was a short marriage to silent film director John Griffith Wray, who died just nine months after their October 1928 wedding. After a later husband, George Hiram Boyd, lost most of her $400,000 fortune ($9.2 million today) to bad investments, she divorced him in 1940. She married Albert C. Windley in 1944. They remained married until his death in 1969.

She sometimes went by the name Bradley King Windley. She wrote her last screenplay for the 1947 movie That's My Man. She died in 1977.

== Partial filmography ==
- Jack Straws (1916)
- Footlights and Shadows (1920)
- The Girl from Nowhere (1921)
- Lying Lips (1921)
- I Am Guilty (1921)
- Beyond the Crossroads (1922)
- A Man of Action (1923)
- Anna Christie (1923)
- Christine of the Hungry Heart (1924)
- The Chorus Lady (1924)
- Enticement (1925)
- When the Door Opened (1925)
- The Gilded Butterfly (1926)
- The Palace of Pleasure (1926)
- Hell's Four Hundred (1926)
- The Return of Peter Grimm (1926)
- The Lovelorn (1927)
- Under the Black Eagle (1928)
- Diamond Handcuffs (1928)
- Scarlet Seas (1929)
- Drag (1929)
- Weary River (1929)
- The Squall (1929)
- Young Nowheres (1929)
- Drag (1929)
- Dark Streets (1929)
- Son of the Gods (1930)
- Wild Company (1930)
- The Way of All Men (1930)
- The Lash (1930)
- The Mask Falls (1931)
- A Passport to Hell (1932)
- Six Hours to Live (1932)
- Humanity (1933)
- Let's Live Tonight (1935)
- Maid of Salem (1937)
