= William C. Foster =

American cinematographer (1880–1923)

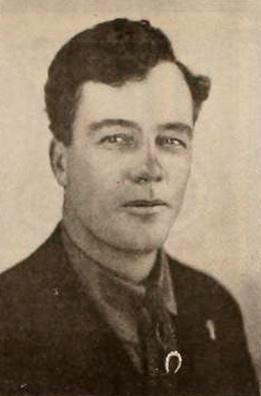
- Foster in 1920
- Born: December 28, 1880; Bushnell, Illinois
- Died: January 18, 1923 (aged 42)
- Occupation: Cinematographer
- Title: A.S.C. Founding member

William C. Foster (December 28, 1880 – January 18, 1923) was a pioneer of cinematography.

== Biography ==
Foster was born in Bushnell, Illinois, on December 28, 1880. and went to work for the Chicago-based Selig Polyscope Company in 1901, at a time when Selig was turning out 50' and 100' actualities and trick films. Foster left Selig in May 1911 to join Carl Laemmle’s Independent Moving Pictures Company (IMP). In 1915, he signed with the Equitable Motion Picture Corporation, working in New York and Florida. Foster was lead cinematographer on the first five two-reelers Charlie Chaplin made for Mutual Film Corporation in 1916: The Floorwalker, The Fireman, One A.M., The Count, and The Vagabond. He later shot a number of pictures for director Frank Lloyd, including A Tale of Two Cities (Fox, 1917) and The Silver Horde (Goldwyn, 1920), and also worked with director Lois Weber.

Foster was part of the reorganization of the two groups, the Cinema Camera Club and the Static Club of America, that would merge to become the American Society of Cinematographers. He served on the society's board of governor and was its first vice president.

Foster died on January 18, 1923, from complications related to syphilis.

== Partial filmography ==
- The Vampire (1910)
- Shon the Piper (1913)
- The Career of Waterloo Peterson (1914) (as William Foster)
- The Floorwalker (1916)
- The Fireman (1916) (as W.C. Foster)
- The Vagabond (1916)
- Sins of Her Parent (1916)
- The Price of Silence (1917) (as Billy Foster)
- A Tale of Two Cities (1917) (as Billy Foster)
- American Methods (1917) (as Billy Foster)
- When a Man Sees Red (1917) (as Billy Foster)
- Les misérables (1917)
- The Heart of a Lion (1917) (as Billy Foster)
- The Blindness of Divorce (1918) (as Billy Foster)
- True Blue (1918)
- The Rainbow Trail (1918) (*as Billy Foster;per AFI)
- For Freedom (1918) (as Billy Foster)
- The Man Hunter (1919) (as Billy Foster)
- The Man Who Turned White (1919)
- The Pagan God (1919)
- A Woman of Pleasure (1919)
- When Dawn Came (1920)
- The Silver Horde (1920)
- What's Worth While? (1921)
- Oliver Twist, Jr. (1921)
- Too Wise Wives (1921) (as Wm. C. Foster)
- Charlie Chaplin Cavalcade (1938)
