= The Man Hunter (1919 film) =

1919 film

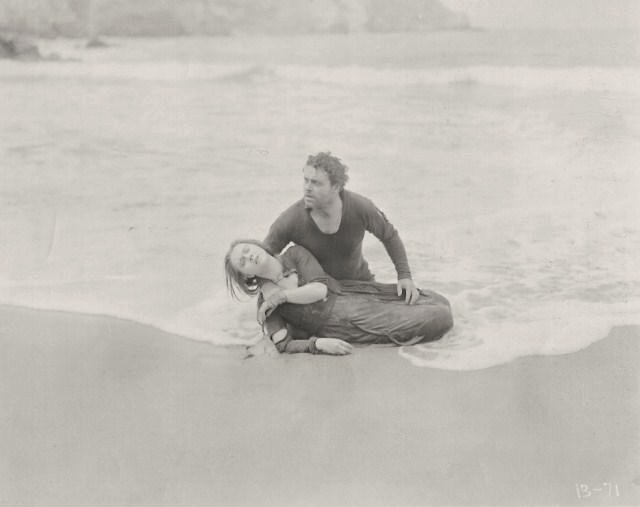
- still photo: William Farnum and Louise Lovely.
- Directed by: Frank Lloyd
- Written by: Frank Lloyd(story & scenario)
- Produced by: William Fox
- Starring: William Farnum; Louise Lovely
- Cinematography: Billy Foster
- Distributed by: Fox Film Corporation
- Release date: March 2, 1919
- Running time: 6 reels
- Country: United States
- Languages: Silent; English intertitles

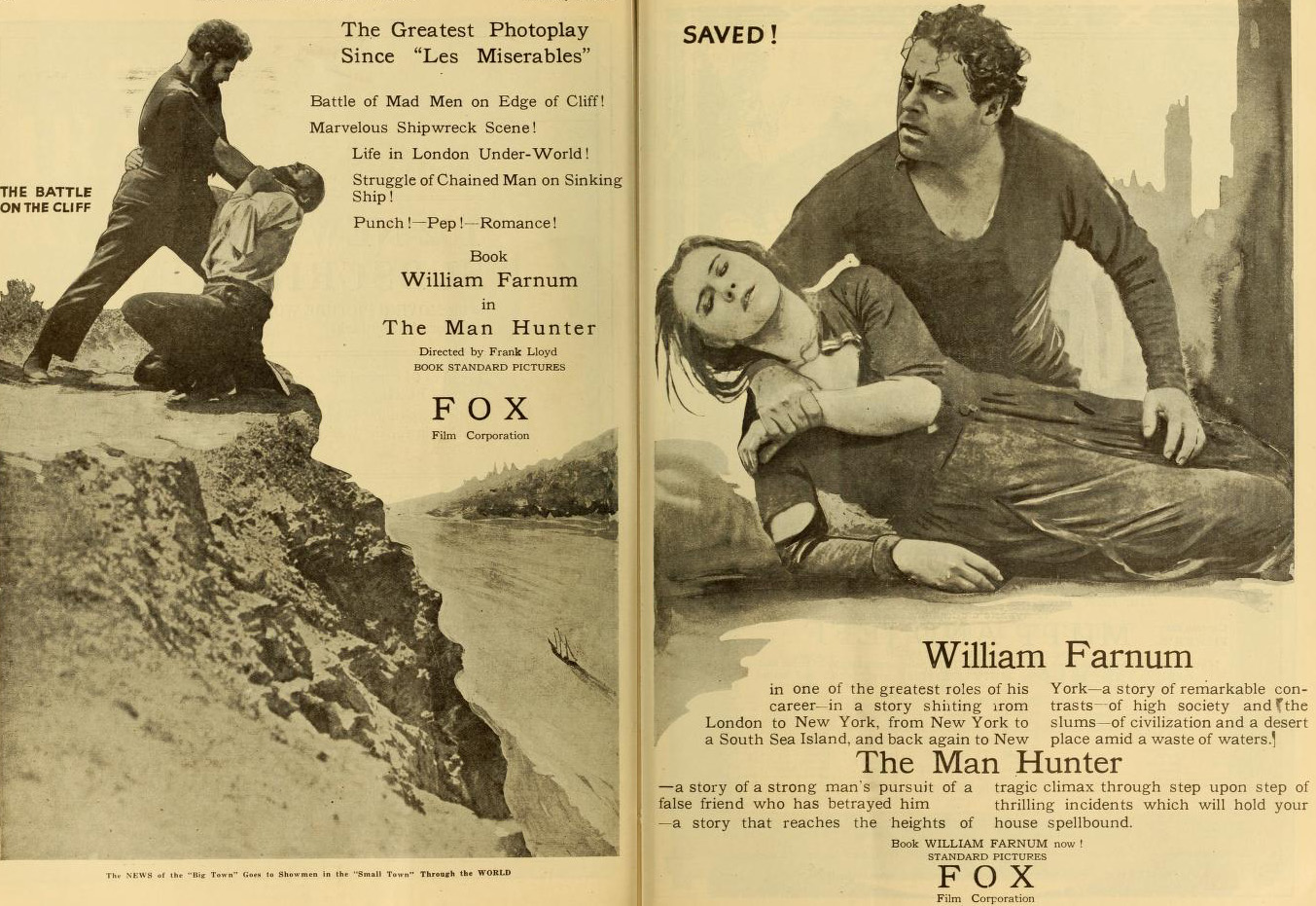
Advertisement.

The Man Hunter is a lost 1919 silent film western drama directed by Frank Lloyd and starring William Farnum. Fox Film Corporation produced and distributed the picture.

== Cast ==
- William Farnum - George Arnold
- Louise Lovely - Helen Garfield
- Charles Clary - Henry Benton
- Marc Robbins - Joseph Carlin
- Leatrice Joy - Florence

== See also ==
- 1937 Fox vault fire
