= Nancy Caswell =

American film actress

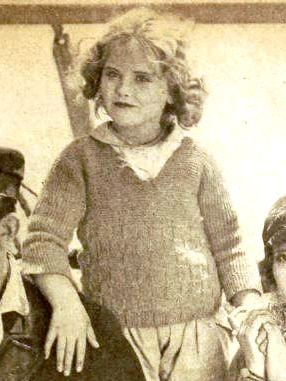
- Still from Under Crimson Skies, 1920
- Born: October 28, 1913; Los Angeles, California
- Died: February 2, 1987 (aged 73); Miami, Florida
- Occupation: Actress

Nancy Caswell (October 28, 1913 – February 2, 1987) was an American child actress of the silent era and later as an adult in talkies, including a Three Stooges work. As a baby she was proclaimed the "perfect baby" and was the youngest actress, with roles when she was as young as three.

== Selected filmography ==
- Riders of the Purple Sage (1918)
- The Day She Paid (1919)
- The Mother of His Children (1920)
- The Two-Fisted Lover (1920)
- Under Crimson Skies (1920)
- Shore Acres (1920)
- The Flame of Life (1923)
- Scareheads (1931)
- Horses' Collars (1935)
- Custer's Last Stand (1936)
