= Frank Lloyd =

British film director (1886–1960)

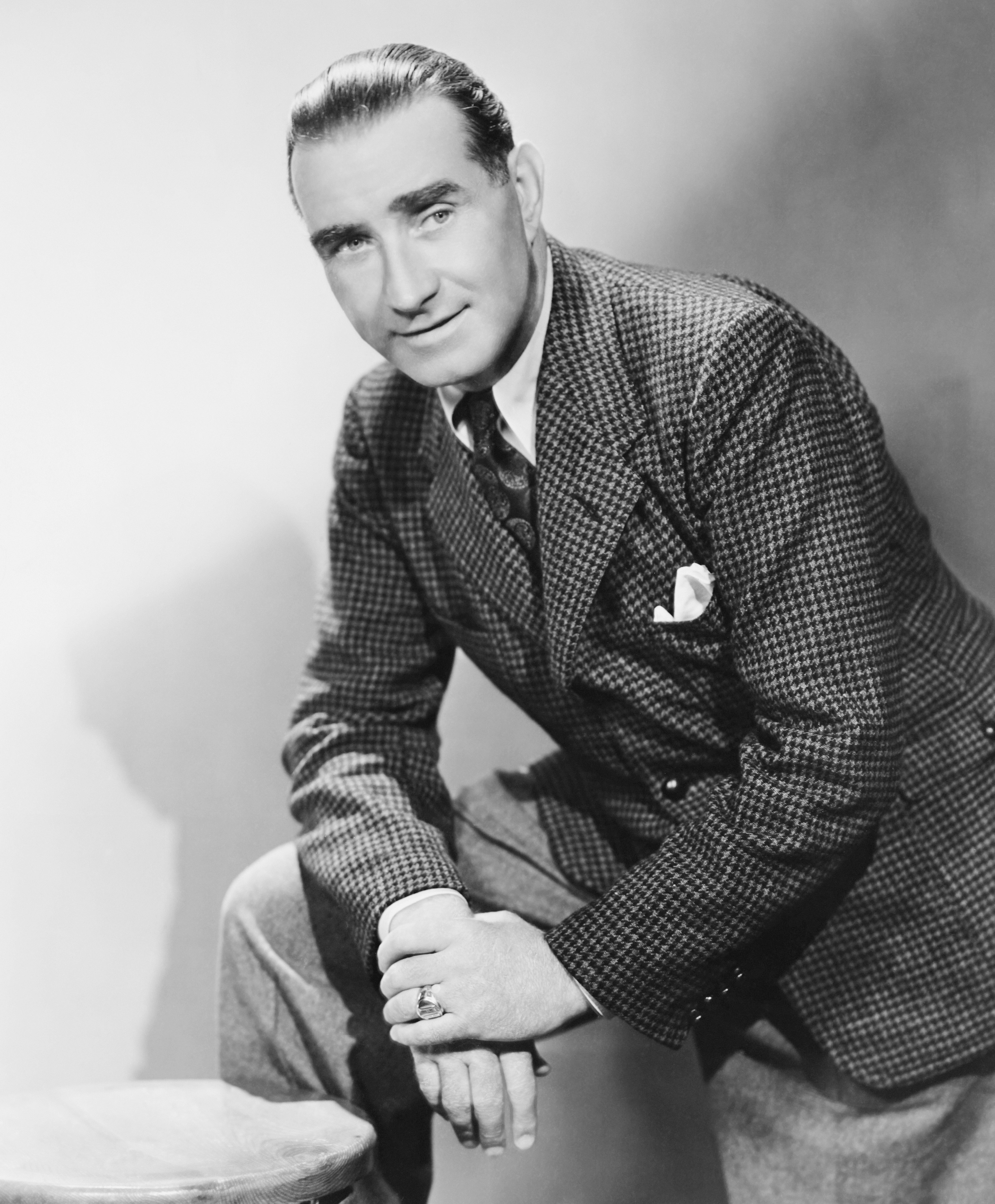
- Lloyd c. 1939
- Born: Frank William George Lloyd; 2 February 1886; Cambuslang, Lanarkshire, Scotland
- Died: 10 August 1960 (aged 74); Santa Monica, California, U.S.
- Resting place: Forest Lawn Memorial Park (Glendale)
- Occupations: Film director; actor; scriptwriter; film producer
- Years active: 1913–1955
- Spouse(s): Alma Haller (m. 1913; died 1952) Virginia Kellogg (m. 1955)

Frank William George Lloyd (2 February 1886 – 10 August 1960) was a Scottish-American film director, screenwriter, producer and actor. He was among the founders of the Academy of Motion Picture Arts and Sciences, and was its president from 1934 to 1935.

He is Scotland's first Academy Award winner and is unique in film history, having received three Oscar nominations in 1929 for his work on a silent film (The Divine Lady), a part-talkie (Weary River) and a full talkie (Drag). He won for The Divine Lady. He was nominated and won again in 1933 for his adaptation of Noël Coward's Cavalcade and received a further Best Director nomination in 1935 for perhaps his most successful film, Mutiny on the Bounty.

In 1957, he was awarded the George Eastman Award, given by George Eastman House for distinguished contribution to the art of film. In 1960, Lloyd received a star on the Hollywood Walk of Fame for his contributions to the motion pictures industry, at 6667 Hollywood Boulevard.

== Early life and career ==
Lloyd was born in Cambuslang, on the outskirts of Glasgow, the youngest of seven children. His mother Jane was Scottish and his father Edmund Lloyd was Welsh, a mechanical engineer. The family travelled the country until his father was injured and gave up engineering. They settled in Shepherd's Bush, London, where the family ran a pub. Lloyd worked in a shoe shop, sang in choral groups and joined a vaudeville group.

In 1909 he immigrated to Canada where he worked on a ranch in Alberta for a year. He also erected poles and wrote for a telephone company, then joined a travelling show as an actor and singer. The show wound up in Los Angeles in 1913 and Lloyd decided to stay there and act in Hollywood films.

== Film director ==
=== Paramount ===
He began directing shorts for Paramount and moved to longer running films: The Gentleman from Indiana (1915), Jane (1915), The Reform Candidate (1916), The Tongues of Men (1916), The Call of the Cumberlands (1916), Madame la Presidente (1916) with Anna Held, The Code of Marcia Gray (1916), David Garrick (1916 film) (1916), The Making of Maddalena (1916), An International Marriage (1916), and The Stronger Love (1916). The Intrigue (1916) was produced through Pallas Films and released through Paramount. Lloyd's biographer argued his early films "are not 'masterpieces,' but they are on a par with films from other secondary directors of the period. In other words, they are not comparable to those directed by D.W. Griffith, but are as good as those directed by Allan Dwan."

=== Fox ===
Lloyd directed Sins of Her Parent (1916) at Fox, and The World and the Woman (1916) with Jeanne Eagles for Tranhouser. Back at Fox he did The Kingdom of Love (1917), and a series of films starring William Farnum" The Price of Silence (1917), A Tale of Two Cities (1917) from the novel by Charles Dickens, American Methods (1917), When a Man Sees Red (1917), Les Misérables (1917), The Heart of a Lion (1917), True Blue (1918), Riders of the Purple Sage (1918) from the novel by Zane Grey and its sequel The Rainbow Trail (1918), For Freedom (1918), and The Man Hunter (1919). Without Farnum, Lloyd directed The Blindness of Divorce (1918).

=== Goldwyn ===
At Goldwyn he made Pitfalls of a Big City (1919),The World and Its Woman (1919), The Loves of Letty (1919), The Woman in Room 13 (1920), The Silver Horde (1920 film) (1920), Madame X (1920) with Pauline Frederick, The Great Lover (1920), A Tale of Two Worlds (1921), Roads of Destiny (1921) with Frederick, A Voice in the Dark (1921), The Invisible Power (1921), The Grim Comedian (1921), and The Man from Lost River (1921) plus The Sin Flood (1922) with Richard Dix.

=== First National ===
Lloyd directed some films for First National with Norma Talmadge: The Eternal Flame (1921), The Voice from the Minaret (1922), Within the Law (1923) and Ashes of Vengeance (1923).

Also for that studio was Oliver Twist (1922) with Lon Chaney and Jackie Coogan, and Black Oxen (1924).

He had his own company at First National, Frank Lloyd Productions. They made The Sea Hawk (1924), a swashbuckler with Milton Sills, then The Silent Watcher (1924), Her Husband's Secret (1925), Winds of Chance (1925), The Splendid Road (1926), and The Wise Guy (1926).

=== Paramount ===
At Paramount Lloyd made The Eagle of the Sea (1926), Children of Divorce (1927), Adoration (1928) with Billie Dove, The Divine Lady (1929) with Corinne Griffith, and Dark Streets (1929). Lloyd won the Academy Award for Best director for The Divine Lady.

There were several films starring Richard Barthemless: Weary River (1929), Drag (1929), Young Nowheres (1930), Son of the Gods (1930), and The Lash (1930). He was Oscar nominated for Best Director for Drag and Weary River.

There was also The Way of All Men (1930), a remake of Lloyds' own The Sin Flood, The Right of Way (1931), and East Lynne (1931).

For Howard Hughes, Lloyd did The Age for Love (1931). Back at Fox he made A Passport to Hell (1932) then Cavalcade (1933), which won Lloyd the Oscar for Best Director.

Lloyd then made what was his favourite film, Berkeley Square (1933), starring Leslie Howard, followed by Hoop-La (1933) the final film of Clara Bow and Servants' Entrance (1934) with Janet Gaynor.

== Mutiny on the Bounty and later career ==
Lloyd had a huge hit with Mutiny on the Bounty (1935) at MGM which earned him another Oscar nomination for Best Director.

He followed it with Under Two Flags (1936) at Fox, a French Foreign Legion tale with Ronald Colman.

=== Paramount ===
At Paramount Lloyd made more historical films: Maid of Salem (1937) with Claudette Colbert, Wells Fargo (1937) with Joel McCrea, If I Were King (1938) with Colman and Rulers of the Sea (1938) with Douglas Fairbanks Jnr, which was a commercial disappointment.

=== Universal ===
Lloyd made The Howards of Virginia (1940) at Columbia with Cary Grant. At Universal he set up his own company. He directed This Woman Is Mine (1941), and The Lady from Cheyenne (1941), and his company produced Saboteur (1942) from Alfred Hitchcock, The Spoilers (1942) with John Wayne and Randolph Scott, and Invisible Agent (1942).

He was one of several directors on RKO's Forever and a Day (1943). Lloyd had a big hit with James Cagney's Blood on the Sun (1945). He was Oscar nominated for Best Director of a Documentary with The Last Bomb (1945). Lloyd also served in the air force. He retired from filmmaking in 1946, intending to live on a ranch.

=== Final films ===
Lloyd's wife died in 1952 and he came out of retirement to make two films at Republic, The Shanghai Story (1954) and The Last Command (1955) a film about Jim Bowie. When he remarried in 1955 he retired again.

== Personal life ==
Frank Lloyd was married to actress Alma Haller from 11 July 1913, until her death on 16 March 1952. By 1955, Lloyd married Virginia Kellogg, and remained married until Lloyd's death on 10 August 1960 at age 74. Lloyd was buried at Forest Lawn Memorial Park in Glendale, California.

== Reputation ==
Frank Lloyd does not have a particularly significant legacy. Biographer Anthony Slide puts this down to two elements. The first cited is the dismissal of Lloyd's work by Andrew Sarris who compared the director with Cecil B. de Mille. The second element is that Lloyd "was what is best described as a studio director. His style is as much the style of the studio as it is his own. He did not make waves; he did not overly publicize and promote himself. What he did was for the good of the studio – not for his own ego. [...] He put the studio first. He seldom went over-budget. He brought his films in on schedule. He worked well with actors and actresses, some of whom were known to be temperamental."

== Selected filmography ==
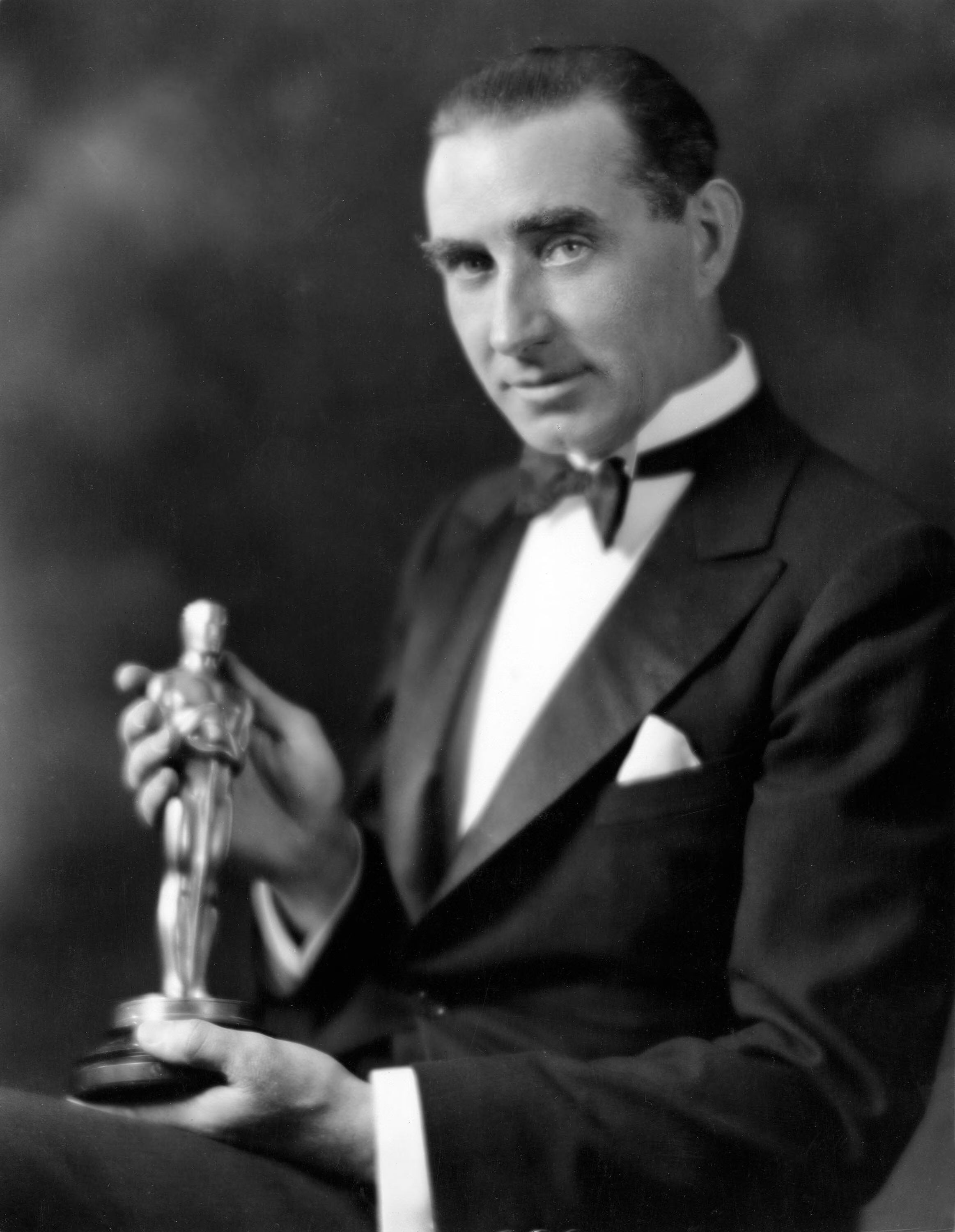
Frank Lloyd holding his first Academy Award for Best Director, winning for The Divine Lady (1928).

- Damon and Pythias (1914) (actor)
- The Test (1914) (actor) (short)
- The Spy (1914) (actor)
- The Opened Shutters (1914) (actor)
- The Black Box (1915) (actor)
- The Gentleman from Indiana (1915)
- Jane (1915)
- The Reform Candidate (1915)
- Sins of Her Parent (1916)
- The Tongues of Men (1916)
- The Code of Marcia Gray (1916)
- The Intrigue (1916)
- David Garrick (1916)
- The Call of the Cumberlands (1916)
- Madame la Presidente (1916)
- The Making of Maddalena (1916)
- An International Marriage (1916)
- The Stronger Love (1916)
- Sins of Her Parent (1916)
- The World and the Woman (1916)
- A Tale of Two Cities (1917)
- The Kingdom of Love (1917)
- The Heart of a Lion (1917)
- Les Miserables (1917)
- When a Man Sees Red (1917)
- American Methods (1917)
- The Price of Silence (1917)
- The Rainbow Trail (1918)
- For Freedom (1918)
- Riders of the Purple Sage (1918)
- The Blindness of Divorce (1918)
- The Loves of Letty (1919)
- The World and Its Woman (1919)
- Pitfalls of a Big City (1919)
- The Man Hunter (1919)
- Madame X (1920)
- The Silver Horde (1920)
- The Woman in Room 13 (1920)
- The Great Lover (1920)
- The Invisible Power (1921)
- The Grim Comedian (1921)
- The Man from Lost River (1921)
- Roads of Destiny (1921)
- Oliver Twist (1922)
- The Eternal Flame (1922)
- The Sin Flood (1922)
- Black Oxen (1923)
- The Voice from the Minaret (1923)
- Within the Law (1923)
- Ashes of Vengeance (1923)
- The Sea Hawk (1924)
- The Silent Watcher (1924)
- Her Husband's Secret (1925)
- The Splendid Road (1925)
- Winds of Chance (1925)
- The Wise Guy (1926)
- The Eagle of the Sea (1926)
- Children of Divorce (1927)
- Adoration (1928)
- The Divine Lady (1929)
- Young Nowheres (1929)
- Weary River (1929)
- Drag (1929)
- Dark Streets (1929)
- The Lash (1930)
- The Way of All Men (1930)
- The Age for Love (1931)
- East Lynne (1931)
- A Passport to Hell (1932)
- Cavalcade (1933)
- Berkeley Square (1933)
- Hoop-La (1933)
- Servants' Entrance (1934)
- Mutiny on the Bounty (1935)
- Under Two Flags (1936)
- Wells Fargo (1937)
- Maid of Salem (1937)
- If I Were King (1938)
- Rulers of the Sea (1939)
- The Howards of Virginia (1940)
- This Woman Is Mine (1941)
- The Lady from Cheyenne (1941)
- The Spoilers (1942) (producer)
- Forever and a Day (1943)
- Blood on the Sun (1945)
- The Shanghai Story (1954)
- The Last Command (1955)

== See also ==
- List of Academy Award winners and nominees from Great Britain

Non-profit organization positions
Preceded by J. Theodore Reed	President of the Academy of Motion Picture Arts and Sciences; 1934–1935	Succeeded by Frank Capra
