= Weary River =

1929 film by Frank Lloyd

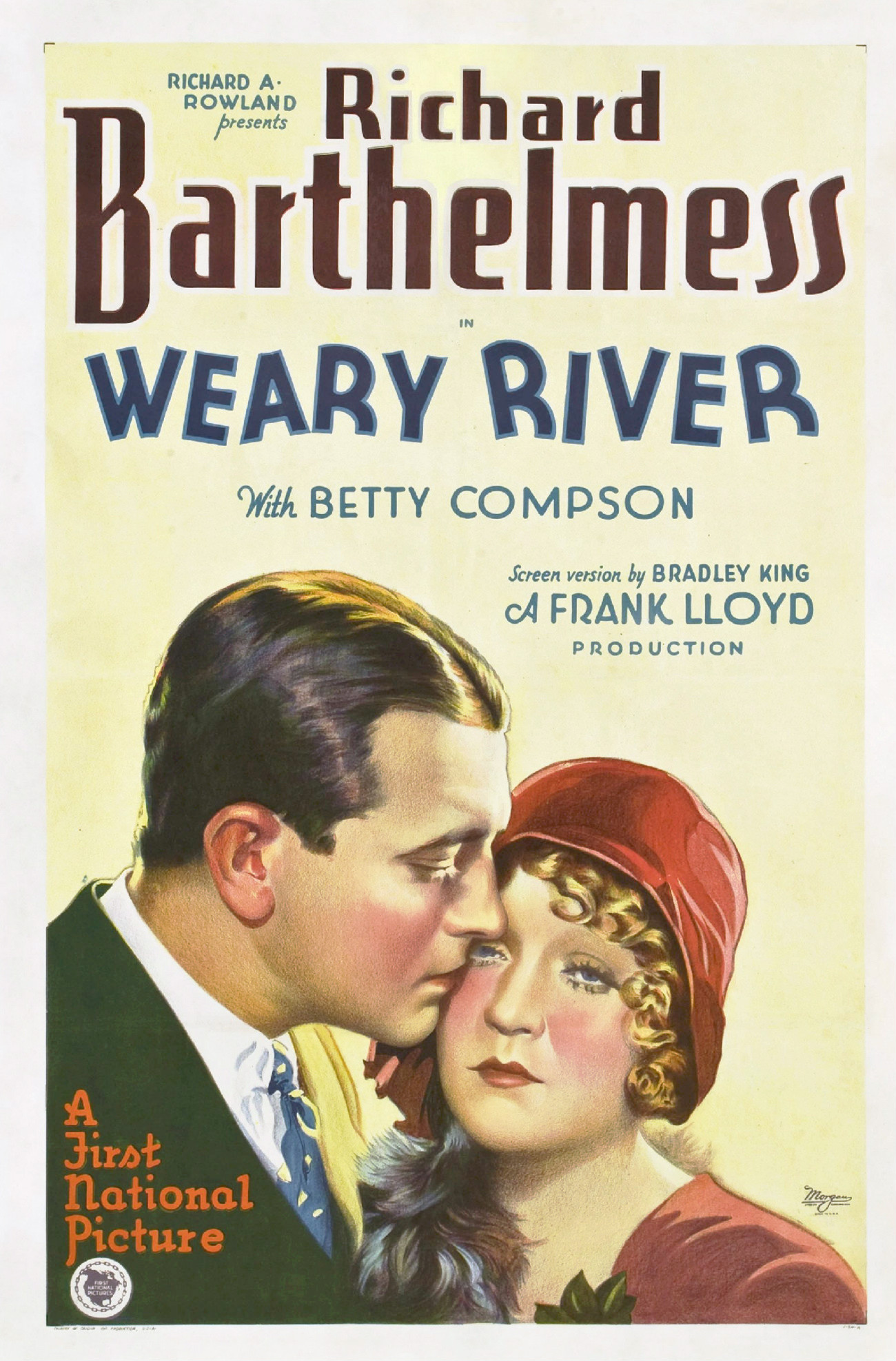
- Theatrical release poster
- Directed by: Frank Lloyd
- Written by: Paul Perez (titles); Thomas J. Geraghty (dialogue - uncredited)
- Screenplay by: Bradley King (screen version)
- Story by: Courtney Riley Cooper
- Produced by: Richard A. Rowland
- Starring: Richard Barthelmess; Betty Compson
- Cinematography: Ernie Haller; Alvin Knechtel (special photography)
- Edited by: Edward Schroeder; James Gibbon
- Production company: First National Pictures
- Distributed by: First National Pictures
- Release date: February 10, 1929 (US)
- Running time: 86 minutes (8 reels)
- Country: United States
- Languages: Sound (Part-Talkie); English Intertitles

Weary River is a 1929 American sound part-talkie romantic drama film directed by Frank Lloyd and starring Richard Barthelmess, Betty Compson, and William Holden (no relation to William Holden, star of such films as Sunset Boulevard). The film was produced and distributed by First National Pictures. In addition to sequences with audible dialogue or talking sequences, the film features a synchronized musical score, singing and sound effects along with English intertitles. The soundtrack was recorded using the Vitaphone sound-on-disc system.

Based on a story by Courtney Riley Cooper, the film is about a gangster who goes to prison and finds salvation through music while serving his time. After he is released and falls back into a life of temptation, he is saved by the love of a woman and the warden who befriended him. The film received a nomination for an Academy Award for Best Director in 1930.

Weary River was preserved at the Library of Congress and restored by the LoC, UCLA Film and Television Archive, and Warner Bros. Pictures. It is available on DVD directly from the Warner Archive Collection.

While Barthelmess's character sings and plays the piano throughout the film, Barthelmess did not sing or play the piano. Frank Churchill played the piano, and Johnny Murray sang into a microphone far away from Barthelmess while he lip-synced and played a piano that had strings deadened with felt.

== Plot ==
Jerry Larrabee is framed by rival gangster Spadoni and sent to prison, where he is befriended by a kind and understanding warden. Through the warden's patient influence, Jerry becomes interested in music and forms a prison band, broadcasting over the radio. Jerry's singing deeply moves his radio listeners, and soon Jerry is given a pardon by the governor.

Jerry pursues a singing career in vaudeville, billing himself as the Master of Melody, but constant whispers of "Convict!" from the audience disturb his concentration. Moving from job to job, Jerry is haunted by his past. With no hope of succeeding in music, Jerry returns to his old gang and takes up with his former sweetheart Alice Gray. As he prepares for a final confrontation with Spadoni, Alice gets in touch with the warden, who arrives on the scene in time to keep Jerry on the straight and narrow path. Jerry eventually becomes a radio star and marries Alice.

== Cast ==
- Richard Barthelmess as Jerry Larrabee
- Betty Compson as Alice Gray
- William Holden as Warden
- Louis Natheaux as Spadoni
- George Stone as Blackie
- Raymond Turner as Elevator Boy
- Gladden James as Manager
- Robert Emmett O'Connor as Police Sergeant (uncredited)
- Johnny Murray as Jerry Larrabee's singing voice (uncredited)

== Songs ==
- "Weary River"- lyrics by Grant Clarke, music by Louis Silvers
- "It's Up To You"- lyrics by Grant Clarke, music by Louis Silvers

A cover of Weary River by Layton & Johnstone is sampled in frequently in The Caretaker's Everywhere at the End of Time, most prominently in the track "Q1 - Long decline is over"

== See also ==
- List of early sound feature films (1926–1929)
