= The Silver Horde (1920 film) =

1920 film by Frank Lloyd

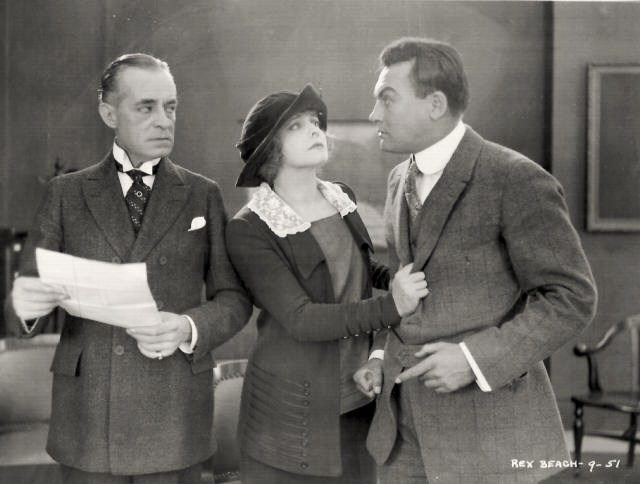
- Still with l to r: Sidney Ainsworth, Myrtle Stedman, and Curtis Cooksey. (*Ainsworth is not credited with the main cast though he obviously has a substantial role. He possibly was a last minute cast change.)
- Directed by: Frank Lloyd
- Written by: J. E. Nash; Laurence Trimble
- Based on: The Silver Horde; 1909 novel by Rex Beach
- Produced by: Rex Beach; Samuel Goldwyn
- Starring: Myrtle Stedman; Curtis Cooksey; Betty Blythe
- Cinematography: William C. Foster
- Production company: Eminent Authors Pictures
- Distributed by: Goldwyn Distributing Company
- Release date: May 9, 1920
- Running time: 80 minutes
- Country: United States
- Language: Silent (English intertitles)

The Silver Horde is a 1920 American silent adventure-drama film directed by Frank Lloyd and starring Myrtle Stedman, Curtis Cooksey, and Betty Blythe. It is based on the 1909 novel The Silver Horde by Rex Beach.

== Plot ==
A young man goes to Alaska to establish a salmon business.

== Cast ==
- Myrtle Stedman as Cherry Malotté
- Curtis Cooksey as Boyd Emerson
- Betty Blythe as Mildred Wayland
- R.D. MacLean as Wayne Wayland
- Robert McKim as Marsh
- Hector V. Sarno as Constantine
- Louis Durham as Swanson
- Maurice 'Lefty' Flynn as Thug
- Neola May as Snowbird
- Ervin Denecke as Thug
- Fred R. Stanton as Big George Bolt
- Carl Gerard as Alton Clyde
- Murdock MacQuarrie as Richard Jones

== Preservation status ==
- This film is listed as surviving and preserved by MGM.

== Bibliography ==
- Goble, Alan. The Complete Index to Literary Sources in Film. Walter de Gruyter, 1999.
