= Ernest Haller =

American cinematographer (1896–1970)

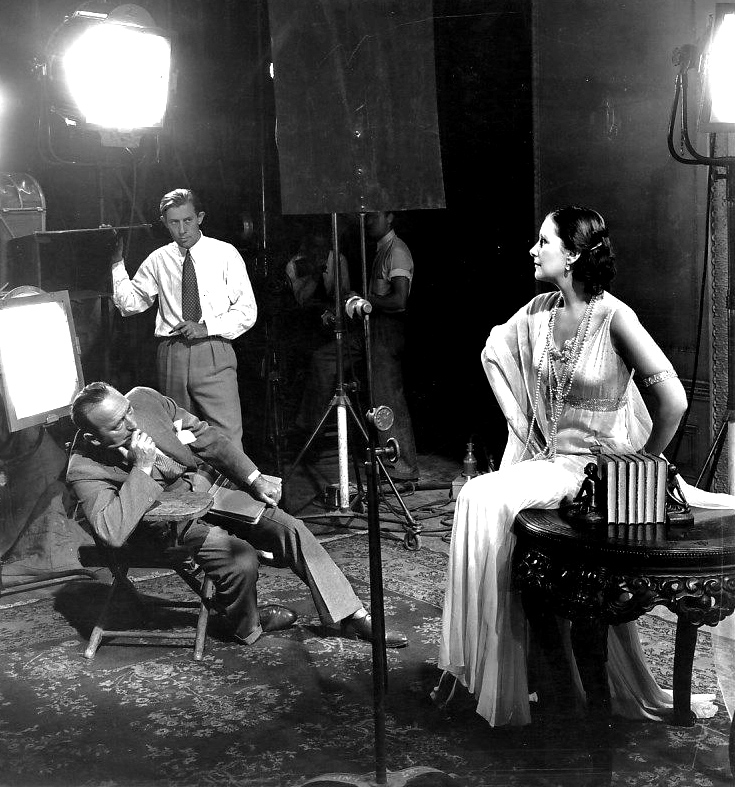
- Ernest Haller stands at the camera as director Michael Curtiz prepares to test German actress Lil Dagover for her first American film, The Woman from Monte Carlo (1932)
- Born: May 31, 1896; Los Angeles, California, U.S.
- Died: October 21, 1970 (aged 74); Marina del Rey, California, U.S.
- Occupations: Cinematographer, actor
- Years active: 1920–1965

Ernest Jacob Haller ASC (May 31, 1896 – October 21, 1970), sometimes known as Ernie J. Haller, was an American cinematographer.

He was most notable for his involvement in Gone with the Wind (1939), and his close professional relationships with prominent actresses of the time, such as Bette Davis, Joan Crawford, and Ingrid Bergman.

Haller was nominated for the Academy Award for Best Cinematography seven times for Jezebel, All This, and Heaven Too, Mildred Pierce, The Flame and The Arrow, What Ever Happened to Baby Jane? and Lilies of the Field; winning once for Gone with the Wind.

He was killed in a car accident in Marina Del Rey, California on October 21, 1970, at the age of 74, and was buried at Freedom Mausoleum, Forest Lawn, Glendale, California.

== Early life and education ==
Ernest Haller was born in Los Angeles, California on May 31, 1896. He went to Hollywood High School and graduated after four years. With his photographic training and a year of laboratory experience, Haller dove straight into the film industry after graduating. His initial interest was in acting; although none of his parents or other relatives were theatrical people, he managed to pursue acting both on stage and screen.

== Career ==
In 1914 with his older brother's help, Haller first joined the American Mutoscope and Biograph Company, also known as the Biograph Studio or Biograph, as an actor. However, he realized his true passion fairly quickly, for he switched to the camera department within a year of joining the studio. At the time, Biograph's prized director was D.W. Griffith, and Haller began as an assistant cameraman to Griffith's great cameraman Billy Bitzer.

His first job as a cameraman was The Hazards of Helen (1914), which was an early adventure serial film that was released by the Kalem Company. When D.W. Griffith left Biograph due to a disagreement between him and the studio regarding his feature film Judith of Bethulia (1914), the company gradually met its end. Eventually, the Biograph was bought by the First National Pictures, and First National was later bought by Warner Brothers. When Warner Brothers took over the First National, a number of the company's finest cameramen including Haller followed.

Upon the launch of his career as a cinematographer, Haller worked vigorously in every department of silent film, photographing approximately 50 films in the next decade. The first motion picture that he was officially credited as a cinematographer was Mothers of Men in 1920. Some of Haller's recognized works after that include Weary River (1928), Dawn Patrol (1930), The Rich Are Always with Us (1932)— a film where he first photographed Bette Davis—, The Emperor Jones (1933), and Dangerous (1935). In 1938, Haller received his first Academy Awards nomination for Best Cinematography for the film Jezebel. This recognition caught the eye of David O. Selznick who was impressed with Haller's work in Jezebel enough to borrow him from Warner Bros. to participate in Gone with the Wind (1939), which garnered Haller his first and only Oscar for Best Cinematography. A year later, Haller received his third nomination for All This, and Heaven Too (1940), then his fourth for Mildred Pierce (1945), and his fifth for The Flame and the Arrow (1950).

With the coming of independent cinema, Haller and many other cameramen decide to continue their careers as freelancers. Jim Thorpe— All American (1951) was his last film, Haller left Warner Bros. after 26 years. After little work on films as a freelancer, Haller returned to Warner Bros. as an independent contractor for Rebel Without a Cause (1955). With this as a start, he continued to work on a few films for Warner Bros. including What Ever Happened to Baby Jane? (1962), which earned him his sixth nomination. His seventh and final nomination was only a year later with his work on Lilies of the Field (1963).

Haller initially announced his retirement in 1965 but briefly came out of it in July 1965 upon the request of director James Goldstone to film the second pilot of the Star Trek episode "Where No Man Has Gone Before". With this as his final credit, Haller retired from the motion pictures industry.

== Legacy ==
=== Jezebel and Bette Davis ===
Haller's relationship with Bette Davis was ardent and long-lasting. They met on the film The Rich Are Always with Us (1932), and frequently worked together. He was the director of photography when she won her first Oscar for Dangerous (1935). With Jezebel, Haller was nominated alongside her. Davis was extremely fond of Haller and his style, “Ernest Haller had always been my favorite cameraman. I never told him what to do, but I put my trust in him to do what he knew how to do, to make me look my best.” His work on Jezebel led to his involvement in Gone with the Wind.

=== Gone with the Wind ===
Producer, David O. Selznick, was impressed with Haller's work on Jezebel, replacing the former cinematographer Lee Garmes, who left the production after a month over creative differences. Haller's work earned him his first and only Academy Award along with the Technicolor Associates Ray Rennahan and Wilfred M. Cline. Gone with the Wind (1939) was a success, also winning awards for Best Picture, Best Director, Best Actress and Supporting Actress.

=== Mildred Pierce and Joan Crawford ===
Working closely with Bette Davis and earning two nominations for photographing her in Jezebel and All This, and Heaven Too, Haller also developed a strong relationship with Joan Crawford. He received his fourth nomination for Mildred Pierce, and Crawford won the award for Best Actress. Haller continued to photograph Crawford in several other films, including Humoresque (1946) and both actresses in What Ever Happened to Baby Jane? (1962).

=== What Ever Happened to Baby Jane? ===
Although Haller terminated his contract with Warner Bros. in 1951, he was the best choice to photograph Bette Davis and Joan Crawford— two of the closest actresses that Haller has worked with and the ex-Warner stars. He was brought back to photograph the only film the two would appear in together. In What Ever Happened to Baby Jane?, Davis made the decision to embrace the unflattering qualities of the character while Crawford remained with her glamour.

== Awards and nominations ==
Best Cinematography

- Jezebel (1938) - nominated
- Gone with the Wind (1939) - won
- All This, and Heaven Too (1940) - nominated
- Mildred Pierce (1945) - nominated
- The Flame and the Arrow (1950) - nominated
- What Ever Happened to Baby Jane? (1962) - nominated
- Lilies of the Field (1963) - nominated

== Selective filmography ==
- Mothers of Men (1920)
- For Love or Money (1920)
- Trumpet Island (1920)
- Why Women Sin (1920)
- Yes or No? (1920)
- The Iron Trail (1921)
- Outcast (1922)
- Homeward Bound (1923)
- Parisian Nights (1924)
- High and Handsome (1925)
- Three Keys (1925)
- The Reckless Lady (1926)
- The Wilderness Woman (1926)
- Prince of Tempters (1926)
- Dance Magic (1927)
- The Whip Woman (1928)
- Wheel of Chance (1928)
- Weary River (1928)
- Young Nowheres (1929)
- Wedding Rings (1929)
- Son of the Gods (1929)
- Millie (1931)
- Chances (1931)
- Street of Women (1932)
- The Emperor Jones (1933)
- Easy to Love (1934)
- Captain Blood (1935)
- Dangerous (1935)
- That Certain Woman (1937)
- Jezebel (1938)
- Brother Rat (1938)
- Dark Victory (1939)
- The Roaring Twenties (1939)
- Gone with the Wind (1939)
- All This, and Heaven Too (1940)
- Honeymoon for Three (1941)
- The Bride Came C.O.D. (1941)
- The Maltese Falcon (1941)
- George Washington Slept Here (1942)
- Mr. Skeffington (1944)
- Mildred Pierce (1945)
- Devotion (1946)
- Deception (1946)
- Humoresque (1946)
- Winter Meeting (1948)
- The Flame and the Arrow (1950)
- Jim Thorpe - All-American (1950)
- Jhansi Ki Rani (1953)
- Circus of Love (1954)
- Magic Fire (1955)
- Rebel Without a Cause (1955)
- Strange Intruder (1956)
- God's Little Acre (1958)
- Man of the West (1958)
- The Miracle (1959)
- The Boy and the Pirates (1960)
- Armored Command (1961)
- Fear No More (1961)
- What Ever Happened to Baby Jane? (1962)
- Lilies of the Field (1963)
- Dead Ringer (1964)

== Bibliography and further reading ==
- Chandler, Charlotte (2006). The Girl Who Walked Home Alone: Bette Davis, A Personal Biography. New York: Simon & Schuster. ISBN 978-1-84739-698-3
- Finler, Joel W. (1988). The Hollywood Story. London: Wallflower Press. ISBN 1-903364-66-3
- Keating, Patrick (2014). Cinematography. Rutgers: The State University. ISBN 978-0-8135-6349-7
- Keating, Patrick (2010). Hollywood Lighting from the Silent Era to Film Noir. New York: Columbia University Press. ISBN 978-0-231-14902-0
- Nichols, Bill (1985). Movies and Methods: An Anthology Vol. 2. Los Angeles: University of California Press. ISBN 0-520-05408-3
- Wilson, Steve (2014). The Making of Gone with the Wind. Austin: University of Texas Press. ISBN 978-0-292-76126-1
