= Riders of the Purple Sage (1918 film) =

1918 film

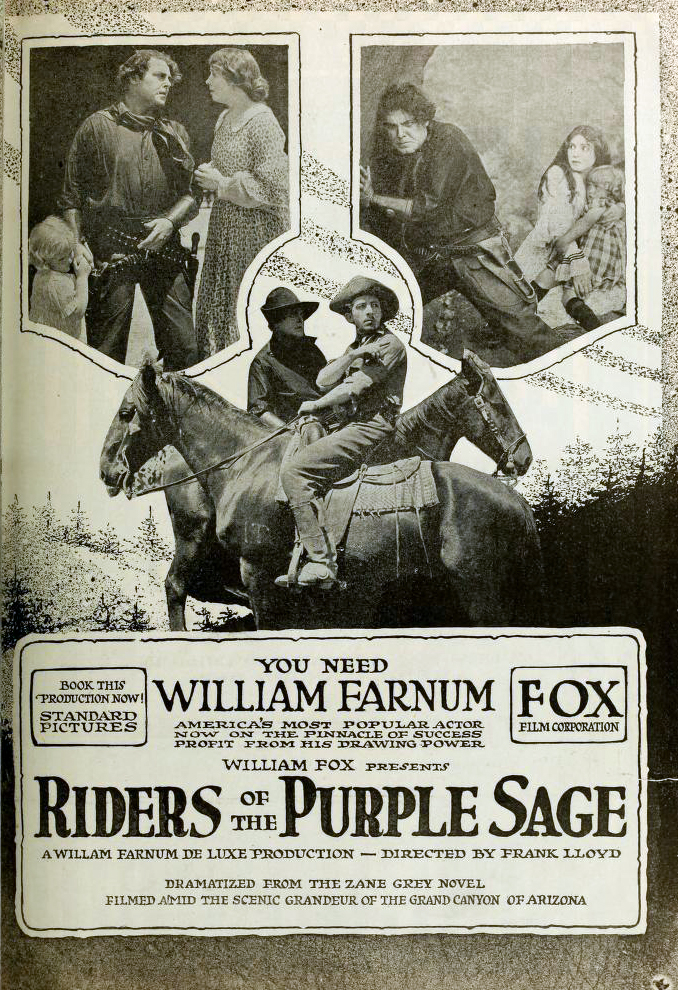
- Advertisement (1918)
- Directed by: Frank Lloyd
- Written by: Frank Lloyd
- Starring: William Farnum; Mary Mersch; William Scott
- Production company: Fox Film Corporation
- Distributed by: Fox Film Corporation
- Release date: 1918
- Running time: 115 minutes
- Country: United States
- Languages: Silent; English intertitles

Riders of the Purple Sage is a 1918 American silent Western film directed by Frank Lloyd and starring William Farnum, Mary Mersch, and William Scott. The film is about a former Texas Ranger who goes after a group of Mormons who have abducted his married sister. This Frank Lloyd silent film was the first of five film adaptations of Zane Grey's 1912 novel.

== Plot ==
Former Texas Ranger Lassiter leaves Texas and travels to Arizona sage country pursuing a group of Mormons who abducted his married sister. He arrives at the Withersteen ranch near the Utah border, where his sister was last seen. He meets the Withersteens and their beautiful daughter, Jane. Lassiter rescues her rider, Venters, from torture at the hands of a villain named Tull. Soon, Lassiter falls in love with Jane, but when she learns about his mission, she is reluctant to help him, fearing more violence will come to the region. Her feelings for him change, however, when she sees the hardened gunfighter befriend her ward, a young orphan girl named Fay Larkin.

While Venters is out searching for the rustlers who have been raiding the Withersteens' ranch and stealing their cattle, he wounds and captures the rustlers' masked leader, who turns out to be a beautiful young woman. Rather than turning her over to the law, Venters brings her to a secluded valley, where the two fall in love.

Meanwhile, Lassiter learns that his sister is dead, and that the man who abducted her, Dyer, is also responsible for much of the trouble faced by Jane and her family. Lassiter tracks the villain and raids a Mormon meeting, killing Dyer. The angry Mormons then pursue Lassiter, Jane, and Fay to the secluded valley where they meet Venters and the repentant cattle thief, whom Lassiter recognizes as his dead sister's daughter, Millie. Venters and the girl escape the Mormons, but Lassiter, in rolling a huge boulder down on his pursuers, blocks the only exit to the valley, trapping himself, Jane, and Fay inside the valley forever.

== Cast ==
- William Farnum as Lassiter
- Mary Mersch as Jane
- William Scott as Venters
- Marc Robbins as Dyer
- Murdock MacQuarrie as Tull
- Kathryn Adams as Masked Rider / Millie
- Nancy Caswell as Fay Larkin
- J. Holmes as Jerry Carol
- Buck Jones in a bit part (uncredited)
- Jack Nelson in a bit part (uncredited)

== Production ==
Riders of the Purple Sage features uncredited bit parts by future silent film stars Buck Jones and Jack Nelson.

== Reception ==
Riders of the Purple Sage received mixed reviews upon its theatrical release in 1918. The reviewer for Motion Picture News wrote:

Fast physical action, beautiful desert scenery, plenty of horses and horse riding, some thrills and suspense, including a few situations with heart interest, constitute the entertaining elements of this attraction. This picture will appeal to those who like the Western type of photoplay.

The reviewer for Variety called the film a "not-too-absorbing adaptation of the novel", noting that the film "does not rise above the level of the average Western photoplay of this type and there is no special distinction in direction or photography."

In her review for Allmovie, Janiss Garza wrote that despite the "rousing climax", the film was "not one of the better adaptations of the Zane Grey novel."

Like many American films of the time, Riders of the Purple Sage was subject to restrictions and cuts by city and state film censorship boards. For example, the Chicago Board of Censors required a cut, in Reel 3, of the man falling after Lassiter shoots, Reel 6, the intertitle "He made me — I can't tell you — I can't —", the shooting of Oldring, and, Reel 7, last shooting scene in which a Mormon is killed.

== Reissues ==
The film was reissued on April 3, 1921.

== See also ==
- Riders of the Purple Sage
- 1937 Fox vault fire
