= To the Last Man =

To the Last Man may refer to:

== Comics ==
- To the Last Man, a 2014 story arc (issues 19–21) of Abe Sapien. A film poster of the 1933 western appears in #20.

== Novels ==
- To the Last Man (Grey novel), a 1921 Western novel by Zane Grey
- To the Last Man (Shaara novel), a 2004 historical novel by Jeff Shaara

== Films ==
- To the Last Man (1923 film), American silent western based on Grey's 1921 novel; directed by Victor Fleming
- To the Last Man (1933 film), another American version of Grey's novel; directed by Henry Hathaway

== Television ==
- Gunsmoke: To the Last Man, a 1992 TV movie based on the TV series Gunsmoke
- "To the Last Man" (Torchwood), an episode of Torchwood

== See also ==
- The Last Man (disambiguation)
