= Tonto Basin, Arizona =

CDP in Gila County, Arizona

- Census-designated place
- Location in Gila County and the state of Arizona

- Location in the United States
- Coordinates: 33°50′24″N 111°17′5″W
- Country: United States
- State: Arizona
- County: Gila

Area
  - Total: 32.12 sq mi (83.20 km^{2})
  - Land: 32.12 sq mi (83.19 km^{2})
  - Water: 0.0039 sq mi (0.01 km^{2})
- Elevation: 2,238 ft (682 m)

Population (2020)
  - Total: 1,444
  - Density: 45.0/sq mi (17.36/km^{2})
- Time zone: UTC-7 (MST (no DST))
- ZIP code: 85553
- Area code: 928
- FIPS code: 04-74610
- GNIS feature ID: 1853170

Tonto Basin is a census-designated place (CDP) in Gila County, Arizona, United States. The population was 1,424 at the 2010 United States census, up from 840 in 2000.

Within Tonto Basin is located in the unincorporated community of Punkin Center.

== History ==
The Pleasant Valley War (also sometimes called the Tonto Basin War or Feud) was an 1886 Arizona range war between two feuding families, the cattle-herding Grahams and the sheep-herding Tewksburys.

== Geography ==
Tonto Basin is located in western Gila County at 33°50′24″N 111°17′5″W (33.839953, -111.284734), in the valley of Tonto Creek, a south-flowing tributary of the Salt River. Arizona State Route 188 passes through the community, leading southeast 49 miles (79 km) to Globe, the county seat, and north 30 miles (48 km) to Payson.

According to the United States Census Bureau, the Tonto Basin CDP has a total area of 31.3 square miles (81.1 km^{2}), all land.

== Demographics ==
Historical population
Census	Pop.	Note	%±
2020	1,444		—
U.S. Decennial Census

=== 2020 census ===
As of the 2020 census, Tonto Basin had a population of 1,444. The median age was 65.9 years. 7.8% of residents were under the age of 18 and 53.1% of residents were 65 years of age or older. For every 100 females there were 109.9 males, and for every 100 females age 18 and over there were 114.1 males age 18 and over.

0.0% of residents lived in urban areas, while 100.0% lived in rural areas.

There were 800 households in Tonto Basin, of which 6.9% had children under the age of 18 living in them. Of all households, 46.9% were married-couple households, 31.4% were households with a male householder and no spouse or partner present, and 18.0% were households with a female householder and no spouse or partner present. About 41.6% of all households were made up of individuals and 29.9% had someone living alone who was 65 years of age or older.

There were 1,258 housing units, of which 36.4% were vacant. The homeowner vacancy rate was 2.6% and the rental vacancy rate was 9.6%.

Racial composition as of the 2020 census
Race	Number	Percent
White	1,330	92.1%
Black or African American	12	0.8%
American Indian and Alaska Native	6	0.4%
Asian	3	0.2%
Native Hawaiian and Other Pacific Islander	0	0.0%
Some other race	15	1.0%
Two or more races	78	5.4%
Hispanic or Latino (of any race)	69	4.8%

=== 2000 census ===
As of the census of 2000, there were 840 people, 439 households, and 262 families residing in the CDP. The population density was 26.8 inhabitants per square mile (10.3/km^{2}). There were 726 housing units at an average density of 23.1 per square mile (8.9/km^{2}). The racial makeup of the CDP was 96.1% White, 1.4% Native American, 0.9% from other races, and 1.6% from two or more races. 2.0% of the population were Hispanic or Latino of any race.

There were 439 households, out of which 9.1% had children under the age of 18 living with them, 51.0% were married couples living together, 7.1% had a female householder with no husband present, and 40.3% were non-families. 33.9% of all households were made up of individuals, and 16.9% had someone living alone who was 65 years of age or older. The average household size was 1.91 and the average family size was 2.38.

In the CDP, the population was spread out, with 10.4% under the age of 18, 3.6% from 18 to 24, 13.5% from 25 to 44, 39.9% from 45 to 64, and 32.7% who were 65 years of age or older. The median age was 58 years. For every 100 females, there were 107.4 males. For every 100 females age 18 and over, there were 103.0 males.

The median income for a household in the CDP was $23,398, and the median income for a family was $29,091. Males had a median income of $30,125 versus $17,500 for females. The per capita income for the CDP was $15,157. About 15.9% of families and 18.3% of the population were below the poverty line, including 16.9% of those under age 18 and 12.3% of those age 65 or over.

== Notable person ==
- Frederick Russell Burnham participated on the losing side in the Tonto Basin Feud of 1886 and narrowly escaped alive. After the feud, he went home to California and left for Africa only a few years later.

== In popular culture ==
- Tonto Basin is a 1921 Western novel by Zane Grey about a feud between two families.
- To the Last Man (1923 film) is a silent film based on the Zane Grey novel Tonto Basin. The film was also shot on location at Tonto Basin, Arizona.
- Tonto Basin Outlaws is a 1941 film based very loosely on the Tonto Basin Feud. Cowboys are out to stop a cattle-rustling scandal soon after they enlist with Teddy Roosevelt's Rough Riders. In the real-life feud, one man did go on to join the Rough Riders.
- To the Last Man (film) is a 1933 Henry Hathaway film based on the Zane Grey novel starring Randolph Scott, Esther Ralston, Buster Crabbe, Barton MacLane, Noah Beery, Shirley Temple, and Eugenie Besserer.
- According to an NPR story on the Lone Ranger, Tonto Basin is the inspiration for Tonto, the Native American companion to the Lone Ranger.

== See also ==
- Battle of Turret Peak
- Battle of Salt River Canyon
