= At Last (disambiguation) =

"At Last" is a 1941 song by Harry Warren and Mack Gordon first popularized by Glenn Miller and later made a standard by Etta James.

At Last may also refer to:

== Film and TV ==
- At Last (film), a 2005 film starring Brooke Adams
- At Last the 1948 Show, a British satirical television show
- "At Last", alternate title of the Phineas and Ferb episode "Phineas and Ferb Get Busted!"

== Music ==
- At Last (band), a band that was a finalist in the first season of America's Got Talent

=== Albums ===
- At Last!, an album by Etta James
- At Last (Cyndi Lauper album)
- At Last (Etta Jones album)
- At Last (Lynda Carter album)
- At Last (Lou Rawls album)
- At Last...The Duets Album, an album by Kenny G
- At Last, an album by Gladys Knight
- At Last (Alex Faith album)

== See also ==
- At Least, At Last, a rarities box set by The Posies
- Free at Last (disambiguation)
- Last (disambiguation)
