= Last Man Standing =

Last Man Standing may refer to:

== Film ==
- Last Man Standing (1987 film), a film directed by Damian Lee
- Last Man Standing (1995 film), a film starring Jeff Wincott
- Last Man Standing (1996 film), a film starring Bruce Willis
- Undisputed II: Last Man Standing, a 2006 sequel to the action film Undisputed

== Literature ==
- Last Man Standing (novel), a novel by David Baldacci
- Last Man Standing: Killbook of a Bounty Hunter, a graphic novel series
- Last Man Standing, a biography of Jamie Dimon, by Duff McDonald
- Last Man Standing: Mort Sahl and the Birth of Modern Comedy, a biography of Mort Sahl by James Curtis

== Music ==
=== Albums ===
- Last Man Standing (E-type album), 1998
- Last Man Standing (Jerry Lee Lewis album), 2006
  - Last Man Standing Live, by Jerry Lee Lewis
- Last Man Standing (MC Eiht album), 1997
- Last Man Standing (Ryan Shupe & The RubberBand album)
- Last Man Standing (Willie Nelson album), 2018
- Last Man Standing, by Mr. Capone-E
- Last Man Standing, by RBL Posse member Black C

=== Songs ===
- "Last Man Standing" (Pop Evil song), 2010
- "Last Man Standing" (Some & Any song), 2009
- "Last Man Standing" (Bruce Springsteen song), 2020
- "Last Man Standing", by Alter Bridge from Pawns & Kings
- "Last Man Standing", by Asher Roth & Akon from the Madden NFL 12 video game soundtrack
- "Last Man Standing", by Bon Jovi from Have a Nice Day
- "Last Man Standing", by Duran Duran from Red Carpet Massacre
- "Last Man Standing", by Eric Martin for Pride FC
- "Last Man Standing", by HammerFall from Steel Meets Steel: Ten Years of Glory
- "Last Man Standing", by Hybrid from I Choose Noise
- "Last Man Standing", by Kompany and Virus Syndicate from Metropolis
- "Last Man Standing", by People in Planes from Beyond the Horizon
- "Last Man Standing", by Satyricon from The Age of Nero
- "Last Man Standing", by Victoria Justice, 2023

== Television ==
- Last Man Standing (Australian TV series), a 2005 drama series
- Last Man Standing (British TV series), a 2007–2008 reality series
- Last Man Standing (American TV series), a 2011–2017, 2018-2021 sitcom starring Tim Allen and Nancy Travis
- Making the Cut: Last Man Standing, a Canadian reality television series featuring ice hockey
- Last Man Standing: Politics, Texas Style, a 2004 documentary film aired as an installment of the TV series POV

=== Episodes ===
- "Last Man Standing" (1 vs. 100)
- "Last Man Standing" (The Biggest Loser Asia)
- "Last Man Standing" (Casualty)
- "The Last Man Standing" (Cosby)
- "Last Man Standing" (Desire)
- "Last Man Standing" (Dr. Stone)
- "Last Man Standing" (I'm Alive)
- "Last Man Standing" (Jake 2.0)
- "Last Man Standing" (Love Games: Bad Girls Need Love Too)
- "Last Man Standing" (NCIS)
- "Last Man Standing" (NY Ink)
- "Last Man Standing" (The Naked Archaeologist)
- "Last Man Standing" (The Net)
- "Last Man Standing" (A Scare at Bedtime)
- "Last Man Standing" (She Spies)
- "Last Man Standing" (Solved)
- "Last Man Standing", an episode of City Homicide

== Video games ==
- Last man standing (video games), a gametype featured in several computer and video games
- Last Man Standing Coop, a Doom 3 cooperative-play modification

== Other ==
- Last Man Standing (motorcycle race), an annual event in Bulcher, Texas, US
- Last Man Standing match, a type of specialty match in professional wrestling

== See also ==
- The Last Women Standing, 2015 romantic drama film
- Last One Standing (disambiguation)
- The Last Man (disambiguation)
