= TLO =

TLO is a bus company group in Finland.

TLO may also refer to:

- Talodi language, by ISO 639-3 code
- Technology Licensing Office, another term for university technology transfer offices
- T. L. O., an unnamed high school student involved in the U.S. Supreme Court case New Jersey v. T. L. O.
- Total Loss Only, a type of maritime insurance policy
- TLO, company acquired by TransUnion
- The Last One, software published in 1981 that took input from a user and generated a program in BASIC
