= Katelyn Barr =

American voice actress

- Born: North Carolina, U.S.
- Occupations: Voice actress; ADR script writer
- Years active: 2014–present
- Website: www.katelyn-barr.com

Katelyn Barr is an American voice actress and ADR script writer known for her work on video games and English dubs of anime.

== Biography ==
Originally from North Carolina, Barr wanted to be an actor, and had an interest in anime, from a young age. Participating in theater classes and plays since middle school, she studied Theater in college. Barr moved to Houston with her husband. After taking workshops and networking, she got an audition at Sentai Filmworks and obtained her first credited role in Log Horizon.

As a script writer, she has written for the English dubs of Wizard Barristers, Scarlet Nexus and The Case Study of Vanitas.

== Filmography ==
=== Animated series ===
List of voice performances in animated series
Year	Title	Role	Notes	Ref.
2015	Nobunaga the Fool	Chacha		
2015	Magical Warfare	Ena		
2015	Hamatora	Misty		
2015	Chaika: The Coffin Princess	Layla		
2016	Wizard Barristers	Aki, Kaede		
2016	When Supernatural Battles Became Commonplace	Fan		
2016	Aoharu x Machinegun	Michiru		
2017	Amagi Brilliant Park	Aisu Kyubu		
2017	Utawarerumono: The False Faces	Honoka		
2017	Food Wars!: Shokugeki no Soma	Aki		
2017	Chihayafuru	Mari		
2017	Haven't You Heard? I'm Sakamoto	Yagi		
2017	Anime-Gataris	Maya		
2017	Black Clover	Dominante Code, Eliza		
2017	The Ancient Magus' Bride	Fumiki		
2017	Star Blazers: Space Battleship Yamato 2199	Melda		
2018	Katana Maidens: Toji No Miko	Yukari		
2018	Tokyo Ghoul:re	Hsiao		
2018	Anonymous Noise	Momo (young)		
2018	Hanebado!	Miyako Taromaru		
2018	Mr. Tonegawa: Middle Management Blues	Nurse Big Eyes		
2018	Scum's Wish	Ayumi, Young Mugi		
2018	UQ Holder!	Tatsumiya, Yuna		
2018	A Certain Magical Index	Rimea	Season 3	
2018	Magical Girl Raising Project	La Pucelle		
2019	Date A Live	Natsumi	Seasons 3–5	
2019	Magical Girl Spec-Ops Asuka	Tamara Volkova		
2019	My Girlfriend Is Shobitch	Akiho		
2019	Love Stage!!	Maho, Young Ryoma		
2019	Kono Oto Tomare! Sounds of Life	Hisako Midoriyama		
2019	Cutie Honey Universe	Naoko		
2019	Kämpfer	Shizuku Sangō, Penguin		
2019	Fruits Basket	Ritsu Soma (Young), Ren Sōma		
2019	Arifureta	Noint		
2019	Knights of the Zodiac: Saint Seiya	Ophiuchus Shaina		
2019	Kemono Friends	Scarlet Ibis		
2019	Cautious Hero: The Hero Is Overpowered but Overly Cautious	Valkyrie		
2019	Golden Time	Sao-Chan		
2020	To Love Ru	Yami / Golden Darkness, Tearju		
2020	BanG Dream!	Hina Hikawa	Season 2	
2020	Kakushigoto	Ami		
2020	Warlords of Sigrdrifa	Claudia Bradford		
2020	Our Last Crusade or the Rise of a New World	Emperor Yunmelngen		
2021	Blade of the Immortal	Hyakurin		
2021	Dr. Stone	Niki Hanada		
2021	Kandagawa Jet Girls	Jennifer Peach, Risa Aoi		
2021	Mars Red	Tenmanya		
2021	The Case Study of Vanitas	Nox		
2021	The World Ends with You: The Animation	Eri's Friend		
2021	The Dungeon of Black Company	RIM		
2021	Mother of the Goddess' Dormitory	Kiriya		
2021	Otherside Picnic	Kankandara		
2021	Kakegurui	Rei Batsubami	Sentai Filmworks dub	
2021	Rumble Garanndoll	Mimi		
2022	Aharen-san Is Indecipherable	Ms. Tobaru		
2022	Girls' Frontline	AGENT		
2022	Blue Reflection Ray	niina		
2022	Laid-Back Camp	Chiaki Ogaki		
2022	Call of the Night	Ko Yamori (young)		
2022	Chainsaw Man	Himeno		
2022	Spy × Family	Millie		
2023	PuraOre! Pride of Orange	Maya Walker		
2023	Akiba Maid War	Zoya		
2023	Trigun Stampede	Luida	Also Trigun Stargaze	
2023	Peter Grill and the Philosopher's Time	Gobuko Ngière		
2023	Urusei Yatsura	"Movie Wife"		
2023	A Galaxy Next Door	Shiori		
2023	Dead Mount Death Play	Yomogi		
2023	Farming Life in Another World	Lea	Season 1-2	
2023	Saint Cecilia and Pastor Lawrence	Lawrence (young)		
2023	The Duke of Death and His Maid	Daleth	Season 2	
2023	The Dangers in My Heart	Anna Yamada		
2023	The Eminence in Shadow	Mary		
2023	The Dreaming Boy Is a Realist	Fuka Sasaki		
2023	A Returner's Magic Should Be Special	Brigitte		
2023	I'm in Love with the Villainess	Manaria Sousse		
2023	Shy	Beni Hanawa		
2023	The Apothecary Diaries	Lishu's Former Head Lady-in-Waiting		
2023	Dark Gathering	Castle H Spirit		
2024	Metallic Rouge	Opera		
2024	The Witch and the Beast	Phanora Kristoffel		
2024	Kaiju No. 8	Mina Ashiro, Mina (child)		
2024	Fairy Tail: 100 Years Quest	Mimi		
2024	Trillion Game	Kirika		
2025	Medaka Kuroiwa is Impervious to My Charms	Tomo Namba		
2025	How I Attended an All-Guy's Mixer	Fuji		
2025	Plus-Sized Elf	Gonda		
2025	Lazarus	Inga		
2025	Beheneko: The Elf-Girl’s Cat is Secretly an S-Ranked Monster!	Feri		
2025	2.5 Dimensional Seduction	Eli		
2025	I'm Living with an Otaku NEET Kunoichi!?	Kanna		
2025	Rock Is a Lady's Modesty	Yayoi Takayanagi		
2025	Bad Girl	Kiyoraka Sumiki		
2025	My Gift Lvl 9999 Unlimited Gacha	Dewy		
2025	Dusk Beyond the End of the World	Haniyama		
2026	Hana-Kimi	Mizuki Ashiya	Season 1-2	
2026	Chained Soldier	Homare		
2026	Daemons of the Shadow Realm	Whisper		
2026	The Angel Next Door Spoils Me Rotten	Sayo		
2026	Psyren	Fubiki		
2026	As a Reincarnated Aristocrat, I'll Use My Appraisal Skill to Rise in the World	Mireille		

=== Film ===
List of voice performances in film
Year	Title	Role	Notes	Ref.
2018	My Hero Academia: Two Heroes	Cow Lady		
2019	Human Lost	Shizuko		
2021	Majestic Prince: Genetic Awakening	Dioluna		
2021	Girls und Panzer das Finale	Erika		
2021	My Hero Academia: World Heroes' Mission	Ryukyu / Ryuko Tatsuma		
2023	Re:cycle of Penguindrum	Young Tabuki		
2024	Spy × Family Code: White	Millie		
2025	Ultraman 4K Discovery	Akiko Fuji		

=== Video games ===
List of voice performances in video games
Year	Title	Role	Notes	Ref.
2019	Borderlands 3	DJ Spinmouth, Gaddy, Goddess Statue		
2022	Made in Abyss: Binary Star Falling into Darkness	Main Character		
2023	Labyrinth of Galleria: The Moon Society	Cecilia, Birdperson		
2023	Double Dragon Gaiden: Rise of the Dragons	Linda		
2025	Zenless Zone Zero	Yidhari Murphy		
2026	School Days Remastered	Kotonoha Katsura		
