= The Last One =

The Last One may refer to:

== Television ==
- "The Last One", an episode of Aqua Teen Hunger Force
- "Last Last One Forever and Ever", an episode of Aqua Teen Hunger Force
- "The Last One Forever and Ever (For Real This Time) (We ... Mean It)", an episode of Aqua Teen Hunger Force
- "The Last One" (St. Elsewhere), the 1988 final episode of St. Elsewhere
- "The Last One" (Friends), the final episode of Friends
- The Last One, a documentary by Neal Hutchenson featuring moonshine maker Marvin "Popcorn" Sutton

== Other meanings ==
- The Last One (software), a computer program from the early 1980s which aimed to allow non-programmers to create application software
- The Last One (album), a 2024 album by Headie One
- The Last One , a Vertigo mini-series by J. M. DeMatteis
- "The Last One", a song by Black Veil Brides from Vale, 2017
- "The Last One", a song by Cary Brothers from Who You Are, 2007
- "The Last One", a song by Hieroglyphics, from 3rd Eye Vision, 1998
- "The Last One", a song by Maisie Peters from The Good Witch (Deluxe), 2023
- The Last One, a 2016 novel by Alexandra Oliva

== See also ==
- Last One on Earth, 1992 album
- The Last Woman (French: La Dernière femme; Italian: L'ultima donna), 1976 French-Italian film
- Last One Standing (disambiguation)
- The Last Man (disambiguation)
- The Last (disambiguation)
- Last (disambiguation)
