= Last of the month =

Recurring terminal calendar date position

The last of the month or last day of the month is the recurring calendar date position corresponding to the final day of any given month. In the Gregorian calendar (and other calendars that number days sequentially within a month), the last day varies depending on the month and, in the case of February, whether the year is a leap year.

In the Gregorian calendar, the last day of the month may fall on:

- January 31
- February 28 (common years)
- February 29 (leap years)
- March 31
- April 30
- May 31
- June 30
- July 31
- August 31
- September 30
- October 31
- November 30
- December 31

In addition to these dates, this date occurs in months of many other calendars, such as the Bengali calendar and the Hebrew calendar.

== See also ==
- Last (disambiguation)
- Twenty-eighth of the month
- Twenty-ninth of the month
- Thirty-first of the month
- Thirtieth of the month
- End of the Month, a film
