= George Morton Randall =

United States Army general (1841–1918)

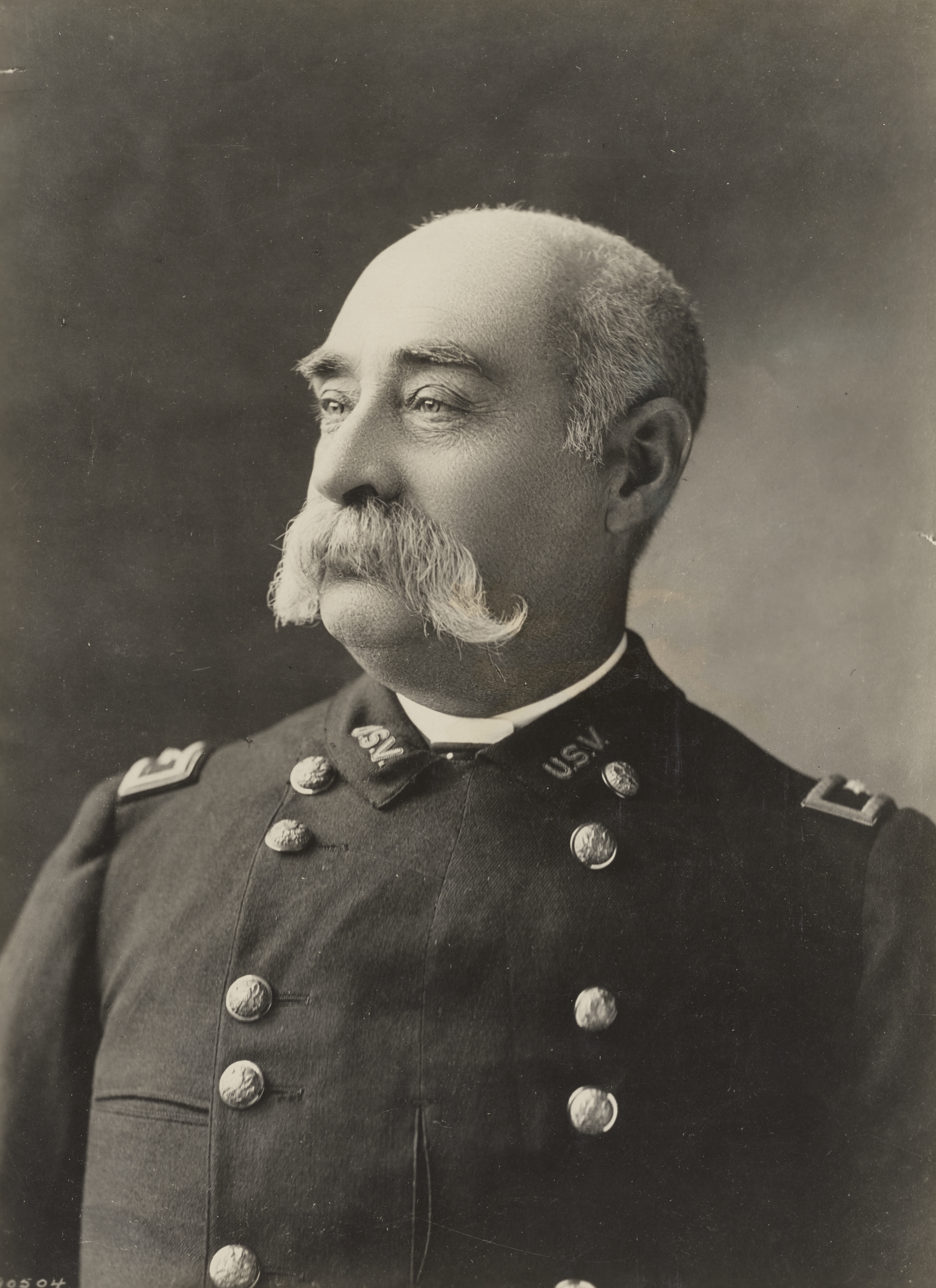
- Randall as a Brigadier General of Volunteers c. 1900–1901
- Born: October 8, 1841; Conneaut, Ohio
- Died: June 14, 1918 (aged 76); Denver, Colorado
- Relatives: Henry M. Black (father-in-law)
- Military career
- Allegiance: United States of America
- Branch: United States Army
- Service years: 1861–1905
- Rank: Major General
- Units: 4th Pennsylvania Infantry Regiment; 14th New York Heavy Artillery; 8th Infantry Regiment; 23rd Infantry Regiment; 17th Infantry Regiment; Department of Alaska; Department of Luzon
- Conflicts: American Civil War: Battle of Gaines' Mill; Battle of Malvern Hill; Second Bull Run; Battle of Fredericksburg; Battle of the Wilderness; Battle of Antietam; Battle of the Crater; Battle of Fort Stedman; Indian Wars: Battle of Turret Peak; Powder River Expedition; Diamond Butte

George Morton Randall (October 8, 1841 – June 14, 1918) was a major general in the United States Army, noted for his service in the American Civil War and Indian Wars. He was born in Conneaut, Ohio, the son of Brewster Randall (1807–1880) and Harriet Eliza Fifield Randall (1819–1878).

== Civil War ==
Randall enlisted as a private in the 4th Pennsylvania Volunteer Infantry in the April 1861. He then accepted appointment to the 4th U.S. Infantry as second lieutenant in October. He served in New York and Washington, D.C., and in the field with the Army of the Potomac. He was a second lieutenant at the Siege of Yorktown, Battle of Gaines' Mill, Battle of Malvern Hill, Second Bull Run (where he commanded Company C), and Fredericksburg; and a first lieutenant at the Battle of the Wilderness. He was appointed a brevet captain for gallant service in the Battle of Antietam. He served as a major in the 14th New York Heavy Artillery Regiment, part of Major General Ambrose Burnside's IX Corps on the Richmond-Petersburg Front in 1864, and was commander of the regiment at the Battle of the Crater. The Dansville Advertiser reported on 7 September that he assumed command of the regiment on 18 August. This article also reports that he was wounded in the battle on 19 August. He was appointed a brevet lieutenant colonel, and then colonel for gallantry in the Battle of Fort Stedman. He mustered out of the Volunteer service on 26 August, and was appointed captain in the 4th US Infantry on 23 September 1865. Subsequently, he served at Davids' Island Military Reservation, New York Harbor, where he was in December 1867.

== Indian Wars ==
He was assigned to the 23rd Infantry on 31 December 1870, and served with them in the West for more than 20 years. In 1873 he served under General George Crook in Arizona during the Tonto Basin campaign. On March 27, 1873, he led a small force that attacked a group of Yavapai Indians in the Battle of Turret Peak.

On April 25, he led a force that surrounded the camp of Tonto Apache chief Delshay on upper Canyon Creek. Delshay surrendered when the troops started firing, the last of the Apache war chiefs to surrender and move to a reservation.

He also served with General Crook in the 1876 Powder River Expedition during the Black Hills War. From 1879 to 1880, Randall commanded Fort Reno in Oklahoma. He was promoted to major on 15 January 1891, and returned to the 4th Infantry Regiment. He was promoted to lieutenant colonel of the 8th Infantry on 1 March 1894, then colonel of the 17th US Infantry in the Spanish–American War on 8 August 1898. A month later he transferred back to the 8th US Infantry.

== Alaska and the Philippines ==
In January 1900, in response to large numbers of immigrants flooding into the Alaskan Territory in search of gold, President William McKinley assigned Randall, now a colonel, to command an army division there. He received commission as brigadier general of Volunteers on 20 January 1900. He was the first commander of Fort St. Michael, and submitted a recommendation calling for a telegraph line between the various Alaskan posts. He was appointed brigadier general, USA, on 6 February 1901. In his Annual Report for the Department of Alaska, he noted that "the Eskimo has been unnoticed by those he has befriended and has been allowed to die for the lack of proper care and food." He later served at New York and Knoxville, Tennessee, and commanded at Vancouver, Washington, prior to commanding the Department of Luzon in the Philippines from 1903 to 1905. After further duty in St. Louis, Missouri, General Randall retired on 8 October 1905, and died on 14 June 1918 in Denver, Colorado. He is buried in the Oak Hill Cemetery in Janesville, Rock County, Wisconsin (Block 20, lot 9, grave 6).

During his long service, he was awarded six brevets: captain (17 September 1862) for Antietam; major (2 April 1865) for Petersburg; lieutenant colonel and colonel of Volunteers (26 March 1865) for the attack on Fort Stedman; lieutenant colonel (27 February 1890) for actions against Indians at Turret Mountain, Arizona on 27 March 1873 and Diamond Butte, Arizona, on 22 April 1873; and colonel (27 February 1890) for "action against Indians near Pinal, Arizona 8 March 1874" and "distinguished service during the campaign against Indians in Arizona.

== Namesake ==
USS General George M. Randall (AP-115) was named for him. He is also a Prominent Companion of the Military Order of the Loyal Legion of the United States.

General Randall is not to be confused with the Rt. Rev. George Maxwell Randall (1810–1873), Protestant Episcopal Bishop of Colorado, one of the founders of the Colorado School of Mines.
