= The Last Man on Earth =

(The) Last Man on Earth may refer to:

- Last Man on Earth (book), science fiction anthology edited by Isaac Asimov
- Last Man on Earth (album), a 2001 album by Loudon Wainwright III
- "The Last Man on Earth" (song), a 2021 song by Wolf Alice from their album Blue Weekend
- The Last Man on Earth (1924 film), a silent comedy film
- The Last Man on Earth (1964 film), an Italian science fiction film starring Vincent Price
- The Last Man on Earth (2011 film), an Italian science fiction film by Gipi
- The Last Man on Earth (TV series), a 2015 American comedy television series

== See also ==
- The Last Man on Planet Earth, a 1999 television movie
- Y: The Last Man, a science fiction comic book series
- Last Woman on Earth, 1960 science fiction film
- Last One on Earth, 1992 album
- The Last Man (disambiguation)
