= The Last =

The Last may refer to:

- The Last (band), Los Angeles power pop band active since 1976
- The Last (audio drama), a Doctor Who audio drama released in 2004
- The Last (album), 2009 album by Aventura
- "The Last", a song by Childish Gambino from the 2010 mixtape Culdesac
- "The Last", a song by Denzel Curry from the 2022 album Melt My Eyez See Your Future
- "The Last", a song by The Replacements from the 1990 album All Shook Down
- The Last: Naruto the Movie, 2014 Japanese animated film from the Naruto franchise
- The Last (film), 2019 movie

== See also ==
- Last (disambiguation)
- The Last One (disambiguation)
- The Last Man (disambiguation)
