= Tonto Basin =

Landform in Gila County, Arizona

Coordinates: 33.8317111°N 111.294575°W

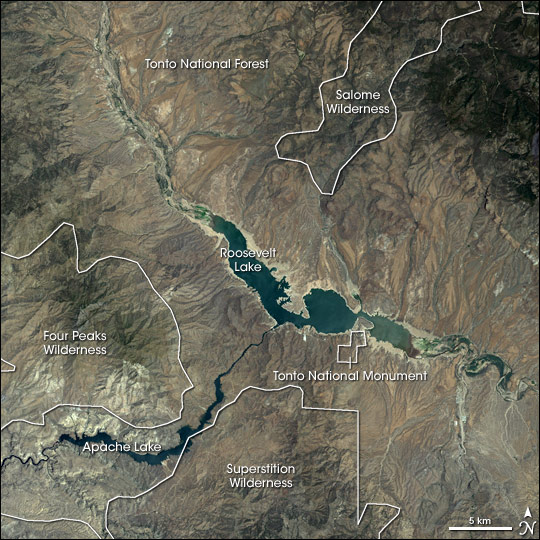
Satellite image.

The Tonto Basin, also known as Pleasant Valley, covers the main drainage basin of Tonto Creek and its tributaries in central Arizona, at the southwest of the Mogollon Rim, the higher elevation transition zone across central and eastern Arizona. Although the word tonto means silly or foolish in Spanish, this place name is derived from the Apache word, Koun’nde, which means wild, rough people and refers to the indigenous Dilzhe’e Tonto Apache.

Tonto Basin is mostly north-south trending and outflows into the Salt River at the extensive canyon reservoir called Theodore Roosevelt Lake.

Arizona Route 188 traverses the lower Tonto Basin on the southwest side of Theodore Roosevelt Lake; it then merges at the water divide northeast of the Mazatzals, with State route 87 which proceeds to Payson and further to Kohls Ranch and Christopher Creek at the basin headwaters at the foot of the Mogollon Rim.

== Regional geography ==
The Tonto Basin is Y-shaped at its headwaters. East are the Sierra Ancha range, part of the Mogollon Rim, and Tonto Creek draining from the northeast. West lies the Mazatzal Mountains and a ridgeline of hills on the north, the Limestone Hills on the south-side of the East Verde River; this is the water divide at the west of the Y-shape, a much shorter drainage basin, dwarfing the major upper Tonto Creek drainage.

== See also ==
- Tonto Basin (novel)
- Tonto Basin, Arizona
- Pleasant Valley War
- Yavapai Wars
