= Battle of Turret Peak =

Part of the Yavapai and Apache Wars (1873)

- Part of the Yavapai War, Apache Wars
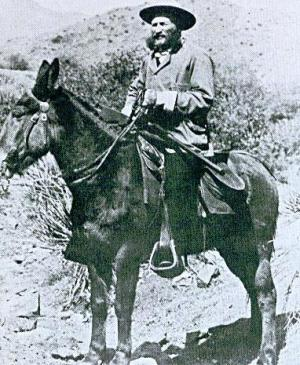
- George Crook during the Tonto Basin Campaign.
Date	March 27, 1873
Location	Tonto Basin, Arizona Territory 34°14′53″N 111°51′53″W
Result	United States victory

Belligerents
United States	Yavapai; Apache

Commanders and leaders
(United States) George Crook (United States) George M. Randall	Delshay

Casualties and losses
None	57 killed

The Battle of Turret Peak occurred March 27, 1873 in the Arizona Territory between the United States Army and a group of Yavapai and Tonto Apaches as part of Lieutenant Colonel George Crook's campaign to return the natives to reservations.

== Background ==
In June 1871, George Crook was assigned to the Southwest to help quell skirmishes between settlers and members of the Yavapai and Apache tribes in central Arizona Territory. He organized the Tonto Basin Campaign to track down members of the tribes and return them to the reservations. Over the course of the operation, there were over twenty clashes, including an attack in December 1872 on a Yavapai camp known as the Skeleton Cave massacre.

On March 11, 1873, a band of Tonto Apaches attacked and killed three white men. Crook's men tracked the attackers to a Yavapai stronghold on Turret Peak in central Arizona.

== Battle ==
On March 27, 1873, a group of soldiers and Apache Scouts under the command of Captain George M. Randall crept up Turret Peak around midnight. Randall had the men crawl on hands and knees to avoid making any noise or rattling any stones. Waiting until dawn, the soldiers charged and surprised a rancheria near the crest of the mountain. The natives were so startled and panic-stricken that many of them simply jumped from the mountain side falling to their death below. Some resisted, fighting for a little while before being killed or surrendering. Fifty-seven natives died as result and several more were wounded and captured. Unfortunately a few civilians were found in the cave after the fighting had stopped, killed accidentally by the covering fire or rolling rocks. The attack at Turret Peak proved demoralizing to the Yavapai and Tonto (Apache) people. Two weeks after the battle, on April 6, many of the hostiles surrendered to Crook at Camp Verde. Several of the soldiers who fought at Turret Peak were later awarded the Medal of Honor for their actions.

Yavapai historian Maurice Crandall writes that the event was "another historic massacre of Yavapai peoples", and describes it thus:

In another surprise attack at dawn on March 27, 1873, just three months after the Skeleton Cave Massacre, Crook's soldiers massacred a large number of Yavapais at a place called Atasquaselhúa ("Sycamore with yellow leaves in fall"). Called Bloody Basin or Turret Mountain by whites, many of our people jumped off the cliffs of the butte to their deaths in the melee, while others were shot.
