= Last One Standing =

Last One Standing or Last Ones Standing may refer to:

== Film and television ==
- Last One Standing (Hong Kong TV series), a Hong Kong serial drama
- Last Man Standing (British TV series), broadcast in the U.S. as Last One Standing
- Last One Standing (Japanese TV series), Japanese thriller-comedy series for Netflix
- "Last One Standing" (Battle for Dream Island), a 2025 episode of the animated series

== Music ==
=== Albums ===
- The Last One Standing, by Christine Fellows (2002)
- Last One Standing (album), by I Divide (2014)
- Last One Standing, by Aryn Michelle (2011)
- Last One's Standing, by Ceann (2010)

=== Songs ===
- "Last One Standing" (Girl Thing song) (2000)
- "Last One Standing" (Emerson Drive song) (2004)
- "Last One Standing" (Skylar Grey, Polo G, Mozzy, and Eminem song) (2021)
- "Last One Standing", by Avalon Drive (2008)
- "Last One Standing", by Cheryl from A Million Lights (2012)
- "Last One Standing", by Neil Finn from Try Whistling This (1999)
- "Last One Standing", by Nick Lachey (2011)
- "The Last One Standing", by Ladytron from Witching Hour (2005)
- "Last One Standing", by ¡Mayday! from Believers (2013)
- "Last One Standing", by Silent Civilian from Ghost Stories (2010)
- "Last One Standing", by Simple Plan from Get Your Heart On! (2011)
- "Last Ones Standing", by Example (2010)

== Sports ==
- Backyard ultra, an ultramarathon format also known as Last One Standing

== See also ==
- "Last One Standing for You", a 1994 song by The Black Sorrows and Jon Stevens
- The Last Women Standing, a 2015 romantic drama film
- Last Man Standing (disambiguation)
- The Last One (disambiguation)
