= 6th California Infantry Regiment =

6th California Volunteer Infantry
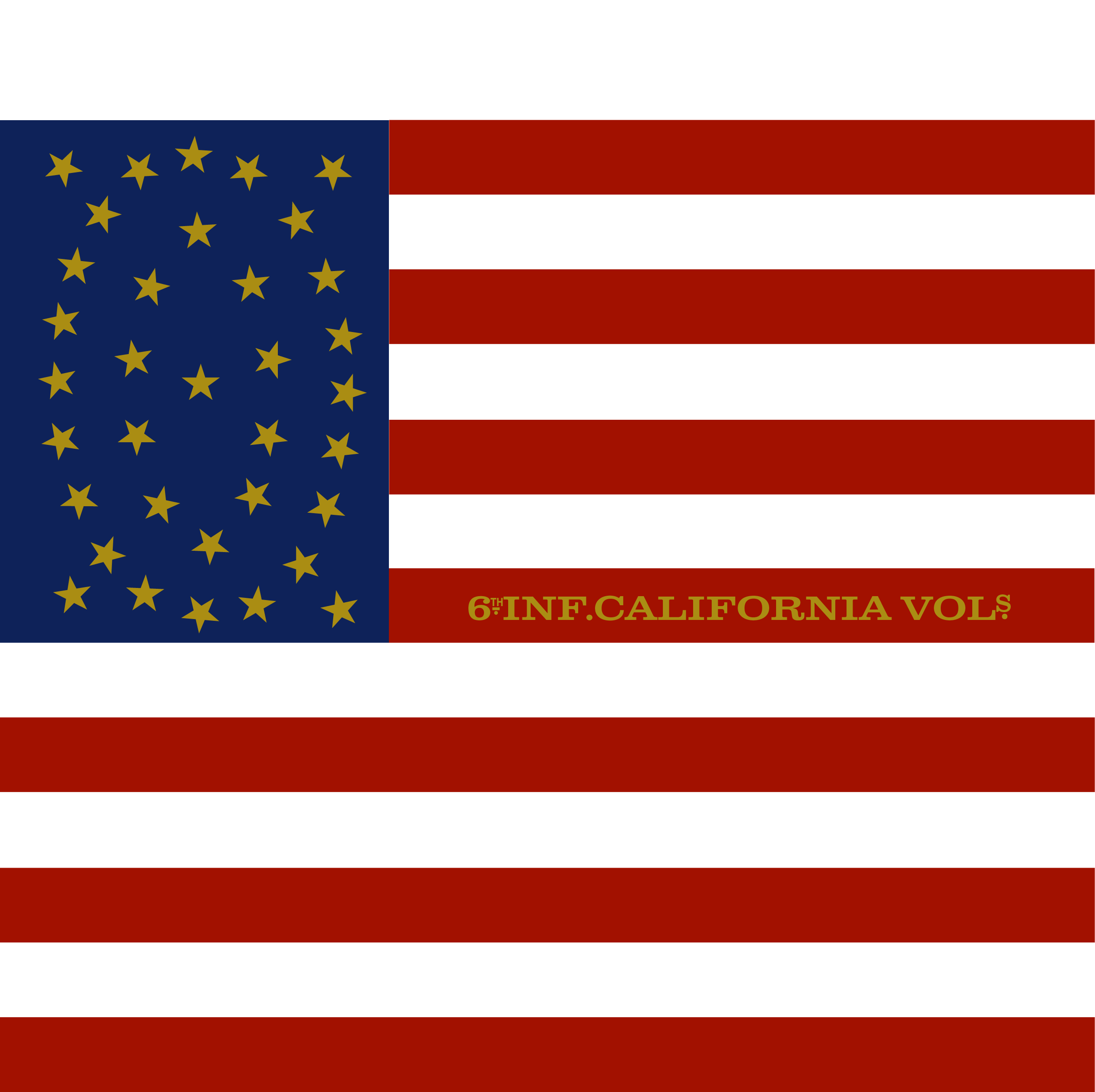
- National color of the regiment
- Active: March 14, 1863, to December 20, 1865
- Country: United States
- Allegiance: Union
- Branch: Infantry
- Engagements: American Civil War: Bald Hills War

The 6th Regiment California Volunteer Infantry was an infantry regiment in the Union Army during the American Civil War. It spent its entire term of service in the western United States attached to the Department of the Pacific.

== History ==
The Regiment was organized at Benicia Barracks, San Francisco on February 1, 1863. 6th Regiment mustered out from October 25 to December 20, 1865. The only recorded engagements of the Regiment occurred with the detachment sent to the Humboldt Military District in 1864, near the end of the Bald Hills War.

== Commanders ==
- Colonel Henry M. Black February 1, 1863 - June 30, 1864.

== Company assignments ==
- Headquarters: Mustered in March 14, 1863. Mustered out
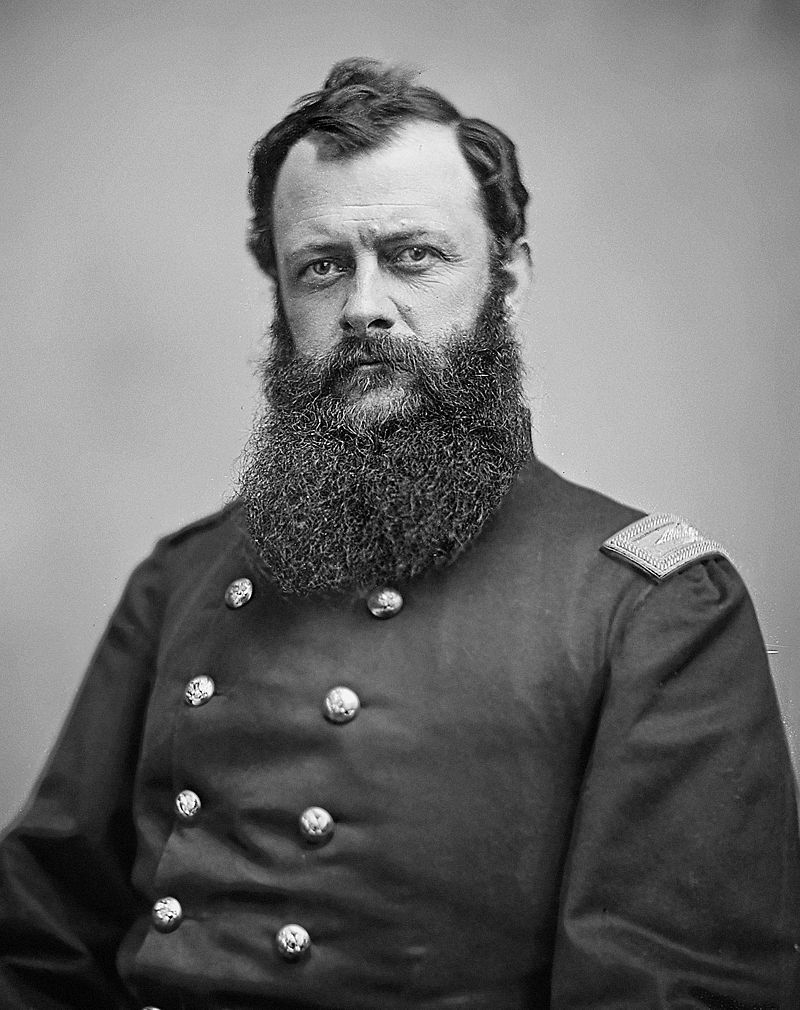
  Colonel Henry M. Black
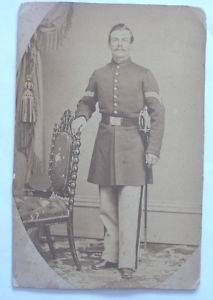
  George Perkins, Company H
  October 31, 1865.
- Company A: Raised in Washington Territory it was mustered in on October 21, 1862, as a company of U. S. Volunteers, unattached, by Captain Winder, Third U. S. Artillery, at Alcatraz Island, Cal. On November 17, 1862, it was assigned to the Presidio, San Francisco. On February 9, 1863, the company was redesignated as Company A, 6th Regiment of Infantry, California Volunteers and assigned to Benicia Barracks. Ordered to Camp Bidwell, near Chico, California, August 20, 1863. The company was transferred to Alcatraz Island May 30, and remained there until mustered out October 31, 1865.
- Company B: Mustered in on May 11, 1864. Duty at Benicia Barracks until mustered out October 25, 1865.
- Company C: Mustered in on October 20, 1863. Left Benicia Barracks February 15, 1864, and arrived at Fort Humboldt on February 17, 1864. Same day ordered to scout after Indians. Returned to Arcata, February 27, 1864.
  - March 1, 1864, ordered to Camp at Boynton's Prairie.
    - Scout from Boynton's Prairie, March–July 8, 1864 Company on scout from this camp until July 8, 1864.
      - Skirmish near Boynton's Prairie May 6.
  - Company C was ordered to Camp Jaqua arriving July 8, 1864.
    - Scout from Camp Jaqua, July 10 to October 30, 1864. Forty Indians killed and captured on scout from Camp Jaqua.
  - October 10, 1864, the company left Camp Jaqua for Fort Humboldt. Arrived October 11, 1864.
  - May 8, 1865, left Fort Humboldt for Camp Lincoln, and arrived May 10, 1865. Distance marched by the company during eight months' active campaigning against the Indians amounted to nearly two thousand miles. The company was on duty at Camp Lincoln, Humboldt County, until it was ordered to the Presidio, San Francisco, and mustered out December 15, 1865.
- Company D: Mustered in on September 12, 1864, in San Francisco. It was stationed at Benicia Barracks until June, 1865 when it went to Nevada, and was stationed for a short time at Camp McDermit, Queens River. While in Nevada Captain Hill was dismissed from duty after ordering his men killed an Indian child. It was mustered out at the Presidio, San Francisco, December 20, 1865.
- Company E: Mustered in on July 11, 1863, and stationed at Benicia Barracks. On February 15, 1864, it was ordered to Fort Humboldt, where it arrived on February 17, 1864. From that time until October 10, 1864, it was constantly in the field operating against hostile Indians in the District of Humboldt.
  - Skirmish at Booth's Run, May 1. Skirmished with Indians at Booth's Run.
  - Skirmish at Kneeland's Prairie, May 2.
  - Skirmish at Grouse Creek, May 23. With Company "G" skirmished with Indians at Grouse Creek

Left Fort Humboldt for Benicia, October 16, 1864, and arrived October 20, 1864. Mustered out October 31, 1865, at Benicia Barracks.

- Company F: Muster in, August 17, 1864, and was stationed at Benicia Barracks, until mustered out, October 25, 1865.
- Company G: Muster in at Benicia Barracks, February 2, 1864. It left February 15, 1864, by steamer, arriving at Fort Humboldt on February 17. Left Fort Humboldt and arrived at camp near Arcata February 28. March 2 left camp near Arcata, and arrived at camp near Fort Gaston on March 5.
  - Left for Stephens' Camp on the 9th, scouted the South Fork of Trinity River, and returned to camp near Fort Gaston on the 17th.
  - Left camp for Martin's Ferry, on the Klamath River, on the 22nd, and arrived there the same day. Left on the 24th for a scout down the Klamath River, and returned to Martins Ferry on the 28th, and on the 30th returned to camp near Fort Gaston. Estimated distance marched, two hundred and ninety miles in rain and snow most of the time.
  - April 13, 1864, the company left camp near Fort Gaston, and arrived at Camp Iaqua, on the 18th.
  - Scout to Fort Baker, April 22–26, 1864. Left Camp Jaqua for Fort Baker on the 22nd on a one hundred and fifty mile scout returning on the 26th.
  - Scout to Brown' Ranch, May 1–8, 1864. A detachment of the company left camp for the vicinity of Brown's Ranch, on a scout, and returned on the 3rd. Left on the 4th for the same place; returned on the 8th.
  - Scout on Mad River, May 6–9, 1864. Second detachment left on the 6th to scout on Mad River; returned on the 9th.
  - Scout to Redwoods, May 10–20, 1864. First detachment left on the 10th for Redwoods, and returned on the 20th. Second detachment left again on the 12th for Pilot Creek; returned on the 20th.
  - Scout to Fort Baker, May 16–18, 1864. A small detachment left on the 16th for Fort Baker; returned on the 18th.
  - Fight at Grouse Creek, May 23, 1864. Company left for Rabbit Creek on the 21st, and (with Company "G") had a fight with the Indians, at Grouse Creek May 23, killing twelve and taking four prisoners, returned on the 25th. Estimated distance marched, including company and detachments, four hundred and eighty miles.
  - Scout to Fort Baker, June 5–29, 1864. A detachment left Camp Jaqua on June 5 for the Mad River, and returned on the 15th. Left again on the 25th for Redwoods and Fresh Water Slough; returned on the 29th.

Captain Cook, with Company G, left Camp Jaqua on July 11, 1864, for Fort Humboldt, arriving on the 12th. Company left Fort Humboldt October 18, 1864, marched two hundred and forty-five miles to Benicia Barracks October 20, 1864, and duty there until January 24, 1865. The company left Benicia Barracks, marched one hundred and sixty-five miles to Monterey Barracks via San Jose and San Juan and arrived February 17, 1865. Company G was mustered out of service at the Presidio Barracks, San Francisco, October 31, 1865.

- Company H: Mustered in at Benicia Barracks, March 4, 1864. It was stationed at that post during the whole of its term of service. During the later part of the war it provided guard detachments on Pacific Mail steamships. It was mustered out October 25, 1865.
- Company I: Mustered in at Benicia Barracks, September 2, 1864, where it remained on duty until June 3, 1865. It started for Nevada, arriving at Fort Churchill June 14, 1865; it was at Camp Black, Paradise Valley, during July and August, 1865; in the field during September, and finally mustered out at the Presidio, San Francisco, December 20, 1865.
- Company K: Mustered in at San Francisco, February 3, 1864. This company was stationed at Benicia Barracks until September, 1864; it was then on duty in San Francisco as Provost Guard until July, 1865. During this time it provided guard detachments on Pacific Mail steamships. Then it was at Benicia Barracks until its final muster out at that post October 25, 1865.

== See also ==
- List of California Civil War Union units
