= Henry M. Black =

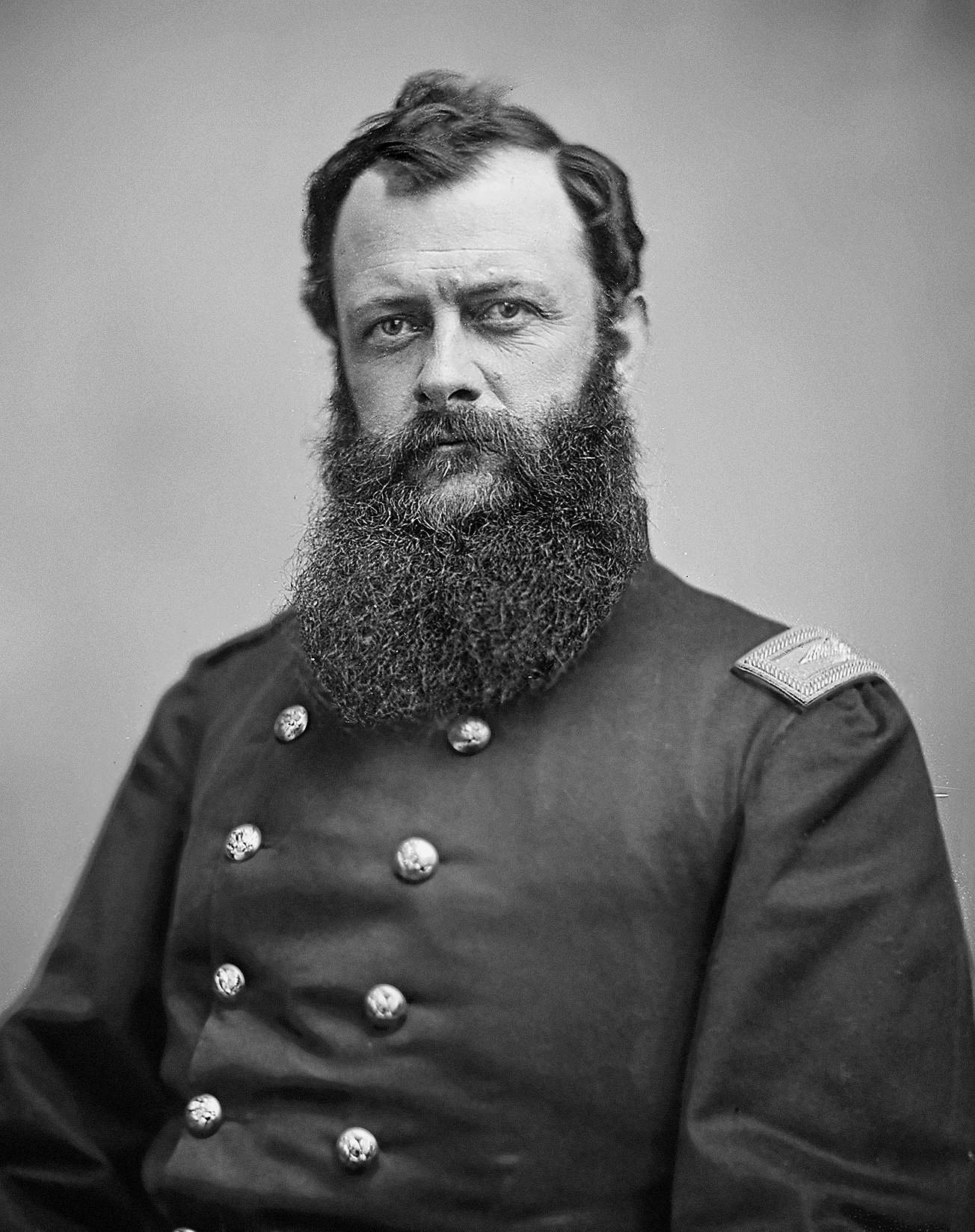
- Henry M. Black
- Born: January 15, 1827; Delaware County, Pennsylvania
- Died: August 5, 1893 (aged 66); Chicago, Illinois
- Burial place: West Point Cemetery
- Relatives: George Morton Randall (son-in-law)
- Military career
- Allegiance: United States of America; Union
- Branch: United States Army; Union Army
- Service years: 1847–1891
- Rank: Colonel
- Commands: Humboldt Military District; 6th California Infantry; Commandant of Cadets (United States) 23rd U.S. Infantry
- Conflicts: Mexican–American War; American Civil War; American Indian Wars

Henry Moorehouse (or Moore) Black (Note: Contemporary sources report his middle name as Moorehouse. Other sources have shortened it to Moore.) (January 15, 1827 – August 5, 1893) was a United States Army officer who served as Commandant of Cadets at the United States Military Academy.

== Early career ==
Born in Delaware County, Pennsylvania, in 1827, Henry Black was appointed to the United States Military Academy from Pennsylvania on July 1, 1842. He graduated and was appointed brevet second lieutenant in the 4th U.S. Infantry on July 1, 1847. He was commissioned a full second lieutenant in the 7th U.S. Infantry, August 20, 1847, and served with that regiment in the Mexican War at Mexico City.

From 1848 to 1855, Black served with the 7th Infantry at Jefferson Barracks, in Florida, and at Fort Gibson. He was promoted to first lieutenant in the 9th U.S. Infantry on March 3, 1855, and served with them at Fort Monroe and on recruiting duty. He was then promoted to captain in the 9th Infantry on September 10, 1856. From 1857 to 1861, he served with that regiment at Fort Simcoe and Fort Dalles, engaging in scouts against the Yakima and other Indians.

== Civil War ==
During the American Civil War Black was on the Pacific Coast from 1861 to 1864. In June 1861, he assumed command of the Army's Fort Vancouver, relieving future Union general John S. Mason. He was promoted to colonel in the Sixth California Infantry on February 1, 1863. In February 1864, he was sent to Fort Humboldt with three companies of reinforcements ("C," "E" and "G"), to take command of the Humboldt Military District.

In June 1864 he was sent to West Point to be Commandant of Cadets of the United States Military Academy and an instructor of tactics. He was mustered out of the Sixth California Infantry October 27, 1865; was promoted to major in the 7th U.S. Infantry on July 25, 1866; and promoted to lieutenant-colonel in the Fourth U.S. Infantry, on October 7, 1868.

== Later career ==
Following his assignment at West Point Black was assigned to 15th U.S. Infantry, on July 1, 1870. From then until 1891, he was on duty with his regiment at posts in the South and West. He conducted courts martial, and commanded troops in Maryland and West Virginia during the railroad troubles in 1877. He was made colonel in the 23rd U.S. Infantry, on February 6, 1882.

He commanded Fort Wayne, Michigan, until May, 1890. He then commanded Fort Sam Houston until January 15, 1891, when he retired from active service, at 64 years of age.

Black died of heart failure on August 5, 1893, at the home of his son-in-law George M. Randall in Chicago, Illinois, aged 66. He was interred at the West Point Cemetery on August 8, 1893.

== Notes ==
Military offices
Preceded by John C. Tidball	Commandants of Cadets of the United States Military Academy; 1864–1870	Succeeded by Emory Upton
