= The Last Man (disambiguation) =

The Last Man is an 1826 science fiction novel by Mary Shelley

The Last Man or Last Man may also refer to:

- Last man, a term used by Nietzsche to describe the antithesis of the Übermensch
- The Last Man (1932 film), an American film directed by Howard Higgin
- The Last Man (1934 film), a Czech comedy film directed by Martin Frič
- The Last Man (1955 film), a West German film
- The Last Man (2002 film), an American film directed by Harry Ralston
- The Last Man (2006 film), a Lebanese film
- The Last Man (2019 film), a Canadian film starring Hayden Christensen and Harvey Keitel
- "The Last Man" (Stargate Atlantis), an episode of Stargate Atlantis
- Last man (football), the last team member in a position to stop an obvious goal-scoring opportunity
- Lastman (comic book), a French comics series
- The Last Man (Playhouse 90), an American television play

== See also ==
- Y: The Last Man, a comic book series by Brian K. Vaughan
- Y: The Last Man (TV series), a TV series based on the comic book series of the same name
- The Last Laugh, a landmark 1924 silent film whose original German title, Der letzte Mann, translates as "The Last Man"
- Le Dernier Homme (English: The Last Man), an 1805 French novel by Jean-Baptiste Cousin de Grainville
- The Last Woman (French: La Dernière femme; Italian: L'ultima donna) 1976 French-Italian film
- The Last Man Who Knew Everything, a 2006 biography of Thomas Young
- Last and First Men, a 1930 science fiction novel by Olaf Stapledon
- Last Human, a 1995 novel by Doug Naylor
- To the Last Man (disambiguation)
- Last Man Standing (disambiguation)
- The Last Man on Earth (disambiguation)
- The Last One (disambiguation)
- The Last (disambiguation)
- Last (disambiguation)
- End of the world (disambiguation)
- Eschatology, theology concerning the end of humanity
