= Free at Last =

Free at Last may refer to:

== Music ==
=== Albums ===
- Free at Last (DC Talk album), 1992
  - Free at Last: Extended Play Remixes, 1994
  - Free at Last: The Movie, a 2002 documentary about the release of the DC Talk album
- Free at Last (Free album)
- Free at Last (Freeway album)
- Free at Last (Mal Waldron album)
- Free at Last (Stretch Arm Strong album)
- Free at Last (Yukmouth album), 2010

=== Songs ===
- "Free at Last", a spiritual quoted by Rev. Martin Luther King, Jr. in his famous 1963 "I Have a Dream" speech
- "Free at Last", by Al Green from the album Livin' for You
- "Free at Last", a song by Joan Baez from the album Honest Lullaby
- "Free at Last", a song by G. Love & Special Sauce from Electric Mile
- "Free at Last", a song from the musical Big River
- "Free at Last", a song by Antony and the Johnsons from the album I Am a Bird Now
- "Free at Last", a song by Future from the mixtape 56 Nights
- "Free at Last", a song by Lee Moses from the album Time and Place

== Literature ==
- Free at Last, a book by E. E. Cleveland
- Free at Last, a book by Daniel Greenberg about the Sudbury Valley School
- Free at Last: A Documentary History of Slavery, Emancipation, and the Civil War, a book by Barbara J. Fields

== Other uses ==
- "I Have a Dream", a 1963 speech by Martin Luther King, Jr. that concludes "Free at last! Free at last! Thank God Almighty, we are free at last!"
  - "Free at Last", a section of James Furman's oratorio I Have a Dream, based on Dr. King's speech
- Free at Last, the 2002 theme of the Next Wave Festival, Melbourne, Australia
- Free at Last (horse), a Thoroughbred racehorse, the 1991 Canadian Champion Two-Year-Old Colt
- Free at Last, a Thoroughbred racehorse, dam of Coretta
- Free at Last (Big Love), an episode of the American TV series Big Love
- "Free at Last" (Hangin' with Mr. Cooper), a 1993 television episode
