= Tonto Basin (novel) =

1921 novel by Zane Grey

- Author: Zane Grey
- Language: English
- Genre: Western novel
- Publisher: Five Star (US hardback) & Leisure Books (US paperback)
- Publication date: 1921
- Publication place: United States
- Media type: Print (Hardback & Paperback)
- Pages: 330 p (hardback) & 321 p (paperback edition)
- ISBN: 978-0-8439-5602-3 (paperback edition); ISBN 978-1-59414-050-1 (hardback edition)
- OCLC: 63177922

For the geographical place see Tonto Basin

Tonto Basin is a western novel written by Zane Grey.

== Origin ==
Tonto Basin is the original version of the shorter novel To The Last Man (1921). Grey submitted the manuscript of Tonto Basin to the magazine The Country Gentleman, which published it in serialization as To the Last Man from May 28, 1921 through July 30, 1921. This was a much shorter version of the original leaving out much of the backstory and character development. This shorter version was published as a book by Harper Brothers in 1921.

== Plot introduction ==
A story of a feud between two families, the evil it causes, and the power of love to transcend all.

== Plot summary ==
The story begins with 24-year-old Jean Isbel in the last stages of a multi-week trip from Oregon to the frontier in Arizona where his family had moved four years earlier to start a cattle ranch. As he nears his destination he meets a woman in the woods, and falls in love at first sight. As they part they learn that they are mortal enemies. She is Ellen Jorth, and her family is locked in a deadly feud with his.

Jean dreads the part his father, Gaston, wants him to play in the feud. He can’t get Ellen out of his mind. They meet again and his words awake in her doubt and fear that her father, Lee Jorth, is not an honorable man but in fact a horse thief and cattle rustler. As events unfold her fears are proved true. Through thick and thin Jean Isbel defends Ellen’s honor and believes the best of her.

The feud erupts into fatal gun battles, first at the Isbel ranch house, and then at the general store in the nearby town. Most of the Isbel and Jorth clans are killed, with several of their allies. The remnant of the Jorths flee with Ellen in tow to a hide-out hidden in a deep box cañon.

Jean and his allies track them and there is a deadly gun battle in the woods nearby. Ellen is forced by one of the three remaining Jorth allies to flee once again. During their flight their horse is shot out from under them. Ellen now on foot meets one of the dying Isbels and finally learns the certain truth that her father, family, and their allies were horse thieves and cattle rustlers as she feared.

When she finally makes her way back to the hide-out, she arrives just after Jean has been forced to take refuge in the loft, unknown to her. One of the two remaining rustlers attacks her with rape in mind but is interrupted by the arrival of the other rustler. Ellen discovers Jean during this interruption. When the rustler returns a few minutes later, Ellen is forced to kill him to protect herself and Jean. A minute later Jean kills the last rustler.

The story ends with Jean and Ellen declaring their love for each other.

== Themes ==
The book is concerned with the destruction deadly violence wreaks on those family members who survive. Grey writes about the intense concern Jean feels for the impact the violence will have on the wives and children whose husbands and fathers will die in the feud.

The feud is caused by a love triangle between Gaston Isbel, Lee Jorth, and Ellen the woman both love, and the mother of Ellen Jorth. The story explores how love, betrayal, and jealousy can engender a hate which leads two men to destroy their families, without a thought to the pain and suffering of those relatives who will be left to bury the dead.

Ellen grows from a naïve girl to a woman of understanding under the severe trial of the events which overtake her. She begins to examine critically her own behavior with wisdom and insight. She grows and matures emotionally and psychologically, becoming aware that her father whom she had supported with unquestioning trust, is in fact a scoundrel, a thief, and a thoroughly dishonorable rogue. At the end she acts decisively and fatally to protect herself, her virtue, and the man she loves.

== Characters in "To the Last Man" ==
- Jean Isbel – the hero, a person of mixed race, being part Nez Perce
- Gaston Isbel – Jean's father, and the head of the Isbel faction.
- Guy Isble – Jean's oldest brother.
- Bill Isble – Jean's older brother.
- Ann Isble – Jean's sister.
- Andrew Colmor – Ann's fiancé.
- Jim Blaisdell – Gaston's good friend and supporter.
- Blue – member of the Isbel faction.
- Lee Jorth – the head of the Jorth faction.
- Ellen Jorth – Lee's daughter.
- Tad Jorth – Lee's brother, Ellen's uncle.
- Jackson Jorth – Lee's brother, Ellen's uncle.
- Jim Colter – member of the Jorth faction.
- Springer – member of the Jorth faction.
- Sommers – member of the Jorth faction.
- Rock Wells – member of the Jorth faction.
- Colter – member of the Jorth faction.
- Simm Bruce – member of the Jorth faction.
- Ben Greaves – owner of the General Store.
- John Sprague – Ellen's confidante and only friend.

== Publication ==
In the early 1990s, Jon Tuska, was researching the filmography of Zane Grey. During this research he discovered that Last of the Duanes and Rangers of the Lone Star were much altered from the holograph found "in the bottom drawer of a file cabinet in the Zane Grey, Inc. room where it had survived for eighty years.". This caused him to request that they "tell me of any other manuscripts...that had met a similar fate." The result was the discovery of the complete holographic manuscript of the novel To the Last Man. A comparison of the holograph with To the Last Man revealed that the holograph was much longer, and contained detail which altered the meaning of the story. The complete uncut version was published in 2004.

== See also ==
- To the Last Man is a 1933 Henry Hathaway film based on the Zane Grey novel starring Randolph Scott, Esther Ralston, Buster Crabbe, Barton MacLane, Noah Beery, Shirley Temple, and Eugenie Besserer.
- Frederick Russell Burnham participated on the losing side in the real-life Tonto Basin feud and narrowly escaped alive. After the feud, he went home to California and left for Africa only a few years later.
- Tonto Basin Outlaws (1941) - A film based very loosely on the Tonto Basin feud. These cowboys are out to stop a cattle-rustling scandal soon after they enlist with Teddy Roosevelt's Rough Riders. In the real-life feud, one man did go on to join the Rough Riders.
- Pleasant Valley War
