= USS General George M. Randall =

Troop transport ship

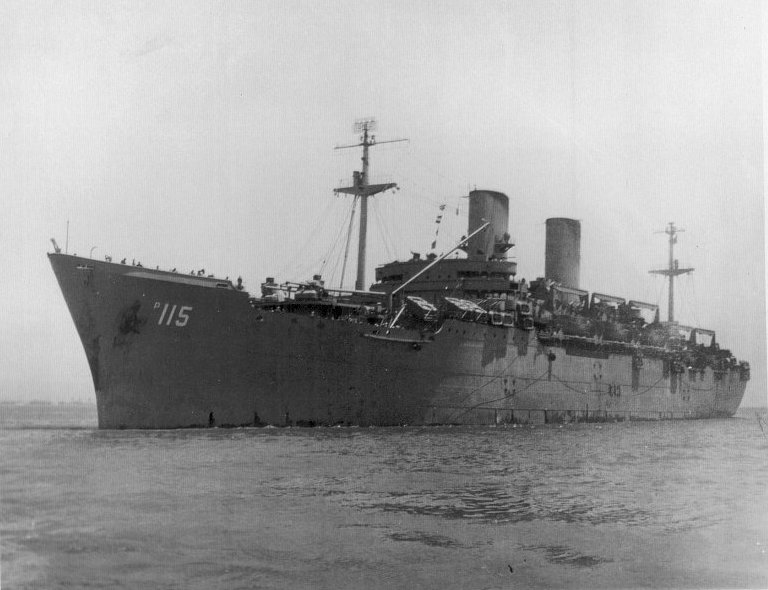
- USS General George M. Randall (AP-115) underway in 1945

History

United States
- Name: General George M. Randall
- Namesake: General George Morton Randall, US Army
- Ordered: 16 January 1942
- Builder: Federal Shipbuilding & Drydock
- Laid down: 20 July 1943
- Launched: 30 January 1944
- Sponsored by: Mrs. Adele Lovett
- Acquired: 15 April 1944
- Commissioned: 15 April 1944
- Decommissioned: 2 June 1961
- Maiden voyage: 23 May 1944
- Stricken: 1 September 1962
- Identification: MC hull type P2-S2-R2, MC hull no. 673
- Honors and awards: 12 medals and one clasp
- Fate: Sold for scrap, 8 May 1975

General characteristics
- Class & type: General John Pope-class transport
- Type: troopship
- Displacement: 11,450 tons (lt); 20,175 tons fully laden
- Length: 622 ft 7 in (189.76 m)
- Beam: 75 ft 6 in (23.01 m)
- Draft: 25 ft 6 in (7.77 m)
- Installed power: 17,000 shp
- Propulsion: 2 deLaval steam turbines, reduction gearing, twin screw
- Speed: 20.6 knots (38.2 km/h)
- Troops: 5,142
- Complement: 465
- Armament: 4 × 5"/38 caliber dual purpose guns (4x1); 16 × 1.1" guns (4x4), replaced by 8 x 40mm (4x2); 20 × single 20mm guns

USS General George M. Randall (AP-115) was a General John Pope class troop transport which served with the United States Navy in World War II and the postwar era. She was named after Major General George Morton Randall, an American Civil War hero, and veteran of the Indian wars of the 1880s and the Philippines in the early 1900s.

General George M. Randall was launched at the Federal Shipbuilding & Drydock Company, in Kearny, New Jersey, as Maritime Commission hull 673 on 30 January 1944 under a Maritime Commission contract; sponsored by Mrs. Adele Lovett, wife of the Assistant Secretary of War for Air Robert A. Lovett; acquired and simultaneously commissioned on 15 April 1944. She left the yard on 25 April 1944, for shakedown in Chesapeake Bay. The ship was crewed by the US Coast Guard in the war.

== World War II ==
General George M. Randall sailed from Norfolk, Virginia, on 23 May 1944 with nearly 5,000 troops and casuals aboard, and sailing through the Panama Canal, put in at Bombay, India, on 5 July via Panama and Australia. She left Melbourne, Australia on 28 July, and arrived in San Pedro, Los Angeles, on 12 August to debark over 2,000 wounded veterans. She made two more round-trip voyages from San Pedro to Bombay, via Melbourne, from 30 August 1944 to 28 February 1945.

On November 1, 1944, the Randall arrived at Wellington, with 733 Polish children on board who were orphans of the Evacuation of Polish civilians from the USSR in World War II.

On one trip from 19 December 1944 to 2 January 1945, she carried the 596th Air Engineering Squadron from San Pedro to Hobart, Tasmania, and then on to Bombay. On one of these trips, one of the Army passengers wrote a song The General George M. Randall Blues for a variety show en route. After debarking passengers, she moved to drydock for repairs and alterations, including the mounting of additional 20mm guns.

Moving to San Diego on 22 March 1945, she embarked passengers for Pearl Harbor and Ulithi and sailed for San Francisco, California, where she embarked more Navy casuals for Pearl Harbor and Ulithi. She then sailed for Pearl Harbor on 27 March. Pearl Harbor was reached on 2 April, and after debarking passengers she picked up more passengers for Ulithi and sailed on 4 April. Arriving there on 14 April, she acted as receiving ship until 23 May, redistributing some 4711 Navy and Marine casuals to other fleet units. She sailed for San Francisco on 23 May with 459 Navy, Coast Guard, and Marine casuals returning to the states, and arrived there on 5 June 1945.

The ship stood out under the Golden Gate on 8 June 1945 for Norfolk, passing through the Panama Canal again, and arriving there on 20 June. She sailed from Norfolk on 8 July for Marseille, where she arrived on 17 July. There she embarked over 5100 troops for redeployment in the Pacific theater in preparation of the invasion of Japan. She departed on 19 July, passing through the Panama Canal for the third time, with the destination of Okinawa. She arrived at Eniwetok on 16 August 1945 where she re-fueled, and left for Ulithi on 17 August. She departed Ulithi on 21 August with two other transports escorted by a destroyer escort. As the war had ended, she was directed to offload her troops at Manila rather than continue on to Okinawa. She arrived at Manila on 26 August, debarked the troops she was carrying, and loaded Army, Marine, and Coast Guard casuals for return to the United States. She took aboard more at Tacloban, then arrived at Ulithi on 6 September where she loaded still more. She departed Ulithi on 9 September heading for San Francisco, but was diverted en route to San Pedro, California, where she arrived on 21 September.

== After hostilities ==
As part of the Magic-Carpet fleet, General George M. Randall made six voyages from San Francisco and San Diego, California to the Far East, calling at Japan, China, Okinawa, and the Philippines. The first two of these trips were to re-patriate Japanese diplomats and their families back to Japan. On the first, she left San Pedro for Long Beach on 8 October 1945, and from there sailed on 18 October for Yokohama, Japan, where she arrived 29 October. She returned to Seattle on 12 November, loaded with returning service personnel, and sailed once more for Yokohama on 25 November. She arrived there on 10 December, and returned to Seattle on 19 December. She proceeded to San Francisco on 12 January 1946. Her Coast Guard crew was removed on 31 January 1946, and she was returned to Navy control.

== Peacetime duties ==
She sailed from Pearl Harbor on 1 December 1946 for the east coast; and after undergoing peacetime alterations at Philadelphia (including the removal of her armament), stood out of that port on 2 April 1947. Sailing through the Panama Canal again and reaching San Francisco on 25 April, the transport began a series of shuttle runs between West Coast ports and the Far East, completing six voyages to Guam (for example following its 11 May 1949 departure the ship arrived 18 May 1949 at Honolulu where many passengers received liberty, and later arrived 25 May 1949 at the Port of San Francisco), two to China and Japan, and two to Hawaii before she was assigned to the Military Sea Transportation Service (now the Military Sealift Command) in October 1949.

== Korean War ==
As an MSTS ship, General George M. Randall made scheduled runs between the West coast of the United States and the Orient until fighting erupted in Korea in the summer of 1950. She participated in the amphibious assault at Inchon which routed the North Korean Army and forced Communist evacuation of South Korea. After hordes of People's Liberation Army troops poured into Korea and trapped American forces, she served in the evacuation of Hungnam, which saved the embattled G.I.'s enabling them to return to the fight.

She moored at New York, New York, on 26 May 1951, and made four voyages from New York to Bremerhaven and Southampton before returning to the Pacific. On 11 March 1951, General George M. Randall departed Yokohama, Japan, with the bodies of 52 men, the first Korean War dead to be returned to the United States, including Major General Bryant E. Moore, who had commanded the IX Corps. Armed Services honor guards were in attendance at the departure, as was an Army Band, and was heavily covered by the press. The ship arrived at San Francisco, also carrying 1500 officers and men of the 1st Marine Division being rotated home for 30 day leave. She then returned to Yokohama on 24 October.

== Return to peacetime duties ==
For the next three years this far-ranging ship transported men and equipment across the Pacific between West Coast ports and Japan, Okinawa, and Taiwan. In 1955 she shifted operations to the East Coast, arriving at New York on 8 April 1955 for shuttle runs from New York to Bremerhaven, ensuring the continuous flow of troops, dependents, and supplies to American forces in Europe. In first three months of 1957 she cruised the Caribbean, calling at Puerto Rico, Cuba, and Jamaica before resuming her North Atlantic transport runs out of New York on 15 April.

In 1958, the General George M. Randall was the ship that carried then-Private Elvis Presley to his first assignment in Germany; in the voyage, Elvis performed in the ship's variety show as a piano player.

== Lebanon crisis ==
These varied duties were highlighted by General George M. Randall's role in the 1958 Lebanon crisis. Embarking 1,255 troops of the 35th Tank Battalion at Bremerhaven, and 1,001 others at La Pallice, France, she put them ashore at Beirut, Lebanon, the morning of 3 August 1958, helping to stabilize that country in this swift followup by sea of the 6th Fleet's action with aircraft carrier planes, surface warships, and amphibious landing of United States Marines. General George M. Randall then returned to New York, arriving there on 16 August.

Returning to her New York-Bremerhaven schedule, General George M. Randall visited Spain, Turkey, Greece, and Italy in 1959, and called at ports in Iceland and the Caribbean Islands in the next year as well.

== Awards ==
General George M. Randall received the following awards for her service: China Service Medal (extended), American Campaign Medal, Europe-Africa-Middle East Campaign Medal, Asiatic-Pacific Campaign Medal, World War II Victory Medal, Navy Occupation Service Medal (with Asia clasp), National Defense Service Medal, Korean Service Medal, Armed Forces Expeditionary Medal (1-Lebanon), Philippine Liberation Medal, United Nations Service Medal, Republic of Korea War Service Medal.

== Decommission ==
On her last voyage, she cast off from Rota, Spain, and moored at New York on 13 May 1961. General George M. Randall then steamed to Bayonne, New Jersey, where she was decommissioned on 2 June 1961 after 17 years of near-continuous service. She was towed to Norfolk on 12 June, and transferred to the United States Maritime Administration National Defense Reserve Fleet on 16 August, at James River, Virginia.

The ship was struck from the Naval Register on 1 September 1962, but was still retained as an asset in mothballs for 13 years. On 8 May 1975 she was sold for scrap for $687,000, and towed from James River to Taiwan for scrapping.
