= Last (disambiguation) =

A last is a form in the approximate shape of a human foot, used in shoemaking.

Last may also refer to:

== Places ==
- Hartashen, Syunik, Armenia, formerly called Last

== People ==
- Last (surname)

== Music ==
- Last (Unthanks album), a 2011 album by The Unthanks
- Last (Uverworld album), a 2010 album by Uverworld
- "Last", a song by Nine Inch Nails from the 1992 album Broken (EP)
- Last.fm, a UK-based music-community website

== Other uses ==
- Last, a 2015 South Korean television series
- Last of the month, a variable calendar date based on the length of a month
- Last (unit), a medieval measurement
- LAST, an acronym for Local Apparent Sidereal Time

== See also ==
- At Last (disambiguation)
- The Last (disambiguation)
- The Last One (disambiguation)
- The Last Man (disambiguation)
