= E. E. Cleveland =

American evangelist and civil rights activist

Edward Earl Cleveland
- Born: March 11, 1921; Huntsville, Alabama
- Died: August 30, 2009 (aged 88); Huntsville, Alabama
- Other name: E. E. Cleveland
- Education: Oakwood College (now Oakwood University)
- Spouse: Celia Marie Abney Cleveland ( – May 29, 2003)
- Children: Earl Clifford Cleveland

Ecclesiastical career
- Church: Seventh-day Adventist
- Offices held: Associate Secretary of Ministerial Association
- Title: Pastor

Edward Earl Cleveland (March 11, 1921 – August 30, 2009) was an American writer, civil rights advocate and evangelist of the Seventh-day Adventist Church.

== Biography ==
E. E. Cleveland was born in Huntsville, Alabama, on March 11, 1921, and died at the Huntsville Hospital on August 30, 2009, following an illness. He was married to Celia Marie Abney Cleveland on May 29, 1943, until her death in 2003.

They have one son, Earl Clifford Cleveland.

He preached his first sermon at the age of 9. At the age of 13 he was the Sabbath School secretary at his local church in Chattanooga, Tennessee.

In the course of his work he traveled extensively, visiting over 67 countries.

== Church ministry ==
E. E. Cleveland served the Seventh-day Adventist Church for over 67 years in active and post-retirement ministry. His positions included:

- 1942–1946 Ministerial Intern at Carolina Conference of Seventh-day Adventists
- 1946–1950 Evangelist in the South Atlantic Conference of Seventh-day Adventists
- 1950–1954 Evangelist in the Southern Union Conference of Seventh-day Adventists
- 1954–1977 Elected associate secretary for the Ministerial Association and became the first black man to integrate a department of the Adventist world church headquarters. He held that position for 23 years
- 1977–1986 Director of Department of Church Missions at Oakwood College (now University) in Huntsville, Alabama
- 1977– Instructor in the Department of Religion at Oakwood College

== Evangelism ==
E. E. Cleveland was an effective evangelist holding over 60 campaigns in 6 continents and training over 1,000 pastors. He was a Seventh-day Adventist church pioneer of the concept of evangelism in large cities and held national campaigns before satellite technology become common.

In what has been called one of the most successful evangelistic campaigns in Adventist history Cleveland was the first Seventh-day Adventist to baptize more than 1,000 people in a single campaign. Held in 1966 in Port of Spain, Trinidad the series was housed in two large tents pitched side by side and opened with 3,300 people in attendance, swelling to 7,000 by the final service.

In his campaigns, Cleveland baptized approximately 16,000 persons, including George Juko, the Crown Prince of Uganda. Many churches have been founded as a result of his campaigns. The Rev. Dr. Martin Luther King Jr., Rev. Ralph Abernathy and Rosa Parks are said to have attended his services in Montgomery.

== Civil Rights Activist ==
E. E. Cleveland was a long-time civil rights activist. He organized the N.A.A.C.P chapter for students on the campus of Oakwood College.

As a black evangelist, he encountered difficulties related to racism. In 1954 in Montgomery, Alabama police patrolled his tent meetings after being reported in violation of Alabama ordinances prohibiting whites and blacks to comingle in a public meeting. Cleveland had insisted that these ordinances need not be obeyed.

He participated in the first March on Washington with Dr. Martin Luther King Jr. and secured an 18-wheel tractor-trailer that served as a supply base for blankets and clothing.

He was a member of the Washington, D.C., branch of the Organizing Committee of the Poor People's Campaign of the Southern Christian Leadership Conference dating back to 1968.

Cleveland was twice the speaker for the South Florida S.C.L.C. Martin Luther King Jr. Day celebrations in 1986 and 1987 and was credited by the local Director of the S.C.L.C. with helping the branch get a street named for Dr. King in St. Petersburg, Florida. He has conducted Feed The Hungry programs in over 20 cities in the United States. Cleveland also helped to set up a feeding depot in Washington, D.C., for the relief of the hungry during the civil disturbance that followed the assassination of Dr. Martin Luther King Jr.

E. E. Cleveland was a co-founder and member of the Human Relations Committee of the General Conference of Seventh-day Adventists. He was a member of the Flying Squad, a special unit of the church to investigate racial injustices and recommend action. In 1968, he became the first black person to receive an honorary doctorate from Andrews University, a Seventh-day Adventist institution.

Cleveland was the first African American church leader sent to Asia (excluding India), Europe, South America and Australia. On February 25, 1993, Cleveland was inducted into the Martin Luther King Jr. collegium of preachers and scholars at Morehouse College in Atlanta, Georgia.

== Bibliography ==
E. E. Cleveland authored 16 published books.

- Mine Eyes Have Seen
- Come Unto Me
- The Middle Wall
- Free At Last
- Ask the Prophets
- Sparks from the Anvil
- No Stranger Now
- Without a Song
- Living Soul; "We Shall Overcome"
- The Gates Shall Not
- The Exodus
- Milk and Honey
- One More River
- Let the Church Roll On
- It took a miracle

Cleveland was an Associate Editor for Ministry, a monthly religious journal; contributing editor to Message magazine; contributing writer to Signs, Adventist Review, These Times and was a columnist to The North American Voice a monthly religious journal.

== Awards and honors ==
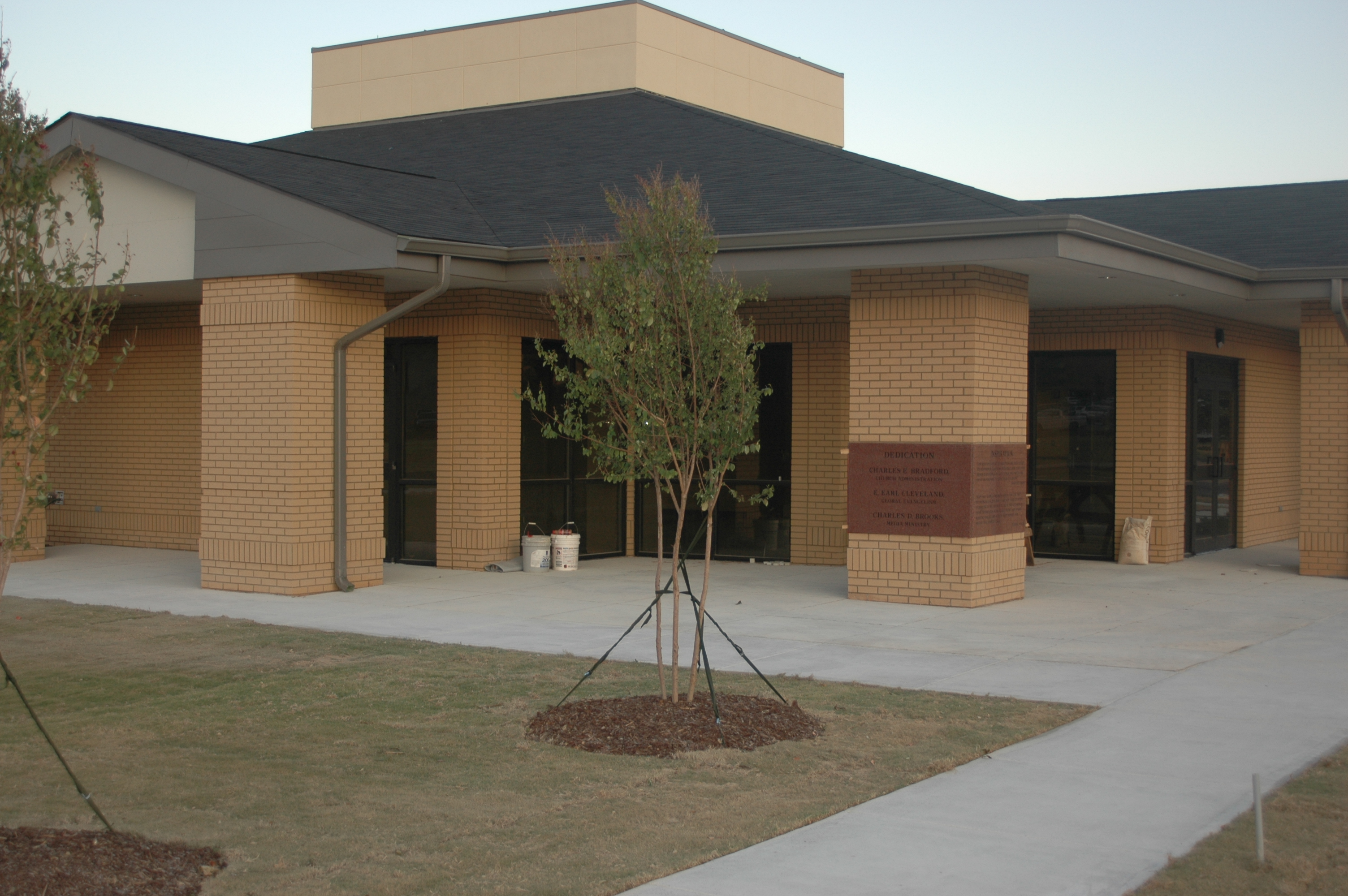
Bradford Cleveland Brooks Leadership Center at Oakwood University

- Honorary L.L.D. from Daniel Payne College 1968
- Honorary doctorate from Andrews University 1968
- D. Hum. Degree from Union Baptist Seminary
- Citing from Who's Who in Black America
- Citing from Who's Who in Religion in America
- Listed in Men of Achievement (I.B.C. Cambridge, England)
- Listed in Andrews University Focus Magazine as one of the most widely recognized Adventist personalities
- Twice voted Alumnus of the Year at Oakwood College
- Invited to the White House by former President Ronald Reagan for a briefing on international and national affairs
- Awarded Alabama's most distinguished Black clergyman by Guy Hunt, Governor of the State of Alabama on March 8, 1989.
- Inducted into the Martin Luther King Jr. collegium of preachers and scholars at Morehouse College On February 25, 1993,

Cleveland's life has been the subject of a biography E. E. Cleveland: Evangelist Extraordinary by Harold Lee with Monte Sahlin. His autobiography is titled Let the Church Roll On.

The Bradford-Cleveland-Brooks (BCB) Leadership Center at Oakwood University which opened in October 2007 is in part named for E. E. Cleveland. It houses a training center for evangelists and ministers as well as provides additional classroom space for the Department of Religion and Theology. This building is also home to the classes for the first master's degree program for the university (Master of Arts degree in pastoral studies).

== Donation of papers ==
In November 2007 Cleveland donated his collection of personal manuscripts, sermons and papers to the Center for Adventist Research at Andrews University. This collection of nearly 2000 sermon manuscripts, hundreds of pictures, personal books and audio-visual materials has been termed "priceless" and is available to researchers.
