= Last Man Standing: Killbook of a Bounty Hunter =

Last Man Standing: Killbook of a Bounty Hunter is a graphic novel series by Daniel LuVisi. The series, set 600 years in the future, and tells the story of Gabriel, the last living Paladin soldier.

== Graphic novel release ==
The first volume in the series was published on 29 September 2010 in both hardcover and softcover variants. And again in 2013 through Dark Horse Comics. It introduces the main character and his allies and enemies, and his overall plan of revenge against those who set him up.

== Plot ==
Last Man Standing: Killbook of a Bounty Hunter tells the story of Gabriel, a genetically engineered soldier. He is a warrior of supernatural strength, anointed as the guardian of Amerika and its people. Admired and celebrated by most, Gabriel's world takes a sudden turn when he finds himself framed by the terrorist group Pandemonium, for a series of atrocious crimes that he had no part in. For these alleged crimes, Gabriel is sent to the treacherous Level-9 Prison Facility and incarcerated with the very scum he helped put away. After nine years of torture and agony, the once famed hero kills his captors and escapes the 9 levels of hell he has been condemned to. From here on forward, Gabriel embarks on a journey into the heart of darkness; the New Amerika, a world filled with colorful and deadly characters that will either help or try to eliminate him – neither of which motive is always apparent. As the once invincible hero digs deep to unravel the true reason behind his framing, he also discovers a problem he never had to face before: he's beginning to lose what once made him who he is, and fast.

== Film ==
At San Diego Comic Con 2010, Paramount acquired the film rights for the series. As of November 2021, nothing has occurred with the property.
