= To the Last Man (Grey novel) =

1921 novel by Zane Grey

- Author: Zane Grey
- Language: English
- Genre: Western
- Publisher: Harper & Brothers (US hardback) & Forge (US paperback)
- Publication date: 1921
- Publication place: United States
- Media type: Print (Hardback & Paperback)
- Pages: 311 pp (hardback); 288 pp (paperback edition)
- ISBN: 0-8125-6465-0 (paperback edition)
- OCLC: 45577928
- LC Class: CPB Box no. 2090 vol. 18

To the Last Man: A Story of the Pleasant Valley War is a 1921 western novel written by Zane Grey.

== Origin ==
To The Last Man is a shorter version of Tonto Basin. Grey submitted the manuscript of Tonto Basin to the magazine The Country Gentleman, which published it in serialization as To the Last Man from May 28, 1921, through July 30, 1921. This was a much shorter version of the original, omitting much of the backstory. This shorter version was published by Harper Brothers.

== Plot introduction ==
It is a story of a family feud healed by young love. The story is based on a factual event involving the notorious Hashknife gang of Northern Arizona.

== Plot summary ==
The story follows an ancient feud between two frontier families that is inflamed when one of the families takes up cattle rustling.

The ranchers are led by Jean Isbel and, on the other side, Lee Jorth and his band of cattle rustlers.

In the grip of a relentless code of loyalty to their own people, they fight the war of the Tonto Basin, desperately, doggedly, to the last man, neither side seeing the futility of it until it is too late. And in this volatile environment, young Jean finds himself hopelessly in love with a girl from whom he is separated by an impassable barrier.

== Characters in "To the Last Man" ==
- Jean Isbel – Jean Isbel is a woodsman from Oregon drawn into the Tonto Basin feud by his father, Gaston Isbel. He has the reputation of being an excellent tracker and fighter. He is born from Gaston's second wife, who was Native American. He is in love with Ellen Jorth.
- Gaston Isbel – Gaston Isbel is a Texas cattleman ranching in the Tonto Basin. He is involved in an old feud with Lee Jorth. He calls his son Jean Isbel into the feud in the hope that Jean will help him win the feud.
- Lee Jorth – Lee Jorth is an ex-cattleman from Texas involved in an old feud with Gaston Isbel. He is supposedly a sheep herder running sheep on the cattle's range in the Tonto Basin. He is involved with many shady characters, including the notorious Hashknife gang. His daughter is Ellen Jorth.
- Ellen Jorth – is the daughter of Lee Jorth; is caught meeting Jean Isbel early in the story but because of the family feud cannot related to him as she might like. She is told lies by her father and placed in situations where she must uphold her family but secretly being in love with Jean.
- Colter – part of the Jorth group.
- Greaves – store keeper and part of the Jorth group.
- Bill – half brother to Jean Isbel; son of Gaston Isbel.
- Guy – half brother to Jean Isbel; son of Gaston Isbel.
- Jim Blaisdell – neighbor rancher to Gaston Isbel.
- John Sprague – old prospector lived near Jorth; was good friend to Ellen.
- Daggs – sheepman, part of the Jorth group.
- Blue – older gunslinger from Texas who tells them he is really King Fisher the famous gunfighter; this brings fear to the sheepmen.

== See also ==
- To the Last Man (1923 film)
- To the Last Man (1933 film), a 1933 Henry Hathaway film based on the Zane Grey novel starring Randolph Scott, Esther Ralston, Buster Crabbe, Barton MacLane, Noah Beery, Shirley Temple, and Eugenie Besserer.
- Frederick Russell Burnham participated on the losing side in the real-life Tonto Basin feud and narrowly escaped alive. After the feud, he went home to California and left for Africa only a few years later.
