= At Last (Lou Rawls album) =

Studio album by Lou Rawls
- Released: 1989
- Genre: Jazz
- Label: Blue Note
- Producer: Michael Cuscuna, Billy Vera

Lou Rawls chronology
Family Reunion (1987)	At Last (1989)	It's Supposed to Be Fun (1990)

At Last is an album by the American musician Lou Rawls, released in 1989. Promoted as a jazz album, it was timed to the 50th anniversary celebration of Blue Note Records. The album peaked at No. 1 on Billboard's Contemporary Jazz Albums chart. At Last was nominated for a Grammy Award for "Best Jazz Vocal Performance, Male". Rawls supported the album by playing several European jazz festivals.

== Production ==
The album was produced by Michael Cuscuna and Billy Vera. Rawls recorded his vocals live in the studio with his rhythm section. Lyle Lovett and Vera were among the album's songwriters. "That's Where It's At" is a duet with Ray Charles; Rawls sang on the original version by Sam Cooke. "Fine Brown Frame", a duet with Dianne Reeves, is a cover of the Nellie Lutcher song. "Two Years of Torture" was written by Percy Mayfield. "You Can't Go Home" is about how neighborhoods change over the years.

== Critical reception ==
Professional ratings
Review scores
Source	Rating
AllMusic	2.5/5 stars
Chicago Tribune	2/4 stars
The Rolling Stone Album Guide	3.5/5 stars
The Virgin Encyclopedia of R&B and Soul	3/5 stars

The New York Times wrote that "the album's songs, Mr. Rawls's rich drawling delivery and production that adds discreet pop flavoring to ensemble jazz arrangements all work together to bring jazz, blues and soul inflections into a perfectly relaxed and natural blend." Newsday praised the "superb session help from George Benson and Cornell Dupree." USA Today stated: "Rawls returns beautifully to his roots. At Last brings that velvety baritone back to the record label, the jazz/ blues standards and the small acoustic combo setting that launched his career nearly three decades ago." The Omaha World-Herald noted that, "although Rawls is always nice to hear, the jazz soloists keep the album from drifting into a smooth sameness."

== Track listing ==
No.	Title	Length
1.	"At Last"
2.	"Two Years of Torture"
3.	"Fine Brown Frame"
4.	"Good Intentions"
5.	"That's Where It's At"
6.	"If I Were a Magician"
7.	"You Can't Go Home"
8.	"Room with a View"
9.	"After the Lights Go Down Low"
10.	"She's No Lady"
11.	"Oh, What a Nite"
