= To the Last Man (1923 film) =

1923 film

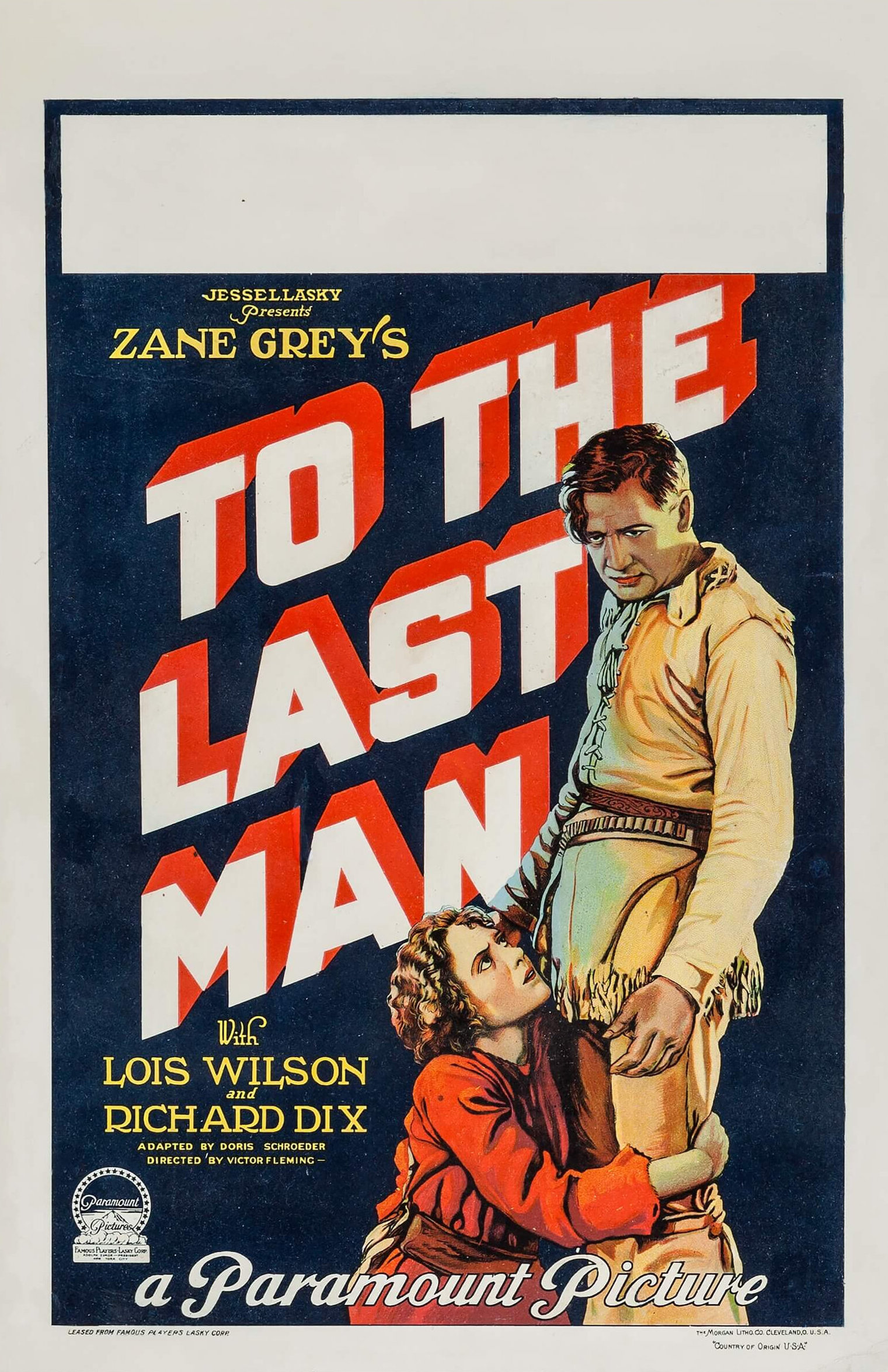
- Theatrical poster
- Directed by: Victor Fleming
- Written by: Doris Schroeder (scenario)
- Based on: To The Last Man; 1921 novel by Zane Grey
- Produced by: Adolph Zukor; Jesse L. Lasky
- Starring: Richard Dix; Lois Wilson; Noah Beery Sr.
- Cinematography: James Wong Howe; Bert Baldridge
- Distributed by: Paramount Pictures
- Release date: September 23, 1923
- Running time: 7 reels (6,965 feet)
- Country: United States
- Languages: Silent; English intertitles

To the Last Man is a 1923 American silent Western film based on the 1921 novel by Zane Grey, produced by Adolph Zukor and Jesse L. Lasky from Famous Players–Lasky, distributed by Paramount Pictures, directed by Victor Fleming, and starring Richard Dix, Lois Wilson, and Noah Beery. The cinematographer was James Wong Howe.

== Cast ==
- Richard Dix as Jean Isbel
- Lois Wilson as Ellen Jorth
- Noah Beery Sr. as Colter
- Robert Edeson as Gaston Isbel
- Frank Campeau as Blue
- Fred Huntley as Lee Jorth
- Ed Brady as Daggs
- Eugene Pallette as Simm Bruce
- Guy Oliver as Bill
- Winifred Greenwood as Mrs. Guy
- Tom London as Leonard Clapham

== Production ==
To the Last Man was shot on location at Tonto Basin, Arizona.

== Preservation ==
A complete print of To the Last Man is held in the Gosfilmofond archive in Moscow, Russia.

== 1933 remake ==
The picture was remade in 1933 under the direction of Henry Hathaway starring Randolph Scott, Esther Ralston, Noah Beery Sr. repeating his 1923 role, Jack La Rue, Buster Crabbe, Barton MacLane, an unbilled Shirley Temple, Fuzzy Knight, Gail Patrick, and an unbilled John Carradine.
