= The Last One (software) =

1981 BASIC program generator

- Original author: David James
- Developer: D.J. "AI" Systems
- Release: 1981; 45 years ago
- Type: Programming language

The Last One is a computer program released in 1981 by the British company D.J. "AI" Systems. Now obsolete, it took input from a user and generated an executable program in the BASIC computer language.

The name derived from the idea that The Last One was the last program that would ever need writing, as it could be used to generate all subsequent software.

The software was a program generator, as distinct from an actual programming language, as programs were generated by the user selecting options from menus that would form the basis of the generated code. This was done in a logical sequence that would eventually cause a program to be generated in BASIC. At any time, the user could elect to view a flow chart showing the current progress of the program's design.

The program was available on various different computer platforms of the time.

== Example ==
An example of a program to sort the names in a Christmas Card list in alphabetical order:

1. OPEN FILE <XMASLIST>
2. SET POINTER TO START OF FILE
3. SORT FILE
4. INPUT FROM FILE
5. IF END OF FILE REACHED BRANCH TO 8
6. OUTPUT DATA
7. UNCONDITIONAL BRANCH TO 4
8. TERMINATE
