= List of Dr. Stone episodes =

Key visual for the series

Dr. Stone is an anime television series produced by TMS Entertainment based on the manga series of the same name written by Riichiro Inagaki and illustrated by Boichi. Set 3,700 years after a mysterious light turns every human on the planet into stone, genius boy Senku Ishigami emerges from his petrification into a "Stone World" and seeks to rebuild human civilization from the ground up. The anime series is directed by Shinya Iino, with Yuichiro Kido as scriptwriter, and Yuko Iwasa as character designer. Tatsuya Kato, Hiroaki Tsutsumi, and Yuki Kanesaka composed the series' music. The first season aired from July 5 to December 13, 2019, on Tokyo MX and other networks. The first season ran for 24 episodes. The series is streamed by Crunchyroll worldwide outside of Asia, and Funimation produced a simuldub. The English dub of the series began airing on Adult Swim's Toonami programming block on August 25, 2019.

A second season of the series was announced following the broadcast of the first-season finale. The second season focuses on the "Stone Wars" story arc from the manga. Titled Dr. Stone: Stone Wars, the second season aired from January 14 to March 25, 2021, and ran for 11 episodes.

A sequel to the television series was announced following the conclusion of the second season. At the Jump Festa 2022 event, it was revealed that a TV special set immediately after the second season would premiere in 2022 and that a third season would premiere a year later in 2023. The television special, titled Dr. Stone: Ryusui, focuses on the character Ryusui Nanami and premiered on July 10, 2022. Shūhei Matsushita directed the special, while the rest of the main staff returned from the previous seasons. After the airing of Ryusui, the third season's title was revealed to be Dr. Stone: New World, with Matsushita returning from the special to direct. It consisted of two split season cours consisting of 11 episodes each. The first cours aired from April 6 to June 15, 2023, while the second cours aired from October 12 to December 21 of the same year.

Immediately following the conclusion of the third season, a fourth and final season titled Dr. Stone: Science Future was announced. The season comprises 37 episodes split across three cours, with the first cours (12 episodes) airing from January 9 to March 27, 2025. The second cours (12 episodes) aired from July 10 to September 25, 2025. The third and final cours (13 episodes) aired from April 2 to June 25, 2026.

== Series overview ==
Season	Episodes		Originally released	
Season	Episodes		First released	Last released
1	24		July 5, 2019	December 13, 2019
2	11		January 14, 2021	March 25, 2021
Special			July 10, 2022	
3	22	11	April 6, 2023	June 15, 2023
3	22	11	October 12, 2023	December 21, 2023
4	37	12	January 9, 2025	March 27, 2025
4	37	12	July 10, 2025	September 25, 2025
4	37	13	April 2, 2026	June 25, 2026

== Episodes ==
=== Season 1 (2019) ===
No. overall	No. in season	Title	Directed by (Note: Production staff information is taken from the ending credits of each episode)	Storyboarded by	Original release date	English air date
1	1	"Stone World"	Shinya Iino	Shinya Iino	July 5, 2019	August 25, 2019
2	2	"King of the Stone World"	Nana Harada	Yuu Kou & Yūki Ukai	July 12, 2019	September 1, 2019
3	3	"Weapons of Science"; Transliteration: "Kagaku no Buki" (Japanese: 科学の武器)	Hideaki Oba	Hideaki Oba	July 19, 2019	September 8, 2019
4	4	"Fire the Smoke Signal"; Transliteration: "Noroshi o Agero" (Japanese: 狼煙をあげろ)	Oyunam	Osamu Nabeshima	July 26, 2019	September 15, 2019
5	5	"Stone World the Beginning"	Tomomi Ikeda	Yuu Kou & Yūki Ukai	August 2, 2019	September 22, 2019
6	6	"Two Nations of the Stone World"; Transliteration: "Ishi no Sekai no Futatsu no Kuni" (Japanese: 石の世界の二つの国)	Nana Harada	Yuu Kou & Yūki Ukai	August 9, 2019	October 5, 2019 (Note: Adult Swim premiered episodes 6 and 7 of Dr. Stone at 11:30 p.m. and 12:00 a.m. EDT/PDT, respectively, on the night of October 5–6, 2019. While episode 6 actually aired on Saturday night, episode 7 effectively aired on Sunday morning.)
7	7	"Where Two Million Years Have Gone"; Transliteration: "Ni-hyaku-man-nen no Arika" (Japanese: 200万年の在処)	Kentarō Kawajiri & Osamu Nabeshima	Osamu Nabeshima	August 16, 2019	October 6, 2019
8	8	"Stone Road"	Hideaki Oba	Hideaki Oba	August 23, 2019	October 13, 2019
9	9	"Let There Be the Light of Science"; Transliteration: "Kono Te ni Kagaku no Hi o" (Japanese: この手に科学の灯を)	Tomomi Ikeda	Norihiro Naganuma	August 30, 2019	October 20, 2019
10	10	"A Flimsy Alliance"; Transliteration: "Usuppera no Dōmei" (Japanese: 薄っぺらの同盟)	Kentarō Kawajiri & Yūsuke Onoda	Kentarō Kawajiri	September 6, 2019	October 27, 2019
11	11	"Clear World"	Nana Harada	Hideto Komori	September 13, 2019	November 3, 2019
12	12	"Buddies Back to Back"; Transliteration: "Senaka Awase no Nakama-tachi" (Japanese: 背中合わせの仲間たち)	Hideaki Oba	Shunsuke Machitani	September 20, 2019	November 10, 2019
13	13	"Masked Warrior"; Transliteration: "Kamen no Senshi" (Japanese: 仮面の戦士)	Atsuji Kaneko	Kentarō Kawajiri	September 27, 2019	November 17, 2019
14	14	"Master of Flame"	Osamu Nabeshima	Hideaki Oba	October 4, 2019	November 24, 2019
15	15	"The Culmination of Two Million Years"; Transliteration: "Ni-hyaku-man-nen no Kesshō" (Japanese: 200万年の結晶)	Tomomi Ikeda	Osamu Nabeshima	October 11, 2019	December 8, 2019
16	16	"A Tale for the Ages"; Transliteration: "Ikusen-nen Monogatari" (Japanese: 幾千年物語)	Nana Harada	Shunsuke Machitani	October 18, 2019	December 15, 2019
17	17	"A Hundred Nights and a Thousand Skies"; Transliteration: "Hyaku no Yoru to Sen no Sora" (Japanese: 百の夜と千の空)	Nana Harada & Kentarō Kawajiri	Ikuo Morimoto	October 25, 2019	January 4, 2020 (Note: Adult Swim moved Dr. Stone from 12:00 a.m. to 11:30 p.m. EST/PST, making the airing dates from episodes 17 to 24 actually on Saturday night.)
18	18	"Stone Wars"	Hideaki Oba	Hideaki Oba	November 1, 2019	January 11, 2020
19	19	"To Modernity"; Transliteration: "Soshite Gendai e" (Japanese: そして現代へ)	Shunji Yoshida	Daiki Maezawa	November 8, 2019	January 18, 2020
20	20	"The Age of Energy"; Transliteration: "Dōryoku no Jidai" (Japanese: 動力の時代)	Shizutaka Sugahara & Tomomi Ikeda	Sakura Koyama	November 15, 2019	January 25, 2020
21	21	"Spartan Crafts Club"; Transliteration: "Suparuta Kōsaku Kurabu" (Japanese: スパルタ工作クラブ)	Tetsuji Nakamura & Osamu Nabeshima	Osamu Nabeshima	November 22, 2019	February 1, 2020
22	22	"The Treasure"	Nana Harada & Tomochi Kosaka	Daiki Maezawa	November 29, 2019	February 8, 2020
23	23	"Wave of Science"; Transliteration: "Kagaku no Nami" (Japanese: 科学の波)	Kentarō Kawajiri, Hideaki Oba, & Shinya Iino	Kentarō Kawajiri, Hideaki Oba, & Shinya Iino	December 6, 2019	February 15, 2020
24	24	"Voices Over Infinite Distance"; Transliteration: "Koe wa Mugen no Kanata e" (Japanese: 声は無限の彼方へ)	Tomomi Ikeda & Shinya Iino	Ikuo Morimoto & Shinya Iino	December 13, 2019	February 22, 2020

=== Season 2: Stone Wars (2021) ===
No. overall	No. in season	Title	Directed by	Storyboarded by	Original release date	English air date
25	1	"Stone Wars Beginning"	Nana Harada	Shinya Iino	January 14, 2021	May 16, 2021
26	2	"Hot Line"	Kentarō Kawajiri	Kentarō Kawajiri	January 21, 2021	May 23, 2021
27	3	"Call from the Dead"; Transliteration: "Shisha Kara no Denwa" (Japanese: 死者からの電話)	Osamu Nabeshima	Osamu Nabeshima	January 28, 2021	May 30, 2021
28	4	"Full Assault"; Transliteration: "Zengun Shutsugeki" (Japanese: 全軍出撃)	Tomomi Ikeda	Shinya Iino	February 4, 2021	June 6, 2021
29	5	"Steam Gorilla"	Kentarō Kawajiri	Kentarō Kawajiri	February 11, 2021	June 13, 2021
30	6	"Prison Break"	Nana Harada	Masayuki Miyaji	February 18, 2021	June 20, 2021
31	7	"Secret Mission"; Transliteration: "Gokuhi no Misshon" (Japanese: 極秘のミッション)	Osamu Nabeshima	Osamu Nabeshima	February 25, 2021	June 27, 2021
32	8	"Final Battle"	Nana Harada	Norihiro Naganuma	March 4, 2021	July 4, 2021
33	9	"To Destroy and to Save"; Transliteration: "Kowasu Mono Sukuu Mono" (Japanese: 壊すもの救うもの)	Tomomi Ikeda & Shinya Iino	Shinya Iino	March 11, 2021	July 11, 2021
34	10	"Humanity's Strongest Tag Team"; Transliteration: "Jinrui Saikyō no Taggu" (Japanese: 人類最強のタッグ)	Kentarō Kawajiri	Kentarō Kawajiri	March 18, 2021	July 18, 2021
35	11	"Prologue of Dr. Stone"	Nana Harada	Shinya Iino	March 25, 2021	July 25, 2021

=== Dr. Stone: Ryusui (2022) ===
No.	Title	Directed by	Storyboarded by	Original release date
35.5 (Special)	Dr. Stone: Ryusui; Transliteration: "Dokutā Sutōn: Ryūsui" (Japanese: Dr.STONE 龍水)	Nana Harada	Shūhei Matsushita, Hiroyuki Hata, Shunsuke Machitani & Nana Harada	July 10, 2022
A television special that takes place between the events of seasons 2 and 3; following the defeat of the Tsukasa Empire, the now much larger Kingdom of Science prepare to embark to the other side of the globe to discover the source of humanity's petrification 3,700 years ago. In order to do this, they begin construction on a large ship to cross the ocean. Senku realizes they will need a captain who has loads of experience with sailing the open seas, and to that end they revive Ryusui Nanami: a young man who is an extremely skilled sailor, and heir to the once powerful Nanami conglomerate pre-petrification. However, Senku and the kingdom must find middle ground with Ryusui's greedy demands, and it's proposed that if the kingdom finds Sagara Oil Field to extract the oil needed to operate the ship, they will give Ryusui full ownership of it. Ryusui immediately reinvents currency and uses it to establish a market system within the kingdom, thus being able to get paid for the oil once it's discovered. Senku deploys Chrome, Kohaku and Ukyo with a map of Japan's modern world coastline to scout for the location of the oil field, but they hit a dead end once its discovered that volcanic activity over the millenniums has vastly changed the terrain shown on Senku's map, thus making it next to impossible to locate it. In order to accurately redraw the coastline map so that they may locate the field, Senku and the kingdom manufacture a hot air balloon made of cloths of hemp. After a staged card pick-up raffle is orchestrated by Gen to determine who will join Senku in the balloon, it is determined that Ryusui and Chrome will join and the trio take off into the sky early the following morning. Unfortunately, during their test run to Ishigami Village, they are caught off guard by a sudden storm and get caught in its updraft. They barely manage to escape by lifting the balloon up through the clouds. As they safely reach the village, Senku and company are now ready to move on to the next step.

=== Season 3: New World (2023) ===
No. overall	No. in season	Title	Directed by	Storyboarded by	Original release date	English air date
Part 1
36	1	"New World Map"	Tomomi Ikeda	Shinji Takagi	April 6, 2023	June 4, 2023
37	2	"Greed Equals Justice"; Transliteration: "Hoshī Ikōru Seigi" (Japanese: 欲しい=正義)	Tomochi Kosaka	Hiroyuki Hata	April 13, 2023	June 11, 2023
38	3	"First Contact"; Transliteration: "Fāsuto Kontakuto" (Japanese: ファーストコンタクト)	Yoshinobu Kasai	Yoshinobu Kasai	April 20, 2023	June 18, 2023
39	4	"Eyes of Science"; Transliteration: "Kagaku no Me" (Japanese: 科学の眼)	Shigeki Awai	Shinji Satō & Daiki Koyama	April 27, 2023	June 25, 2023
40	5	"Science Vessel Perseus"; Transliteration: "Kagakusen Peruseusu" (Japanese: 科学船ペルセウス)	Nana Harada	Chie Nishizawa	May 4, 2023	July 9, 2023
41	6	"Treasure Box"	Tomochi Kosaka	Shinji Takagi	May 11, 2023	July 23, 2023 (Note: Episode 42 of Dr. Stone erroneously aired in place of episode 41 on Adult Swim on the night of July 15/16, 2023. To accommodate for the mistake, the block aired #41 the following week on July 23rd and re-aired #42 on July 30th. For reader consistency, the table uses the intentional rebroadcast date for #42.)
42	7	"Ray of Despair, Ray of Hope"; Transliteration: "Zetsubō to Kibō no Hikari" (Japanese: 絶望と希望の光)	Tomomi Ikeda	Shinpei Nagai	May 18, 2023	July 30, 2023
43	8	"The Trump Card Aboard the Science Vessel"; Transliteration: "Kirifuda wa Kagaku no Fune ni" (Japanese: 切り札は科学の船に)	Tomoko Hiramuki, Ying Xing Mao, Tomochi Kosaka & Erio	Mitsuko Kase	May 25, 2023	August 6, 2023
44	9	"Beautiful Science"; Transliteration: "Utsukushī Kagaku" (Japanese: 美しい科学)	Yoshihiro Nishio	Nana Harada	June 1, 2023	August 13, 2023
45	10	"Science Wars"	Harume Kosaka	Satoshi Shimizu	June 8, 2023	August 20, 2023
46	11	"With This Fist, A Miracle"; Transliteration: "Kiseki wa Kono Tenohira de" (Japanese: 奇跡はこの掌で)	Nana Harada	Satoshi Shimizu	June 15, 2023	August 27, 2023
Part 2
47	12	"The Kingdom of Science's Counterattack"; Transliteration: "Hangeki no Kagaku Ōkoku" (Japanese: 反撃の科学王国)	Tomomi Ikeda	Satoshi Shimizu	October 12, 2023	November 12, 2023
48	13	"The Medusa's True Face"; Transliteration: "Medyūsa no Sugao" (Japanese: メデューサの素顔)	Koichiro Kuroda	Satoshi Shimizu	October 19, 2023	November 19, 2023
49	14	"Deal Game, Test of Wit"; Transliteration: "Zunō-sen no Dīru Gēmu" (Japanese: 頭脳戦のディールゲーム)	Nana Fujiwara	Shinichi Tōkairin	October 26, 2023	November 26, 2023
50	15	"Battle in Three Dimensions"; Transliteration: "Sanjigen no Kessen" (Japanese: 三次元の決戦)	Yusaku Saotome	Shinji Takagi	November 2, 2023	December 3, 2023
51	16	"Total War"; Transliteration: "Zendo Dairansen" (Japanese: 全土大乱戦)	Osamu Nabeshima	Osamu Nabeshima	November 9, 2023	December 10, 2023
52	17	"Joker"	Nana Harada & Tomochi Kosaka	Susumu Nishizawa	November 16, 2023	December 17, 2023
53	18	"Flicker of Doom"; Transliteration: "Horobi no Kirameki" (Japanese: 滅びの煌めき)	Harume Kosaka	Shinji Takagi	November 23, 2023	December 17, 2023
54	19	"Last Man Standing"	Tomomi Ikeda	Shinichi Tōkairin	November 30, 2023	January 14, 2024
55	20	"First Dream"	Nana Fujiwara	Daiki Koyama	December 7, 2023	January 21, 2024
56	21	"Treasure Island"; Transliteration: "Takarajima" (Japanese: ｢宝島｣)	Nana Harada	Satoshi Shimizu	December 14, 2023	January 28, 2024
57	22	"Beyond the New World"	Shūhei Matsushita	Satoshi Shimizu	December 21, 2023	February 4, 2024

=== Season 4: Science Future (2025–2026) ===
No. overall	No. in season	Title	Directed by	Written by	Storyboarded by	Original release date
Part 1
58	1	"Ryusui vs. Senku"	Nana Harada	Kurasumi Sunayama	Satoshi Shimizu	January 9, 2025
59	2	"Science Journey"	Nana Fujiwara	Kurasumi Sunayama	Hideaki Oba	January 16, 2025
60	3	"Light Trap in the Darkness"; Transliteration: "Kurayami no Yūgatō" (Japanese: 暗闇の誘蛾灯)	Tomomi Ikeda	Aki Kindaichi	Satoshi Shimizu	January 23, 2025
61	4	"Dr. X"	Kayona Yamada	Kurasumi Sunayama	Chie Nishizawa	January 30, 2025
62	5	"Doctor vs. Doctor"	Chako Sato	Aki Kindaichi	Daiki Koyama	February 6, 2025
63	6	"Science Is Elegant"	Osamu Nabeshima	Kurasumi Sunayama	Osamu Nabeshima	February 13, 2025
64	7	"The Two Scientists"; Transliteration: "Futari no Kagaku-sha" (Japanese: 二人の科学者)	Shunji Yoshida	Aki Kindaichi	Satoshi Shimizu	February 20, 2025
65	8	"Lock On"	Chako Sato	Kurasumi Sunayama	Satoshi Shimizu	February 27, 2025
66	9	"Light of Science"; Transliteration: "Kagaku no Akari" (Japanese: 科学の灯)	Tomomi Ikeda	Aki Kindaichi	Daiki Koyama	March 6, 2025
67	10	"Dirty Roads"; Transliteration: "Tsuchi Mamire no Michi o" (Japanese: 土まみれの道を)	Kayona Yamada	Kurasumi Sunayama	Kayona Yamada	March 13, 2025
68	11	"Those Who Know the Rules; Those Who Make Them"; Transliteration: "Rūru o Shiru-mono; Tsukuru-mono" (Japanese: ルールを知る者創る者)	Tomochi Kosaka & Nana Harada	Aki Kindaichi	Yoshiharu Ashino	March 20, 2025
69	12	"Reunion"; Transliteration: "Saikai" (Japanese: 再会)	Osamu Nabeshima	Kurasumi Sunayama	Osamu Nabeshima	March 27, 2025
Part 2
70	13	"Watching the Same Moon"; Transliteration: "Onaji Tsuki o Mite" (Japanese: 同じ月を見て)	Shunji Yoshida	Aki Kindaichi	Hiroyuki Shimazu	July 10, 2025
71	14	"Earth Race"	Nobutaka Kondō	Kurasumi Sunayama	Satoshi Shimizu	July 17, 2025
72	15	"The Escape"; Transliteration: "Hōimō Toppa-sen" (Japanese: 包囲網突破戦)	Tomomi Ikeda	Aki Kindaichi	Satoshi Shimizu	July 24, 2025
73	16	"Medusa Mechanism"	Kayona Yamada	Kurasumi Sunayama	Kayona Yamada	July 31, 2025
74	17	"Sickening Yet Beautiful"; Transliteration: "Ozomashiku mo Utsukushiku" (Japanese: 悍ましくも美しく)	Osamu Nabeshima	Aki Kindaichi	Osamu Nabeshima	August 7, 2025
75	18	"Diamond Heart"	Shigeki Awai	Kurasumi Sunayama	Takashi Kawabata	August 14, 2025
76	19	"Stone Sanctuary"	Nana Harada	Aki Kindaichi	Akira Nishimori	August 21, 2025
77	20	"What I Once Sought to Destroy"; Transliteration: "Katsute Kesō to Shita Mono wa" (Japanese: かつて消そうとしたものは)	Tomomi Ikeda & Yoshinari Saitō	Aki Kindaichi	Osamu Yamasaki	August 28, 2025
78	21	"Our Dr. Stone"	Kayona Yamada	Kurasumi Sunayama	Yui Miura	September 4, 2025
79	22	"Until We Meet Again"; Transliteration: "Mata Au Hi Made" (Japanese: また逢う日まで)	Osamu Nabeshima	Aki Kindaichi	Osamu Nabeshima	September 11, 2025
80	23	"Scientist, All Alone"; Transliteration: "Hitoribocchi no Saientisuto" (Japanese: ひとりぼっちのサイエンティスト)	Nana Harada	Kurasumi Sunayama	Chie Nishizawa, Satoshi Shimizu & Osamu Nabeshima	September 18, 2025
81	24	"Whole New World"	Osamu Yamasaki	Aki Kindaichi	Satoshi Shimizu	September 25, 2025
Part 3
82	25	"Future Engine"	Kim Min Seon & Yoshinari Saitō	Kurasumi Sunayama	Satoshi Shimizu	April 2, 2026
83	26	"Fire"	Shinichi Fukumoto	Aki Kindaichi	Akira Nishimori	April 9, 2026
84	27	"The Universe Is Written in the Language of Mathematics"; Transliteration: "Uchū wa Sūgaku to iu Gengo de Kakarete iru" (Japanese: 宇宙は数学という言語で書かれている)	Osamu Nabeshima	Kurasumi Sunayama	Osamu Nabeshima	April 16, 2026
85	28	"Dawn of the Computer"; Transliteration: "Konpyūtā no Yoake" (Japanese: コンピューターの夜明け)	Tomomi Ikeda	Aki Kindaichi	Mitsuko Kase	April 23, 2026
86	29	"The Truth About the Rocket"; Transliteration: "Roketto no Shinsō" (Japanese: ロケットの真相)	Yuka Yamato	Kurasumi Sunayama	Hiroyuki Oshima	April 30, 2026
87	30	"Stone to Space"	Nana Harada	Kurasumi Sunayama	Hatsuki Tsuji	May 7, 2026
88	31	"Unknown Known"	Yingchen Lin	Aki Kindaichi	Susumu Nishizawa	May 14, 2026
89	32	"Challengers of Science"; Transliteration: "Kagaku no Chōsen-sha" (Japanese: 科学の挑戦者)	Yasuro Tsuchiya	Kurasumi Sunayama	Hatsuki Tsuji	May 21, 2026
90	33	"Wanting Everything"; Transliteration: "Subete ga Hoshikute" (Japanese: 全てが欲しくて)	Yuka Yamato & Yūki Taki	Aki Kindaichi	Tetsuo Hirakawa	May 28, 2026
91	34	"Countdown"	Tomomi Ikeda	Kurasumi Sunayama	Hiroyuki Oshima	June 4, 2026
92	35	"Giant Step"	Osamu Nabeshima	Aki Kindaichi	Osamu Nabeshima	June 11, 2026
93	36	"Why-Man"	Nana Harada	Kurasumi Sunayama	Hiroyuki Oshima	June 18, 2026
94	37	"Ushers of an Exhilarating Future"; Transliteration: "Mirai o Sosoru Mono" (Japanese: 未来を唆るもの)	Shūhei Matsushita	Kurasumi Sunayama	Satoshi Shimizu	June 25, 2026
