= To the Last Man (1933 film) =

1933 film by Henry Hathaway

- Directed by: Henry Hathaway
- Screenplay by: Jack Cunningham
- Based on: To The Last Man by Zane Grey
- Produced by: Harold Hurley
- Starring: Randolph Scott; Esther Ralston; Noah Beery Sr. Buster Crabbe; Barton MacLane; Gail Patrick; Shirley Temple; Fuzzy Knight; John Carradine
- Cinematography: Ben F. Reynolds
- Edited by: Jack Scott
- Music by: John Leipold; Ralph Rainger
- Production company: Paramount Pictures
- Distributed by: Paramount Pictures
- Release date: September 15, 1933
- Running time: 70 minutes
- Country: United States
- Language: English

To the Last Man is a 1933 American pre-Code Western film directed by Henry Hathaway and starring Randolph Scott and Esther Ralston. The screenplay by Jack Cunningham was based on the 1921 novel of the same name by Zane Grey. The novel, optioned to Paramount Pictures, was previously made as Victor Fleming's 1923 silent film version of the same title. The supporting cast of Hathaway's version features Noah Beery Sr. (reprising his role from the 1923 version, though under a different name), Jack La Rue, Buster Crabbe, Barton MacLane, Fuzzy Knight, Gail Patrick, and, in uncredited roles, a five-year-old Shirley Temple and John Carradine. The film was reissued for American television under the title Law of Vengeance.

== Plot ==
A feud between the Colby and the Hayden families starts in the hills of Kentucky and continues in the mountains of the West after the American Civil War. Also involved is the conflict between vigilantism and the law in a frontier environment, and the consequences of romance between members of feuding families. At one point during the ensuing mayhem, one of the villains shoots in front of a 5-year-old girl the head off her doll.

== Cast ==
- Randolph Scott as Lynn Hayden
- Esther Ralston as Ellen Colby
- Noah Beery Sr. as Jed Colby
- Jack La Rue as Jim Daggs
- Buster Crabbe as Bill Hayden
- Barton MacLane as Neil Stanley
- Gail Patrick as Ann Hayden Stanley
- Muriel Kirkland as Molly Hayden
- Egon Brecher as Mark Hayden
- Fuzzy Knight as Jeff Morley
- James Eagles as Eli Bruce (credited as James C. Eagles)
- Eugenie Besserer as Granny Spelvin
- Harlan Knight as Grandpa Chet Spelvin
- John Carradine as Pete Garon (uncredited)
- Harry Cording as Fred (uncredited)
- Shirley Temple as Mary Stanley (uncredited)
- Delmar Watson as Tad Stanley (uncredited)

== Production ==
To the Last Man was filmed on location in California, at Big Bear Valley in San Bernardino County and Big Pine in Inyo County.

== Reception ==
In his 1992 book The Hollywood Western: Ninety Years of Cowboys and Indians, Train Robbers, Sheriffs and Gunslingers, film historian William K. Everson notes that the Zane Grey series was "uniformly good." He also writes:

To the Last Man was almost a model of its kind, an exceptionally strong story of feuding families in the post-Civil War era, with a cast worthy of an "A" feature, excellent direction by Henry Hathaway, and an unusual climactic fight between the villain (Jack La Rue) and the heroine (Esther Ralston in an exceptionally appealing performance).

== See also ==
- List of films in the public domain in the United States
- List of films and television shows about the American Civil War

== Bibliography ==
- Edwards, Anne (1988), Shirley Temple: American Princess, William Morrow and Company
