= Les Misérables (1917 film) =

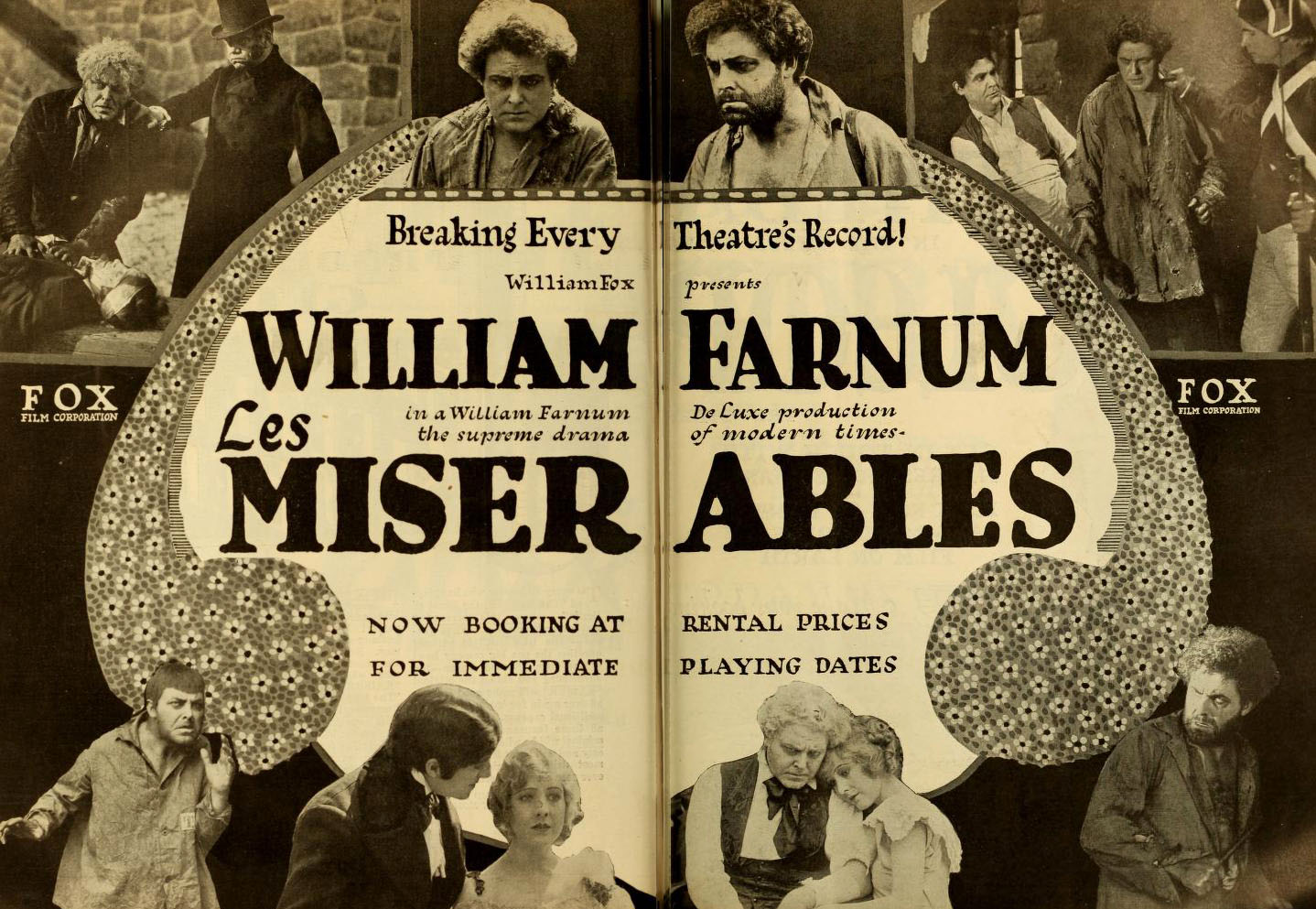
- Advertisement
- Directed by: Frank Lloyd
- Screenplay by: Frank Lloyd and Marc Robbins
- Based on: Les Misérables; 1862 novel by Victor Hugo
- Produced by: William Fox
- Starring: William Farnum; Hardee Kirkland and George Moss
- Cinematography: William C. Foster; George Schneiderman
- Production company: Fox Studio
- Distributed by: Fox Film Corporation; Standard Pictures
- Release date: December 3, 1917
- Running time: 90 minutes
- Country: United States
- Language: Silent (English intertitles)

Les Misérables is one of many filmed versions of the 1862 Victor Hugo novel of the same name. It is a 1917 American silent film directed by Frank Lloyd, co-written by Lloyd and Marc Robbins, and produced by William Fox, released on December 3, 1917. It starred William Farnum, Hardee Kirkland, and George Moss.

== Background and production ==
Even by the time this film was created in 1917, there had already been "at least a dozen" film adaptations of this Victor Hugo novel. Only a portion of the novel was included in the screenplay, but it included some of "the most famous" events, such as the story of the Bishop who gave Valjean his silver candlesticks in order to start a new life, and the street rebellion that was part of the June 1832 Rebellion.

William Farnum was "Fox's biggest male box-office attraction" when the movie was made, and had previously appeared in Lloyd's 1917 film adaptation of the 1859 Charles Dickens novel A Tale of Two Cities.

== Plot ==
Jean Valjean is a French peasant who spends almost twenty years in prison for stealing a loaf of bread to feed his family, and then—when his "yellow passport" (given to him because of his status as a convicted criminal) makes it almost impossible to build a new life—he steals silverware from a kind Catholic Bishop who had given him a meal and a place to sleep. When the police find him with the silver they return him to the Bishop to confirm the theft, but the Bishop surprises Valjean by telling the police the silver had been a gift, and then adding his silver candlesticks, saying Valjean must have mistakenly left them behind because they were part of the gift. Valjean uses the money to start a new life under a new name, eventually becoming mayor of a small town, but police inspector Javert suspects Valjean, and works relentlessly to reveal his true identity and his past crimes.

== Cast ==
- William Farnum as Jean Valjean
- Hardee Kirkland as Javert
- George Moss as the Bishop
- Gretchen Hartman as Fantine
- Jewel Carmen as Cosette
  - Kittens Reichert as Cosette (child)
- Harry Spingler as Marius Pontmercy
- Edward Elcott and Mina Ross as the Thénardiers
- Anthony Phillips as Gavroche
- Dorothy Bernard as Éponine

== Reception ==
Like many American films of the time, Les Misérables was subject to cuts by city and state film censorship boards. For example, the Chicago Board of Censors cut the two intertitles "Why should you starve when you are young enough to attract me?" and "And you are still young to attract".

== See also ==
- Adaptations of Les Misérables
