= Jewel Carmen =

American silent film actress (1897–1984)

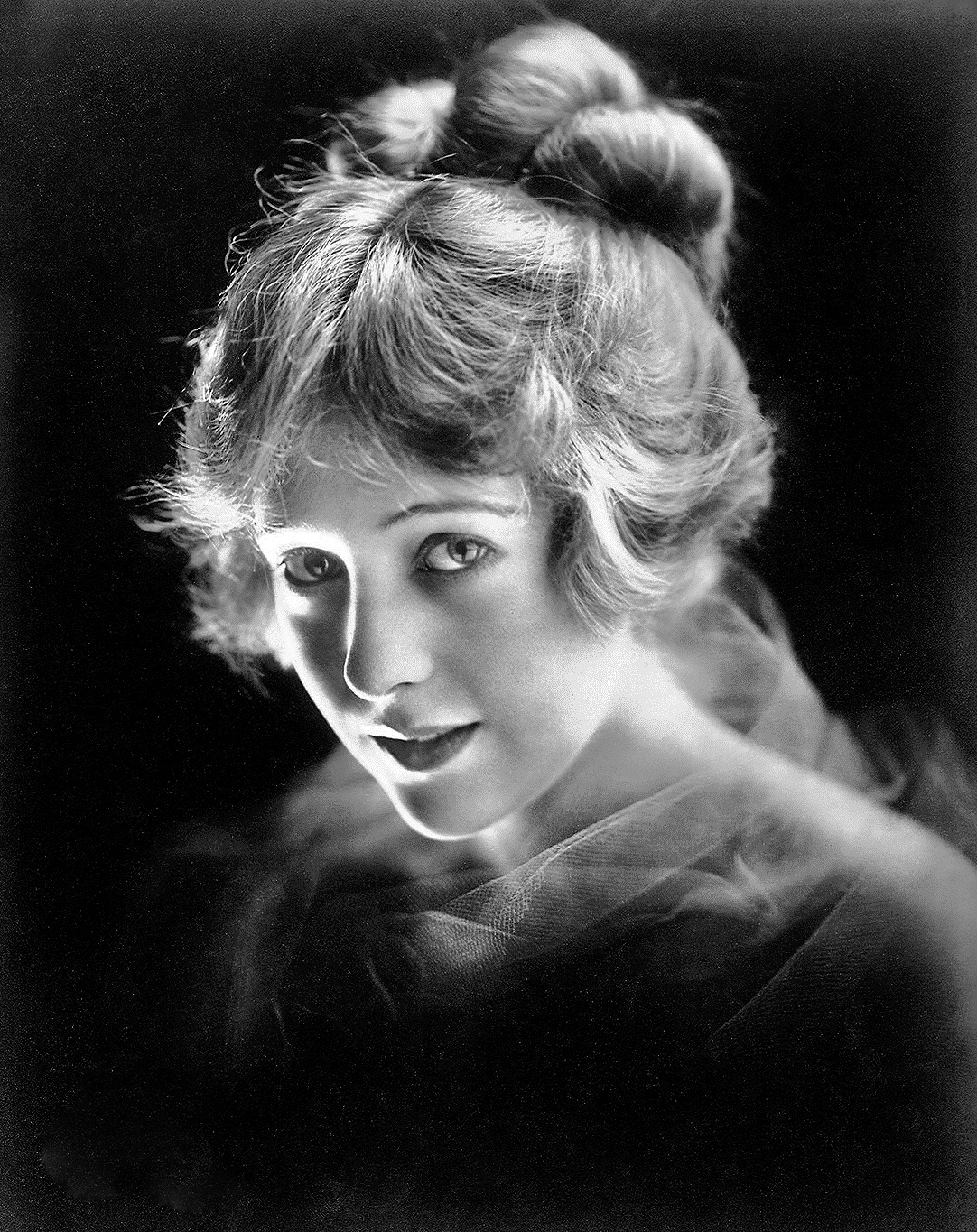
- Carmen in 1916
- Born: Florence Lavina Quick; July 13, 1897; Portland, Oregon, U.S.
- Died: March 4, 1984 (aged 86); El Cajon, California, U.S.
- Other names: Evelyn Quick; Florence La Vinci; Jewell Carman
- Occupation: Actress
- Years active: 1912–1926
- Spouse: Roland West (m. 1918; div. 1938)

Jewel Carmen (born Florence Lavina Quick; July 13, 1897 – March 4, 1984) was an American silent film actress who appeared in over 30 films, primarily in the late 1910s. In addition to her film career, she was involved in several scandals.

Raised in Portland, Oregon, Carmen began acting in Hollywood at age 15, eventually performing with Keystone Studios. She first garnered public attention for her involvement in a statutory rape case against a 35-year-old automobile dealer in Los Angeles, but the charges against him were ultimately dropped after she could not prove her age.

Carmen resumed her career, appearing in several films throughout the 1910s, including a small role in D. W. Griffith's Intolerance (1916), followed by leads in American Aristocracy (1916) with Douglas Fairbanks and in Frank Lloyd's A Tale of Two Cities (1917). She also starred as Cosette in Lloyd's adaptation of Les Misérables (also 1917). In 1918, she married film director Roland West. Carmen made her final film appearance in West's horror film The Bat (1926).

In December 1935, Carmen drew significant media coverage over the death of actress Thelma Todd, who died of carbon monoxide poisoning in the garage of Carmen and West's home in Pacific Palisades. Carmen became embroiled in the investigation after she claimed to have seen Todd on Hollywood Boulevard hours after the time police determined Todd had died. A grand jury ultimately ruled Todd's death accidental. The consensus was that she inadvertently caused her own death by running her car inside the garage to warm herself after West locked her out of the home. Todd and West had been engaged in a romantic affair at the time. Following Todd's death, Carmen and West divorced. She lived the remainder of her life outside the public eye, then died in a nursing home in El Cajon, California in 1984 at age 86.

== Life and career ==
=== 1897–1912: Early life ===
Carmen was born Florence Lavina Quick on July 13, 1897 in Portland, Oregon, (Note: Some contemporaneous sources erroneously report that Carmen was born in Danville, Kentucky, and this has contemporarily been re-published on websites such as the Internet Movie Database and AllMovie. According to census records, Carmen's father was originally from Kentucky, while her mother was raised in Danville, Arkansas, which may potentially account for this confusion. The United States Census of 1910 lists the birthplace of Florence Lavina Quick as Oregon, and in a 1921 newspaper profile, Carmen states that she was born in Portland. Biographer William Donati also corroborates her birthplace as Oregon, not Kentucky.) to Amos William and Minerva Quick. Her father was a native of Kentucky, and her mother was born in Arkansas. Amos worked as a farmer and carpenter to support the family. She had two older sisters, Alice and Edna; one older brother, Fred; one younger sister, Alberta; and a younger brother, Henry. She also had two other sisters, Louella and Florence, both of whom died during her childhood.

Quick spent her early years near Tillamook, Oregon living on a farm before the family returned to Portland in 1900, where she attended Mount Tabor School and St. Mary's Academy. In 1911, Amos left his wife and children to seek work in Los Angeles.

=== 1912–1916: Career beginnings and scandal ===
In February 1912, Quick moved with her mother to Los Angeles, following her father; she aspired to be an actress. Within two weeks, she found work as a film extra for the DeMille Company. Shortly after, her siblings, who had temporarily remained in Portland, also moved to Los Angeles. Quick made her film debut in the 1912 film The Will of Destiny, credited as Florence La Vinci, and subsequently appeared in several films for Keystone Studios, including The Ragtime Band, using the name Evelyn Quick, because the studio mandated performers be age 16 or older, she lied about her age, claiming to be 17. Throughout early 1913, Carmen appeared in minor roles in numerous films for Mack Sennett under this name.

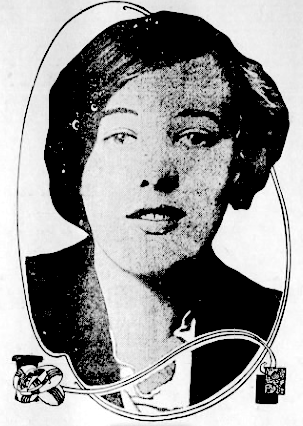
Quick in a 1913 newspaper article about her statutory-rape case

In April 1913, Quick was involved in one of the first major scandals in Hollywood: A grand jury had indicted 35-year-old William La Casse, a wealthy automobile dealer, on charges of statutory rape. La Casse had been investigated over a potential connection to a white slavery ring, but his relationship with a then-15-year-old Quick was uncovered. However, La Casse denied that the two had been intimate. Quick testified against him in court, also implicating William Hollingsworth, a friend of La Casse, in having intimate relations with her. Quick's elder sister Alice also testified that she had witnessed Quick and La Casse together on several occasions. One article covering the case claimed that, during a preliminary examination, it was stated that Quick had been an orphan and was adopted by her parents Amos and Minerva. Because Quick did not possess a birth certificate proving herself a minor, the grand jury attempted to use other means—including sworn testimony from Minerva and the recorded names and birthdates in the Quicks' family Bible—as evidence. However, with the jury lacking sufficient evidence proving Quick's age, and after the failure of two witnesses to appear in court (one of them being Quick), the charges against La Casse were dropped.

Following the scandal, Quick resumed her career in films using the name Jewel Carmen, and she appeared in Daphne and the Pirate (1916) with Lillian Gish and in D. W. Griffith's Intolerance (1916).

=== 1917–1921: Lawsuits against Fox ===
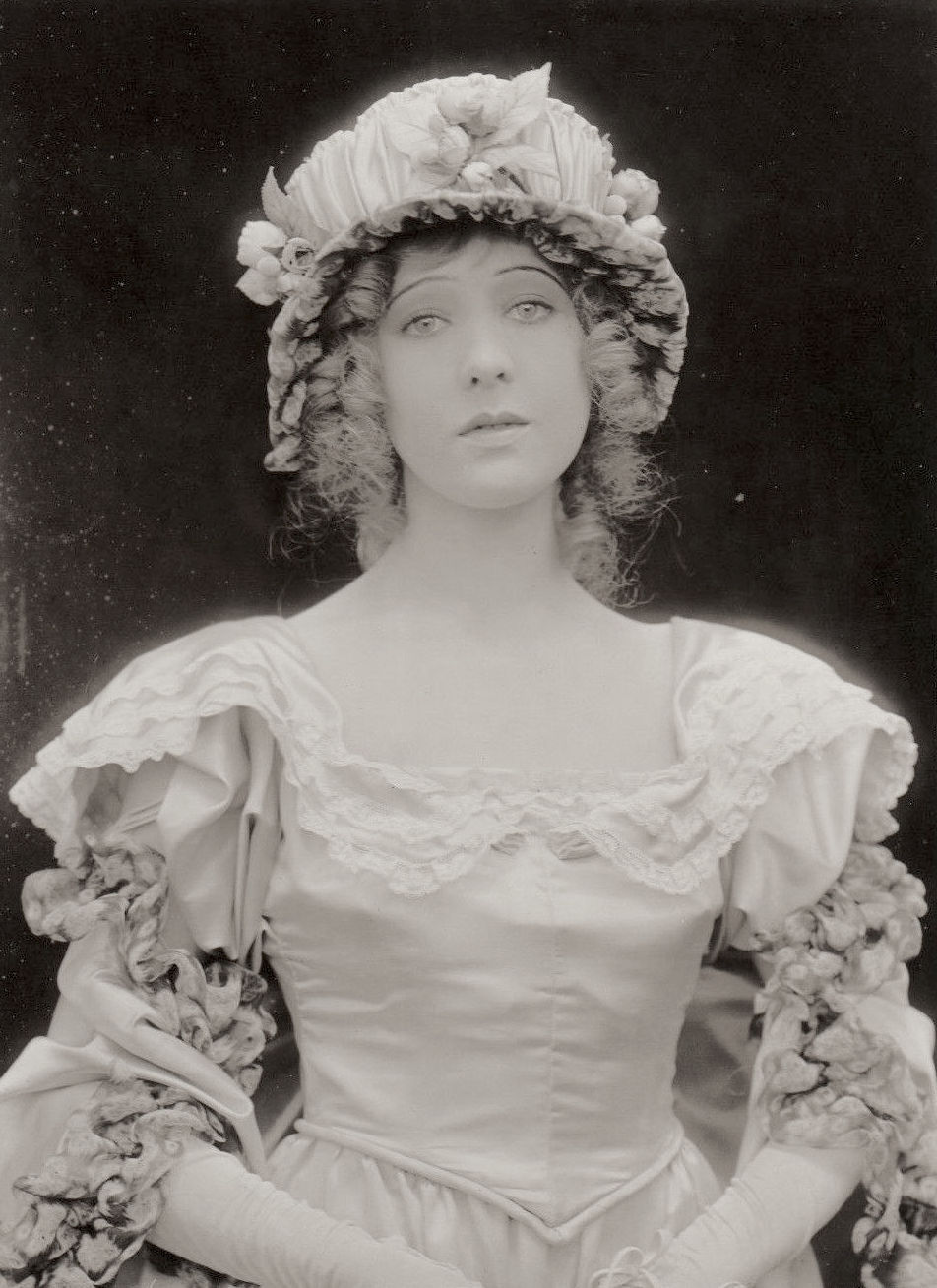
Carmen as Cosette in Les Misérables (1917)

In 1917, Carmen contracted with Fox Film Corporation, but finding the deal unsatisfactory, she started a contract with the Keeney Corporation in 1918 while her first contract remained in effect. Fox sent Keeney notice of its previous contract, warning that it would hold Keeney responsible for assisting her in breaking it and promising to indemnify Keeney against legal retaliation. Carmen launched two lawsuits against Fox, one to attempt to free herself of the obligation of fulfilling her contract and another to seek redress for their interference with her contract with Keeney.

Key to the issues was the question of where the contracts had been made: New York or California. Fox's offices were located in New York; Carmen was a resident of California. By California law, Carmen was an adult when the contract was signed; by New York law, which granted majority at 21, she was not. If not an adult, she could not be legally held to the document she had signed. Although Carmen initially won the first lawsuit, having the contracts set aside and receiving damages of $43,500 from Fox, the decision was overturned on appeal because she had "unclean" hands, having herself treated Fox unfairly. She won her second case because Fox's interference with her employment with Keeney had been outside the law, but Justice Benjamin N. Cardozo made clear that he did not approve of the legal loophole that allowed Carmen to break her contract with Fox.

In the midst of the ongoing lawsuits, Carmen married film director Roland West. West subsequently cast her as the lead of his 1921 film The Silver Lining, in which she portrayed one of two orphaned sisters who is adopted by a thief. She followed it with the drama Nobody, also released in 1921.

=== 1922–1984: Subsequent scandal and retirement ===
Following her marriage, Carmen went into semi-retirement and did not appear in films for five years. She made her final appearance in the horror film The Bat (1926), directed by her husband West.

==== Death of Thelma Todd ====
Carmen later became known for her connection to the scandal surrounding the December 16, 1935 death of actress Thelma Todd. Todd was found deceased from carbon monoxide poisoning in her car, which was parked and running inside the garage of Castillo del Mar, a residence owned by Carmen and West in Pacific Palisades. Castillo del Mar was located one block away from the Thelma Todd Cafe, a restaurant for which Todd served as the face, and which was backed financially by West and owned by Carmen. At the time of Todd's death, Carmen's parents were residing at Castillo del Mar.

There were a number of factors which made the death suspicious, including that Todd allegedly was spotted or spoken to several times the day after she died; Carmen testified before the grand jury that she had seen Todd riding in a phaeton on Hollywood Boulevard around 11:00 p.m. on December 15, hours after police estimated Todd had died. Claims from staff that Todd had been beaten by an unnamed man at the cafe in the days before her death also were investigated by law enforcement.

West was subject to allegations that he had deliberately shut the garage door while an intoxicated Todd was sleeping in her car. However, Todd's death was ruled accidental, inadvertently caused by her own actions. Biographer Hans J. Wollstein notes that the rumors surrounding Todd's death involving Carmen and West mostly had "no foundation whatsoever." Following Todd's death, the marriage between Carmen and West ended, and she retired from the public eye.

== Death ==
Carmen died of lymphoma at Helix View Nursing Home in El Cajon, California on March 4, 1984, age 86.

== Filmography ==
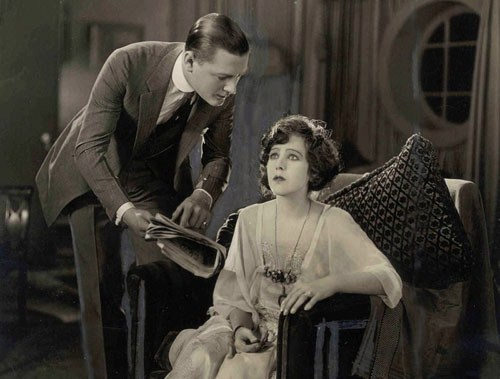
Carmen and Kenneth Harlan in Nobody, 1921

Year	Film	Role	Notes	Ref.
1912	The Will of Destiny	Frances	credited as Florence La Vinci	
1913	Those Good Old Days	Lady in Court	credited as Evelyn Quick	
1913	The Professor's Daughter		credited as Evelyn Quick	
1913	A Strong Revenge	Party Guest	credited as Evelyn Quick	
1913	The Two Widows	Widow	credited as Evelyn Quick	
1913	Wife Wanted	Girl	credited as Evelyn Quick	
1913	Cupid in a Dental Parlor	Ethel Parks	credited as Evelyn Quick	
1913	The New Conductor	Woman on Streetcar	credited as Evelyn Quick	
1913	That Ragtime Band	Girl in Audience	credited as Evelyn Quick	
1913	The Gangsters	Girl	credited as Evelyn Quick	
1913	Professional Jealousy		credited as Evelyn Quick	
1913	He and Himself		credited as Evelyn Quick	
1913	Four Queens and a Jack	The Girl	credited as Evelyn Quick	
1913	Their Husbands		credited as Evelyn Quick	
1916	Daphne and the Pirate		credited as Jewell Carman	
1916	Sunshine Dad	Charlotte		
1916	The Children in the House	Jane Courtenay		
1916	Flirting with Fate	Gladys, the Girl	alternative title: The Assassin	
1916	The Half-Breed	Nellie	alternative title: The Carquinez Woods	
1916	Intolerance	Favorite of the Harem	uncredited	
1916	Manhattan Madness	The Girl		
1916	American Aristocracy	Geraldine Hicks		
1917	The Kingdom of Love	Violet Carson		
1917	A Tale of Two Cities	Lucie Manette		
1917	American Methods	Claire de Beaulieu		
1917	To Honor and Obey	Rose Delvane		
1917	The Conqueror	Eliza Allen		
1917	When a Man Sees Red	Captain Sutton		
1917	Les Misérables	Cosette at age 18		
1918	The Girl with the Champagne Eyes	Nellie Proctor		
1918	The Bride of Fear	Ann Carter		
1918	Confession	Mary Anderson		
1918	Fallen Angel	Jill Cummings	alternative title: Paying the Piper	
1918	Lawless Love	LaBelle Geraldine	alternative title: Above the Law	
1921	The Silver Lining	The Angel		
1921	Nobody	Little Mrs. Smith		
1926	The Bat	Miss Dale Ogden		

== Sources ==
- Donati, William (2000). Ida Lupino: A Biography. Lexington, Kentucky: University Press of Kentucky. ISBN 0-8131-0982-5.
- Donati, William (2014). The Life and Death of Thelma Todd. Jefferson, North Carolina: McFarland. ISBN 978-0-786-48817-9.
- Field, Richard H.; Kaplan, Benjamin; Clermont, Kevin M. (2007). Civil Procedure- Materials for a Basic Course. New York: Foundation Press. ISBN 978-1-59941-145-3.
- Kaufman, Andrew L. (1998). Cardozo. Cambridge, Massachusetts: Harvard University Press. ISBN 0-674-09645-2.
- Langman, Larry; Finn, Daniel (1994). A Guide to American Silent Crime Films. Westport, Connecticut: Greenwood Press. ISBN 978-0-313-28858-6.
- Lefler, Timothy Dean (2016). Mabel Normand: The Life and Career of a Hollywood Madcap. Jefferson, North Carolina: McFarland. ISBN 978-1-476-62307-8.
- Lowe, Denise (2014). An Encyclopedic Dictionary of Women in Early American Films: 1895-1930. New York: Routledge. ISBN 978-1-317-71896-3.
- Nash, Jay Robert (2004). Great Pictorial History of World Crime. Lanham, Maryland: Rowman & Littlefield. ISBN 1-928831-22-2.
- Rich, Burdett A.; Wailes, M. Blair, eds. (1921). American Law Reports Annotated. Vol. 15. Rochester, New York: Lawyers Co-operative Publishing Company.
- Vazzana, Eugene Michael (2001). Silent Film Necrology (2nd ed.). Jefferson, North Carolina: McFarland. ISBN 978-0-786-41059-0.
- Walker, Brent E. (2013). Mack Sennett's Fun Factory: A History and Filmography of His Studio and His Keystone and Mack Sennett Comedies, with Biographies of Players and Personnel. Jefferson, North Carolina: McFarland. ISBN 978-0-786-47711-1.
- Wright, David (2002). Joyita: Solving the Mystery. Auckland, New Zealand: Auckland University Press. ISBN 1-86940-270-7.
