= The Master Key (1914 serial) =

1914 film

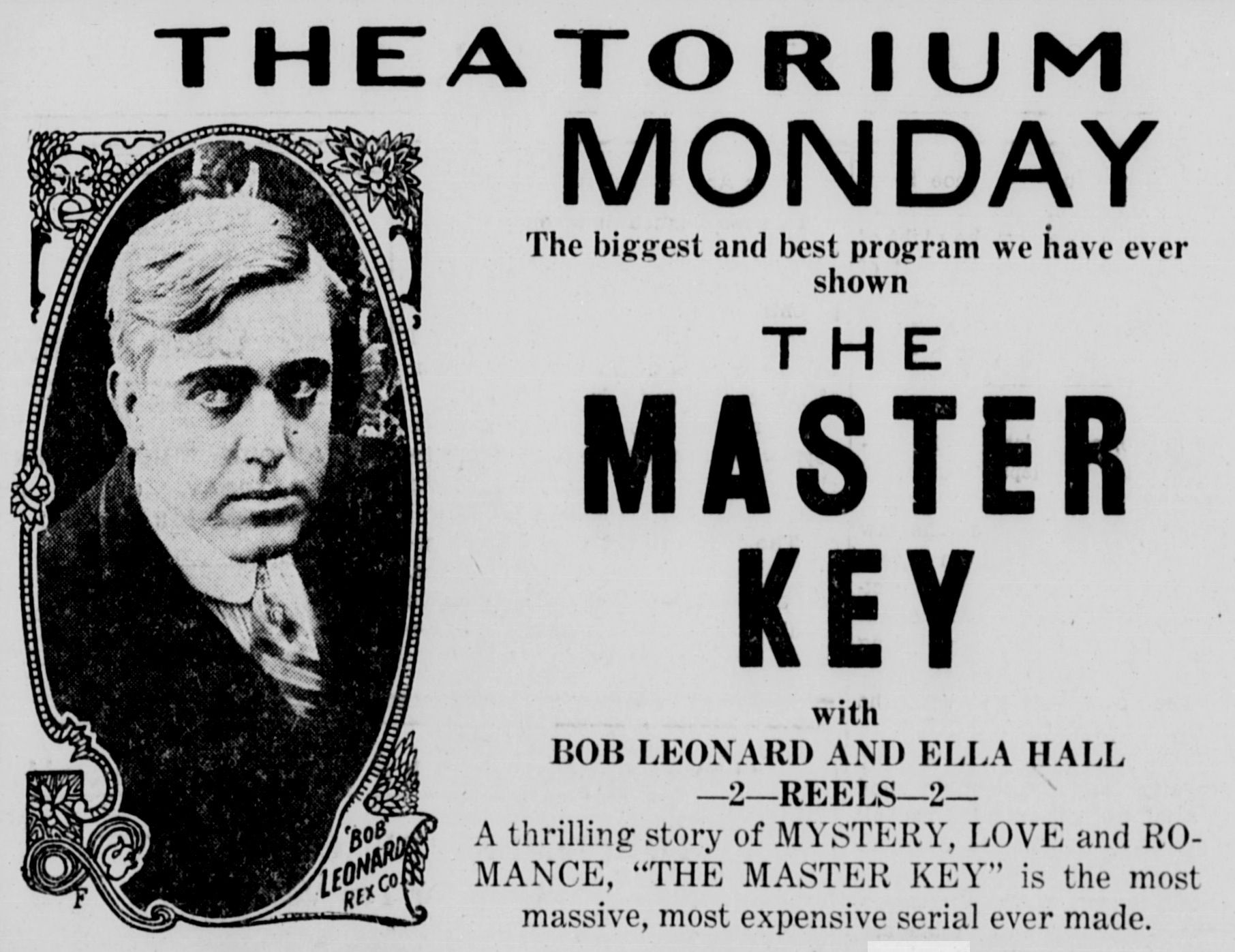
- Advertisement in 1914 newspaper
- Directed by: Robert Z. Leonard
- Written by: Robert Z. Leonard; John Fleming Wilson
- Based on: The Master Key by John Fleming Wilson
- Starring: Robert Z. Leonard; Ella Hall; Harry Carter
- Distributed by: Universal Film Manufacturing Co.
- Release date: November 16, 1914
- Running time: 15 episodes
- Country: United States
- Language: Silent (English intertitles)

The Master Key is a 1914 American silent film serial directed by Robert Z. Leonard. It is considered to be lost, with only episode 5 of 15 surviving in the Library of Congress. In parallel with the weekly film releases, Universal Film offered newspaper a print serial work illustrated with stills from the film. These were complied into a "photo-play" edition of The Master Key published by Grosset & Dunlap in 1915.

== Cast ==
- Robert Z. Leonard as John Dore
- Ella Hall as Ruth Gallon
- Harry Carter as Harry Wilkerson
- Jean Hathaway as Jean Darnell
- Alfred Hickman as Charles Everett
- Wilbur Higby as Tom Gallon
- Charles Manley as Tom Kane
- Jack Holt as Donald Faversham
- Jim Corey as Wah Sing
- Allan Forrest
- Mack V. Wright
- Rupert Julian
- Cleo Madison
- Edward A. Mills
- James Robert Chandler (credited as Robert Chandler)
- Marc Robbins
