= J. Herbert Frank =

American actor (1885–1926)

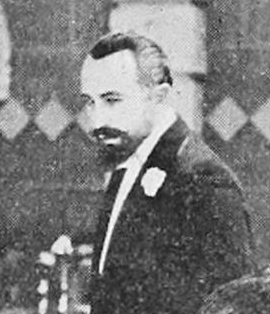
- Frank in Dodging A Million, 1918
- Born: May 12, 1885; New York City, US
- Died: March 7, 1926 (aged 40); Los Angeles, California, US
- Occupation: Actor
- Years active: 1914-1924

J. Herbert Frank (May 12, 1885 – March 7, 1926) was an American actor of the silent era and on stage. He appeared in more than 50 films between 1914 and 1924. He was sometimes billed as Herbert Frank. Frank was born in Manhattan, New York City.

On Broadway, he performed in ""Don Juan (1921) and La Belle Paree / Bow-Sing / Tortajada (1911).

He died on March 7, 1926, in Los Angeles, California by committing suicide in his apartment using chloroform and gas. According to the Oakland Tribune, Frank had previously been involved in narcotic investigations surrounding the death of Wallace Reid, and killed himself to avoid a trial on charges of creating a disturbance.

In 1922, in response to allegations, Frank denied knowing Wallace Reid.

== Selected filmography ==
- The Battle of Frenchman's Run (1915)
- Destruction (1915)
- The Moonshiners (1916)
- The Crucial Test (1916)
- Ashes of Embers (1916)
- Darkest Russia (1917)
- The Iron Ring (1917)
- The End of the Tour (1917)
- The Secret of the Storm Country (1917)
- The Brand of Satan (1917)
- Scandal (1917) as Sutherland Yorke
- Dodging a Million (1918)
- Good-Bye, Bill (1918)
- The Sheriff's Oath (1920)
- April Folly (1920)
- The Silver Lining (1921)
- Winners of the West (1921)
- Nobody (1921)
- In the Days of Buffalo Bill (1922) as Abraham Lincoln
- Up and at 'Em (1922)
- Jazzmania (1923)
- Your Friend and Mine (1923)
