= Amelia Summerville =

American actress

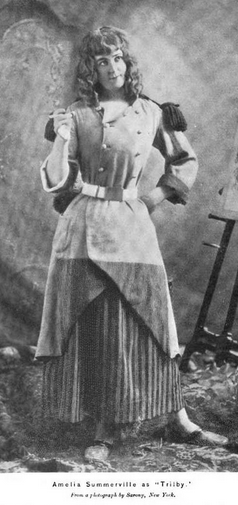
- Amelia Summerville in costume for Trilby, from an 1895 publication.
- Born: Amelia M. Shaw; 15 October 1862; County Kildare, Ireland
- Died: 21 January 1934 (aged 71); New York City, U.S.
- Years active: 1867–1925

Amelia Summerville (born Amelia Shaw, 15 October 1862 – 21 January 1934) was an Irish-born American stage and silent film actress.

== Biography ==
Summerville was born in County Kildare, Ireland and migrated to Toronto, Ontario, Canada as a child. She first appeared on stage at the age of 7 in an operetta in Toronto.

In 1884, Summerville appeared in her first leading role in the musical Adonis. She originated the role of Rosetta, the Mountain Maid.

Summerville appeared in fourteen Broadway plays from 1885 to 1925. She also performed in silent films during the 1910s and 1920s.

Summerville took an interest in dieting and claimed to have lost 100 pounds (45 kg) in three months, from 249 pounds (113 kg) to 149 pounds (68 kg). She authored Why be Fat?: Rules for Weight-reduction and the Preservation of Youth and Health (1916). She was a fan of corned beef hash and stale bread.

In 1920 she was named chairman of the New York Women's State Democratic Committee.

She fell on ice on January 3, 1934, and died on January 21 of her injuries.

== Partial filmography ==
- Mrs. Dane's Defense (1918)
- How Could You, Caroline? (1918)
- Getting Mary Married (1919)
- The Probation Wife (1919)
- My Little Sister (1919)
- The Witness for the Defense (1919)
- April Folly (1920)
- Romance (1920)
- Romola (1924)
- The Great Deception (1926)

== Publications ==
- Why Be Fat?: Rules for Weight-Reduction and the Preservation, of Youth and Health (1916)
- The Speaking Voice (1927)
