= American Methods =

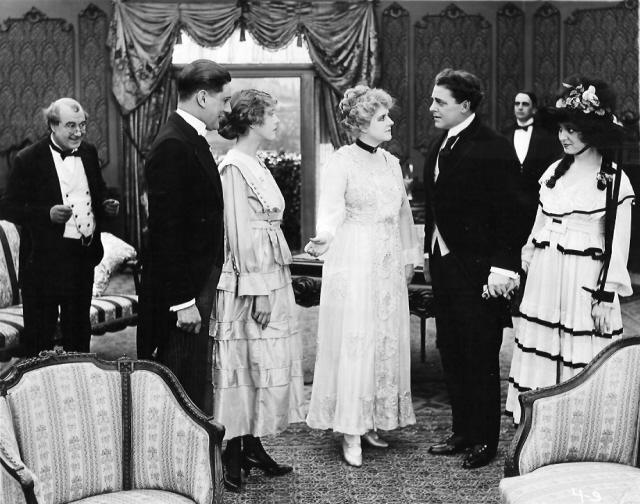
- Directed by: Frank Lloyd
- Written by: Frank Lloyd; Georges Ohnet (story); F. McGrew Willis
- Produced by: William Fox
- Starring: William Farnum; Jewel Carmen; Bertram Grassby
- Cinematography: William C. Foster
- Production company: Fox Film
- Distributed by: Fox Film
- Release date: April 30, 1917
- Running time: 60 minutes
- Country: United States
- Languages: Silent; English intertitles

American Methods is a lost 1917 American silent drama film directed by Frank Lloyd and starring William Farnum, Jewel Carmen and Bertram Grassby.

== Plot ==
Of French ancestry, William Armstrong inherits an iron mine located in France. Accompanied by his sister, Betty, he travels to Europe to assume management of the enterprise. In the same village resides Claire, daughter of the Marquis de Beaulieu, alongside her mother and her brother Octave, who is betrothed to Gaston de Bligny, a local nobleman of distinguished lineage but limited means.

Upon learning that the de Beaulieu family has lost its fortune, Gaston promptly terminates his engagement to Claire and instead marries Marie Moulinet, an affluent daughter of the prosperous businessman. In the wake of this betrayal, Claire consents to marry William, who has been profoundly enamored with her since their first encounter. Meanwhile, Betty attracts the romantic attentions of Octave.

Despite his new marital commitment, Gaston continues to pursue Claire, ultimately professing his enduring love for her. Their clandestine interaction is discovered by William, precipitating a confrontation in which Gaston, in a fit of rage, draws a firearm upon him. William, however, disarms Gaston and fatally turns the weapon against him. This tragic incident prompts Claire to recognize the depth of William’s devotion; overcome with remorse for her earlier superficiality, she earnestly seeks his forgiveness.

== Cast ==
- William Farnum as William Armstrong
- Jewel Carmen as Claire de Beaulieu
- Bertram Grassby as Gaston - Duc de Bligny
- Willard Louis as M. Moulinet
- Lillian West as Marie Moulinet
- Genevieve Blinn as Marquise de Beaulieu
- Allan Forrest as Octave de Beaulieu
- Florence Vidor as Betty Armstrong
- Mortimer Jaffe as Jimmy
- Marc B. Robbins as Henri Gaudet
- Josef Swickard as Baron de Prefont

== Preservation ==
With no holdings located in archives, American Methods is considered a lost film.

== Bibliography ==
- Solomon, Aubrey. The Fox Film Corporation, 1915-1935: A History and Filmography. McFarland, 2011.
