= The Eagle's Wings =

1916 silent film

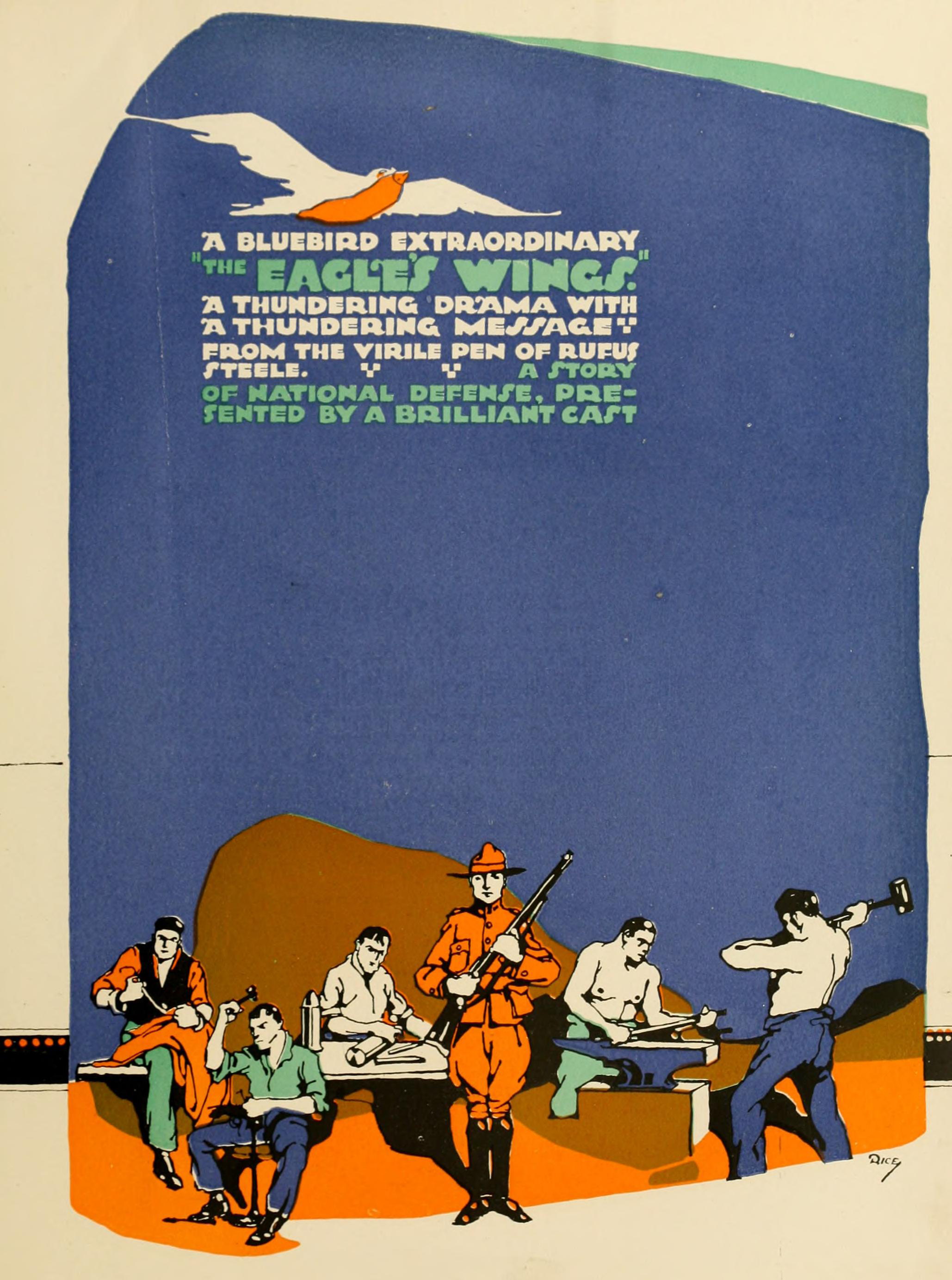
- Directed by: Robert Z. Leonard
- Written by: Maud Grange; Rufus Steele
- Starring: Grace Carlyle; Vola Vale; Herbert Rawlinson
- Cinematography: R.E. Irish
- Production company: Universal Pictures
- Distributed by: Universal Pictures
- Release date: December 4, 1916
- Running time: 50 minutes
- Country: United States
- Languages: Silent; English intertitles

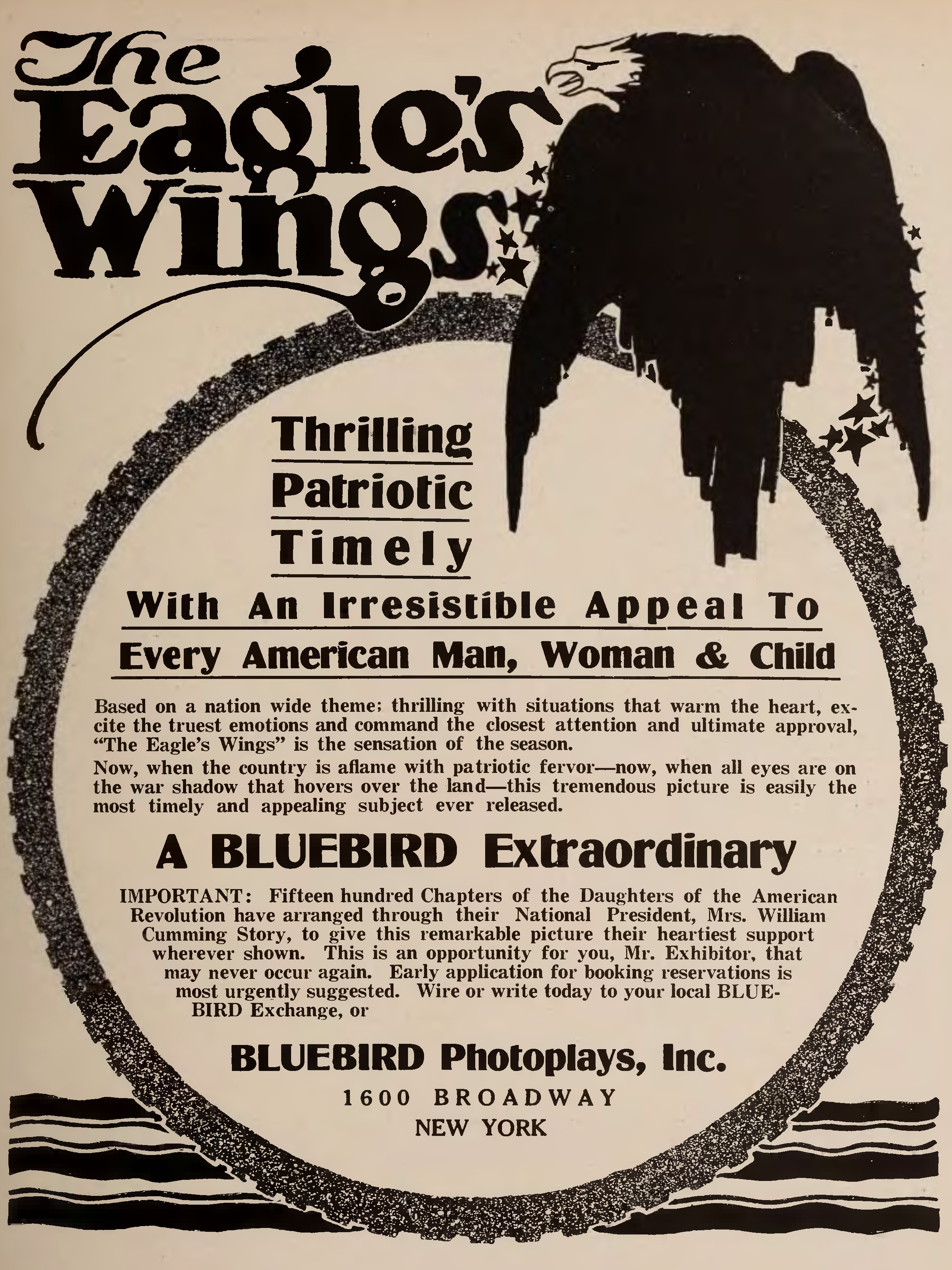
"The Eagle's Wings" film ad from, Moving Picture Weekly, 1917

The Eagle's Wings is a 1916 American silent drama film directed by Robert Z. Leonard and starring Grace Carlyle, Vola Vale and Herbert Rawlinson.

== Cast ==
- Grace Carlyle as Mona Wright
- Vola Vale as Kitty Miles
- Herbert Rawlinson as Richard Wallace
- Charles Hill Mailes as Senator Wright
- Rodney Ronous as Jefferson Maynard
- Charles Gunn as Orlin Dagore
- Albert MacQuarrie as Keron Theris
- Malcolm Blevins as James Brown
- Walter Belasco as Foreign Ambassador

== Bibliography ==
- Codori, Jeff. Film History Through Trade Journal Art, 1916-1920. McFarland, 2020.
