= Grace Carlyle =

American actress

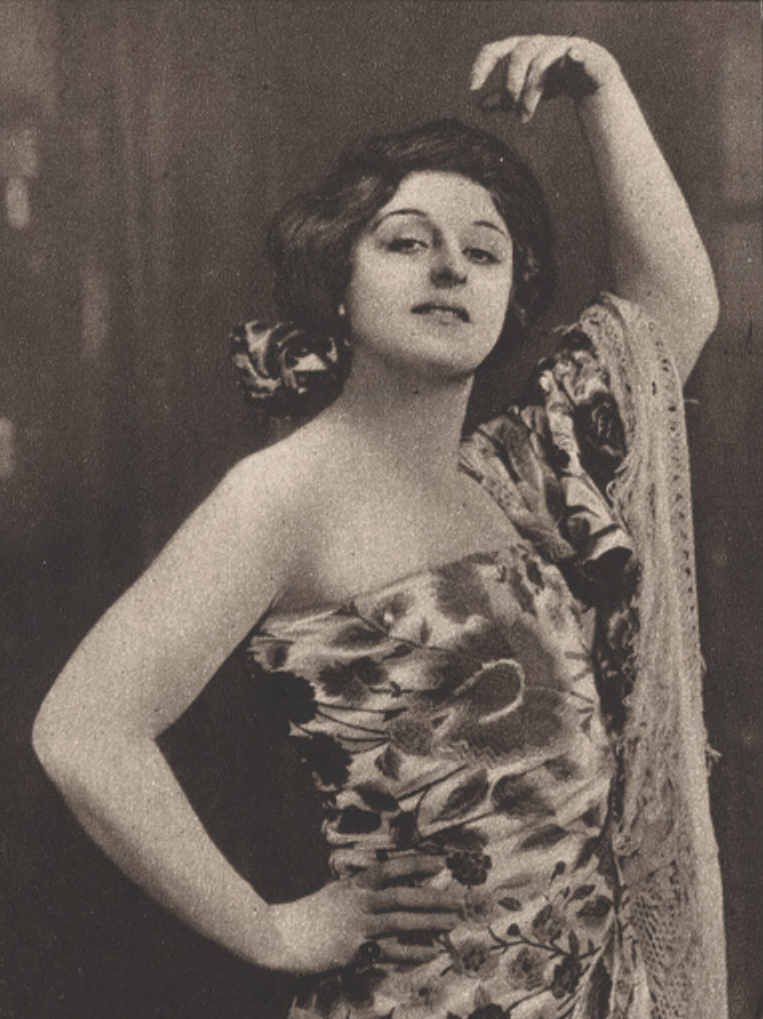
- Carlyle in 1917
- Occupation: Actress

Grace Carlyle was an American actress who performed on both stage and film in the early 20th century. She had a career in Broadway shows from 1909 through 1925. She also appeared in silent films released between 1913–1927. She was still active on the stage as late as 1929.

== Life and career ==
Grace Carlyle was born in Richmond, Virginia, and spent part of her youth in Orlando and Jacksonville, Florida. Her stage debut was with the Belasco Stock Company in Los Angeles.

In 1909 Carlyle made her Broadway debut as Miss Sadie Adams in Sir Arthur Conan Doyle's The Fires of Fate at the Liberty Theatre. In 1910 she appeared as Tilly in Gustav Kadelburg's The Girl He Couldn't Leave Behind Him at the Garrick Theatre. That same year she returned to the Garrick Theatre in two more plays; portraying Isabelle in Percy MacKaye's Anti-Matrimony and Mrs. Owen in Leonard Merrick and Michael Morton's The Imposter. The latter play had a cast led by Annie Russell. In 1911-1912 she portrayed the role of Lucienne de Jussy in Pierre Wolff's The Marionettes at the Lyceum Theatre. She returned to Broadway as Madeleine Giroux in Dario Niccodemi and Michael Morton's The Prodigal Husband at the Empire Theatre in 1914.

Carlyle performed the role of Lady Dorothy Nugent in Hall Caine's Margaret Schiller which was produced by Charles Frohman and Klaw & Erlanger at the New Amsterdam Theatre in 1916. She appeared as Frances Granger Willard Mack and Lou Tellegen's Blind Youth at the Theatre Republic in 1917. In 1918 she appeared in multiple plays on Broadway; portraying Lela Trevor in Oliver D. Bailey and Lottie Meaney's A Stitch in Time at the Fulton Theatre, Constance in Ada Patterson and Robert Edeson's Love's Lightning at the Lexington Theatre, and Laura Webb in Anne Crawford Flexner's The Blue Pearl at the Longacre Theatre.

In 1921 she performed the role of Drusilla Willis in Forrest Rutherford's Her Salary Man at the Cort Theatre. In 1925 she portrayed Jean Steadman in J. Palmer Parsons' White Gold at Broadway's Lenox Little Theatre. That same year she starred as Countess Castiglione in Harry B. Smith's operetta The Love Song which fictionalized the life of Jacques Offenbach. It ran at the Century Theatre from January 13, 1925 through June 6, 1925.

In 1929 she was a member of the Fulton Players, a theatre troupe in residence at the Fulton Theatre in Oakland, California.

== Selected filmography ==
- The Fight Against Evil (1913)
- Genesis: 4-9 (1913)
- In the Wilds of Africa (1913)
- Just In Time (1913)
- The Little Skipper (1913)
- The Eagle's Wings (1916)
- An International Marriage (1916)
- The Place Beyond the Winds (1916)
- Please Help Emily (1917)
- My Wife (1918)
- Bringing Up Betty (1919)
- Held to Answer (1923)
- Trimmed in Scarlet (1923)
- The Fast Set (1924)
- By Divine Right (1924)
- Wine (1924)
- Shameful Behavior? (1926)
- The Notorious Lady (1927)
- Lonesome Ladies (1927)
- She's My Baby (1927)
- Uncle Tom's Cabin (1927)

== Notes and references ==
=== Bibliography ===
- Bordman, Gerald (1995). American Theatre: A Chronicle of Comedy and Drama, 1930-1969. Oxford University Press. ISBN 9780195090789.
- Braff, Richard E. (2002). The Braff Silent Short Film Working Papers: Over 25,000 Films, 1903–1929, Alphabetized and Indexed. McFarland & Co. ISBN 9780786410316.
- Dietz, Dan (2019). The Complete Book of 1920s Broadway Musicals. Rowman & Littlefield Publishers. ISBN 9781442245280.
- Hischak, Thomas S. (2009). Broadway Plays and Musicals: Descriptions and Essential Facts of More Than 14,000 Shows through 2007. McFarland & Company. ISBN 978-0786497546.
- Mantle, Burns, ed. (1922). The Best Plays of 1921-1922. Dodd, Mead & Co.
- Mantle, Burns, ed. (1926). "Solid Ivory". The Best Plays of 1925-26 and the Year Book of the Drama in America. Dodd, Mead & Co.
- Munden, Kenneth W., ed. (1971). The American Film Institute Catalog of Motion Pictures Produced in the United States: Feature Films 1921–1930. R.R. Bowker Company. OCLC 664500075.
