= The Girl Who Ran Wild =

1922 film directed by Rupert Julian

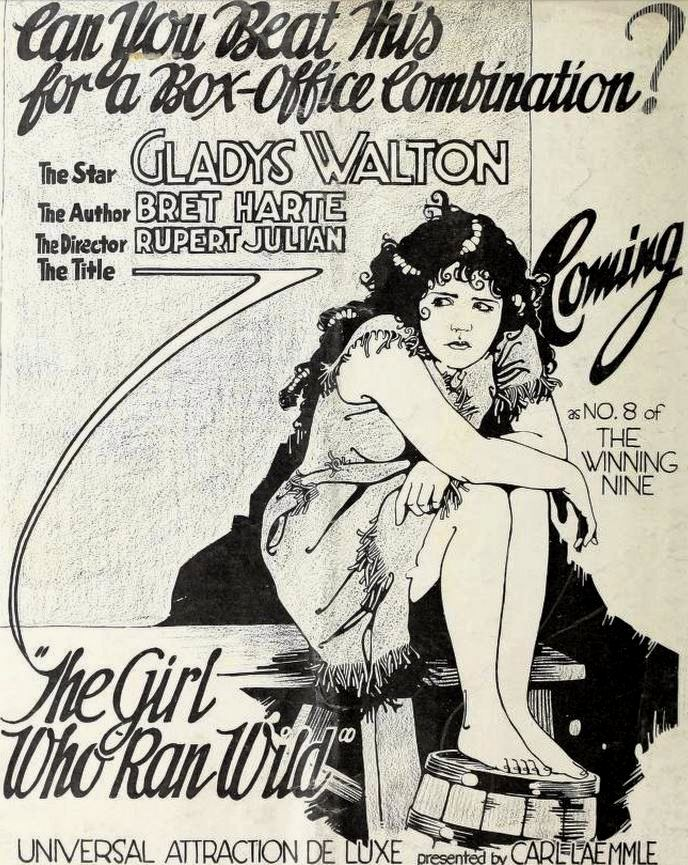
- Trade advertisement
- Directed by: Rupert Julian
- Written by: Rupert Julian (scenario); George C. Hull (titles)
- Based on: M’liss: An Idyll of Red Mountain by Bret Harte
- Starring: Gladys Walton; Marc Robbins; Vernon Steele
- Cinematography: Allen M. Davey
- Production company: Universal Film Manufacturing Company
- Distributed by: Universal Film Manufacturing Company
- Release date: October 9, 1922
- Running time: 5 reels
- Country: United States
- Language: Silent (English intertitles)

The Girl Who Ran Wild is a 1922 American comedy-drama film directed by Rupert Julian. It is a black and white silent film released by Universal which is based on the 1863 novella M’liss: An Idyll of Red Mountain by Bret Harte. It is a remake of the 1918 film M’Liss. The film was written by George C. Hull and features cast such as Gladys Walton (as M’liss), Marc Robbins (“Bummer” Smith), and Vernon Steele (The Schoolmaster). It is a western melodrama which was released on October 9, 1922. It was filmed in Seven Oaks, California.

== Plot ==
As described in a film magazine, Melissa Bummer, whom everyone called "Old Man Bummer's Wildcat," told the world that she could take care of herself after her Dad died and left her alone in a shack in the hills. Shabbily clad, barefoot, her hair knotted and uncombed, M'Liss scorned the girls from the city who had Mamas and always had ribbons in their hair. But this was before the new Schoolmaster came, and she began to realize how sadly ignorant she was. Of course, he was handsome and well groomed. M'Liss was not surprised by that, but she could believe her ears when he told her that he loved her and wanted her to go away with him. The little wildcat of the mountains began to earnestly study her textbooks, to wear becoming clothes supplied by her two guardians, and awoke to all that she had been missing before in her solitary existence in her father's shack. One thing that M'Liss did not have to learn in school was the winsome ways of a maid to win a man. This is where her eternal feminine cropped out to beat the village belle to the goal.

== Cast ==
- Gladys Walton as M'liss
- Marc Robbins as 'Bummer' Smith
- Vernon Steele as The Schoolmaster
- Joseph J. Dowling as Calaveras John (credited as Joseph Dowling)
- William Burress as Johnny Cake
- Al Hart as Preacher
- Nelson McDowell as Deacon McSnagley
- Lloyd Whitlock as Jack Velvet
- Lucille Ricksen as Clytie

== Preservation ==
In February 2021, The Girl Who Ran Wild was cited by the National Film Preservation Board on their Lost U.S. Silent Feature Films list.
