= Lawless Love =

1918 film

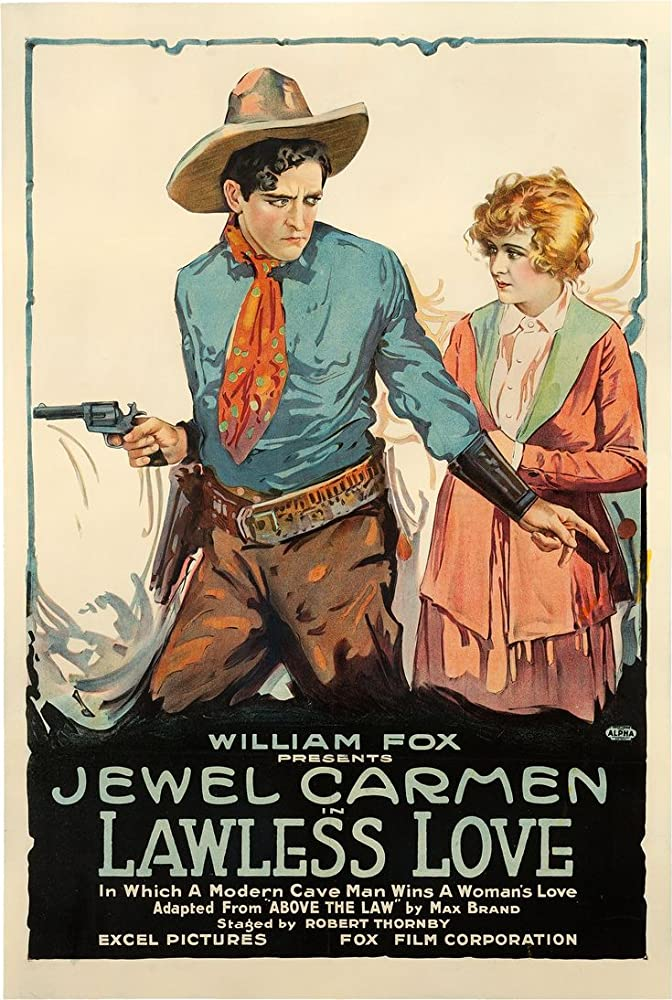
- Directed by: Robert Thornby
- Written by: Olga Printzlau
- Based on: a short story Above the Law by Max Brand(aka Frederick Schiller Faust)
- Produced by: William Fox
- Starring: Jewel Carmen
- Cinematography: Frank Good
- Distributed by: Fox Film Corporation
- Release date: August 23, 1918
- Running time: 5 reels
- Country: United States
- Languages: Silent; English intertitles

Lawless Love is a lost 1918 silent film western drama directed by Robert Thornby and starring Jewel Carmen. It was produced and distributed by te Fox Film Corporation.

== Cast ==
- Jewel Carmen as LaBelle Geraldine
- Henry Woodward as Black Jim
- Edward Hearn as Freddie Montgomery
