= The Bride of Fear =

1918 film by Sidney Franklin

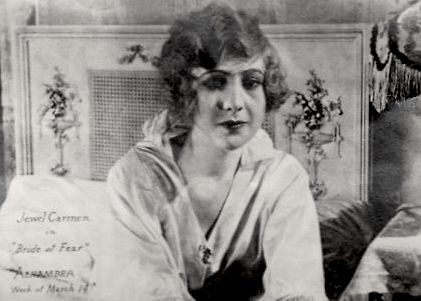
- Carmen in a publicity photo
- Directed by: Sidney Franklin
- Written by: Sidney Franklin; Bennett Cohn
- Starring: Jewel Carmen; Charles Gorman; Lee Shumway
- Cinematography: Dev Jennings
- Production company: Fox Film Corporation
- Release date: April 7, 1918
- Running time: 50 minutes
- Country: United States
- Language: Silent (English intertitles)

The Bride of Fear is a 1918 American silent drama film directed by Sidney Franklin and starring Jewel Carmen, Charles Gorman, and Lee Shumway. Its plot follows a distraught, suicidal woman who is wooed by a violent criminal.

== Cast ==
- Jewel Carmen as Ann Carter
- Charles Gorman as Hayden Masters
- Lee Shumway as Donald Sterling
- Charles Bennett as Martin Sterling

== Reception ==
The Los Angeles Times praised the film as a "clean-cut, sane, well-acted and engaging little story." The Tuscaloosa News also praised the film for its "striking" opening scene, ultimately deeming the film a "gripping tale with a smashing finish."
