= April Folly =

1920 film

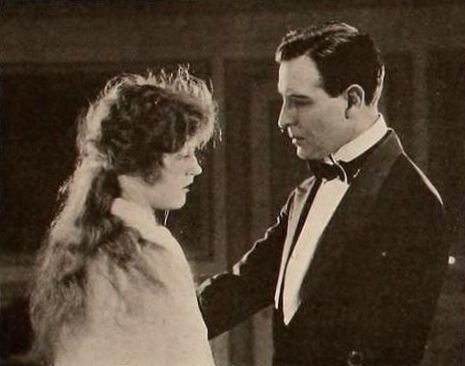
- Still with Marion Davies and Conway Tearle
- Directed by: Robert Z. Leonard
- Screenplay by: Adrian Johnson; Cynthia Stockley
- Produced by: Marion Davies
- Starring: Marion Davies; Madeline Marshall; Hattie Delaro; Amelia Summerville; Conway Tearle; J. Herbert Frank; Warren Cook
- Cinematography: Allen G. Siegler
- Production companies: Marion Davies Film Corporation; Cosmopolitan Productions; International Film Service
- Distributed by: Paramount Pictures
- Release date: March 21, 1920
- Running time: 50 minutes
- Country: United States
- Language: Silent (English intertitles)

April Folly is a 1920 American silent drama film directed by Robert Z. Leonard and written by Adrian Johnson and Cynthia Stockley. The film stars Marion Davies, Madeline Marshall, Hattie Delaro, Amelia Summerville, Conway Tearle, J. Herbert Frank, and Warren Cook. The film was released on March 21, 1920, by Paramount Pictures.

== Plot ==
As described in a film magazine, April Poole, a young writer in love with publisher Kerry Sarle, visits the office of Mr. Sarle and his partner Ronald Kenna and reads her latest story to them. She has made Sarle the hero, Kenna the villain, and herself the heroine. In the story, April changes places with Lady Diana Mannister, who is being sent to South Africa to separate her from her lover, a young artist. A famous diamond that Lady Diana is to deliver at the end of her journey is given to April. Thieves trail her during her journey. With efforts by Kenna to steal the diamond prevented by the intervention of Sarle, the story comes to a close.

== Cast ==
- Marion Davies as April Poole
- Madeline Marshall as Lady Diana Mannister
- Hattie Delaro as Mrs. Stanislaw
- Amelia Summerville as Olive Connal
- Conway Tearle as Kerry Sarle
- J. Herbert Frank as Ronald Kenna
- Warren Cook as Earle of Mannister
- Spencer Charters as Dobbs
- Charles Peyton as Butler
- Agnes Neilson

Newspaper ad for the film and details of the contest.

== Promotional contest ==
Cosmopolitan Productions offered a $1,000 prize for the "best short scenario suitable for Miss Davies", similar to the story in April Folly. "Write a clean, wholesome love story with an entertaining series of incidents and a good moral. Tell the story in a straightforward way -no florid writing". The contest was judged by "Marion Davies, Cosmopolitan Productions' star; William LeBaron, the distinguished playwright, and Hay Long, editor-in-chief of the International Magazine Company".

== Production ==
In her eighth film, Marion Davies starred in this adventure film as a woman in disguise in order to deliver a fabulous diamond to its owner. The unusual narrative format has Davies as a writer named April Poole, telling her editor the story. What we see is the story she tells. The main action is framed by Davies talking with her editor. Production stalled when the original director was replaced by Robert Z. Leonard. Co-star Conway Tearle threatened to leave the project because of the extended filming time.

== Status ==
A limited-edition DVD was released by Edward Lorusso with a music score by Ben Model in April 2017.
