= Daphne and the Pirate =

1916 film

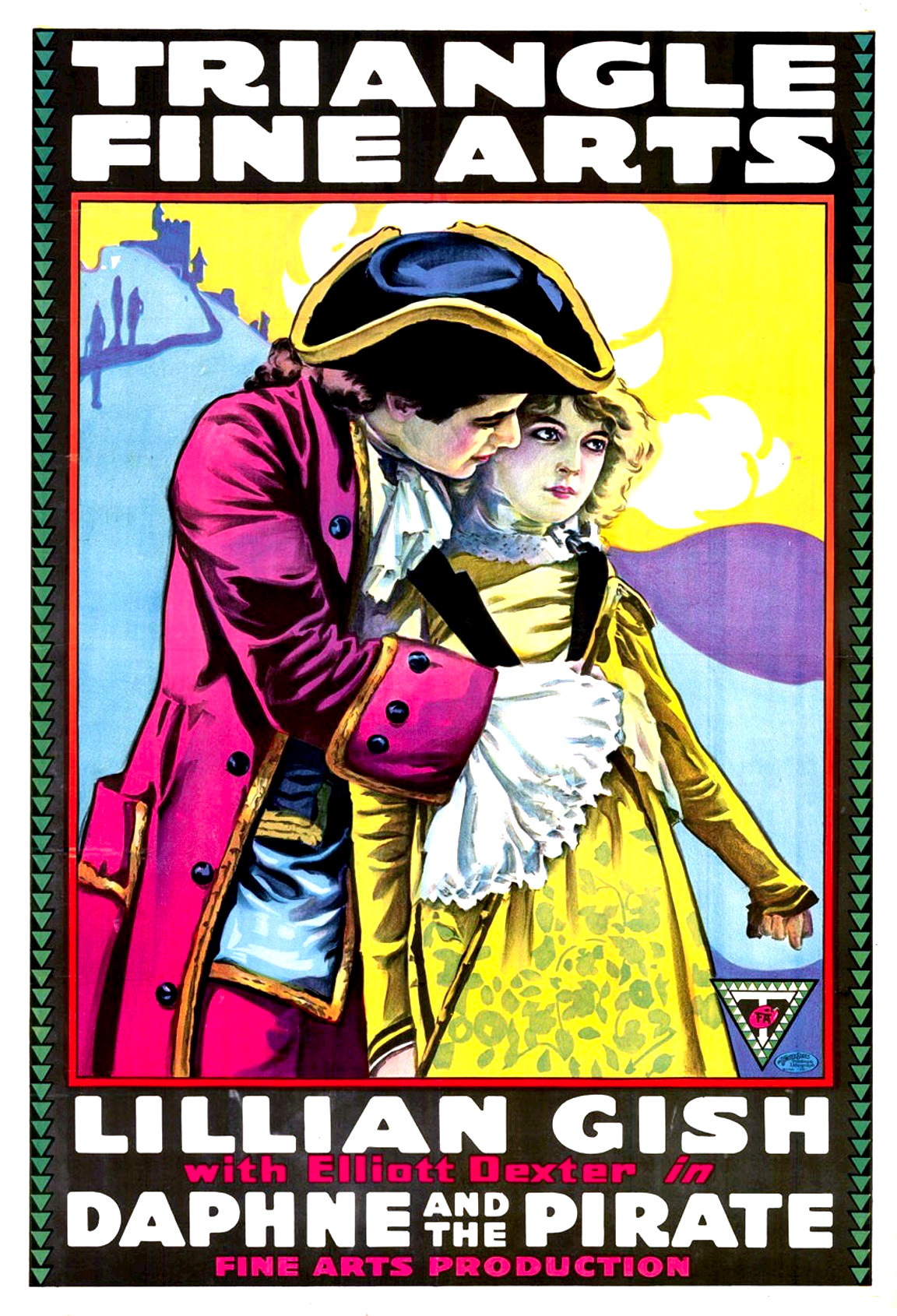
- Theatrical poster
- Directed by: Christy Cabanne
- Written by: D. W. Griffith (as Granville Warwick)
- Starring: Lillian Gish
- Cinematography: William Fildew
- Distributed by: Triangle Film Corporation
- Release date: March 5, 1916
- Running time: 50 minutes
- Country: United States
- Languages: Silent; English intertitles

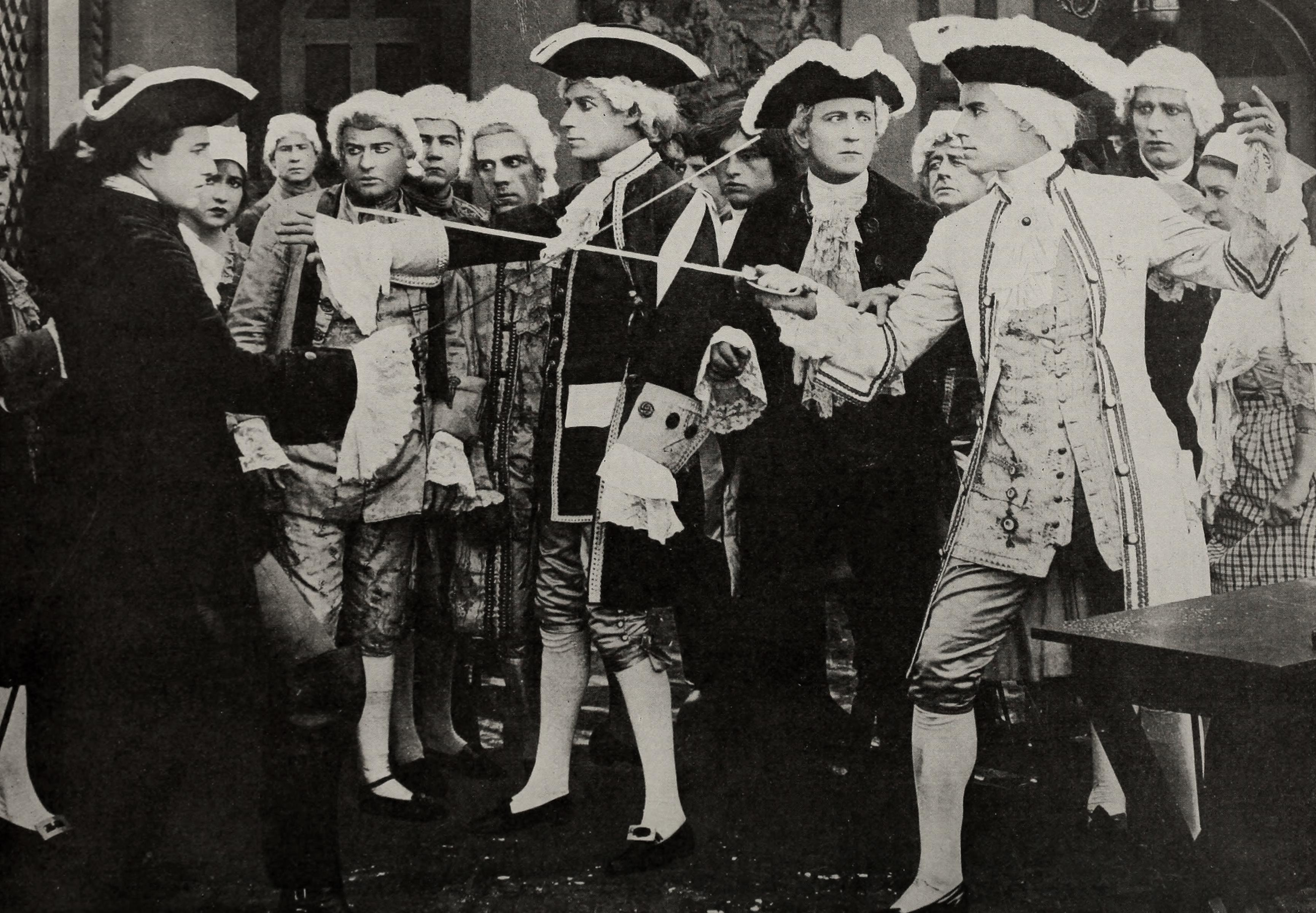
Scene from the film.

Daphne and the Pirate is a 1916 American drama film directed by Christy Cabanne and starring Lillian Gish.

== Cast ==
- Lillian Gish as Daphne La Tour
- Elliott Dexter as Philip de Mornay
- Walter Long as Jamie d'Arcy
- Howard Gaye as Prince Henri
- Lucille Young as Fanchette
- Richard Cummings as Francois La Tour
- Jack Cosgrave as Duc de Mornay
- Joseph Singleton
- George C. Pearce (as George Pearce)
- W. E. Lawrence
- Pearl Elmore
- Jewel Carmen (as Jewell Carman)

== See also ==
- Lillian Gish filmography
