= Wine (1924 film) =

1924 film

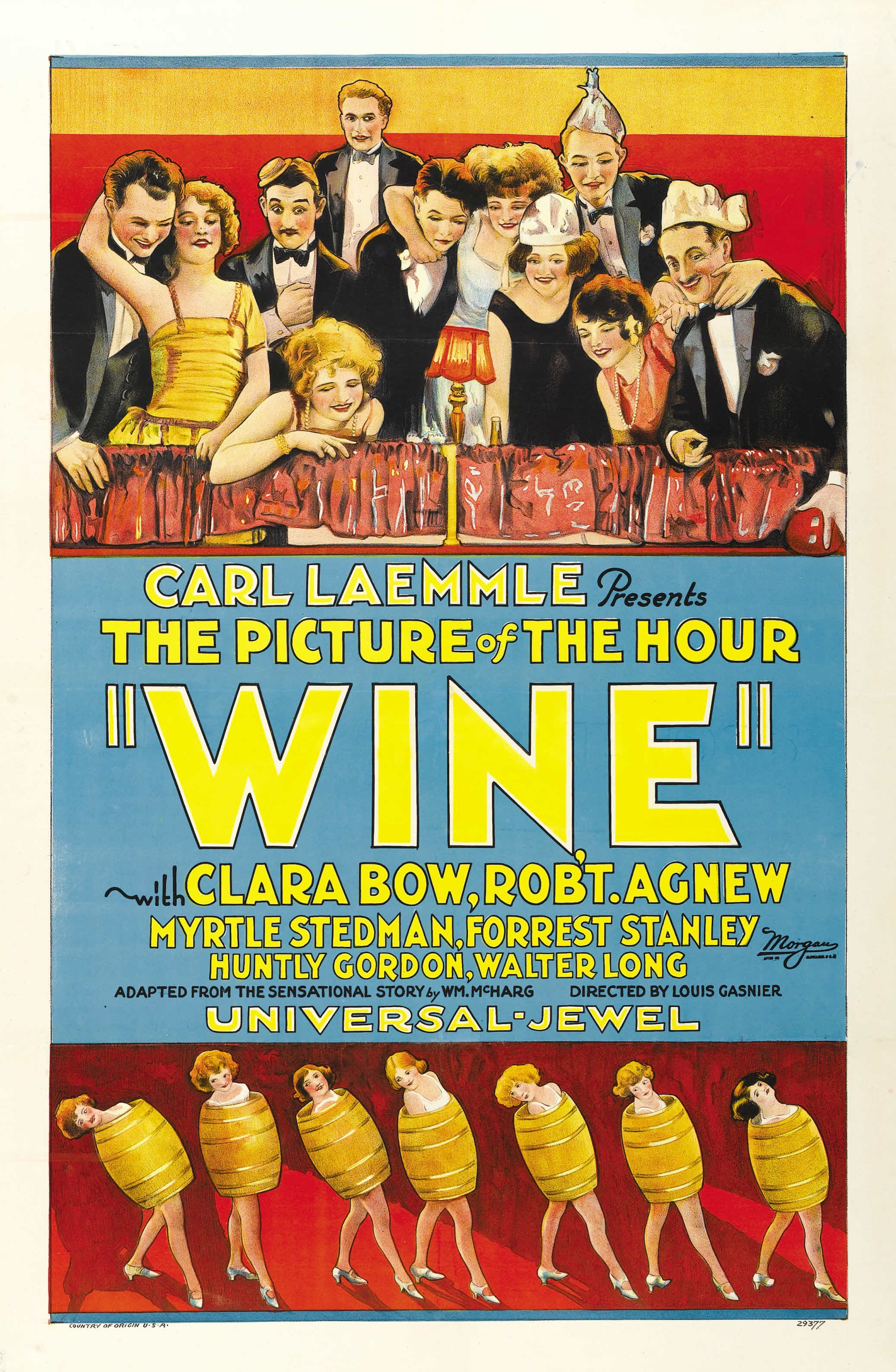
- Directed by: Louis J. Gasnier
- Written by: Raymond L. Schrock (adaptation)
- Screenplay by: Philip Lonergan; Eve Unsell
- Based on: Wine by William Briggs MacHarg
- Produced by: Carl Laemmle
- Starring: Clara Bow; Forrest Stanley; Myrtle Stedman; Huntley Gordon
- Cinematography: John Stumar
- Edited by: Harold McLernon
- Distributed by: Universal Jewel
- Release date: August 31, 1924
- Running time: 70 mins.
- Country: United States
- Language: Silent (English intertitles)

Wine is a 1924 American silent melodrama film directed by Louis J. Gasnier, produced and released by Universal Pictures under their 'Jewel' banner. The film, which featured Clara Bow in her first starring role, is currently classified as lost.

== Plot ==
During the Prohibition Era, the widespread liquor traffic in the upper-classes is exposed. Angela is an innocent girl who develops into a "wild redhot mama".

== Cast ==
- Clara Bow as Angela Warriner
- Forrest Stanley as Carl Graham
- Huntley Gordon as John Warriner
- Myrtle Stedman as Mrs. Warriner
- Robert Agnew as Harry Van Alstyne
- Walter Long as Benedict, Count Montebello
- Arthur Thalasso as Amoti
- Walter Shumway as Revenue officer
- Grace Carlyle as Mrs. Bruce Corwin
- Leo White as The Duke
- Winifred Landis as Dowager (uncredited)

== Reviews ==
- "If not taken as information, it is cracking good entertainment", Carl Sandburg reviewed September 29.
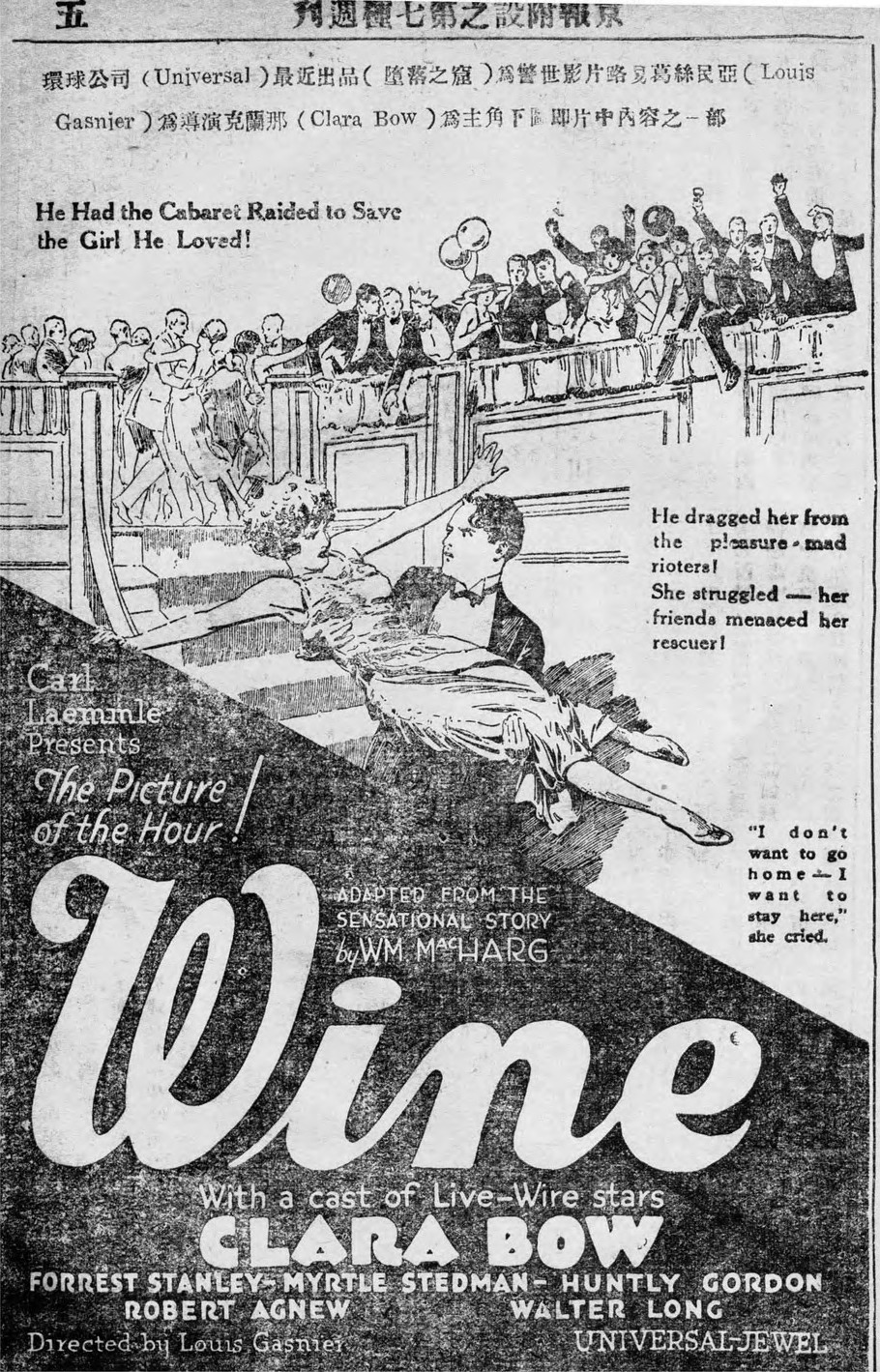
- Bilingual Wine ad in Chinese "Screen Weekly" (January 1925)
  "Don't miss Wine. It's a thoroughly refreshing draught ... there are only about five actresses who give me a real thrill on the screen – and Clara is nearly five of them", Grace Kingsley in The Los Angeles Times August 24.

== See also ==
- List of lost films
