= Nobody (1921 film) =

1921 silent film

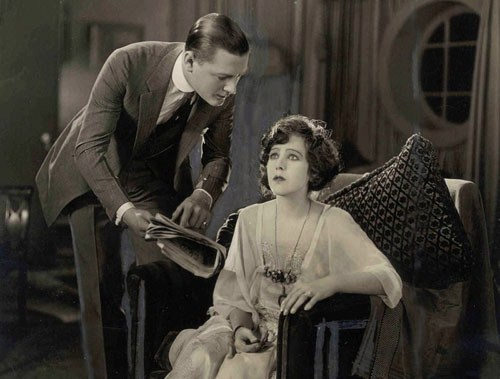
- Directed by: Roland West
- Written by: Charles Henry Smith; Roland West
- Produced by: Roland West
- Starring: Jewel Carmen; William B. Davidson; Kenneth Harlan
- Cinematography: Harry Fischbeck
- Production company: Roland West Productions
- Distributed by: First National Pictures
- Release date: July 24, 1921
- Running time: 70 minutes
- Country: United States
- Languages: Silent; English intertitles

Nobody is a 1921 American silent mystery film directed by Roland West and starring Jewel Carmen, William B. Davidson and Kenneth Harlan.

== Cast ==
- Jewel Carmen as Little Mrs. Smith
- William B. Davidson as John Rossmore
- Kenneth Harlan as Tom Smith
- Florence Billings as Mrs. Fallon
- J. Herbert Frank as Hedges
- Grace Studdiford as Mrs. Rossmore
- George Fawcett as Hiram Swanzey
- Lionel Pape as Noron Ailsworth
- Henry Sedley as Rossmore's Secretary
- Ida Darling as Mrs. Van Cleek
- Charles Wellesley as Clyde Durand
- William De Grasse as Rossmore's Skipper
- Riley Hatch as The 'Grouch' Juror

== Bibliography ==
- Munden, Kenneth White. The American Film Institute Catalog of Motion Pictures Produced in the United States, Part 1. University of California Press, 1997.
