= Secret Love (1916 film) =

1916 film

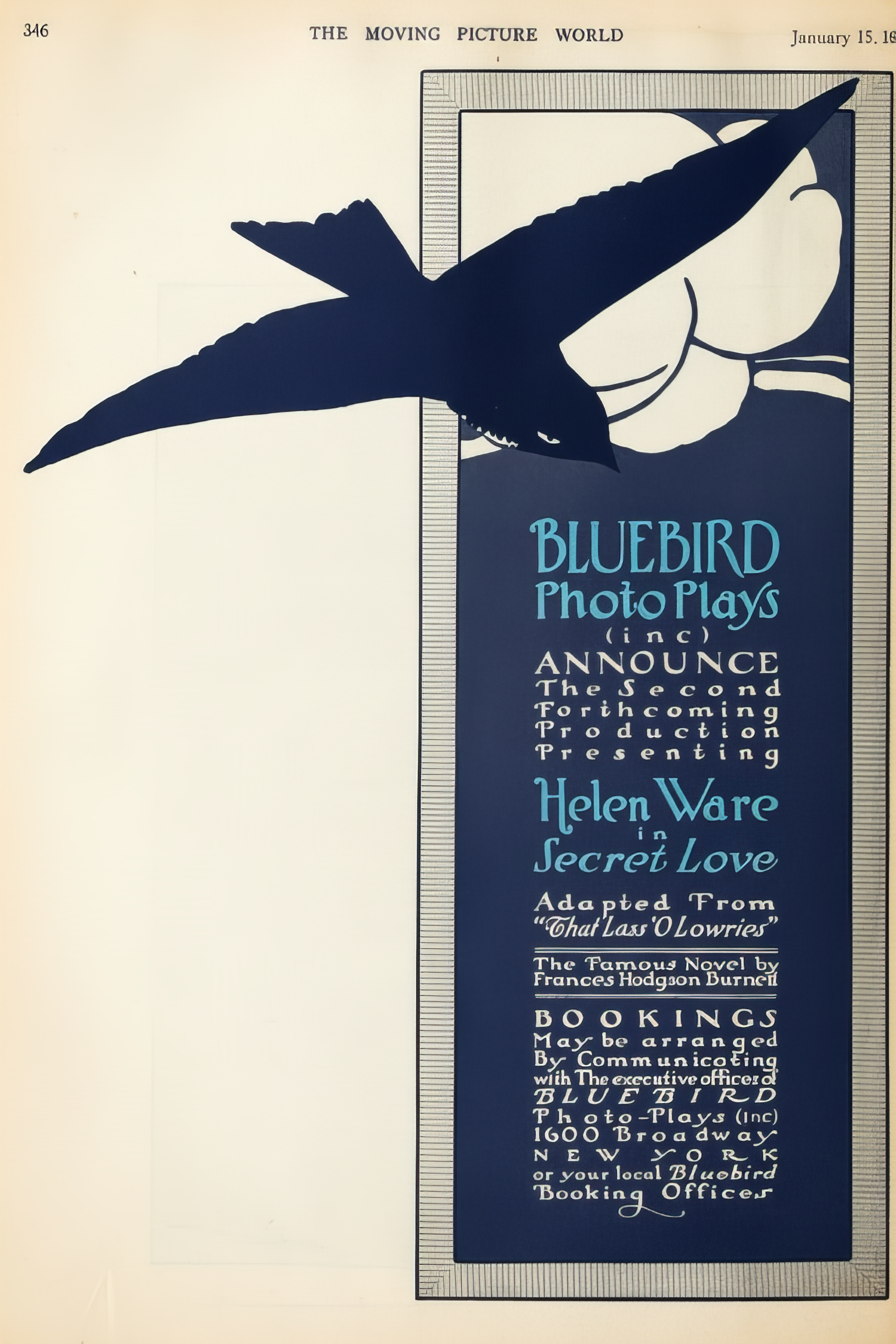
- Directed by: Robert Z. Leonard
- Written by: Frances Hodgson Burnett; Robert Z. Leonard
- Produced by: Universal's "Bluebird Photoplays" unit
- Starring: Harry Carey
- Distributed by: Universal Pictures
- Release date: January 31, 1916
- Country: United States
- Languages: Silent; English intertitles

Secret Love is a 1916 American silent drama film directed by Robert Z. Leonard and featuring Harry Carey. This is the first film made under Universal's "Bluebird" banner. A copy of this film survives at the Library of Congress, in nitrate form.

== Cast ==
- Jack Curtis as Don Lowrie
- Helen Ware as Joan Lowrie
- Dixie Carr as Liz (credited as Dixey Carr)
- Harry Carey as Fergus Derrick
- Harry Carter as Ralph Lonsdale
- Marc Robbins as The Rector
- Harry Southard as Paul Grace
- Warren Ellsworth as Mine Foreman
- Ella Hall as Arnice
- Willis Marks as Craddock
- Lule Warrenton as Mother
