= Roland West =

American film director

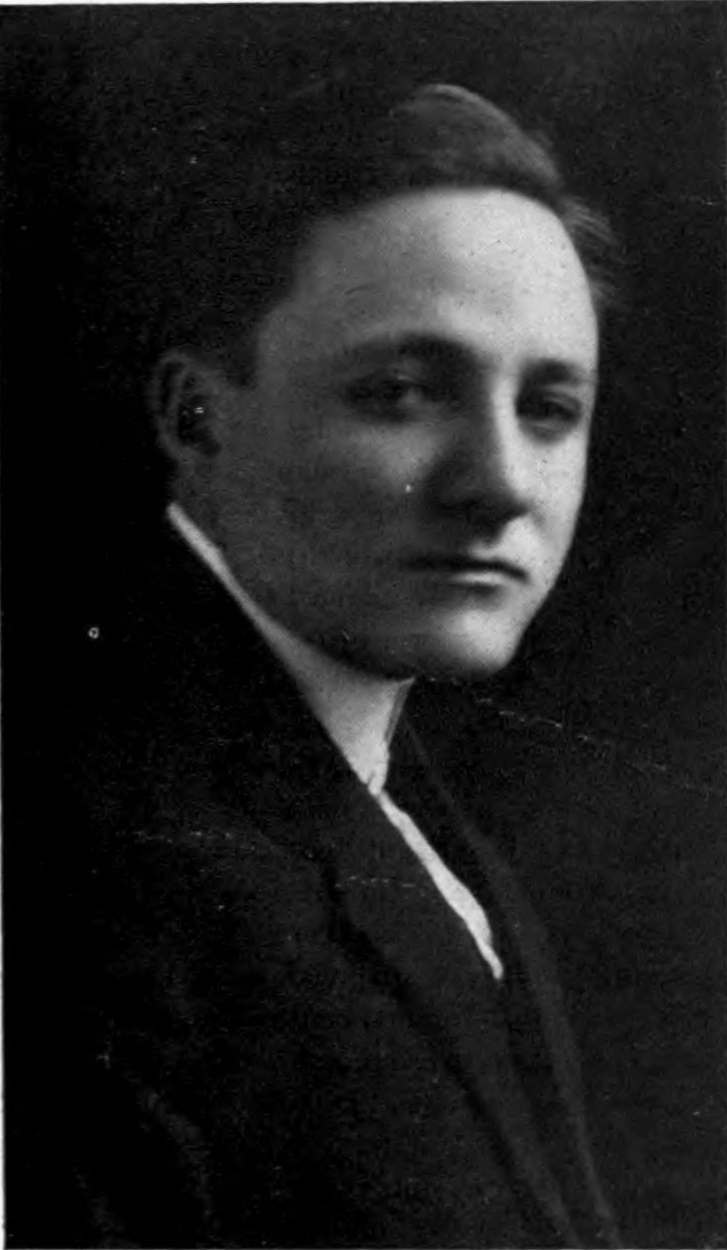
- Born: Roland Van Zimmer; February 20, 1885; Cleveland, Ohio, U.S.
- Died: March 31, 1952 (aged 67); Santa Monica, California, U.S.
- Occupation: Film director
- Known for: Suspect in death of Thelma Todd
- Spouses: Jewel Carmen (m. 1918; div. 1938) Lola Lane (m. 1946)

Roland West (February 20, 1885 – March 31, 1952) was an American film director, known for his innovative proto–film noir movies of the 1920s and early 1930s. He is however best known for his possible involvement in the death of Hollywood actress Thelma Todd in 1935.

== Biography ==
Born Roland Van Zimmer to a theatrical family in Cleveland, Ohio, he began acting in vaudeville productions as a teenager. By his early 20s, he was writing and directing vaudeville productions.

Shortly afterward, he began directing films such as The Monster (1925) with Lon Chaney; The Bat (1926), based on the novel by Mary Roberts Rinehart (dramatized on stage by Rinehart and Avery Hopwood); Alibi (1929), for which he nominated for Academy Award for Best Picture; The Bat Whispers (1930) (also based on the Rinehart novel and play); and Corsair (1931).

So established was West by 1930 that The Bat Whispers was billed on posters as Roland West's The Bat Whispers. However, he made only one more film in his career.

Roland West's first wife was actress Jewel Carmen, although the two became estranged, and West began a longtime affair with actress Thelma Todd. Following Todd's death in 1935 and his divorce from Carmen in 1938, he married actress Lola Lane some time after June 25, 1946, and remained married to her until his death in 1952.

Following Todd's death and his divorce, West rarely worked and withdrew into virtual seclusion. In the early 1950s, his health began to decline, and he suffered a stroke and a nervous breakdown. He died in Santa Monica, California, in 1952, aged 67. The third season of TV show True Detective features a character named Roland West, speculated to be a tribute to the director.

== Death of Thelma Todd ==
West has long been considered a murder suspect in many conspiracy theories due to the unusual circumstances surrounding the death of his mistress, actress Thelma Todd. Todd and West began their affair shortly after meeting on a yachting excursion to Catalina Island in 1930. The two became business partners and moved in next door to each other at 17575 Pacific Coast Highway, Pacific Palisades, California. Their relationship was described as volatile, and West was described as being controlling and possessive.

In December 1935, Todd was found dead in her car which was inside the garage of Jewel Carmen, Roland West's wife, who lived on the Todd estate near where West and Todd resided. An autopsy concluded that she died of accidental carbon monoxide poisoning caused by the exhaust of her car. Some conspiracy buffs have suggested that Todd was murdered by West aboard his yacht, the Joyita. This theory states that he then planted her body in her garage to be found later and staged the scene to resemble an accident. The Joyita gained further notoriety in 1955 when its entire complement of 25 passengers and crew went missing in the South Pacific.

No evidence concerning allegations against West has surfaced, and neither he nor anybody else was charged with any crime surrounding Todd’s death, although he was asked to testify for a grand jury investigation into the death. However, the bad publicity surrounding his alleged involvement in Thelma Todd's death hurt his reputation and largely overshadowed his film work.

== Filmography ==
- A Woman's Honor (1916)
- Lost Souls (1916)
- The Siren (1917)
- De Luxe Annie (1918)
- The Silver Lining (1921)
- Nobody (1921)
- The Unknown Purple (1923)
- Driftwood (1924)
- The Monster (1925)
- The Bat (1926)
- The Dove (1927)
- Alibi (1929)
- The Bat Whispers (1930)
- Corsair (1931)

== Sources ==
- John Wakeman, ed. (1987). World Film Directors, Volume One, 1890-1945. New York: The H.W. Wilson Company. pp. 1194–1197.
