= American Aristocracy =

1916 comedy-drama film by Lloyd Ingraham

- Film online
- Directed by: Lloyd Ingraham
- Story by: Anita Loos
- Starring: Douglas Fairbanks; Jewel Carmen
- Cinematography: Victor Fleming
- Production company: Fine Arts Film Company
- Distributed by: Triangle Film Corporation
- Release date: November 12, 1916
- Running time: 52 minutes
- Country: United States
- Languages: Silent; English intertitles

American Aristocracy is a 1916 American silent adventure/comedy-drama film directed by Lloyd Ingraham and starring Douglas Fairbanks. A 35mm print of the film is preserved at the George Eastman House and is currently in the public domain.

== Cast ==
- Douglas Fairbanks as Cassius Lee
- Jewel Carmen as Geraldine Hicks
- Charles DeLima as Leander Hicks
- Albert Parker as Percy Horton
- Artie Ortego as Delgado
