= The End of the Tour (1917 film) =

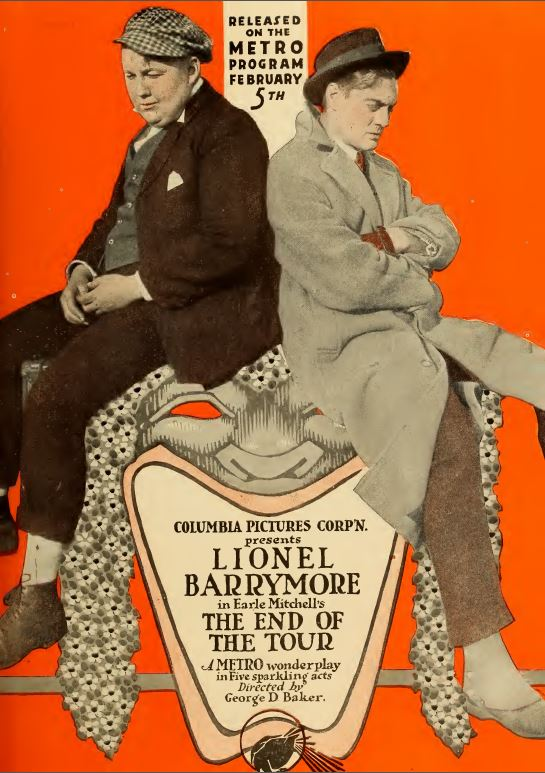
- Advertisement for the film
- Directed by: George D. Baker
- Starring: Lionel Barrymore
- Cinematography: Arthur Martinelli
- Production company: Columbia Film Company
- Distributed by: Metro Pictures
- Release date: January 29, 1917
- Running time: 5 reels
- Country: United States
- Language: Silent (English titles)

The End of the Tour is a 1917 silent film directed by George D. Baker and starring Lionel Barrymore. It was distributed by Metro Pictures.

It is a lost film.

== Cast ==
- Lionel Barrymore – Byron Bennett
- Ethel Dayton – Grace Jessup
- Frank Currier – Col. Jessup
- Walter Hiers – "Skinny" Smith
- J. Herbert Frank – Percy Pennington
- Richard Thornton – "Solly" Harris
- Maud Hill – Hattie Harrison
- Kate Blancke – Mrs. Ryan
- Hugh Jeffrey – Lester Montague
- Mary Taylor – Lottie Lee
- Charles Eldridge – Seth Perkins
- William Harvey – Hen Springer
- Louis Wolheim
- Hal Wilson
