= A Tale of Two Cities (1917 film) =

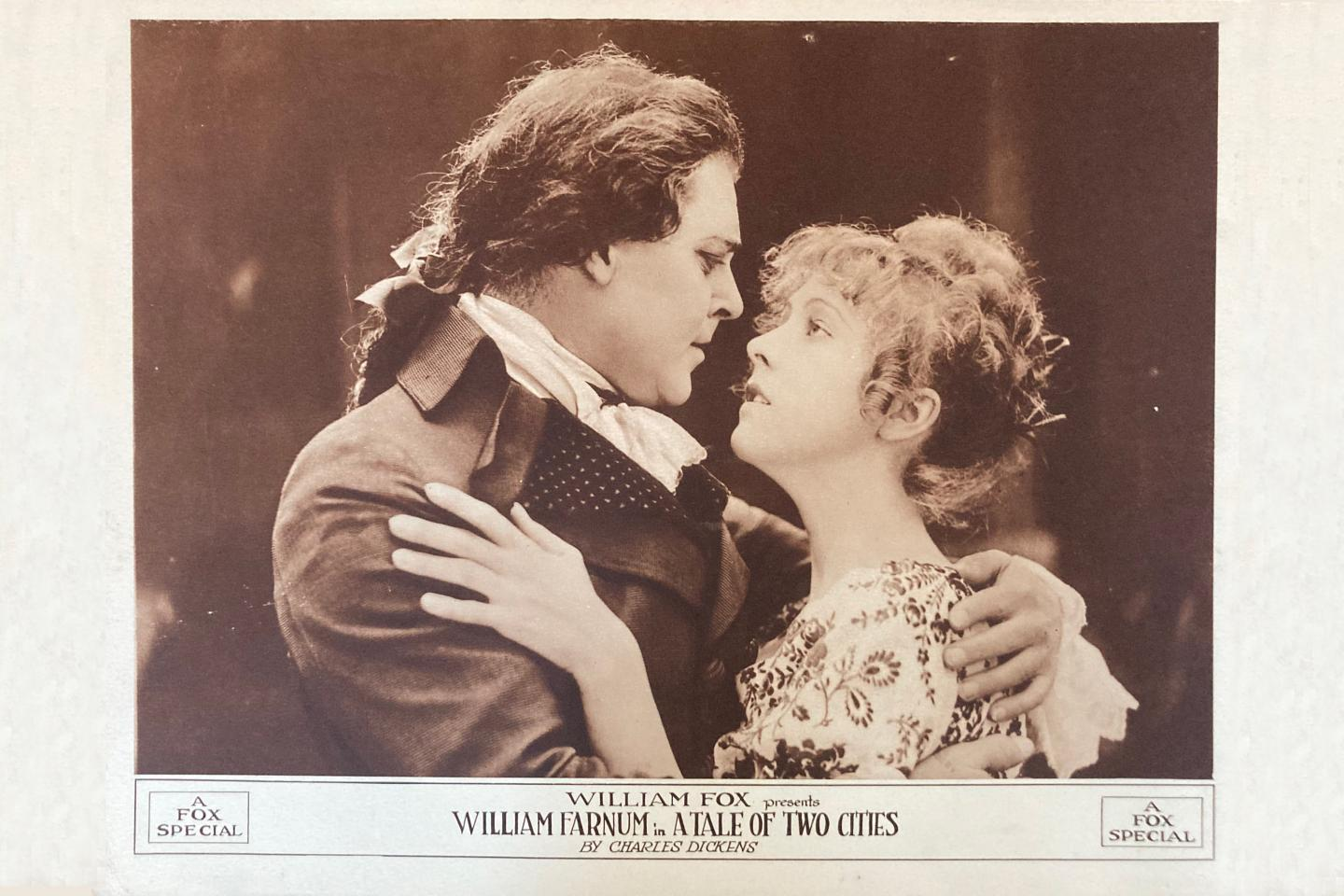
- Directed by: Frank Lloyd
- Written by: Frank Lloyd
- Based on: A Tale of Two Cities; 1859 novel by Charles Dickens
- Starring: William Farnum; Jewel Carmen; Charles Clary; Herschel Mayall
- Cinematography: William C. Foster; George Schneiderman
- Production company: Fox Film Corporation
- Distributed by: Fox Film Corporation
- Release date: March 11, 1917
- Running time: 80 minutes
- Country: United States
- Language: Silent (English intertitles)

A Tale of Two Cities

A Tale of Two Cities is a 1917 American silent historical drama film directed by Frank Lloyd and starring William Farnum, Jewel Carmen, and Charles Clary. The film is based on Charles Dickens' 1859 novel of the same name, which has been filmed a number of times. A complete print of this film survives.

== Premise ==
During the French Revolution a British lawyer courageously takes the place of a French aristocrat sentenced to be guillotined.

== Cast ==
- William Farnum as Charles Darnay / Sydney Carton
- Jewel Carmen as Lucie Manette
- Charles Clary as Marquis St. Evenmonde
- Herschel Mayall as Jacques Defarge
- Rosita Marstini as Madame Therese Defarge
- Josef Swickard as Dr. Alexandre Manette
- Ralph Lewis as Roger Cly
- William Clifford as Gabelle
- Marc Robbins as Jarvis Lorry
- Olive White as Miss Pross
- Willard Louis as Mr. CJ Stryver
- Harry De Vere as Gaspard
- Florence Vidor as Mimi

== Bibliography ==
- Goble, Alan. The Complete Index to Literary Sources in Film. Walter de Gruyter, 1999.
