= Marc Robbins =

American actor

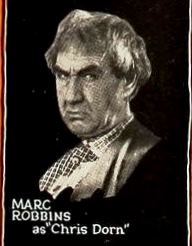
- Robbins in Riders of the Dawn, 1920
- Born: January 3, 1868
- Died: April 5, 1931 (aged 63); Los Angeles, California, US
- Years active: 1914–1923

Marc Robbins (January 3, 1868 – April 5, 1931) was an American actor of the silent era. He appeared in 78 films between 1914 and 1923. He died in Los Angeles, California.

Morey was from Topeka, Kansas, and he acted with the Morey Stock Company there. After his father's death, he and his mother moved to California, and he began working in films.

== Selected filmography ==
- The Master Key (1914)
- Judge Not; or The Woman of Mona Diggings (1915)
- The Star of the Sea (1915)
- An International Marriage (1916)
- Secret Love (1916)
- A Tale of Two Cities (1917)
- When a Man Sees Red (1917)
- The Heart of a Lion (1917)
- Riders of the Purple Sage (1918)
- Alias Jimmy Valentine (1920)
- Li Ting Lang (1920)
- The Girl Who Ran Wild (1922)
