= List of lost silent films (1915–1919) =

This is a list of lost silent films that were released from 1915 to 1919.

Year	Film	Director	Cast	Notes	Ref
1915	Anna Karenina	J. Gordon Edwards	Betty Nansen, Edward José	The first American adaptation of the novel	
1915	Bella Donna	Edwin S. Porter, Hugh Ford	Pauline Frederick		
1915	The Black Box	Otis Turner	Herbert Rawlinson	A 15-chapter serial	
1915	By the Shortest of Heads	Bert Haldane	George Formby	Last known copy destroyed in 1940	
1915	Carmen	Raoul Walsh	Theda Bara, Einar Linden		
1915	The Clemenceau Case	Herbert Brenon	Theda Bara, William E. Shay		
1915	Destruction	Will S. Davis	Theda Bara		
1915	The Devil's Daughter	Frank Powell	Theda Bara	Filmed on location in St. Augustine, Florida, this production marked Bara's fourth screen portrayal as a "vamp".	
1915	The Diamond from the Sky	Jacques Jaccard, William Desmond Taylor	Lottie Pickford, Irving Cummings, William Russell	A 30-chapter adventure serial	
1915	Esmeralda	James Kirkwood	Mary Pickford		
1915	The Eternal City	Edwin Stanton Porter, Hugh Ford	Pauline Frederick	One of the first American productions filmed in Rome	
1915	The Galley Slave	J. Gordon Edwards	Theda Bara, Stuart Holmes		
1915	A Girl of Yesterday	Allan Dwan	Mary Pickford, Frances Marion, Glenn L. Martin		
1915	The Goose Girl	Frederick A. Thomson	Marguerite Clark		
1915	Graft	George Lessey, Richard Stanton	Harry Carey	A serial of 20 chapters	
1915	His Lordship's Dilemma		W. C. Fields	Possibly found in a Belgian film archive	
1915	Inspiration	George Foster Platt	Audrey Munson, Thomas A. Curran		
1915	Jim the Penman	Edwin S. Porter	John B. Mason, Harold Lockwood		
1915	The Kreutzer Sonata	Herbert Brenon	Nance O'Neil, Theda Bara, William E. Shay		
1915	Lady Audley's Secret	Marshall Farnum	Theda Bara, Riley Hatch, Clifford Bruce		
1915	The Last Night of the Barbary Coast	Hal Mohr, Sol Lesser		Early example of an exploitation film, purportedly showing the last night of the Barbary Coast red-light district of San Francisco	
1915	Life Without Soul	Joseph W. Smiley	Percy Standing	The second film based upon the novel Frankenstein	
1915	Neal of the Navy	William Bertram, W. M. Harvey	William Courtleigh, Jr. Lillian Lorraine	A 14-chapter serial	
1915	The New Exploits of Elaine	Louis J. Gasnier, Leopold Wharton, Theodore Wharton	Pearl White, Creighton Hale	A 10-chapter serial	
1915	The Nigger	Edgar Lewis	William Farnum		
1915	The Pine's Revenge	Joe De Grasse	Lon Chaney; Cleo Madison		
1915	The Pretty Sister of Jose	Allan Dwan	Marguerite Clark, Jack Pickford, Rupert Julian	Clark's second film directed by Allan Dwan	
1915	Quits	Joseph De Grasse	Arthur Shirley, Lon Chaney	A one-reel short	
1915	The Romance of Elaine	George B. Seitz	Pearl White	A 12-chapter serial	
1915	Rupert of Hentzau	George Loane Tucker	Henry Ainley, Jane Gail, Gerald Ames		
1915	Sin	Herbert Brenon	Theda Bara, William E. Shay		
1915	Sold	Edwin S. Porter, Hugh Ford	Pauline Frederick		
1915	The Soul of Broadway	Herbert Brenon	Valeska Suratt	The debut film for Suratt, who played vamp roles in the vein of Theda Bara. All 11 of Suratt's films were destroyed in the 1937 Fox storage fire.	
1915	The Star of the Sea	Joe De Grasse	Lon Chaney, Pauline Bush		
1915	Steady Company	Joe De Grasse	Lon Chaney, Pauline Bush	A one-reel short	
1915	Temptation	Cecil B. DeMille	Geraldine Farrar, Theodore Roberts, Pedro de Cordoba		
1915	The Threads of Fate	Joe De Grasse	Pauline Bush, William C. Dowlan, Lon Chaney		
1915	The Two Orphans	Herbert Brenon	Theda Bara	Later remade by D. W. Griffith as Orphans of the Storm, starring Dorothy Gish and Lillian Gish	
1915	Under the Crescent	Burton L. King	Ola Humphrey	A six-chapter serial	
1915	The Valley of Lost Hope	Romaine Fielding	Romaine Fielding, Mildred Gregory, Peter Lang	Western involving a crashing locomotive	
1915	The Wild Goose Chase	Cecil B. DeMille	Ina Claire		
1915	Zaza	Edwin S. Porter, Hugh Ford	Pauline Frederick		
1916	Acquitted	Paul Powell	Wilfred Lucas, Mary Alden, Bessie Love		
1916	The Adventures of Peg o' the Ring	Francis Ford, Jacques Jaccard	Grace Cunard, Francis Ford	A 15-chapter serial	
1916	The Apostle of Vengeance	William S. Hart	William S. Hart	An early Western.	
1916	Audrey	Robert G. Vignola	Pauline Frederick		
1916	The Black Butterfly	Burton L. King	Olga Petrova, Mahlon Hamilton, Morgan Jones	Destroyed in the 1965 MGM vault fire	
1916	Casey of the Coast Guard	William Nigh	George O'Hara, Helen Ferguson	A ten-part serial	
1916	A Daughter of the Gods	Herbert Brenon	Annette Kellerman	A few feet were held in the Cinema Museum of London, but are now lost. A still survives of Kellerman's nude scene, the first by a major actress.	
1916	The Dream Girl	Cecil B. DeMille	Mae Murray, Theodore Roberts	One of the top-grossing films of 1916	
1916	The Eternal Sapho	Bertram Bracken	Theda Bara		
1916	The Fall of a Nation	Thomas Dixon, Jr.	Lorraine Huling, Percy Standing	The first sequel (of The Birth of a Nation)	
1916	The Flying Torpedo	John B. O'Brien, Christy Cabanne	John Emerson, Bessie Love		
1916	Gloria's Romance	Walter Edwin, Colin Campbell	Billie Burke, Henry Kolker, David Powell		
1916	Gold and the Woman	James Vincent	Theda Bara, Alma Hanlon		
1916	The Great Problem	Rex Ingram	Violet Mersereau, Dan Hanlon, Lionel Adams		
1916	He Got His Uncle's Goat	American Bioscope Company	Robert Bolder, Paula Reinbold	This was part of a series of comedy short-films based on the comic series "The Outbursts of Everett True". This film was originally shown at two theaters in Kalamazoo, Michigan, Elite and Lyric. The last documented showing was at the Y.M.C.A in Allentown, Pennsylvania in 1928.	
1916	The Heiress at Coffee Dan's	Edward Dillon	Bessie Love		
1916	Hell-to-Pay Austin	Paul Powell	Wilfred Lucas, Bessie Love, Eugene Pallette, Mary Alden		
1916	Her Double Life	J. Gordon Edwards	Theda Bara, Franklyn Hanna		
1916	His Losing Game	American Bioscope Company	Robert Bolder, Paula Reinbold	This was a comedy short-film based on the comic series "The Outbursts of Everett True". This was possibly an alternate title for the extant film "Everett True Breaks into the Movies", as different papers referred to one title or the other as the character's debut. This film was originally shown at two theaters in Kalamazoo, Michigan, Elite and Lyric.	
1916	Keechaka Vadham	R. Nataraja Mudaliar	Jeevarathnam, R. Nataraja Mudaliar, Raja Mudaliar	First silent film produced in South India	
1916	Lass of the Lumberlands	Paul Hurst, J. P. McGowan	Helen Holmes, Leo D. Maloney, Thomas G. Lingham	A 15-part serial	
1916	Liberty	Jacques Jaccard, Henry MacRae	Marie Walcamp, Jack Holt	A 20-chapter Western serial	
1916	Life's Whirlpool	Barry O'Neal	Holbrook Blinn, Fania Marinoff		
1916	Milestones	Thomas Bentley	Isobel Elsom	On the BFI 75 Most Wanted list	
1916	Das Phantom der Oper	Ernst Matray	Nils Olaf Chrisander, Aud Egede-Nissen		
1916	The Pioneers	Franklyn Barrett	Winter Hall	An Australian production	
1916	The Real Thing at Last	L. C. MacBean, J. M. Barrie	Edmund Gwenn, Marie Lohr, Ernest Thesiger, Frederick Kerr, Pauline Chase	A parody of Macbeth, written by Peter Pan playwright J. M. Barrie	
1916	The Realization of a Negro's Ambition	Harry A. Gant	Bessie Baker, Lottie Boles, Clarence Brooks	This two-reel short was Lincoln Motion Picture Company's first production.	
1916	Romeo and Juliet	J. Gordon Edwards	Theda Bara, Harry Hilliard		
1916	The Scarlet Runner	William P. S. Earle, Wally Van	Earle Williams, Marguerite Blake	A 12-chapter serial	
1916	Sequel to the Diamond from the Sky	Edward Sloman	William Russell, Rhea Mitchell	A four-chapter serial; the sequel to the 30-chapter serial The Diamond from the Sky	
1916	The Serpent	Raoul Walsh	Theda Bara	One of Theda Bara's many lost films	
1916	She	Will Barker, Horace Lisle Lucoque	Alice Delysia, Henry Victor, Sydney Bland		
1916	A Sister of Six	Chester M. Franklin, Sidney Franklin	Bessie Love		
1916	Stranded	Lloyd Ingraham	DeWolf Hopper		
1916	Their First Offense	American Bioscope Company	Robert Bolder, Paula Reinbold	This was the second in a series of comedy short-films based on the comic series "The Outbursts of Everett True". This film was originally shown at two theaters in Kalamazoo, Michigan, Elite and Lyric.	
1916	Under Two Flags	J. Gordon Edwards	Theda Bara, Herbert Heyes		
1916	The Valley of Fear	Alexander Butler	Harry Arthur Saintsbury, Daisy Burrell, Booth Conway		
1916	The Vixen	J. Gordon Edwards	Theda Bara, Herbert Heyes		
1916	The Witch	Frank Powell	Nance O'Neil, Alfred Hickman	Adaptation of the 1903 play La Sorcière (The Sorceress) by French dramatist Victorien Sardou	
1916	The World's Great Snare	Joseph Kaufman	Pauline Frederick, Irving Cummings		
1917	Alimony	Emmett J. Flynn	Lois Wilson, George Fisher	Screen debut (uncredited) of Rudolph Valentino	
1917	El Apóstol	Quirino Cristiani		Argentine production believed to be the world's first animated feature film	
1917	Australia's Peril	Franklyn Barrett	Roland Conway, Maie Baird		
1917	Birth Control	Margaret Sanger	Margaret Sanger	Documentary film produced by and starring the birth control activist Margaret Sanger was banned.	
1917	Brcko in Zagreb (Brcko u Zagrebu)	Arsen Maas	Arnošt Grund, Stjepan Bojničić	First Croatian feature film Only some images remain.	
1917	Camille	J. Gordon Edwards	Theda Bara	A reel was rumored to be found in a Russian archive, but was actually mislabeled. The film remains lost.	
1917	Cheerful Givers	Paul Powell	Bessie Love, Kenneth Harlan		
1917	Cheyenne's Pal	John Ford	Harry Carey		
1917	A Country Hero	Roscoe Arbuckle	Roscoe Arbuckle, Buster Keaton		
1917	The Darling of Paris	J. Gordon Edwards	Theda Bara; Glen White		
1917	The Deemster	Howell Hansel	Derwent Hall Caine, Marian Swayne		
1917	Double Crossed	Robert G. Vignola	Pauline Frederick		
1917	Der Golem und die Tänzerin	Paul Wegener		First sequel to a horror film	
1917	The Gray Ghost	Stuart Paton	Harry Carter, Priscilla Dean	A 16-part serial	
1917	Great Expectations	Robert G. Vignola	Louise Huff	The first film adaptation of the 1861 novel	
1917	Heart and Soul	J. Gordon Edwards	Theda Bara		
1917	Her Better Self	Robert G. Vignola	Pauline Frederick		
1917	Her Greatest Love	J. Gordon Edwards	Theda Bara, Walter Law		
1917	The Hidden Hand	James Vincent	Doris Kenyon, Sheldon Lewis	A 15-chapter serial	
1917	Imokawa Mukuzo Genkanban no Maki	Ōten Shimokawa		First anime produced and released in Japan	
1917	Jim Bludso	Tod Browning, Wilfred Lucas	Wilfred Lucas, Olga Grey	Browning's directorial debut	
1917	Life's Whirlpool	Lionel Barrymore	Ethel Barrymore	Lionel Barrymore's last directed silent film until talkies in 1929 and the only time he directed his sister in a film	
1917	Madame Du Barry	J. Gordon Edwards	Theda Bara		
1917	Magda	Emile Chautard	Clara Kimball Young, Valda Valkyrien		
1917	A Marked Man	John Ford	Harry Carey		
1917	The Monk and the Woman	Franklyn Barrett	Maud Fane, Percy Marmont, Harry Plimmer	An Australian production	
1917	The Mystery Ship	Harry Harvey, Henry MacRae, Francis Ford	Ben F. Wilson, Neva Gerber	An 18-chapter serial	
1917	National Red Cross Pageant	Christy Cabanne	An all-star cast, including Ethel Barrymore, Lionel and John Barrymore		
1917	Nina, the Flower Girl	Lloyd Ingraham	Bessie Love		
1917	A Night in New Arabia	Thomas R. Mills	Frank Glendon		
1917	Polly Ann	Charles Miller	Bessie Love		
1917	Red Saunders Plays Cupid	John Ford	Harry Carey, Claire Du Brey	A short	
1917	The Rose of Blood	J. Gordon Edwards	Theda Bara, Genevieve Blinn, Charles Clary		
1917	The Scrapper	John Ford	John Ford	A Western short	
1917	The Silent Lie	Raoul Walsh	Miriam Cooper, Ralph Lewis, Charles Clary		
1917	The Siren	Roland West	Valeska Suratt, Isabel Rea, Cesare Gravina, Armand Kalisz	A Western	
1917	Sleeping Fires	Hugh Ford	Pauline Frederick		
1917	Somewhere in Georgia	George Ridgwel	Ty Cobb, Elsie MacLeod	A movie featuring baseball legend Ty Cobb playing a fictionalized version of himself	
1917	The Soul Herder	John Ford	Harry Carey, Claire Du Brey		
1917	Sowers and Reapers	George D. Baker	Emmy Wehlen, Frank Currier, Harry Davenport		
1917	The Tiger Woman	J. Gordon Edwards	Theda Bara		
1917	The Voice on the Wire	Stuart Paton	Ben F. Wilson, Neva Gerber	A 15-chapter serial	
1917	Wee Lady Betty	Charles Miller	Bessie Love, Frank Borzage, Charles K. French		
1918	Alraune	Michael Curtiz, Edmund Fritz	Géza Erdélyi, Gyula Gál	A Hungarian science-fiction horror film	
1918	Arizona	Albert Parker	Douglas Fairbanks		
1918	Bees in His Bonnet	Gilbert Pratt	Harold Lloyd	A comedy short	
1918	Bound in Morocco	Allan Dwan	Douglas Fairbanks		
1918	The Dawn of Understanding	David Smith	Bessie Love		
1918	Five Thousand an Hour	Ralph Ince	Hale Hamilton, Lucille Lee Stewart, Douglas Gilbert		
1918	The Forbidden Path	J. Gordon Edwards	Theda Bara, Hugh Thompson		
1918	A Gentleman's Agreement	David Smith	Gayne Whitman, Nell Shipman		
1918	The Glorious Adventure	Hobart Henley	Mae Marsh, Wyndham Standing, Alec B. Francis, Mammy Lou, Mabel Ballin	Destroyed in the 1965 MGM vault fire	
1918	The Great Love	D. W. Griffith	Lillian Gish	This melodrama incorporated actual footage of England and France under World War I conditions, including an air raid and a battle.	
1918	The Greatest Thing in Life	D. W. Griffith	Lillian Gish		
1918	Headin' South	Allan Dwan	Douglas Fairbanks		
1918	The Hiding of Black Bill	David Smith	Walter Rogers, Chet Ryan		
1918	How Could You, Caroline?	Frederick A. Thomson	Bessie Love, James W. Morrison, Dudley Hawley		
1918	Hit Him Again	Gilbert Pratt	Harold Lloyd	A one-reel short	
1918	How Could You, Jean?	William Desmond Taylor	Mary Pickford		
1918	Huns Within Our Gates		Derwent Hall Caine	Early World War I propaganda film. Also known as The Commercial Pirates and The Hearts of Men	
1918	The Kaiser, the Beast of Berlin	Rupert Julian	Rupert Julian	Early World War I propaganda film	
1918	The Lamb	Harold Lloyd, Gilbert Pratt	Harold Lloyd	A short, one-reel comedy	
1918	The Lion's Claws	Harry Harvey, Jacques Jaccard	Marie Walcamp, Ray Hanford	An 18-episode serial	
1918	A Little Sister of Everybody	Robert Thornby	Bessie Love, George Fisher		
1918	On the Quiet	Chester Withey	John Barrymore		
1918	Our Mrs. McChesney	Ralph Ince	Ethel Barrymore		
1918	The Phantom Riders	John Ford	Harry Carey		
1918	The Purple Dress	Martin Justice	Agnes Ayres, Adele DeGarde		
1918	The Romance of Tarzan	Scott Sidney	Elmo Lincoln	The second Tarzan film produced	
1918	The Savage Woman	Edmund Mortimer	Clara Kimball Young, Milton Sills		
1918	Say! Young Fellow	Joseph Henabery	Douglas Fairbanks		
1918	The She-Devil	J. Gordon Edwards	Theda Bara		
1918	Sic 'Em, Towser		Harold Lloyd		
1918	The Song of the Soul	Tom Terriss	Alice Joyce		
1918	A Successful Adventure	Harry L. Franklin	May Allison, Harry Hilliard		
1918	That Devil, Bateese	William Wolbert	Lon Chaney	Chaney's final film in his first stint at Universal	
1918	Thieves' Gold	John Ford	Harry Carey		
1918	Three Mounted Men	John Ford	Harry Carey		
1918	Under the Yoke	J. Gordon Edwards	Theda Bara, G. Raymond Nye		
1918	We Can't Have Everything	Cecil B. DeMille	Kathlyn Williams, Elliott Dexter		
1918	What Happened to Jean	Herbert Walsh	Edith Crowe	Made to raise money for charity. Most of the cast and crew were amateurs.	
1918	Wild Women	John Ford	Harry Carey		
1918	The Woman in the Web	Paul Hurst, David Smith	Hedda Nova	A 15-chapter serial	
1918	A Woman's Fool	John Ford	Harry Carey		
1919	Ace of the Saddle	John Ford	Harry Carey		
1919	The Adventures of Ruth	George Marshall	Ruth Roland, Herbert Heyes	A 15-chapter serial	
1919	Anne of Green Gables	William Desmond Taylor	Mary Miles Minter		
1919	The Avalanche	George Fitzmaurice	Elsie Ferguson		
1919	Bare Fists	John Ford	Harry Carey		
1919	The Beetle	Alexander Butler	Fred Morgan, Maudie Dunham		
1919	The Big Little Person	Robert Z. Leonard	Mae Murray, Rudolph Valentino		
1919	The Black Secret	George B. Seitz	Pearl White, Walter McGrail	A 15-chapter serial	
1919	Bonds of Love	Reginald Barker	Pauline Frederick		
1919	The Cambric Mask	Tom Terriss	Maurice Costello, Alice Joyce		
1919	Carolyn of the Corners	Robert Thornby	Bessie Love, Charles Edler, Charlotte Mineau		
1919	Count the Votes	Hal Roach	Harold Lloyd		
1919	Dalagang Bukid	José Nepomuceno	Atang Dela Rama, Marceliano Ilagan	It is the first Filipino feature film to be locally produced in the Philippines. Nearly all of Nepomuceno's works are lost.	
1919	A Daughter of Eve	Walter West	Violet Hopson, Stewart Rome, Cameron Carr		
1919	The Divorcee	Herbert Blaché	Ethel Barrymore, E. J. Ratcliffe, Holmes Herbert	Barrymore's last silent film	
1919	Elmo the Mighty	Henry MacRae	Elmo Lincoln, Grace Cunard	An 18-chapter serial	
1919	The Enchanted Barn	David Smith	Bessie Love, J. Frank Glendon		
1919	A Fight for Love	John Ford	Harry Carey, John Big Tree		
1919	The Fighting Brothers	John Ford	Pete Morrison	A short Western	
1919	A Fighting Colleen	David Smith	Bessie Love, Charles Spere		
1919	The First Men in the Moon	Bruce Gordon, J. L. V. Leigh	Hector Abbas, Lionel D'Aragon	First film adapted directly from a work by H. G. Wells. Has been partially recreated as a series of still pictures.	
1919	The Great Radium Mystery	Robert Broadwell, Robert F. Hill	Cleo Madison, Bob Reeves	An 18-chapter serial	
1919	Halbblut	Fritz Lang	Carl de Vogt, Ressel Orla, Carl Gerard Schröder	Lang's directorial debut	
1919	The Hawk's Trail	W. S. Van Dyke	King Baggot, Grace Darmond	A 15-chapter serial	
1919	He Leads, Others Follow	Vincent P. Bryan, Hal Roach	Harold Lloyd	A one-reel comedy short	
1919	Here Comes the Bride	John S. Robertson	John Barrymore, Faire Binney		
1919	Der Herr der Liebe	Fritz Lang	Carl de Vogt	This is the only film in which director Fritz Lang had an acting role.	
1919	His Only Father	Hal Roach, Frank Terry	Harold Lloyd	A one-reel short	
1919	The Homesteader	Oscar Micheaux, Jerry Mills	Charles D. Lucas	First feature length film directed by a Black filmmaker	
1919	The Isle of Conquest	Edward Jose	Norma Talmadge		
1919	Kathleen Mavourneen	Charles Brabin	Theda Bara		
1919	The Knickerbocker Buckaroo	Albert Parker	Douglas Fairbanks, William A. Wellman		
1919	La Belle Russe	Charles Brabin	Theda Bara, Warburton Gamble		
1919	The Light	J. Gordon Edwards	Theda Bara, Eugene Ormond, Robert Walker		
1919	The Lion Man	Albert Russell, Jack Wells	Kathleen O'Connor, Jack Perrin	An 18-chapter serial	
1919	The Little Boss	David Smith	Bessie Love, Wallace MacDonald		
1919	Lure of Ambition	Edmund Lawrence	Theda Bara		
1919	Marked Men	John Ford	Harry Carey		
1919	The Midnight Man	James W. Horne	James J. Corbett, Kathleen O'Connor	An 18-chapter serial	
1919	Nobody Home	Elmer Clifton	Dorothy Gish, Ralph Graves, George Fawcett, Rudolph Valentino		
1919	One Week of Life	Hobart Henley	Pauline Frederick		
1919	The Outcasts of Poker Flat	John Ford	Harry Carey		
1919	Over the Garden Wall	David Smith	Bessie Love		
1919	The Rajah	Hal Roach	Harold Lloyd	A short	
1919	The Red Glove	J. P. McGowan	Marie Walcamp, Pat O'Malley	An 18-chapter serial	
1919	Rider of the Law	John Ford	Harry Carey		
1919	Riders of Vengeance	John Ford	Harry Carey		
1919	Roped	John Ford	Harry Carey		
1919	The Shepherd of the Hills	Louis F. Gottschalk, Harold Bell Wright	Harry Lonsdale, Cathrine Curtis, George A. McDaniel		
1919	Si, Senor	Alfred J. Goulding	Harold Lloyd	A one-reel short	
1919	The Siren's Song	J. Gordon Edwards	Theda Bara		
1919	Soft Money	Vincent P. Bryan, Hal Roach	Harold Lloyd		
1919	The Splendid Romance	Edward José	Enrico Caruso, Ormi Hawley, Crauford Kent	A print may be held by a private collector.	
1919	Terror of the Range	Stuart Paton	George Larkin, Betty Compson	A seven-episode serial	
1919	The Test of Honor	John S. Robertson	John Barrymore, Constance Binney	Barrymore's first dramatic role in a feature film	
1919	The Undercurrent	Wilfrid North	Arthur Guy Empey		
1919	The Unknown Quantity	Thomas R. Mills	Corinne Griffith		
1919	When Men Desire	J. Gordon Edwards	Theda Bara		
1919	The Wishing Ring Man	David Smith	Bessie Love, J. Frank Glendon		
1919	A Woman There Was	J. Gordon Edwards	Theda Bara, Alan Roscoe		
1919	A Yankee Princess	David Smith	Bessie Love		
