= John Ford filmography =

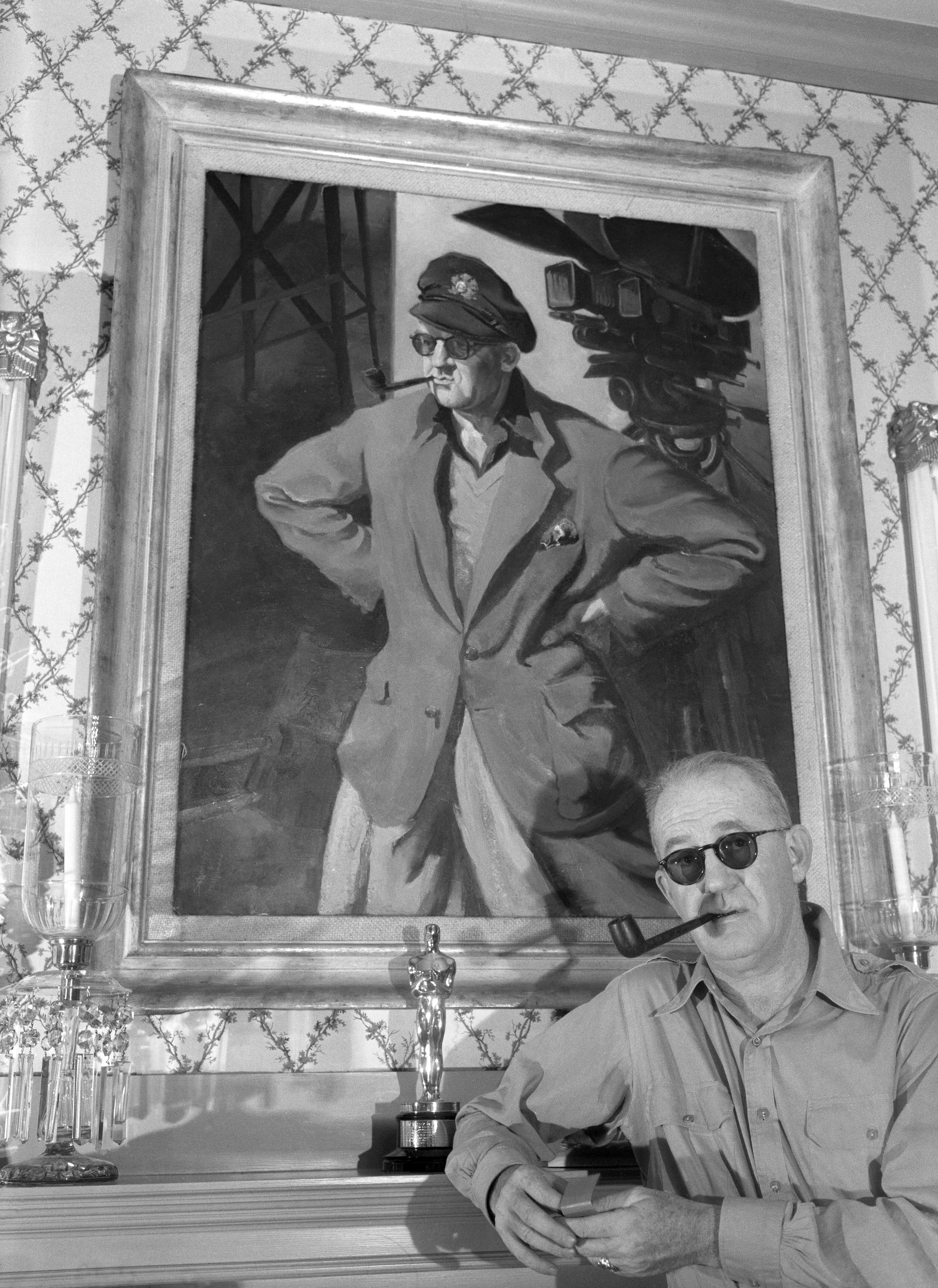
John Ford with portrait and Academy Award, circa 1946

John Ford (1894–1973) was an American film director whose career spanned from 1913 to 1971. During this time, he directed more than 130 films; however, nearly all of his silent films are lost. Born in Maine, Ford entered the filmmaking industry shortly after graduating from high school with the help of his older brother, Francis Ford, who had established himself as a leading man and director for Universal Studios. After working as an actor, assistant director, stuntman, and prop man – often for his brother – Universal gave Ford the opportunity to direct in 1917. Initially working in short films, he quickly moved into features, largely with Harry Carey as his star.

In 1920, Ford left Universal and began working for the Fox Film Corporation. During the next ten years he directed more than 30 films, including the westerns The Iron Horse (1924) and 3 Bad Men (1926), both starring George O'Brien, the war drama Four Sons and the Irish romantic drama Hangman's House (both 1928 and both starring Victor McLaglen). In the same year as these last two films, Ford directed his first all-talking film, the short Napoleon's Barber. The following year, he directed his first all-talking feature, The Black Watch.

In 1931, Ford began working for other studios, starting with Arrowsmith for Samuel Goldwyn. In 1934, he began a lengthy association with producer Merian C. Cooper at RKO Radio Pictures. The following year he directed The Informer, which brought him his first Academy Award for Best Director and the Best Actor Award for its star, Victor McLaglen. In 1939, Ford directed Stagecoach, which made John Wayne a major star and brought an Academy Award for Best Supporting Actor to Thomas Mitchell. It was also the first time Ford filmed in Monument Valley. That same year Ford made Young Mr. Lincoln and Drums Along the Mohawk, both with Henry Fonda. The latter was Ford's first film shot in Technicolor.

In 1940, Ford made The Grapes of Wrath with Fonda and The Long Voyage Home with Wayne and Mitchell. For the former film Ford received his second Academy Award for Best Director and the Best Supporting Actress for Jane Darwell. He followed these films in 1941 with How Green Was My Valley, which won the Academy Award for Best Picture, brought Ford his third Academy Award for Best Director and the Best Supporting Actor Award to Donald Crisp.

With the coming of World War II, Ford was appointed to the Office of Strategic Services as a field photographer in the United States Navy. During the war he made several documentaries. Two of these, The Battle of Midway and December 7th, won Academy Awards for, respectively, Best Documentary and Documentary Short Subject. After being released from active duty he returned to Hollywood to make They Were Expendable (1945) a war drama of PT boats in the South Pacific. He followed this with My Darling Clementine (1946), starring Henry Fonda as Wyatt Earp.

In 1949, Ford also made his only foray into live theatre by directing a charity production of What Price Glory? Ford freelanced for the remainder of his career, directing occasionally for television and making several films including The Man Who Shot Liberty Valance and the Civil War sequence of the Cinerama epic How the West Was Won (both 1962). Ford's final film as a director was Chesty (1970), a documentary short about Marine Corps lieutenant general Lewis "Chesty" Puller.

Ford is widely regarded as one of the most important and influential film-makers in history. Ingmar Bergman called him the greatest movie director of all time and Orson Welles regarded him highly. With four Academy Awards, he is the most honored director in film history. On February 8, 1960, Ford was awarded a star on the Hollywood Walk of Fame. On March 31, 1973, Ford was honored with the Medal of Freedom Award and became the first person honored with the AFI Life Achievement Award. As of 2026, eleven films directed or co-directed by Ford have been added to the National Film Registry, tying with Howard Hawks for the most. In 2012, The Searchers was ranked at number seven in Sight & Sound's listing of the 50 greatest films of all time.

== Films ==
This list of films is derived from the filmographies in Print the Legend: The Life and Times of John Ford by Scott Eyman and John Ford by Peter Bogdanovich.

From 1917 to 1923, Ford was credited as "Jack Ford". Beginning with Cameo Kirby (1923) he was credited as "John Ford". (Note: Ford's real name was John Martin Feeney. He was commonly known as Jack. His older brother, Francis Feeney, took the professional name of "Francis Ford" when he became an actor as it sounded more professional and less ethnic. When Jack entered films, he took on the last name of Ford as well. With Cameo Kirby he altered his name to "John Ford" as it sounded more dignified.) Unless otherwise noted, all films released up until 1922 were Universal Productions. Films released from 1922 to 1930 were Fox Productions. After 1930, each film's production company is individually noted.

All films are feature length unless identified as a serial or short film. (Note: According to the rules of the Academy of Motion Picture Arts and Sciences, a feature-length motion picture has a running time of more than 40 minutes.) The silent shorts are identified as one, two, or three reels in length.

Year	Title	Director	Producer	Actor	Writer	Notes	Ref
1917	The Tornado	Yes		Yes	Yes	With Jean Hathaway; two reels. Ford's directorial debut film; lost.	
1917	The Trail of Hate	Yes		Yes		Two reels; lost.	
1917	The Scrapper	Yes		Yes	Yes	Two reels; lost.	
1917	The Soul Herder	Yes				With Harry Carey, Molly Malone, Hoot Gibson; three reels; lost; Ford's first film with Carey and Gibson.	
1917	Straight Shooting	Yes				With Harry Carey; Ford's debut feature film.	
1917	The Secret Man	Yes				With Harry Carey; two of the five reels survive.	
1917	A Marked Man	Yes				With Harry Carey, Molly Malone; lost.	
1917	Cheyenne's Pal	Yes			Yes	With Harry Carey, Gertrude Astor, Hoot Gibson; two reels; lost.	
1917	Bucking Broadway	Yes			Yes	With Harry Carey, Molly Malone; released as a bonus on the Criterion blu-ray of Stagecoach.	
1918	The Phantom Riders	Yes				With Harry Carey, Molly Malone; lost.	
1918	Wild Women	Yes			Yes	With Harry Carey, Molly Malone; story by Ford and Carey; lost.	
1918	Thieves' Gold	Yes				With Harry Carey, Molly Malone; lost.	
1918	The Scarlet Drop	Yes			Yes	With Harry Carey, Molly Malone; only 30 minutes of footage were thought to have survived until a complete film cut was discovered in Santiago, Chile.	
1918	Hell Bent	Yes			Yes	With Harry Carey, Duke R. Lee; print survives in the George Eastman Museum.	
1918	A Woman's Fool	Yes				With Harry Carey, Betty Schade; lost.	
1918	Three Mounted Men	Yes				With Harry Carey; lost.	
1919	Roped	Yes				With Harry Carey, Neva Gerber; lost.	
1919	The Fighting Brothers	Yes				With Pete Morrison, Hoot Gibson; two reels; lost.	
1919	A Fight for Love	Yes				With Harry Carey; lost.	
1919	Rustlers	Yes				With Pete Morrison, Hoot Gibson; two reels; possibly directed by Reginald Barker; survival status unknown.	
1919	Bare Fists	Yes				With Harry Carey, Betty Schade; lost.	
1919	Gun Law	Yes				With Pete Morrison, Hoot Gibson; two reels; survival status unknown.	
1919	The Gun Packer	Yes			Yes	With Pete Morrison, Hoot Gibson; two reels; story by Ford and Harry Carey; survival status unknown.	
1919	By Indian Post	Yes				With Pete Morrison, Duke R. Lee; two reels; survives incomplete.	
1919	Riders of Vengeance	Yes			Yes	With Harry Carey, Seena Owen; lost.	
1919	The Last Outlaw	Yes				With Edgar Jones, Lucille Hutton; two reels; only the first reel survives.	
1919	The Outcasts of Poker Flat	Yes				With Harry Carey, Cullen Landis; based on the short story by Bret Harte; lost.	
1919	Ace of the Saddle	Yes				With Harry Carey, Duke R. Lee; lost.	
1919	Rider of the Law	Yes				With Harry Carey, Vester Pegg; lost.	
1919	A Gun Fightin' Gentleman	Yes			Yes	With Harry Carey, J. Barney Sherry; Partially lost – three reels survive.	
1919	Marked Men	Yes				With Harry Carey; remade by Ford as 3 Godfathers (1948) (Note: Other screen adaptations of Kyne's story include a 1916 Bluebird film directed by Edward LeSaint and starring Harry Carey, Hell's Heroes (1930), directed by William Wyler and starring Charles Bickford, Three Godfathers (1936) directed by Richard Boleslawski and starring Chester Morris, and a TV movie, The Godchild (1974), directed by John Badham and starring Jack Palance.); lost.	
1920	The Prince of Avenue A	Yes				With James J. Corbett, Richard Cummings; Ford's first non-western film; lost.	
1920	The Girl in Number 29	Yes				With Frank Mayo, Elinor Fair; lost.	
1920	Hitchin' Posts	Yes				With Frank Mayo; lost.	
1920	Just Pals	Yes				Fox films; with Buck Jones, Helen Ferguson; Ford's first film for Fox; prints survive.	
1921	The Big Punch	Yes				Fox films; with Buck Jones, Barbara Bedford; lost.	
1921	The Freeze-Out	Yes				With Harry Carey, Helen Ferguson; lost.	
1921	The Wallop	Yes				With Harry Carey, Mignonne Golden; lost.	
1921	Desperate Trails	Yes				With Harry Carey, Irene Rich; lost.	
1921	Action	Yes				With Hoot Gibson, Francis Ford; lost.	
1921	Sure Fire	Yes				With Hoot Gibson, Molly Malone; lost.	
1921	Jackie	Yes				Fox films; with Shirley Mason, William Scott; lost.	
1922	Little Miss Smiles	Yes				With Shirley Mason, Gaston Glass; lost.	
1922	Silver Wings	Yes				With Mary Carr, Lynn Hammond; Ford directed the prologue only, the remainder of the film was directed by Edwin Carewe; lost.	
1922	The Village Blacksmith	Yes				With Will Walling, Virginia True Boardman; only one reel survives.	
1923	The Face on the Bar-Room Floor	Yes				With Henry B. Walthall, Ruth Clifford; based on the poem by Hugh Antoine d'Arcy (Note: Charlie Chaplin made a one-reel version of this poem in 1914.); lost.	
1923	Three Jumps Ahead	Yes			Yes	With Tom Mix, Alma Bennett; lost.	
1923	Cameo Kirby	Yes				With John Gilbert, Gertrude Olmstead; Ford's first film credited as "John Ford".	
1923	North of Hudson Bay	Yes		Yes		With Tom Mix, Kathleen Key; Ford has a bit part in the film; 40 minutes of footage survive.	
1923	Hoodman Blind	Yes				With David Butler, Gladys Hulette; lost.	
1924	The Iron Horse	Yes	Yes			With George O'Brien, Madge Bellamy; added to the National Film Registry in 2011.	
1924	Hearts of Oak	Yes				With Hobart Bosworth, Pauline Starke; lost.	
1925	Lightnin'	Yes				With Jay Hunt, Madge Bellamy, Wallace MacDonald. (Note: Remade in 1930 with Will Rogers starring and David Butler directing.)	
1925	Kentucky Pride	Yes				With Henry B. Walthall, Gertrude Astor.	
1925	Thank You	Yes				With Alec B. Francis, Jacqueline Logan, George O'Brien; lost.	
1925	The Fighting Heart	Yes				With George O'Brien, Billie Dove; lost.	
1926	The Shamrock Handicap	Yes				With Janet Gaynor, Leslie Fenton, J. Farrell MacDonald; print survives at the Museum of Modern Art.	
1926	3 Bad Men	Yes			Yes	With George O'Brien, Olive Borden.	
1926	The Blue Eagle	Yes				With George O'Brien, Janet Gaynor; one reel missing.	
1927	Upstream	Yes				With Nancy Nash, Earle Foxe; Once lost, but rediscovered in New Zealand.	
1928	Mother Machree	Yes				With Belle Bennett, Neil Hamilton, Victor McLaglen; Movietone sound (music and sound effects only); John Wayne's first film with Ford, albeit in an uncredited minor role; Wayne was also a prop man in this film; three reels survive.	
1928	Four Sons	Yes				With Margaret Mann, James Hall; Movietone sound (music, limited dialogue, and sound effects only); John Wayne in uncredited minor role.	
1928	Hangman's House	Yes				With Victor McLaglen, June Collyer; silent film; John Wayne in uncredited minor role.	
1928	Napoleon's Barber	Yes				With Otto Matieson, Natalie Golitzen; Short film; Ford's first all-talkie film; lost.	
1928	Riley the Cop	Yes				With J. Farrell MacDonald, Louise Fazenda; Silent film with synchronized music track.	
1929	Strong Boy	Yes				With Victor McLaglen, Leatrice Joy; Silent film with synchronized music track; Believed lost although a print may exist in Australia.	
1929	The Black Watch	Yes				With Victor McLaglen, Myrna Loy; Ford's first all-talkie feature. (Note: Remade in 1954 as King of the Khyber Rifles, directed by Henry King and starring Tyrone Power.)	
1929	Salute	Yes				With George O'Brien, Helen Chandler; Ward Bond (in his film debut) and John Wayne have uncredited roles.	
1930	Men Without Women	Yes			Yes	With Kenneth MacKenna, Frank Albertson; John Wayne has an unbilled bit part; all-talkie film that "survives only in a bastardized version that replaces most of the dialogue with titles".	
1930	Born Reckless	Yes				With Edmund Lowe, Catherine Dale Owen.	
1930	Up the River	Yes			Yes	With Spencer Tracy, Humphrey Bogart (both in their film debuts). (Note: The TCM website states that Up the River was Humphrey Bogart's second film.)	
1930	Seas Beneath	Yes				With George O'Brien, Marion Lessing.	
1931	The Brat	Yes				Fox; with Sally O'Neil, Alan Dinehart. (Note: Previously filmed as The Brat (1919), directed by Herbert Blaché and starring Alla Nazimova, remade as Girl from Avenue A (1940).)	
1931	Arrowsmith	Yes				Goldwyn-United Artists; with Ronald Colman, Helen Hayes, Myrna Loy; United Artists; based on the novel by Sinclair Lewis; nominated – Academy Award for Best Picture.	
1932	Air Mail	Yes				Universal; with Ralph Bellamy, Gloria Stuart, Pat O'Brien.	
1932	Flesh	Yes				MGM; with Wallace Beery, Karen Morley, Ricardo Cortez.	
1933	Pilgrimage	Yes				Fox; with Henrietta Crosman, Heather Angel.	
1933	Doctor Bull	Yes				Fox; with Will Rogers, Marian Nixon.	
1934	The Lost Patrol	Yes				RKO Pictures; with Victor McLaglen, Boris Karloff. (Note: Previously filmed in 1929 with Cyril McLaglen in the role played by his brother, Victor McLaglen, in the Ford version.)	
1934	The World Moves On	Yes				Fox; with Madeleine Carroll, Franchot Tone.	
1934	Judge Priest	Yes				Fox; with Will Rogers, Tom Brown, Anita Louise, Henry B. Walthall.	
1935	The Whole Town's Talking	Yes				Columbia; with Edward G. Robinson, Jean Arthur.	
1935	The Informer	Yes				RKO Pictures; with Victor McLaglen, Heather Angel; based on the novel by Liam O'Flaherty, Academy Award for Best Director; Nominated – Best Picture. (Note: The Informer also won Academy Awards for Best Actor (Victor McLaglen), Best Screenplay (Dudley Nichols), and Best Music Score (Max Steiner). The Informer had been previously filmed in 1929, directed by Arthur Robison and starring Lars Hanson); added to the National Film Registry in 2018.	
1935	Steamboat Round the Bend	Yes				20th Century Fox; (Note: During production of Steamboat Round the Bend Fox Films merged with Darryl F. Zanuck's Twentieth Century Pictures to form 20th Century Fox.) with Will Rogers, Anne Shirley; Rogers' last film. (Note: Steamboat Round the Bend was released after Rogers' death in an airplane crash. Although it was the last film that Rogers made, a film he made prior to it, In Old Kentucky, was released later.)	
1936	The Prisoner of Shark Island	Yes				20th Century Fox; with Warner Baxter, Gloria Stuart.	
1936	Mary of Scotland	Yes				RKO Pictures; with Katharine Hepburn, Fredric March.	
1936	The Plough and the Stars	Yes				RKO Pictures; with Barbara Stanwyck, Preston Foster.	
1937	Wee Willie Winkie	Yes				20th Century Fox; with Shirley Temple, Victor McLaglen; originally release in sepiatone.	
1937	The Hurricane	Yes				Goldwyn-United Artists; with Dorothy Lamour, Jon Hall.	
1938	Four Men and a Prayer	Yes				20th Century Fox; with Loretta Young, Richard Greene, David Niven.	
1938	Submarine Patrol	Yes				20th Century Fox; with Richard Greene, Nancy Kelly.	
1939	Stagecoach	Yes	Yes			Wanger-United Artists; with Claire Trevor, John Wayne; Ford's first sound Western and his first film shot in Monument Valley; nominated – Best Picture; nominated – Academy Award for Best Director. (Note: Thomas Mitchell also received an Academy Award for Best Supporting Actor, and Richard Hageman, Franke Harling, John Leipold and Leo Shuken received an Academy Award for Best Original Score. Stagecoach was remade in 1966, directed by Gordon Douglas, and for TV in 1986, directed by Ted Post.); added to the National Film Registry in 1995.	
1939	Young Mr. Lincoln	Yes				20th Century Fox; with Henry Fonda; added to the National Film Registry in 2003.	
1939	Drums Along the Mohawk	Yes				20th Century Fox; with Claudette Colbert, Henry Fonda, Edna May Oliver; (Note: Edna May Oliver received an Academy Award nomination for Best Supporting Actress.) based on the novel by Walter D. Edmonds; Ford's first film in color (Technicolor).	
1940	The Grapes of Wrath	Yes				20th Century Fox; with Henry Fonda, Jane Darwell; based on the novel by John Steinbeck; Ford won an Academy Award for Best Director and Darwell won Best Supporting Actress; (Note: Also nominated for Academy Awards: Best Actor (Henry Fonda), Editing (Robert Simpson), Sound (E. H. Hansen), Writing (Nunnally Johnson, and Outstanding Production) added to the National Film Registry in 1989.	
1940	The Long Voyage Home	Yes	Yes			Argosy-United Artists; with John Wayne, Thomas Mitchell; based on four one-act plays by Eugene O'Neill; Ford's first production made by his company, Argosy Productions. (Note: The Long Voyage Home was nominated for the following Academy Awards: Black and White Cinematography (Gregg Toland), Film Editing (Sherman Todd), Original Score (Richard Hageman), Special Effects (R.T. Layton, R.O. Binger, Thomas T. Moulton), Best Screenplay (Dudley Nichols), and Outstanding Production.)	
1941	Tobacco Road	Yes				20th Century Fox; With Gene Tierney, Dana Andrews; based on the play by Jack Kirkland and the novel by Erskine Caldwell	
1941	How Green Was My Valley	Yes	Yes			20th Century Fox; with Walter Pidgeon, Maureen O'Hara, Donald Crisp, Roddy McDowall; based on the novel by Richard Llewellyn; Best Picture; Ford won an Academy Award for Best Director. (Note: How Green Was My Valley also won Academy Awards for Best Supporting Actor (Donald Crisp), Art Direction (black and white) (Richard Day, Nathan H. Juran, Thomas Little), and Best Cinematography (Arthur Miller)); added to the National Film Registry in 1990.	
1942	Sex Hygiene	Yes				U.S. Army Signal Corps; 30-minute training film.	
1942	The Battle of Midway	Yes				War Activities Committee; with Donald Crisp, Henry Fonda; filmed in color; won the Academy Award for Best Documentary Feature.	
1942	Torpedo Squadron	Yes				Documentary short for the United States Navy; filmed in color.	
1943	December 7th	Yes				Documentary short for the United States Navy; co-directed by Lt. Gregg Toland, USNR; won the Academy Award for Documentary Short Subject	
1943	We Sail at Midnight	Yes				Documentary short for the United States Navy.	
1943	How to Operate Behind Enemy Lines	Yes		Yes		Ford appears in this training film for the OSS.	
1945	They Were Expendable	Yes	Yes			MGM; with Robert Montgomery, John Wayne, Donna Reed; nominated for two Academy Awards – Best Visual Effects (A. Arnold Gillespie, Donald Jahraus, Robert A. MacDonald, Michael Steinoreand), Best Sound Recording (Douglas Shearer).	
1946	My Darling Clementine	Yes				20th Century Fox, with Henry Fonda, Linda Darnell, Victor Mature; filmed in Monument Valley; added to the National Film Registry in 1991.	
1947	The Fugitive	Yes	Yes			Argosy-RKO Pictures; with Henry Fonda, Dolores del Río.	
1948	Fort Apache	Yes	Yes			Argosy-RKO Pictures; with John Wayne, Henry Fonda, Shirley Temple, John Agar; suggested by the short story "Massacre" by James Warner Bellah; the first film in Ford's "Cavalry trilogy"; filmed in Monument Valley.	
1948	3 Godfathers	Yes	Yes			Argosy-MGM; With John Wayne, Pedro Armendariz, Harry Carey Jr.; filmed in Technicolor; based on the novel by Peter B. Kyne; filmed on location in Death Valley; a remake of Ford's Marked Men.	
1949	She Wore a Yellow Ribbon	Yes	Yes			Argosy-RKO Pictures; with John Wayne, Joanne Dru, John Agar; filmed in Technicolor; based on the short stories "The Big Hunt" and "War Party" by James Warner Bellah; film on location in Monument Valley; the second film in Ford's "Cavalry trilogy". (Note: Cinematographer Winton Hoch attempted to duplicate the style of Frederic Remington's western paintings in their screen images. Hoch won an Academy Award for Best Cinematography (Color).)	
1950	When Willie Comes Marching Home	Yes				20th Century Fox; with Dan Dailey, Corinne Calvet.	
1950	Wagon Master	Yes	Yes		Yes	Argosy-RKO Pictures; with Ben Johnson, Joanne Dru, Harry Carey Jr.; filmed on location in Moab, Utah.	
1950	Rio Grande	Yes	Yes			Argosy-Republic Pictures; with John Wayne, Maureen O'Hara, Claude Jarman, Jr.; based on the short story "Mission with No Record" by James Warner Bellah; filmed on location in Moab, Utah; the final film in Ford's "Cavalry trilogy".	
1951	This Is Korea!	Yes				U.S. Navy-Republic Pictures; filmed in color; documentary about the United States Navy and Marines during the Korean War.	
1952	The Quiet Man	Yes	Yes			Argosy-Republic Pictures; with John Wayne, Maureen O'Hara; filmed in Technicolor on location in Ireland; based on the short story by Maurice Walsh; Ford won an Academy Award for Best Director while Winton Hoch and Archie Stout won for Best Cinematography; added to the National Film Registry in 2013. (Note: The Quiet Man also received Academy Award nominations for Best Picture, Best Screenplay (Frank S. Nugent), Best Sound Recording (Daniel J. Bloomberg), Best Art Direction (Frank Hotaling; John McCarthy, Jr., Charles S. Thompson), and Best Supporting Actor (Victor McLaglen).)	
1952	What Price Glory	Yes				20th Century Fox; with James Cagney, Corinne Calvet, Dan Dailey; filmed in Technicolor; a remake of Raoul Walsh's 1926 film.	
1953	The Sun Shines Bright	Yes				Argosy-Republic Pictures; with Charles Winninger, Arleen Whelan.	
1953	Mogambo	Yes				MGM; with Clark Gable, Ava Gardner, Grace Kelly; filmed in Technicolor on location in Africa; based on the play Red Dust by Wilson Collison. (Note: Gable starred in Red Dust (1932), an earlier film version of Mogambo directed by Victor Fleming.)	
1955	The Long Gray Line	Yes				Columbia Pictures; with Tyrone Power, Maureen O'Hara; filmed in CinemaScope and Technicolor.	
1955	The Red, White, and Blue Line	Yes				A 10-minute film in CinemaScope and Technicolor promoting Americans to buy savings bonds. Filmed on the set of The Long Gray Line.	
1955	Mister Roberts	Yes				Warner Bros.; with Henry Fonda, James Cagney, Jack Lemmon, William Powell; based on the play by Thomas Heggen and Joshua Logan; filmed in CinemaScope and Warnercolor; Ford was replaced by Mervyn LeRoy during production; Lemmon won the Academy Award for Best Supporting Actor.	
1956	The Searchers	Yes	Yes			C. V. Whitney Pictures-Warner Bros.; with John Wayne, Jeffrey Hunter, Vera Miles; based on the novel by Alan Le May; filmed in VistaVision and Technicolor on location in Monument Valley; added to the National Film Registry in 1989; ranked at number seven in Sight & Sound's listing of the 50 greatest films of all time in 2012.	
1957	The Wings of Eagles	Yes				MGM; with John Wayne, Dan Dailey, Maureen O'Hara; filmed in Metrocolor.	
1957	The Growler Story	Yes				A short film in color for the U.S. Dept. of Defense about the USS Growler.	
1957	The Rising of the Moon	Yes				Warner Bros.; with Tyrone Power introducing three stories set in Ireland: "1921", "A Minute's Wait", and "The Majesty of the Law".	
1958	So Alone	Yes				Free Cinema-BFI; with John Qualen; 8-minute short film.	
1958	The Last Hurrah	Yes	Yes			Columbia Pictures; with Spencer Tracy, Jeffrey Hunter. (Note: Remade as a 1977 television film of the same name, starring Carroll O'Connor and directed by Vincent Sherman.)	
1958	Gideon's Day (US title: Gideon of Scotland Yard)	Yes				Columbia Pictures; with Jack Hawkins; made in England; filmed in Technicolor but originally released in the United States only in black and white.	
1959	Korea	Yes				A short film in color for the U.S. Dept. of Defense.	
1959	The Horse Soldiers	Yes				Mirisch-Batjac-United Artists; with John Wayne, William Holden, Constance Towers; filmed in Deluxe Color	
1960	Sergeant Rutledge	Yes				Warner Bros.; With Jeffrey Hunter, Constance Towers, Woody Strode; filmed in Technicolor on location in Monument Valley.	
1961	Two Rode Together	Yes	Yes			Columbia Pictures; with James Stewart, Richard Widmark, Shirley Jones; filmed in Eastmancolor.	
1962	The Man Who Shot Liberty Valance	Yes				Paramount Pictures; with John Wayne, James Stewart, Vera Miles, Woody Strode and Lee Marvin; based on the short story by Dorothy M. Johnson; added to the National Film Registry in 2007.	
1962	How the West Was Won	Yes				MGM; with (in the Ford segment) John Wayne, George Peppard; filmed in Cinerama and Technicolor; Ford directed the Civil War segment while Henry Hathaway and George Marshall directed the film's other segments; added to the National Film Registry in 1997.	
1963	Donovan's Reef	Yes	Yes			Paramount Pictures;with John Wayne, Elizabeth Allen, Lee Marvin; filmed in Technicolor; Wayne's final acting performance in a Ford film.	
1964	Cheyenne Autumn	Yes				Warner Bros.; with Richard Widmark, Carroll Baker, James Stewart; filmed in Super Panavision 70 and Technicolor on location in Monument Valley	
1966	7 Women	Yes				MGM; with Anne Bancroft, Sue Lyon, Margaret Leighton; filmed in Panavision and Metrocolor.	
1970	Chesty: A Tribute to a Legend	Yes				Documentary for the United States Marine Corps about General Lewis B. 'Chesty' Puller; narrated by John Wayne	

== Other film work ==
All films are feature length unless identified as a serial or short film. (Note: According to the rules of the Academy of Motion Picture Arts and Sciences, a feature-length motion picture has a running time of more than 40 minutes.) The silent shorts are identified as one, two, or three reels in length.

Year	Title	Producer	Actor	Writer	Other	Notes	References
1913	The Battle of Bull Run		Yes			Directed by and starring Francis Ford; two reels; survival status unknown.	
1914	Lucille Love, Girl of Mystery				Yes	With Grace Cunard, Francis Ford; John Ford: production assistant, prop man, stunts; 15-episode serial; incomplete prints exist of four episodes.	
1914	The Mysterious Rose		Yes			With Grace Cunard, Francis Ford; two reels; survival status unknown.	
1914	The D.A.'s Brother		Yes			With Grace Cunard, Francis Ford; two reels; survival status unknown.	
1914	A Study in Scarlet		Yes			With Francis Ford as Sherlock Holmes and John Ford as Dr. Watson; two reels; lost	
1915	The Birth of a Nation		Yes			With Lillian Gish, Mae Marsh, Henry B. Walthall; Epoch Film Corp.; directed by D. W. Griffith; Ford claimed to have played one of the clansmen; added to the National Film Registry in 1992.	
1915	And They Called Him Hero (fr)		Yes			With Grace Cunard, Francis Ford; two reels; survival status unknown.	
1915	Three Bad Men and a Girl		Yes			With Grace Cunard, Francis Ford; two reels; survival status unknown.	
1915	The Hidden City (fr)		Yes			With Grace Cunard, Francis Ford; two reels; survival status unknown.	
1915	Smuggler's Island (cy)		Yes			With Grace Cunard, Francis Ford; two reels; lost.	
1915	The Doorway of Destruction		Yes	Yes	Yes	With Francis Ford; two reels; John Ford: assistant director; lost.	
1915	The Broken Coin		Yes		Yes	With Grace Cunard, Francis Ford; directed by Francis Ford; 22-chapter serial; John Ford: assistant director; lost.	
1915	The Campbells Are Coming (cy)	Yes				With Grace Cunard, Francis Ford; directed by Francis Ford; survival status unknown.	
1916	Strong-Arm Squad (cy) (aka The Lumber Yard Gang)		Yes			Directed by and starring Francis Ford; two reels; survival status unknown.	
1916	The Adventures of Peg o' the Ring		Yes			With Grace Cunard, Francis Ford; directed by Francis Ford; 15-chapter serial; lost.	
1916	Chicken Hearted Jim		Yes			Directed by and starring Francis Ford; one reel; survival status unknown.	
1916	The Bandit's Wager (cy)		Yes			With Grace Cunard, Francis Ford; directed by Francis Ford; included on Criterion DVD and blu-ray releases of My Darling Clementine.	
1917	The Purple Mask (fr)		Yes			With Francis Ford, Grace Cunard; directed by Francis Ford; 16-chapter serial; John Ford supposedly acted in this; survives incomplete.	
1918	The Craving				Yes	Directed by and featuring Francis Ford; John Ford: assistant director; prints survive.	
1920	Under Sentence			Yes		Directed by Edward O'Fearna (brother of John Ford); two reels; survival status unknown.	
1922	Nero				Yes	Directed by J. Gordon Edwards; Ford worked as a 2nd unit director; lost.	
1927	7th Heaven				Yes	Directed by Frank Borzage; with Janet Gaynor, Charles Farrell; Ford was 2nd unit director.	
1927	What Price Glory				Yes	Directed by Raoul Walsh; with Victor McLaglen, Edmund Lowe, Dolores del Río; Ford was 2nd unit director.	
1929	Big Time		Yes			Directed by Kenneth Hawks; with Lee Tracy, Mae Clarke, Stepin Fetchit; Ford appears as himself.	
1936	The Last Outlaw			Yes		RKO Pictures; directed by Christy Cabanne; with Harry Carey, Hoot Gibson; based on an original story by Ford.	
1938	The Adventures of Marco Polo				Yes	Goldwyn-United Artists; directed by Archie Mayo; with Gary Cooper, Sigrid Gurie, Basil Rathbone; Ford directed some of the film's action sequences.	
1943	Show Business at War		Yes			Ford is shown working with the OSS in this wartime documentary short.	
1949	Mighty Joe Young	Yes				Argosy-RKO Pictures; directed by Ernest B. Schoedsack; with Terry Moore, Ben Johnson, Robert Armstrong; special effects by Willis H. O'Brien and Ray Harryhausen.	
1949	Pinky				Yes	20th Century Fox; directed by Elia Kazan; with Jeanne Crain, Ethel Barrymore; Ford was the original director but, due to illness, was replaced after one week by Kazan.	
1951	Bullfighter and the Lady				Yes	Republic Pictures; produced by John Wayne; directed by Budd Boetticher; with Robert Stack, Gilbert Roland; Ford edited this film as a favor to Wayne. (Note: Ford edited about 40 minutes out of Boetticher's original cut. In 1986, Boetticher's cut was restored.)	
1953	Hondo				Yes	Wayne-Fellows-Warner Bros.; directed by John Farrow; with John Wayne, Geraldine Page; filmed in 3-D and Warnercolor; based on the short story "The Gift of Cochise" by Louis L'Amour; Ford did some uncredited second-unit work.	
1960	The Alamo				Yes	Batjac-United Artists; produced and directed by John Wayne; with John Wayne, Richard Widmark, Laurence Harvey; Ford did some second unit work.	
1965	Young Cassidy				Yes	MGM; directed with Jack Cardiff; with Rod Taylor, Julie Christie; Ford began directing the film but was replaced during production by Cardiff, who received credit in the final print.	
1971	Vietnam! Vietnam!	Yes				Documentary for the United States Information Agency; narrated by Charlton Heston.	
1971	Directed by John Ford		Yes			Documentary directed by Peter Bogdanovich; narrated by Orson Welles; Ford was among the people interviewed.	
1971	John Ford: Memorial Day 1971		Yes			Documentary short featuring Ford.	

== Other media ==
=== Radio ===
Year	Program title	Episode title	Notes	Ref
1949	NBC Theater	"Stagecoach"	Aired: January 9 on NBC; John Wayne and Claire Trevor reprised their roles from the 1939 film. Ford appeared in a brief introduction.	
1949	Screen Directors Playhouse	"Fort Apache"	Aired: August 5 on NBC; John Wayne starred while Ford did a brief introduction.	
1950	The Rex Allen and Phillips 66 Show	—N/a	Ford appeared in a skit with singing cowboy star Rex Allen.	
1962	The Unreal West	—N/a	Aired: July 25 on CBC; Ford and John Wayne were among the people interviewed for this documentary series hosted by film historian Tony Thomas.	

=== Television ===
Year	Program title	Episode title	Notes	Ref
1955	The Jane Wyman Show	"Bamboo Cross"	Aired: December 6 on NBC; with Jane Wyman; directed by Ford.	
1955	Screen Directors Playhouse	"Rookie of the Year"	Aired: December 7 on NBC; with John Wayne, Ward Bond, Patrick Wayne; directed by Ford.	
1957	This Is Your Life	"This Is Your Life, Maureen O'Hara"	NBC; Ford was one of the guests.	
1958	Wide Wide World	"The Western"	Aired: June 8 on NBC; documentary series hosted by Dave Garroway; reputedly this episode was directed by Ford.	
1960	Wagon Train	"The Colter Craven Story"	Aired: November 23 on NBC; with Ward Bond, Robert Horton; directed by Ford. (Note: Ward Bond died of a heart attack shortly before this episode aired.)	
1962	Alcoa Premiere	"Flashing Spikes"	Aired: October 3 on ABC; with James Stewart, Jack Warden, Patrick Wayne; directed by Ford.	
1966	Cinéastes de notre temps ("Filmmakers of Our Times")	"Interview with John Ford"	Aired: June 6 on ORTF (Paris); interview with Ford in Hollywood on August 31, 1965.	
1968	Omnibus	"My Name is John Ford, I Make Westerns"	Aired: August on BBC; interview with Ford made in June 1968.	
1971	The American West of John Ford	—N/a	Documentary about Ford's western films; co-produced by his grandson, Dan Ford.	
1973	The American Film Institute Salute to John Ford	—N/a	Ford was the first recipient of the AFI Life Achievement Award.	

=== Stage ===
Year	Title	Notes	Ref
1949	What Price Glory	Ford directed this benefit performance for the Purple Heart Association. The cast included Ward Bond, Pat O'Brien, and Maureen O'Hara.	
