= The Trail of Hate =

The Trail of Hate may refer to:

- The Trail of Hate (1917 film), an American short drama film
- The Trail of Hate (1922 film), a lost silent feature western film
