= The Clever Mrs. Carfax =

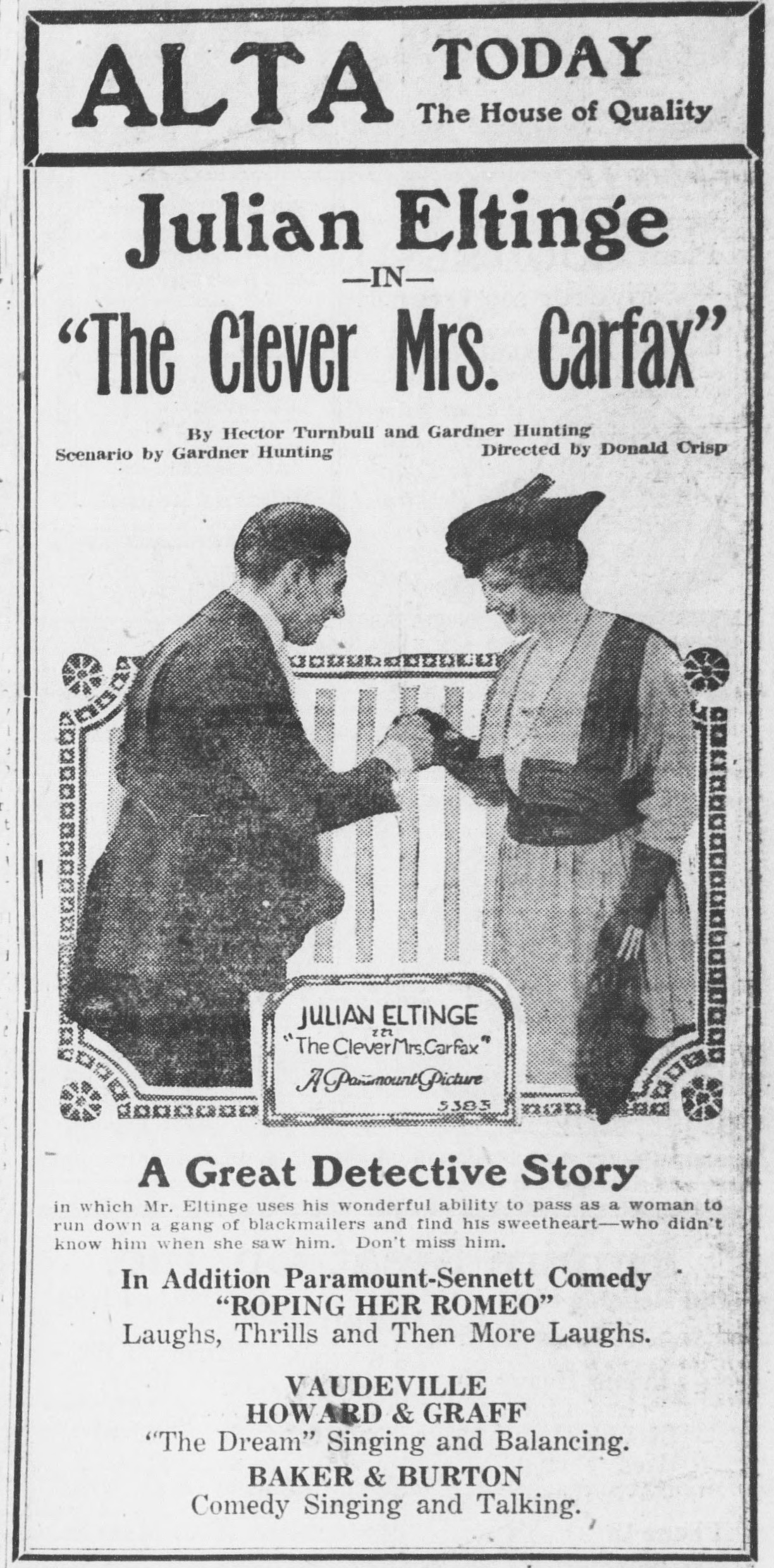
- Newspaper advertisement
- Directed by: Donald Crisp
- Screenplay by: Gardner Hunting; Hector Turnbull
- Produced by: Jesse L. Lasky
- Starring: Julian Eltinge; Daisy Jefferson; Noah Beery, Sr. Rosita Marstini; Jennie Lee; Fred Church
- Cinematography: Faxon M. Dean
- Production company: Jesse L. Lasky Feature Play Company
- Distributed by: Paramount Pictures
- Release date: November 5, 1917
- Running time: 50 minutes
- Country: United States
- Language: Silent (English intertitles)

The Clever Mrs. Carfax is a 1917 American comedy silent film directed by Donald Crisp and written by Gardner Hunting and Hector Turnbull. The film features female impersonator Julian Eltinge and stars Daisy Jefferson, Noah Beery, Sr., Rosita Marstini, Jennie Lee, and Fred Church. The film was released on November 5, 1917, by Paramount Pictures.

== Plot ==
As described in a film magazine, Billy Wise dares his friend Temple Trask to dress in women's garb and take luncheon with him at the club. Trask takes up the challenge and while dressed as Mrs. Carfax meets Helen Scott. Helen has a sickly grandmother who is afraid that her granddaughter will take all of her money, and so she puts her trust in two crooked hirelings. Trask recognizes the grandmother's secretary as a former jailbird and, realizing the situation, accompanies Helen and her grandmother home. Without letting his identity become known, Trask as himself and later as Mrs. Carfax discovers that Helen cares for him. At the grandmother's home, he can catch the secretary and maid with negotiable securities, trying to make good their escape. He then confesses his costume ruse to Helen, who would rather have him as Trask.

== Cast ==
- Julian Eltinge as Temple Trask / Mrs. Carfax
- Daisy Jefferson as Helen Scott
- Noah Beery, Sr. as Adrian Graw
- Rosita Marstini as Rena Varsey
- Jennie Lee as Mrs. Mary Keyes
- Fred Church as Billy Wise
- Mary Wise as Mrs. Bruce
- Fred De Shon as Trask's Valet
