= The Trail of Hate (1917 film) =

1917 film directed by John Ford

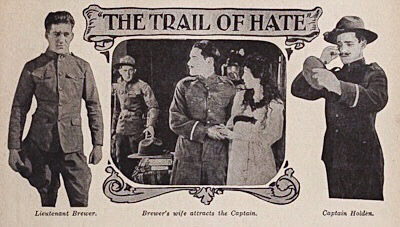
- Advertisement with John ("Jack") Ford (left), Louise Granville in still (center), and Duke Worne (far right)
- Directed by: John Ford (possibly Francis Ford)
- Written by: John Ford (likely adapted from 1914 serial by Francis Ford and Grace Cunard)
- Starring: John Ford
- Production company: Bison Motion Pictures
- Distributed by: Universal Film Manufacturing Company
- Release date: April 28, 1917
- Running time: 2 reels (approximately 25 minutes) (Note: According to the film reference How Movies Work by Bruce F. Kawin (New York: Macmillan Publishing Company, 1987, pp. 46-47), a 1000-foot theatrical reel of film in the silent era was generally projected at a speed of 16 frames per second, considerably slower than the 24 frames in the sound era. A full silent reel therefore had a maximum running time of 15-16 minutes. Most reels, especially the final reels in multiple-reel releases, were not filled to their maximum capacities.)
- Country: United States
- Language: Silent (English intertitles)

The Trail of Hate is a 1917 American silent drama film that portrayed the military exploits and personal rivalries of two United States Army officers stationed in the American West and later in the Philippines. The production starred John Ford, who at that time was credited as "Jack Ford". (Note: During the early part (1913-1924) of John Ford's film career, he was consistently identified in news items and film credits as "Jack Ford".) Currently classified as a lost film, this two-reel short is identified by some biographers of John Ford and in many filmographies, both in print and online, to be his second release as a director. He is also credited in various sources for writing the film's screenplay or "scenario". Other Ford biographers, however, most notably American director and film historian Peter Bogdanovich, credit this production's screenplay and its direction to John's older brother Francis Ford. (Note: Peter Bogdanovich also wrote and directed a documentary on Ford that includes extensive interviews with him, fellow directors, and with actors in his films. Titled Directed by John Ford, the film was originally released in 1971 and re-released in 2006.)

== Plot ==
Reviews published in 1917 provide general descriptions of this lost film's main characters as well as its storyline. Lieutenant Jack Brewer (John Ford) is described as a member of a company from the Sixty-Seventh Regiment of the United States Army and stationed at a fort in the American West during the first decade of the 20th century. (Note: The 1917 reviews of the short do not allude to the years in which the plot is set; nevertheless, the story appears to be a near-contemporary one. While giving allowances to the classic "Old West" holdup of a stage coach by mounted bandits, the style of the United States cavalry field uniforms in the film are early 20th-century, and the inclusive years of the Moro Rebellion are 1899-1913. The screenplay's events would therefore occur sometime between 1900 and 1910.) Brewer's troopers like him personally and admire him as well for earning his rank in action, by serving in the field and not simply by attending classes at a military academy. Some of Brewer's fellow officers, however, do not share such admiration for him, especially Captain Dana Holden (Duke Worne), a graduate of West Point. Soon the arrival of a beautiful young woman named Madge (Louise Granville) intensifies the animosity and tension between Brewer and his superior officer.

Madge and her father, traveling to the West by stagecoach, are stopped not far from the army fort and are robbed and detained by bandits. A detachment of troopers led by Brewer quickly pursues the robbers, but unfortunately Madge's father is killed in the ensuing skirmish, although she is rescued by the lieutenant and taken to the fort for her safety. After his mission, Brewer receives a month-long furlough, and upon his return he finds Madge still at the outpost working as a servant and looking unkempt and neglected. He helps her get better clothes and generally improves her living conditions. Brewer's attention toward Madge prompts a resentful Captain Holden to stir up gossip about his subordinate's intentions and the woman's behavior. To shield Madge from any further hint of scandal, Brewer asks her to marry him. She accepts his proposal even though she does not love him. After their wedding, Madge begins to flirt with Holden, and later Brewer catches them together when he returns early from evening duty. Not long after that incident, the captain is reassigned and leaves the fort. Madge accompanies him, abandoning her husband.

"Years later", now a captain, Brewer is redeployed for overseas duty in the Philippines, where American troops are battling the native Moro people, who are rebelling against the rule of their country by the United States. He leads his troops into the fight and learns that Captain Holden and Madge, who are now married, are also in the Philippines and are stationed at Fort Craig in the interior. Meanwhile, Holden has left his wife at the fort to go on a scouting expedition. He soon gets cut off from his men by rebel forces. Instead of trying to make his way back to the fort to warn the garrison and protect Madge, he chooses to save himself by heading to the city of Manila. The Moro now attack the fort; however, Brewer arrives in time with his company to rescue Madge once again and to repel the assault. Her former husband now escorts her to safety to the headquarters of the Philippine Constabulary. Appalled by Holden's cowardice and his self-serving decision to abandon her, she now begs Brewer to forgive her, pleading with him "to continue to protect her". He is disgusted by Madge's pleas, rejects them, and leaves her to rejoin his company.

== Cast ==
- Jack Ford as Lieutenant Jack Brewer
- Louise Granville as Madge
- Duke Worne as Captain Dana Holden
- Jack Lawton as "The Swede"

== Production and release ==
This production is recognized by some John Ford biographers and film references as the second of the first three films he directed during his long career. All three of those early directorial projects were Western shorts and were separately released over a period of three months in 1917: The Tornado on March 3, The Trail of Hate on April 28, and The Scrapper on June 9. Along with The Trail of Hate, the other two noted shorts are also currently classified as lost.

=== Questions regarding director and writing credits ===
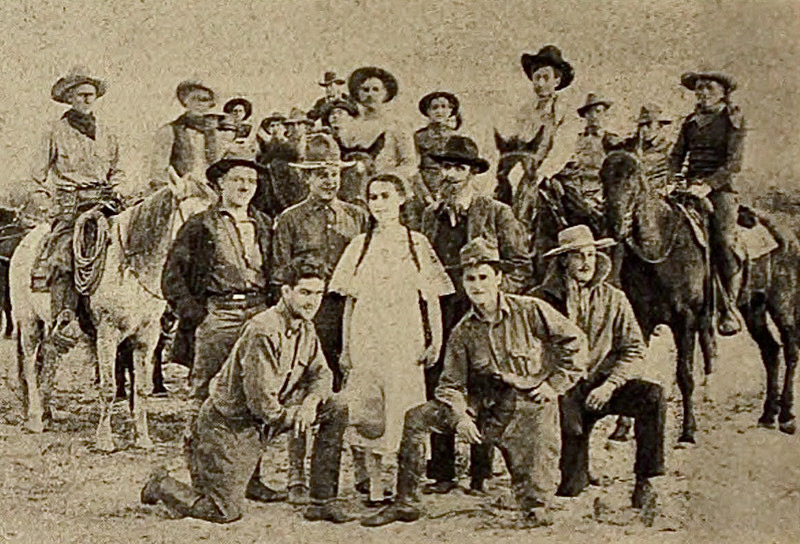
Original caption to 1917 image in The Moving Picture Weekly reads, "Jack Ford (kneeling at left) with his company"

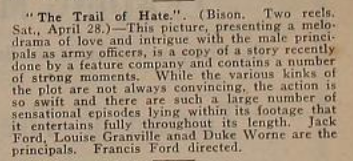
Motion Picture News credited Francis Ford as director in its issue of April 28, 1917.

In its May 19, 1917 issue—three weeks after the release of The Trail of Hate—the trade journal The Moving Picture Weekly informs its readers about "Jack Ford's Company" and features the adjacent photograph of Ford on set with cast members. The weekly trade journal heavily implies in its report that young Ford had already gained a reputation for being a hard-driving, demanding leader on set:

There are so many dare-devils in pictures, that it seems a difficult matter to award the palm of courage to any particular company of screen players. But certainly Jack Ford's would give the others a run for their money. This is the way they looked when they began work on Jack's picture, The Trail of Hate, but no one could induce them to pose after the picture was completed. When Jack has finished a picture his players are not fit for publication....

Although The Moving Picture Weekly in the preceding news item does not use the term "director" specifically, the publication's references to "Jack Ford's Company” and to "his players" certainly indicate that the trade journal identified Jack in command of production. A coming-attractions notice in an earlier issue of the same journal promotes the film and does highlight the credit "Directed by Jack Ford" in bold print. Then on April 21, just a week before the short's release, a full-page advertisement in The Moving Picture Weekly includes images of the film's main cast, along with comments about Jack Ford and the experience he had gained since 1914 as a self-professed "'Assistant Director'" working on serials for "that famous combination, Ford and Cunard". That "Ford" was Francis Ford, Jack's older brother; and the “Cunard" was the actress, screenwriter and director Grace Cunard. "This is the second time", the weekly journal continues, "[Jack] has been given a company and told to go ahead and do something with it", adding "What he accomplishes in 'The Trail of Hate' is quite worth while." Yet, despite those period credits given to Jack Ford and in later filmographies for five decades, a review in another 1917 trade publication and his own extensive research led director and Ford biographer and documentarian Peter Bogdanovitch to attribute the screenplay and direction of The Trail of Hate to Francis Ford, not to John. In his 1967 work titled simply John Ford, Bogdanovich refers to the April 28, 1917, issue of Motion Picture News, which carries a brief review of the Western short that concludes with the sentence, "Francis Ford directed." Bogdanovich in his book specifies the elder Ford as "Director-writer" of the 1917 short and cites the "similarities" in its story to plot points already used in Lucille Love, Girl of Mystery, a 15-episode serial directed by Francis just three years earlier and actually co-written by him with Grace Cunard. (Note: Unfortunately, only partial prints of just four of the 15 episodes that comprised the 1914 Ford-Cunard serial Lucille Love, Girl of Mystery survive.) Motion Picture News in the noted review alludes to that earlier screenplay for the serial’s episodes. "This picture", asserts the trade publication, "is a copy of a story recently done by a feature company".

In addition to the attribution to Francis in Motion Picture News and Bogdanovich's credits to him, other biographers of John Ford, such as Ronald L. Davis, Lindsay Anderson, and Andrew Sarris, exclude this short from his filmographies in their works. Biographer Andrew Sinclair in his volume on Ford does list The Trail of Hate in a filmography, but he places it under a subcategory titled "Films Made with Francis Ford As Director in Which John Ford Participated". Another authority on John Ford, Joseph McBride, qualifies crediting the legendary filmmaker for this production. In his 838-page biography of Ford published in 2001, Searching For John Ford: A Life, McBride leaves room for further debate on the issue by granting only that "Jack probably directed" it.

== Reception ==
Searches of 1917 newspapers and trade publications provide few news items or critical assessments about this short after its release, not uncommon for one- and two-reel productions when compared to the media’s coverage of the increasing number of much longer, more elaborate films being produced by then. The Moving Picture World in its brief assessment of the film on April 28, 1917 summarizes the plot and describes its action as "spirited" and engaging. "The construction is a little jerky in places," it reports, "but certain scenes lift it out of the ordinary, such as the stage holdup, ambush, attack on fort, etc." Motion Picture News found "various kinks" in the plot "unconvincing", while The Moving Picture Weekly characterized the picture as "virile" and assured "exhibitors" (theater owners) its "actions and plot development will make your audiences gasp." Tag Gallagher in his 1986 book John Ford: The Man and His Films quotes from a review in the April 28, 1917 issue of The Exhibitors Trade Review, which judges the short to be "'thrilling'" and "'teeming with life and color and action'".

== "Lost" film status ==
No full or partial reels of this Bison short are preserved in the Library of Congress, the UCLA Film Archives, in the collection of moving images at the Museum of Modern Art, the George Eastman Museum, or in other film repositories in the United States or Europe. The film is therefore classified as a lost production. Unfortunately, the images featured on this page are among very few that survive in period trade publications and provide at least some visual record of the production.
