= Jennie Lee (American actress) =

American actress

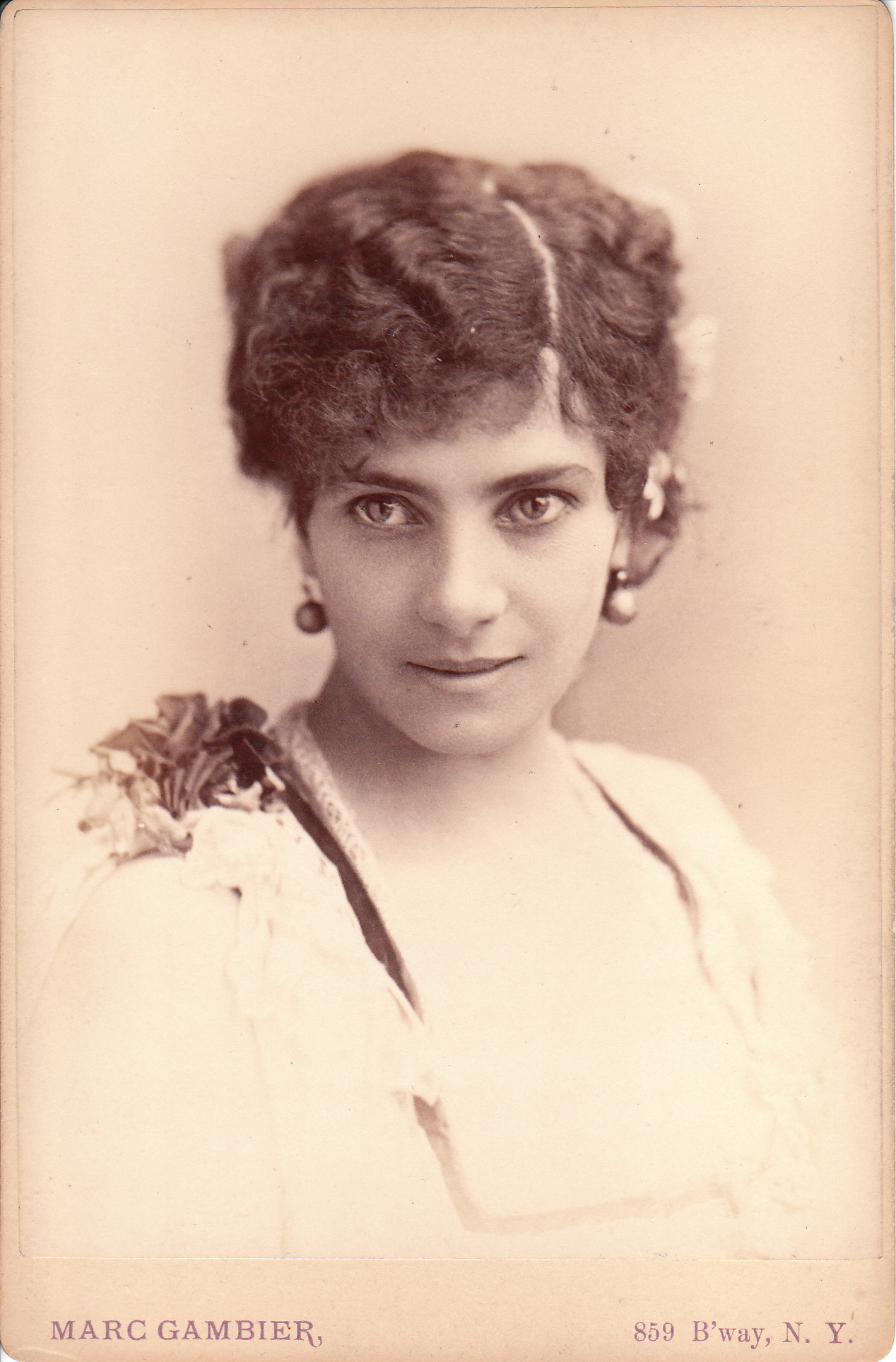
- Lee in the 1870s
- Born: September 4, 1848; Sacramento, California, U.S.
- Died: August 5, 1925 (aged 76); Hollywood, California, U.S.
- Years active: 1912-1924

Mary Jane Lee (September 4, 1848 – August 5, 1925; known professionally as Jennie Lee) was an American actress of the stage and screen.

Lee appeared in more than 50 films between 1912 and 1924, working especially in character parts under the directors John Ford and D. W. Griffith. She began her stage career at age nine and went on to support such actors as John Edward McCullough, Joseph Jefferson, Edwin Booth, and Helena Modjeska. She and her husband, actor William Courtright, appeared together in Griffith's Intolerance (1916). Lee portrayed Mammy in The Birth of a Nation (1915). Another notable performance of the actress occurs in Lloyd Ingraham's A Child of the Paris Streets, in which she portrays Madame Dufrane.

== Selected filmography ==
- The Mothering Heart (Griffith, 1913, Short) - The Wash Customer
- The Sorrowful Shore (Griffith, 1913, Short) - On Shore (uncredited)
- Two Men of the Desert (Griffith, 1913, Short) - Old Indian Woman
- The Battle at Elderbush Gulch (Griffith, 1913, Short) - The Waifs' Guardian
- The Yaqui Cur (1913) as Yaqui Woman
- Almost a Wild Man (1913) as In Audience
- Judith of Bethulia (Griffith, 1914) - Bethulian
- Brute Force (Griffith, 1914, Short) - Cavewoman
- The Birth of a Nation (Griffith, 1915) - Mammy - The Faithful Servant
- The Slave Girl (Browning, 1915, Short)
- Her Shattered Idol (1915) - Ben's Mother
- A Child of the Paris Streets (1916) - Madame Dufrane
- An Innocent Magdalene (Dwan, 1916) - Mammy
- Pillars of Society (1916) - Nurse (uncredited)
- Intolerance (1916) - Woman at Jenkins Employees Dance (uncredited)
- The Little Liar (1916) - Boardinghouse Keeper
- The Children Pay (Ingraham, 1916) - Susan - the Girls' Governess
- Nina, the Flower Girl (Ingraham, 1917) - Nina's grandmother
- Stage Struck (Morrissey, 1917) - Mrs. Teedles
- A Woman's Awakening (1917) - Mammie
- Her Official Fathers (1917) - Aunt Lydia
- Souls Triumphant (O'Brien, 1917)
- Madame Bo-Peep (1917) - Housekeeper
- The Innocent Sinner (1917) - Mother Ellis
- The Clever Mrs. Carfax (1917) - Mrs. Mary Keyes
- Sandy (1918) - Aunt Melvy
- Riders of Vengeance (Ford, 1919) - Harry's Mother
- Bill Henry (Storm, 1919) - Aunt Martha Jenkins
- Rider of the Law (Ford, 1919) - Jim's Mother
- The Secret Gift (1920) - Aunt Soiphie
- The Big Punch (Ford, 1921) - Buck's Mother
- One Man in a Million (1921) - Mrs. Koppel
- North of Hudson Bay (Ford, 1923) - Mother Dane
- Young Ideas (1924) - Grandma
- Hearts of Oak (Ford, 1924) - Grandma Dunnivan
