= The Tornado (1917 film) =

1917 film directed by John Ford

- Directed by: John Ford
- Written by: Grace Cunard; Francis Ford; John Ford
- Starring: John Ford
- Production company: Bison Motion Pictures
- Distributed by: Universal Film Manufacturing Company
- Release date: March 3, 1917
- Running time: 2 reels (approximately 25 minutes) (Note: According to How Movies Work by Bruce F. Kawin (Berkeley: University of California Press, 1987), a standard 1000-foot theatrical reel of film in the silent era was projected at a speed of 16 frames per second, considerably slower than the 24 frames in the sound era. A full silent reel therefore had an average running time a bit less than 15 minutes.)
- Country: United States
- Languages: Silent; English intertitles

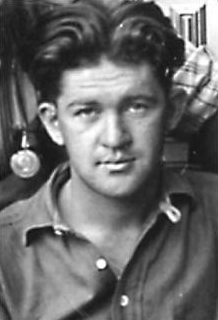
Jack Ford in 1915.

The Tornado is a 1917 American short film directed and co-written by John Ford, who at that time was credited as "Jack Ford". Filmed in California, the two-reel Western starred Ford as well, with a supporting cast that included Jean Hathaway, John Duffy, Peter Gerald, Elsie Thornton, and Duke Worne. This short is generally cited by film historians to be Ford's debut film as a director, although he had served as an assistant director in some earlier productions directed by his elder brother Francis Ford. Produced by Bison Motion Pictures and distributed by Universal Pictures, this short is currently classified as a lost film.

== Cast ==
- John Ford as Jack Dayton (as Jack Ford)
- Jean Hathaway as Jack's mother
- Peter Gerald as Pendleton, banker from Rock River (as Pete Gerald)
- Elsie Thornton as Bess, Jack's daughter
- Duke Worne as Lesparre, the lead of Cayote gang
- John Duffy as Slick, Jack's partner

== Production and reception ==
John Ford, who was only 23 years old at the time of this short's production, reportedly got drunk while filming and told producers that he simply ordered the actors what to do and then recorded the action.

=== Reviews ===
The film was defined like: "In his hand-to-hand struggle in the cabin and the jump from the cabin roof to the back of his horse, Jack Ford qualifies as a rough-riding expert". Jack Ford declared The Soul Herder as the first film he directed because he dismissed The Tornado and called it a "brunch of stunts".

== See also ==
- List of American films of 1917

== Bibliography ==
- Frankel, Glenn (2013). The Searchers: The Making of an American Legend. Bloomsbury Publishing. pp. 320. ISBN 9781620400647.
- Levy, Bill (1998). John Ford: A Bio-bibliography. Greenwood Publishing Group. p. 352. ISBN 9780313275142.
- Mitchell, George (March 1963). "The Films of John Ford". Films in Review. pp. 129–145.
