= Thieves' Gold =

1918 film directed by John Ford

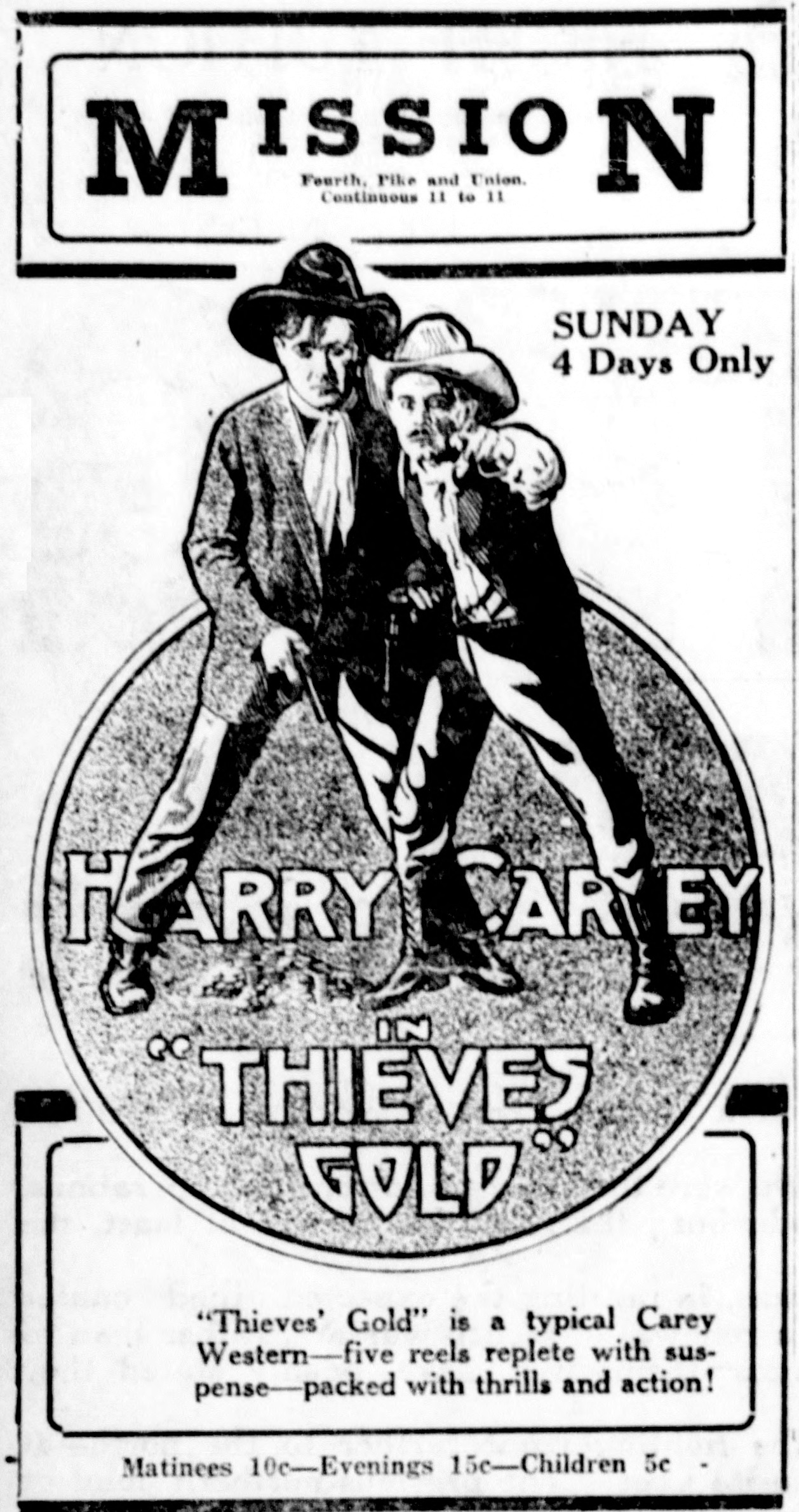
- Newspaper advertisement
- Directed by: John Ford
- Written by: Frederick R. Bechdolt; George Hively
- Starring: Harry Carey
- Cinematography: John W. Brown; Ben F. Reynolds
- Distributed by: Universal Film Manufacturing Company
- Release date: March 18, 1918
- Running time: 50 minutes
- Country: United States
- Languages: Silent; English intertitles

Thieves' Gold is a lost 1918 American silent Western film directed by John Ford and featuring Harry Carey.

== Plot ==
Cheyenne Harry tries to help his outlaw friend Padden evade arrest after Padden has drunkenly shot another man. In the end, the two mismatched friends fight it out, leaving Padden dead. In a romantic subplot, Harry's fiancée Alice leaves him, but finally returns.

== Cast ==
- Harry Carey as Harry "Cheyenne Harry" Henderson
- Molly Malone as Alice Norris
- John Cook as Uncle Larkin
- Martha Mattox as Mrs. Larkin
- Vester Pegg as Curt Simmons/"Padden"
- Harry Tenbrook as Colonel Betoski
- Helen Ware as Mrs. Savage
- L. M. Wells as Savage
- Millard K. Wilson as Undetermined Role

== Production ==
Thieves' Gold was released as a Universal Special Feature in 1918. It was a 50-minute silent film on five reels, part of the "Cheyenne Harry" series of film featurettes. The original story, "Back to the Right Train" by Frederick R. Bechdolt, was adapted for the screen by scenarist George Hively. This installment of "Cheyenne Harry" won notably negative reviews by critics at the time of its release.

== Censorship ==
Like many American films of the time, Thieves' Gold was subject to cuts by city and state film censorship boards. For example, the Chicago Board of Censors cut, in Reel 2, six scenes of women at bar and women drinking, flashed two scenes of tough dancing by Cheyenne Harry and young woman, Harry shooting a Mexican, Reel 4, four holdup scenes, Reel 5, shooting of Padden, two scenes of Harry shooting.

Before the film could be exhibited in Kansas, the Kansas Board of Review required the removal of most of the same scenes as the Chicago Censors.

== Preservation ==
With no holdings located in archives, Thieves' Gold is considered a lost film.

== See also ==
- John Ford filmography
- Harry Carey filmography
- List of lost films
