= Riders of Vengeance =

1919 film directed by John Ford

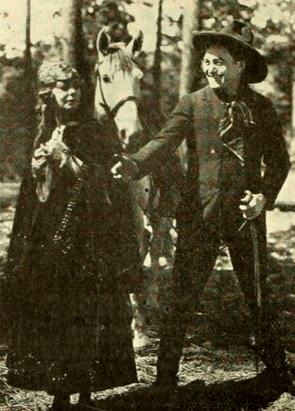
- Still with Owen and Carey
- Directed by: John Ford
- Written by: Harry Carey; John Ford; Eugene B. Lewis
- Produced by: Pat Powers
- Starring: Harry Carey
- Cinematography: John W. Brown
- Distributed by: Universal Pictures
- Release date: June 9, 1919
- Running time: 60 minutes
- Country: United States
- Languages: Silent; English intertitles

Riders of Vengeance is a 1919 American Western film directed by John Ford and featuring Harry Carey. The film is considered to be lost.

== Plot ==
Harry's bride is murdered at their wedding along with Harry's mother and father, and the good-hearted outlaw turns grimly malevolent. He leaves town, only to return one year later. One by one he stalks his wife's killers, dispatching them all until he finally sets his sights, mistakenly, on Sheriff Gale Thurman. The lawman bests Harry and keeps him hiding outside town in the wilderness. Straying into the same wilderness, the Sheriff's girlfriend is first overtaken by highwaymen, then rescued by Harry, only to be taken captive by Harry when he realizes who she is. At first threatening to harm the girl, Harry slowly falls in love with her, all while hostile Apaches attempt to kill them both. By the time the Sheriff tracks them down, a full-scale assault is under way, and the two men join forces. Harry realizes the Sheriff's innocence, but it is too late: the lawman is dead from his battle wounds, but he has saved his girlfriend - and Harry.

== Cast ==
- Harry Carey as Harry "Cheyenne Harry" Henderson
- Seena Owen as The Girl
- Joe Harris as Gale Thurman (credited as Joseph Harris)
- J. Farrell MacDonald as Buell
- Alfred Allen as Harry's Father
- Jennie Lee as Harry's Mother
- Clita Gale as Virginia
- Vester Pegg
- Betty Schade
- Millard K. Wilson (credited as M.K. Wilson)

== Production ==
Riders of Vengeance was released as a Universal Special feature in June 1919, a 60-minute silent film on six reels. It was part of the long-running "Cheyenne Harry" series of film featurettes. The story was an uncommon collaboration between the star Harry Carey and the director John Ford (with help from scenarist Eugene Lewis). Though it has an unusually high level of violence ("lots of killings", as Moving Picture World noted), critical reviews of the time lavishly praised both the story and film.

== See also ==
- John Ford filmography
- Harry Carey filmography
- List of lost films
