= Chesty: A Tribute to a Legend =

- Directed by: John Ford
- Produced by: James Ellsworth
- Starring: Chesty Puller
- Narrated by: John Wayne
- Cinematography: Brick Marquard
- Release date: 1976
- Running time: 47 minutes
- Country: United States
- Language: English
- Budget: $225,000

Chesty: A Tribute to a Legend is a documentary directed by John Ford and narrated by John Wayne. Filming was completed in 1970, but the film was not released until 1976, three years after Ford's death.

It was the final film directed by John Ford.

== Overview ==
The documentary about United States Marine General Lewis B. "Chesty" Puller, the most decorated Marine in US history, was made for television. Filming commenced in August 1968 at Puller's Virginia home and was completed on April 8, 1970. Ford had met Puller in Korea and was a tentmate and became close friends.

Both Ford and John Wayne make an appearance. The last scene that Ford ever shot was the segment featuring Wayne, shot on the set of Rio Lobo in Tucson, Arizona, the night after Wayne had received the Academy Award for Best Actor for True Grit.

The film was originally an hour long but was initially cut to 30 minutes by Ford's editor, Leon Selditz, with approval by Ford.

It contains a Marine Corps tribute to Puller, filmed on January 28, 1969 at the Marine Barracks, Washington, D.C. Variety claimed that the sequence contained almost certainly Ford's only zoom shot in one of his films, given his hatred of the zoom lens.
