= Jack Duffy (actor) =

American actor

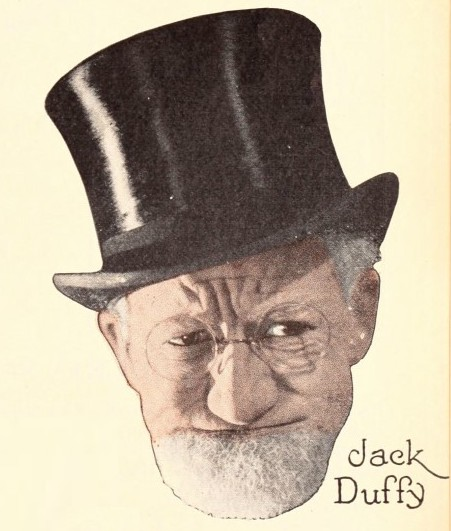
- Duffy in a selection from an advertisement in Motion Picture News, 1926
- Born: September 4, 1882; Pawtucket, Rhode Island, United States
- Died: July 23, 1939 (aged 56); Hollywood, California, United States
- Occupation: Actor
- Years active: 1916-1937

Jack Duffy (September 4, 1882 – July 23, 1939) was an American film actor. He appeared in more than 80 films between 1916 and 1937, usually looking older than his age with his make-up. He acted in a series of silent shorts for the Christie Film Company, a pioneering movie studio that specialized in producing situational comedies, but also appeared in some Buster Keaton comedies. When his acting career declined in the early 1930s, he continued to work in his dual capacity of make-up artist. Duffy was born in Pawtucket, Rhode Island, and died in Hollywood, California. His sister was actress Kate Price.

== Filmography ==
Year	Title	Role	Notes
1916	The Adventures of Peg o' the Ring		
1918	A Dog's Life	Man in Dance Hall	Short, Uncredited
1919	Blackie's Redemption	The Dove	
1919	Lord and Lady Algy	Minor Role	
1920	The Backyard		Short
1920	Neighbors	The Judge	Short
1923	Our Hospitality	Sam Gardner	Uncredited
1924	Reckless Romance	Grandpa	
1924	The Brass Bowl	O'Hagan	
1925	Stop Flirting	Joseph - the Butler	
1925	Madame Behave	M.T. House	
1926	Ella Cinders	Fire Chief	
1927	No Control	Noah Flood	
1928	Harold Teen	Grandpop Teen	
1928	Hot Scotch	Sandy MacDuff	Short
1929	Divorce Made Easy	Uncle Todd	
1929	Sally	Roue	
1932	Love in High Gear	Hotel Proprietor	
1933	Alice in Wonderland	Leg of Mutton	Uncredited
1935	Texas Terror	Jake Abernathy	
1935	George White's 1935 Scandals	Bearded Man	Uncredited
1935	Welcome Home	Rube	Uncredited
1935	Trails End	Deke	
1935	Here Comes Cookie	Wilbur	Uncredited
1935	Keystone Hotel	Man with Ear Trumpet	Short, Uncredited
1935	She Couldn't Take It	Farmer	Uncredited
1936	Wild Brian Kent	Old-Time Fireman	
1937	The Gold Racket	Hinkle	
1937	Love Takes Flight	Bartender	
