= Roped =

1919 film directed by John Ford

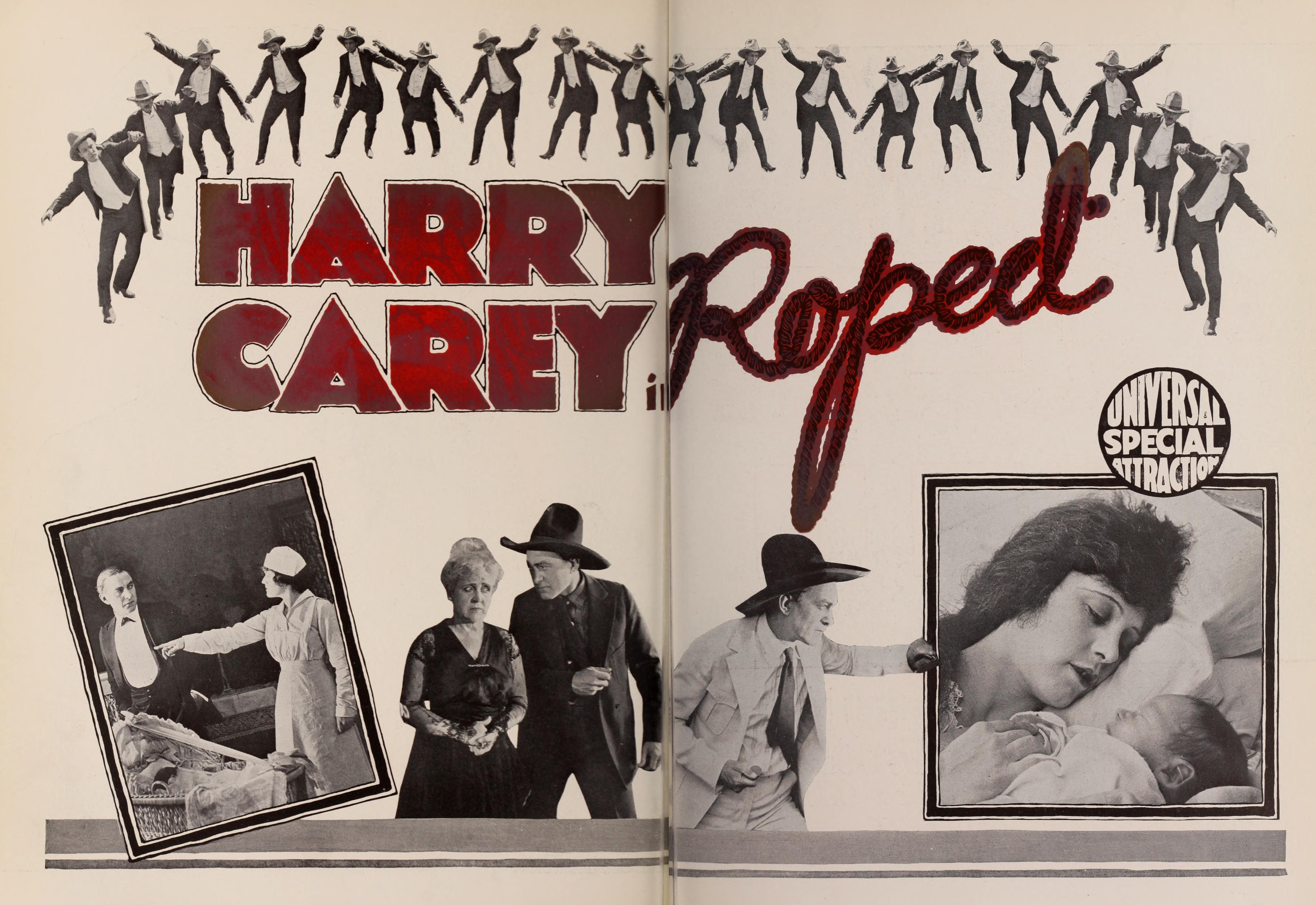
- Magazine advertisement
- Directed by: John Ford
- Screenplay by: Eugene B. Lewis
- Story by: Eugene B. Lewis
- Starring: Harry Carey
- Cinematography: John W. Brown
- Distributed by: Universal Film Manufacturing Company
- Release date: January 13, 1919
- Running time: 60 minutes
- Country: United States
- Languages: Silent; English intertitles

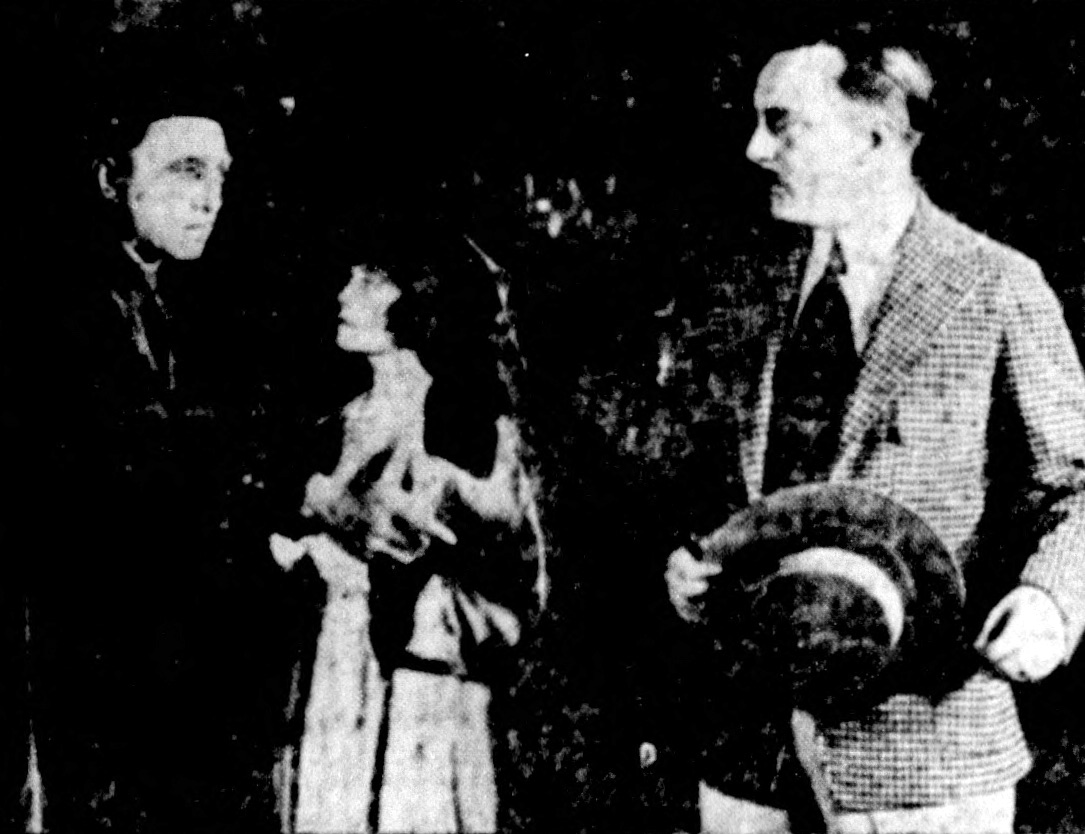
Scene from the film

Roped was a 1919 American Western-comedy film directed by John Ford and featuring Harry Carey. The film is considered to be lost. Roped is one of at least 25 films in which director John Ford and actor Harry Carey collaborated on between the years of 1917 and 1921. Ford saw Carry as a mentor and their worked on the story ideas for several of their films together.

During these collaborations, Carey made more per film then Ford. By 1919, the year Roped came out, Ford was making $300 a week; Carey was making $1,250. This differential in pay led to tension between the two.

== Plot ==
Cheyenne Harry is a wealth ranch owner. After his cowboys put an ad in the newspaper trying to find him a wife, Harry marries Aileen Judson-Brown. A year into their marriage, Aileen gives birth to their first child. The new family live with Aileen's status seeking mother, Mrs. Judson-Brown. Mrs. Judson-Brown tries everything in her power to break up the marriage so her daughter can marry the wealthier Ferdie Van Duzen. Mrs. Judson-Brown steals Harry and Aileen's baby and tells Harry that Aileen no longer loves him and their baby has died. Heart broken, Harry moves out west.

Harry receives news from Mrs. Judson-Brown's butler that his baby is still alive. Harry finds his child and Aileen confesses her true love. The film ends with the reunited family heading West together, leaving Harry's hateful mother-in-law behind.

== Cast ==
- Harry Carey as Harry "Cheyenne Harry" Henderson
- Neva Gerber as Aileen
- Mollie McConnell as Mrs. Judson-Brown (credited as Molly McConnell)
- Arthur Shirley as Ferdie Van Duzen
- J. Farrell MacDonald as The Butler

== See also ==
- Harry Carey filmography
- John Ford filmography
- List of lost films
