= Hearts of Oak (film) =

1924 film directed by John Ford

- Directed by: John Ford
- Written by: James A. Herne (play); Charles Kenyon (screenplay)
- Starring: Hobart Bosworth; Pauline Starke
- Cinematography: George Schneiderman
- Distributed by: Fox Film Corporation
- Release date: October 5, 1924
- Running time: 50 minutes
- Country: United States
- Languages: Silent; English intertitles

Hearts of Oak is a 1924 American drama film based upon the play of the same name by James A. Herne and directed by John Ford. The film is considered to be lost.

== Cast ==
- Hobart Bosworth as Terry Dunnivan
- Pauline Starke as Chrystal
- Theodore von Eltz as Ned Fairweather
- James Gordon as John Owen
- Francis Powers as Grandpa Dunnivan
- Jennie Lee as Grandma Dunnivan
- Francis Ford
- Frances Teague as Bridesmaid

== See also ==
- List of lost films
- 1937 Fox vault fire
