= The Adventures of Peg o' the Ring =

1916 film

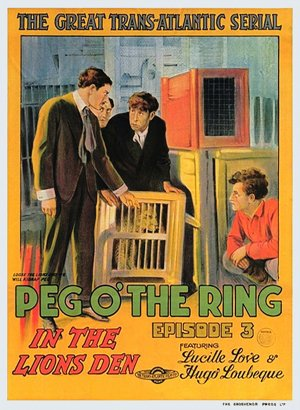
- Theatrical poster to The Adventures of Peg o' the Ring
- Directed by: Francis Ford; Jacques Jaccard
- Written by: Joe Brandy; Grace Cunard
- Starring: Grace Cunard; Francis Ford
- Distributed by: Universal Film Manufacturing Co.
- Release date: May 1, 1916
- Running time: 300 minutes (15 episodes)
- Country: United States
- Language: Silent (English intertitles)

The Adventures of Peg o' the Ring is a 1916 American drama film serial directed by Francis Ford and Jacques Jaccard. It is now considered to be lost.

== Cast ==
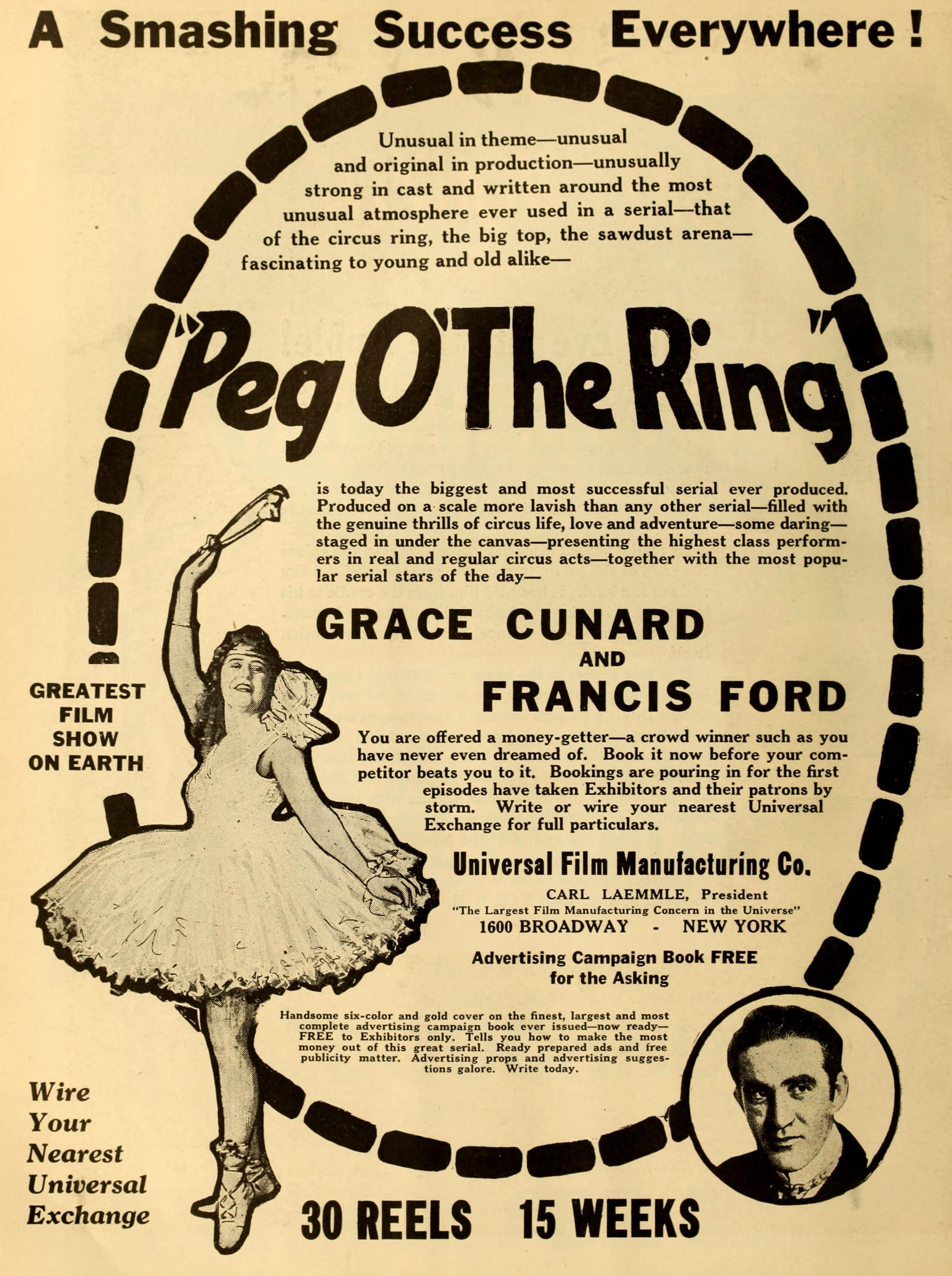
Peg O' The Ring ad

- Grace Cunard as Peg
- Francis Ford as Dr. Lund, Junior
- Mark Fenton as Dr. Lund, Senior (credited as Marc Fenton)
- G. Raymond Nye
- Peter Gerald as Flip The Clown (credited as Pete Gerald)
- Jean Hathaway as Mrs. Lund
- Charles Munn
- Irving Lippner as Marcus, The Hindoo
- Jack Duffy
- John Ford as Lund's Accomplice (credited as Jack Ford)
- Lionel Bradshaw
- Eddie Polo (scenes deleted)
- Ruth Stonehouse (scenes deleted; but stills of her in the film survive)

== Chapter titles ==
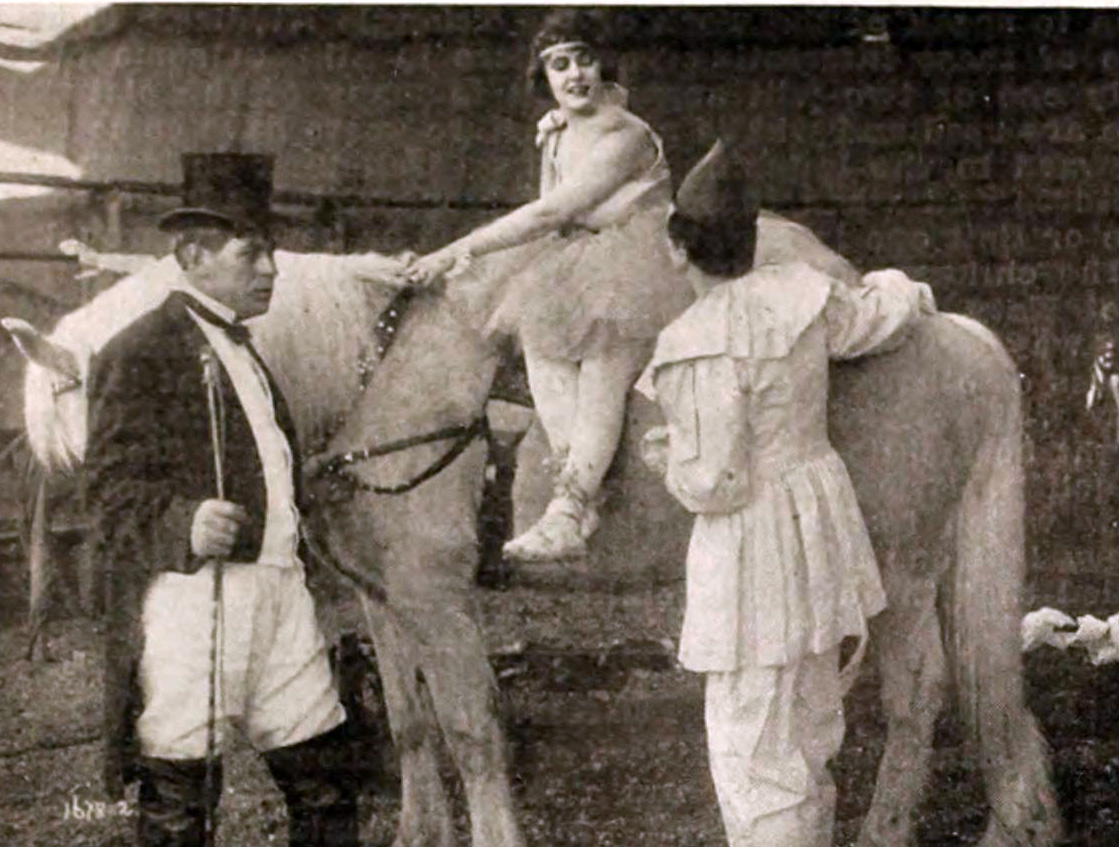
Film still

1. The Leopard's Mark
2. A Strange Inheritance
3. In The Lion's Den
4. The Circus Mongrels
5. The House of Mystery
6. The Cry For Help or Cry of The Ring
7. The Wreck
8. Outwitted
9. The Leap
10. In the Hands of The Enemy
11. The Stampede
12. On The High Seas
13. The Clown Act
14. The Will
15. Retribution

== See also ==
- List of film serials
- List of film serials by studio
- List of lost films
