= Three Mounted Men =

1918 film directed by John Ford

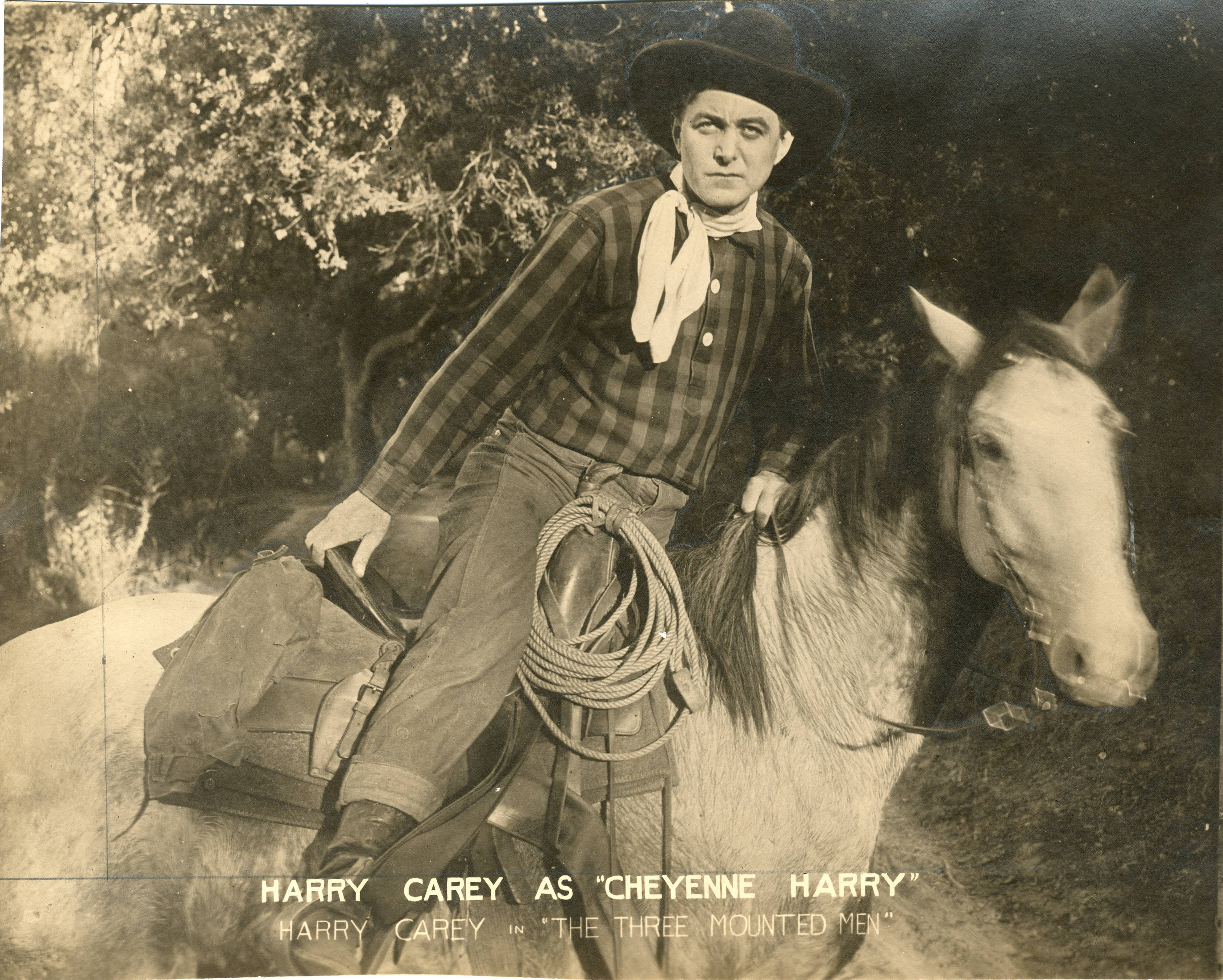
- Carey in the film
- Directed by: Jack Ford
- Screenplay by: Eugene B. Lewis
- Story by: Eugene B. Lewis
- Starring: Harry Carey
- Cinematography: John W. Brown; Ben F. Reynolds
- Distributed by: Universal Film Manufacturing Company
- Release date: October 7, 1918
- Running time: 60 minutes
- Country: United States
- Language: Silent (English intertitles)

Three Mounted Men is a lost 1918 American silent Western film directed by John Ford (credited as Jack Ford) and featuring Harry Carey.

== Plot ==
As described in a film magazine, Cheyenne Harry is promised his liberty from prison if he will capture "dead or alive" Buck Masters, a worthless and desperate character. Harry agrees, and in short order he has won the confidence of the bad man and they agree to hold up the night stage coach. Harry tips off the sheriff and the tough is caught. Harry then finds that this has robbed a poor girl, Lola, and her mother of their only support. Harry relents and, with his two pals, they kidnap the thief from the sheriff's automobile and make off with him. Harry rides off to begin life anew with Lola, the desperado's sister.

== Cast ==
- Harry Carey as Harry "Cheyenne Harry" Henderson
- Joe Harris as Buck Masters
- Neva Gerber as Lola Masters
- Harry Carter as The Warden's Son
- Ruby Lafayette as Mrs. Masters
- Charles Hill Mailes as The Warden
- Mrs. Anna Townsend as Harry's Mother
- Ella Hall as Undetermined Role

== Reception ==
Like many American films of the time, Three Mounted Men was subject to cuts by city and state film censorship boards. For example, the Chicago Board of Censors required a cut, in Reel 1, of the last choking scene, Reel 2, the second part of the letter beginning with "If you try to get me" etc., Reel 4, one scene of a young woman at the bar, Reel 5, the two intertitles "I am going to prove I am your friend" etc. and "The stage will reach Red Gulch at nine o'clock", and, Reel 6, the first stage holdup scene.

== Preservation ==
With no holdings located in archives, Three Mounted Men is considered a lost film.

== See also ==
- Harry Carey filmography
- List of lost films
