= A Woman's Fool =

1918 film directed by John Ford

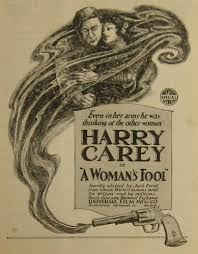
- Film poster
- Directed by: John Ford
- Written by: George Hively (scenario)
- Based on: Lin McLean by Owen Wister
- Starring: Harry Carey
- Cinematography: Ben F. Reynolds
- Distributed by: Universal Film Manufacturing Company
- Release date: August 15, 1918
- Running time: 50 minutes
- Country: United States
- Languages: Silent; English intertitles

A Woman's Fool is a 1918 American silent Western film directed by John Ford featuring Harry Carey. The film is considered to be lost.

== Plot ==
As described in a film magazine, Lin McLean (Carey), a cowboy, is a fool where women are concerned. He befriends Katie Lusk (Schade), a Denver "biscuit shooter", only to be rejected. Dishearted, he picks up a homeless boy, Tommy Lusk (Pegg), off the Denver streets and makes a pal of him. He learns that the boy's mother is none other than the woman who rejected him. Katy comes back into his life, vowing that she really loves him, but Lin has met Jessamine Buckner (Malone), the new station agent in the small town near where he works, and Lin realizes that she is the right woman. Katy commits suicide and Lin, Jessamine, and the boy start a new life together.

== Cast ==
- Harry Carey as Lin McLean
- Betty Schade as Katie Lusk
- Molly Malone as Jessamine Buckner (credited as Mollie Malone)
- Millard K. Wilson as "The Virginian"
- Ed Jones as "Honey" Wiggin
- Vester Pegg as Tommy Lusk
- William A. Carroll as Lusk
- Roy Clark as Billy
- Sam De Grasse as Undetermined Role

== See also ==
- Harry Carey filmography
- List of lost films
