= Ace of the Saddle =

1919 film directed by John Ford

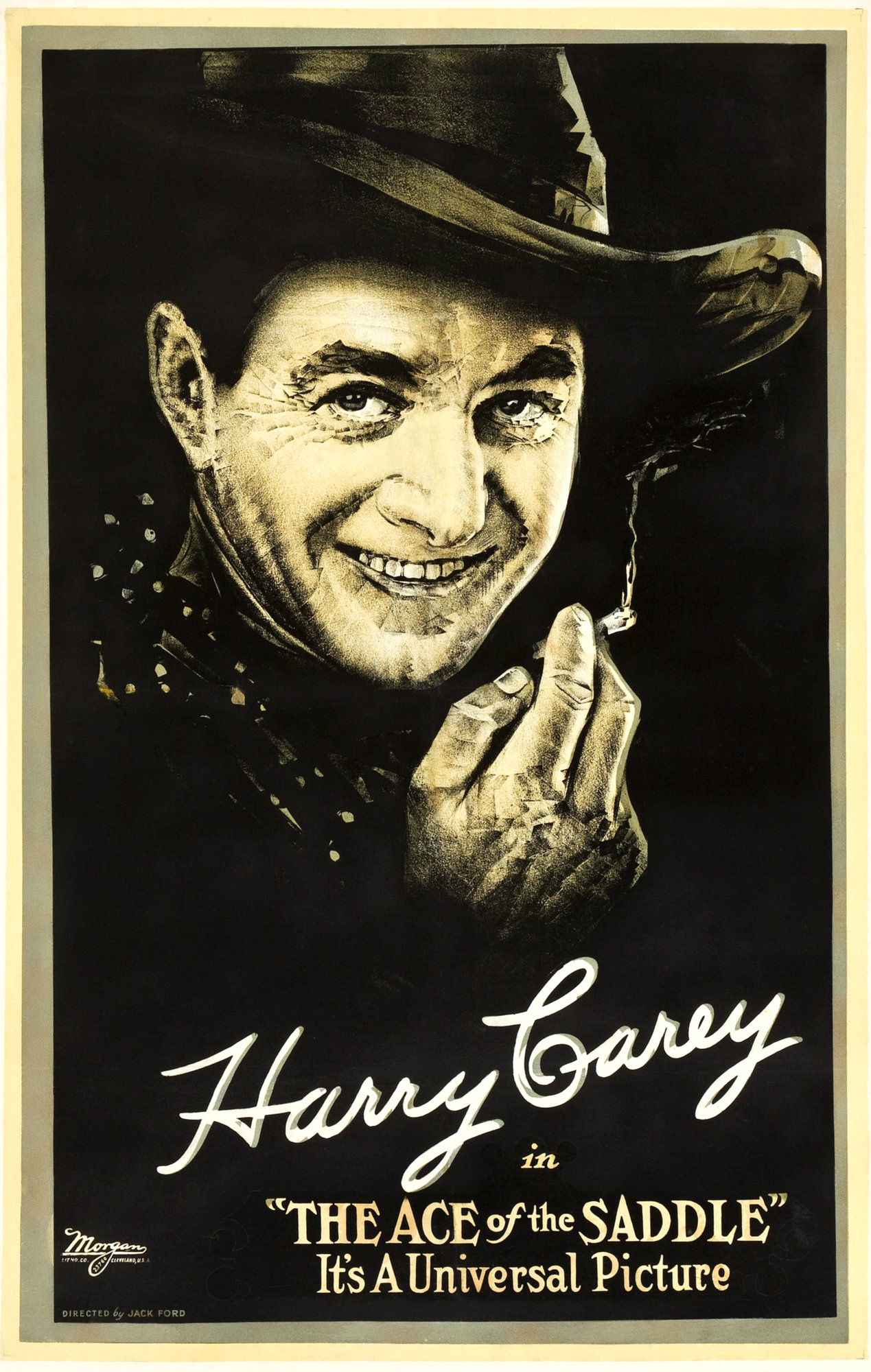
- Film poster
- Directed by: John Ford
- Written by: George Hively; Frederick J. Jackson
- Produced by: Pat Powers
- Starring: Harry Carey
- Cinematography: John W. Brown
- Distributed by: Universal Film Manufacturing Company
- Release date: August 18, 1919
- Running time: 60 minutes
- Country: United States
- Languages: Silent; English intertitles

Ace of the Saddle is a lost 1919 American silent Western film directed by John Ford and featuring Harry Carey.

== Plot ==
As described in a film magazine, Cheyenne Harry Henderson owns a cattle ranch on the border of two counties, with Yucca County controlled by outlaws and Pinkerton County law abiding. After the Yucca sheriff refuses to help stop the cattle rustling, he goes to Pinkerton Sheriff Faulkner, who is unable to help him because he lives in Yucca County. Harry meets and becomes romantically involved with Sheriff Faulkner's daughter Madeline, who is also loved by the Yucca sheriff. Because she hates guns, Harry gives up using them. While Yucca County may be lawless, no man may be shot unless he is armed, so the Yucca sheriff devises a scheme place an unloaded gun in Harry's hands and then have him killed. Harry sees through the ruse and uses the sheriff's gun to kill two men before they can shoot him. Harry then moves his house over the county border onto Pinkerton County, and with the aid of Sheriff Faulkner two rustlers are captured. Before the rustlers can be hanged, the Yucca sheriff frees them and also kidnaps Madeline. Harry then gets his guns and goes to rescue her.

== Cast ==
- Harry Carey as Harry "Cheyenne Harry" Henderson
- Joe Harris as Yucca County Sheriff
- Duke R. Lee as Pinkerton County Sheriff Faulkner
- Peggy Pearce as Madeline Faulkner
- Jack Walters as "Inky" O'Day
- Vester Pegg as Gambler
- William Courtright as Storekeeper (credited as William Cartwright)
- Zoe Rae as Child

== Preservation ==
With no holdings located in archives, The Ace of the Saddle is considered a lost film.

== See also ==
- List of American films of 1919
- Harry Carey filmography
- List of lost films
