= The Fighting Brothers =

1919 film directed by John Ford

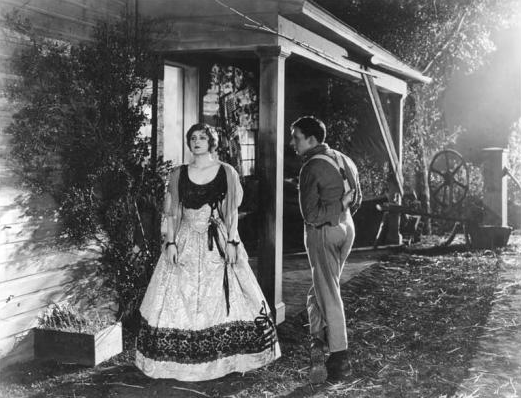
- Directed by: John Ford
- Written by: George Hively; George C. Hull
- Starring: Pete Morrison
- Cinematography: John W. Brown
- Production company: Universal Film Manufacturing Company
- Distributed by: Universal Film Manufacturing Company
- Release date: March 1, 1919
- Running time: 20 minutes
- Country: United States
- Languages: Silent; English intertitles

The Fighting Brothers is a 1919 American short silent Western film directed by John Ford. The film is now considered to be lost.

== Plot ==
According to a film magazine, "Into the little town of Rosalia, Arizona, came two strangers, "Cheyenne Harry" and his "buddy," "Lonnie." The town welcomed the two men and soon found in "Cheyenne" the material for a sheriff. And into the life of Lonnie came Conchita, beautiful girl of the town, and the enamorata [sic] of Ben Crawley, the defeated candidate for sheriff and "Cheyenne's" one enemy in the town. Learning of Lonnie's infatuation for the woman, "Cheyenne" warns him against her, but Lonnie refuses to listen. And then came high noon in the lives of the two brothers.

"Cheyenne" tells Lonnie that his affair with Conchita must stop. Lonnie resents his interference. "Cheyenne" points out to Lonnie that Conchita is only making a fool of him and tells him of Crawley. Lonnie will not believe and, resenting "Cheyenne's" insinuations, the brothers come to blows. "Cheyenne" is worsted and, leaving him unconscious, Lonnie goes to Conchita. Crawley comes to her cabin and sees her in Lonnie's arms. Intending to kill Lonnie, he fires, but the bullet strikes Conchita and she falls.

"Cheyenne" recovers and goes to the cabin. Conchita accuses Lonnie of shooting her and dies. Crawley makes his escape. "Cheyenne" places Lonnie under arrest. Crawley incites the men of the town to lynch Lonnie, but the cooler minds prevail and he is jailed. "Cheyenne" is warned that he had better get Lonnie out of town and to the penitentiary to avoid trouble, and he starts with Lonnie for the nearby State prison. Through a falsehood Crawley leads the men to believe that ''Cheyenne" is double-crossing them and escaping with Lonnie, and they determine to overtake him and lynch Lonnie. Arriving at the pen, "Cheyenne" delivers Lonnie to the warden, takes a receipt for him and then suddenly throws his badge to the floor and tells the warden that as sheriff he has done his duty, but as Lonnie's brother he is going to aid him to escape.

A fierce fight takes place in the prison. Lonnie makes his escape and leaps from the prison wall to his horse and rides away while "Cheyenne" holds the warden and the guards at bay. The men from the town arrive and upon learning that Crawley had lied to them turn upon him angrily. Lonnie, making his escape, meets one of the men from the town, who, after the others had left, had obtained evidence of Crawley's guilt and had ridden with it to the pen. Lonnie returns with the man to the prison. Crawley is jailed and Lonnie freed, and "Cheyenne" is forced to resume his duties as sheriff."

== Cast ==
- Pete Morrison as Sheriff Pete Larkin
- Hoot Gibson as Lonnie Larkin
- Yvette Mitchell as Conchita
- Jack Woods as Ben Crawly
- Duke R. Lee as "Slim"

== See also ==
- List of American films of 1919
- Hoot Gibson filmography
