= A Fight for Love =

1919 film directed by John Ford

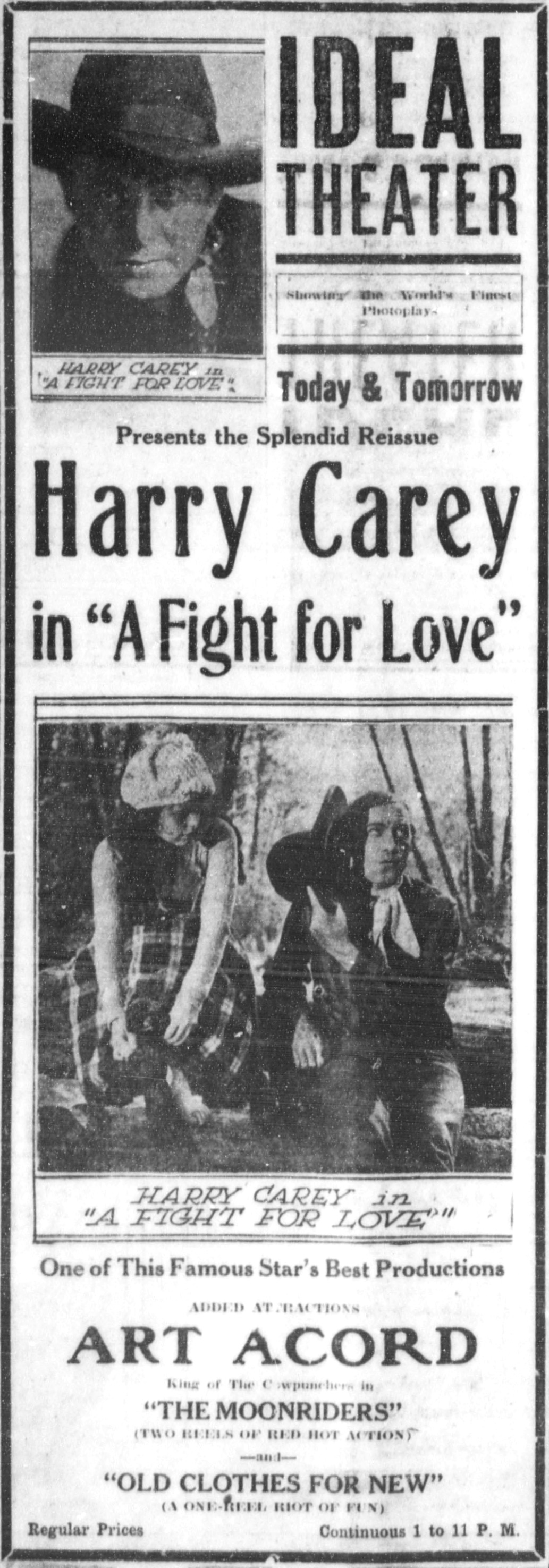
- Newspaper advertisement
- Directed by: John Ford
- Screenplay by: Eugene B. Lewis
- Story by: Eugene B. Lewis
- Produced by: Pat Powers
- Starring: Harry Carey
- Cinematography: John W. Brown; Ben F. Reynolds
- Distributed by: Universal Studios
- Release date: March 24, 1919
- Running time: 60 minutes
- Country: United States
- Languages: Silent; English intertitles

A Fight for Love was a 1919 American Western film directed by John Ford and featuring Harry Carey. The film is considered to be lost.

== Plot ==
As described in a film magazine, Cheyenne Harry (Carey) has a sheriff and posse on his trail because of his knowledge of a cattle rustling incident and makes a dash for safety across the Canada–US border. When the posse stops at the border, he calmly waves his gun and rolls a cigarette. The sheriff, however, has contacted the Canadian Mounted Police, and they are soon watching Harry. He finds refuge with a band of Indians, but then clashes over an Indian girl (May) with Black Michael (Harris), leader of a gang of whiskey runners. Harry's real love is with Kate (Gerber), daughter of local trader Angus McDougal (Fenton). However, his rival here is also Black Michael. Michael kills an Indian and abducts Kate, but Harry follows and rescues her. Harry beats Michael in a terrific fight, with Michael confessing to his crimes before dying.

== Cast ==
- Harry Carey as Harry "Cheyenne Harry" Henderson
- Joe Harris as Michael "Black Michael"
- Neva Gerber as Kate McDougal
- Mark Fenton as Angus McDougal
- J. Farrell MacDonald as The Priest (credited as J. Farrel McDonald)
- Neola May as Indian Girl (credited as Princess Neola May)
- Chief John Big Tree
- Dark Cloud
- Edith Johnson
- Betty Schade

== See also ==
- Harry Carey filmography
- List of lost films
