= The Scrapper =

1917 film directed by John Ford

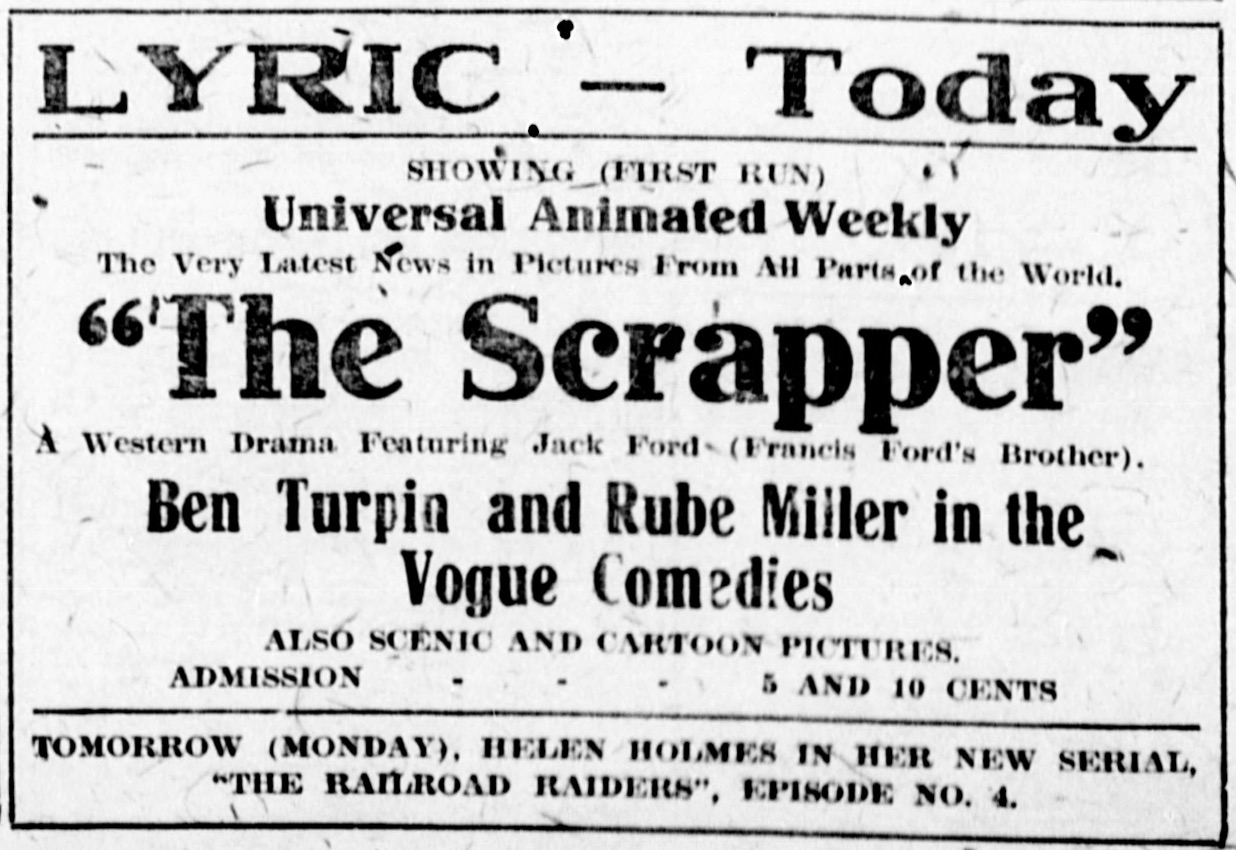
- Newspaper advertisement
- Directed by: John Ford
- Written by: John Ford
- Produced by: Carl Laemmle
- Starring: John Ford
- Cinematography: Ben F. Reynolds
- Distributed by: Universal Film Manufacturing Company
- Release date: June 9, 1917
- Running time: 2 reels (approximately 25 minutes)
- Country: United States
- Languages: Silent; English intertitles

The Scrapper is a 1917 American short Western drama directed by John Ford, who at that time was credited as "Jack Ford". The film is considered to be lost.

== Cast ==
- John Ford as Buck, The Scrapper (credited as Jack Ford)
- Louise Granville as Helen Dawson
- Duke Worne as Jerry Martin
- Jean Hathaway
- Martha Hayes
