= 1936 United States presidential election in Washington (state) =

- November 3, 1936

All 8 Washington votes to the Electoral College

Nominee	Franklin D. Roosevelt	Alf Landon
Party	Democratic	Republican
Home state	New York	Kansas
Running mate	John Nance Garner	Frank Knox
Electoral vote	8	0
Popular vote	459,579	206,892
Percentage	66.38%	29.88%
County results
Roosevelt
40–50%
50–60%
60–70%
70–80%
80–90%
President before election
Franklin D. Roosevelt
Democratic
Elected President
Franklin D. Roosevelt
Democratic

The 1936 United States presidential election in Washington took place on November 3, 1936, as part of the 1936 United States presidential election. Voters chose eight representatives, or electors, to the Electoral College, who voted for president and vice president.

Washington was won by incumbent President Franklin D. Roosevelt (D–New York), running with Vice President John Nance Garner, with 66.38% of the popular vote, against Governor Alf Landon (R–Kansas), running with Frank Knox, with 29.88% of the popular vote.

Roosevelt's 66.38 percent result is the best ever achieved by a Democratic presidential candidate in Washington state. As of the 2024 presidential election, this is the last election in which Adams County voted for a Democratic presidential candidate. This would also prove the last time Whitman County voted for a Democratic presidential candidate until Bill Clinton in 1992, as well as the last time a presidential candidate won every single county in the state. Roosevelt was the first Democrat to carry the state more than once, and the last until Bill Clinton in 1992 and 1996.

== Results ==
1936 United States presidential election in Washington
Party	Candidate	Votes	%
Democratic	Franklin D. Roosevelt (inc.)	459,579	66.38%
Republican	Alf Landon	206,892	29.88%
Union	William Lemke	17,463	2.52%
Socialist	Norman Thomas	3,496	0.50%
Communist	Earl Browder	1,907	0.28%
Christian	William Pelley	1,598	0.23%
Prohibition	D. Leigh Colvin	1,041	0.15%
Socialist Labor	John Aiken	362	0.05%
Total votes		692,338	100%

=== Results by county ===
County	Franklin D. Roosevelt Democratic		Alf Landon Republican		William F. Lemke Union		Other candidates Various parties		Margin		Total votes cast
County	#	%	#	%	#	%	#	%	#	%	Total votes cast
Adams	1,944	73.06%	657	24.69%	54	2.03%	6	0.23%	1,287	48.37%	2,661
Asotin	2,261	65.67%	916	26.60%	235	6.83%	31	0.90%	1,345	39.06%	3,443
Benton	2,402	53.06%	1,610	35.56%	497	10.98%	18	0.40%	792	17.50%	4,527
Chelan	8,030	59.54%	4,975	36.89%	401	2.97%	80	0.59%	3,055	22.65%	13,486
Clallam	5,586	66.36%	2,404	28.56%	360	4.28%	68	0.81%	3,182	37.80%	8,418
Clark	12,714	68.52%	4,868	26.24%	795	4.28%	177	0.95%	7,846	42.29%	18,554
Columbia	1,391	57.67%	807	33.46%	193	8.00%	21	0.87%	584	24.21%	2,412
Cowlitz	10,147	71.00%	3,617	25.31%	463	3.24%	65	0.45%	6,530	45.69%	14,292
Douglas	2,290	66.47%	1,025	29.75%	101	2.93%	29	0.84%	1,265	36.72%	3,445
Ferry	1,130	74.54%	320	21.11%	59	3.89%	7	0.46%	810	53.43%	1,516
Franklin	1,784	68.77%	622	23.98%	158	6.09%	30	1.16%	1,162	44.80%	2,594
Garfield	983	58.55%	652	38.83%	28	1.67%	16	0.95%	331	19.71%	1,679
Grant	4,560	85.59%	694	13.03%	57	1.07%	17	0.32%	3,866	72.56%	5,328
Grays Harbor	15,851	73.31%	5,053	23.37%	576	2.66%	142	0.66%	10,798	49.94%	21,622
Island	1,687	59.97%	921	32.74%	129	4.59%	76	2.70%	766	27.23%	2,813
Jefferson	2,279	66.54%	1,063	31.04%	59	1.72%	24	0.70%	1,216	35.50%	3,425
King	138,597	65.98%	66,544	31.68%	1,857	0.88%	3,047	1.45%	72,053	34.30%	210,045
Kitsap	12,414	75.94%	3,440	21.04%	242	1.48%	251	1.54%	8,974	54.90%	16,347
Kittitas	5,044	69.88%	1,941	26.89%	195	2.70%	38	0.53%	3,103	42.99%	7,218
Klickitat	2,545	65.29%	1,190	30.53%	136	3.49%	27	0.69%	1,355	34.76%	3,898
Lewis	9,619	57.58%	5,885	35.23%	932	5.58%	269	1.61%	3,734	22.35%	16,705
Lincoln	3,627	71.55%	1,325	26.14%	107	2.11%	10	0.20%	2,302	45.41%	5,069
Mason	3,087	70.19%	1,015	23.08%	250	5.68%	46	1.05%	2,072	47.11%	4,398
Okanogan	5,622	64.87%	2,367	27.31%	639	7.37%	39	0.45%	3,255	37.56%	8,667
Pacific	4,395	68.17%	1,732	26.87%	264	4.09%	56	0.87%	2,663	41.31%	6,447
Pend Oreille	1,903	66.19%	813	28.28%	133	4.63%	26	0.90%	1,090	37.91%	2,875
Pierce	48,988	70.09%	18,331	26.23%	1,433	2.05%	1,139	1.63%	30,657	43.86%	69,891
San Juan	775	48.59%	690	43.26%	117	7.34%	13	0.82%	85	5.33%	1,595
Skagit	9,639	61.73%	5,222	33.44%	538	3.45%	216	1.38%	4,417	28.29%	15,615
Skamania	1,863	80.65%	406	17.58%	26	1.13%	15	0.65%	1,457	63.07%	2,310
Snohomish	25,081	70.51%	8,882	24.97%	1,041	2.93%	565	1.59%	16,199	45.54%	35,569
Spokane	48,117	68.62%	19,951	28.45%	1,310	1.87%	747	1.07%	28,166	40.17%	70,125
Stevens	4,536	65.41%	1,981	28.57%	352	5.08%	66	0.95%	2,555	36.84%	6,935
Thurston	10,647	67.49%	4,425	28.05%	539	3.42%	164	1.04%	6,222	39.44%	15,775
Wahkiakum	1,098	69.36%	419	26.47%	52	3.28%	14	0.88%	679	42.89%	1,583
Walla Walla	6,562	56.23%	4,584	39.28%	487	4.17%	37	0.32%	1,978	16.95%	11,670
Whatcom	15,428	59.90%	9,035	35.08%	796	3.09%	497	1.93%	6,393	24.82%	25,756
Whitman	7,753	64.75%	3,955	33.03%	182	1.52%	83	0.69%	3,798	31.72%	11,973
Yakima	17,200	54.33%	12,555	39.66%	1,670	5.28%	232	0.73%	4,645	14.67%	31,657
Totals	459,579	66.38%	206,892	29.88%	17,463	2.52%	8,404	1.21%	252,687	36.50%	692,338

== See also ==
- United States presidential elections in Washington (state)
