= 1936 United States presidential election =

First re-election of Franklin D. Roosevelt

- November 3, 1936

531 members of the Electoral College 266 electoral votes needed to win
- Turnout: 61.0% (▲4.2 pp)

Nominee	Franklin D. Roosevelt	Alf Landon
Party	Democratic	Republican
Home state	New York	Kansas
Running mate	John Nance Garner	Frank Knox
Electoral vote	523	8
States carried	46	2
Popular vote	27,747,636	16,679,543
Percentage	60.8%	36.5%
- Presidential election results map. Blue denotes states won by Roosevelt/Garner, red denotes those won by Landon/Knox. Numbers indicate the number of electoral votes allotted to each state.
President before election
Franklin D. Roosevelt
Democratic
Elected President
Franklin D. Roosevelt
Democratic

A presidential election was held in the United States on November 3, 1936. In the midst of the Great Depression, the Democratic ticket of incumbent President Franklin D. Roosevelt and incumbent Vice President John Nance Garner defeated the Republican ticket of Kansas governor Alf Landon and newspaper editor Frank Knox in a landslide victory. Roosevelt won the highest share of the popular vote (60.8%) and the electoral vote (98.49%) since the largely uncontested 1820 election. The sweeping victory consolidated the New Deal Coalition in control of the Fifth Party System.

President Roosevelt and Vice President Garner were renominated without opposition. With the backing of party leaders, Landon defeated progressive and isolationist Senator William Borah of Idaho at the 1936 Republican National Convention to win his party's presidential nomination. The populist Union Party nominated Republican Congressman William Lemke of North Dakota for president.

The election took place as the Great Depression entered its eighth year. Roosevelt was still working to push his New Deal policies through Congress and the courts. However, the policies he had already enacted, such as Social Security and unemployment benefits, had proven to be highly popular with most Americans. Landon, a political moderate, accepted much of the New Deal but criticized it for waste and inefficiency.

Roosevelt went on to win the greatest electoral landslide since the rise of hegemonic control between the Democratic and Republican parties in the 1850s. Roosevelt took 60.8% of the popular vote, while Landon won 36.56% and Lemke won 1.96%. Roosevelt carried every state except for Maine and Vermont, which together cast only eight votes. He carried 523 of 531 total electoral votes, constituting 98.49% of the total—the largest share of the Electoral College for a candidate since 1820, the second-largest number of raw electoral votes, and the largest ever for a Democrat. Roosevelt also won by the widest margin in the popular vote for a Democrat in history, although Lyndon B. Johnson would later win a slightly higher share of the popular vote (61.1%) in 1964. Roosevelt's 523 electoral votes marked the first of only three times in American history when a presidential candidate received over 500 electoral votes in a presidential election (the others being by Republicans Richard Nixon in 1972 and Ronald Reagan in 1984).

== Nominations ==
=== Democratic Party nomination ===
Democratic Party (United States) 1936 Democratic Party ticket
Franklin D. Roosevelt	John Nance Garner
for President	for Vice President
32nd President of the United States (1933–1945)	32nd Vice President of the United States (1933–1941)

Franklin D. Roosevelt	Henry Skillman Breckinridge	Upton Sinclair	John S. McGroarty	Al Smith
U.S. President from New York (1933–1945)	Assistant Secretary of War (1913–1916)	Novelist and Journalist from California	Congressman from California (1935–1939)	Governor of New York from New York (1919-1920, 1923–1928)
4,830,730 votes	136,407 votes	106,068 votes	61,391 votes	8,856 votes

Before his assassination, there was a challenge from Louisiana Senator Huey Long. But due to Long's untimely death, President Roosevelt faced only one primary opponent other than various favorite sons. Henry Skillman Breckinridge, an anti-New Deal lawyer from New York, filed to run against Roosevelt in four primaries. Breckinridge's challenge of the popularity of the New Deal among Democrats failed miserably. In New Jersey, President Roosevelt did not file for the preference vote and lost that primary to Breckinridge, even though he did receive 19% of the vote on write-ins. Roosevelt's candidates for delegates swept the race in New Jersey and elsewhere. In other primaries, Breckinridge's best showing was 15% in Maryland. Overall, Roosevelt received 93% of the primary vote, compared to 2.5% for Breckinridge.

The Democratic National Convention was held in Philadelphia between July 23 and 27. The delegates unanimously re-nominated incumbents President Roosevelt and Vice President John Nance Garner. At Roosevelt's request, the two-thirds rule, which had given the South a de facto veto power, was repealed.

The balloting
Presidential ballot		Vice-presidential ballot	
Franklin D. Roosevelt	1100	John Nance Garner	1100

=== Republican Party nomination ===
Republican Party (United States) 1936 Republican Party ticket
Alf Landon	Frank Knox
for President	for Vice President
26th Governor of Kansas (1933–1937)	Publisher of the Chicago Daily News (1931–1940)

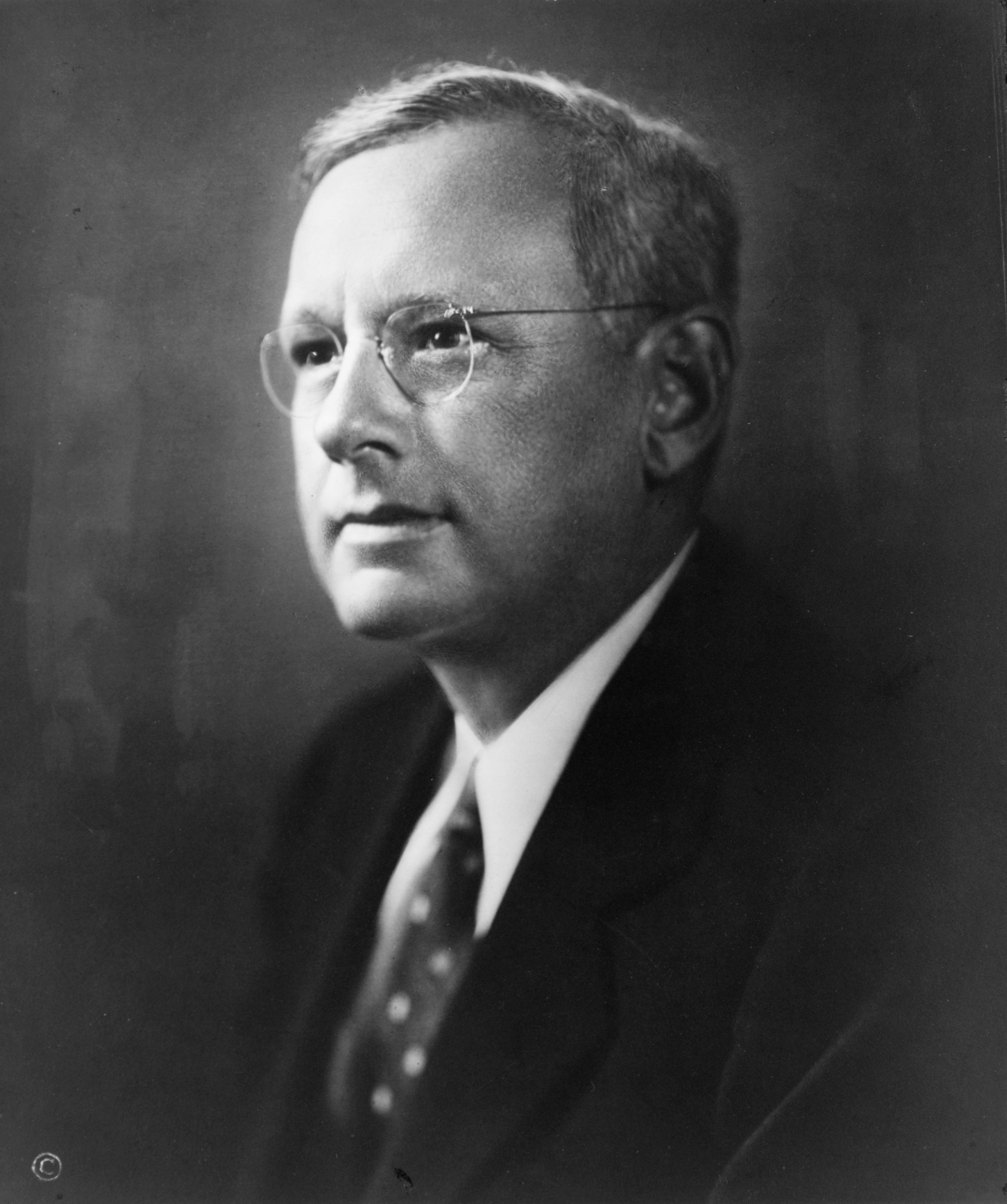
Governor Alf Landon of Kansas

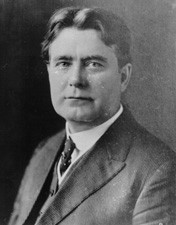
Senator William Borah from Idaho

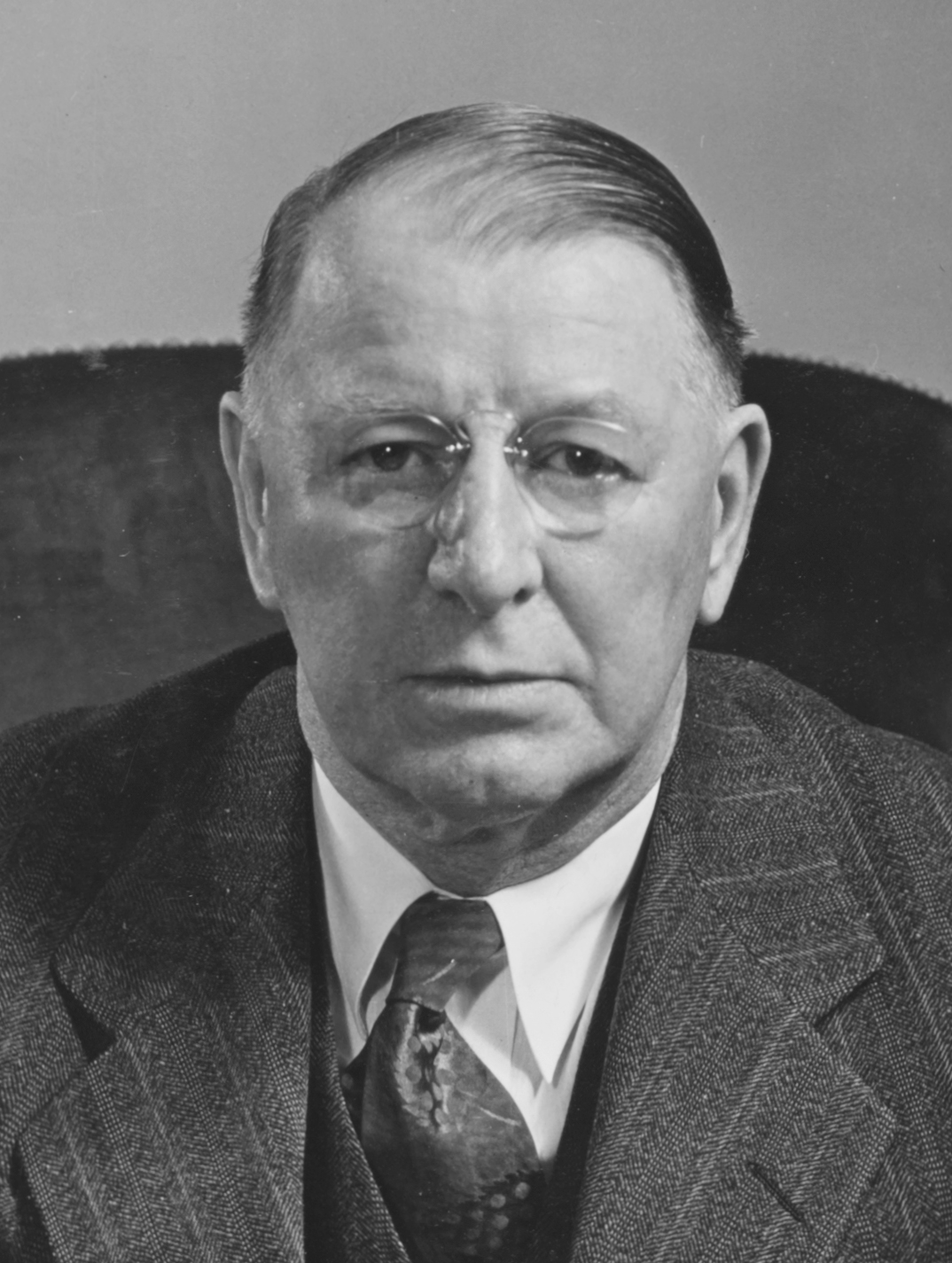
Publisher Frank Knox from Illinois
(withdrew; endorsed Landon)

Former President Herbert Hoover from California
(did not actively run)

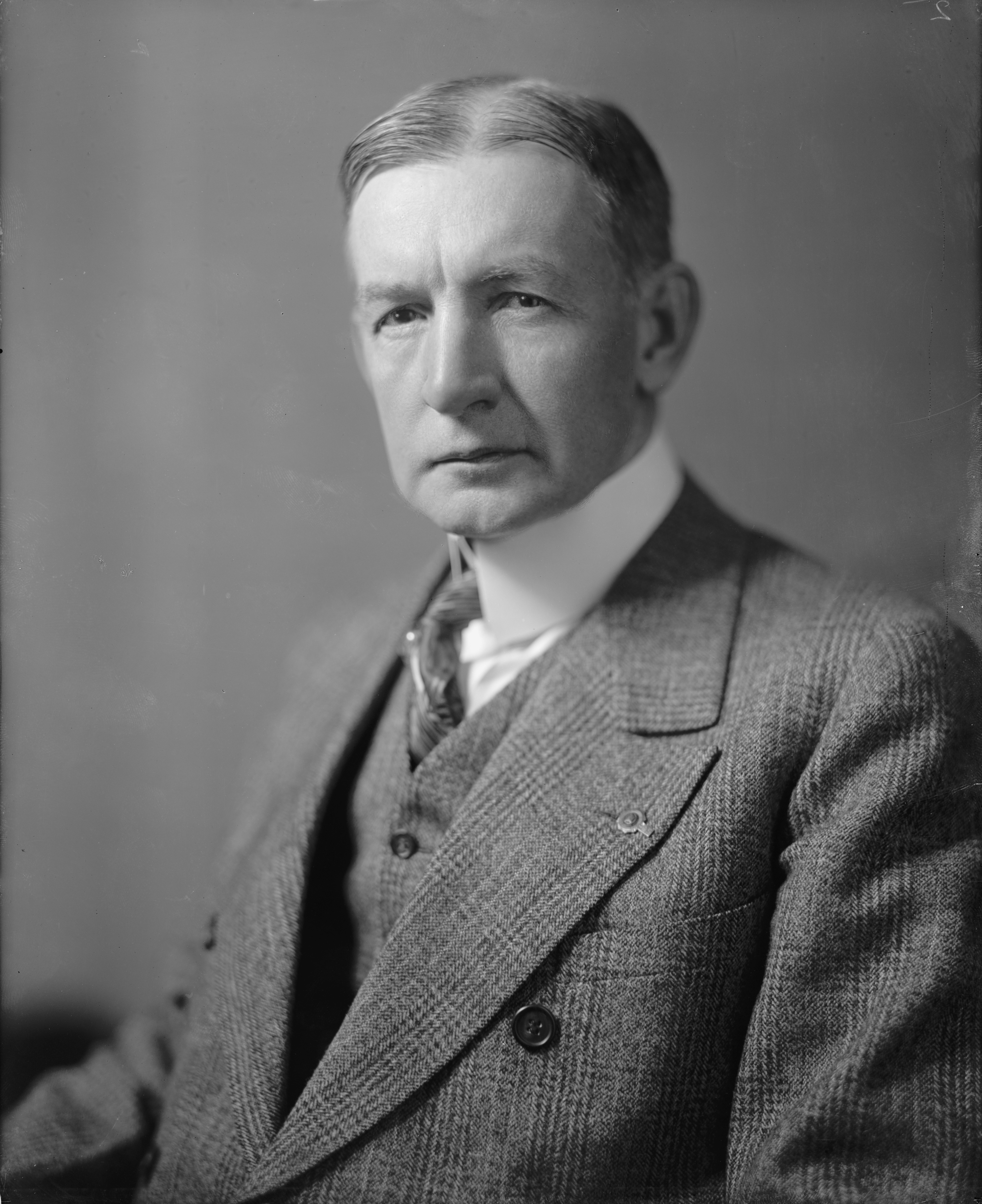
Former vice president Charles G. Dawes from Illinois
(declined to run)

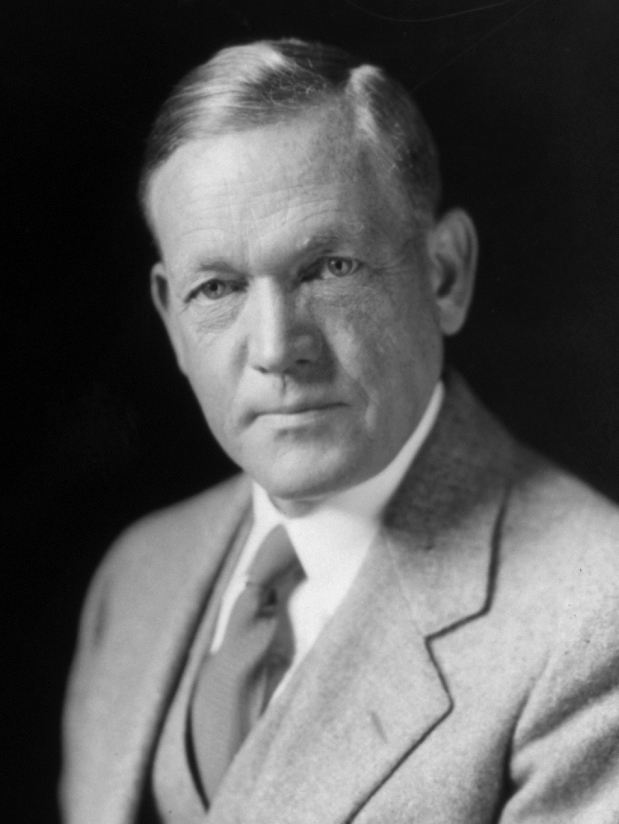
Senator Charles L. McNary from Oregon
(declined to run)

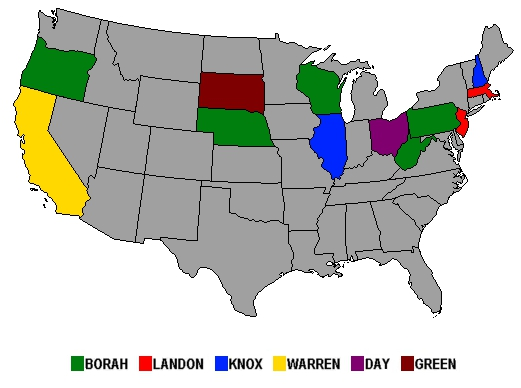
Republican primaries by state results

Following the landslide defeat of former president Herbert Hoover at the previous presidential election in 1932, combined with devastating congressional losses that year, the Republican Party was largely seen as rudderless. In truth, Hoover maintained control of the party machinery and was hopeful of making a comeback, but any such hopes were dashed as soon as the 1934 mid-term elections, which saw further losses by the Republicans and made clear the popularity of the New Deal among the public. The expected third-party candidacy of prominent Senator Huey Long briefly reignited Hoover's hopes, but they were just as quickly ended by Long's assassination in September 1935. While Hoover thereafter refused to actively disclaim any potential draft efforts, he privately accepted that he was unlikely to be nominated, and even less likely to defeat Roosevelt in any rematch. Draft efforts did focus on former vice-president Charles G. Dawes and Senate Minority Leader Charles L. McNary, two of the few prominent Republicans not to have been associated with Hoover's administration, but both men quickly disclaimed any interest in running.

The 1936 Republican National Convention was held in Cleveland, Ohio, between June 9 and 12. Although many candidates sought the Republican nomination, only two, Governor Landon and Senator William Borah from Idaho, were considered to be serious candidates. While County Attorney Earl Warren from California, Governor Warren Green of South Dakota, and Stephen A. Day from Ohio won their respective primaries, the seventy-year-old Borah, a well-known progressive and "insurgent," won the Wisconsin, Nebraska, Pennsylvania, West Virginia, and Oregon primaries, while also performing quite strongly in Knox's Illinois and Green's South Dakota. The party machinery, however, almost uniformly backed Landon, a wealthy businessman and centrist, who won primaries in Massachusetts and New Jersey and dominated in the caucuses and at state party conventions.

With Knox withdrawing to become Landon's selection for vice-president (after the rejection of New Hampshire Governor Styles Bridges) and Day, Green, and Warren releasing their delegates, the tally at the convention was as follows:

- Alf Landon 984
- William Borah 19

=== Other nominations ===
The Socialist Party again ran Norman Thomas who had been their candidate in 1928 and for Vice President George A. Nelson, a Wisconsin dairy farmer and writer on farming issues.

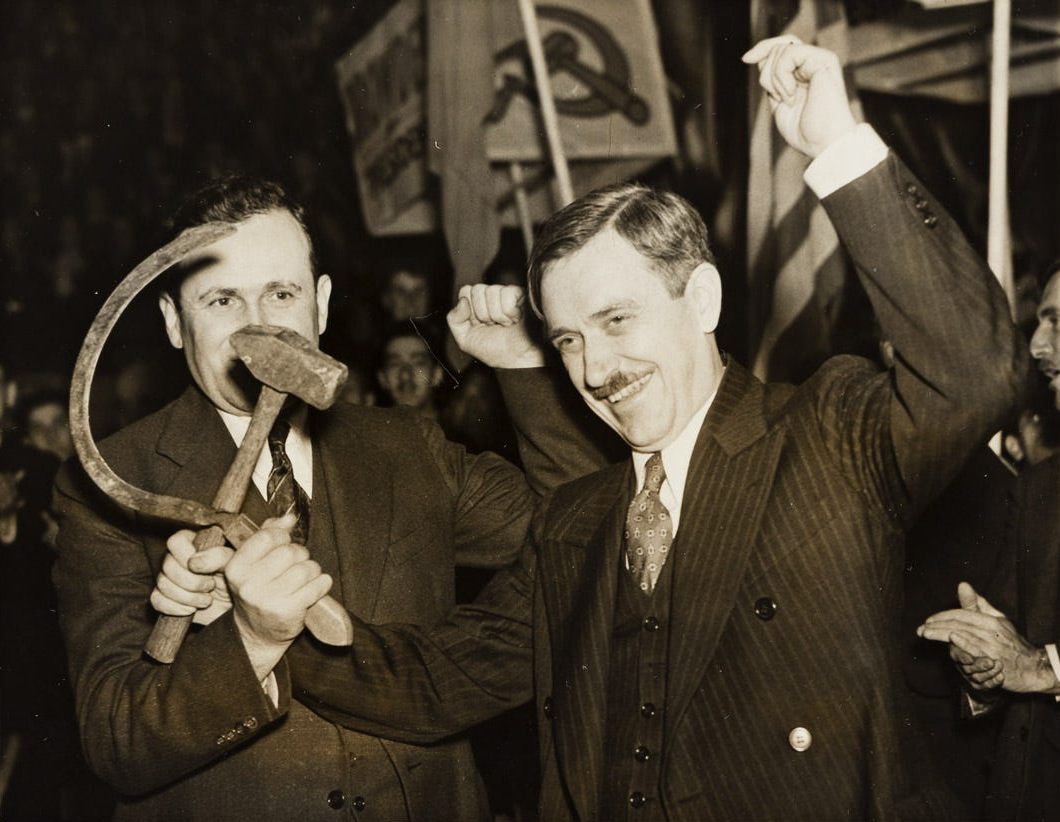
Earl Browder, right, Communist Party candidate for president, crosses a hammer with a sickle held by Charles Krumbein as they stand before a crowd gathered for the final rally of the campaign at Madison Square Garden, November 2, 1936

The Communist Party (CPUSA) nominated Earl Browder and for vice president their 1932 candidate James W. Ford, who had been the first African American nominee.

William Dudley Pelley, fascist activist and Chief of the pro-Nazi Silver Shirts of America, ran on the ballot for the Christian Party in Washington State with Willard W. Kemp Jr. as his Vice-President, but won fewer than two thousand votes. Pelley would later be convicted of sedition and sentenced to 15 years in prison.

==== Potential Huey Long candidacy ====
Many people, most significantly Democratic National Committee Chairman James Farley, expected Huey Long, the colorful Democratic senator from Louisiana, to run as a third-party candidate with his "Share Our Wealth" program as his platform. Polls made during 1934 and 1935 suggested Long could have won between six and seven million votes, or approximately fifteen percent of the actual number cast in the 1936 election.

Popular support for Long's Share Our Wealth program raised the possibility of a 1936 presidential bid against incumbent Franklin D. Roosevelt. When questioned by the press, Long gave conflicting answers on his plans for 1936. While promising to support a progressive Republican like Sen. William Borah, Long claimed that he would only support a Share Our Wealth candidate. At times, he even expressed the wish to retire: "I have less ambition to hold office than I ever had." However, in a later Senate speech, he admitted that he "might have a good parade to offer before I get through". Long's son Russell B. Long believed that his father would have run on a third party ticket in 1936. This is evidenced by Long's writing of a speculative book, My First Days in the White House, which laid out his plans for the presidency after the 1936 election. (Note: The book was published posthumously in 1935.)

Long biographers T. Harry Williams and William Ivy Hair speculated that Long planned to challenge Roosevelt for the Democratic nomination in 1936, knowing he would lose the nomination but gain valuable publicity in the process. Then he would break from the Democrats and form a third party using the Share Our Wealth plan as its basis. He hoped to have the public support of Father Charles Coughlin, a Catholic priest and populist radio personality from Royal Oak, Michigan; Iowa agrarian radical Milo Reno; and other dissidents such as Francis Townsend and the remnants of the End Poverty in California movement. Diplomat Edward M. House warned Roosevelt "many people believe that he can do to your administration what Theodore Roosevelt did to the Taft administration in '12."

In spring 1935, Long undertook a national speaking tour and regular radio appearances, attracting large crowds and increasing his stature. At a well attended Long rally in Philadelphia, a former mayor told the press "There are 250,000 Long votes" in this city. Regarding Roosevelt, Long boasted to the New York Times' Arthur Krock: "He's scared of me. I can out promise him, and he knows it." While addressing reporters in late summer of 1935, Long proclaimed:

"I'll tell you here and now that Franklin Roosevelt will not be the next President of the United States. If the Democrats nominate Roosevelt and the Republicans nominate Hoover, Huey Long will be your next President."

As the 1936 election approached, the Roosevelt administration grew increasingly concerned by Long's popularity. Democratic National Committee Chairman James Farley commissioned a secret poll in early 1935 "to find out if Huey's sales talks for his 'share the wealth' program were attracting many customers". Farley's poll revealed that if Long ran on a third-party ticket, he would win about 4 million votes (about 10% of the electorate). In a memo to Roosevelt, Farley wrote: "It was easy to conceive of a situation whereby Long by polling more than 3,000,000 votes, might have the balance of power in the 1936 election. For example, the poll indicated that he would command upwards of 100,000 votes in New York State, a pivotal state in any national election and a vote of that size could easily mean the difference between victory and defeat ... That number of votes would mostly come from our side and the result might spell disaster".

In response, Roosevelt in a letter to his friend William E. Dodd, the US ambassador to Germany, wrote: "Long plans to be a candidate of the Hitler type for the presidency in 1936. He thinks he will have a hundred votes at the Democratic convention. Then he will set up as an independent with Southern and mid-western Progressives ... Thus he hopes to defeat the Democratic Party and put in a reactionary Republican. That would bring the country to such a state by 1940 that Long thinks he would be made dictator. There are in fact some Southerners looking that way, and some Progressives drifting that way ... Thus it is an ominous situation".

However, Long was assassinated in September 1935. Some historians, including Long biographer T. Harry Williams, contend that Long had never, in fact, intended to run for the presidency in 1936. Instead, he had been plotting with Father Charles Coughlin, a Catholic priest and populist talk radio personality, to run someone else on the soon-to-be-formed "Share Our Wealth" Party ticket. According to Williams, the idea was that this candidate would split the left-wing vote with President Roosevelt, thereby electing a Republican president and proving the electoral appeal of Share Our Wealth. Long would then wait four years and run for president as a Democrat in 1940.

Prior to Long's death, leading contenders for the role of the sacrificial 1936 candidate included Borah, Montana Senator and running mate of Robert M. La Follette in 1924 Burton K. Wheeler, and Governor Floyd B. Olson of the Minnesota Farmer–Labor Party. After Long's assassination, however, the two senators lost interest, while Olson was diagnosed with terminal stomach cancer.

Father Coughlin, who had allied himself with Dr. Francis Townsend, a left-wing political activist who was pushing for the creation of an old-age pension system, and Rev. Gerald L. K. Smith, was eventually forced to run Representative William Lemke (R-North Dakota) as the candidate of the newly created "Union Party", with Thomas C. O'Brien, a lawyer and former District Attorney for Boston, as Lemke's running-mate. Lemke, who lacked the charisma and national stature of the other potential candidates, fared poorly in the election, barely managing two percent of the vote, and the party was dissolved the following year.

== Campaign ==
=== Pre-election polling ===
This election is notable for The Literary Digest poll, which was based on ten million questionnaires mailed to readers and potential readers; 2.38 million were returned. The Literary Digest had correctly predicted the winner of the last five elections, and announced in its October 31 issue that Landon would be the winner with 57.08% of the vote (v Roosevelt) and 370 electoral votes.

The cause of this mistake has often been attributed to improper sampling: more Republicans subscribed to the Literary Digest than Democrats, and were thus more likely to vote for Landon than Roosevelt. Indeed, every other poll made at this time predicted Roosevelt would win, although most expected him to garner no more than 370 electoral votes. However, a 1976 article in The American Statistician demonstrates that the actual reason for the error was that the Literary Digest relied on voluntary responses. As the article explains, the 2.38 million "respondents who returned their questionnaires represented only that subset of the population with a relatively intense interest in the subject at hand, and as such constitute in no sense a random sample ... it seems clear that the minority of anti-Roosevelt voters felt more strongly about the election than did the pro-Roosevelt majority." A more detailed study in 1988 showed that both the initial sample and non-response bias were contributing factors, and that the error due to the initial sample taken alone would not have been sufficient to predict the Landon victory.

The magnitude of the error by the Literary Digest (39.08% for the popular vote margin for Landon v Roosevelt) destroyed the magazine's credibility, and it folded within 18 months of the election, while George Gallup, an advertising executive who had begun a scientific poll, predicted that Roosevelt would win the election, based on a quota sample of 50,000 people.

His correct predictions made public opinion polling a critical element of elections for journalists, and indeed for politicians. The Gallup Poll would become a staple of future presidential elections, and remains one of the most prominent election polling organizations.

=== Campaign ===
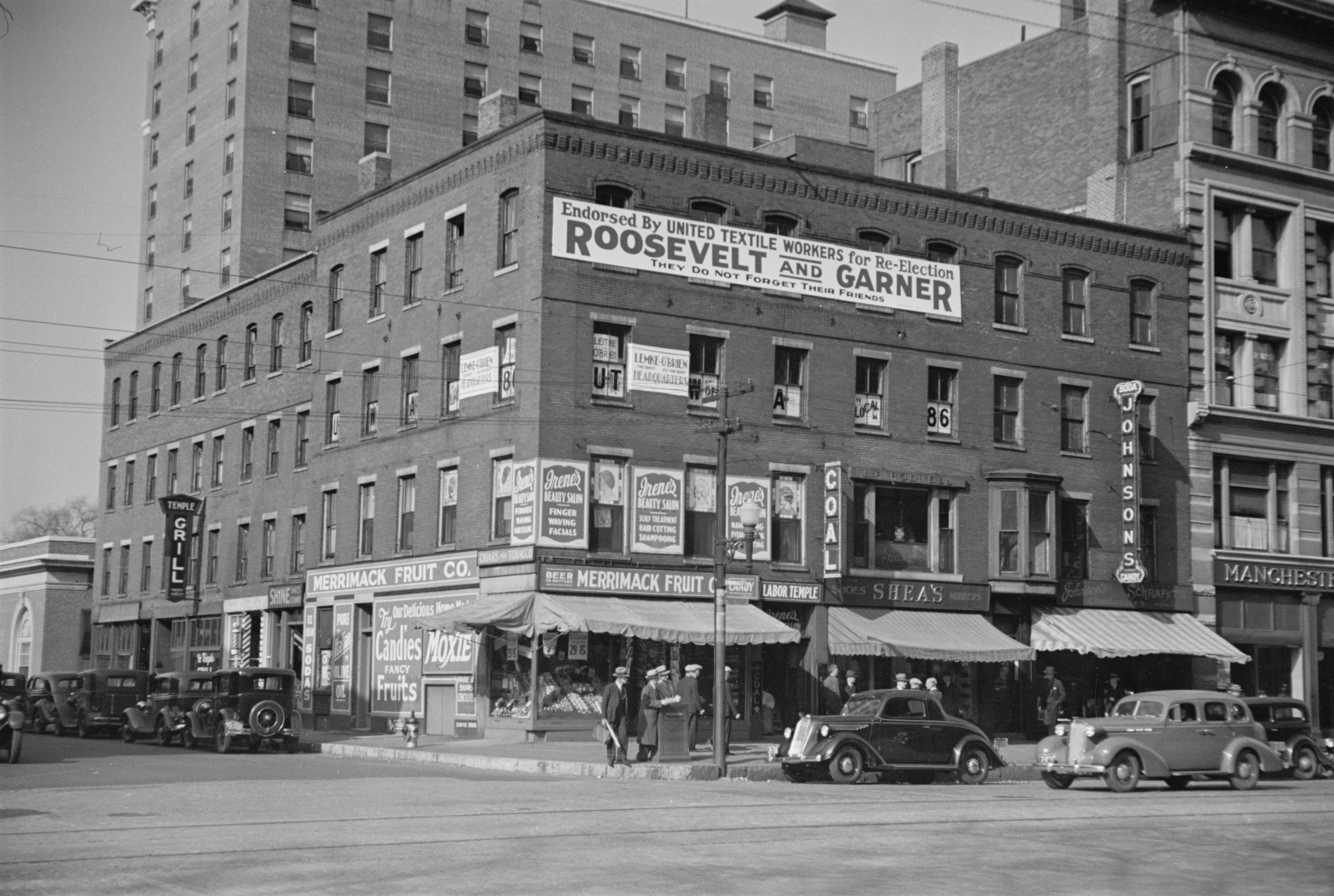
A 1936 election poster in Manchester, New Hampshire

Landon proved to be an ineffective campaigner who rarely travelled. Most of the attacks on FDR and Social Security were developed by Republican campaigners rather than Landon himself. In the two months after his nomination, he made no campaign appearances. Columnist Westbrook Pegler lampooned, "Considerable mystery surrounds the disappearance of Alfred M. Landon of Topeka, Kansas ... The Missing Persons Bureau has sent out an alarm bulletin bearing Mr. Landon's photograph and other particulars, and anyone having information of his whereabouts is asked to communicate direct with the Republican National Committee."

Landon respected and admired Roosevelt and accepted most of the New Deal but objected that it was hostile to business and involved too much waste and inefficiency. Late in the campaign, Landon accused Roosevelt of corruption – that is, of acquiring so much power that he was subverting the Constitution:

The President spoke truly when he boasted ... 'We have built up new instruments of public power.' He spoke truly when he said these instruments could provide 'shackles for the liberties of the people ... and ... enslavement for the public.' These powers were granted with the understanding that they were only temporary. But after the powers had been obtained, and after the emergency was clearly over, we were told that another emergency would be created if the power was given up. In other words, the concentration of power in the hands of the President was not a question of temporary emergency. It was a question of permanent national policy. In my opinion the emergency of 1933 was a mere excuse ... National economic planning—the term used by this Administration to describe its policy—violates the basic ideals of the American system ... The price of economic planning is the loss of economic freedom. And economic freedom and personal liberty go hand in hand.

Franklin Roosevelt's most notable speech in the 1936 campaign was an address he gave in Madison Square Garden in New York City on 31 October. Roosevelt offered a vigorous defense of the New Deal:

For twelve years this Nation was afflicted with hear-nothing, see-nothing, do-nothing Government. The Nation looked to Government but the Government looked away. Nine mocking years with the golden calf and three long years of the scourge! Nine crazy years at the ticker and three long years in the breadlines! Nine mad years of mirage and three long years of despair! Powerful influences strive today to restore that kind of government with its doctrine that that Government is best which is most indifferent.

For nearly four years you have had an Administration which instead of twirling its thumbs has rolled up its sleeves. We will keep our sleeves rolled up.

We had to struggle with the old enemies of peace—business and financial monopoly, speculation, reckless banking, class antagonism, sectionalism, war profiteering. They had begun to consider the Government of the United States as a mere appendage to their own affairs. We know now that Government by organized money is just as dangerous as Government by organized mob.

Never before in all our history have these forces been so united against one candidate as they stand today. They are unanimous in their hate for me—and I welcome their hatred.

== Results ==
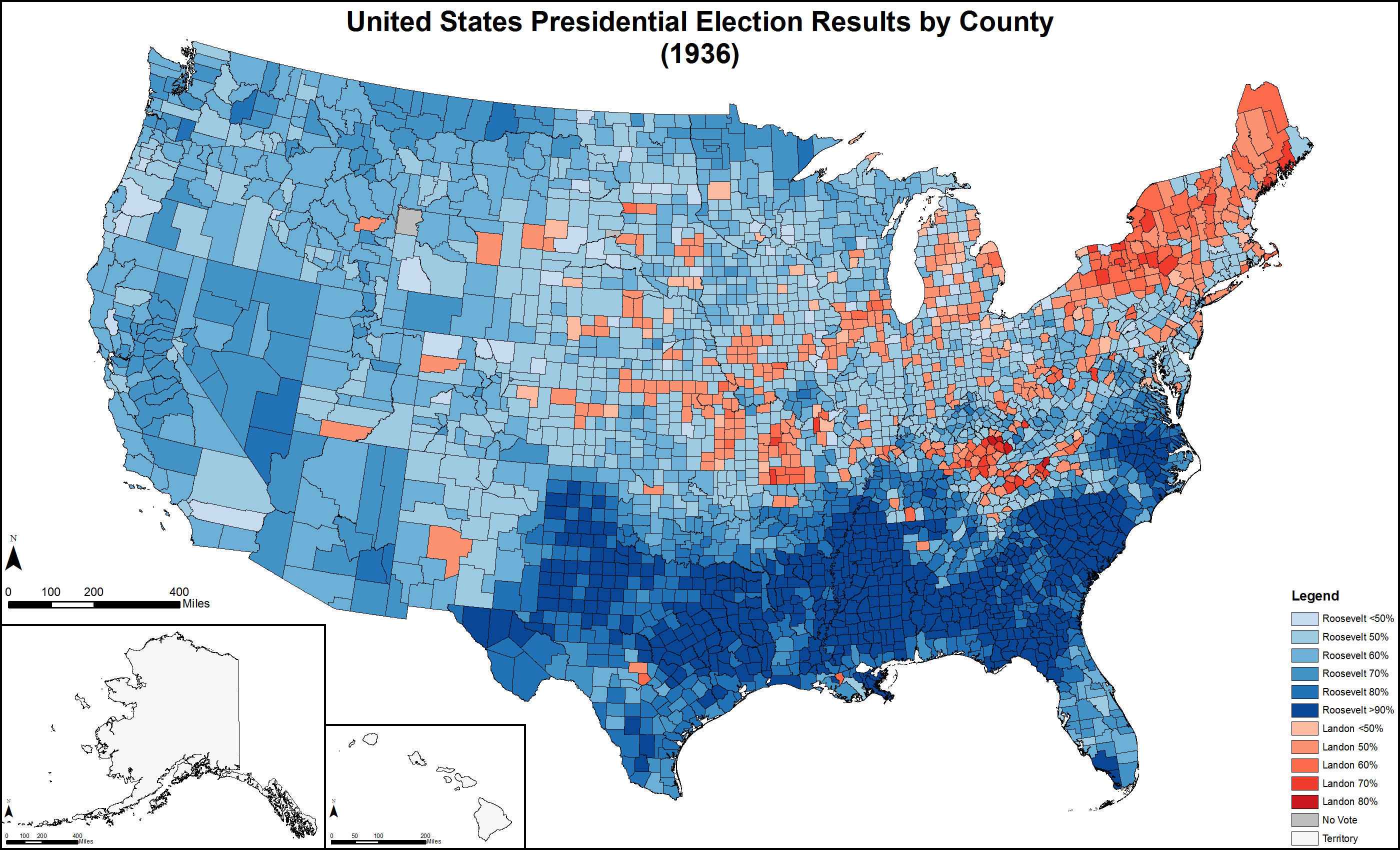
Election results by county. Franklin D. Roosevelt Alf Landon

Roosevelt won in a landslide, carrying 46 of the 48 states and bringing in many additional Democratic members of Congress. After Lyndon B. Johnson's 61.05% share of the popular vote in 1964, Roosevelt's 60.8% is the second-largest percentage in U.S. history (since 1824, when the vast majority of or all states have had a popular vote), and his 98.49% of the electoral vote is the highest in two-party competition.

The Republican Party saw its total in the United States House of Representatives reduced to 88 seats and in the United States Senate to 16 seats in their respective elections and only won four governorships in the 1936 elections. Roosevelt won the largest number of electoral votes ever recorded at that time, and has so far only been surpassed by Ronald Reagan in 1984, when seven more electoral votes were available to contest. Garner also won the highest percentage of the electoral vote of any vice president.

Landon won only eight electoral votes, tying William Howard Taft's total in his unsuccessful re-election campaign of 1912, which as of 2024, is the lowest electoral vote total for a major-party candidate.

Roosevelt's net vote totals in the twelve largest cities increased from 1,791,000 votes in the 1932 election to 3,479,000 votes which was the highest for any presidential candidate from 1920 to 1948. Philadelphia and Columbus, Ohio, which had voted for Hoover in the 1932 election, voted for Roosevelt in the 1936 election. Although the majority of black voters had been Republican in the 1932 election Roosevelt won two-thirds of black voters in the 1936 election.

Norman Thomas, who had received 884,885 votes in the 1932 election, saw his totals decrease to 187,910.

The eleven states of the former Confederacy provided 4.78% of Landon's votes, with him taking 19.09% of the vote in that region. This was the last Democratic landslide in the West, as Democrats won every state except Kansas (Landon's home state) by more than 10%. West of the Great Plains States, Roosevelt only lost eight counties. Since 1936, only Richard Nixon in 1972 (winning all but 19 counties) and Ronald Reagan in 1980 (winning all but twenty counties) have even approached such a disproportionate ratio.

Of the 3,095 counties, parishes and independent cities making returns, Roosevelt won in 2,634 (85 percent) while Landon carried 461 (15 percent); this was one of the few measures by which Landon's campaign was more successful than Hoover's had been four years prior, with Landon winning 87 more counties than Hoover did, albeit mostly in less populous parts of the country. Democrats also expanded their majorities in Congress, winning control of over three-quarters of the seats in each house.

The election saw the consolidation of the New Deal coalition; while the Democrats lost some of their traditional allies in big business, high-income voters, businessmen and professionals, they were replaced by groups such as organized labor and African Americans, the latter of whom voted Democratic for the first time since the Civil War, and made major gains among the poor and other minorities. Roosevelt won 86 percent of the Jewish vote, 81 percent of the Catholics, 80 percent of union members, 76 percent of Southerners, 76 percent of Blacks in northern cities, and 75 percent of people on relief. Roosevelt also carried 102 of the nation's 106 cities with a population of 100,000 or more.

Some political pundits predicted the Republicans, whom many voters blamed for the Great Depression, would soon become an extinct political party. However, the Republicans would make a strong comeback in the 1938 congressional elections, and while they would remain a potent force in Congress, they were not able to regain control of the House or the Senate until 1946, and would not regain the presidency until 1952.

The Electoral College results, in which Landon only won Maine and Vermont, inspired Democratic Party chairman James Farley—who had in fact declared during the campaign that Roosevelt would lose only these two states—to amend the then-conventional political wisdom of "As Maine goes, so goes the nation" into "As Maine goes, so goes Vermont." In fact, since then, the states of Vermont and Maine have voted for the same candidate in every election except the 1968 presidential election. Additionally, a prankster posted a sign on Vermont's border with New Hampshire the day after the 1936 election, reading, "You are now leaving the United States."

Democrats won Pennsylvania for the first time since 1856. This was the last election in which Indiana, Kansas, Nebraska, North Dakota, and South Dakota would vote Democratic until 1964. Of these states, only Indiana would vote Democratic again after 1964 (for Barack Obama in 2008), making this the penultimate time a Democrat won any of the Great Plains states.

Electoral results
Presidential candidate	Party	Home state	Popular vote		Electoral vote	Running mate		
Presidential candidate	Party	Home state	Count	Percentage	Electoral vote	Vice-presidential candidate	Home state	Electoral vote
Franklin D. Roosevelt (incumbent)	Democratic	New York	27,752,648	60.80%	523	John Nance Garner (incumbent)	Texas	523
Alf Landon	Republican	Kansas	16,681,862	36.54%	8	Frank Knox	Illinois	8
William Lemke	Union	North Dakota	892,378	1.95%	0	Thomas C. O'Brien	Massachusetts	0
Norman Thomas	Socialist	New York	187,910	0.41%	0	George A. Nelson	Wisconsin	0
Earl Browder	Communist	Kansas	79,315	0.17%	0	James W. Ford	New York	0
D. Leigh Colvin	Prohibition	New York	37,646	0.08%	0	Claude A. Watson	California	0
John W. Aiken	Socialist Labor	Connecticut	12,799	0.03%	0	Emil F. Teichert	New York	0
Other			3,141	0.00%	—	Other		—
Total			45,647,699	100%	531			531
Needed to win					266			266

Source (popular vote): Leip, David. "1936 Presidential Election Results". Dave Leip's Atlas of U.S. Presidential Elections.

Source (electoral vote): "Electoral College Box Scores 1789–1996". National Archives and Records Administration.

Popular vote
Roosevelt	60.80%
Landon	36.54%
Lemke	1.95%
Thomas	0.41%
Others	0.30%

Electoral vote
Roosevelt	98.49%
Landon	1.51%

=== Geography of results ===
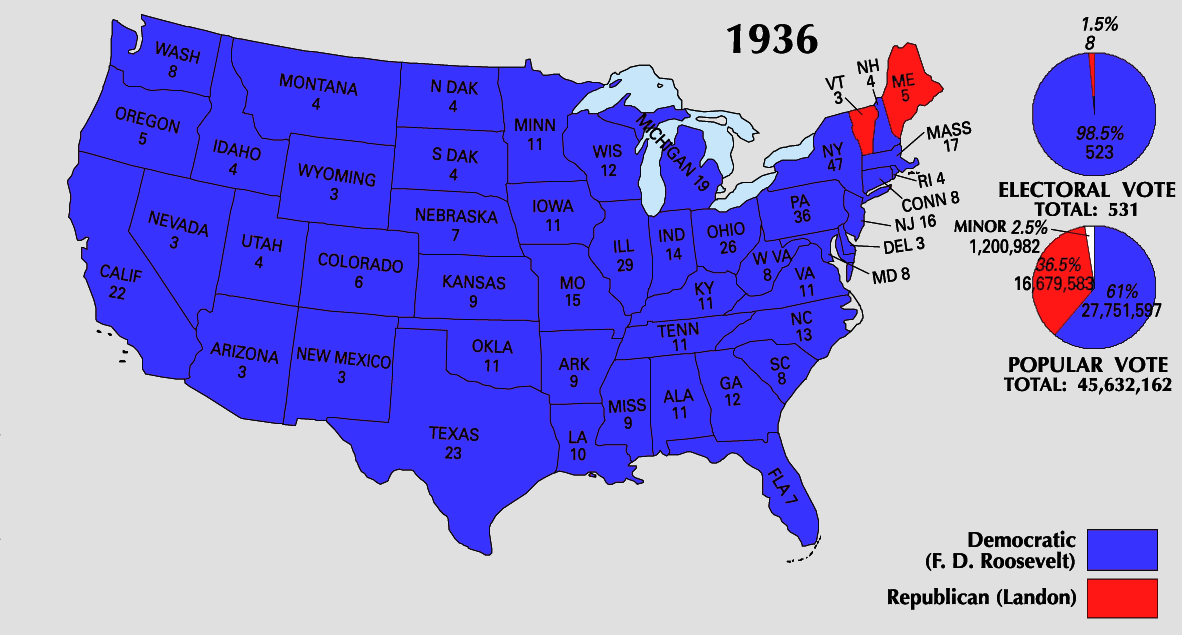

Results by county, shaded according to winning candidate's percentage of the vote

==== Cartographic gallery ====
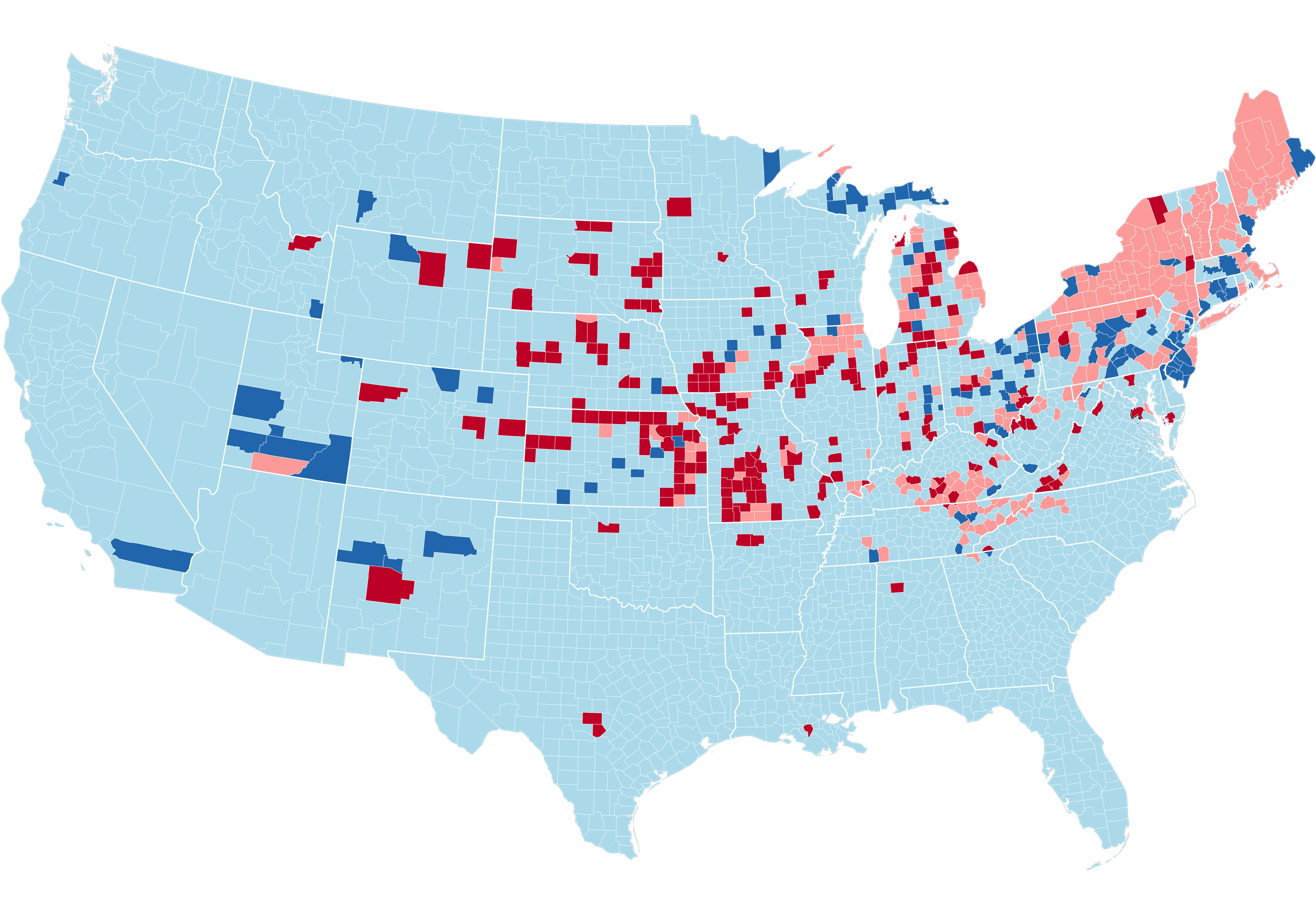
1932-36 County flips map, dark red indicates a Republican flip, dark blue indicates a Democratic flip, while light blue and light red indicate holds.

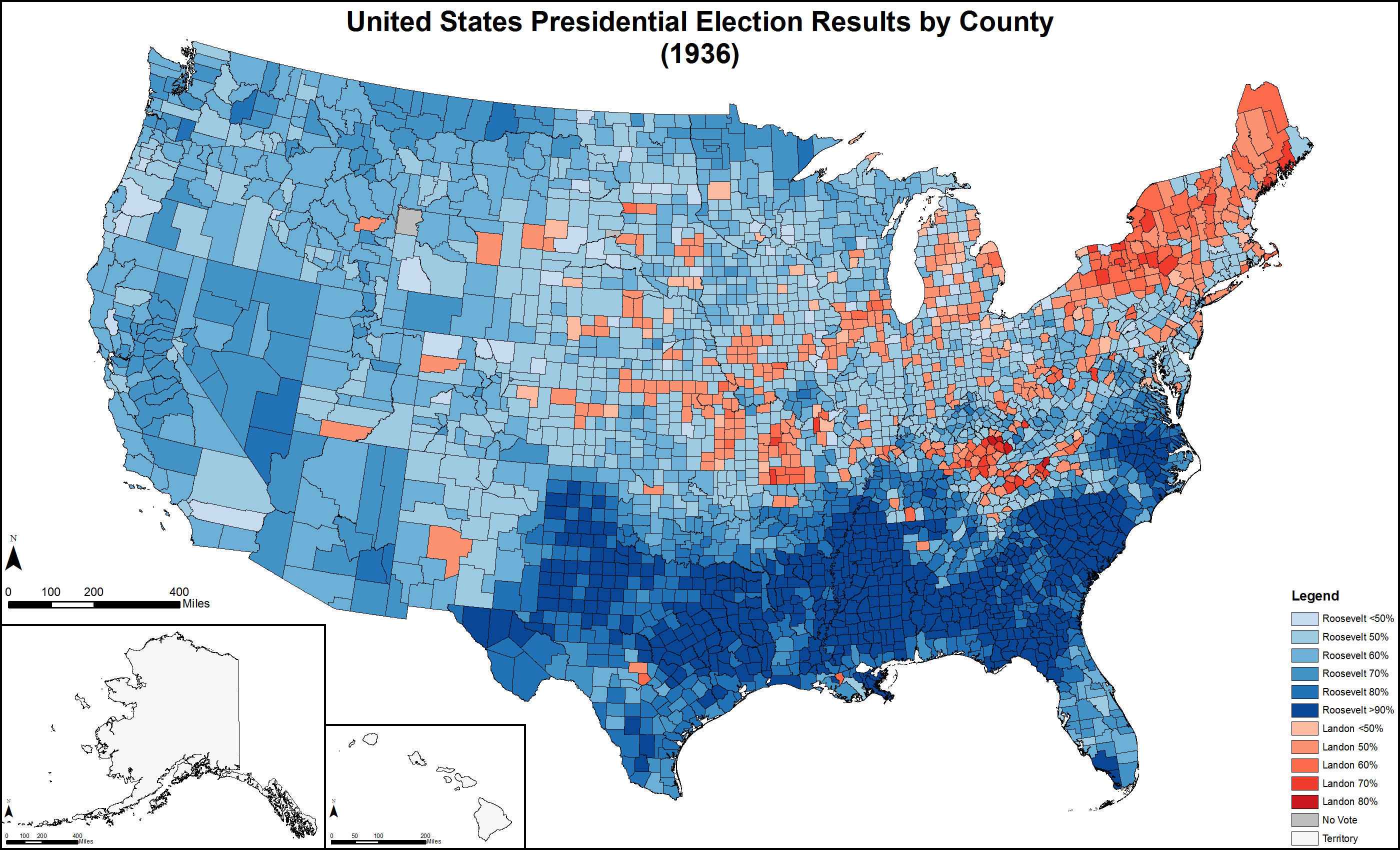
Presidential election results by county

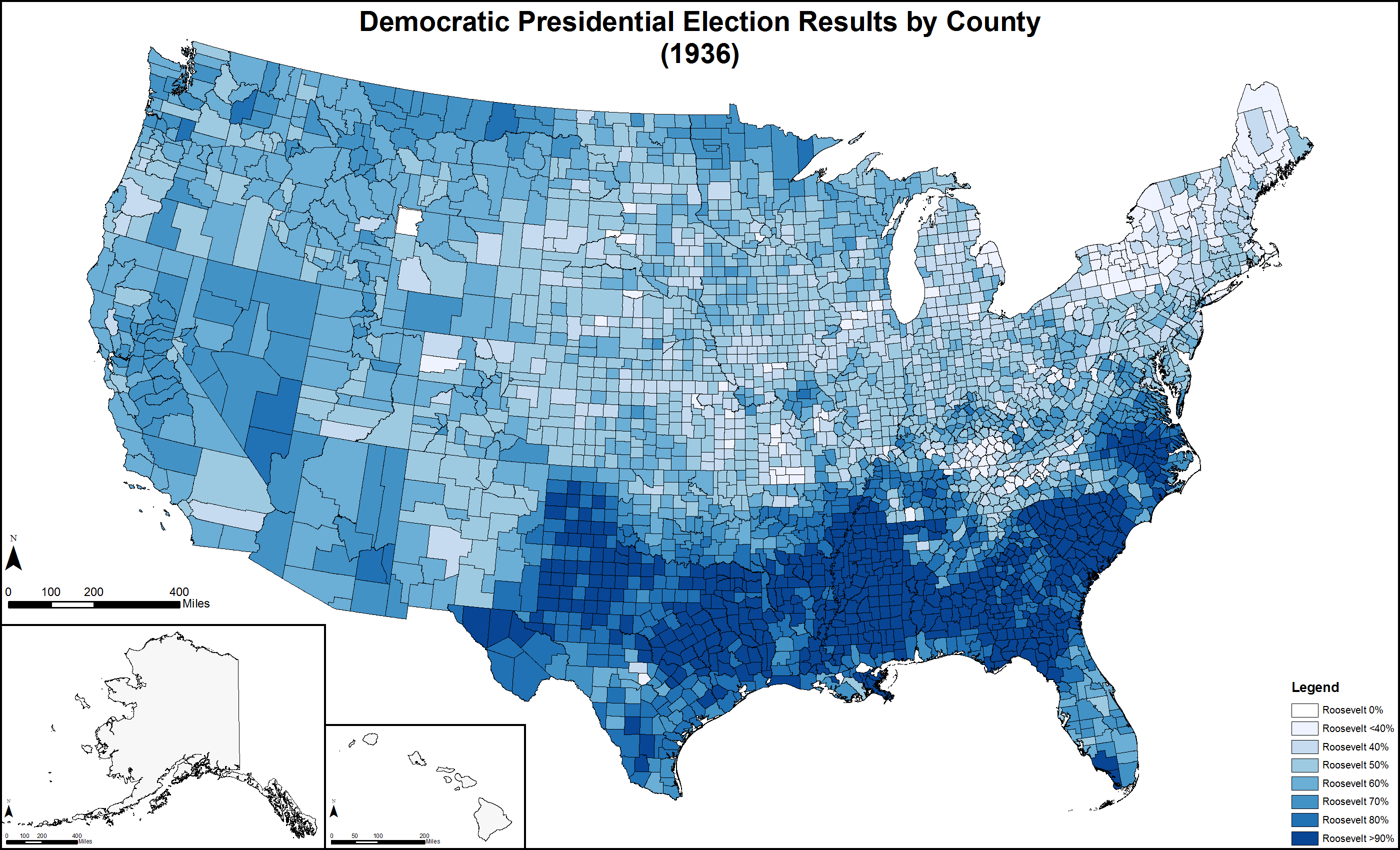
Democratic presidential election results by county

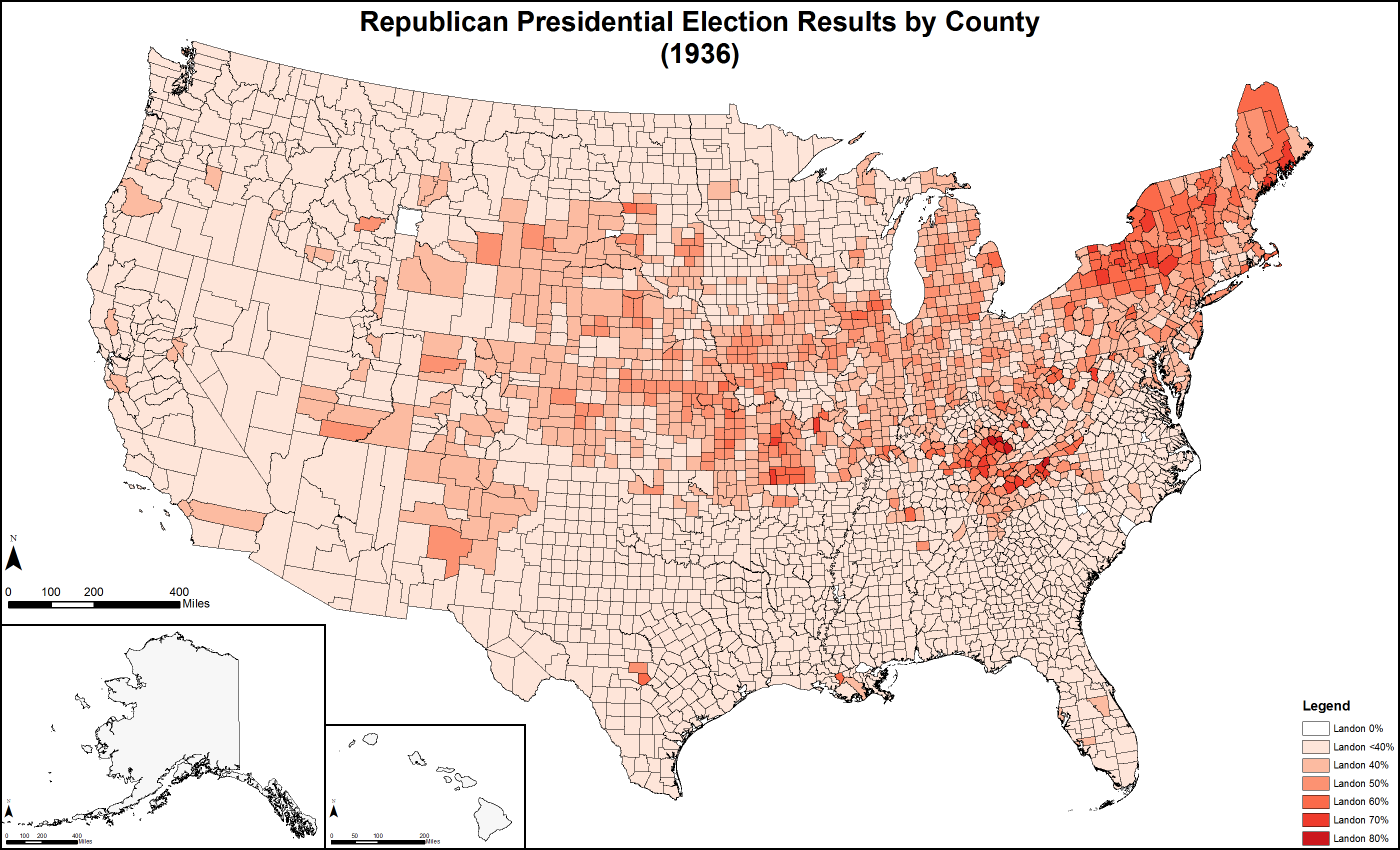
Republican presidential election results by county

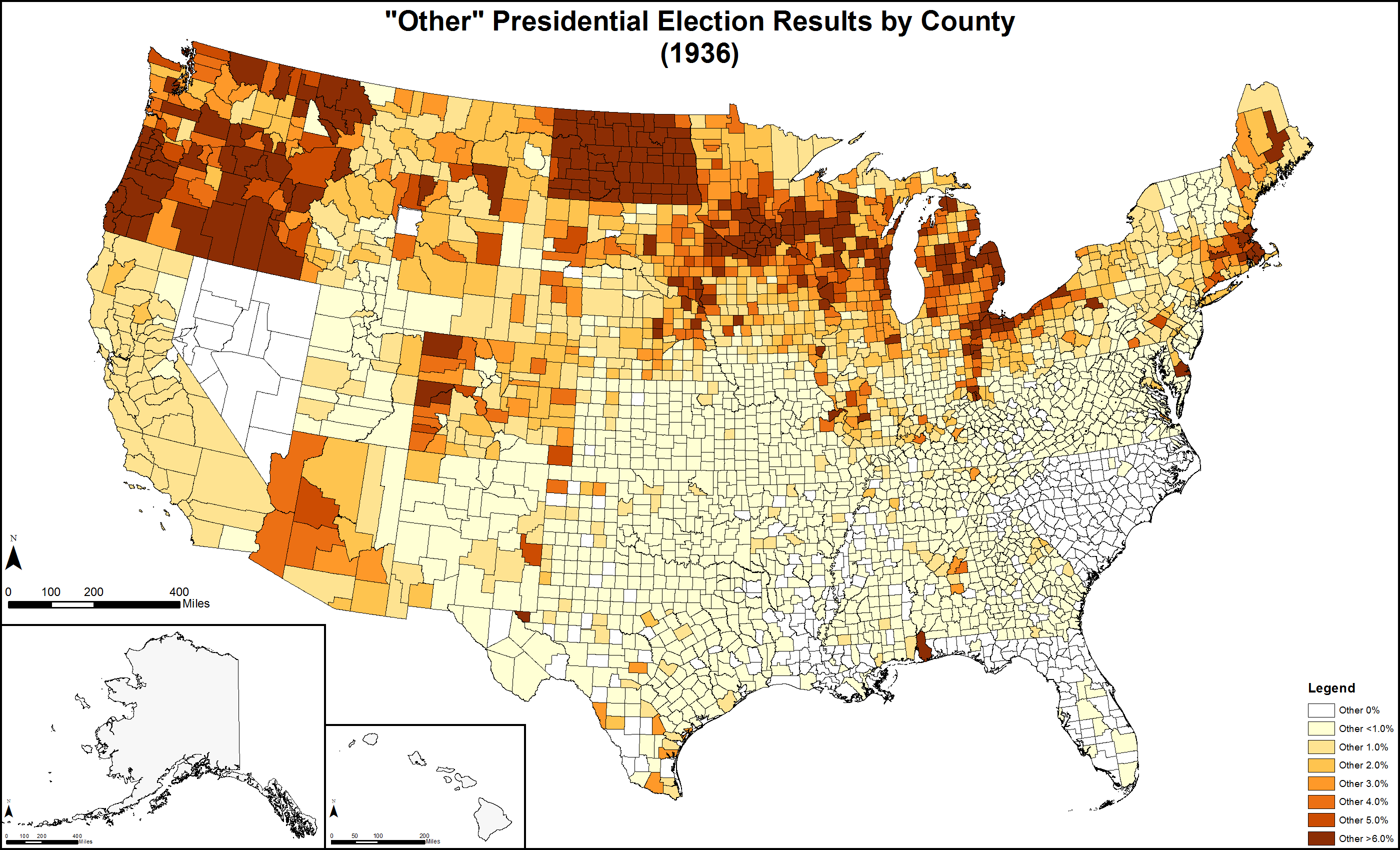
"Other" presidential election results by county

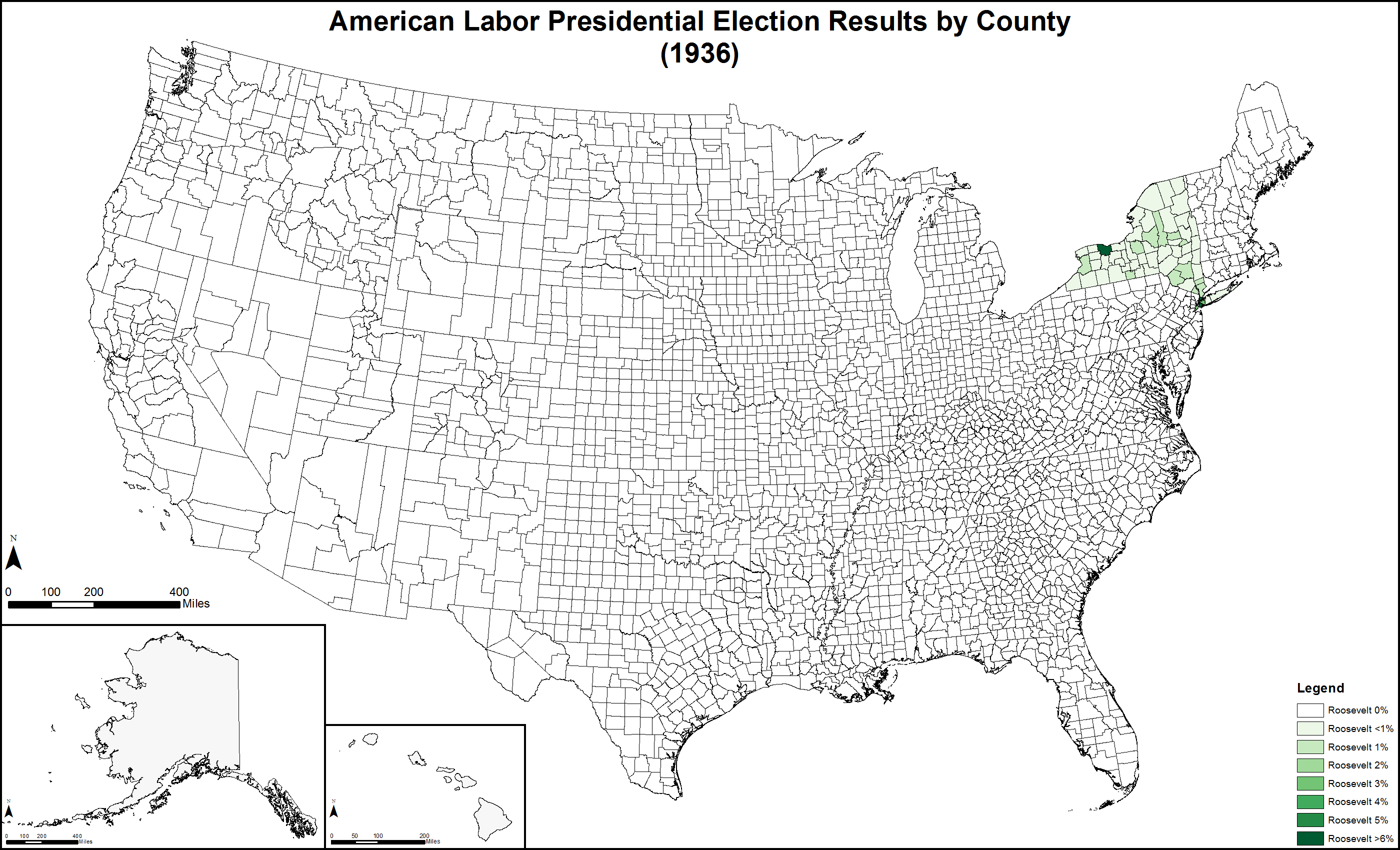
American Labor presidential election results by county

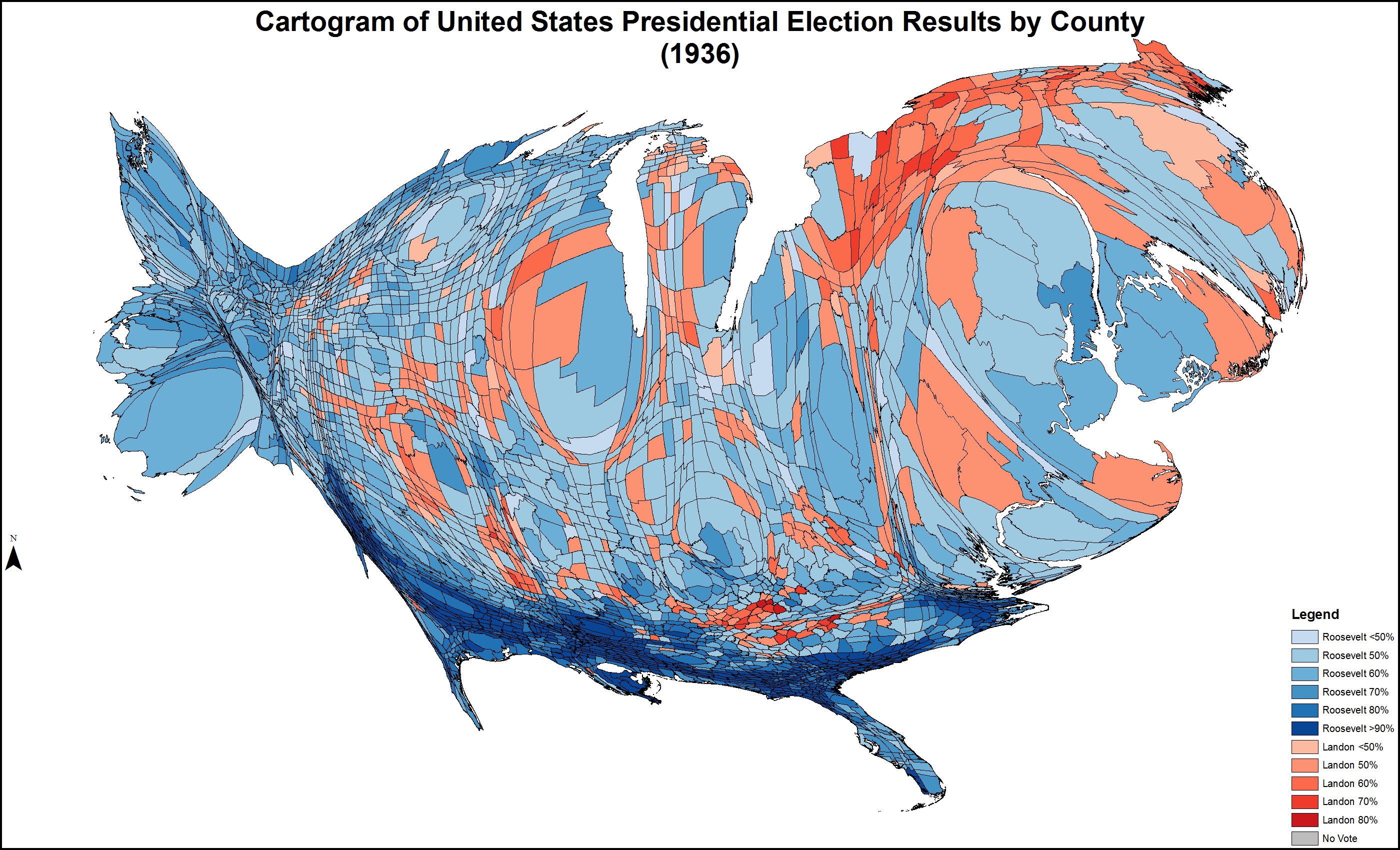
Cartogram of presidential election results by county

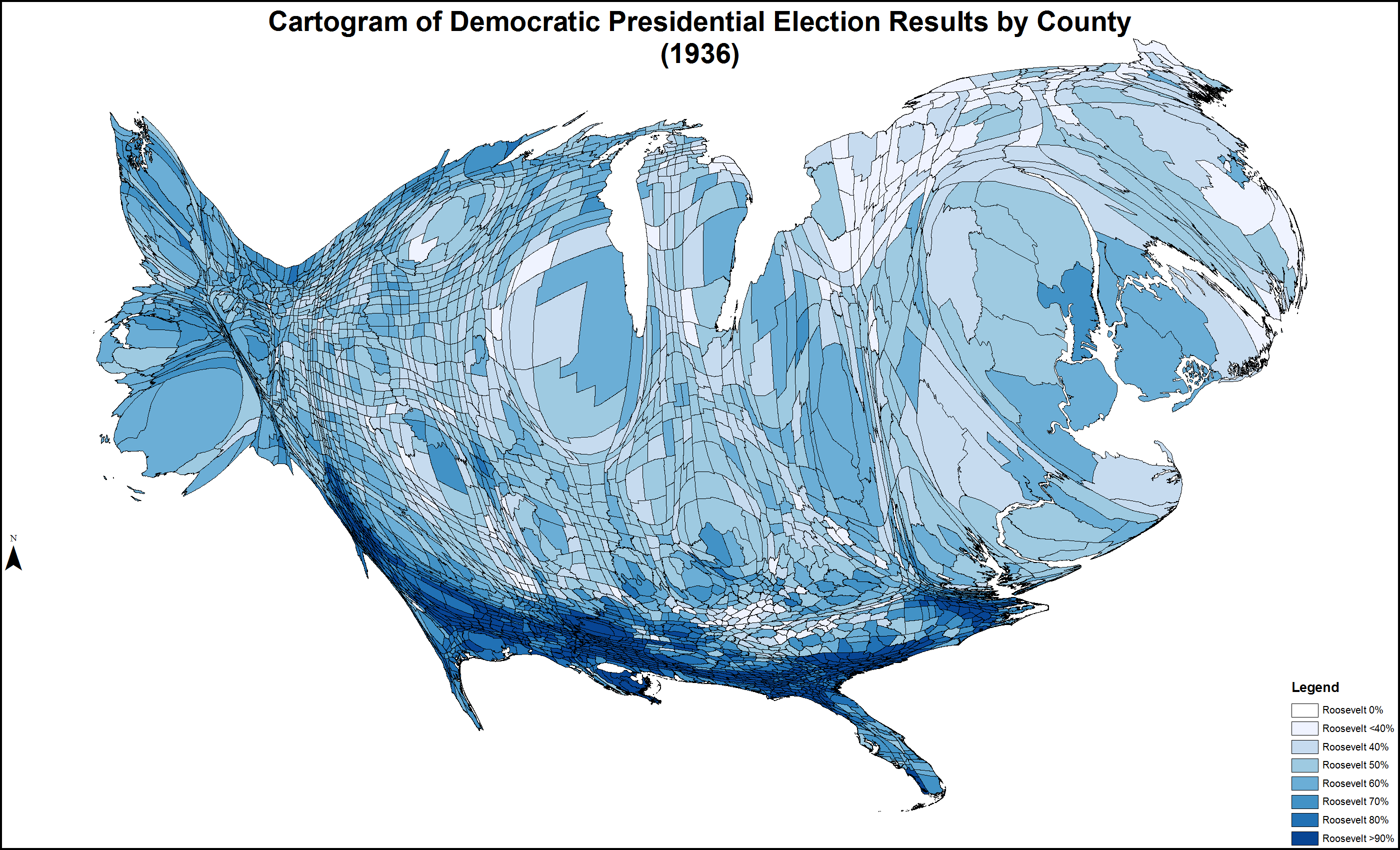
Cartogram of Democratic presidential election results by county

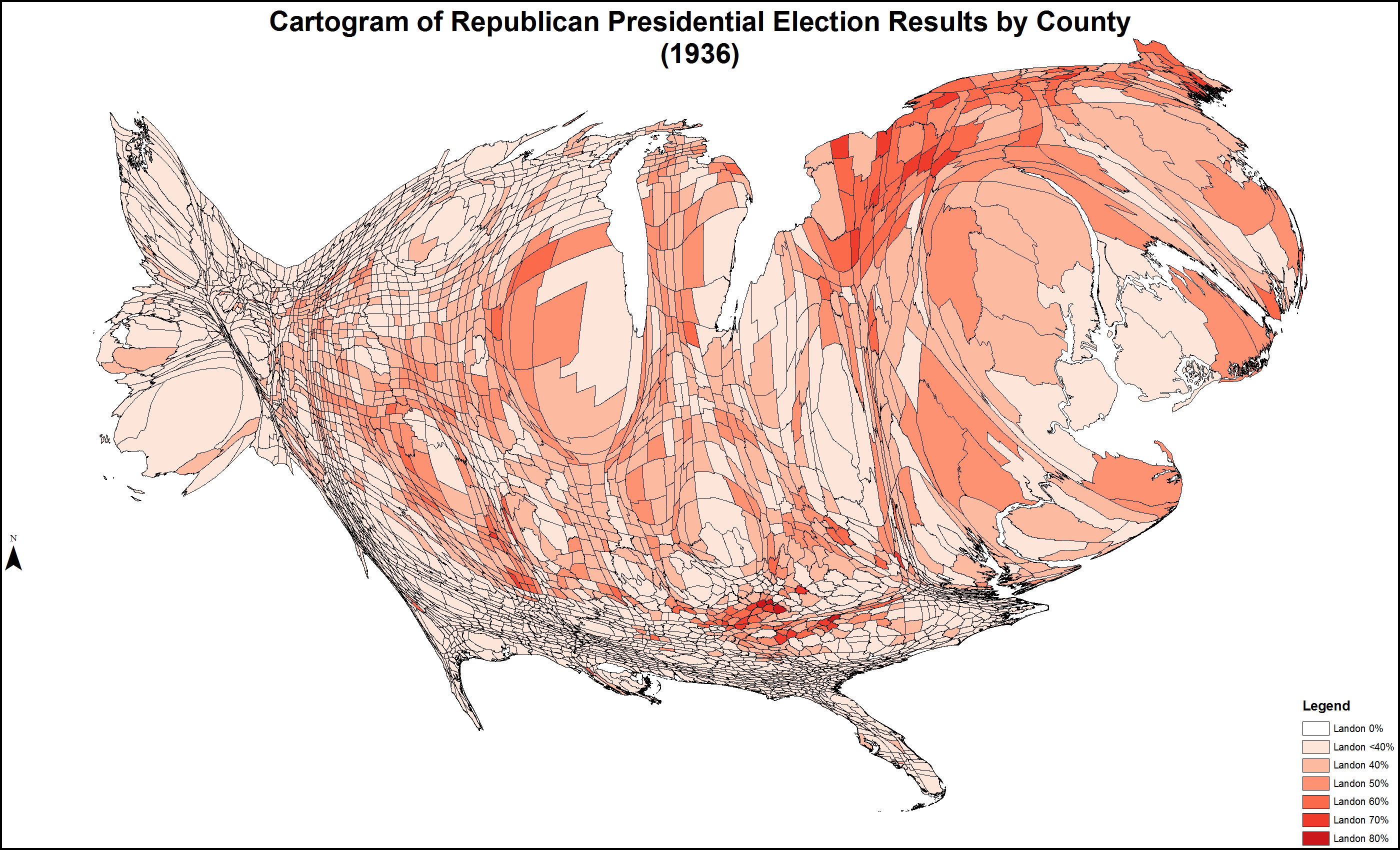
Cartogram of Republican presidential election results by county

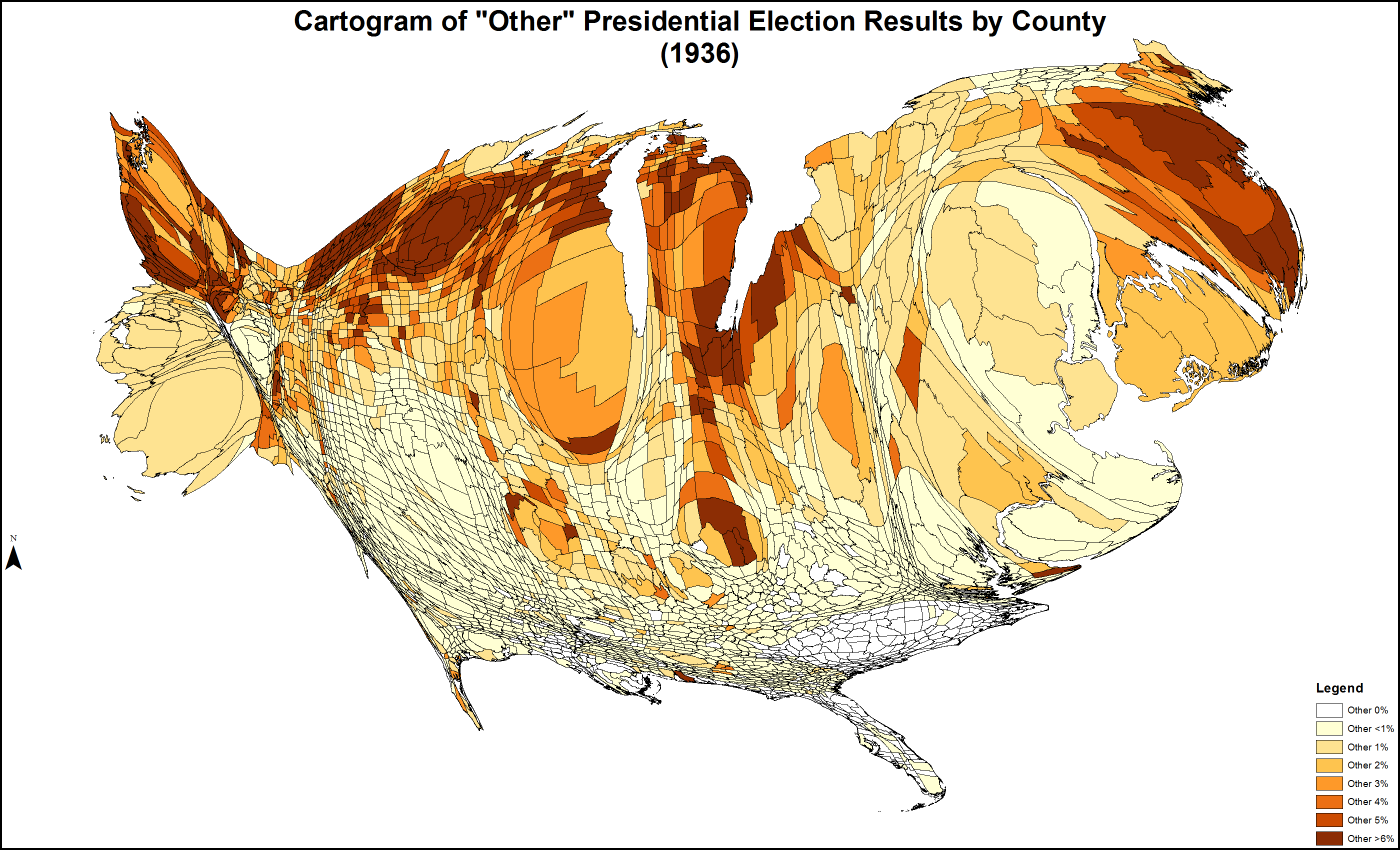
Cartogram of "Other" presidential election results by county

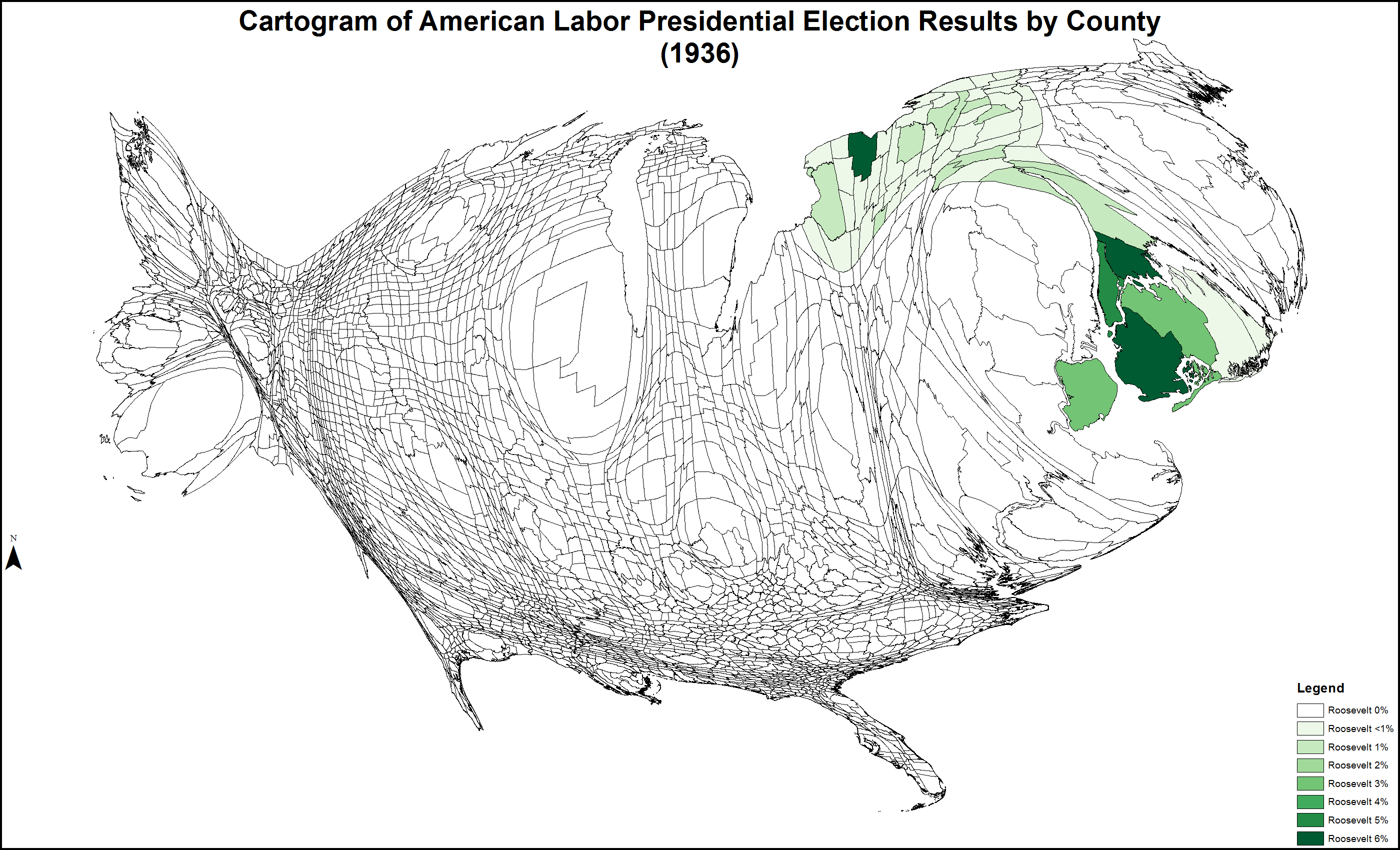
Cartogram of American Labor presidential election results by county

State Level Performance for Norman Thomas' Presidential Campaign, 1936 (Socialist Party)

=== Results by state ===
States/districts won by Roosevelt/Garner
States/districts won by Landon/Knox

		Franklin D. Roosevelt Democratic			Alfred Landon Republican			William Lemke Union			Norman Thomas Socialist			Other			Margin		Margin Swing (Note: Percentage point difference in margin from the 1932 election)	State total	
State	electoral votes	#	%	electoral votes	#	%	electoral votes	#	%	electoral votes	#	%	electoral votes	#	%	electoral votes	#	%	%	#	
Alabama	11	238,136	86.38	11	35,358	12.82	-	551	0.20	-	242	0.09	-	1,397	0.51	-	202,838	73.56	2.95	275,244	AL
Arizona	3	86,722	69.85	3	33,433	26.93	-	3,307	2.66	-	317	0.26	-	384	0.31	-	53,289	42.92	6.42	124,163	AZ
Arkansas	9	146,765	81.80	9	32,039	17.86	-	4	0.00	-	446	0.25	-	169	0.09	-	114,726	63.94	-9.12	179,423	AR
California	22	1,766,836	66.95	22	836,431	31.70	-	-	-	-	11,331	0.43	-	24,284	0.92	-	930,405	35.26	14.26	2,638,882	CA
Colorado	6	295,021	60.37	6	181,267	37.09	-	9,962	2.04	-	1,593	0.33	-	841	0.17	-	113,754	23.28	9.90	488,684	CO
Connecticut	8	382,129	55.32	8	278,685	40.35	-	21,805	3.16	-	5,683	0.82	-	2,421	0.35	-	103,444	14.98	16.12	690,723	CT
Delaware	3	69,702	54.62	3	57,236	44.85	-	442	0.35	-	172	0.13	-	51	0.04	-	12,466	9.77	12.21	127,603	DE
Florida	7	249,117	76.10	7	78,248	23.90	-	-	-	-	-	-	-	-	-	-	170,869	52.20	2.56	327,365	FL
Georgia	12	255,364	87.10	12	36,942	12.60	-	141	0.05	-	68	0.02	-	660	0.23	-	218,422	74.50	-9.33	293,175	GA
Idaho	4	125,683	62.96	4	66,256	33.19	-	7,678	3.85	-	-	-	-	-	-	-	59,427	29.77	9.38	199,617	ID
Illinois	29	2,282,999	57.70	29	1,570,393	39.69	-	89,439	2.26	-	7,530	0.19	-	6,161	0.16	-	712,606	18.01	4.82	3,956,522	IL
Indiana	14	934,974	56.63	14	691,570	41.89	-	19,407	1.18	-	3,856	0.23	-	1,090	0.07	-	243,404	14.74	3.02	1,650,897	IN
Iowa	11	621,756	54.41	11	487,977	42.70	-	29,687	2.60	-	1,373	0.12	-	1,940	0.17	-	133,779	11.71	-6.00	1,142,733	IA
Kansas	9	464,520	53.67	9	397,727	45.95	-	497	0.06	-	2,770	0.32	-	-	-	-	66,793	7.72	-1.71	865,014	KS
Kentucky	11	541,944	58.51	11	369,702	39.92	-	12,501	1.35	-	632	0.07	-	1,424	0.15	-	172,242	18.60	-0.31	926,203	KY
Louisiana	10	292,894	88.82	10	36,791	11.16	-	-	-	-	-	-	-	93	0.00	-	256,103	77.66	-8.11	329,778	LA
Maine	5	126,333	41.52	-	168,823	55.49	5	7,581	2.49	-	783	0.26	-	720	0.24	-	-42,490	-13.97	-1.33	304,240	ME
Maryland	8	389,612	62.35	8	231,435	37.04	-	-	-	-	1,629	0.26	-	2,220	0.36	-	158,177	25.31	-0.15	624,896	MD
Massachusetts	17	942,716	51.22	17	768,613	41.76	-	118,639	6.45	-	5,111	0.28	-	5,278	0.29	-	174,103	9.46	5.46	1,840,357	MA
Michigan	19	1,016,794	56.33	19	699,733	38.76	-	75,795	4.20	-	8,208	0.45	-	4,568	0.25	-	317,061	17.56	9.64	1,805,098	MI
Minnesota	11	698,811	61.84	11	350,461	31.01	-	74,296	6.58	-	2,872	0.25	-	3,535	0.31	-	348,350	30.83	7.21	1,129,975	MN
Mississippi	9	157,318	97.06	9	4,443	2.74	-	-	-	-	329	0.20	-	-	-	-	152,875	94.31	1.87	162,090	MS
Missouri	15	1,111,043	60.76	15	697,891	38.16	-	14,630	0.80	-	3,454	0.19	-	1,617	0.09	-	413,152	22.59	-6.03	1,828,635	MO
Montana	4	159,690	69.28	4	63,598	27.59	-	5,549	2.41	-	1,066	0.46	-	609	0.26	-	96,092	41.69	18.96	230,512	MT
Nebraska	7	347,445	57.14	7	247,731	40.74	-	12,847	2.11	-	-	-	-	-	-	-	99,714	16.40	-11.30	608,023	NE
Nevada	3	31,925	72.81	3	11,923	27.19	-	-	-	-	-	-	-	-	-	-	20,002	45.62	6.80	43,848	NV
New Hampshire	4	108,460	49.73	4	104,642	47.98	-	4,819	2.21	-	-	-	-	193	0.09	-	3,818	1.75	3.18	218,114	NH
New Jersey	16	1,083,850	59.54	16	720,322	39.57	-	9,407	0.52	-	3,931	0.22	-	2,927	0.16	-	364,128	19.97	18.07	1,820,437	NJ
New Mexico	3	106,037	62.69	3	61,727	36.50	-	924	0.55	-	343	0.20	-	105	0.06	-	44,310	26.20	-0.76	169,176	NM
New York	47	3,293,222	58.85	47	2,180,670	38.97	-	-	-	-	86,897	1.55	-	35,609	0.64	-	1,112,552	19.88	7.15	5,596,398	NY
North Carolina	13	616,141	73.40	13	223,283	26.60	-	2	0.00	-	21	0.00	-	17	0.00	-	392,858	46.80	6.15	839,464	NC
North Dakota	4	163,148	59.60	4	72,751	26.58	-	36,708	13.41	-	552	0.20	-	557	0.20	-	90,397	33.03	-8.55	273,716	ND
Ohio	26	1,747,140	57.99	26	1,127,855	37.44	-	132,212	4.39	-	117	0.00	-	5,265	0.17	-	619,285	20.56	17.71	3,012,589	OH
Oklahoma	11	501,069	66.83	11	245,122	32.69	-	-	-	-	2,221	0.30	-	1,328	0.18	-	255,947	34.14	-12.45	749,740	OK
Oregon	5	266,733	64.42	5	122,706	29.64	-	21,831	5.27	-	2,143	0.52	-	608	0.15	-	144,027	34.79	13.68	414,021	OR
Pennsylvania	36	2,353,987	56.88	36	1,690,200	40.84	-	67,468	1.63	-	14,599	0.35	-	12,172	0.29	-	663,787	16.04	21.55	4,138,426	PA
Rhode Island	4	165,238	53.10	4	125,031	40.18	-	19,569	6.29	-	-	-	-	1,340	0.43	-	40,207	12.92	1.15	311,178	RI
South Carolina	8	113,791	98.57	8	1,646	1.43	-	-	-	-	-	-	-	-	-	-	112,145	97.15	1.02	115,437	SC
South Dakota	4	160,137	54.02	4	125,977	42.49	-	10,338	3.49	-	-	-	-	-	-	-	34,160	11.52	-17.71	296,472	SD
Tennessee	11	328,083	68.85	11	146,520	30.75	-	296	0.06	-	686	0.14	-	953	0.20	-	181,563	38.10	4.09	476,538	TN
Texas	23	734,485	87.08	23	103,874	12.31	-	3,281	0.39	-	1,075	0.13	-	767	0.09	-	630,611	74.76	-1.96	843,482	TX
Utah	4	150,246	69.34	4	64,555	29.79	-	1,121	0.52	-	432	0.20	-	323	0.15	-	85,691	39.55	24.08	216,677	UT
Vermont	3	62,124	43.24	-	81,023	56.39	3	-	-	-	-	-	-	542	0.38	-	-18,899	-13.15	3.43	143,689	VT
Virginia	11	234,980	70.23	11	98,336	29.39	-	233	0.07	-	313	0.09	-	728	0.22	-	136,644	40.84	2.46	334,590	VA
Washington	8	459,579	66.38	8	206,892	29.88	-	17,463	2.52	-	3,496	0.50	-	4,908	0.71	-	252,687	36.50	12.98	692,338	WA
West Virginia	8	502,582	60.56	8	325,358	39.20	-	-	-	-	832	0.10	-	1,173	0.14	-	177,224	21.35	11.35	829,945	WV
Wisconsin	12	802,984	63.80	12	380,828	30.26	-	60,297	4.79	-	10,626	0.84	-	3,825	0.30	-	422,156	33.54	1.28	1,258,560	WI
Wyoming	3	62,624	60.58	3	38,739	37.47	-	1,653	1.60	-	200	0.19	-	166	0.16	-	23,885	23.10	7.85	103,382	WY
TOTALS:	531	27,752,648	60.80	523	16,681,862	36.54	8	892,378	1.95	-	187,910	0.41	-	132,901	0.29	-	11,070,786	24.25	6.49	45,647,699	US

==== States that flipped from Republican to Democratic ====
- Connecticut
- Delaware
- New Hampshire
- Pennsylvania

==== Close states ====
Margin of victory less than 5% (4 electoral votes):

1. New Hampshire, 1.75% (3,818 votes)

Margin of victory greater than 5% but less than 10% (29 electoral votes):

1. Kansas, 7.72% (66,793 votes)
2. Massachusetts, 9.46% (174,103 votes)
3. Delaware, 9.77% (12,466 votes)

Tipping point state:

1. Ohio, 20.56% (619,285 votes)

==== Statistics ====
Counties with Highest Percent of Vote (Democratic)

1. Issaquena County, Mississippi 100.00%
2. Horry County, South Carolina 100.00%
3. Lancaster County, South Carolina 100.00%
4. Greensville County, Virginia 100.00%
5. Edgefield County, South Carolina 99.92%

Counties with Highest Percent of Vote (Republican)

1. Jackson County, Kentucky 89.05%
2. Johnson County, Tennessee 84.39%
3. Owsley County, Kentucky 83.02%
4. Leslie County, Kentucky 81.39%
5. Avery County, North Carolina 77.98%

Counties with Highest Percent of Vote (Other)

1. Burke County, North Dakota 31.63%
2. Sheridan County, North Dakota 28.88%
3. Hettinger County, North Dakota 28.25%
4. Mountrail County, North Dakota 25.73%
5. Steele County, North Dakota 24.30%

== See also ==
- History of the United States (1918–1945)
- 1936 United States House of Representatives elections
- 1936 United States Senate elections
- Second inauguration of Franklin D. Roosevelt

== Works cited ==
- Hair, William Ivy (1991). The Kingfish and His Realm: The Life and Times of Huey P. Long. Baton Rouge: Louisiana State University Press. ISBN 9780807141069.
- Sanson, Jerry P. (Summer 2006). ""What He Did and What He Promised to Do... ": Huey Long and the Horizons of Louisiana Politics". The Journal of Louisiana Historical. 47 (3): 261–276. JSTOR 4234200.
- Sherman, Richard (1973). The Republican Party and Black America From McKinley to Hoover 1896-1933. University of Virginia Press. ISBN 0813904676.
- Snyder, Robert E. (Spring 1975). "Huey Long and the Presidential Election of 1936". The Journal of Louisiana Historical. 16 (2): 117–143. JSTOR 4231456.
