= Courtin' Wildcats =

1929 film

- Directed by: Jerome Storm
- Written by: Dudley McKenna
- Produced by: Hoot Gibson
- Starring: Hoot Gibson
- Cinematography: Harry Neuman
- Distributed by: Universal Pictures
- Release date: December 22, 1929
- Running time: 6 reels
- Country: United States
- Language: English

Courtin' Wildcats is a 1929 American comedy Western film directed by Jerome Storm and produced by and starring Hoot Gibson. The soundtrack was recorded using the Western Electric sound-on-film system. The film based on the short story "Courtin' Calamity" by William Dudley Pelley, which had previously been filmed in 1924 as the silent western The Sawdust Trail. It was distributed through the Universal Pictures. A silent version was also produced for theatres unequipped with sound equipment.

== Cast ==
- Hoot Gibson as Clarence Butts
- Eugenia Gilbert as Calamity Jane
- Harry Todd as McKenzie
- Joseph W. Girard as Mr. Butts
- Monte Montague as McLaren
- John Oscar as Quid Johnson
- Jim Corey as The Fugitive
- James Farley as The Doctor
- Pete Morrison as Huxley
- Joe Bonomo as Gorilla

== Preservation status ==
A print of Courtin' Wildcats is preserved by the Library of Congress.

== See also ==
- List of early sound feature films (1926–1929)
