= The Sawdust Trail =

1924 film directed by Edward Sedgwick

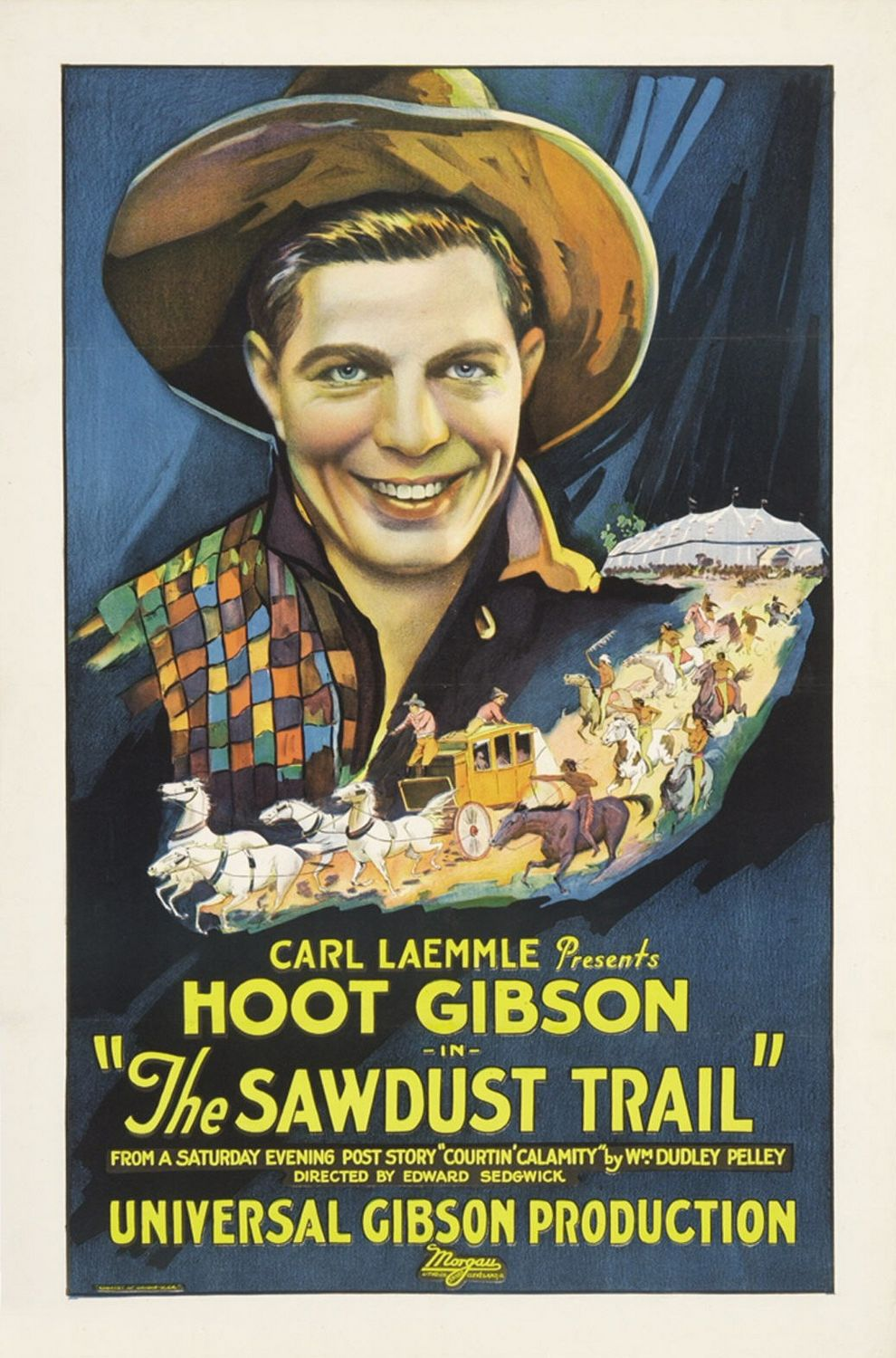
- Poster
- Directed by: Edward Sedgwick
- Screenplay by: Raymond L. Schrock (adaptation); E. Richard Schayer (scenario)
- Based on: "Courtin' Calamity" by William Dudley Pelley
- Produced by: Carl Laemmle; Hoot Gibson
- Starring: Hoot Gibson
- Cinematography: Virgil Miller
- Distributed by: Universal Pictures
- Release date: August 10, 1924
- Running time: 60 minutes; 6 reels
- Country: United States
- Languages: Silent; English intertitles

The Sawdust Trail is a 1924 American silent Western film produced and distributed by Universal Pictures and starring Hoot Gibson. Edward Sedgwick directed. It is based on the short story "Courtin' Calamity" by William Dudley Pelley, which was later filmed as a part-talkie in 1929 as Courtin' Wildcats.

== Plot ==
As described in a film magazine, Clarence Elwood Butts (Gibson) was one of his university's best customers, having been there seven years. His wealthy father Jonathan Butts (Torrence) wanted to put him to work in his factory, but Clarence, who hated the prospect, evaded it by pretending to be weak and delicate. Finally a doctor's examination discovered his perfect health, at the same time that an outraged prohibition officer was looking for him to pay a reward for a blackened eye received in a café fight the night before. Clarence denied the officer's charge and played "sissy," but the doctor, in private, called him "the best liar I've ever known." However, the physician "kept mum," and finally advised working in a wild west show. Tickled at the prospect, Clarence nevertheless had to go into it as a weakling to keep up the pretense. The leading woman of the show was "Calamity June" (Sedgwick), so called because she was a man-hater, carried a pair of wicked guns, and used them and her temper when any man spoke to her. Clarence made the fatal mistake of flirting with her right off the bat. "Calamity June" stood for this with a steely eye, but she made a "sap" out of Clarence by having him ride a bronco that threw him. Undismayed by her hardness, he continued to "fuss around" her. On her birthday he gave her a pair of boxing gloves and sneaked outside the tent where he stood laughing. "Calamity June" stole up on his shadow inside the tent, wearing the gloves, knocked him out through the tent wall and then rushed outside and completed the job. Unwilling to hit her, he suffered the ignominy of being knocked down five times. The manager of the show cursed him for being a troublemaker. Clarence added to the consternation of the general staff by licking a man about twice his size. There came a day when, just before the show started, "Calamity June" sat on a barrel. Clarence tipped a "bum" five dollars to give the barrel a kick. It was highly successful. "Calamity June" started firing and the crowd went crazy. The "bum" fell in agony. "Calamity" ran to her horse and was gone like a flash. Into his speedster went Clarence and after her with the speed demon in him on top. He had sworn to make her eat out of his hand, literally. Jerking her from her horse as he went by her, he carried the woman many miles faster than the speedometer could tell. "Calamity June," up against a real, reckless speed demon, whimpered and begged for mercy, and then suddenly made an "S" turn in the road at sixty-five m.p.h. resulting in the car smashed at the bottom of a hill. What then happened completes the story of a tame man and how he made a "wild woman" eat out of his hand.

== Cast ==
- Hoot Gibson as Clarence Elwood Butts
- Josie Sedgwick as "Calamity" Jane Webster
- David Torrence as Jonathan Butts
- Charles K. French as Square Deal McKenzie
- Harry Todd as Quid Jackson
- G. Raymond Nye as Gorilla Lawson
- Pat Harmon as Ranch Foreman
- Taylor Carroll as Lafe Webster
- W.T. McCulley as Red McLaren

== Preservation ==
With no prints of The Sawdust Trail located in any film archives, it is a lost film.

== See also ==
- Hoot Gibson filmography
