= Silver Legion of America =

Fascist paramilitary group (1933–1941)

- Other name: Silver Shirts
- Leader: William Dudley Pelley
- Founded: January 31, 1933
- Dissolved: 1941
- Headquarters: Asheville, North Carolina
- Publications: Several magazines and newspapers
- Political wing: Christian Party
- Membership: approx. 15,000 (c. 1934)
- Ideology: Esoteric fascism; White supremacy; White nationalism; Non-interventionism
- Political position: Radical right
- Religion: Liberation Doctrine
- Active regions: Midwest and the PNW
- Colors: Silver Scarlet Blue
- Slogan: "Loyalty, Liberation, and Legion"
- Anthem: "Battle Hymn of the Republic" [1908 recording]

Party flag

The Silver Legion of America, commonly known as the Silver Shirts, was an American fascist and pro-Nazi organization which was founded by William Dudley Pelley and headquartered in Asheville, North Carolina.

== History ==
Pelley was a former journalist, novelist and screenwriter turned spiritualist who began to promote antisemitic views by 1931, including the belief that Jews were possessed by demons. He formed the Silver Legion with the goal of bringing about a "spiritual and political renewal", inspired by the success of Adolf Hitler's Nazi movement in Germany.

A nationalist, fascist group, the paramilitary Silver Legion wore a uniform modeled after the Nazis' brown shirts (SA), consisting of a silver shirt with a blue tie, along with a campaign hat and blue corduroy trousers with leggings. The uniform shirts bore a scarlet letter L over the heart, which according to Pelley was "standing for Love, Loyalty, and Liberation." The organizational flag was a plain silver field with a red L in the canton on the upper left hand corner. By 1934, the Legion claimed that it had 15,000 members.

== Congressional investigations ==
The McCormack–Dickstein Committee, the House Special Committee on Un-American Activities created in March 1934, held hearings in Washington, New York, Chicago, Los Angeles, Newark, and Asheville between April and December 1934. Marine Corps infiltrators Virgil Hayes and Edward Grey testified in August 1934 that Silver Shirts in San Diego had planned to seize City Hall around May Day 1934 and sought stolen military arms. When asked the group's purpose, Hayes stated: "To change the government, William Dudley Pelley, the national organizer told me." The committee submitted its final report on February 15, 1935.

The Dies Committee called Pelley to testify in February 1940. He surrendered himself to the committee in Washington, where one observer remarked he "jumped on the committee's lap… like an unwelcome dog." During testimony, Pelley stated he would imprison Senators Robert M. La Follette Jr. and Samuel Dickstein and labour leader John L. Lewis for life. The committee found that Pelley had disseminated German Ministry of Propaganda material while concealing its origins from his own members, and that the Silver Legion operated chapters in Detroit, New York, Boston, Windsor, Ontario, and Villa Acuña, Mexico. A government infiltrator testified that Pelley sought to become "dictator of the United States."

== Ties to Nazi Germany ==
The Silver Legion maintained direct connections with Nazi Germany and its American affiliates. German-made sidearms were ordered for Silver Shirt members, and the organisation cooperated with the Friends of New Germany. One Silver Shirt communiqué instructed recipients to "Destroy if in danger of being taken — Never Surrender them."

Pelley reprinted articles from the Nazi Deutsche Zeitung published in New York, which in turn reprinted his anti-Jewish attacks. He claimed "divine" foreknowledge that "a young house painter in Germany would rise and clear his country of the Jews."

== Regional activity ==
=== Minnesota ===
The Minnesota Silver Shirts claimed approximately 6,000 members statewide, with roughly 800 in Minneapolis. Roy Zachary, the national field organiser, held rallies at the Royal Arcanum hall in Minneapolis on July 29 and August 2, 1938, where he called for a vigilante attack on Teamsters Local 544. The union responded by forming a "union defense guard." Rabbi Albert Gordon of Adath Jeshurun publicly identified local business figures, including George K. Belden of the Minneapolis industrial association, who had attended the rallies.

=== Washington state ===
A Silver Shirt office opened in downtown Spokane in 1936, eventually attracting about 200 members. On July 18, 1938, approximately 700 protesters carrying signs reading "This is Spokane, Not Berlin" confronted a Roy Zachary speech. Eleven were arrested. Zachary declared that eliminating "communism and Jews… will not be with the ballot, but with guns, wading in blood." Charges against the protesters were later dropped.

A "Silver Lodge" was established at Redmond, Washington around 1936.

=== California ===
The San Diego chapter drew particular scrutiny during the 1934 McCormack–Dickstein hearings. Willard Kemp commanded the Southern California Legion and became Pelley's running mate in the 1936 presidential election. The organisation operated an "Aryan Book Store" in Los Angeles.

=== Illinois ===
Silver Shirt meetings in Chicago ended in riots in 1938; Zachary was fined $15 for disorderly conduct. In 1939, members smashed windows of the Goldblatt Brothers department store.

== Legal troubles ==
=== North Carolina securities fraud (1934–1935) ===
In August 1934, North Carolina authorities charged Pelley with violating state blue sky laws for misrepresenting the value of Galahad Press stock. He was convicted in January 1935 and received a fine and suspended sentence.

=== Federal receivership (1934) ===
In July 1934, a federal court placed the Silver Legion under receivership. Special master George W. Craig signed the order taking control of Pelley's operations "lock, stock and barrel."

=== Sedition conviction (1942) ===
Following the attack on Pearl Harbor, Pelley's magazine The Galilean published an editorial titled "We Fight for This Republic Only" (February 16, 1942) and statements claiming that Pearl Harbor damage was worse than the government admitted. In April 1942, a federal grand jury in Indianapolis indicted him on eleven counts. U.S. Attorney B. Howard Caughran stated Pelley was "the fifth person to be accused of sedition since the United States' entry into the war."

The trial ran from July to August 1942. Charles Lindbergh appeared as a defence witness. On August 13, 1942, Judge Robert C. Baltzell sentenced Pelley to 15 years for sedition and conspiracy to commit sedition, including making seditious statements, obstructing military recruiting, and fomenting insurrection within the military. The conviction was affirmed on appeal (United States v. Pelley, 132 F.2d 170, 7th Cir. 1942) and certiorari was denied by the Supreme Court (318 U.S. 764, 1943).

=== Great Sedition Trial (1944) ===
Pelley was among approximately 30 defendants in United States v. McWilliams (1944), alongside George Sylvester Viereck, Elizabeth Dilling, Gerald Winrod, and German American Bund leaders. Prosecutor O. John Rogge sought to prove the defendants had echoed Nazi propaganda. The trial ended in a mistrial on November 29, 1944, following the death of Judge Edward C. Eicher.

== Publications ==
The Silver Legion published several periodicals: Liberation (the national weekly, edited by Pelley), Pelley's Weekly, the Silvershirt Weekly, The New Liberator, The Galilean, and later Roll Call. The organisation also published recruitment literature including One Million Silver Shirts by 1939, which outlined plans to restrict Jewish property rights and dismantle the New Deal.

Liberation suspended publication in 1934 when Galahad Press entered bankruptcy.

== Dissolution and aftermath ==
Pelley formally disbanded the Silver Legion shortly after the December 1941 attack on Pearl Harbor. In December 1940, two moving vans had transported files and printing equipment from the Asheville headquarters to Noblesville, Indiana. In a Christmas Day 1940 interview, Pelley claimed he had already dissolved the Silver Shirts.

On January 20, 1942, Pelley was sentenced to serve two to three years in prison by Superior Court Judge F. Don Phillips, in Asheville, North Carolina, for violating terms of probation of a 1935 conviction for violating North Carolina security laws. The same sentence had been suspended pending good behavior, but the court found that during that period, Pelley had published false and libelous statements, published inaccurate reports and advertising, and supported a secret military organization. For claiming that the devastation of the Pacific Fleet at Pearl Harbor was worse than the government claimed, Pelley was arrested by federal authorities and sentenced to 15 years in prison for sedition and conspiracy to commit sedition, including for making seditious statements, obstructing military recruiting, and fomenting insurrection within the military.

Pelley was paroled on February 14, 1950. He died on June 30, 1965. His New York Times obituary described him as "an agitator without a significant following."

== See also ==
- Christian Party (United States, 1930s)
- German American Bund
- Political uniform
- Ulrich Fleischhauer
