= William Dudley Pelley =

American fascist political leader (1890–1965)

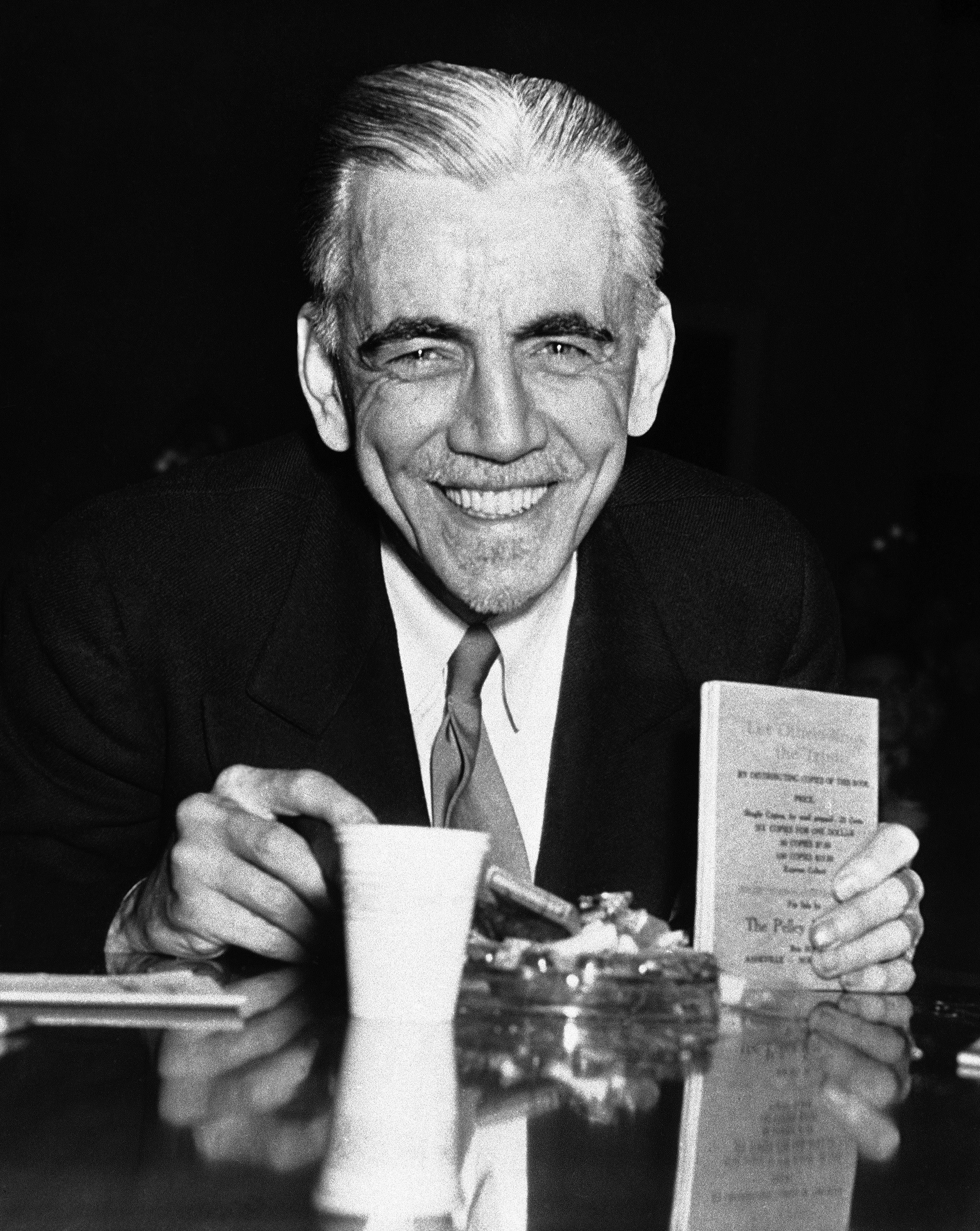
- Pelley c. 1936
- Born: March 12, 1890; Lynn, Massachusetts, U.S.
- Died: June 30, 1965 (aged 75); Noblesville, Indiana, U.S.
- Resting place: Crownland Cemetery, Noblesville, Indiana
- Occupations: American fascist leader Journalist; Screenwriter
- Known for: Founding the Silver Legion of America and the Christian Party
- Status: Deceased
- Convictions: Sedition (50 U.S.C. § 33) (10 counts); Seditious conspiracy (50 U.S.C. § 34)
- Penalty: 15 years imprisonment
- Wanted by: Asheville Police Department; Buncombe County Sheriff's Department; United States Military Police; United States Department of Justice
- Writing career
- Language: English
- Genres: Fiction; Political journalism
- Notable works: The Continental Angle; The Face in the Window; Seven Minutes in Eternity
- Notable awards: 2 O. Henry Awards

Chairman of the Christian Party
- In office January 30, 1935 – December 7, 1941
- Preceded by: position established
- Succeeded by: position abolished

Personal details
- Party: Christian Party
- Spouse: Agnes Marion Henderson-Pelley

William Dudley Pelley (March 12, 1890 – June 30, 1965) was an American fascist activist, journalist, writer, and occultist. He was noted for his support of Nazi Germany dictator Adolf Hitler during the Great Depression and Second World War.

Pelley initially gained prominence as a writer, winning two O. Henry Awards and penning screenplays for Hollywood films. His 1929 essay "Seven Minutes in Eternity," published in The American Magazine, was a popular example of what would later be termed a near-death experience and marked a turning point in his career. His antisemitism led him to found the Silver Legion of America in 1933, a fascist paramilitary organization. He ran for president in 1936 as the candidate of his fascist Christian Party.

In 1942, the U.S. government prosecuted Pelley for sedition and seditious conspiracy, alleging he conspired to cause insubordination in the military and obstruct recruitment. He was found guilty and sentenced to 15 years in federal prison. Pelley was released on parole in February 1950 under the condition that he cease his political activities.

Upon his death in 1965, The New York Times assessed Pelley as "an agitator without a significant following."

== Early life ==
William Dudley Pelley was born in Lynn, Massachusetts, to William George Apsey Pelley and Grace (née Goodale). He grew up in poverty. His father was initially a Southern Methodist Church minister, later a small businessman and shoemaker.

== Early career ==
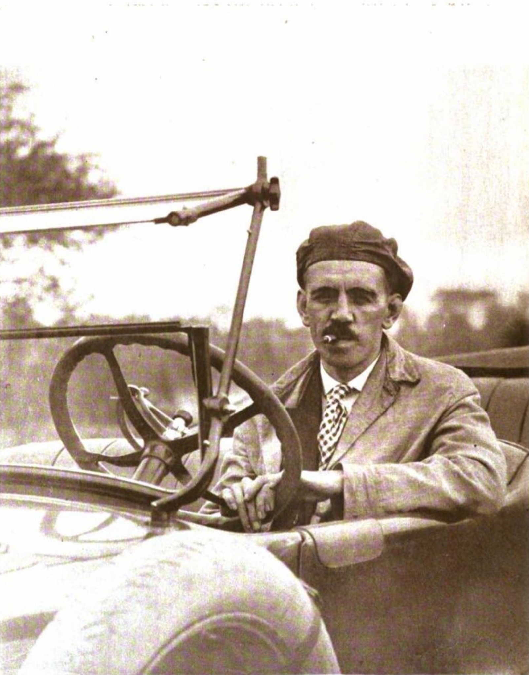
Pelley in The American Magazine (March 1918)

Largely self-educated, Pelley became a journalist and gained respect for his writing skills. His articles eventually appeared in national publications such as the Chicago Tribune. Two of his short stories received O. Henry awards: "The Face in the Window" in 1920 and "The Continental Angle" in 1930. He was hired by the Methodist Centenary to study Methodist missions around the world. He joined the Red Cross in Siberia, where he helped the White Russians during the Russian Civil War. Pelley's opposition to Communism grew, and he began to subscribe to the conspiracy theory of Jewish Communism. Upon returning to the United States in 1920, Pelley wrote novels in addition to his journalism. In the 1920s, his short stories frequently appeared in pulp magazines such as Adventure and Short Stories, and mainstream journals such as The American Magazine and The Red Book. He went to Hollywood, where he became a screenwriter, writing for the Lon Chaney films The Light in the Dark (1922) and The Shock (1923). Pelley became disillusioned with the film industry. What he regarded as unfair treatment by Jewish studio executives increased his antisemitic inclinations. He moved to New York, and then to Asheville, North Carolina, in 1932, and began publishing magazines and essays detailing his new religious system, the "Liberation Doctrine".

== Occultism ==
In May 1928, Pelley gained notoriety when he claimed he had three out-of-body experiences in which he traveled to other planes of existence devoid of corporeal souls. The first took place while alone in a cabin in Altadena, California. He described this experience in the article "My Seven Minutes in Eternity" (Mind, Inc., May 1929), published in book form in 1933 as Seven Minutes in Eternity: With the Aftermath. In later writings, he described the experience as "hypo-dimensional".

The second took place while he was at home in California reading a Ralph Waldo Emerson essay. The third took place in New Mexico, while he was alone in a train car—again reading Emerson. He wrote that during the last event, he met with God and Jesus, who instructed him to undertake the spiritual transformation of America.

He later claimed that the experiences gave him the ability to levitate, see through walls, and have out-of-body experiences at will. He also said that they removed his desire for alcohol, tobacco, and caffeine, as well as curing physical ailments such as indigestion.

His metaphysical writings greatly boosted his public visibility. Some of the early members of the original Ascended Master Teachings religion, the "I AM" Activity, were recruited from the ranks of Pelley's organization, the Silver Legion of America. Pelley's religious system was a mixture of theosophy, spiritualism, Rosicrucianism, and pyramidism. He considered it to be a perfected form of Christianity, in which "Dark Souls" (Jews, Communists and Papists) represented the forces of evil.

== Political activism ==
When the Great Depression struck America in 1929, Pelley became active in politics. After moving to Asheville, Pelley founded Galahad College in 1932. The college specialized in correspondence courses on "Social Metaphysics" and "Christian Economics". He also founded Galahad Press, which he used to publish various political and metaphysical magazines, newspapers, and books – many of which Pelley claimed to have transcribed from souls in another dimension. The publishing house and college both failed within a year.

On January 30, 1933, Adolf Hitler became chancellor of Germany. Pelley, an admirer of Hitler, founded the Silver Legion, an antisemitic organization whose members, known as Silver Shirts and Christian Patriots, wore Nazi-style silver uniform shirts. Their insignia was a scarlet L, emblazoned on their flags and uniforms. They also wore blue neckties, blue corduroy trousers, and puttees. Pelley preferred to be called "Chief" of the Silver Shirts. Biographer Scott Beekman noted that Pelley was "one of the first Americans to create an organization celebrating the work of Adolf Hitler."

Pelley traveled throughout the United States, holding recruitment rallies, lectures, and public speeches. He founded Silver Legion chapters in almost every state. Membership peaked at 15,000 in 1935, dropping to below 5,000 by 1938. His political ideology included anti-Communism, antisemitism, patriotism, corporatism, isolationism, and British Israelism. These themes were the primary focus of his numerous magazines and newspapers, which included Liberation, Pelley's Silvershirt Weekly, The Galilean, Silver Legion Ranger, and The New Liberator.

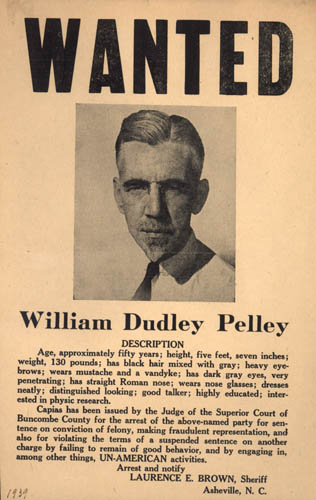
A wanted poster for Pelley

In his book No More Hunger, William Pelley called for populist economic policies, such as a universal income of $1,000 a year (over $24,677 in 2025) for White citizens and a ban on inheritance except for family homes, or limiting wages to $100,000 (over $2,467,700 in 2025) a year. He also called for African Americans to be re-enslaved and Jews to be ghettoized and sterilized.

Pelley became fairly well known as the 1930s progressed. Sinclair Lewis mentioned him by name in his novel It Can't Happen Here (1935) about a fictional fascist takeover in the United States. The leader of the fictional movement praises Pelley as an important precursor.

Pelley opposed Franklin Delano Roosevelt and the New Deal, claiming that they were part of a Jewish plot to control the U.S. government. Pelley founded the Christian Party in 1935 and ran an unsuccessful campaign in 1936 as its candidate for president, winning only 1,600 votes. He often spoke of protecting the U.S. Constitution. He also proposed turning the United States into a corporation, with all white Christian citizens as shareholders.

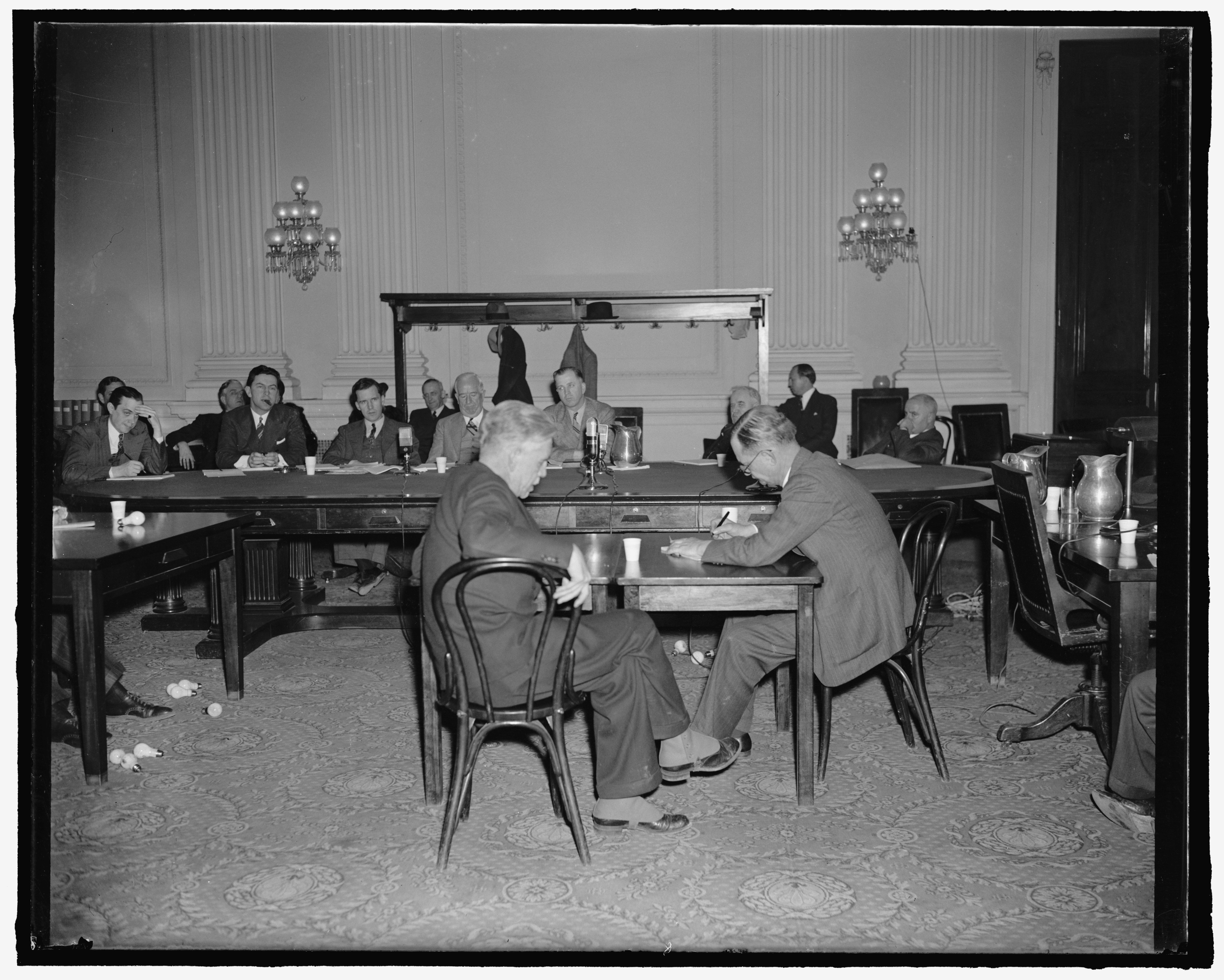
Pelley testifies before the Dies Committee, February 8, 1940

He engaged in a lengthy dispute with the United States House of Representatives' Dies Committee, a predecessor to the House Un-American Activities Committee.

Despite significant financial and material setbacks within his organization due to lengthy court battles, Pelley continued to oppose Roosevelt, especially as diplomatic relations between the United States and the Empire of Japan and Nazi Germany became strained in the early 1940s. Pelley accused Roosevelt of being a warmonger and advocated isolationism. Roosevelt enlisted J. Edgar Hoover and the Federal Bureau of Investigation (FBI) to investigate Pelley. Subsequently, the FBI interviewed subscribers to Pelley's newspapers and magazines.

Although the attack on Pearl Harbor in December 1941 led Pelley to disband the Silver Legion, he continued to attack the government in his magazine, Roll Call. This alarmed Roosevelt, Attorney General Francis Biddle, and the House Un-American Activities Committee. After stating in one issue of Roll Call that the devastation of the Pacific Fleet at Pearl Harbor was worse than the government claimed, Pelley was arrested at his new base of operations in Noblesville, Indiana. In April 1942, he was charged with 12 counts of sedition. Also charged were his secretary and future wife, Agnes Marion Henderson, his editor, Lawrence A. Brown, and his publishing company, Fellowship Press, Incorporated. One charge against Pelley was dropped, but he was convicted of the other 11 charges, mostly for making seditious statements, obstructing military recruiting, and fomenting insurrection within the military. Henderson and Brown were both acquitted on all counts, save for the charge of seditious conspiracy. Fellowship Press was also found guilty. The judge sentenced Pelley to 15 years in prison, Brown to five years, and Henderson to a two-year suspended term. He also imposed a $5,000 fine on Fellowship Press.

After serving eight years, Pelley was paroled in February 1950. While still incarcerated, he was one of 30 defendants in the "Mass Sedition Trial" of Nazi sympathizers which culminated in a mistrial after the death of the judge, Edward C. Eicher, in November 1944.

== Later life ==
In his final years, Pelley dealt with charges of securities fraud that had been brought against him while he was living in Asheville.

The terms of Pelley's parole stipulated that he remain in central Indiana and desist from all political activity. He developed an elaborate religious philosophy called "Soulcraft" based on his belief in UFOs and extraterrestrials. He published Star Guests in 1950. Pelley died at his home in Noblesville, Indiana, on June 30, 1965. He is buried in Crownland Cemetery, Noblesville.

== Filmography ==
- A Case at Law (1917)
- One-Thing-at-a-Time O'Day (1919)
- What Women Love (1920)
- The Light in the Dark (1922)
- Back Fire (1922)
- The Fog (1923)
- As a Man Lives (1923)
- Her Fatal Millions (1923)
- The Shock (1923)
- Ladies to Board (1924)
- The Sawdust Trail (1924)
- Torment (1924)
- The Ladybird (1927)
- The Sunset Derby (1927)
- Come Across (1929)
- Drag (1929)
- Courtin' Wildcats (1929)

== See also ==
- Charles Coughlin
- Order of Nine Angles
- Heinrich Himmler
- Esoteric fascism
- Emerald Tablet
- Fritz Kuhn
- Henry Ford
- Charles Lindbergh
- German American Bund
- Fifth column
