= Christian Party (United States, 1930s) =

American fascist political party

- Leader: William Dudley Pelley
- Founder: William Dudley Pelley
- Founded: August 16, 1935
- Dissolved: circa 1939
- Headquarters: Asheville, North Carolina, U.S
- Paramilitary wing: Silver Legion of America
- Ideology: American fascism Christian fascism Occult fascism
- Political position: Far-right
- Colors: Silver

The Christian Party was an American fascist political party which was founded by William Dudley Pelley in 1935. He chose August 16, 1935 as the Christian Party's founding date, because it was a so-called "pyramid date". The party can be considered the political wing of Pelley's paramilitary organization, the Silver Legion of America.

It ran with Pelley as its candidate for the 1936 presidential campaign (Willard Kemp, commander of the Silver Legion in Southern California, was the vice presidential candidate). Pelley gained just 1,600 votes in the election. The party quickly vanished after the United States entered World War II. The party's ideology was blended with a variety of occult beliefs held by Pelley.

== See also ==
- Radical right (United States)#Great Depression
