= Milo Reno =

American activist (1866–1936)

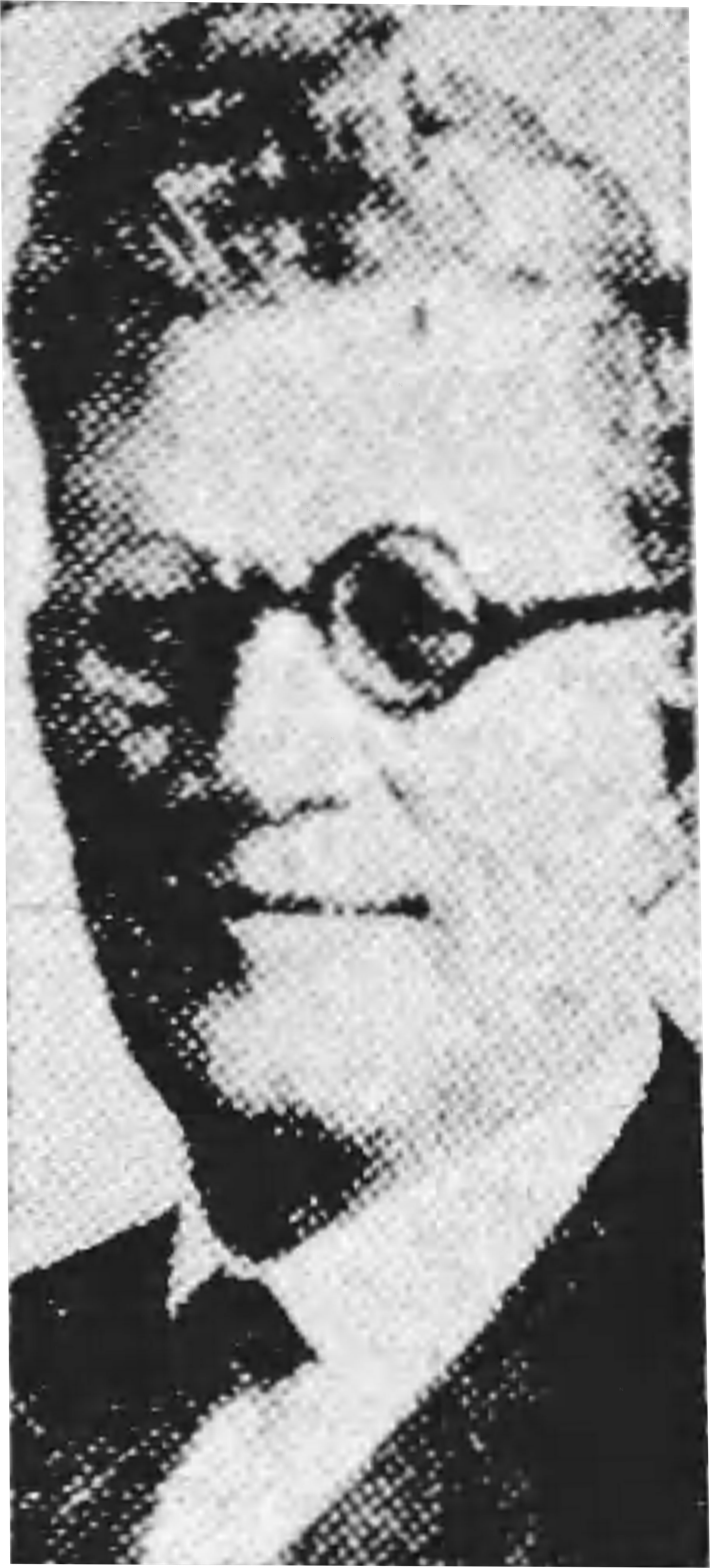
- Reno c. 1928
- Born: January 5, 1866; Wapello County, Iowa, U.S.
- Died: May 5, 1936 (aged 70); Excelsior Springs, Missouri, U.S.
- Parent(s): John and Elizabeth (Barrice) Reno

Milo Reno (January 5, 1866 – May 5, 1936) was president of the Iowa Farmers' Union from 1921 to 1930 and the leader of the Farmers' Holiday Association, a populist organization established in 1932. He was born in Wapello County, Iowa. He died in Excelsior Springs, Missouri, of a heart attack following influenza.

== Early career ==
Reno grew up in Iowa, in a family influenced by Populist politics. Reno was involved in organizing farmers. In 1918, he joined the Iowa Farmer Union and in 1921, he was elected its president. He called for better prices for farmers and public works programs, supported by a more inflationary monetary policy.

He supported Democratic Party candidates in both the 1928 elections (Al Smith) and the 1932 elections (Franklin Roosevelt). He later turned against Roosevelt and the Democratic Party and bitterly criticized the New Deal by supporting such figures as Father Coughlin.

== Farmers' Holiday Association ==
Reno's public persona is largely shaped by his leadership of the Farmers' Holiday Association, a Depression-era organization of farmers based in the Midwest that campaigned for populist measures including currency inflation, agricultural production, prices controls, and an end to foreclosures, including by forcibly preventing auctions of foreclosed farms. In October 1933, in reaction against the federal Agricultural Adjustment Act, Reno led the call for a "farm strike" until the demands were met. On October 30, this call received the support of the governors of North and South Dakota, Iowa, Minnesota, and Wisconsin.
