= Aladdin and the Wonderful Lamp (1917 film) =

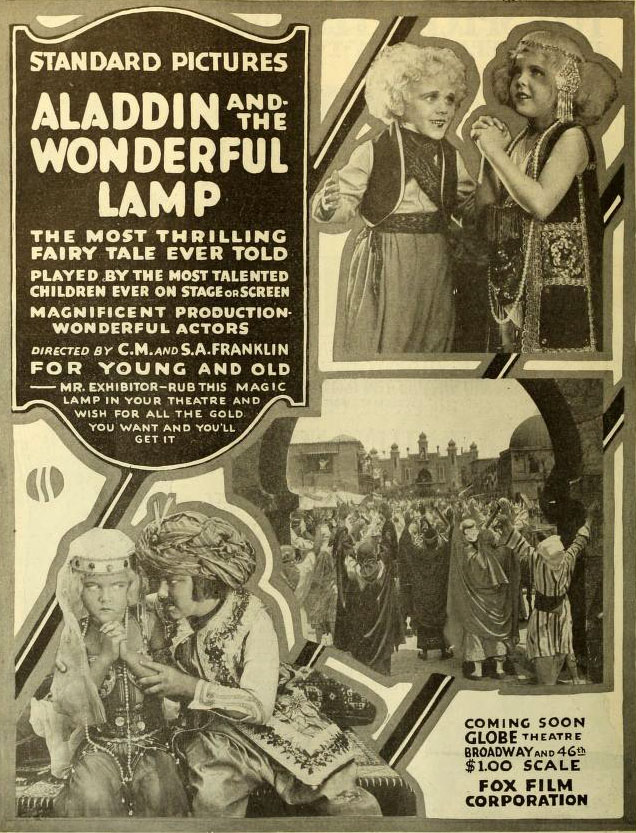
- Advertisement for the film
- Directed by: Chester Franklin; Sidney Franklin
- Written by: Bernard McConville
- Based on: Aladdin aka The Wonderful Lamp from The Arabian Nights written circa 950
- Produced by: William Fox
- Starring: Virginia Lee Corbin
- Cinematography: Harry Gerstad
- Distributed by: Fox Film Corporation
- Release date: October 11, 1917
- Running time: 80 minutes; 8 reels
- Country: USA
- Language: Silent..English intertitles

Aladdin and the Wonderful Lamp is a 1917 American silent fantasy film directed by Chester and Sidney Franklin and produced and distributed by Fox Film Corporation.

It is preserved in the George Eastman House, Cinemateca Do Museu De Arte Moderna and the Library of Congress however only a sped up 40 minute version is available.

== The Film ==
Aladdin and the Wonderful Lamp (1917)

== Plot ==
The story of Aladdin and the Princess Badr al-badr's adventures as told through child actors.

== Cast ==
- Francis Carpenter - Aladdin
- F. A. Turner - Mustapha, A Tailor (*as Fred Turner)
- Virginia Lee Corbin - The Princess Badr al-Budur
- Alfred Paget - The Sultan
- Violet Radcliffe -al Talib, The Worker of Magic
- Buddy Messinger - Omar, Slave of the Magician and a Diviner of the Future
- Lewis Sargent - Ali, The Camel-Driver
- Gertrude Messinger - Yasmini, Sister of Ali and Hand Maiden to the Princess
- Marie Messinger - Dancing Girl
- Carmen De Rue - Dancing Girl
- Raymond Lee - Boy of the Street
- Lloyd Perl - Boy of the Street
- Joe Singleton - Muezzin
- Elmo Lincoln - The Genie
- Teddy Billings - Sullivan
