= Let Katie Do It =

1916 film

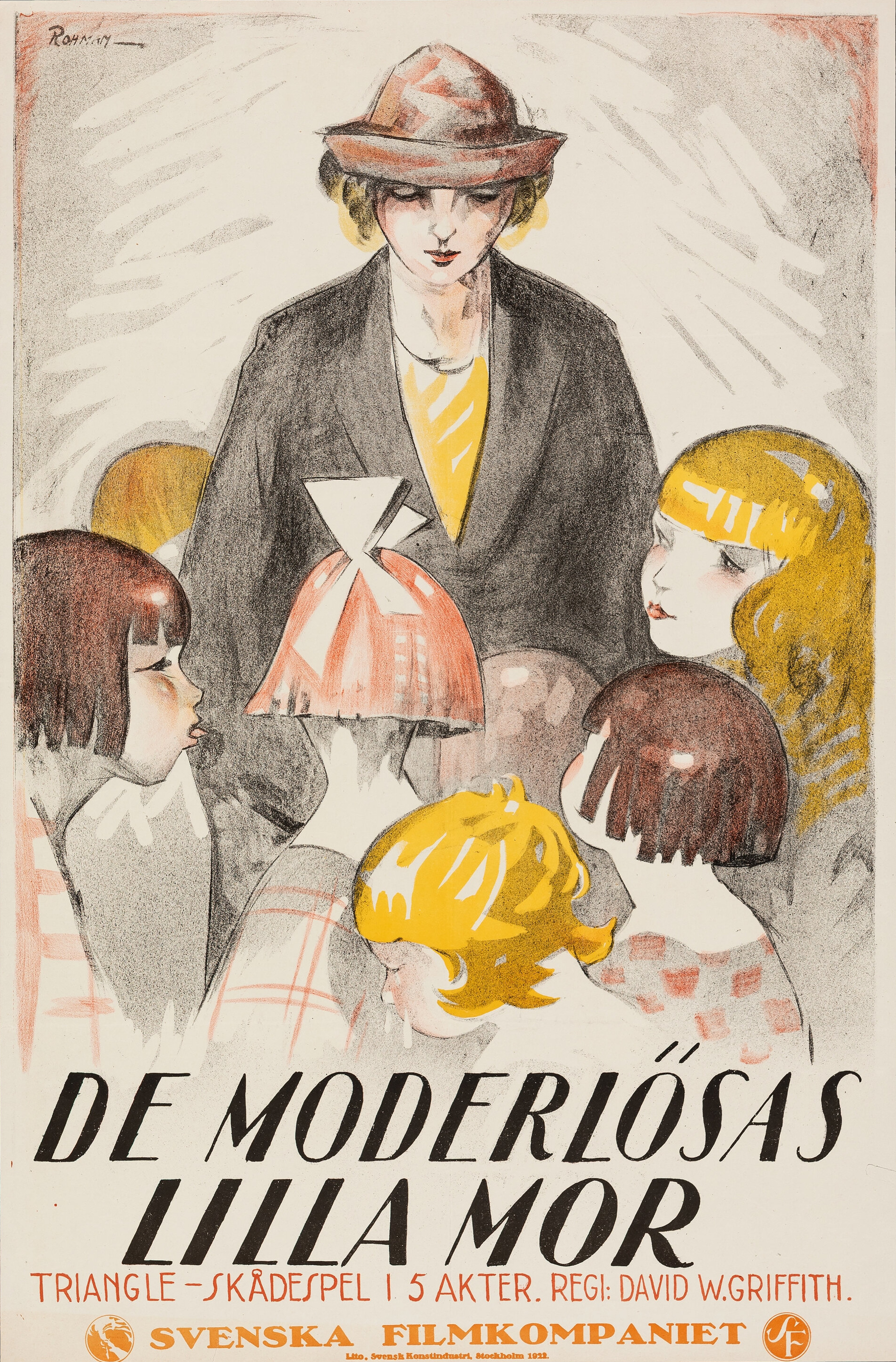
- Swedish theatrical release poster
- Directed by: Chester Franklin; Sidney Franklin; Millard Webb (assistant director)
- Written by: Granville Warwick (Griffith alias); Bernard McConville (scenario)
- Produced by: D. W. Griffith
- Starring: Jane Grey; Tully Marshall
- Cinematography: Frank B. Good
- Music by: William Furst
- Distributed by: Triangle Film Corporation
- Release date: January 6, 1916
- Running time: 50 minutes
- Country: United States
- Language: Silent with English titles

Let Katie Do It is a 1916 American silent film drama directed by Chester and Sidney Franklin and was produced by D. W. Griffith's Fine Arts company. It is also known as Let Katy Do It. A copy is preserved in the Library of Congress collection and UCLA Film & TV.

== Cast ==
- Jane Grey as Katie Standish
- Tully Marshall as Oliver Putnam
- Luray Huntley as Priscilla Standish (*Luray Huntley, wife of Walter Long)
- Charles West as Caleb Adams
- Ralph Lewis as Uncle Dan Standish
- George Pearce as Father Standish
- Walter Long as Pedro Garcia
- Charles Gorman as Carlos
- Violet Radcliffe as Adams' child
- Georgia Stone as Adams' child
- Carmen De Rue as Adams' child
- Francis Carpenter as Adams' child
- Ninon Fovieri as Adams' child
- Lloyd Pearl as Adams' child
- Beulah Burns as Adams' child

uncredited

- George Beranger as Accident witness
- Virginia Lee Corbin as Child
