= Ali Baba and the Forty Thieves (1918 film) =

1918 film

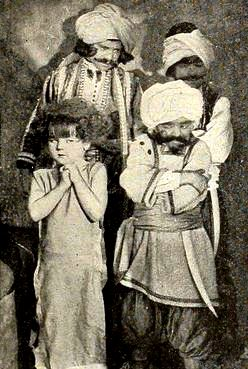
- Directed by: Chester M. Franklin; Sidney Franklin
- Written by: Bernard McConville
- Produced by: William Fox
- Starring: Georgie Stone; Gertrude Messinger; Lewis Sargent
- Cinematography: Henry W. Gerrard; Frank B. Good
- Production company: Fox Film
- Distributed by: Fox Film
- Release date: November 24, 1918
- Running time: 50 minutes
- Country: United States
- Languages: Silent; English intertitles

Ali Baba and the Forty Thieves is a 1918 American silent adventure film directed by Chester M. Franklin and Sidney Franklin and starring Georgie Stone, Gertrude Messinger and Lewis Sargent.

== Cast ==
- Georgie Stone as Ali Baba
- Gertrude Messinger as Morgiianna
- Lewis Sargent as Khaujeh Houssain
- Buddy Messinger as Kasim Bara
- G. Raymond Nye as Abdullah
- Raymond Lee as Also Talib
- Charles Hincus as Aasif Azaar
- Marie Messinger as Kasim's Servant
- Jack Hull as Jameel

== Bibliography ==
- Solomon, Aubrey. The Fox Film Corporation, 1915-1935: A History and Filmography. McFarland, 2011.
