= Heart o' the Hills =

1919 film

- DVD cover
- Directed by: Joseph De Grasse; Sidney Franklin
- Written by: Bernard McConville
- Based on: Heart o' the Hills by John Fox Jr.
- Produced by: Mary Pickford (executive producer)
- Starring: Mary Pickford
- Cinematography: Charles Rosher
- Production company: Mary Pickford Company
- Distributed by: First National
- Release date: November 30, 1919
- Running time: 87 minutes
- Country: United States
- Language: Silent (English intertitles)

Heart o' the Hills is a 1919 American silent drama film directed by Joseph De Grasse and Sidney Franklin, written by Bernard McConville based on John Fox Jr.'s novel of the same name.

== Plot ==
Jason Honeycutt is a young boy who lives with his stepfather chief Steve Honeycut at the ancestral Honeycutts' home. One day the chief is looking for the 13-year-old mountain girl Mavis Hawn, who is shooting bullets in the woods. Mavis desires revenge after a few gang members attacked her home and shot and killed her father. One of her only friends is geologist and school teacher John Burnham. He suggests she get an education instead of learning to use a gun.

Chief Honeycutt visits Mavis' widowed mother Martha Hawn and flirts with her. Meanwhile, Mavis is fishing at a pond near her home with Jason. He reveals his stepfather is manipulating Martha into granting him her land. When a group of planters and capitalists come to town intending to exploit mountain coal lands, Mavis scares them away with her gun. She and Jason later run into the rich aristocrat Gray Pendleton and his sweetheart Marjorie Lee, who are looking for the town.

Back at home, Mavis is disappointed Steve is still there. Later that night, Mavis visits a party and meets Gray for the second time. He flirts with her, which makes Jason jealous. Gray forces himself up to Mavis, which makes her upset and angry. She leaves the party and finds out her mother has left her to marry Steve. She decides to marry as well and proposes to Jason. However, they soon find out they are too young.

When word hits town that a man named Morton Sanders is planning to take over the city, some of the inhabitants, including Mavis, threaten him to force him go away. Later that night, Morton is found dead and the police are looking for everyone who was involved. The police visits the Hawn house, but Mavis' grandfather forces them to go away. While holding them off with his shotgun, Mavis packs her things and goes to hide in the forest. The next day, John Burnham visits her and convinces her to go to trial to prove her innocence.

In court, the lawyer of the other party demands for her to be hanged. The town folks try to defend her by all admitting they have shot Morton. Mavis is discharged and finally decides to go to school. Mr. Burnham, Gray and Marjorie are all pleased with Mavis' decision. Jason however, becomes jealous again when she starts hanging out with Gray at school and leaves her.

Six years pass. Mavis has been adopted by the rich Colonel Pendleton. One day she receives a letter from her mother, announcing she is getting old and will most likely die soon. She decides to visit her mother and finds out Steve killed her father. He has become violent and takes it out on Martha. Mavis tries to help her and shoots Steve. Martha survives the incident and takes Mavis in to live with her. Mavis is reunited with a grown-up Jason and they marry.

== Cast ==
- Mary Pickford - Mavis Hawn
- Harold Goodwin - Young Jason Honeycutt
- Allan Sears - Jason Honeycutt
- Fred Huntley - Granpap Jason Hawn
- Claire McDowell - Martha Hawn
- Sam De Grasse - Steve Honeycutt
- W.H. Bainbridge - Colonel Pendleton
- John Gilbert - Gray Pendleton
- Betty Bouton - Marjorie Lee
- Henry Hebert - Morton Sanders
- Fred Warren - John Burnham

== Critical assessment ==
In 1918, Pickford ended her five-year collaboration with Adolph Zukor and the Famous Players Film Company to form The Mary Pickford Company.

Among her first productions were Daddy-Long-Legs, The Hoodlum and The Heart o’ the Hills, all released in 1919. Biographer Jeanine Basinger considers these productions “some of the most successful films of Pickford’s career" and those in which the actress fully realizes her emerging screen persona.

== Sources ==
- Basinger, Jeanine. 1999. Silent Stars. Alfred A. Knopf, New York. ISBN 0-679-43840-8
