= Violet Radcliffe =

American actress

Violet Bonita Radcliffe
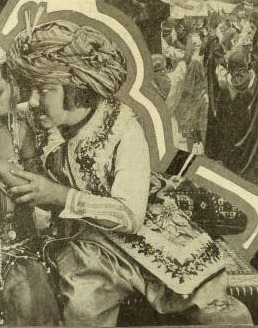
- Born: August 20, 1904; Niagara Falls, New York, United States
- Died: May 4, 1965 (aged 60); New York, United States
- Occupation: Child actress
- Years active: 1913–1918

Violet Bonita Radcliffe (20 August 1904, Niagara Falls - 4 May 1965, Los Angeles) was a child actress active during Hollywood's silent era. She appeared in several dozen films for Fine Arts, Fox, and Pathe, and was frequently cast as a villain or as a little boy. One of her best-known roles was as Dirty Face Dan in a number of serials.

== Biography ==
According to several US censuses, Violet Bonita Radcliffe was born August 20, 1904, in Niagara Falls, New York, to Harry Belmont Radcliffe and Ida F. Davenport. However, during her career she was said to be four years younger, resulting in an assumption she was born in 1908. She began performing when she was only two months old, and she was quite young when she appeared in her first film, 1913's Quo Vadis.

She played boys role in at least eighteen films between 1915 and 1917. She specialized in comedies and fairy tales in which all the actors were supposedly under the age of ten. She played a series of lovable villains for Majestic, including the character Dan in The Straw Man, Bilie's Goat, The Little Cupids and The Little Life Guard (1915). She then went to Fox role of Al-Talib in Aladdin and the Wonderful Lamp (1917) and Long John Silver in Treasure Island (1918).

She played Prince Rudolpho in Jack and the Beanstalk along Francis Carpenter, Virginia Lee Corbin and Carmen De Rue. She became regular with Carmen De Rue in the Fox Kiddie Features.

She left the movies in 1918, aged supposedly ten. Little was known of what became of her after her career in Hollywood ended, and she was assumed to have died in 1926, aged supposedly 18.

In 1922, she married Samuel Maddox, and in 1927, Archie Lee Sims, both in Los Angeles; in 1935, Eugene Woodford, in Vancouver, Washington; and in 1940, George O. Beiriger, in Las Vegas, Nevada. In 1950 she was an inmate in Stockton State Hospital, a mental institution. She died May 4, 1965, in Los Angeles, named Violet Bonita Beiringer.

== Selected filmography ==
- Treasure Island (1918)
- The Babes in the Woods (1917)
- Aladdin and the Wonderful Lamp (1917)
- Jack and the Beanstalk (1917)
- Cheerful Givers (1917)
- Everybody's Doing It (1916)
- A Sister of Six (1916)
- Gretchen the Greenhorn (1916)
- The Little School Ma'am (1916)
- Going Straight (1916)
- Let Katie Do It (1916)
- Quo Vadis? (1913)

== Bibliography ==
- Lussier, Tim (11 October 2018). "Bare Knees" Flapper: The Life and Films of Virginia Lee Corbin. McFarland Publishing. p. 218. ISBN 9781476675688.
