= Going Straight (1916 film) =

1916 film by Sidney Franklin, Chester M. Franklin, Millard Webb

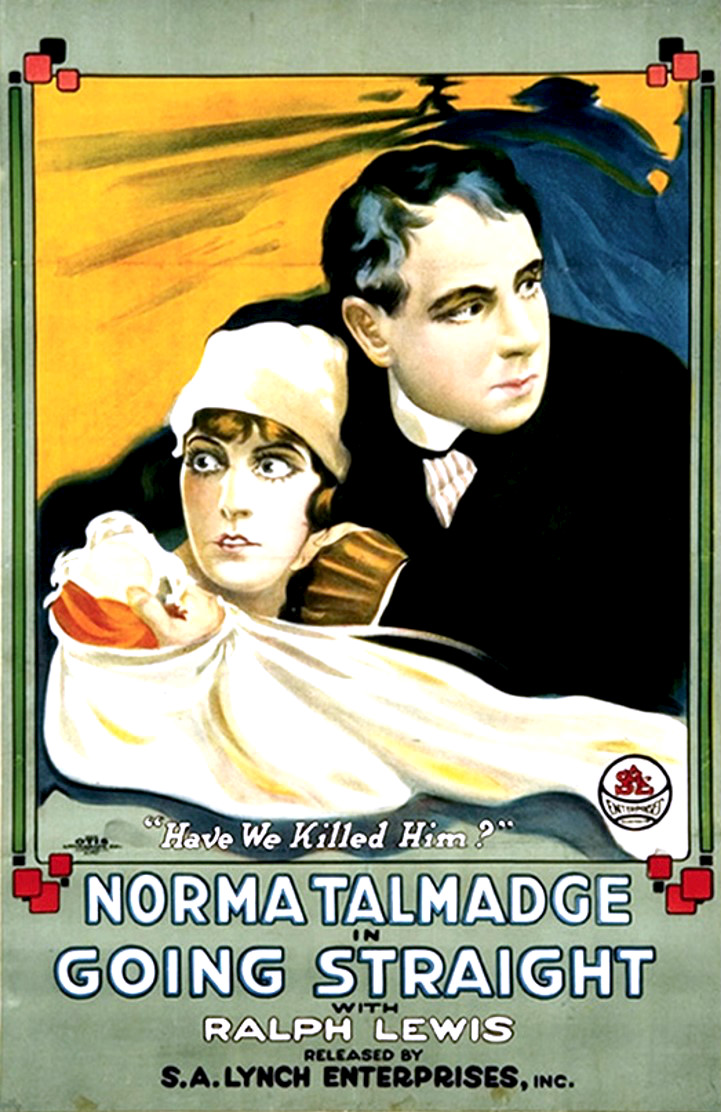
- Film poster
- Directed by: C.M. Franklin; S.A. Franklin
- Written by: Bernard McConville
- Starring: Norma Talmadge
- Cinematography: Frank B. Good
- Distributed by: Triangle Distributing Corporation
- Release date: June 4, 1916
- Running time: 60 minutes
- Country: United States
- Languages: Silent; English intertitles

Going Straight is a 1916 American silent crime drama film directed by C.M. Franklin and S.A. Franklin. The film stars Norma Talmadge and is one of the few films featuring her that still exists.

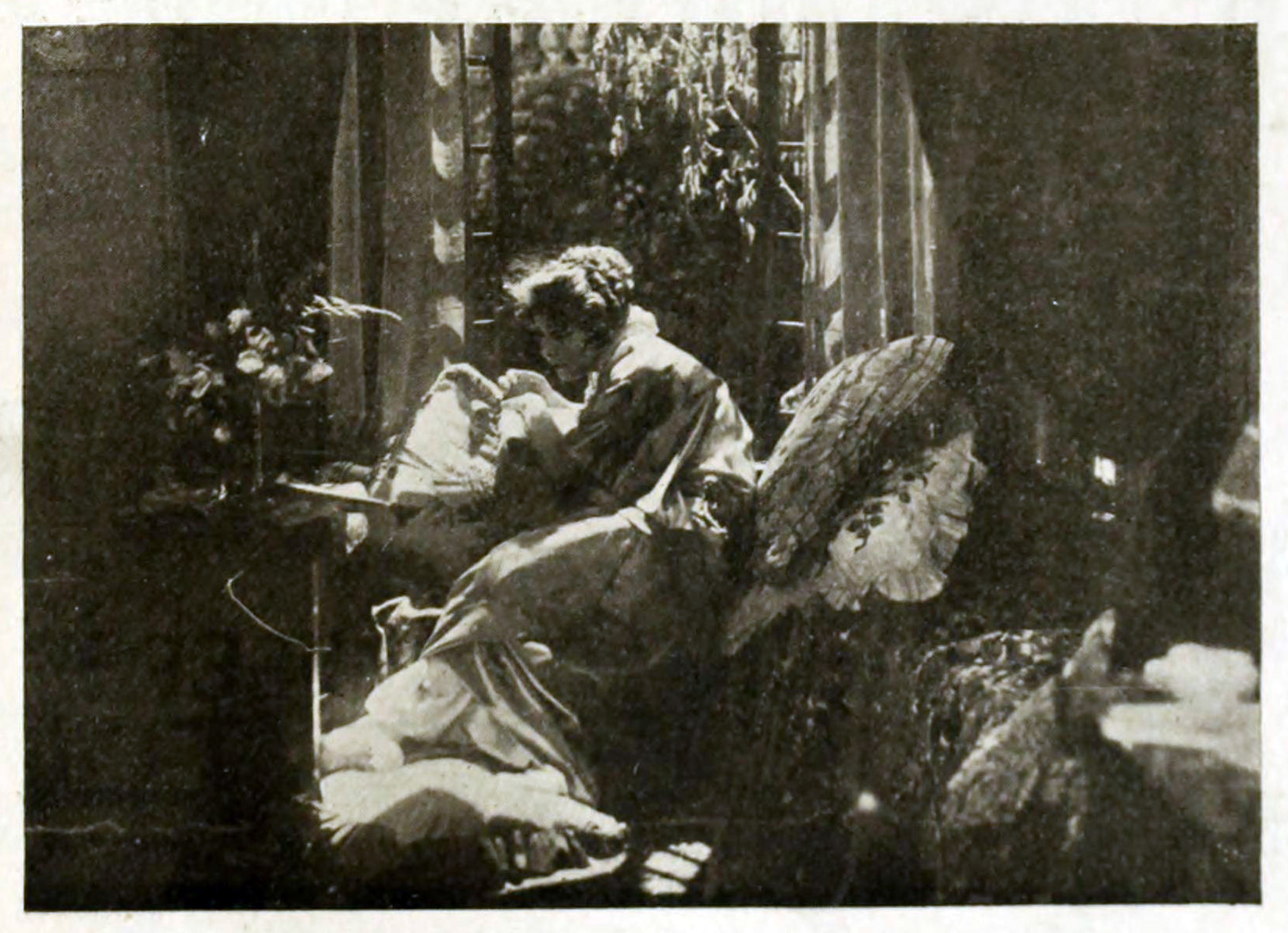
Cover photo from The Moving Picture World with a still from the film

== Plot ==
Well-to-do couple John and Grace Remington used to be leaders of the Higgins criminal gang, but have gone straight and are now respectable citizens. Their comfortable lives are disrupted when Dan Briggs, a petty street thief and member of their old gang, finds them. Briggs blackmails them by threatening to expose their past, wanting to make use of John Remington's former expertise as a safe cracker.

Remington reluctantly joins Briggs’ criminal enterprise, certain that it would be the one and only time that he returns to crime. However, the home they break into belongs to a friend of Grace's, and she and the Remington children are sleeping overnight there. The heist goes awry, and Briggs vows revenge on Remington.

== Cast ==
- Norma Talmadge – Grace Remington
- Ralph Lewis – John Remington
- Ninon Fovieri – The Remington's Child, son
- Francis Carpenter – The Remington's Child, son
- Fern Collier – The Remington's Child, daughter
- Ruth Handforth – Maid
- Eugene Pallette – Dan Briggs
- Georgie Stone – Jimmy (Dan's urchin sidekick)
- Kate Toncray – Mrs. Van Dyke
- 'Baby' Carmen De Rue – Mrs. Van Dyke's Child
- Violet Radcliffe – Mrs. Van Dyke's Child
