= You Never Can Tell =

You Never Can Tell may refer to:

- You Never Can Tell (play), an 1899 play by G. Bernard Shaw
- "You Never Can Tell" (song), a 1964 song by Chuck Berry
- You Never Can Tell (1920 film), a romantic comedy starring Jack Mulhall and Bebe Daniels
- You Never Can Tell (1951 film), a comedy starring Dick Powell
