= A Sister of Six =

A Sister of Six may refer to:

- A Sister of Six (1916 film), an American silent Western film
- A Sister of Six (1926 film), a silent romantic comedy film
