= Buddy Messinger =

American actor

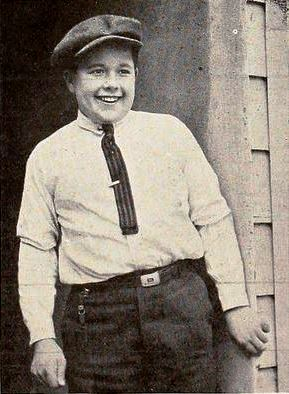
- Messinger in 1922
- Born: Melvin Joseph Messinger; October 26, 1907
- Died: October 25, 1965 (aged 57)
- Occupation: Actor
- Spouse(s): Marjorie Montgomery (m.1932—1965; his death)
- Relatives: Gertrude Messinger (sister)

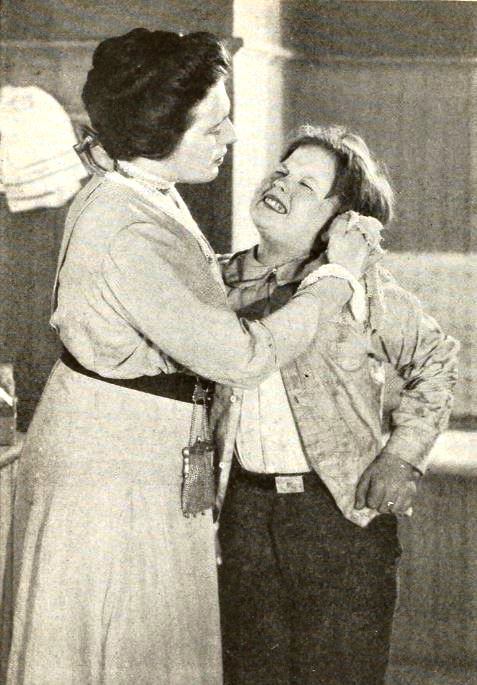
Still of Mary Alden and Messinger in The Old Nest (1921)

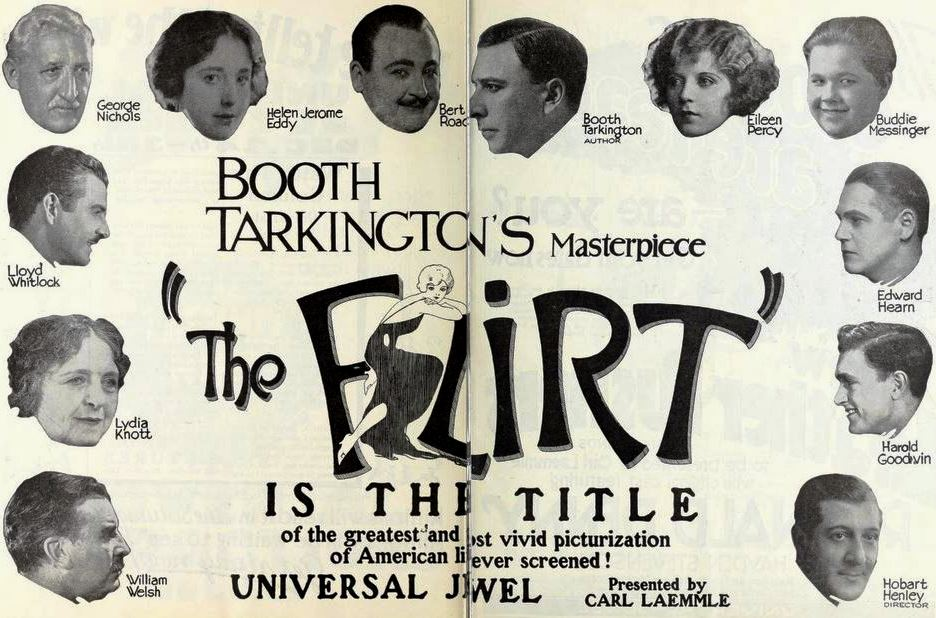
Advert for The Flirt (1922)

Buddy Messinger (born Melvin Joseph Messinger; 26 October 1907 – 25 October 1965) was an American actor who was cast in substantial roles in dozens of films during the silent film era. He began his career as a jovial chubby child actor. With the advent of sound films he was relegated mostly to bit parts.

His sister Gertrude Messinger was also a child actor. They appeared in several Fox fairytale movies for children. She transitioned to speaking roles in B-movies during the 1930s continuing her career into the 1950s.

He featured in a series of "Edgar" films including Edgar's Sunday Courtship, Edgar Camps Out, and Edgar's Little Saw in 1920 and 1921.

He appeared in a series of comedy films for Century Film Corporation. He starred in a 22-minute haunted house comedy for Universal called What an Eye in 1924 with Hilliard Karr.

In the 1950s and 1960s he also worked as an assistant director.

He married Marjorie Montgomery in 1932.

== Selected filmography ==
- Gloriana (1916) - Minor Role
- Jack and the Beanstalk (1917) - Minor Role
- Aladdin and the Wonderful Lamp (1917) - Omar - Al-talib's Evil Spirit
- The Babes in the Woods (1917)
- Treasure Island (1918) - Captain Smolett
- Six Shooter Andy (1918) - Susan's Brother (uncredited)
- Fan Fan (1918) - Head Collector
- Ali Baba and the Forty Thieves (1918) - Kasim Bara
- The Hoodlum (1919) - Dish Lowry
- Jinx (1919) - Orphan
- Luck of the Irish (1920)
- Edgar's Sunday Courtship (1920, Short) - Freddy Littlefield
- The Old Nest (1921) - Jim at 10
- Shadows (1922) - 'Mr. Bad Boy'
- When Love Comes (1922) - Coleridge Twin
- The Flirt (1922) - Hedrick Madison
- A Front Page Story (1922) - Tommy
- Boyhood Days (1923, Short)
- The Abysmal Brute (1923) - Buddy Sangster
- All Over Twist (1923)
- Trifling with Honkr (1923) - Jimmy Hunt
- Penrod and Sam (1923) - Rodney Bitts
- Don't Get Fresh (1923, Short)
- The Whispered Name (1924) - The Office Boy
- Young Ideas (1924) - Bob Lowden
- What an Eye (1924, a haunted house comedy for Universal Pictures) - Buddy - the Office Boy
- Don't Fall (1924, Short) - Buddy
- Jack and the Beanstalk (1924)
- Taming the East (1925, Short)
- Monkeys Prefer Blondes (1926, Short)
- Sorority Mixup (1927, Short)
- Swell Clothes (1927, Short) - Billy Fox
- Two Arabian Sites (1927, Short)
- Undressed (1928) - Bobby Arnold
- The Godless Girl (1928) - Student (uncredited)
- A Lady of Chance (1928) - Hank Crandall
- Hot Stuff (1929) - Tuffy
- Cheer Up and Smile (1930) - Donald
- The Age of Consent (1932) - Junior - A Student (uncredited)
- Bondage (1933) - (uncredited)
- Stage Mother (1933) - Fellow in Third Row (uncredited)
- Wild Boys of the Road (1933) - Boy (uncredited)
- College Coach (1933) - Newsboy (uncredited)
- This Side of Heaven (1934) - Fraternity Brother (uncredited)
- The Most Precious Thing in Life (1934) - Fraternity Boy (uncredited)
- Let 'Em Have It (1935) - Bellboy (uncredited)
- The Public Menace (1935) - Office Boy (uncredited)
- Thanks a Million (1935) - Elevator Operator (uncredited)
- Ah, Wilderness! (1935) - George Danforth (uncredited)
- Modern Times (1936) - Cigar Counterman (uncredited)
- The Three Wise Guys (1936) - Elevator Operator (uncredited)
- Three of a Kind (1936) - Bellhop (uncredited)
- Kelly the Second (1936) - Flynn Handler (uncredited)
- Our Relations (1936) - Pirate's Club Customer (uncredited)
- The Devil Is a Sissy (1936) - Elevator Operator (uncredited)
- Libeled Lady (1936) - Elevator Operator (uncredited)
- College Holiday (1936) - Dancer (uncredited)
- A Star Is Born (1937) - Boy Delivering Fan Mail (uncredited)
- Wings Over Honolulu (1937) - Boy (uncredited)
- Midnight Madonna (1937) - Messenger
- Super-Sleuth (1937) - Suspect #2 (uncredited)
- Blonde Trouble (1937) - Friend of Fred (uncredited)
- Atlantic Flight (1937) - Reporter in Control Room (uncredited)
- Test Pilot (1938) - Field Mechanic (uncredited)
- Hold That Kiss (1938) - Theatre Usher (uncredited)
- Yellow Jack (1938) - Saluting Patient (uncredited)
- The Shopworn Angel (1938) - Third Boy in Montage Yelling 'It's War!' (uncredited)
- Too Hot to Handle (1938) - Cycle Messenger (uncredited)
- The Shining Hour (1938) - Elevator Operator (uncredited)
- Four Girls in White (1939) - Messenger (uncredited)
- Idiot's Delight (1939) - Usher (uncredited)
- Fast and Loose (1939) - Clerk (uncredited)
- The Lone Ranger Rides Again (1939, Serial) - Rance (uncredited)
- Sergeant Madden (1939) - Hospital Clerk (uncredited)
- Fast and Furious (1939) - First Elevator Boy (uncredited)
- The Housekeeper's Daughter (1939) - Newspaper Reporter (uncredited)
- Turnabout (1940) - Elevator Boy (uncredited)
- Andy Hardy Meets Debutante (1940) - Elevator Boy (uncredited)
- Hullabaloo (1940) - Third Page (uncredited)
- Love Thy Neighbor (1940) - Elevator Boy (uncredited)
- Keeping Company (1940) - Basketball Ticket Boy (uncredited)
- Citizen Kane (1941) - Man at Boat Dock (uncredited)
- The Big Store (1941) - Elevator Operator (uncredited)
- Hold Back the Dawn (1941) - Hospital Elevator Operator (uncredited)
- The Mexican Spitfire's Baby (1941) - Reporter (uncredited)
- Brooklyn Orchid (1942) - Bellhop with Flowers (uncredited)
- The Affairs of Martha (1942) - Butcher Boy (uncredited)
- The Gay Sisters (1942) - Courtroom Spectator (uncredited)
- Henry Aldrich Gets Glamour (1943) - Fred - Soda Jerk (uncredited)
- The Story of Dr. Wassell (1944) - U.S. Sailor (uncredited)
- Crime by Night (1944) - Bellboy (uncredited)
- Devil's Doorway (1950) - Barfly (uncredited) (final film role)
