= Treasure Island (1918 film) =

1918 film by Sidney Franklin, Chester M. Franklin

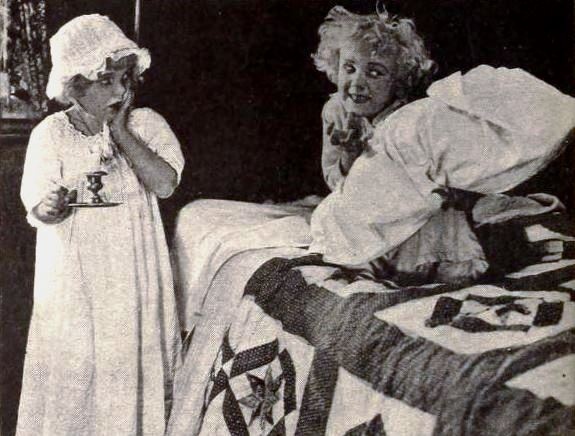
- Still with Virginia Lee Corbin and Francis Carpenter
- Directed by: Chester Franklin; Sidney Franklin
- Written by: Bernard McConville (scenario)
- Based on: Treasure Island; 1883 novel by Robert Louis Stevenson
- Produced by: William Fox
- Starring: Francis Carpenter; Virginia Lee Corbin
- Cinematography: Frank Good; Harry Gerstad
- Production company: Fox Film
- Release date: January 27, 1918
- Running time: 6 reels
- Country: United States
- Language: Silent (English intertitles)

Treasure Island is a 1918 American silent adventure film based on the 1883 novel of the same name by Robert Louis Stevenson. This is one of many silent versions of the story and is noteworthy because it is almost entirely acted by child or teenage actors. The film was co-directed by brothers Sidney and Chester Franklin. The film is one of Fox's Sunset Kiddies productions following in the wake of previous Kiddie productions like Aladdin and his Wonderful Lamp. This is a lost film.

== Plot ==
As described in a film magazine, Jim Hawkins and his mother operate the Admiral Ben Bow Inn, and when they are threatened by an attack by pirates they go to the home of their friend, the squire, for the night. Mrs. Hawkins hands the squire a package she found in a chest that was owned by Billy Bones, one of her boarders who had died. The squire discovers a map showing the location of treasure buried by someone named Flint. Jim, overhearing the squire's plans to recover the treasure, goes to sleep and dreams that he, Louise, and a ship's crew have set out to find the gold. Long John Silver, their first mate, is a crook and with some of the men plan to rob Jim and Louise of the treasure. After a fight on the island and the killing off of Long John Silver's men, Long John Silver joins Jim and his gang and through Ben Gunn they find the treasure. Just as Jim is about to distribute it, he wakes up.

== Cast ==
- Francis Carpenter as Jim Hawkins
- Virginia Lee Corbin as Louise Trelawney
- Violet Radcliffe as Long John Silver
- Lloyd Perl as Black Dog
- Lew Sargent as Ben Gunn
- Buddy Messinger as Captain Smollett
- Gertrude Messinger
- Eleanor Washington as Jim's mother
- Herschell Mayal as Captain Bill Bones (prologue)
- Elmo Lincoln as Long John Silver (prologue)
- Charles Gorman as Black Dog (prologue)
- Ed Harley (Edwin Harley) as Blind Pew (prologue)
