= A Private Scandal =

1921 film

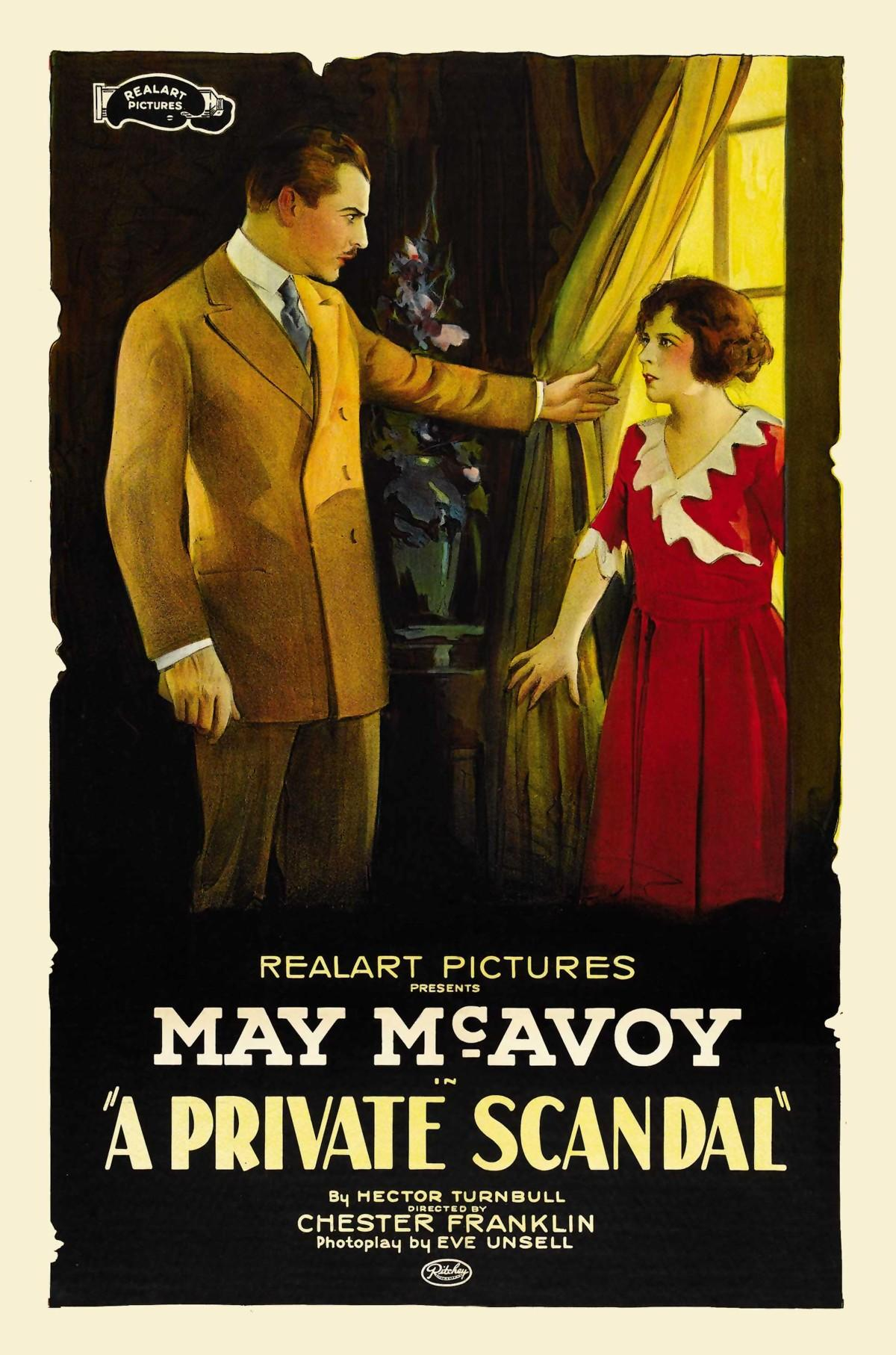
- Theatrical release poster
- Directed by: Chester M. Franklin
- Screenplay by: Eve Unsell
- Story by: Hector Turnbull
- Starring: May McAvoy; Bruce Gordon; Ralph Lewis; Kathlyn Williams; Lloyd Whitlock; Gladys Fox
- Cinematography: J.O. Taylor
- Production company: Realart Pictures Corporation
- Distributed by: Realart Pictures Corporation
- Release date: June 12, 1921
- Running time: 50 minutes
- Country: United States
- Language: Silent (English intertitles)

A Private Scandal is a 1921 American drama film directed by Chester M. Franklin and written by Eve Unsell. The film stars May McAvoy, Bruce Gordon, Ralph Lewis, Kathlyn Williams, Lloyd Whitlock, and Gladys Fox. The film was released on June 12, 1921, by Realart Pictures Corporation.

== Cast ==
- May McAvoy as Jeanne Millett
- Bruce Gordon as Jerry Hayes
- Ralph Lewis as Phillip Lawton
- Kathlyn Williams as Carol Lawton
- Lloyd Whitlock as Alec Crosby
- Gladys Fox as Betty Lawton
