= A Sister of Six (1916 film) =

1916 film

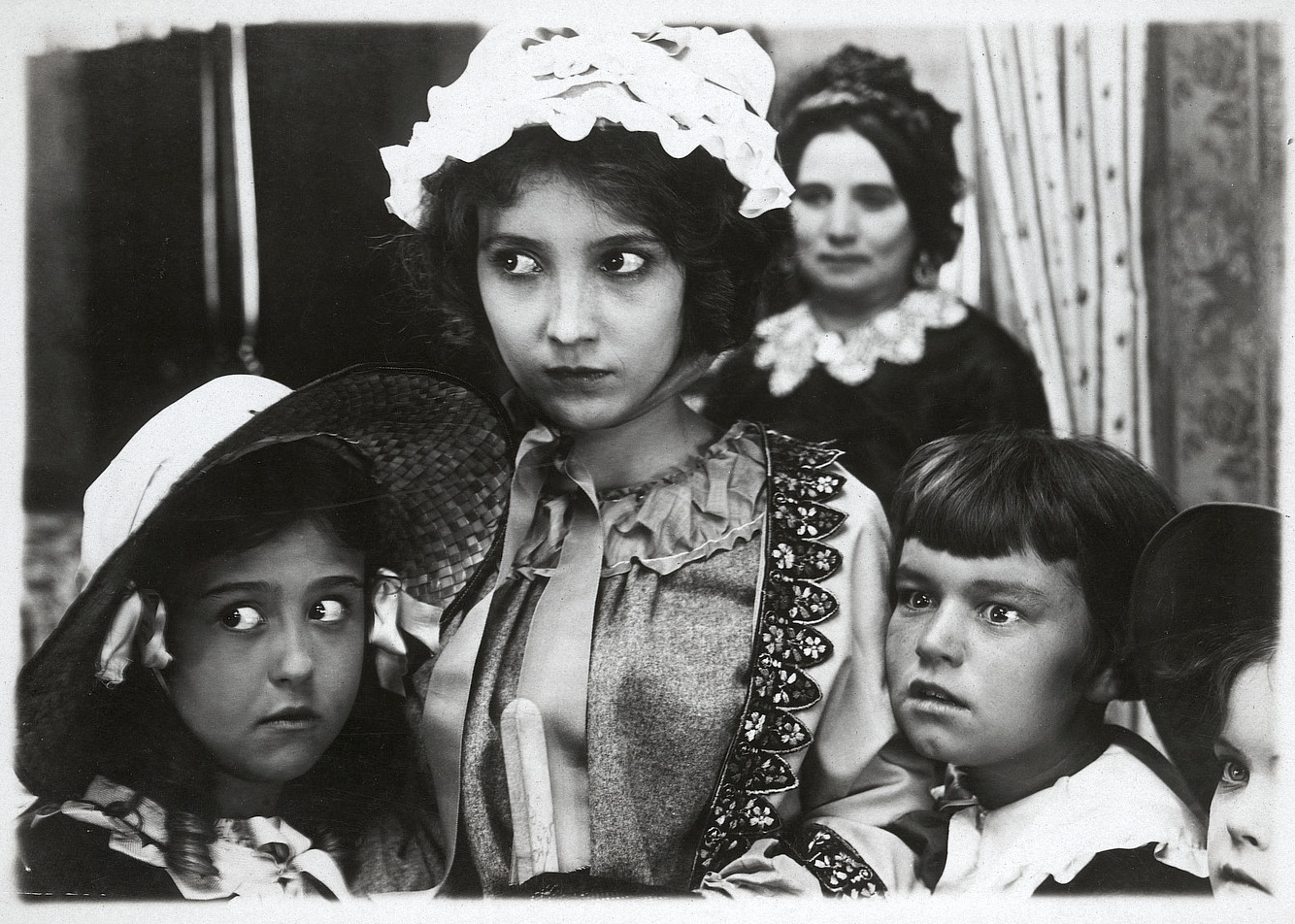
- Publicity still
- Directed by: Chester M. Franklin; Sidney Franklin
- Written by: Bernard McConville
- Produced by: Fine Arts Film Company
- Starring: Bessie Love
- Cinematography: David Abel
- Distributed by: Triangle Film Corporation
- Release date: October 29, 1916 (US)
- Running time: 5 reels
- Country: United States
- Language: Silent (English intertitles)

A Sister of Six is a 1916 American silent Western film produced by the Fine Arts Film Company and distributed by Triangle Film Corporation. The film was directed by brothers Chester M. and Sidney Franklin. It was Bessie Love's first starring role.

Home-movie condensation of A Sister of Six with German titles.

The film is considered lost, with only a fragment surviving.

== Production ==
The hacienda set was built on the Lasky Ranch.

Rehearsals for the film commenced on August 4, 1916.

== Plot ==
In 1860, Prudence (Love) and her six siblings are orphaned when their father is killed by bandits. Prudence becomes a surrogate mother to them, and moves the family from Southern California to New England to live with an old sailor uncle. When they learn that gold was discovered on their land in California, they return to reclaim it, fighting the bandits who have taken over their property.

== Cast ==
- Ben Lewis as Amos Winthrop
- Bessie Love as Prudence
- Georgie Stone as Jonathan
- Violet Radcliffe as Eli
- Carmen De Rue as Priscilla
- Francis Carpenter as Benjamin
- Beulah Burns as Abigail
- Lloyd Perl as Allan
- Ralph Lewis as Caleb Winthrop
- Frank Bennett as Joaquin Sepulveda
- Allan Sears as Don Francisco Garcia
- Charles Gorman as John Longstreet
- Charles Stephens as Diego
- Alberta Lee as Miss Ruth

== Release and reception ==
On its release, A Sister of Six was shown with a Mack Sennett/Keystone comedy.

The film received generally positive reviews. The performances, particularly those of the child actors, were praised. Despite positive reviews for Love's performance, it was noted that she was not yet a major box-office draw.
