= The Bridge of Sighs (1925 film) =

1925 film

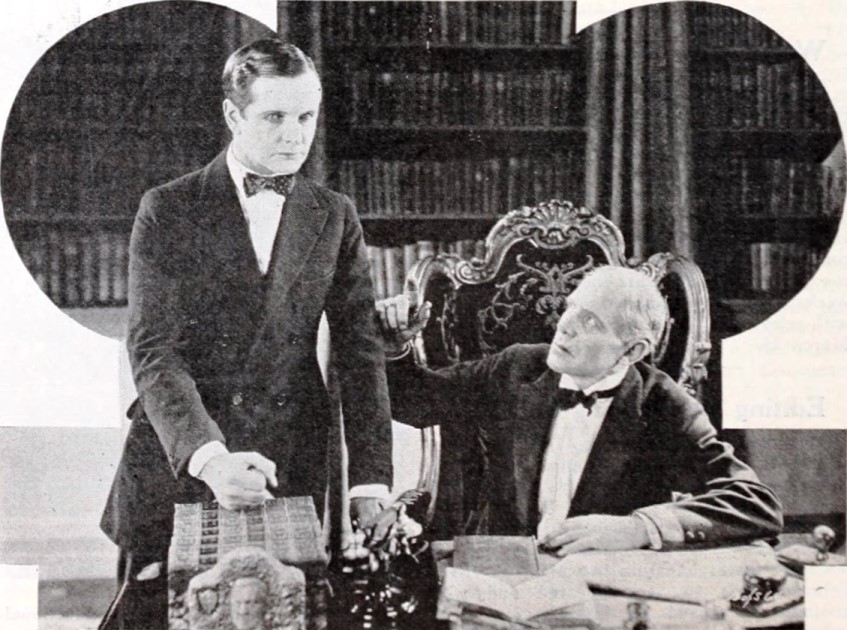
- Still with Hale and Lewis
- Directed by: Phil Rosen
- Screenplay by: Louis D. Lighton; Hope Loring
- Story by: Charles K. Harris
- Starring: Dorothy Mackaill; Creighton Hale; Richard Tucker; Alec B. Francis; Ralph Lewis; Cliff Saum
- Cinematography: John J. Mescall
- Production company: Warner Bros.
- Distributed by: Warner Bros.
- Release date: January 1, 1925
- Running time: 70 minutes
- Country: United States
- Language: Silent (English intertitles)

The Bridge of Sighs is a 1925 American silent drama film directed by Phil Rosen and written by Louis D. Lighton and Hope Loring. The film stars Dorothy Mackaill, Creighton Hale, Richard Tucker, Alec B. Francis, Ralph Lewis, and Cliff Saum. The film was released by Warner Bros. on January 1, 1925.

== Plot ==
As described in a film magazine review, Billy, the son of William Craig, rushes to the rescue of Linda Harper when she is almost hit by a taxi. He finds out that she is the daughter of an old employee of his father. Billy wins her friendship and love. When Billy's father refuses to give him more money to spend, he thinks it is a great joke to take it from a pile on his father's desk. John Harper is accused of stealing the money and is sent to prison. Billy confesses his guilt, but his father has him shanghaied to prevent any shame to his mother. Billy returns to find his mother dead and Harper at home ill after serving his prison sentence. Harper's only request is that the truth be kept from Linda. Linda is on her way to see Glenn Hayden in a desperate attempt to borrow money for her father. Billy rescues her from a man's attentions and they decide to get married immediately.

== Cast ==
- Dorothy Mackaill as Linda Harper
- Creighton Hale as Billy Craig
- Richard Tucker as Glenn Hayden
- Alec B. Francis as John Harper
- Ralph Lewis as William Craig
- Cliff Saum as Smithers
- Fanny Midgley as Mrs. William Craig
- Aileen Manning as Mrs. Smithers

== Preservation status ==
An incomplete print of The Bridge of Sighs survives in the French archive Centre national du cinéma et de l'image animée in Fort de Bois-d'Arcy.
