= Broad Daylight (film) =

1922 film by Irving Cummings

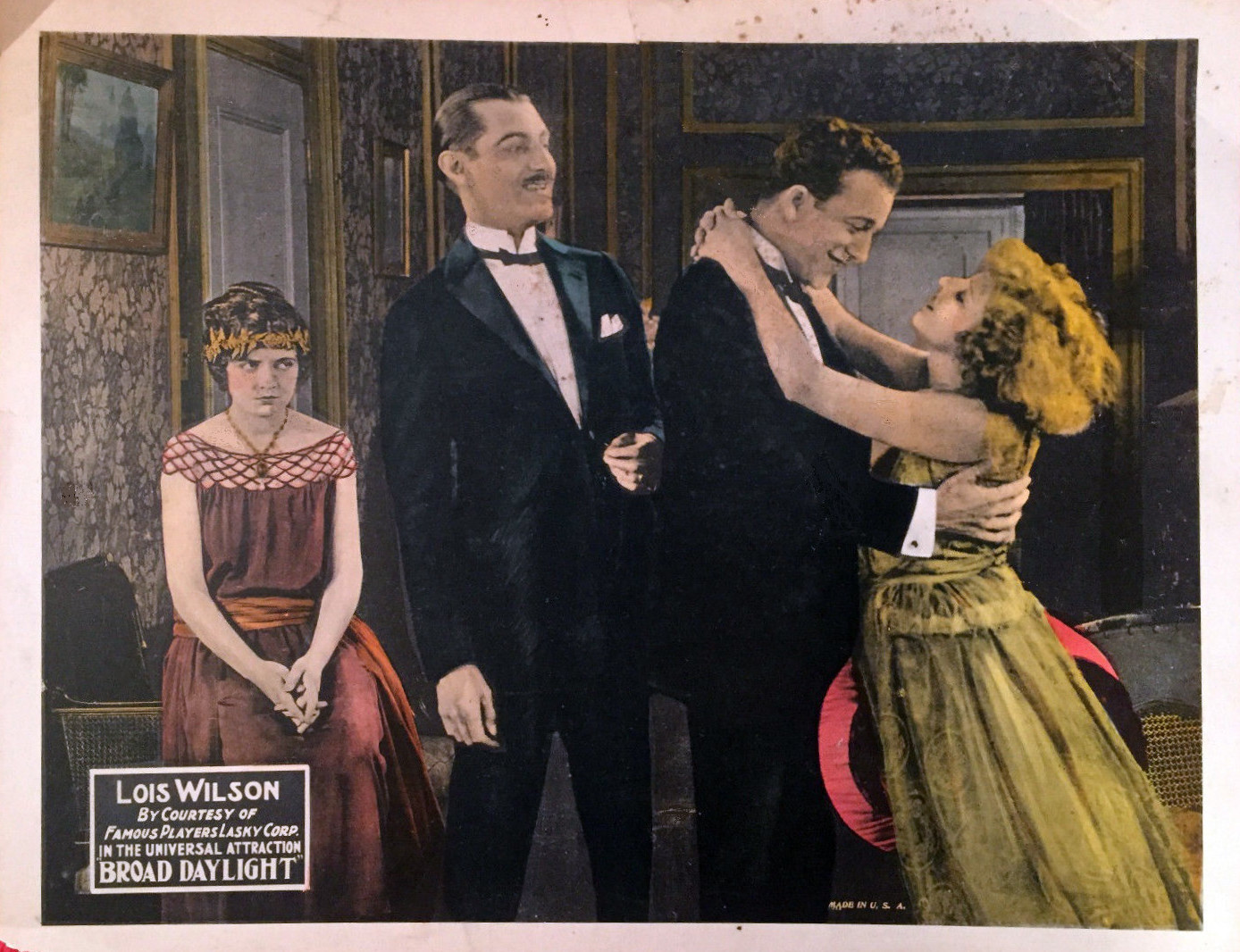
- Lobby card
- Directed by: Irving Cummings
- Screenplay by: Harvey Gates
- Story by: Harvey Gates; George W. Pyper
- Starring: Lois Wilson; Jack Mulhall; Ralph Lewis; Kenneth Gibson; Wilton Taylor; Ben Hewlett
- Cinematography: William Fildew
- Production company: Universal Film Manufacturing Company
- Distributed by: Universal Film Manufacturing Company
- Release date: October 30, 1922
- Running time: 50 minutes
- Country: United States
- Language: Silent (English intertitles)

Broad Daylight is a 1922 American silent crime film directed by Irving Cummings and written by Harvey Gates. The film stars Lois Wilson, Jack Mulhall, Ralph Lewis, Kenneth Gibson, Wilton Taylor, and Ben Hewlett. The film was released on October 30, 1922, by Universal Film Manufacturing Company.

== Plot ==
As described in a film magazine, Peter Fay, in prison nearing the end of a long sentence for a swindle, hoped his daughter Nora was on the clean, straight path and not the one he had followed. She was hoping for the best turn in her father's character so that he might come out purged of dishonesty. The police, old "friends" of Peter, watched his daughter to check her mode of living. At a drunken party, crooks who had something on Nora compel her to marry a drunken man thought to be a millionaire politician's son, using the bait that she could live off whatever the father thought it might be worth to keep this quiet until after the election. The wedding in the basement was simple, with a scared minister to perform it, a drunken groom, and as witnesses three crooks, Davy Sunday, Shadow Smith, and The Scarab. They adjourned from the wedding on a hint that the police were en route to raid the party upstairs. The crooks then find out that the man was not the millionaire's son but Joel Morgan, a friend of that son, so the gang attempt to kill him and throw him in a roadside ditch, but Nora nurses the handsome Joel back to health at her tiny apartment. Joel comes to see that Nora may be "n.g." and possibly a crook, so he leaves her. Two years later Nora, trying to keep her father, now released from prison, from breaking into a house and robbing its safe. There is a fight at the house between the father and the gang, leaving one dead, and then the owner of the house catches them all. It turns out to be Joel, the owner of the house who has cleaned up his life. In spite of the evidence against her, Joel protects Nora and uses this opportunity granted by fate to reunite with her.

== Cast ==
- Lois Wilson as Nora Fay
- Jack Mulhall as Joel Morgan
- Ralph Lewis as Peter Fay
- Kenneth Gibson as Davy Sunday
- Wilton Taylor as Detective Marks
- Ben Hewlett as Shadow Smith
- Robert Walker as The Scarab

== Preservation ==
No copies of Broad Daylight are listed as held by any film archives, so it is a lost film.
