= Cheerful Givers =

1917 silent film by Paul Powell

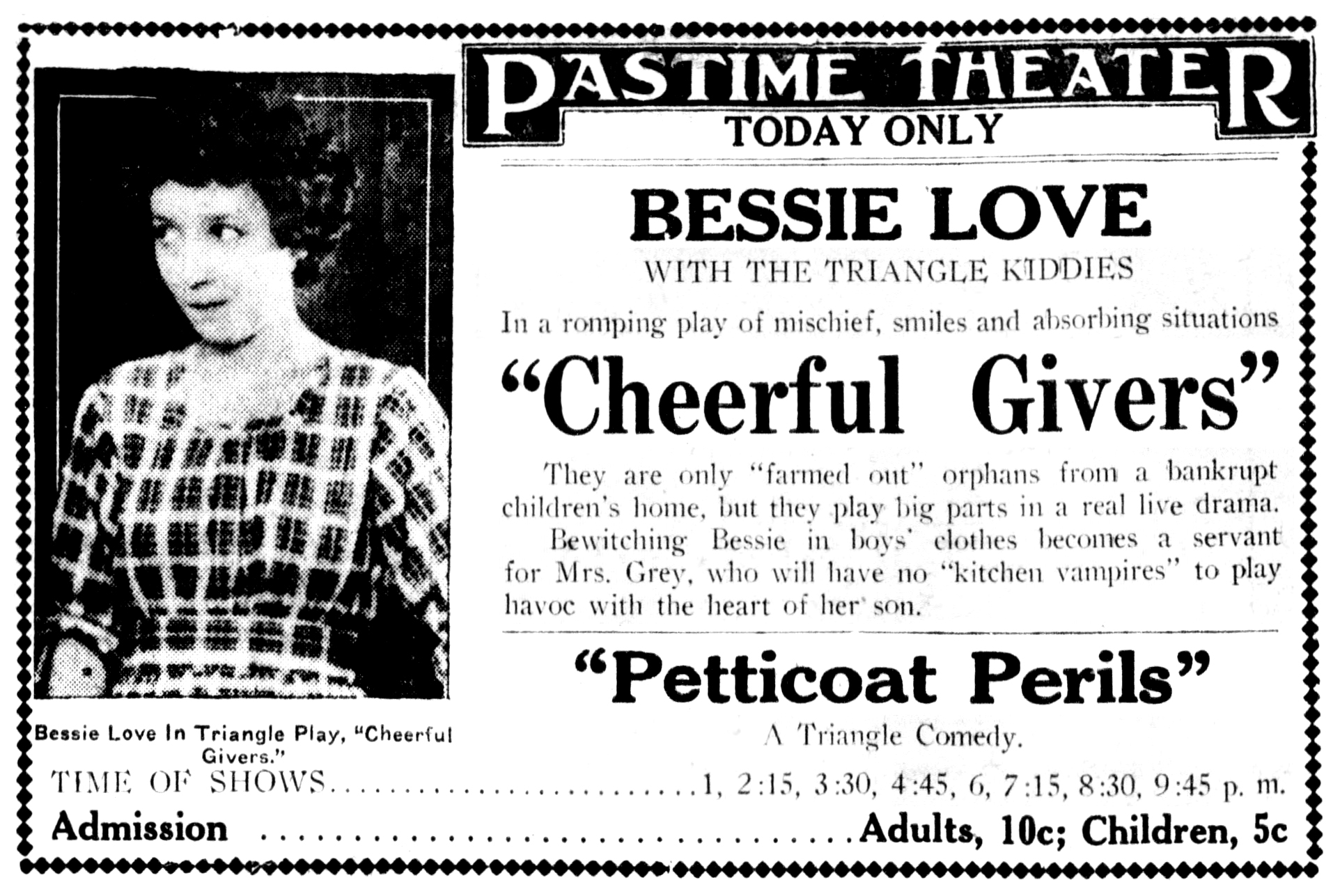
- Newspaper advertisement
- Directed by: Paul Powell
- Written by: Mary H. O'Connor
- Starring: Bessie Love; Kenneth Harlan
- Cinematography: John W. Leezer
- Production company: Fine Arts Film Company
- Distributed by: Triangle Film Corporation
- Release date: April 15, 1917 (U.S.)
- Running time: 5 reels
- Country: United States
- Language: Silent (English intertitles)

Cheerful Givers is a 1917 American silent comedy-drama film produced by the Fine Arts Film Company and distributed by Triangle Film Corporation. The film stars Bessie Love and Kenneth Harlan.

The film is presumed lost.

== Plot ==
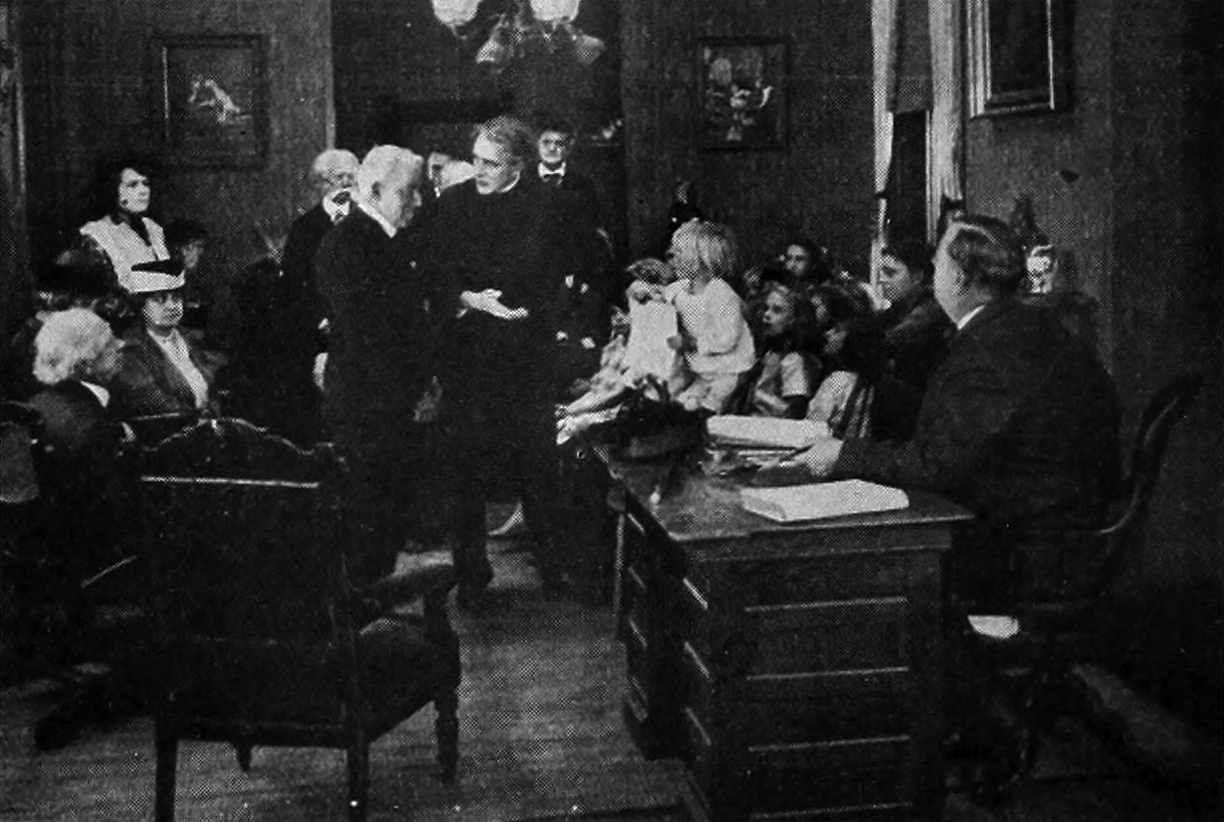
Scene featuring Spottiswoode Aitken

To save her father's orphanage, Judy (Love) answers a request to have the "eldest boy" work in the kitchen of a wealthy, miserly woman. Disguising herself as a boy, she encounters the woman's son, Horace (Harlan), whom she mistrusts. Horace realizes Judy is actually a girl and falls in love with her. Judy ultimately thwarts his plan to steal from his mother's safe. The son repents, and Judy reciprocates his feelings.

== Cast ==
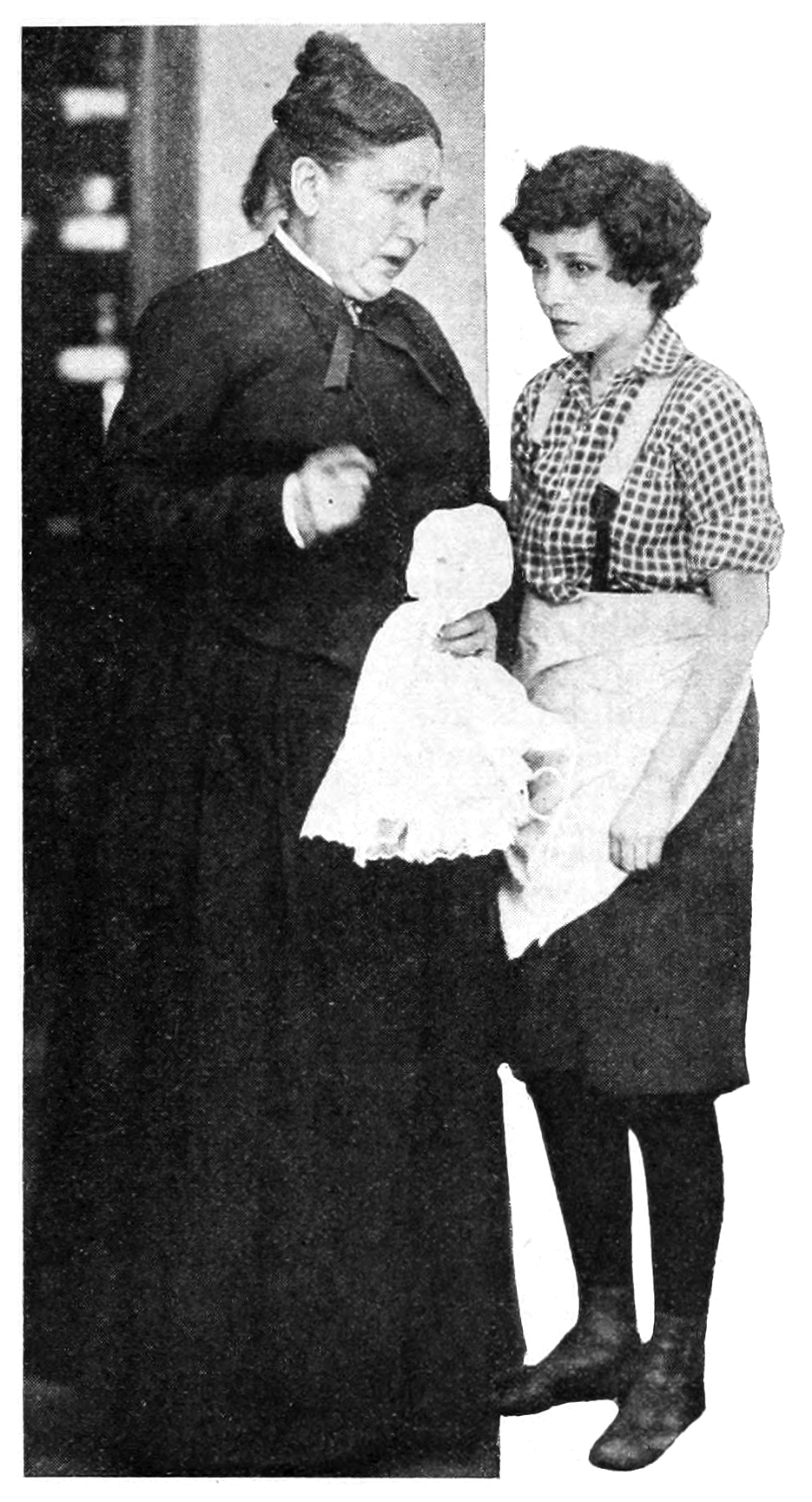
Josephine Crowell and Bessie Love

- Bessie Love as Judy
- Kenneth Harlan as Horace Gray
- Josephine Crowell as Mrs. Harriet Gray
- Spottiswoode Aitken as Reverend John Deady
- Bessie Buskirk as Lizzie Vance
- Pauline Starke as Abigail Deady
- Winifred Westover as Estella
- Loyola O'Connor as Mrs. Parker
- William H. Brown as Bob, Factotum of Orphanage
- Violet Radcliffe as Orphan
- Beulah Burns as Orphan
- George Stone as Orphan
- 'Baby' Carmen De Rue as Orphan
- Francis Carpenter as Orphan
- Ninon Fovieri as Orphan
- Lloyd Perl as Orphan
- Violet Wilkey as Oldest Orphan Girl (uncredited)

== Reception ==
The film received generally positive reviews, being described as an "adroit comedy" and "perfectly done". It was noted for its broad appeal. However, some reviewers found the pacing too slow.

Bessie Love's performance was generally praised, although it was noted that she had not yet become a major box office draw nationwide.
