= Everybody's Doing It (1916 film) =

1916 film

- Directed by: Tod Browning
- Starring: Howard Gaye; Tully Marshall
- Release date: 1916
- Running time: 2 reels
- Country: United States
- Languages: Silent; English intertitles

Everybody's Doing It was a 1916 American short comedy film directed by Tod Browning. There is no official documentation confirming that a film with this title was released or even produced; the film was most likely never completed, or was completed but never publicly released.

== Cast ==
- Howard Gaye as Society gentleman
- Tully Marshall as Crook
- Violet Radcliffe
- Georgie Stone
- Lilian Webster as Young woman
