= Jack and the Beanstalk (1917 film) =

1917 film by Chester M. Franklin

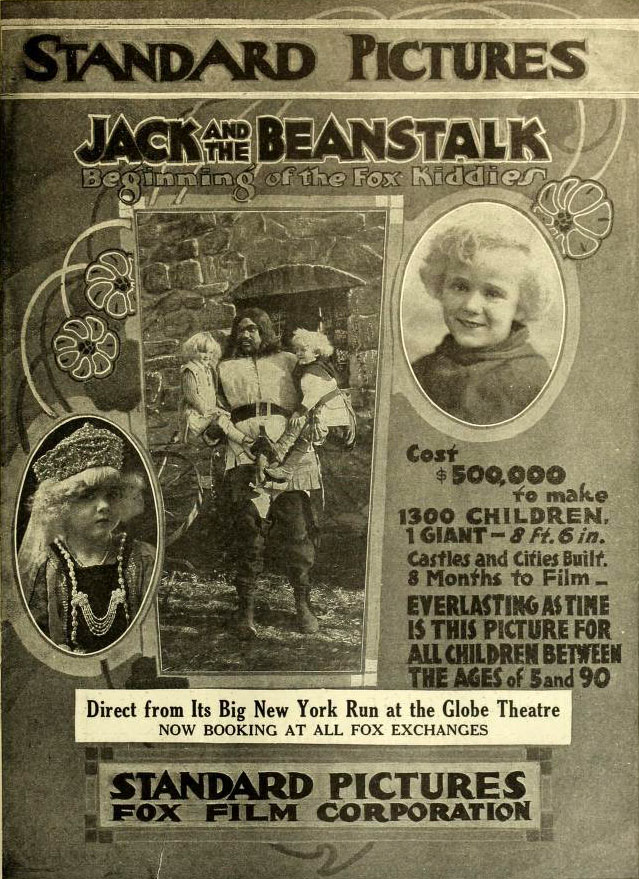
- Directed by: Chester Franklin; Sidney Franklin
- Written by: Chester M. Franklin; Sidney Franklin; Mary Murillo
- Based on: Jack and the Beanstalk
- Produced by: William Fox
- Starring: Francis Carpenter; Virginia Lee Corbin; Violet Radcliffe
- Cinematography: Harry W. Gerstad; Frank B. Good; Walter Williams
- Production company: Fox Film
- Distributed by: Fox Film
- Release date: July 30, 1917
- Running time: 100 minutes
- Country: United States
- Language: Silent (English intertitles)

Jack and the Beanstalk is a 1917 American silent fantasy film directed by Chester Franklin and Sidney Franklin and starring Francis Carpenter, Virginia Lee Corbin, and Violet Radcliffe. It is based on the fairytale of the same name.

== Plot summary ==
Jack exchanges his cow for some magic beans. The beans grow overnight into a beanstalk. Jack climbs it and arrives at a castle that is his. He sets a deal with the giant in exchange for the fortune.

== Main cast ==
- Francis Carpenter as Francis / Jack
- Virginia Lee Corbin as Virginia / Princess Regina
- Violet Radcliffe as Prince Rudolpho
- Carmen De Rue as The King of Cornwall
- Jim G. Tarver as Giant
- Vera Lewis as The Giantess
- Ralph Lewis as Francis' Father
- Eleanor Washington as Francis' Mother
- Ione Glennon as Virginia's Mother

== Preservation ==
An incomplete 16mm print consisting of 14 minutes is held by George Eastman House.

== Bibliography ==
- Solomon, Aubrey. The Fox Film Corporation, 1915-1935: A History and Filmography. McFarland, 2011.
