= The Earl of Chicago =

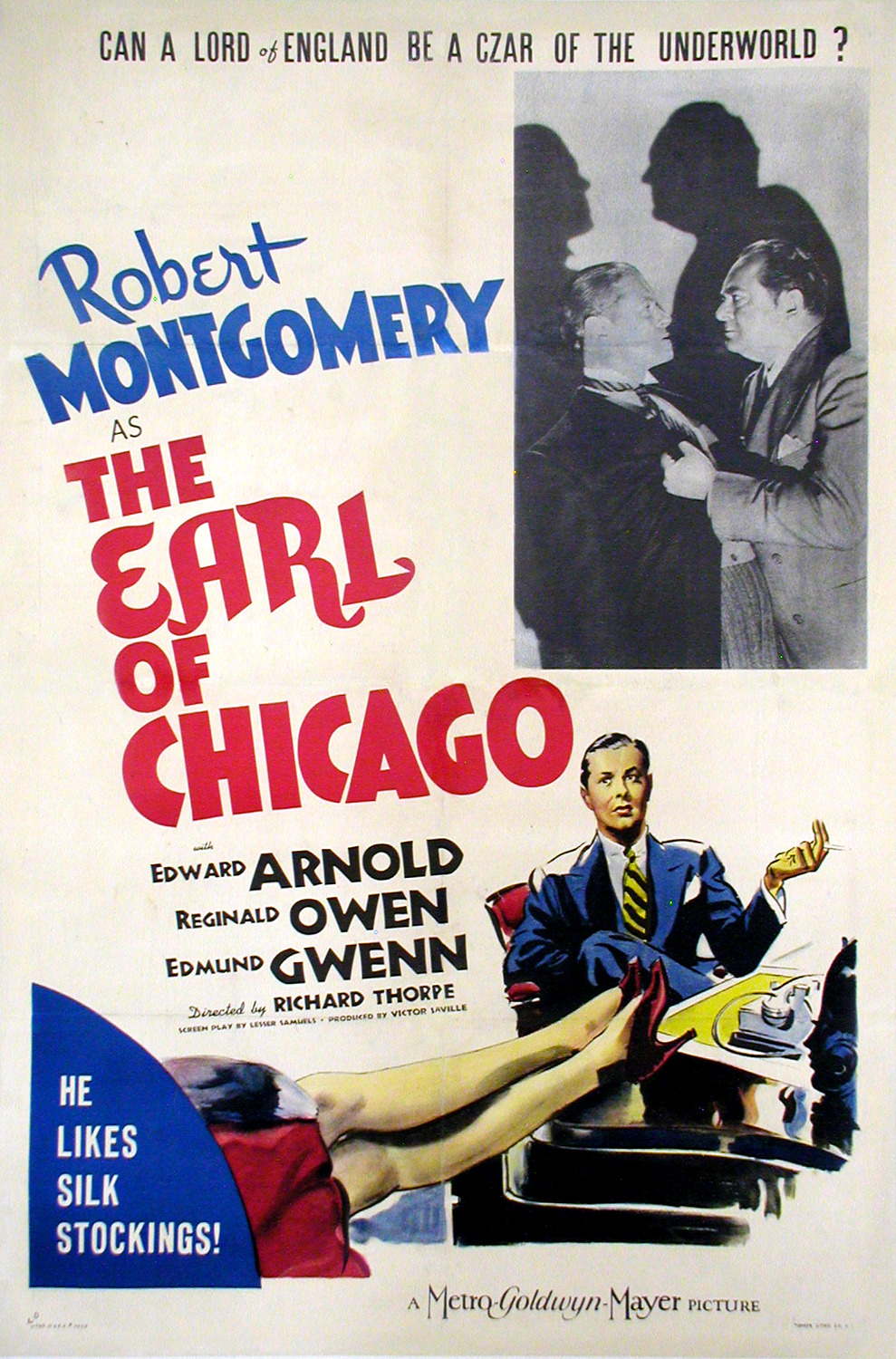
- Directed by: Richard Thorpe
- Written by: Lesser Samuels
- Produced by: Victor Saville
- Starring: Robert Montgomery, Edward Arnold, Reginald Owen
- Cinematography: Ray June
- Edited by: Frank Sullivan
- Music by: Werner R. Heymann
- Production company: Metro-Goldwyn-Mayer
- Distributed by: Loew's Inc.
- Release date: January 5, 1940
- Running time: 87 minutes
- Country: United States
- Language: English

The Earl of Chicago is a 1940 American drama film directed by Richard Thorpe and starring Robert Montgomery, Edward Arnold, Reginald Owen and Edmund Gwenn. Made during 1939 and released in January 1940, it was the first MGM film of the 1940s.

== Plot ==
Robert "Silky" Kilmount, an ex-Chicago bootlegger, has opened up a legal distillery with the end of Prohibition. To remedy the ill doings of his past, he hires Quentin "Doc" Ramsey as manager of his company. Seven years ago, Silky got Doc sent to prison after framing him for a crime he didn't commit.

Feigning gratitude, Doc instead harbors evil intentions, and just waits for an opportunity to take revenge. This appears with English attorney Gervase Gonwell, who arrives to tell Silky that he has inherited land from his deceased uncle, the Earl of Gorley.

Doc persuades Silky to go to England and visit his new estate. Clueless of Doc's true feelings, Silky invites him to come along. Doc sees the chance to ruin Silky by staying behind, and tricks him into signing a power of attorney, giving Doc the right to do as he pleases while Silky is abroad.

Silky has quite an impact upon the English aristocracy with his gangster-like behavior and speech. He gets help from the kind butler, Munsey, and a cousin, Gerald, and soon turns a leaf and begins to treasure the ancient British traditions and his storied family history.

Back in the U.S., Doc is draining the company dry. When the ceremony to elevate Silky to the House of Lords is about to commence, he finds out that he is not only bankrupt but prohibited by the terms of his inheritance from selling his English estate. Silky shoots Doc in anger, and is sentenced to death for murder. He will be hanged by the neck with a silken rope in the Tower of London.

As a boy, however, Silky had been involved in a "blood bath" shooting that left him deathly afraid of firearms. When he'd been left alone in a room with the man who had betrayed him and a loaded gun, only a shot had been heard. Had Silky really pulled that trigger?

Silky accepts his fate and walks with his head held high, as a true nobleman, to the rope and his death, encouraged by Munsey.

== Cast ==
- Robert Montgomery as Robert Kilmount
- Edward Arnold as Quentin "Doc" Ramsey
- Reginald Owen as Gervase Gonwell
- Edmund Gwenn as Munsey, the butler
- E. E. Clive as Mr. Redwood
- Ronald Sinclair as Master Gerald Kilmount
- Norma Varden as Maureen Kilmount
- Halliwell Hobbes as Lord Chancellor
- Ian Wolfe as Reading Clerk
- Peter Godfrey as Judson
- Paul England as Chief Constable
- Billy Bevan as Castle Guide
- Ted Billings as Townsman (uncredited)
- Olaf Hytten as Hodges (uncredited)
- Miles Mander as Attorney General (uncredited)
- Ben Welden as Driver (uncredited)
