= What Women Love =

1920 film by Nate Watt

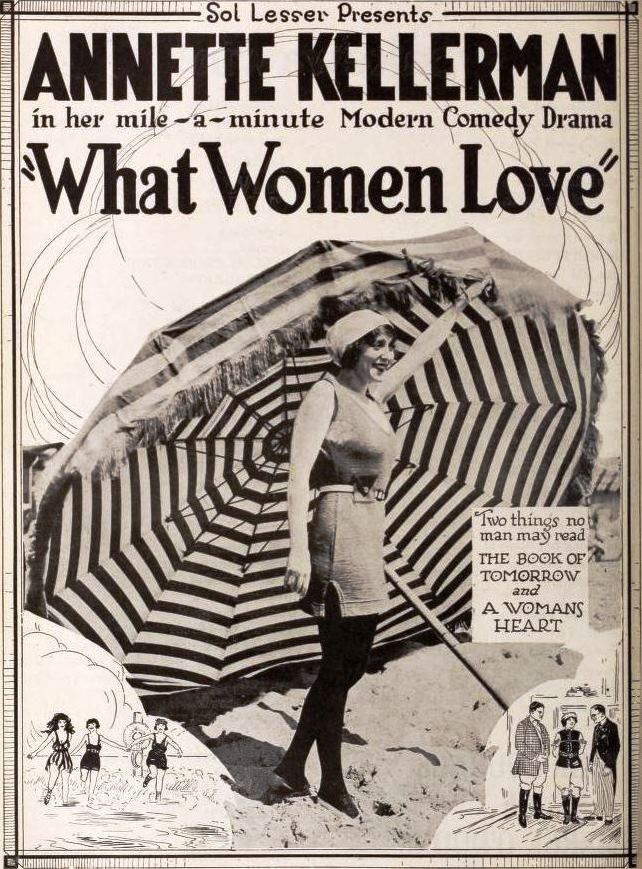
- Advertisement
- Directed by: Nate Watt
- Written by: Katherine Hilliker; Reed Heustis (intertitles); Vincent Bryan (intertitles); William Dudley Pelley
- Story by: Bernard McConville
- Produced by: Sol Lesser; H. P. Caulfield
- Starring: Annette Kellerman
- Edited by: Edward McDermott
- Distributed by: Associated First National
- Release date: August 23, 1920
- Running time: 6 reels
- Country: United States
- Language: Silent (English intertitles)

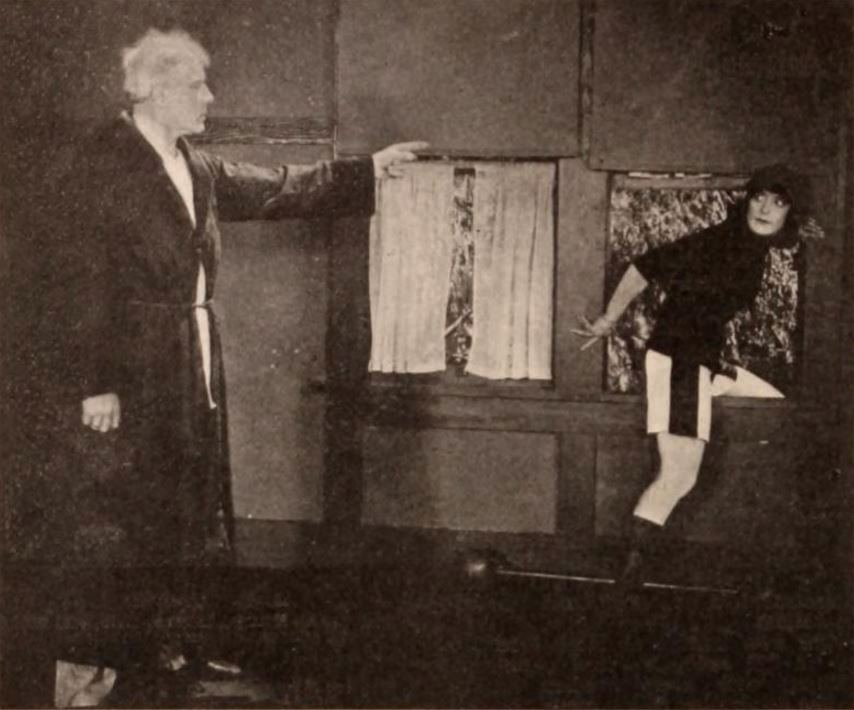
Ralph Lewis and Annette Kellerman

What Women Love is a lost 1920 American silent comedy drama film directed by Nate Watt, based on an original story by Bernard McConville. The film stars Annette Kellerman, Ralph Lewis, and Wheeler Oakman. It was produced by Sol Lesser and distributed by Associated First National.

== Cast ==
- Annette Kellerman as Annabel Cotton
- Ralph Lewis as James King Cotton
- Wheeler Oakman as Willy St. John
- William Fairbanks as Jack Mortimer (credited as Carl Ullman)
- Walter Long as Captain Buck Nelson
- Bull Montana as Jose

== Production ==
The story written by Bernard McConville was purchased for $10,000, and production began on February 2 at Robert Brunton studios, now Paramount Studios. A large tank of water was specially created for the film in Riverside, California and a diving bell was used to film underwater scenes. The scene where Annette Kellerman dived from the top of a schooner yacht, a height of 75 feet, was filmed off the coast of Balboa Beach. In mid-May it was announced that Reed Heustis, writer for the Los Angeles Evening Herald, and Vincent P. Bryan, composer, would be writing the intertitles for the film. Production was completed by late May, in time for the June premiere. The film reportedly cost more than $250,000 to make.

== Release ==
The film was given its premiere on June 1 in Santa Ana, California.

== Preservation ==
With no holdings located in archives, What Women Love is considered a lost film.
