= The Babes in the Woods =

1917 American silent fantasy film

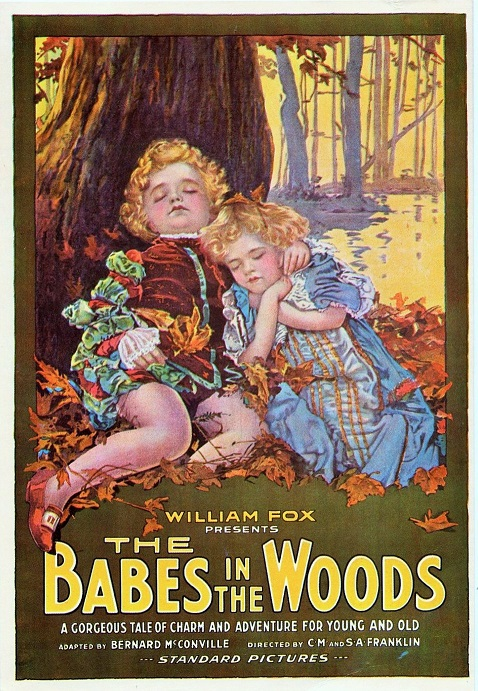
- Theatrical poster
- Directed by: Chester M. Franklin; Sidney Franklin
- Written by: Bernard McConville
- Based on: Hansel and Gretel by Jacob Grimm and Wilhelm Grimm
- Produced by: William Fox
- Starring: Francis Carpenter; Virginia Lee Corbin; Violet Radcliffe
- Cinematography: Harry W. Gerstad
- Production company: Fox Film
- Distributed by: Fox Film
- Release date: December 2, 1917
- Running time: 50 minutes
- Country: United States
- Languages: Silent; English intertitles

The Babes in the Woods is a 1917 American silent fantasy film directed by Chester M. Franklin and Sidney Franklin and starring Francis Carpenter, Virginia Lee Corbin and Violet Radcliffe. Prints of The Babes in the Woods exist in the film holdings of the Niles Essanay Silent Film Museum and in private film collections.

== Cast ==
- Francis Carpenter as Roland/Hansel
- Virginia Lee Corbin as Rose/Gretel
- Violet Radcliffe as The Robber Prince
- Carmen De Rue The Good Fair
- Herschel Mayall as John Hamilton
- Rosita Marstini as Mrs. Hamilton
- Robert Lawler as Mason Hamilton
- Scott McKee as The Butler
- Ted Billings as The Witch
- Buddy Messinger
- Charles Gorman
- Jack R. Hall
- Gertrude Messinger
- Marie Messinger
- Raymond Lee

== Bibliography ==
- Solomon, Aubrey. The Fox Film Corporation, 1915-1935: A History and Filmography. McFarland, 2011.
