= Ralph Lewis (actor) =

American actor (1872-1937)

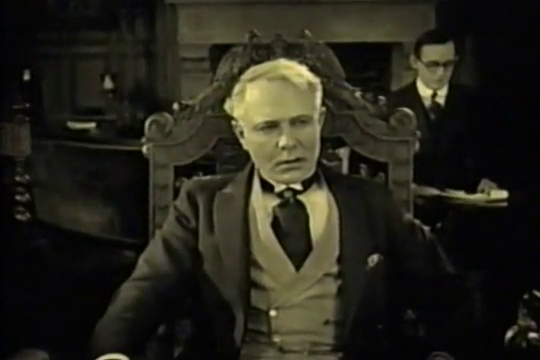
- Lewis in The Hoodlum (1919)
- Born: Ralph Percy Lewis; October 8, 1872; Englewood, Illinois, U.S.
- Died: December 4, 1937 (aged 65); Los Angeles, California, U.S.
- Occupation: Actor
- Years active: 1912–1937
- Spouse: Vera Lewis
- Children: 1

Ralph Percy Lewis (October 8, 1872 – December 4, 1937) was an American actor of the silent film era.

Born in 1872 in Englewood, Illinois, Lewis attended Northwestern University. He portrayed Horace West in the 1907 Broadway production of The Primrose Path.

Lewis appeared in 160 films between 1912 and 1938. The character actor remains perhaps best remembered for his role as abolitionist U.S. Representative Austin Stoneman in D. W. Griffith's The Birth of a Nation (1915) and the governor in Intolerance (1916). Lewis's film debut came in 1912. He also starred in one of the early Hollywood sound shorts, Gaunt, in 1931. He was married to actress Vera Lewis.

Lewis died in Los Angeles, California, on December 4, 1937, after being hit on November 25, 1937, by a limousine driven by a chauffeur working for Jack L. Warner.

== Filmography ==
- The Great Leap: Until Death Do Us Part (1914) (film debut)
- Home, Sweet Home (1914)
- The Escape (1914) as The Senator
- The Avenging Conscience (1914) as The Detective (film debut)
- The Floor Above (1914, Short) as Jerome
- The Birth of a Nation (1915) as Hon. Austin Stoneman, Leader of the House
- The Wolf Man (1915) as Hilbert Grinde, 'The Wolf Man'
- Jordan Is a Hard Road (1915) as Jim Starbuck
- Let Katie Do It (1916) as Uncle Dan Standish
- Martha's Vindication (1916) as Deacon Hunt
- The Flying Torpedo (1916) as Head of the Board
- Macbeth (1916) as Banquo
- Going Straight (1916) as John Remington
- Hell-to-Pay Austin (1916) as Dad Dawson
- Gretchen the Greenhorn (1916) as Jan Van Houck
- Intolerance (1916) as The Governor
- A Sister of Six (1916) as Caleb Winthrop
- The Children Pay (1916) as Theodore Ainsley, the Girls' Father
- A Tale of Two Cities (1917) as Roger Cly
- Her Temptation (1917) as Ralph Stuart
- The Silent Lie (1917) as Hatfield
- Jack and the Beanstalk (1917) as Francis' Father
- This Is the Life (1917) as Count Herman von Nuttenberg
- Cheating the Public (1918) as John Dowling
- Revenge (1918) as 'Sudden' Duncan
- The Kid Is Clever (1918) as Jazzbando Boullion
- Fires of Youth (1918) as John Linforth
- The Talk of the Town (1918)
- The Dub (1919) as Frederick Blatch
- The Long Lane's Turning (1919) as Gov. Eveland
- The Mother and the Law (1919) as The Governor
- The Valley of the Giants (1919) as Col. Pennington
- The Hoodlum (1919) as Alexander Guthrie
- Eyes of Youth (1919) as Robert Goring
- When the Clouds Roll By (1919) as Curtis Brown
- What Women Love (1920) as James King Cotton
- 813 (1920) as Robert Castleback
- Outside the Law (1920) as Silent Madden
- Common Sense (1920) as Dan Bowers
- Prisoners of Love (1921) as Her Father
- Man, Woman & Marriage (1921) as The Father
- Sowing the Wind (1921) as Brabazon
- Salvage (1921) as Cyrus Ridgeway
- A Private Scandal (1921) as Phillip Lawton
- The Conquering Power (1921) as Pere Grandet
- The $5 Baby (1922) as Ben Shapinsky
- In the Name of the Law (1922) as Patrick O'Hara
- Flesh and Blood (1922) as Fletcher Burton
- The Sin Flood (1922) as Fraser
- Broad Daylight (1922) as Peter Fay
- Environment (1922) as Diamond Jim Favre
- The Third Alarm (1922) as Dan McDowell
- The Fog (1923) as Johnathan Forge
- The West~Bound Limited (1923) as Bill Buckley
- Vengeance of the Deep (1923) as Captain Musgrove
- Tea: With a Kick! (1923) as Jim Day
- Desire (1923) as De Witt Harlan
- Blow Your Own Horn (1923) as Nicholas Small
- The Mailman (1923) as Bob Morley
- Untamed Youth (1924) as Joe Ardis
- The Man Who Came Back (1924) as Thomas Potter
- Dante's Inferno (1924) as The Man, Mortimer Judd
- In Every Woman's Life (1924) as Captain
- East of Broadway (1924) as Commissioner
- The Bridge of Sighs (1925) as William Craig
- Who Cares (1925) as Grandfather Ludlow
- The Million Dollar Handicap (1925) as John Porter
- The Re-Creation of Brian Kent (1925) as Homer Ward
- The Overland Limited (1925) as Ed Barton
- Heir-Loons (1925)
- One of the Bravest (1925) as John Kelly
- The Last Edition (1925) as Tom McDonald
- The Lady from Hell (1926) as Earl of Kennet
- Shadow of the Law (1926) as Brophy
- Fascinating Youth (1926) as John Ward
- Bigger Than Barnum's (1926) as Peter Blandin
- The Block Signal (1926) as 'Jovial Joe' Ryan
- The False Alarm (1926) as Fighting John Casey
- The Silent Power (1926) as John Rollins
- Held by the Law (1927) as George Travis
- The Sunset Derby (1927) as Sam Gibson
- The Shield of Honor (1927) as Dan MacDowell
- Casey Jones (1927) as Casey Jones
- Outcast Souls (1928) as John Turner
- Crooks Can't Win (1928) as Dad Gillen
- The Girl in the Glass Cage (1929) as John Cosgrove
- The Bad One (1930) as Blochet
- Abraham Lincoln (1930) as Member of Lincoln's Cabinet (uncredited)
- The Fourth Alarm (1930) as Chief Turner
- The Lost Squadron (1930) as Joe
- American Madness (1932) as Judge (uncredited)
- McKenna of the Mounted (1932) as Kennedy
- Strange Justice (1932) as Prison Warden (uncredited)
- Call Her Savage (1932) as Doctor (uncredited)
- The Death Kiss (1932) as Winchell (uncredited)
- Sucker Money (1933) as John Walton
- Somewhere in Sonora (1933) as Mr. Kelly Burton
- Riot Squad (1933) as Judge Nathaniel Moore
- Mystery Liner (1934) as Prof. Grimson
- Badge of Honor (1934) as Randall Brewster
- Fighting Hero (1934) as The Judge
- Terror of the Plains (1934) as Dad Lansing
- Ready for Love (1934) as Mr. Thompson (uncredited)
- When Lightning Strikes (1934) as Minor Role (uncredited)
- Outlaw Rule (1935) as John Lathrop
- The Lost City (1935, Serial) as Prof. Reynolds [Chs.1-4]
- Behind the Green Lights (1935) as Judge #2 / Lawyer
- Born to Battle (1935) as Justice Hiram McClump
- Sunset Range (1935) as Sheriff
- Diamond Jim (1935) as Man at Bar (uncredited)
- Dr. Socrates (1935) as Bookstore Proprietor (uncredited)
- Thanks a Million (1935) as Politician (uncredited)
- Swifty (1935) as Alec McNiel
- Border Flight (1936) as Boat Captain (uncredited)
- San Francisco (1936) as Founders' Club Member (uncredited)
- The Accusing Finger (1936) as Senator (uncredited)
- Make Way for Tomorrow (1937) as Business Man (uncredited)
- West Bound Limited (1937) as Foreman of the Jury (uncredited)
- Behind the Mike (1937) as Townsman (uncredited)
- Music for Madame (1937) as Henchman (uncredited)
- The Buccaneer (1938) as Prominent Gentleman (uncredited)
