= The Old Nest =

1921 silent film by Reginald Barker

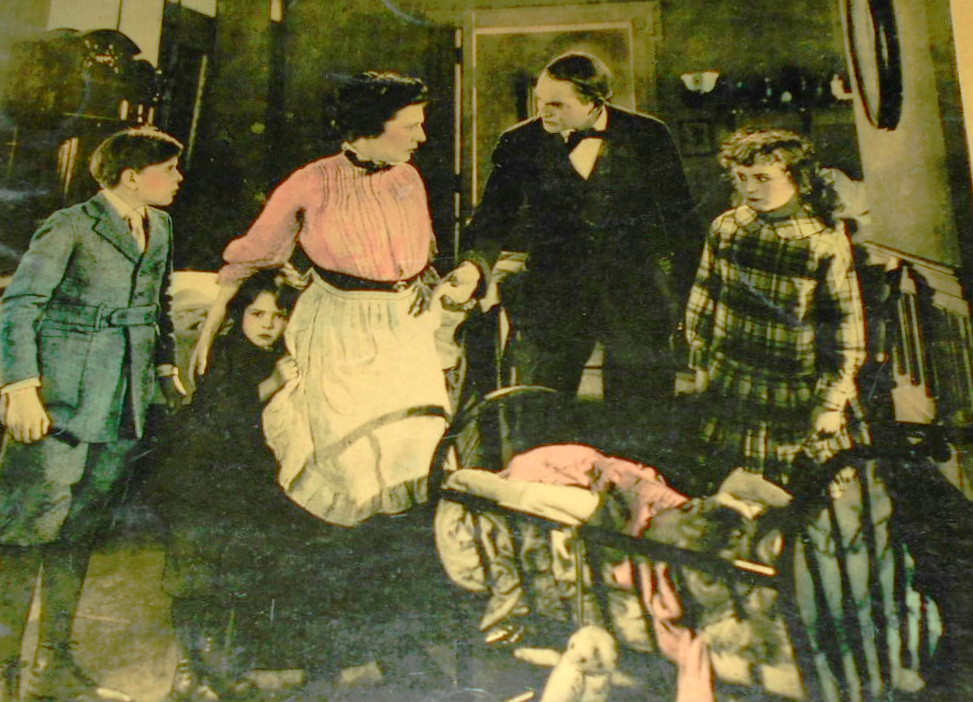
- Lobby card
- Directed by: Reginald Barker
- Screenplay by: Rupert Hughes
- Story by: Rupert Hughes
- Cinematography: Philip Hatkin; Percy Hilburn
- Production company: Goldwyn Pictures Corporation
- Distributed by: Goldwyn Pictures Corporation
- Release date: June 28, 1921 (U.S.)
- Running time: 80 minutes
- Country: United States

The Old Nest is a 1921 American drama silent black and white film directed by Reginald Barker and starring Helene Chadwick. It was awarded for the National High School Students' Poll for Best Picture They Had Ever Seen. It is based on the short story by Rupert Hughes, which was one of the most notably adaptations as Behind the Screen (1916).

== Cast ==
- Dwight Crittendon as Dr. Horace Anthon
- Mary Alden as Mrs. Anthon
- Nick Cogley as Uncle Ned
- Fanny Stockbridge as Hannah
- Laura La Varnie as Mrs. Guthrie
- Edward Peil Jr. as Tom at 13
- Richard Tucker as Tom at 36
- Marshall Ricksen as Arthur at 14
- Buddy Messinger as Jim at 10
- Cullen Landis as Jim at 22-32
- Lucille Ricksen as Kate at 9
- Louise Lovely as Kate at 21-31
- Robert DeVilbiss as Frank at 6
- J. Parks Jones as Frank at 18-28
- Marie Moorehouse as Baby Emily
- Helene Chadwick as Emily at 22
- Theodore von Eltz as Stephen McLeod
- Molly Malone as Molly McLeod
- Maurice B. Flynn as Harry Andrews
- Roland Rushton as Mr. Atkinson
- Billie Cotton as Emily at 12

== Preservation ==
The film does survive, in a print held at Cinémathèque française.
