= The Little School Ma'am =

1916 film

- Directed by: C.M. Franklin; S.A. Franklin; Millard Webb
- Story by: Bernard McConville; Frank E. Woods
- Cinematography: Frank B. Good
- Production company: Fine Arts Film Company
- Distributed by: Triangle Distributing
- Release date: July 16, 1916 (U.S.)
- Running time: 50 min
- Country: United States

The Little School Ma'am is a 1916 American drama silent black and white film directed by C.M. Franklin and S.A. Franklin and written by Bernard McConville and Frank E. Woods. It stars Dorothy Gish.

== Cast ==
- Dorothy Gish as Nan
- Elmer Clifton as Wilbur Howard
- George C. Pearce as Squire Tolliver
- Jack Brammall as Jim Tolliver
- Howard Gaye as Old Man Tyler
- Josephine Crowell as Widow Larkin
- Luray Huntley as Sally
- Millard Webb as Jebb
- Hal Wilson as Washington
- Georgie Stone as Billy
- Francis Carpenter as One of the Children
- 'Baby' Carmen De Rue as One of the Children
- Violet Radcliffe as One of the Children
