= Louise Owen =

American actress

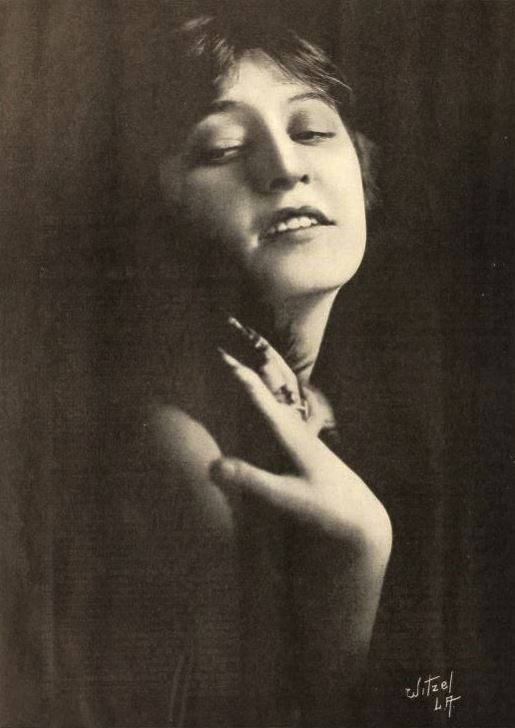
- Louise Owen, from a 1916 publication
- Born: Louise Alva Owen; February 1, 1895; New York, New York, U.S.
- Died: November 17, 1973 (age 78); Los Angeles, California, U.S.
- Other name: Louise O. McConville
- Occupation: Actress
- Spouse: Bernard McConville

Louise Alva Owen McConville (February 1, 1895 – November 17, 1973) was an American actress on Broadway and in silent films in the 1910s.

== Early life and education ==
Owen was born in New York City, the daughter of Alva Owen and Dorothy Bessenger Owen. Her mother was born in Canada, and her father was a physician who died in 1897, when he was kicked by a horse. Owen was an actress by age 15, when she and her widowed mother were living with her German-born maternal grandparents in 1910.

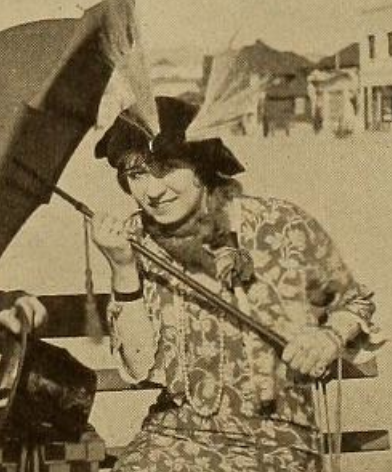
Louise Alva Owen on a set, from a 1916 publication

== Career ==
Owen's Broadway credits included roles in The Wife Hunters (1911), Hokey-Pokey/Bunty, Bulls, and Strings (1912), The Honeymoon Express (1913) and Cheer Up (1917–1918). She appeared in dozens of silent short films between 1914 and 1916, mostly comedies for Vogue Films. "Miss Owen is the athletic type who would much rather take long walks in the foothills than sit at home doing embroidery or playing with the cat" reported Motography in 1916.

Owen was also known as a visual artist. In the 1930s she wrote the lyrics for songs in a radio musical drama, The Song of Araby. During World War II, she served on the Eagle Rock gasoline rationing board.

== Selected filmography ==
- The Boob and the Baker (1915)
- The Skating Rink (1916)
- She Wasn't That Kind of a Girl (1916)
- Igorrotes, Crocodiles and a Hat Box (1916)
- Heaven Will Protect a Woiking Goil (1916)
- The Lion Hearted Chief (1916)
- Bungling Bill, Detective (1916)
- Bungling Bill's Dream (1916)
- A Fool and His Dream (1916)

== Personal life ==
Owen married writer Bernard McConville in 1917. They had children Patricia, Sheila, and Lee Bernard Jr. Her daughter Sheila died in 1950, her husband died in 1961, and she died in 1973, at the age of 78, in Los Angeles.
