= Ted Billings =

American actor (1880–1947)

- Born: April 7, 1880; London, England, United Kingdom
- Died: July 5, 1947 (aged 67); Los Angeles County, California, United States
- Occupation: Actor
- Years active: 1917–47

Ted Billings (April 7, 1880 – July 5, 1947) was an American character actor of the silent and sound film eras. Born in London, England on April 7, 1880, Billings made his film debut in the role of the Witch, in 1917's The Babes in the Woods, which starred Francis Carpenter and Virginia Lee Corbin as Hansel and Gretel. Over the course of his career he would appear in over 100 films, mostly in unnamed, un-credited roles.

Some of the more notable films in which he appeared include: in the featured role of Ludwig in 1935's Bride of Frankenstein, starring Boris Karloff; the 1937 version of The Prince and the Pauper, Errol Flynn, Claude Rains, and Billy and Bobby Mauch; Stagecoach (1939), starring John Wayne and Claire Trevor; Mrs. Miniver (1942), starring Greer Garson and Walter Pidgeon; the Bob Hope comedy, The Princess and the Pirate; and the 1947 classic comedy, The Secret Life of Walter Mitty, starring Danny Kaye and Virginia Mayo.

His final screen appearance was in a small, unnamed role in Otto Preminger's Forever Amber, starring Linda Darnell and Cornel Wilde; the film was released in October 1947, three months after Billings' death on July 5, 1947.

== Selected filmography ==
- The Babes in the Woods (1917)
- The Prisoner of Zenda (1922) (film debut)
- Robin Hood (1922)
- Disraeli (1929)
- Moby Dick (1930)
- Frankenstein (1931)
- Murders in the Rue Morgue (1932)
- Sherlock Holmes (1932)
- Cavalcade (1933)
- The Invisible Man (1933)
- The Man Who Reclaimed His Head (1934)
- Clive of India (1935)
- The Bride of Frankenstein (1935)
- Bonnie Scotland (1935)
- Captain Blood (1935)
- The Invisible Ray (1936)
- Dodsworth (1936)
- The Prince and the Pauper (1937)
- A Christmas Carol (1938)
- Mr. Moto's Last Warning (1939)
- Stagecoach (1939)
- The Man in the Iron Mask (1939)
- The Adventures of Sherlock Holmes (1939)
- Tower of London (1939)
- The Earl of Chicago (1940)
- Abe Lincoln in Illinois (1940)
- The Son of Monte Cristo (1940)
- Man Hunt (1941)
- Dr. Jekyll and Mr. Hyde (1941)
- Shadow of the Thin Man (1941)
- Sullivan's Travels (1941)
- Mrs. Miniver (1942)
- Tales of Manhattan (1942)
- The Voice of Terror (1942)
- Sherlock Holmes and the Secret Weapon (1942)
- Mission to Moscow (1943)
- Flesh and Fantasy (1943)
- The Song of Bernadette (1943)
- Jane Eyre (1943)
- The Lodger (1944)
- The Scarlet Claw (1944)
- The Princess and the Pirate (1944)
- Belle of the Yukon (1944)
- The Invisible Man's Revenge (1944)
- Hangover Square (1945)
- The Body Snatcher (1945)
- Tarzan and the Leopard Woman (1946)
- Bedlam (1946)
- Dressed to Kill (1946)
- Dangerous Money (1946)
- The Razor's Edge (1946)
- The Secret Life of Walter Mitty (1947)
- Forever Amber (1947) (final film)
