= Carmen De Rue =

American actress (1908–1986)

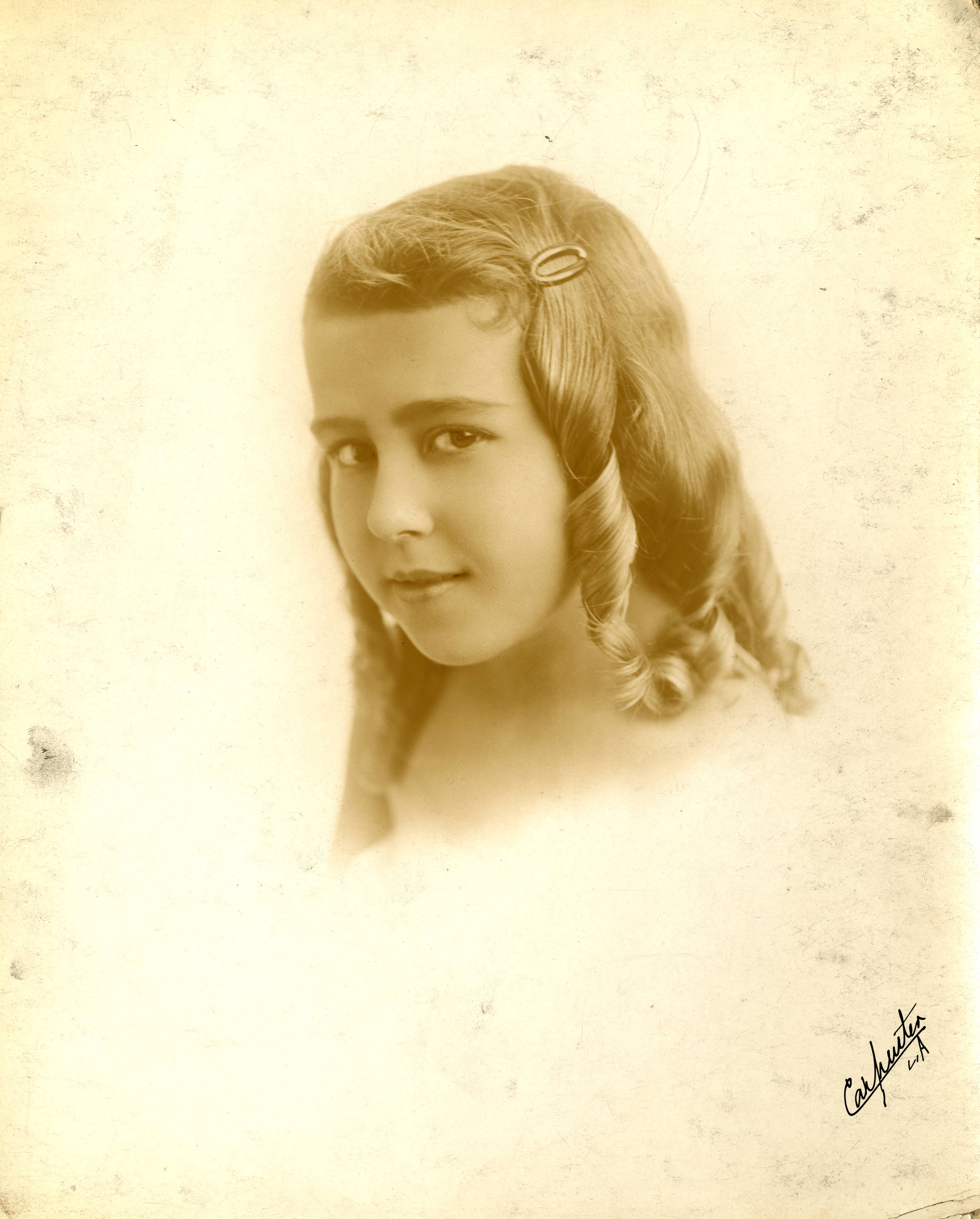
- Born: Carmen Faye DeRue; February 6, 1908; Pueblo, Colorado, US
- Died: September 28, 1986 (aged 78); North Hollywood, California
- Other name: "Baby" Carmen De Rue
- Occupation: Child actress

Carmen De Rue (often billed as "Baby" Carmen De Rue, and occasionally as Freddy DeRue) was an American child actress and dancer who appeared in an estimated 200 Hollywood films in the 1910s.

== Biography ==
Carmen was born in Pueblo, Colorado, to Eugene DeRue and Grace Butner. The family moved to Los Angeles when she was a young child, and she soon began appearing in Hollywood films. Her father eventually became a producer and director after working as a reporter at The Los Angeles Times.

Carmen retired from acting on-screen by the time she reached adulthood, although she worked as a professional dancer for a time. She married Harold Bjorgo, the owner of an Eagle Rock Grocery Store, in the 1928. That marriage ended in divorce a year later. She later married Fred Schrott.

She died in 1986 in North Hollywood, California, after suffering a heart attack.

== Selected filmography ==
- The Squaw Man (1914)
- Going Straight (1916)
- A Sister of Six (1916)
- The Babes in the Woods (1917)
- The Girl with the Champagne Eyes (1918)
- Fan Fan (1918)
