= Francis Carpenter (actor) =

American actor

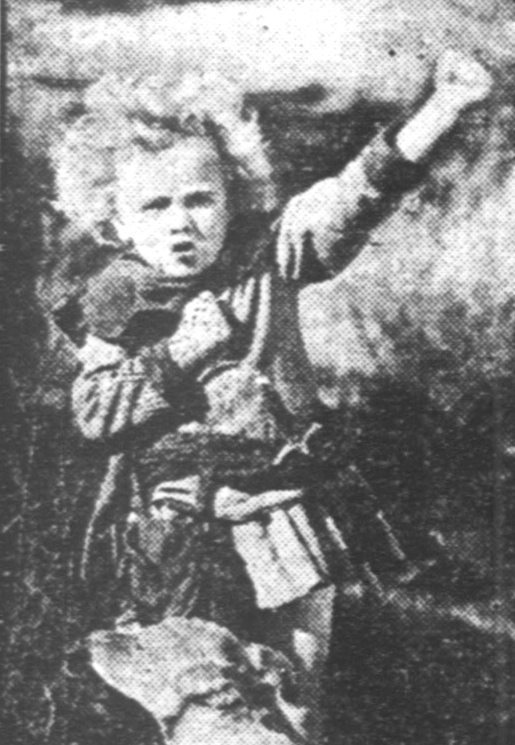
- Francis Carpenter as he appeared in the 1917 film Jack and the Beanstalk
- Born: 1910
- Died: 1973 (aged 63)
- Occupation: Actor
- Years active: 1914–1923 (film)

Francis Carpenter (1910–1973) was an American child actor active in films of the silent era. He co-starred with Virginia Lee Corbin in films including Jack and the Beanstalk.

Carpenter's parents were H. B. Carpenter and Beatrice Allen Carpenter. His father was an actor in stock theater in Ogden, Utah. The Sunday Record days he was born July 9, 1910 in Glenwood Springs, Colorado.

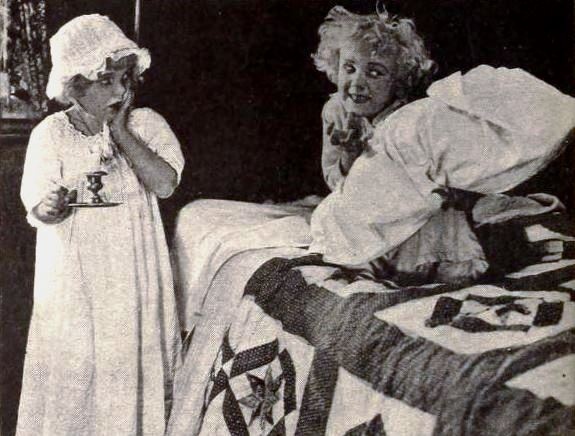
A scene from Treasure Island 1918, with Virginia Lee Corbin and Francis Carpenter.

== Selected filmography ==
- Old Heidelberg (1915)
- The Commanding Officer (1915)
- Macbeth (1916)
- Martha's Vindication (1916)
- Intolerance (1916)
- A Sister of Six (1916)
- Let Katie Do It (1916)
- Aladdin and the Wonderful Lamp (1917)
- Jack and the Beanstalk (1917)
- The Babes in the Woods (1917)
- Cheerful Givers (1917)
- True Blue (1918)
- Treasure Island (1918)
- The Forbidden Room (1919)
- The Orphan (1920)
- Rip Van Winkle (1921)
- The Infamous Miss Revell (1921)
- The Lone Star Ranger (1923)

== Bibliography ==
- Solomon, Aubrey. The Fox Film Corporation, 1915–1935: A History and Filmography. McFarland, 2011.
