= You Never Can Tell (1920 film) =

1920 film

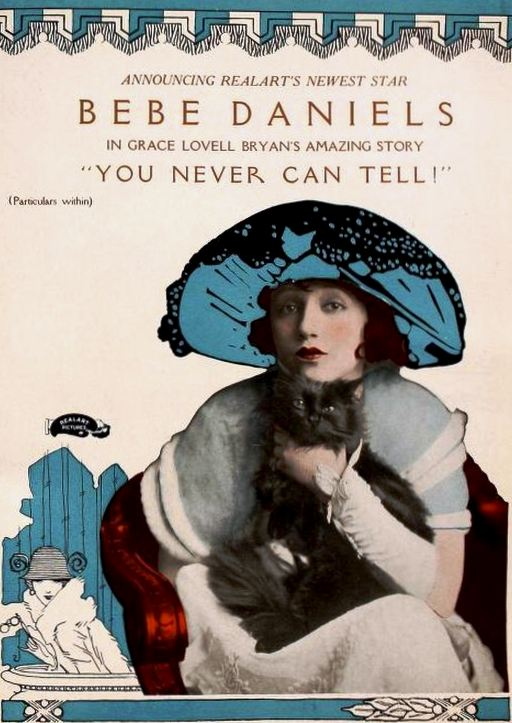
- Advertisement for the film
- Directed by: Chester M. Franklin
- Written by: Thomas J. Geraghty; Helmer Walton Bergman
- Story by: Grace Lovell Bryan
- Produced by: Adolph Zukor
- Starring: Bebe Daniels; Jack Mulhall
- Cinematography: Victor L. Ackland
- Production company: Realart Pictures Corporation
- Distributed by: Realart Pictures Corporation
- Release date: September 22, 1920
- Running time: 50 minutes
- Country: United States
- Language: Silent (English intertitles)

You Never Can Tell is a 1920 American romantic comedy film produced by the Realart company, an affiliate of Paramount Pictures, and distributed by Realart. Chester M. Franklin directed and Bebe Daniels starred in the film. The film is based on several short stories You Never Can Tell and Class by Grace Lovell Bryan. A surviving print of the film is housed in the Library of Congress.

== Cast ==
- Bebe Daniels as Rowena Patricia Jones
- Jack Mulhall as Prince
- Edward Martindel as William Vaughn
- Helen Dunbar as Mrs. Vaughn
- Harold Goodwin as Jimmy Flannery
- Neely Edwards as Mysterious Sport
- Leo White as Mr. Renan
- Milla Davenport as Mrs. Jones
- Graham Pettie as Wilberforce Jones
- Gertrude Short as Vera
