= The Hoodlum (1919 film) =

1919 film directed by Sidney Franklin

- PLAY film; runtime 01:22:37 with credits.
- Directed by: Sidney Franklin
- Based on: Burkeses Amy by Julie M. Lippmann
- Produced by: Mary Pickford
- Starring: Mary Pickford
- Cinematography: Charles Rosher
- Edited by: Edward McDermott
- Distributed by: First National
- Release date: August 31, 1919
- Running time: 78 minutes; 7 reels (6,462 feet)
- Country: United States
- Languages: Silent film English intertitles

The Hoodlum is a 1919 silent film comedy-drama produced by and starring Mary Pickford and released through First National. The film was directed by Sidney A. Franklin and was based on the novel Burkeses Amy by Julie Mathilde Lippmann.

== Plot ==
Spoiled Amy Burke lives with her doting grandfather, ruthless business magnate Alexander Guthrie, in his Fifth Avenue, New York City mansion. She is initially delighted when he offers to take her with him on a trip to Europe. However, as the day approaches for their departure, she changes her mind and decides to go live with her newly returned father, "sociological writer" John Burke, at Craigen Street, wherever that is. Unused to having his plans thwarted, Guthrie becomes cold to his beloved granddaughter.

Craigen Street turns out to be in one of the slums of lower New York, the subject of her father's study. At first, Amy is horrified by the squalor. She makes it clear to a couple of friendly young women who want to become acquainted and to Nora, her father's cook and servant, that she feels she is far above them. Deeply unhappy, she eventually takes her father's advice to treat their neighbors as equals. She fits in after several weeks. She makes friends with boy inventor Dish Lowry and young man William Turner, a reclusive neighbor. Amy also ends a years-long feud between Irishman Pat O'Shaughnessy and Jew Abram Isaacs through good-natured trickery.

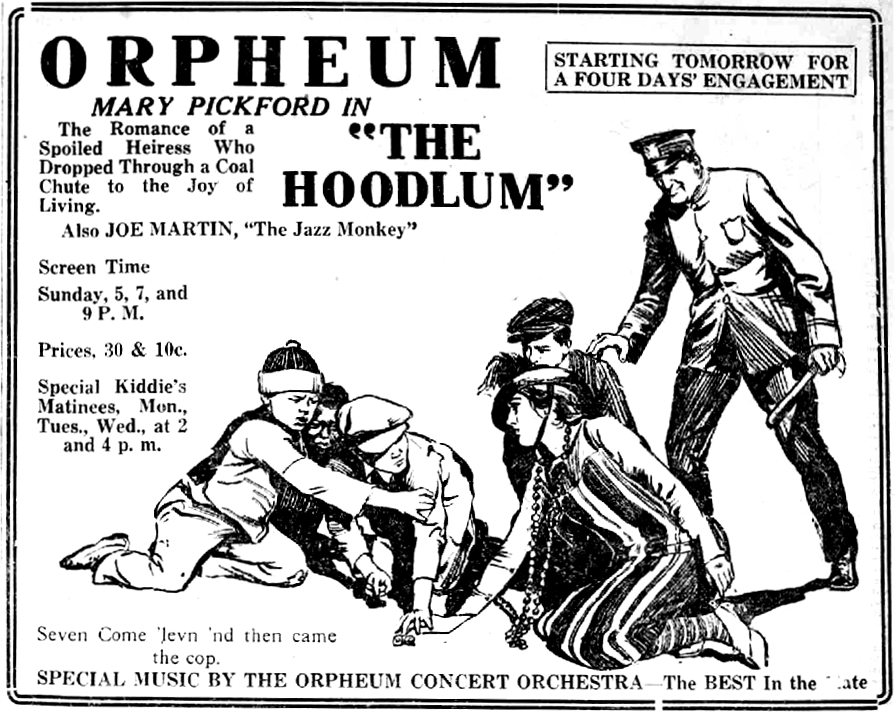
Newspaper advertisement for film in The Ogden Standard, Utah

When a policeman is alerted by a sore loser to her game of craps in the street, she escapes by hiding under the cloak of newcomer Peter Cooper, who takes a room on the floor above the Burkes'. Unbeknownst to Amy, the new resident is actually her grandfather in disguise, come to see how she is doing. He is initially disgusted with her behavior, noting on paper that she "has become a hoodlum". When Amy takes a sick mother and her children under her wing, she asks Cooper to look after a baby, only to be brusquely rebuffed. Cooper has a change of heart, however, and adopts a whole new, more benevolent attitude, much to Amy's delight. He returns to his mansion a changed man (taking along Dish Lowry).

One night, Amy spots a thief in Turner's room. The intruder flees. Turner informs Amy that it was no thief but an agent of Alexander Guthrie looking for his writings. Guthrie framed him to hide corrupt business practices, resulting in a year in the penitentiary. Amy and Turner break into her grandfather's mansion to try to steal evidence that would prove him innocent, but set off a burglar alarm and are caught. When Guthrie recognizes Amy, he has Turner freed and offers to exonerate him. Afterward, Amy and Turner are married.

== Cast ==
- Mary Pickford as Amy Burke
- Ralph Lewis as Alexander Guthrie/"Peter Cooper"
- Kenneth Harlan as William Turner
- T. D. Crittenden as John Burke
- Aggie Herring as Nora
- Andrew Arbuckle as Pat O'Shaughnessy
- Max Davidson as Abram Isaacs
- Paul Mullen as The Pugilist
- Buddy Messinger as Dish Lowry
- Ralph Lewis as Alexander Guthrie

== Public service announcement ==
At least some prints of the film open with Pickford in a public service announcement for World War I war savings stamps.

== Preservation ==
The Hoodlum was preserved by the Academy Film Archive in 1998.

== Home media ==
The film is in the public domain. It has been released on DVD and Blu-ray.

== See also ==
- Mary Pickford filmography
