= Gretchen the Greenhorn =

1916 film by Chester M. Franklin

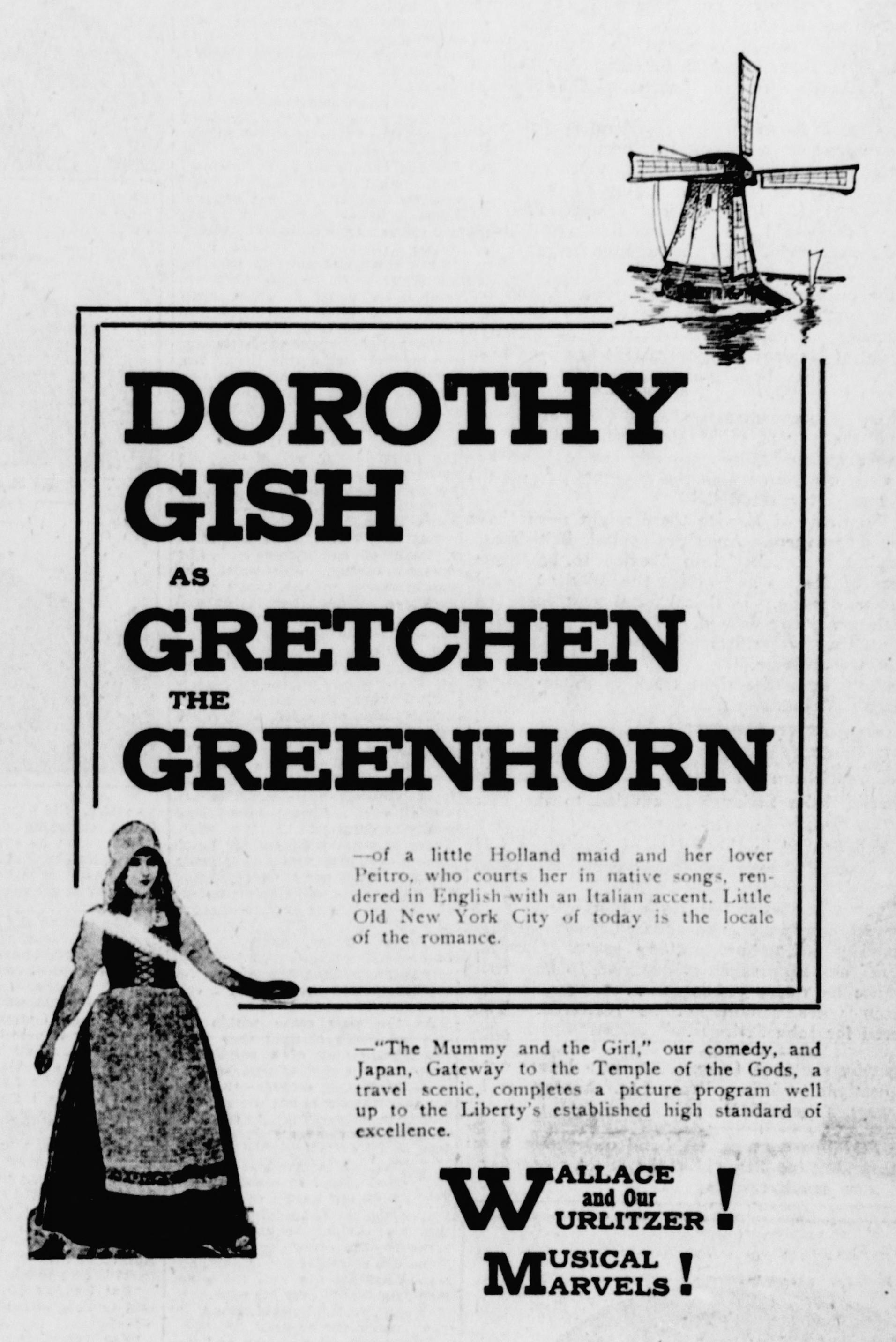
- Newspaper advertisement
- Directed by: Chester M. Franklin; Sidney A. Franklin
- Story by: Bernard McConville
- Starring: Dorothy Gish; Ralph Lewis; Eugene Pallette
- Production company: Fine Arts Film Company
- Distributed by: Triangle Film Corporation
- Release date: September 3, 1916
- Running time: 5 reels 58 minutes (restored version)
- Country: United States
- Languages: Silent; English intertitles

Gretchen the Greenhorn is an American silent film released in 1916. The film stars Dorothy Gish as a Dutch girl who emigrates to America to be with her father; they become entangled with a counterfeiting ring. Set in an immigrant section of an American city, the film avoids heavy stereotyping, according to the booklet accompanying the DVD release notes.

== Cast ==
- Dorothy Gish as Gretchen Van Houck
- Ralph Lewis as Jan Van Houck
- Eugene Pallette as Rodgers
- Elmo Lincoln as Mystery Ship Captain
- Frank Bennett as Pietro
- Georgie Stone as Little Nicky Garrity
- Kate Bruce as Widow Garrity

== Preservation status ==
The only known complete copy was donated by Galen Biery to the Hollywood Studio Museum in 1991. Fully restored, it was presented at a UCLA film festival in 1993 and is in the Museum of Modern Art and UCLA Film and Television Archives.

== Home media ==
It is included in the 2004 DVD box set More Treasures from American Film Archives, 1894-1931.
