= Sidney Franklin (director) =

American film director

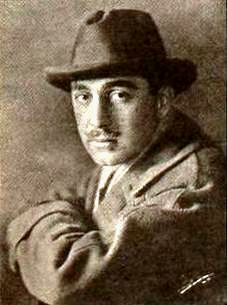
- Franklin in 1920
- Born: Sidney Arnold Franklin; March 21, 1893; San Francisco, California, US
- Died: May 18, 1972 (aged 79); Santa Monica, California, US
- Resting place: Hollywood Forever Cemetery
- Spouses: Ann Denitz (m. 1916; div. 1933) Ruth Helms (m. 1937; died 1960) Enid Bennett (m. 1963; died 1969)
- Children: 1

Sidney Arnold Franklin (March 21, 1893 – May 18, 1972) was an American film director and producer. Franklin, like William C. deMille, specialized in adapting literary works or Broadway stage plays.

His brother Chester Franklin (1889–1954) also became a director during the silent film era, best known for directing the early Technicolor film The Toll of the Sea.

Franklin's work on radio included directing The Screen Guild Show in 1939.

He died on 18 May 1972 at St. John's Hospital in Santa Monica, California.

== Partial filmography ==
=== Director ===
- Gretchen the Greenhorn (1916) co-directed with brother Chester
- A Sister of Six (1916) co-directed with brother Chester
- The Little School Ma'am (1916)
- Jack and the Beanstalk (1917) co-directed with brother Chester
- The Babes in the Woods (1917) co-directed with brother Chester
- Treasure Island (1918) co-directed with Chester
- The Safety Curtain (1918)
- Her Only Way (1918)
- The Forbidden City (1918)
- The Hoodlum (1919)
- A Virtuous Vamp (1919) assistant director with David Kirkland
- Courage (1921)
- Not Guilty (1921)
- Smilin' Through (1922)
- The Primitive Lover (1922)
- Dulcy (1923)
- Her Sister from Paris (1925)
- Learning to Love (1925)
- Beverly of Graustark (1926)
- The Actress (1928)
- The Last of Mrs. Cheyney (1929)
- Wild Orchids (1929)
- Devil-May-Care (1929)
- A Lady's Morals (1930)
- Private Lives (1931)
- Smilin' Through (1932)
- The Barretts of Wimpole Street (1934)
  - The Barretts of Wimpole Street (1957; a scene-for-scene remake of the 1934 version)
- The Dark Angel (1935)
- The Good Earth (1937) - nominated for Academy Award for Best Director
- Duel in the Sun (1946), uncredited

=== Producer ===
- Ninotchka (1939) (associate producer)
- Waterloo Bridge (1940)
- Mrs. Miniver (1942)
- Random Harvest (1942)
- Bambi (1942; animated by Walt Disney Productions while Franklin served as creative consultant)
- Madame Curie (1943)
- The White Cliffs of Dover (1944)
- The Yearling (1946)
- Homecoming (1948)
- Command Decision (1948)
- The Miniver Story (1950)
- Fearless Fagan (1952) (associate producer)
- Sky Full of Moon (1952)
- The Story of Three Loves (1953)
- Gypsy Colt (1953)
- Young Bess (1953)
- Torch Song (1953)

=== Actor ===
- A Rogue's Romance (1919) - Burgomaster
- The Man in the Moonlight (1919) - Pierre Delorme
- Down Home (1920) - Cash Bailey
- The Blue Moon (1920) - Louie Solomon
- Fashion Row (1923)
- Ben-Hur (1925) - Chariot Race Spectator (uncredited)
- Mrs. Miniver (1942) - Man at Flower Show (uncredited) (final film role)
