= Chester M. Franklin =

American film director

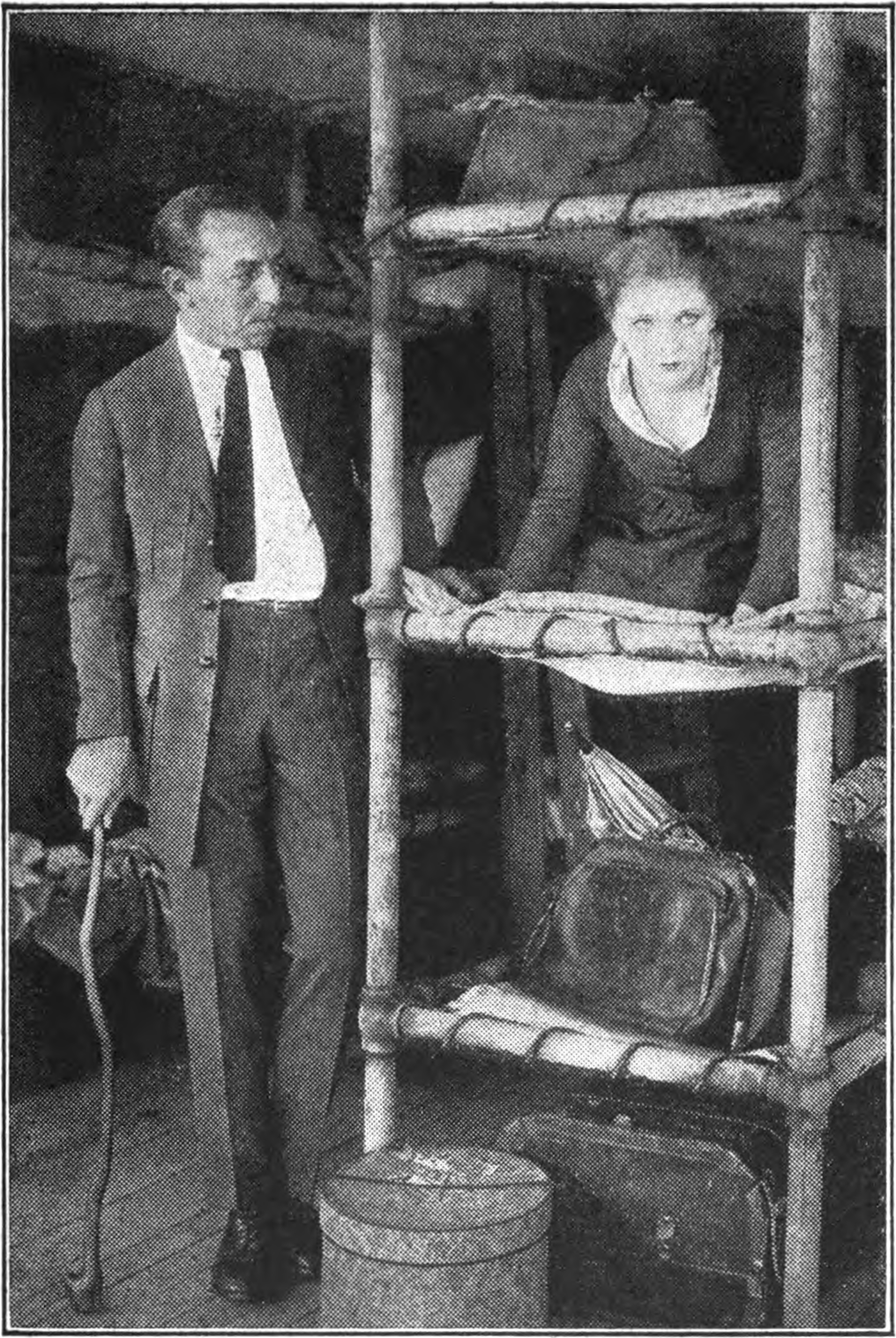
- Director Chester M. Franklin with actress Mary Miles Minter
- Born: Chester Mortimer Franklin; September 1, 1889; San Francisco, California
- Died: March 12, 1954 (aged 64); Los Angeles, California
- Resting place: Forest Lawn Memorial Park, Glendale
- Occupation: Director
- Years active: 1912–1936
- Spouse(s): Ruth Darling (died 1918) Mildred Nadel (m. 1926)
- Relatives: Sidney Franklin (brother)

Chester Mortimer Franklin (September 1, 1889 – March 12, 1954) was an American film director and actor active mainly in the silent era. Born in San Francisco, he was the brother of Sidney A. Franklin. In the late 1910s, he co-directed with his brother Sidney several films with all-children casts for William Fox. He directed two silent horror films, the 1924 Behind the Curtain (a.k.a. Souls Which Pass in the Night) and the 1927 The Thirteenth Hour.

== Partial filmography ==
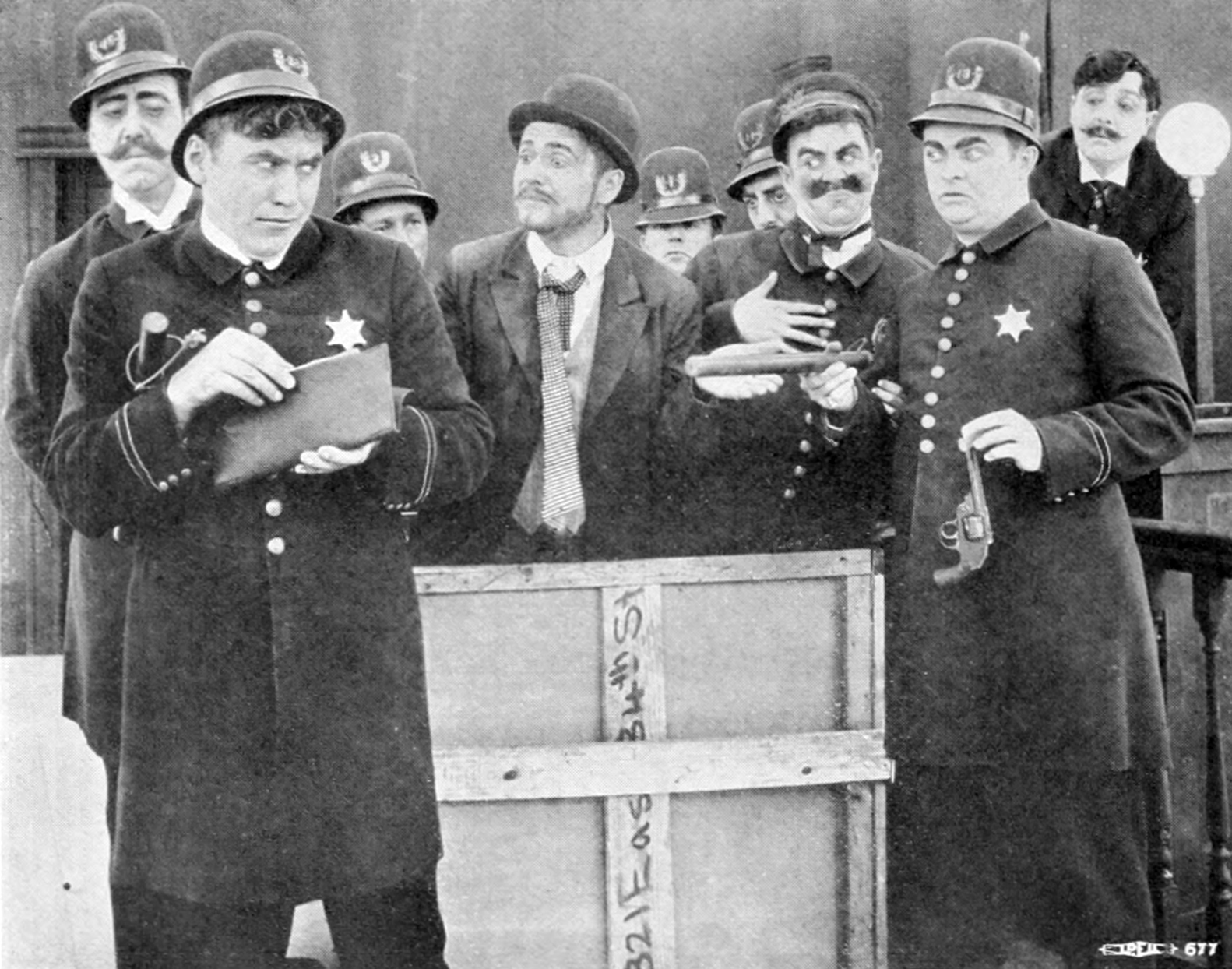
Photo of the Keystone Cops from 1912, "Chet" Franklin in back fourth from right

- Going Straight (1916)
- Gretchen the Greenhorn (1916)
- The Little School Ma'am (1916)
- The Babes in the Woods (1917)
- Jack and the Beanstalk (1917)
- Treasure Island (1918)
- You Never Can Tell (1920)
- All Soul's Eve (1921)
- The Case of Becky (1921)
- Nancy from Nowhere (1922)
- A Game Chicken (1922)
- The Toll of the Sea (1922)
- Where the North Begins (1923)
- The Song of Love (1923)
- Behind the Curtain (1924)
- The Thirteenth Hour (1927)
- Detectives (1928)
- Vanity Fair (1932)
- File 113 (1933)
- The Iron Master (1933)
- Sequoia (1934)
- Tough Guy (1936)
