= Bernard McConville =

American screenwriter

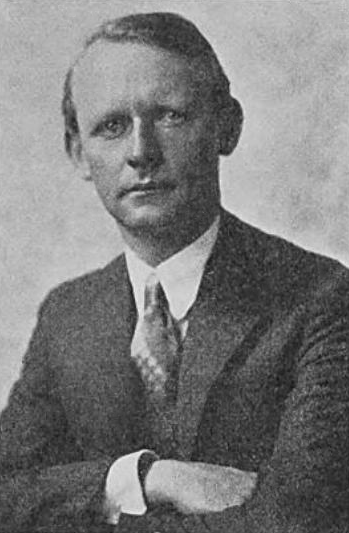
- Born: October 16, 1887; Denver, Colorado, U.S.
- Died: December 27, 1961 (aged 74); Los Angeles County, California, U.S.
- Occupation: Screenwriter
- Years active: 1915–1946
- Spouse: Louise Owen

Lee Bernard McConville (October 16, 1887 – December 27, 1961) was an American screenwriter. He wrote for more than 90 films between 1915 and 1946. He was born in Denver, Colorado and died in Los Angeles County, California. He married actress Louise Owen in 1917. He died in 1961, at the age of 74.

== Partial filmography ==
- Gretchen the Greenhorn (1916)
- The Little School Ma'am (1916)
- The Rose of Blood (1917)
- The Babes in the Woods (1917)
- The Deciding Kiss (1918)
- Rosemary Climbs the Heights (1918)
- That Devil, Bateese (1918)
- Bare Fists (1919)
- The Sleeping Lion (1919)
- What Women Love (1920)
- 45 Minutes from Broadway (1920)
- A Connecticut Yankee in King Arthur's Court (1921)
- Shame (1921)
- Little Lord Fauntleroy (1921)
- Without Compromise (1922)
- Stepping Fast (1923)
- Crinoline and Romance (1923)
- Wings of Youth (1925)
- The Phantom of the Opera (1925)
- Volcano! (1926)
- Cannonball Express (1932)
- King of the Pecos (1936)
- The Lonely Trail (1936)
- I Cover the War (1937)
- Overland Stage Raiders (1938)
- Arizona Legion (1939)
