= Puppets of Fate =

Puppets of Fate may refer to:

- Puppets of Fate (1921 film), 1921 American silent melodrama directed by Dallas M. Fitzgerald for Metro Pictures
- Puppets of Fate (1933 film), 1933 British crime film directed by George A. Cooper
