= Gun Law =

Gun law regulates the manufacture, sale, transfer, possession, modification and use of small arms by civilians.

Gun Law may also refer to:

- Gun control, a set of laws or policies that regulate the manufacture, sale, transfer, possession, modification, or use of firearms by civilians
- Gun Law (1919 film), a 1919 Western short directed by John Ford
- Gun Law (1933 film), a Western starring Jack Hoxie
- Gun Law (1938 film), a Western featuring George O'Brien
- Gun Law, the title under which the TV series Gunsmoke originally aired in the UK
- Gun Law (video game), a 1983 video game produced by Vortex Software

== See also ==
- Gunlaw, UK video title of Day of Anger, a 1967 spaghetti Western starring Lee Van Cleef
