= Helen Gibson =

American actress

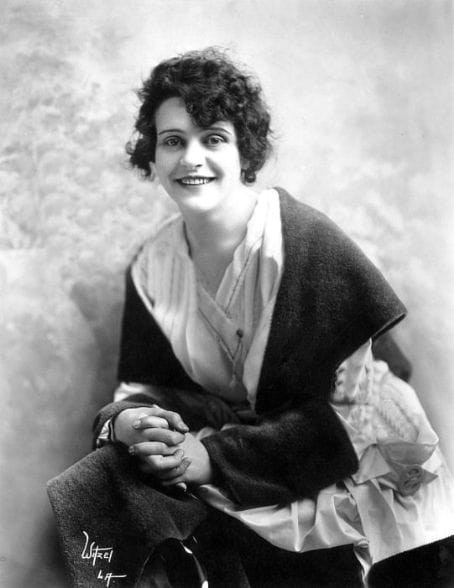
- Gibson c. 1916
- Born: Rose August Wenger; August 27, 1892; Cleveland, Ohio, U.S.
- Died: October 10, 1977 (aged 85); Roseburg, Oregon, U.S.
- Occupations: Actress, stuntwoman, trick rider, film producer
- Spouses: Hoot Gibson (m. 1913; div. 1920) Clifton Johnson (m. 1935)

Helen Gibson (born Rose August Wenger; August 27, 1892 – October 10, 1977) was an American film actress, vaudeville performer, radio performer, film producer, trick rider, and rodeo performer; and is considered to be the first American professional stunt woman.

== Rodeo riding ==
She was born Rose August Wenger in Cleveland, Ohio, one of five girls to Swiss-German parents, Fred and Annie Wenger. Her father had wanted a son, and encouraged her to be a tomboy. Helen saw her first Wild West show in Cleveland in the summer of 1909 and answered a Miller Brothers 101 Ranch ad for girl riders in Billboard magazine. They taught her to ride, and she performed in her first 101 Ranch Real Wild West Show in St. Louis in April 1910.

She was quoted as saying: "(I) was already practicing picking up a handkerchief from the ground at full gallop. When veteran riders told me I could get kicked in the head, I paid no heed. Such things might happen to others, but could never happen to me, I believed. We barnstormed all over the US and the season ended all too soon. I was sorry when I had to go home, and could hardly wait to open in Boston in the spring of 1911."

== Hollywood ==
=== Cowboy extra ===
When the Miller-Arlington Show suddenly closed in 1911, it left many performers stranded in Venice, California. Thomas H. Ince, who was producing for the New York Motion Picture Company, hired the entire cast for the winter at $2,500 a week. The performers were paid $8 a week and boarded in Venice, where the horses were stabled. They rode five miles each day to work in Topanga Canyon, where the films were being shot. In 1912, she made $15 a week for her first billed role as Ruth Roland's sister in Ranch Girls on a Rampage.

Like many of the cowboy extras, Helen continued to perform in rodeos between pictures. At the Second Los Angeles Rodeo in 1913, she was featured in the Standing Woman Race, and so impressed one of the investors that he offered to finance a tour of rodeos for her, paying all expenses and splitting the winnings. At the investor's ranch outside of Pendleton, Oregon, Helen worked his horses every day, and learned new forms of trick riding. In Pendleton in June 1913, she met Edmund Richard "Hoot" Gibson (1892-1962). They began working together, and at a rodeo in Salt Lake City, they won everything – the relay race, the standing woman race, and trick riding, in addition to Hoot winning the pony express race, but the promoter of the rodeo skipped town and they did not get a cent of the prize money.

=== Hoot Gibson ===
That summer, the couple performed in rodeos in Winnipeg, Manitoba, Canada, and Boise, Idaho, and arrived back in Pendleton a few days before the Pendleton Round-Up was due to begin. However, because rooms were almost impossible to obtain, they decided to "tie the knot" as married couples were given preference, and as a result the landlady gave them her own room. They won enough money to return to Los Angeles, where Hoot worked as a cowboy extra and double for Tom Mix, at the Selig Polyscope Company in the Edendale district of Los Angeles (now known as Echo Park). Helen also worked for Selig and for the Kalem Studios in Glendale.

=== Stunt doubling ===
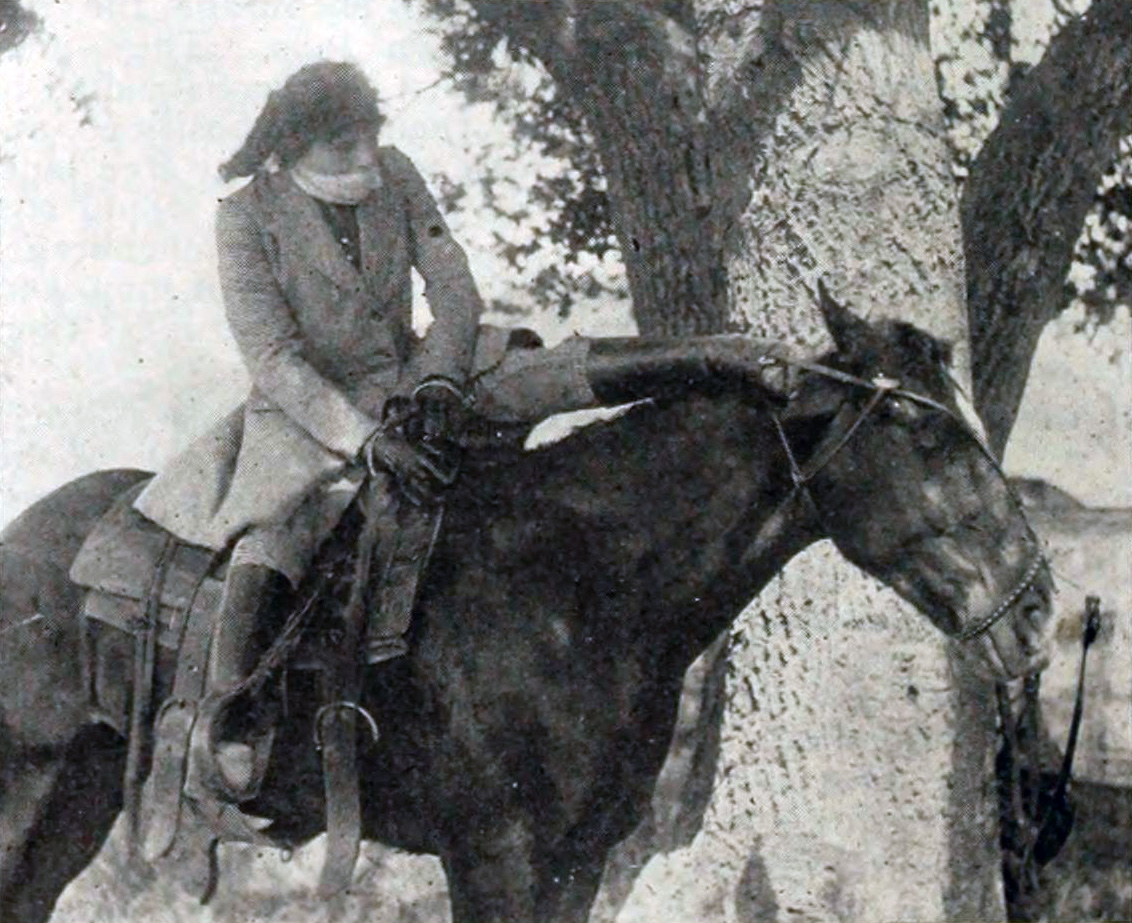
The Capture of Red Stanley (1916)

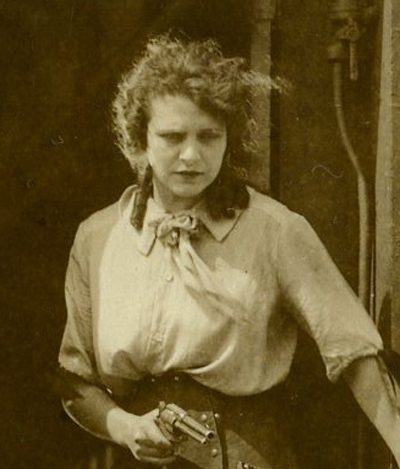
Helen Gibson c. 1920

In April 1915 while on the Kalem payroll doubling for Helen Holmes in The Hazards of Helen adventure film series, Helen performed what is thought to be her most dangerous stunt: a leap from the roof of a station onto the top of a moving train in the A Girl's Grit episode. The distance between station roof and train top was accurately measured, and she practiced the jump with the train standing still. The train had to be moving on camera for about a quarter mile and its accelerating velocity was timed to the second. She leapt without hesitation and landed correctly, but the train's motion made her roll toward the end of the car. She caught hold of an air vent and hung on, dangling over the edge to increase the effect on the screen. She suffered only a few bruises.

"The real difficulty of the stunt lay not in the leap itself, since she had practiced this with the train stationary and it clearly presented no difficulties, but in the timing. What such stunts require is an inbuilt awareness of the speed of the moving object. During the course of a leap where a moving object is concerned, the spatial relationship between take-off point and landing point changes. It is quite possible to imagine a leap from a static take-off point on to the roof of a moving train in which the stuntman aims to land halfway along a carriage roof yet in fact-because of the speed of the train-lands in the gap between two carriages. It seems that in such a leap the safest place to aim at is the gap itself At least in that way one can guarantee to miss it. Helen Gibson had this sensitivity to spatial relationships between objects in motion, but it is certainly not a gift shared by all stuntmen." Arthur Wise from Stunting In the Cinema, 1973.

=== Hazards of Helen ===
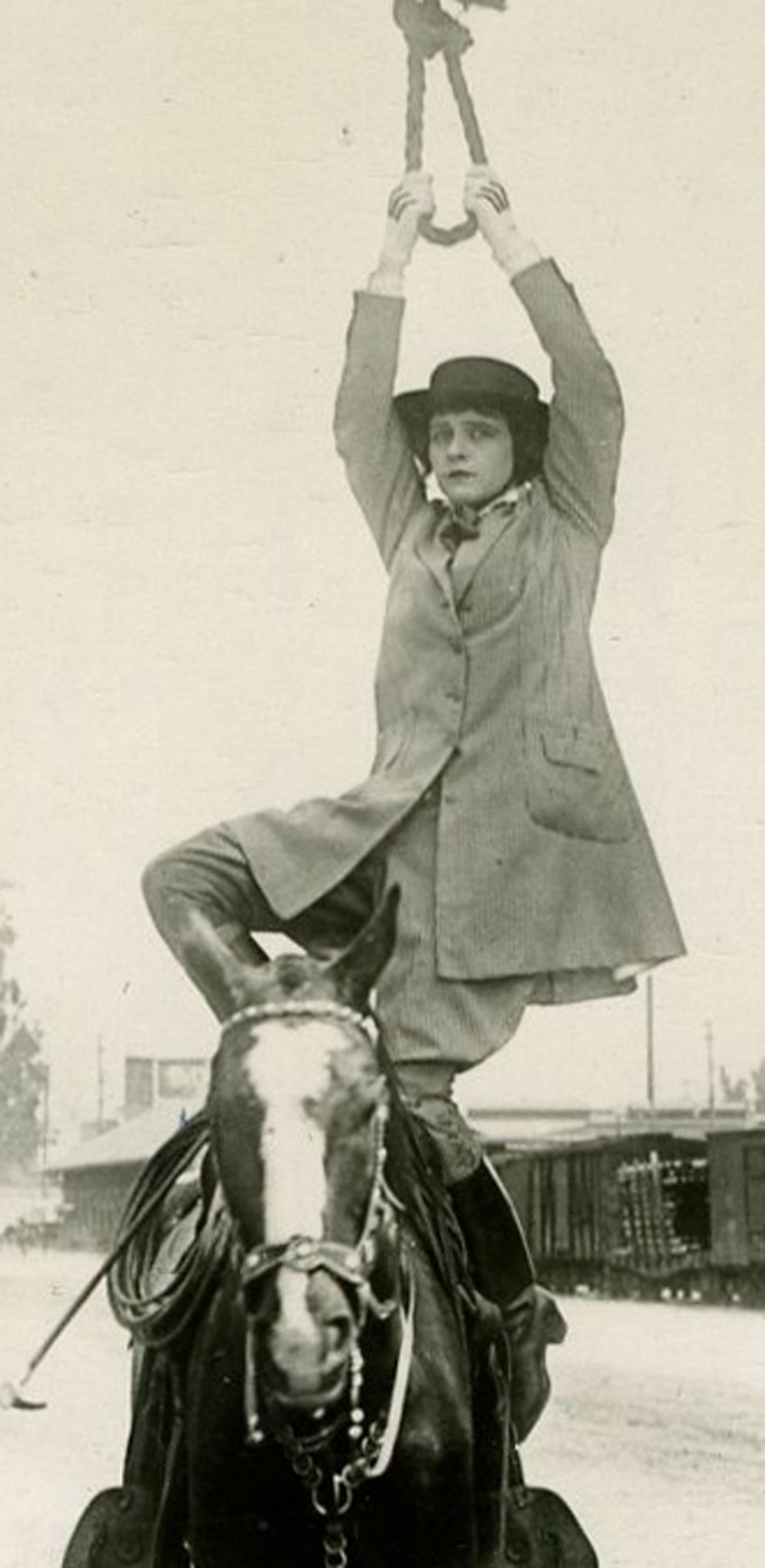
The Hazards of Helen (1916)

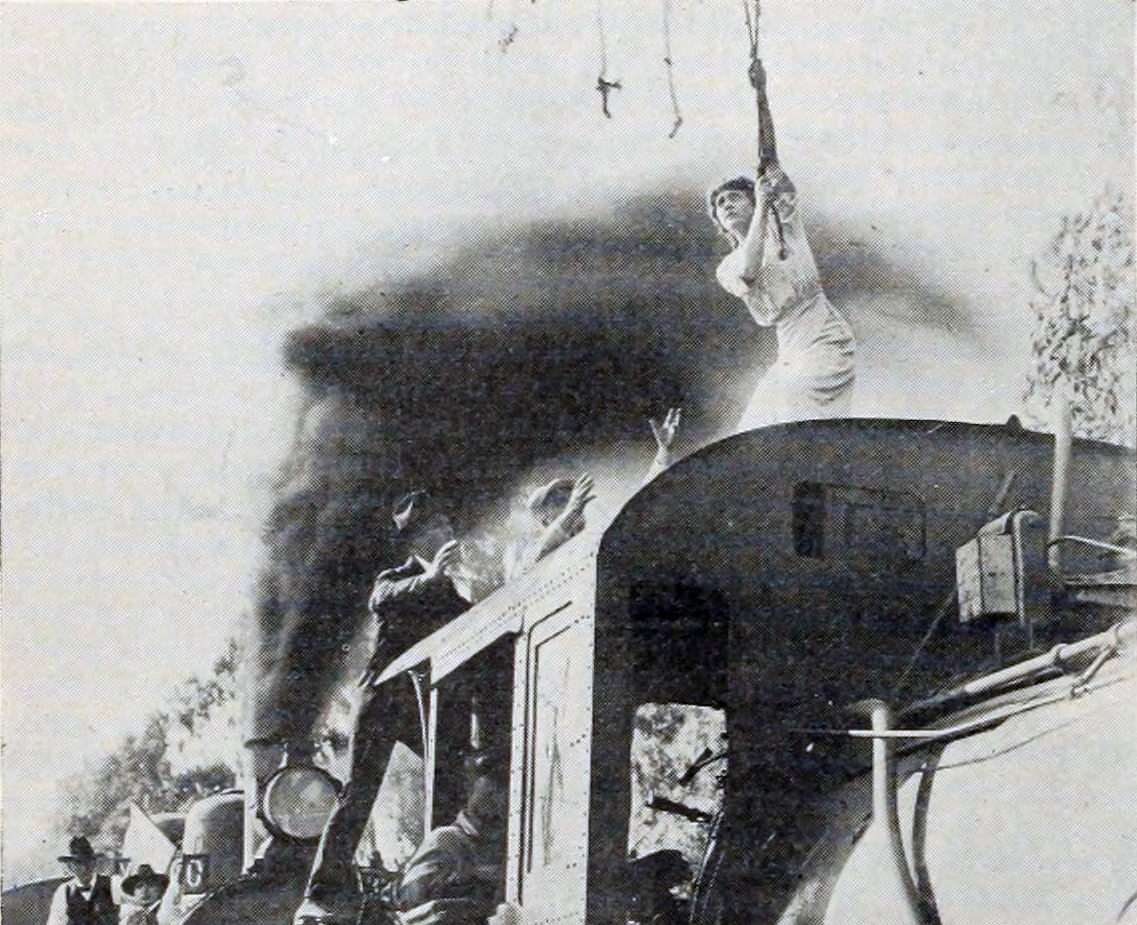
To Save the Road (1916)

Considered the longest serial in history, the 119 episodes of The Hazards of Helen are stand-alone stories, instead of chapters. The highly successful series had begun with Helen Holmes in the lead role for the first 49 episodes, but Helen Gibson was given her chance to replace Holmes for two pictures when she took ill, and starred in A Test of Courage and A Mile a Minute, for $35 a week. The Kalem New York office personnel were so impressed by her work, they instructed Glendale to keep her on when Helen Holmes and her husband, Hazards of Helen director, J. P. McGowan, left to form their own company.

Now rechristened 'Helen' by the studio, she proved to be a capable actress, and after making several more pictures she wrote a story for a one-reeler that was built around a risky stunt. To catch a runaway train, she would detach a team of horses, ride them "standing woman", and then catch a rope dangling from a bridge and use it to swing from the horses and onto the train as it came under the bridge. Kalem rewarded her by raising her salary to $50 a week.

Gibson performed in The Hazards of Helen for 69 episodes until the series ended in February 1917, after which Kalem tried producing another serial The Daughter of Daring, with a starring role for her. One of her best stunts appeared in this serial: traveling at full speed on a motorcycle chasing after a runaway freight train, Gibson rode through a wooden gate, shattering it completely, up a station platform, and through the open doors of a boxcar on a siding, with her machine traveling through the air until it landed on a flatcar in a passing train. The trick was to undercrank the camera and execute it all with flawless timing.

By then Kalem, a producer of single-reel films, was in decline, and rather than risk financial failure producing feature films, ceased production in 1917 and was sold to Vitagraph. Universal offered her a three-year contract at $125 a week for two-reel, and five-reel pictures until 1919; among these were two 1919 John Ford films, Rustlers and Gun Law. Her Universal contract ended with the winter of 1919 and she signed with Capital Film Company for $300 a week, but Capital was already losing money and went out of business in May 1920.

Hoot Gibson, who had joined the Army tank corps, returned during Christmas 1918 and Universal gave him a contract to appear in two-reel Westerns. Census records for 1920 indicate that the couple were living separately; Hoot Gibson listed himself as married, and Helen listed herself as widowed.

=== Producer ===
In 1920, Gibson created Helen Gibson Productions to produce her own starring vehicles. The first was to be No Man's Woman, a Western melodrama about a kind-hearted dance-hall hostess rescuing a rancher's child. The money gave out before the picture was finished, and it bankrupted Gibson personally. A year later, the film was released by another studio with a new title, Nine Points of the Law. In March 1921, the Spencer Production Company hired Gibson to star in The Wolverine (1921). They were so pleased with her performance, they put her on the payroll at $450 a week. However, before shooting began on her second picture, her appendix ruptured, putting her in the hospital battling peritonitis. The studio replaced her.

== Trick riding ==
After her recovery from surgery, Gibson's popularity as a lead had waned. In September 1921, an independent company hired her for a five-reeler and folded without paying the cast or crew. Riding in the picture put Gibson back in the hospital, forcing her to sell her furniture, jewelry, and car. She made personal appearances in connection with bookings of No Man's Woman and The Wolverine in theatres and at rodeos, including visiting her old friends at the 101 Ranch in Ponca City, Oklahoma.

In the spring of 1924, Gibson got a job trick riding with Ringling Bros. and Barnum & Bailey Circus' Wild West show, along with other cowboy performers such as Ken Maynard, and performed in their 'after show' for two-and-a-half years. In September 1926, Gibson joined a Hopi Indian act and worked the Keith Vaudeville Circuit out of Boston.

== Return to Hollywood ==
She returned to Hollywood in 1927 and began doubling for stars such as Louise Fazenda, Irene Rich, Edna May Oliver, Marie Dressler, Marjorie Main, May Robson, Esther Dale, and Ethel Barrymore. She worked constantly stunt doubling and in uncredited or bit parts. As she had in her heyday, Helen became a featured guest at benefit rodeos and events such as the Annual Santa Barbara Horse Show.

In 1935, Helen married Clifton Johnson, a studio electrician who had been a chief gunner in the Navy. In 1940, he asked for active duty, and while he was serving in World War II, she carried on working as an extra and became treasurer of the stunt girl's fraternal organization.

In Universal's Hollywood Story (1951), she was cast as a retired silent film actress alongside Francis X. Bushman, William Farnum, and Betty Blythe, and earned $55 for one scene. Tony Curtis, then unknown, was assigned to escort Gibson and Blythe to the premiere at the Academy Award Theater at the Academy's then-headquarters on Melrose Avenue in Hollywood, where the Hollywood Chamber of Commerce gave each silent star a plaque "for your outstanding contribution to the art and science of motion pictures, for the pleasure you have brought to millions over the world, and for your help in making Hollywood the film capital of the world."

== Retirement ==
Gibson continued to take character parts and extra work until 1954, when the couple moved to Lake Tahoe for health reasons. After trying unsuccessfully to sell real estate, they returned and bought a home in Panorama City, in the San Fernando Valley. Gibson suffered a slight stroke in 1957, but it did not prevent her working as an extra in film and television.

Her last role was in 1961, John Ford's The Man Who Shot Liberty Valance, for which she was paid $35; she was 69 years old. She retired in January 1962, on a Motion Picture Industry pension of $200 a month plus social security.

The couple moved to Roseburg, Oregon, where she spent her later years fishing and giving the occasional interview. Helen Gibson died of heart failure following a stroke in 1977 aged 85.

== Filmography ==
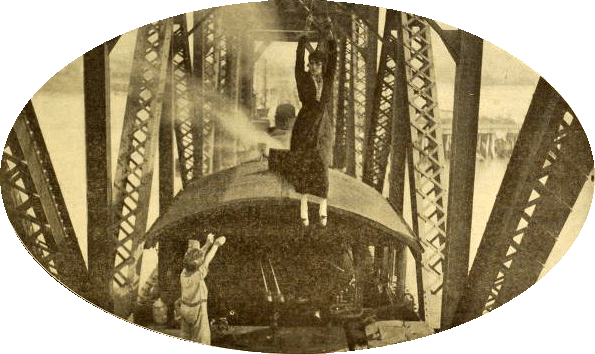
A Daughter of Daring (1917)

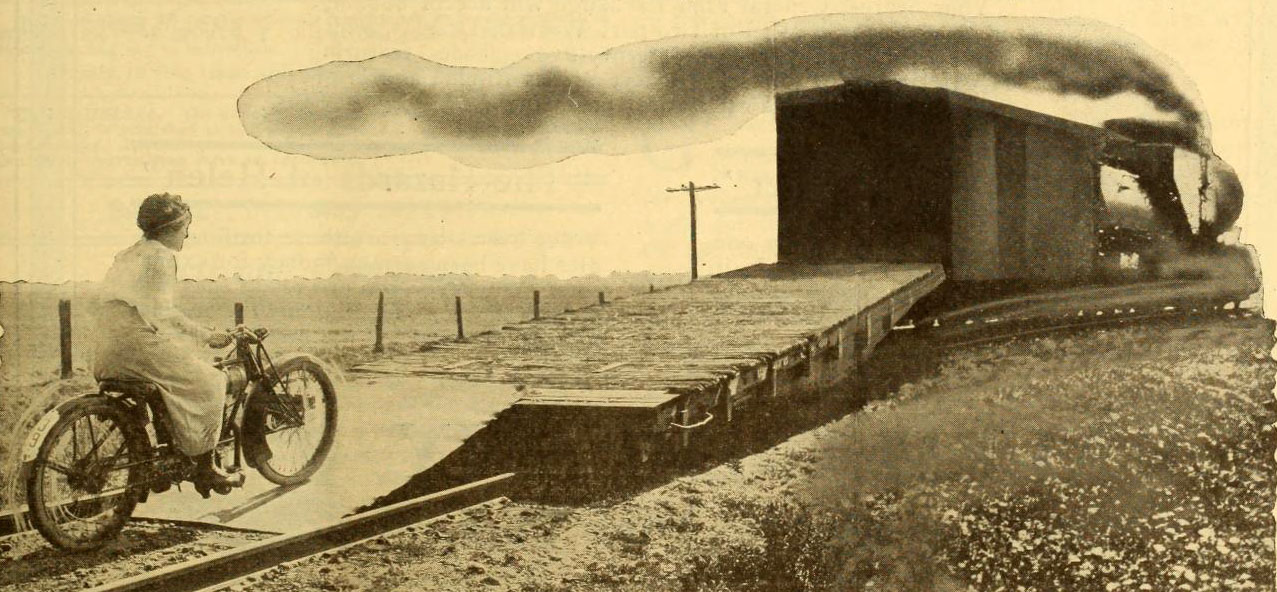
In the Path of Peril (1917)

Year	Title	Role	Production company	Notes
1912	Ranch Girls on a Rampage	Ruth Roland's sister	Selig Polyscope Company	
1913	Old Moddingington's Daughters	Moddington's daughter	Vitagraph Studios	Short
1913	A Girl of the Range			Short
1914–1915	The Hazards of Helen	Helen	Kalem Company	63 episodes, (1915-1917)
1915	Man of God		Lubin Manufacturing Company	Short
1917	Daughter of Daring	Helen	Kalem Company	11 episodes
1917	The Wrong Man		Bison Motion Pictures	Short
1917	Ghost of Canyon Diablo			Short
1917	Border Watch Dogs		Universal Pictures	Short
1917	A Perilous Leap		Universal Pictures	Short
1917	The Dynamite Special		Bison Motion Pictures	Short
1917	The Little Outlaw		Pathe Exchange (dist)	Short
1917	The Girl of Gopher City			Short
1917	Trail Divided		Pathe Exchange (dist)	Short
1917	Saving the Fast Mail	Helen	Bison Motion Pictures	Short
1917	The End of the Run	Nona Durman	Universal Pictures	Short
1917	Fighting Mad	Mary Lambert	Universal Pictures	
1918	Play Straight or Fight	Helen Rankin	Universal Pictures	Short
1918	The Midnight Flyer	Helen Morgan	Universal Pictures	Short
1918	The Branded Man	Helen Ewing	Universal Pictures	Short
1918	The Pay Roll Express	Helen	Universal Pictures	Short
1918	Bawled Out		Century Films	Short
1918	Danger Ahead		Universal Pictures	Short
1918	Under False Pretenses		Universal Pictures	Short
1918	The Fast Mail		Universal Pictures	Short
1918	The Dead Shot		Universal Pictures	Short
1918	The Silent Sentinel		Universal Pictures	Short
1918	Captured Alive	Dolly Martin	Universal Pictures	Short
1918	The Robber		Universal Pictures	Short
1918	Wolves of the Range		Universal Pictures	Short
1919	The Secret Peril		Universal Pictures	Short
1919	The Black Horse Bandit		Universal Pictures	Short
1919	The Canyon Mystery		Universal Pictures	Short
1919	Riding Wild		Universal Pictures	Short
1919	Ace High		Universal Pictures	Short
1919	The Rustlers (John Ford)	Postmistress – Nell Wyndham	Universal Pictures	Short
1919	Gun Law (John Ford)	Letty	Universal Pictures	Short
1919	Down But Not Out		Universal Pictures	Short
1919	Loot	Maid	Universal Pictures	
1921	No Man's Woman	The girl	Helen Gibson productions	
1921	The Wolverine	Billy Louise	Spencer Productions	
1922	Nine Points of the Law	Cherie Du Bois	Rainbow Film Company	
1922	Thorobred	Helen		
1927	Heroes of the Wild	Julia	Mascot Pictures Corporation	
1928	The Chinatown Mystery		Trem Carr Pictures	
1928	The Vanishing West	Mrs. Kincaid	Mascot Pictures Corporation	Serial, Ep. 10 The End of the Trail
1931	The Lightning Warrior Ch. 1 The Drums of Doom	Pioneer woman & stunt double: Georgia Hale	Mascot Pictures Corporation	Serial, [ch 1-2]
1931	The Cheyenne Cyclone	Townswoman	Willis Kent Productions	Uncredited
1932	Human Targets	Mrs. Dale	Big 4 Film	Uncredited
1932	Single-Handed Sanders	Judd's Wife		Uncredited
1932	The Silver Lining	Dorothy Dent	Alan Crosland Productions	
1932	Law and Lawless	Mrs. Kelley / molly	Majestic Pictures	
1933	King of the Arena	Circus cowgirl	Universal Pictures	Uncredited
1934	Wheels of Destiny	Settler's wife	Ken Maynard Productions	Uncredited
1934	Rocky Rhodes	Townswoman	Buck Jones Productions	Uncredited
1934	The Way of the West	Townswoman	Empire Films	
1934	365 Nights in Hollywood	Student actress	Fox Film Corporation	Uncredited
1935	The Pecos Kid	Party Guest		Uncredited
1935	The Drunkard	Betty	Weiss Productions	
1935	Cyclone of the Saddle	Mrs. Carter	Weiss Productions	
1935	Bride of Frankenstein	Villager	Universal Pictures	Uncredited
1935	Fighting Caballero	Drusella Jenkins		Uncredited
1935	Gun Play	Woman at Dance		Uncredited
1935	Five Bad Men	Mrs. Swift	Sunset Studios	
1936	Custer's Last Stand	Calamity Jane	Weiss Productions	Serial, [Chs. 4-7, 10]
1936	The Lawless Nineties	Townswoman		Uncredited
1936	Lady of Secrets	Nurse	Columbia Pictures	Uncredited
1936	Last of the Warrens	Mrs. Burns	Supreme Pictures	Uncredited
1936	Winds of the Wasteland	Settler's Wife		Uncredited
1936	Ride Ranger Ride	Wagon Trail Woman		Uncredited
1936	Roarin' Lead	Adopter		Uncredited
1937	Jungle Jim	Mrs. Raymond	Universal Pictures	Serial, Uncredited
1937	Git Along Little Dogies	Dwire's Wife		Uncredited
1937	Range Defenders	Townswoman		Uncredited
1937	Danger Valley	Nana Temple	Monogram Pictures	
1937	High, Wide, and Handsome		Paramount Pictures	Uncredited
1937	Range Defenders	Woman in Saloon		
1938	Condemned Women		RKO Pictures	Stunt, Uncredited
1938	The Old Barn Dance	Woman at Dance		Uncredited
1938	Flaming Frontiers	Townswoman	Universal Pictures	Serial, [Ch. 9], Uncredited
1939	Stagecoach	Girl in saloon	Walter Wanger Productions	Uncredited
1939	Southward Ho	Mrs. Crawford		Uncredited
1939	Spoilers of the Range	Woman at Dance		Serial, Uncredited
1939	The Oregon Trail	Wagon train pioneer	Universal Pictures	Serial, [Ch. 6], Uncredited
1939	New Frontier	Mrs. Turner		Uncredited
1939	The Marshal of Mesa City	Mrs. Bentley		Uncredited
1939	Saga of Death Valley	Woman at Party		Uncredited
1939	Cowboys from Texas	Settler		Uncredited
1940	Covered Wagon Trails	Woman in wagon train	Monogram Pictures	Uncredited
1940	Deadwood Dick	Townswoman	Columbia Pictures	Serial, Uncredited
1940	Young Bill Hickok	Relay Station Woman		Uncredited
1940	The Trail Blazers	Woman at Ceremony		Uncredited
1941	The Singing Hill	Emmy Walters		Uncredited
1941	Sheriff of Tombstone	Liza Starr	Republic Pictures	Uncredited
1941	Sunset in Wyoming	Fllod Victim		Uncredited
1942	The Sombrero Kid	Mrs. Lane		Uncredited
1942	The Valley of Vanishing Men	Helen	Columbia Pictures	Serial, Uncredited
1943	The Blocked Trail	Townswoman		Uncredited
1944	The Climax	Minor Role	Universal Pictures	Uncredited
1946	The Scarlet Horseman	Townswoman	Universal Pictures	Uncredited
1949	Cheyenne Cowboy	Cookie	Universal Pictures	Short
1949	Outcasts of the Trail	Woman with Boy		Uncredited
1950	Crooked River	Mother	Lippert Pictures	Uncredited
1950	Lonely Heart Bandits	Minor Role		Uncredited
1950	Fast on the Draw	Mrs. Ellison	Lippert Pictures	
1950	Kansas Raiders	Minor Role	Universal Pictures	Uncredited
1951	Hollywood Story	Self – old-time movie star	Universal Pictures	
1951	The Dakota Kid	Woman at Party		Uncredited
1952	The Treasure of Lost Canyon	Mother	Universal Pictures	Uncredited
1952	Ma and Pa Kettle at the Fair			Uncredited
1952	Horizons West	Townswoman		Uncredited
1953	City That Never Sleeps	Woman	Republic Pictures	Uncredited
1953	The Man from the Alamo	Woman on train	Universal Pictures	Uncredited
1954	Ma and Pa Kettle at Home	Ranch wife	Universal Pictures	Uncredited
1959	The Horse Soldiers	Townswoman		Uncredited
1962	The Man Who Shot Liberty Valance	Townswoman	John Ford Productions	Uncredited, (final film role)
