= Ivo Dawson =

British actor (1879–1934)

Ivo Dawson (13 December 1879 - 7 March 1934) was a British actor.

Dawson was born in Rutland, England, UK and died in Los Angeles, California, USA, age 54.

== Selected filmography ==
- The Miracle of Love (1919)
- The Broken Melody (1919)
- The Truth About Husbands (1920)
- Footlights and Shadows (1920)
- The Great Adventure (1921)
- The Princess of New York (1921)
- The Other Person (1921)
- The Money Maniac (1921)
- The Green Caravan (1922)
- Bentley's Conscience (1922)
- Diana of the Crossways (1922)
- Out to Win (1923)
- The Woman Who Obeyed (1923)
- Straws in the Wind (1924)
- After the Verdict (1929)
- The Hate Ship (1929)
