= Footlights and Shadows (1920 film) =

1920 film

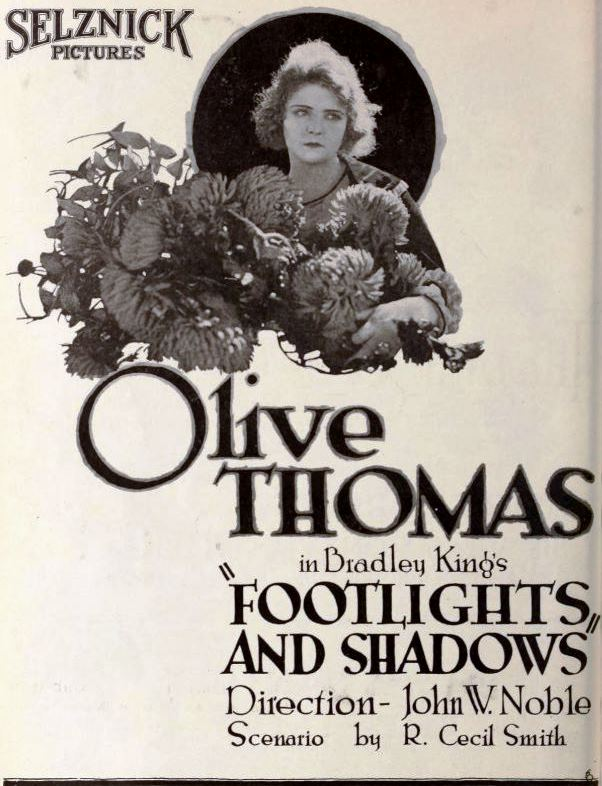
- Directed by: John W. Noble
- Written by: Bradley King; R. Cecil Smith
- Based on: Out of the Night by Josephine Miller
- Produced by: Lewis J. Selznick
- Starring: Olive Thomas; Ivo Dawson
- Cinematography: John W. Brown
- Production company: Selznick Pictures
- Distributed by: Selznick Pictures
- Release date: February 21, 1920
- Running time: 50 minutes
- Country: United States
- Languages: Silent; English intertitles

Footlights and Shadows is a lost 1920 American silent drama film directed by John W. Noble and starring Olive Thomas and Ivo Dawson. It was shot at Fort Lee, New Jersey a major site of filmmaking until the rise of Hollywood.

== Cast ==
- Olive Thomas as Gloria Dawn
- Alex Onslow as Jerry O'Farrell
- Ivo Dawson as Peter Shaw
- Mr. Farrell as Doctor
- May Hicks as Colored Mammy
- E. Van Beusen as Mr. Johnson / Frank Reynolds
- A.H. Busby as Detective
- Robert Lee Keeling as Manager

== Bibliography ==
- Goble, Alan. The Complete Index to Literary Sources in Film. Walter de Gruyter, 1999.
