= Santa Fe Pete =

1925 film

- Directed by: Harry S. Webb
- Written by: Philip H. White (story); Ray Walsh (scenario)
- Produced by: Lariat Productions
- Starring: Pete Morrison
- Production company: Lariat Productions
- Distributed by: Vitagraph Company of America
- Release date: May 12, 1925
- Running time: 5 reels
- Country: United States
- Languages: Silent; English intertitles

Santa Fe Pete is a 1925 American silent Western film starring Pete Morrison. The film is a low-budget independent western made in the East.

This is a surviving film preserved at the Library of Congress.

== Plot summary ==
Warren Randolph (Pete Morrison) is a rancher from New Mexico who travels to Virginia to help a family friend, Colonel Henry Morgan (Louis Fitzroy). Morgan has lost everything, and his property is being sold at auction. Unbeknownst to Morgan, Morrison purchase the property. Morgan's prize horse is stolen, and Morrison captures the thief and recovers the horse.

== Cast ==
- Pete Morrison - Warren Randolph, aka Santa Fe Pete
- Louis Fitzroy - Colonel Henry Morgan
- Beth Darlington - Lucy
- Lew Meehan - Dan Murray
- Lightning - Horse
