= Drag Harlan =

1920 film directed by J. Gordon Edwards

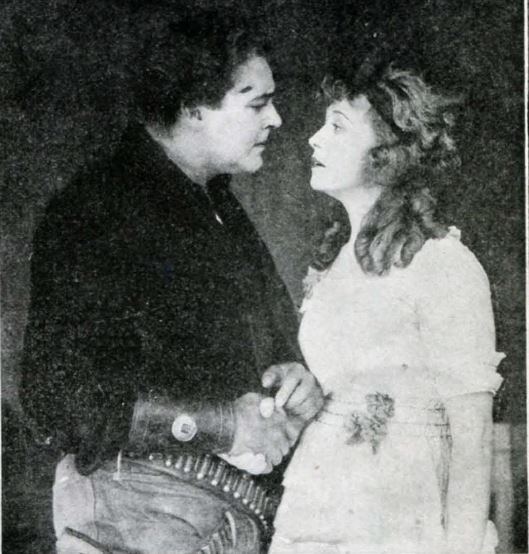
- Still with Farnum and Saunders
- Directed by: J. Gordon Edwards
- Written by: Charles Alden Seltzer (screen story); H. P. Keeler (scenario)
- Produced by: William Fox
- Starring: William Farnum; Jackie Saunders
- Cinematography: John W. Boyle
- Distributed by: Fox Film Corporation
- Release date: October 24, 1920
- Running time: 6 reels
- Country: United States
- Languages: Silent; English intertitles

Drag Harlan is a 1920 American silent Western film produced and released by the Fox Film Corporation and directed by J. Gordon Edwards. The film is based on an original story for the screen and stars William Farnum along with Jackie Saunders as leading lady.

This film survives in a highly contrasted but complete print at the Library of Congress. It was available on VHS from Grapevine video briefly in the 1990s.

== Plot ==
As described in a film magazine, Drag Harlan comes upon Lane Morgan dying as a result of an attack by Deveny's gang, who are after his gold mine. After Drag promises to protect Lane's daughter, Lane dies. Appearing on the Morgan ranch, Drag is challenged by John Haydon. After identification of some watch chain found in the dead man's hand, John is proven to be the murderer. Harlan quickly escapes a near killing and rescues the kidnapped Barbara Morgan, restores peace in general, and wins her heart.

== Cast ==
- William Farnum as Drag Harlan
- Jackie Saunders as Barbara Morgan
- Arthur Millett as John Haydon
- G. Raymond Nye as Luke Deveny
- Herschel Mayall as Lane Morgan
- Frank Thorwald as Meeker Lawson
- Kewpie Morgan as Red Linton
- Al Fremont as Laskar
- Earl Crain as Storm Rogers (credited as Erle Crain)
