= Rustlers (1919 film) =

1919 film directed by Reginald Barker

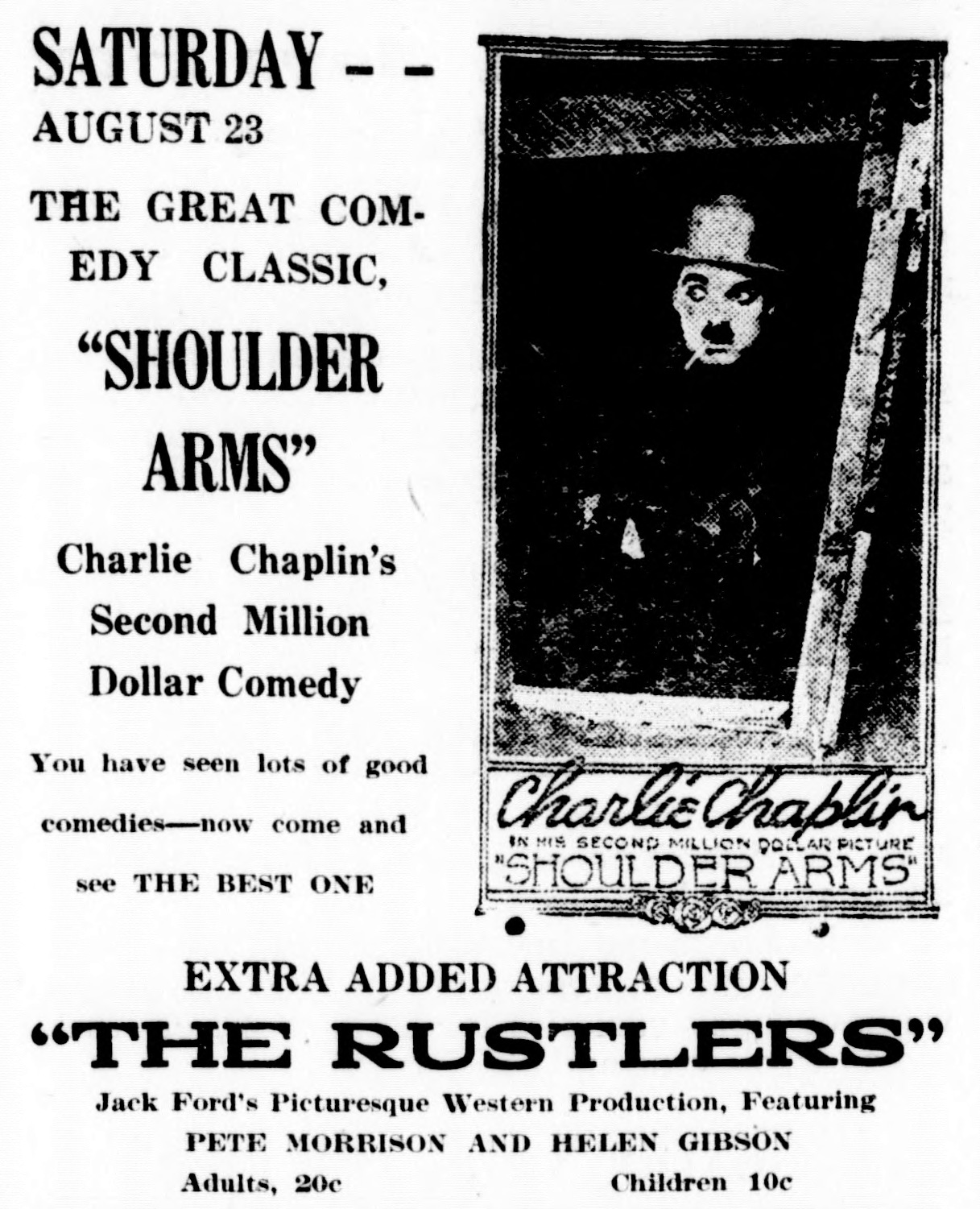
- Rustlers advertised as added attraction to Shoulder Arms (1919)
- Directed by: Reginald Barker
- Screenplay by: George Hively
- Produced by: John Ford
- Starring: Pete Morrison; Helen Gibson; Hoot Gibson; Jack Woods
- Cinematography: John W. Brown
- Production company: Universal Film Manufacturing Company
- Release date: April 26, 1919
- Running time: 2 reels, 20 minutes
- Country: United States
- Languages: Silent; English intertitles

Rustlers or The Rustlers is a 1919 American short silent Western film produced by John Ford and directed by Reginald Barker under the working title of Even Money. The film was shot between February 28 and March 8, 1919, for April release that same year. Ford himself chose to bring Pete Morrison into this project (and others), and during the time of the film's shooting, he and Baker co-chaired a committee created by William Beaudine, then-president of the Motion Pictures Director's Association.

== Plot ==
Ben Clayburn uses the guise of a sheep rancher when sent to the town of Point Rock to track down the leader of a band of rustlers. He is accused himself of being one of the rustlers, and Postmistress Nell Wyndham saves him from an angry lynch mob. The two team up, and using her knowledge of the locals track down and capture the real outlaws.

== Cast ==
- Pete Morrison as Ben Clayburn
- Helen Gibson as Postmistress Nell Wyndham
- Hoot Gibson as The Deputy
- Jack Woods as Sheriff Buck Farley
