= By Indian Post =

1919 film directed by John Ford

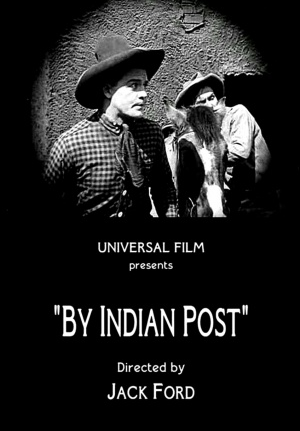
- Film poster
- Directed by: John Ford
- Written by: William Wallace Cook; H. Tipton Steck
- Starring: Pete Morrison
- Release date: May 24, 1919
- Running time: 20 minutes
- Country: United States
- Languages: Silent; English intertitles

By Indian Post

By Indian Post is a 1919 American short silent Western film directed by John Ford. An incomplete version of the film has survived.

== Cast ==
- Pete Morrison as Jode MacWilliams
- Duke R. Lee as Pa Owens
- Magda Lane as Peg Owens
- Edward Burnsas (credited as Ed Burns)
- Jack Woods as Dutch
- Harley Chambers as Fritz
- Hoot Gibson as Chub

== See also ==
- List of American films of 1919
- Hoot Gibson filmography
