= The Three Outcasts =

1929 film

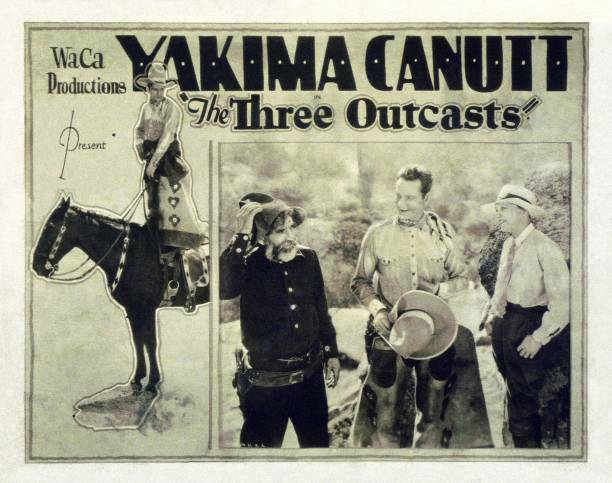
- Directed by: Clifford Smith
- Written by: Gardner Bradford; Enos Edwards; Robert Walker
- Produced by: J. Charles Davis
- Starring: Yakima Canutt; Pete Morrison; Gertrude Short
- Cinematography: Harry McGuire Stanley
- Production companies: J. Charles Davis Productions; Waca Productions
- Distributed by: Bell Pictures Corporation
- Release date: March 1929
- Running time: 50 minutes
- Country: United States
- Languages: Silent; English intertitles

The Three Outcasts is a lost 1929 American silent Western film directed by Clifford Smith and starring Yakima Canutt, Pete Morrison and Gertrude Short.

== Cast ==
- Yakima Canutt as Dick Marsh
- Pete Morrison as Bruce Slavin
- Gertrude Short as June
- Lew Short as Rance Slavin
- Frank Jennings as Sheriff
- Maurice Murphy as Dick Marsh - as a boy
- Florence Midgley as Mrs. Slaviin
- Whitehorse as Nels Nolan

== Preservation ==
With no holdings located in archives, The Three Outcasts is considered a lost film.

== Bibliography ==
- Langman, Larry. A Guide to Silent Westerns. Greenwood Publishing Group, 1992.
