= Jack Connolly (actor) =

American actor

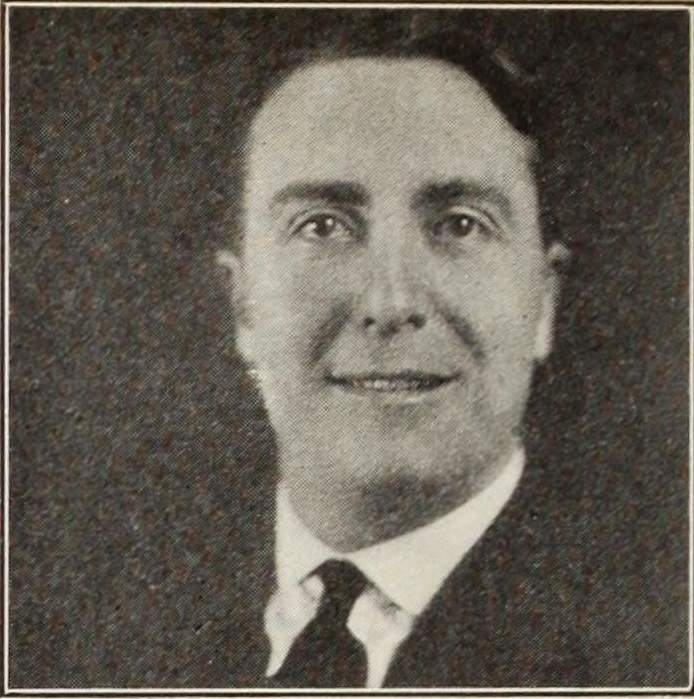
Jack Connolly c. 1920

Jack Connolly was an actor who appeared in many silent films during the early 20th century. Despite a lengthy filmography, very little is known about Connolly or his personal life. He has been described as "a completely lost player who can only be identified by the movies he made." He had a lead role in the 1916 film The Mask of Fortune. He portrayed a wrongly convicted former prisoner working on a ranch in The Wolverine.

== Filmography ==
- Graft (1915) as Ben Travers
- The Mask of Fortune (1916)
- The Decoy (1916)
- The Silent Battle (1916) as James Loring
- Cross Purposes (1916) as John Standing
- A Jewel in Pawn (1917) as Bob Hendricks
- The Mate of the Sally Ann (1917) as Judge Gordon
- The Little Patriot (1917)
- True Blue (1918) as Earl's secretary
- The Voice of Destiny (1918) as Charles Lind
- The Egg Crate Wallop (1919)
- The Lincoln Highwayman (1919) as Mack
- The Little Diplomat (1919) as Trent Gordon
- Shod with Fire (1920) as Tommy Clary
- Woman's Place (1921) as Dan Dowd
- Night Life in Hollywood (1922) as Wayne Elkins
- The Broadway Madonna (1922) as Tom Bradshaw
- The Wolverine (1921) as Ward Warren
- The Mysterious Witness (1923) as Ed Carney
