= The Branded Man (1918 film) =

1918 film

- Starring: Hoot Gibson
- Distributed by: Universal Film Manufacturing Company
- Release date: July 13, 1918
- Running time: 22 minutes
- Country: United States
- Languages: Silent; English intertitles

The Branded Man is a 1918 American short silent Western film starring Hoot Gibson.

== Cast ==
- Hoot Gibson as Sheriff
- Donna Kee as John Ewing
- Helen Gibson as Helen Ewing
- Millard K. Wilson as Jim Calvert (credited as M.K. Wilson)
- G. Raymond Nye as Val Heywood
- Noble Johnson as Trovio Valdez

== Reception ==
Like many American films of the time, The Branded Man was subject to restrictions and cuts by city and state film censorship boards. For example, the Chicago Board of Censors cut, in Reel 1, two scenes of heating iron and closeup of hot iron approaching man, second attack scene on Ewing, three holdup scenes, Reel 2, dividing spoils, holdup of man in cabin, two scenes of taking money in cabin, and shooting at the posse.

== See also ==
- List of American films of 1918
