= West of Arizona =

1925 film

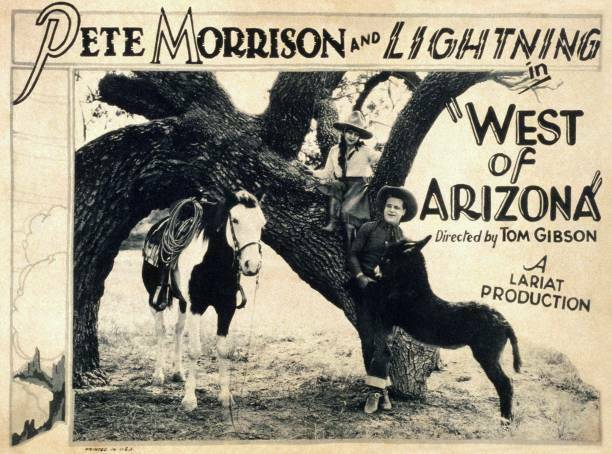
- Directed by: Tom Gibson
- Written by: Barr Cross; Victor Roberts
- Starring: Pete Morrison; Betty Goodwin; Beth Darlington
- Production company: Lariat Productions
- Distributed by: Vitagraph Company of America
- Release date: July 11, 1925
- Running time: 50 minutes
- Country: United States
- Languages: Silent; English intertitles

West of Arizona is a 1925 American silent Western film directed by Tom Gibson and starring Pete Morrison, Betty Goodwin and Beth Darlington.

== Partial cast ==
- Pete Morrison as Bud West
- Betty Goodwin as Bess Randolph
- Beth Darlington as Dance Hall Girl
- Lightning as Bud's Horse

== Censorship ==
Before West of Arizona could be exhibited in Kansas, the Kansas Board of Review required the shortening of the hold-up scene.

== Bibliography ==
- Langman, Larry. A Guide to Silent Westerns. Greenwood Publishing Group, 1992.
