= The Trail of the Holdup Man =

1919 film

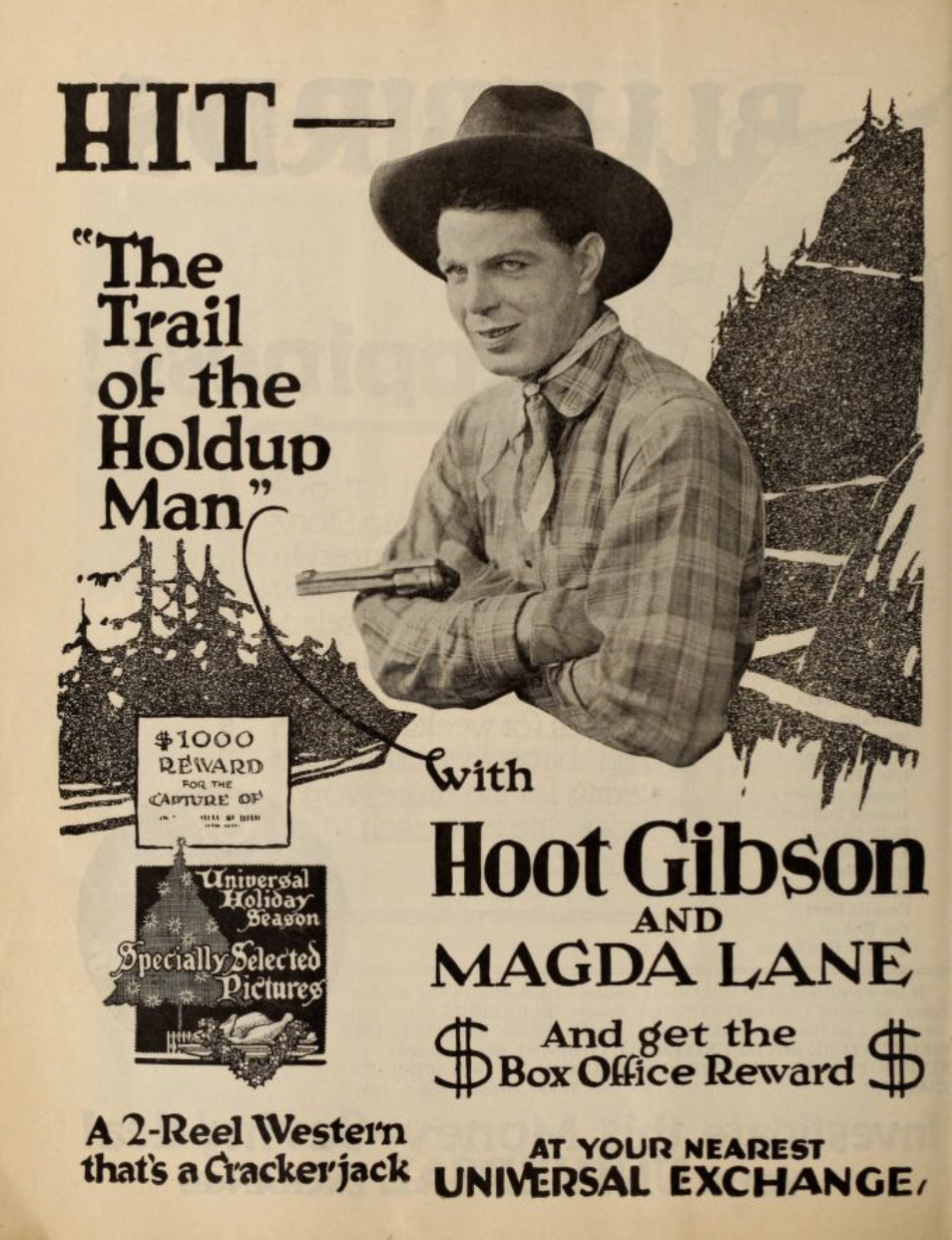
- Directed by: George Holt
- Written by: Jack Jevne
- Starring: Hoot Gibson
- Release date: November 29, 1919
- Running time: 20 minutes
- Country: United States
- Languages: Silent; English intertitles

The Trail of the Holdup Man is a 1919 American short silent Western film directed by George Holt and featuring Hoot Gibson.

== Plot ==
This short summary was printed in The Moving Picture World for December 6, 1919:

A two-reel subject, by Jack Jevne, featuring Hoot Gibson and Magda Lane. The former plays the role of a young cowboy who commits a series of hold-ups near a big hotel for advertising purposes, being a sort of bandit press agent. The idea in this is clever and it also carries a good love story.

== Cast ==
- Hoot Gibson
- Magda Lane
- Roy Watson
- Edward Burns credited as Ed Burns

== See also ==
- Hoot Gibson filmography
