= The Lost City (1920 serial) =

1920 film

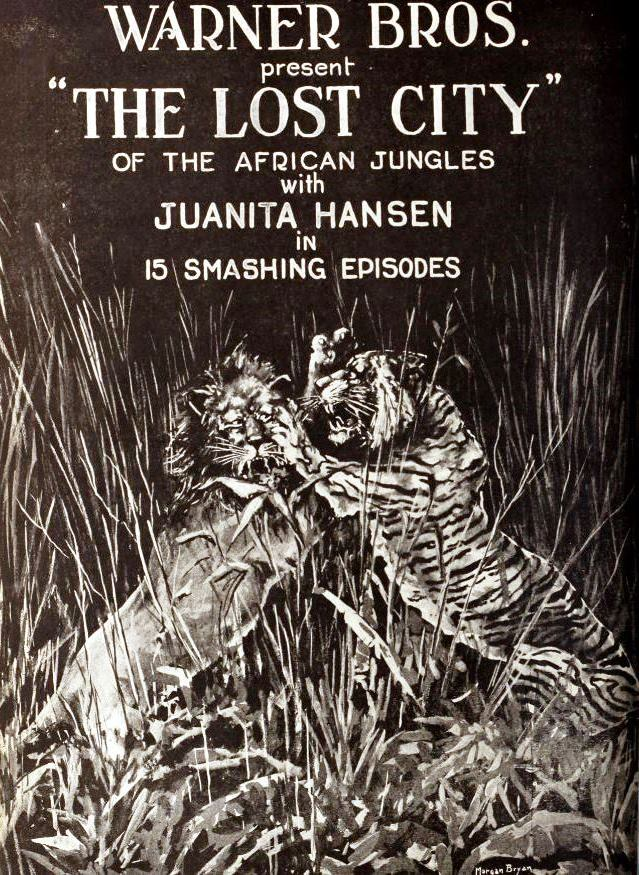
- An advertisement for the film.
- Directed by: E. A. Martin
- Written by: Frederic Chapin
- Produced by: William Nicholas Selig; Harry M. Warner; Jack L. Warner; Sam Warner
- Starring: Juanita Hansen; George Chesebro; Frank Clark; Hector Dion
- Production company: Selig Polyscope Company
- Distributed by: Warner Bros. Pictures
- Release date: 1920
- Running time: 15 episodes
- Country: United States
- Language: Silent (English intertitles)

The Lost City is a 1920 silent film serial directed by E. A. Martin. The film was distributed by Warner Bros. Pictures.

== Cast ==
- Juanita Hansen as Zoolah/Princess Elyata of Tarik
- George Chesebro as Stanley Morton
- Frank Clark as Michael Donovan
- Irene Wallace
- Hector Dion as Gagga

== Chapter titles ==
1. The Lost Princess
2. The City of Hanging Gourds
3. The Flaming Tower
4. Jungle Death
5. The Puma's Victim
6. The Man-Eater's Prey
7. The Bride of Death
8. A Tragedy in the Sky
9. In the Palace of Black Walls
10. The Tug of War
11. In the Lion's Jaw
12. The Jungle Fire
13. In the Cave of Eternal Fire
14. Eagle's Nest
15. The Lost City
