= Kewpie Morgan =

American comedian (1892–1956)

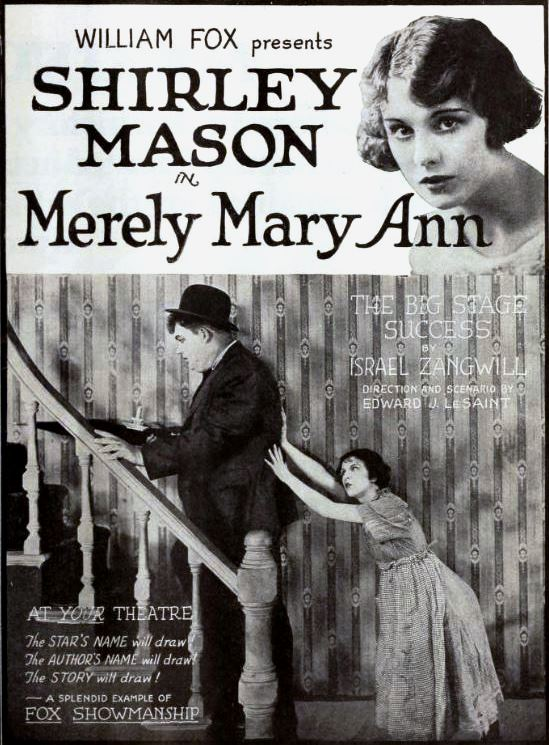
- Kewpie Morgan and Shirley Mason in Merely Mary Ann (1920)
- Born: Horace Allen Morgan; February 1, 1892; Anna, Texas, U.S.
- Died: September 24, 1956 (aged 64); Collin County, Texas, U.S.
- Occupation: actor
- Years active: 1915-1936
- Spouse: Hassie Morgan

Kewpie Morgan (born Horace Allen Morgan, February 1, 1892 – September 24, 1956) was an American silent film comedian who also performed in a few early sound films. He appeared in 99 films from 1915 to 1936. He appeared in the films of such comedians as Buster Keaton and Laurel and Hardy. He posthumously appeared in Robert Youngson compilations of the 1960s highlighting silent film comedy.

== Early years ==
Morgan was born in Anna, Texas, and he attended Baylor University.

== Career ==
Before he became an actor, Morgan was an electrician at a film studio. He sometimes returned to that job when acting opportunities were not available.

Morgan's film debut came in 1913 when a crew from the Lubin company was shooting on location in Galveston, Texas, and the director "decided that he needed a fat boy to play a character role". He later moved to Los Angeles and worked for Mack Sennett's company, Fox, and Vitaphone.

== Partial filmography ==
- The Border Legion (1918)
- Back to God's Country (1919)
- The Cup of Fury (1920)
- Merely Mary Ann (1920)
- Drag Harlan (1920)
- The Scuttlers (1920)
- A Small Town Idol (1921)
- Three Ages (1923)
- Picking Peaches (1924)*short
- Sherlock Jr. (1924) as Conspirator (uncredited)
- Stupid, But Brave (1924)
- Butter Fingers (1925)
- Crazy like a Fox (1926)
- The Better 'Ole (1926)
- Spuds (1927)
- Finnegan's Ball (1927)
- Flying Luck (1927)
- Beggars of Life (1928)
- The Spieler (1928)
- Square Shoulders (1929)
- The Aviator (1929)
- The Rogue Song (1930)
- Other Men's Women (1931)
- Babes in Toyland (1934)
