= The Miracle of Love (film) =

1919 film by Robert Zigler Leonard

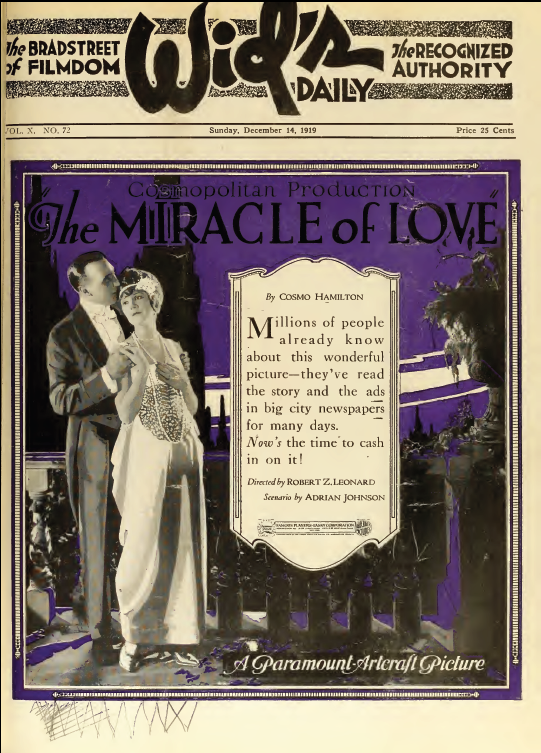
- Ad for film
- Directed by: Robert Z. Leonard
- Screenplay by: Adrian Johnson
- Based on: The Miracle of Love by Cosmo Hamilton
- Starring: Lucy Cotton; Blanche Davenport; Leila Blow; Jackie Saunders; Wyndham Standing; Ivo Dawson
- Cinematography: Allen Siegler
- Production companies: Cosmopolitan Productions; Famous Players–Lasky Corporation
- Distributed by: Paramount Pictures
- Release date: November 23, 1919
- Running time: 50 minutes
- Country: United States
- Language: Silent (English intertitles)

The Miracle of Love is a 1919 American silent drama film directed by Robert Z. Leonard and written by Adrian Johnson based upon the 1914 novel of the same name by Cosmo Hamilton. The film stars Lucy Cotton, Blanche Davenport, Leila Blow, Jackie Saunders, Wyndham Standing, and Ivo Dawson. The film was released on November 23, 1919, by Paramount Pictures. It is not known whether the film currently survives, which suggests that it is a lost film.

== Plot ==
As described in a film magazine, Clive, the younger brother of the Duke of Cheshire, is greatly relieved when the Duke marries an American woman of wealth. He then feels at liberty to pursue his conquest of the Duchess of Cheshire, whose husband's brutality has led the Lady to seek companionship elsewhere. However, the untimely death of the Duke and Duchess throw upon his shoulders the responsibilities of the title and estate. Consequently, he becomes engaged to Cornelia Kirby, an American heiress, and looks forward to a life spent in fulfillment of duty. then a man from America arrives and claims Cornelia as his own. The death of the Duke of Cheshire leaves the way open for Clive to marry his widow and find happiness.

== Cast ==
- Lucy Cotton as Duchess of Harwich
- Blanche Davenport as Dowager, Duchess of Cheshire
- Leila Blow as Lady Emily
- Jackie Saunders as Cornelia Kirby
- Wyndham Standing as Clive Herbert
- Ivo Dawson as Duke of Harwich
- Percy Standing as George, Duke of Cheshire
- Edward Earle as Howard McClintock
