= George Holt (actor) =

American actor (1878–1944)

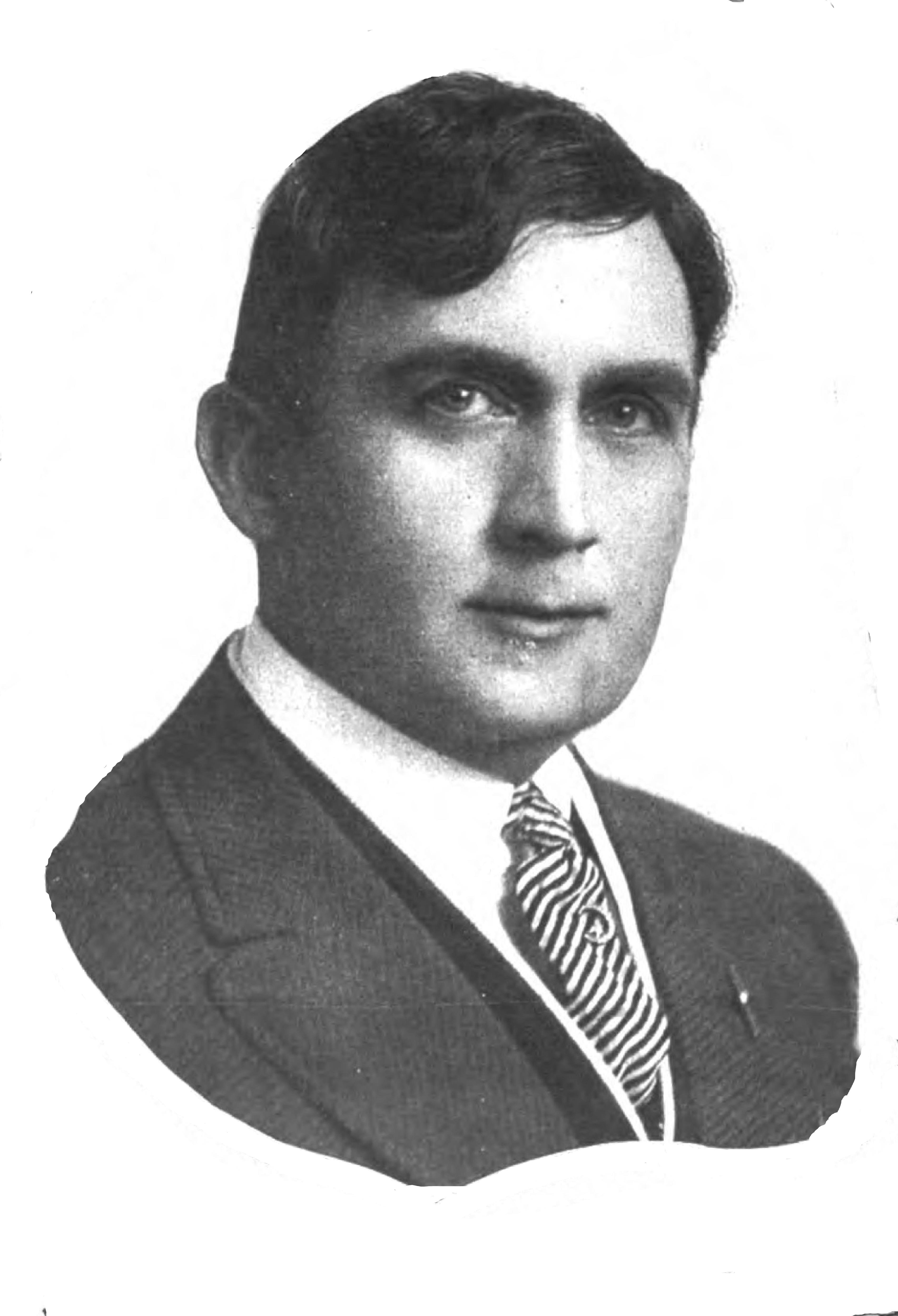
- Motion Picture Magazine, 1915
- Born: September 30, 1878; Fall River, Massachusetts, U.S.
- Died: July 18, 1944 (aged 65); Santa Monica, California, U.S.
- Occupations: Actor, film director
- Years active: 1913–1935

George Holt (September 30, 1878 – July 18, 1944) was an American actor and film director of the silent era. He appeared in 64 films between 1913 and 1935. He also directed 24 films between 1919 and 1924. He was born in Fall River, Massachusetts and died in Santa Monica, California.

== Selected filmography ==
- The Proof of the Man (1913)
- The Fighting Trail (1917)
- Aladdin from Broadway (1917)
- Hugon, The Mighty (1918)
- His Buddy (1919)
- The Lone Hand (1919)
- The Trail of the Holdup Man (1919)
- Kingdom Come (1919)
- Ace High (1919)
- The Black Pirate (1926)
- Bigger Than Barnum's (1926)
