= Fighting Mad (1917 film) =

1917 American film by Edward LeSaint

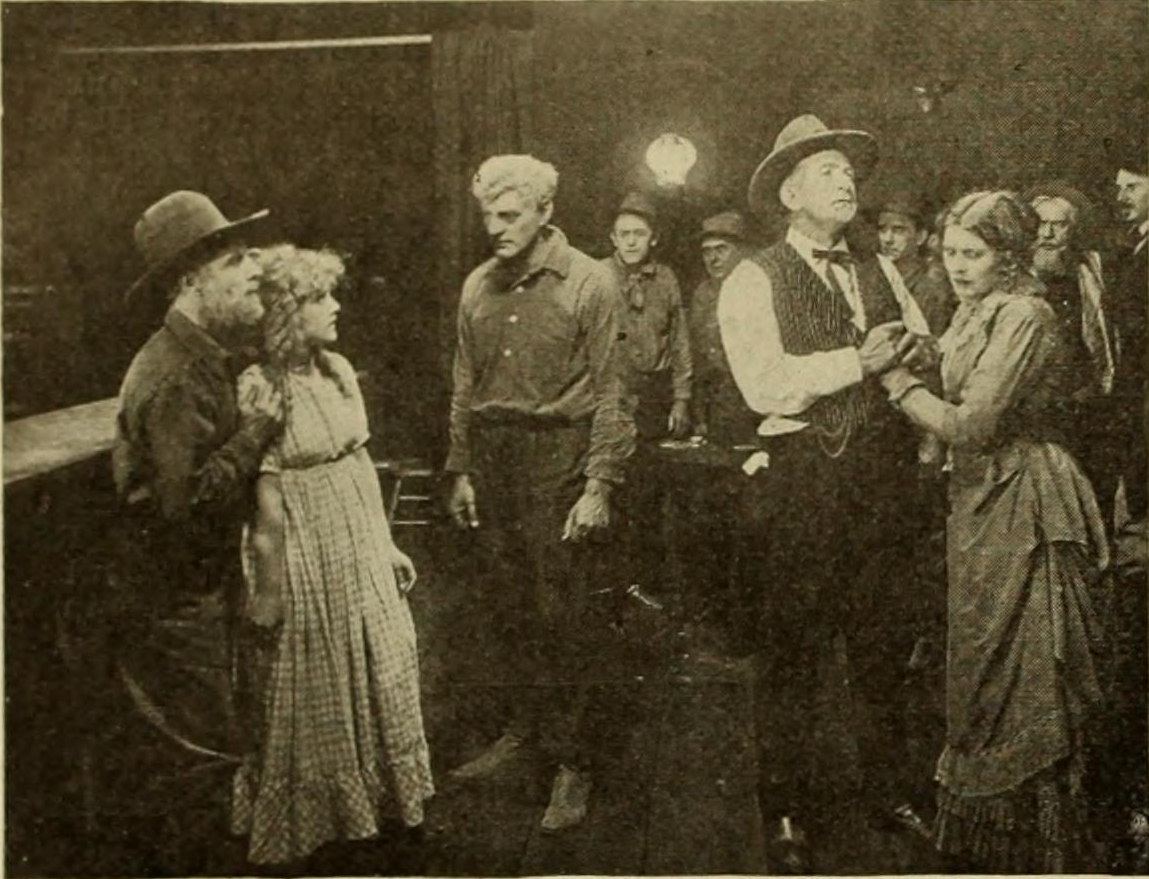
- Directed by: Edward LeSaint
- Written by: J. Grubb Alexander; Fred Myton
- Starring: William Stowell; Helen Gibson; Hector Dion
- Production company: Universal Pictures
- Distributed by: Universal Pictures
- Release date: November 18, 1917
- Running time: 50 minutes
- Country: United States
- Languages: Silent; English intertitles

Fighting Mad is a 1917 American silent Western film directed by Edward LeSaint and starring William Stowell, Helen Gibson and Hector Dion.

== Plot ==
According to a film magazine, "The tale begins with the appearance of the preacher and his bride at the camp of Arapahoe Flats. "Doc" Lambert, as the divine is called, takes a small cabin. The gambler, "Clean-up" Carter, is shot in a row over the card table and taken to the minister's cabin. Here he recovers his strength and entices Lambert's wife to leave her home.

The wife is about to become a mother and such is her general depression that she agrees to leave the mining camp. Later she returns, after being deserted by the gambler, and falls on the roadside. She is taken into a cabin by Faro Fanny, the gambler's dance-hall friend, and dies after the birth of her child. "Doc" Lambert comes to the cabin after his wife's death and is so angered by the turn of events that he almost loses his reason. He leaves the child on a doorstep and begins wandering about the country, hating and despising everything but the cur dog that goes with him.

Years later Lambert, now a confirmed drunkard, returns to his camp. A young girl named Lily befriends the dog when it is injured and wins Lambert's confidence. "Clean-up" Carter and his friend reappear and the former takes a fancy to Lily. The girl is saved from him and Lambert, after recognizing West, shoots and kills him. Lambert experiences a return to his former self-respect and also discovers Lily is his daughter."

== Cast ==
- William Stowell as Doctor Lambert
- Helen Gibson as Mary Lambert
- Hector Dion as Clean-Up West
- Betty Schade as Faro Fanny
- Alfred Allen as Eldorado Smith
- Mildred Davis as Lily Sawyer
- Millard K. Wilson as Frank Baxter

== Censorship ==
Before Fighting Mad could be exhibited in Kansas, the Kansas Board of Review required the removal of several scenes, including the fight scene in the cabin, the dead wife and baby, and both the scene and intertitle where Doctor Lambert is cursing at the naked baby.
