= Shod with Fire =

1920 film

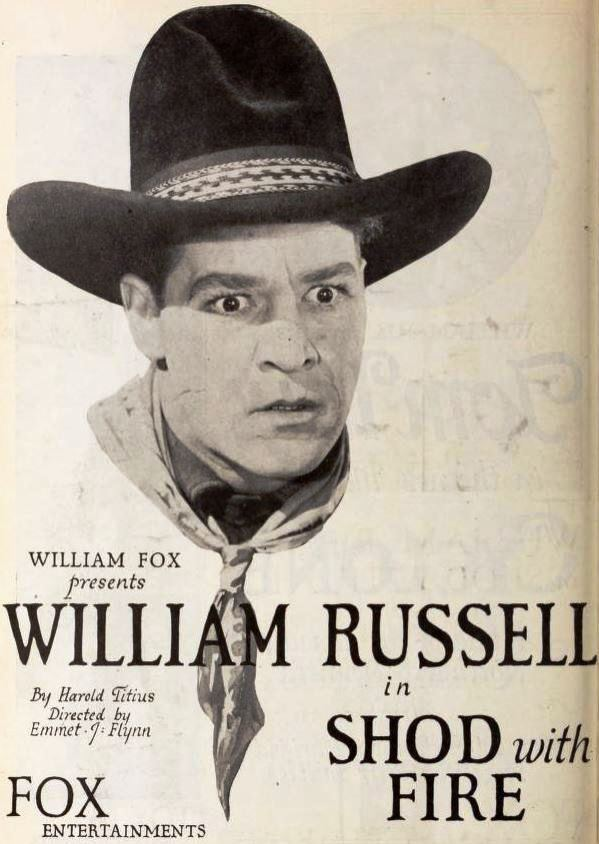
- Advertising of Shod with Fire on page 8 of the February 14, 1920 Exhibitors Herald.
- Directed by: Emmett J. Flynn
- Written by: Joseph Anthony Roach (scenario)
- Based on: Bruce of the Circle A by Harold Titus
- Starring: William Russell; Helen Ferguson; Betty Schade; Robert Cain; George Stewart
- Edited by: C.R. Wallace
- Production company: Fox Film Corporation
- Distributed by: Fox Film Corporation
- Release date: February 1920
- Running time: 6 reels
- Country: United States
- Languages: Silent; English intertitles

Shod with Fire is a 1920 American silent Western film directed by Emmett J. Flynn and starring William Russell, Helen Ferguson, Betty Schade, Robert Cain, and George Stewart. It is based on the 1918 novel Bruce of the Circle A by Harold Titus. The film was released by Fox Film Corporation in February 1920.

== Plot ==
Bruce Bayard tries to help an ungrateful husband, who then accuses his wife of having an affair with Bayard.

== Cast ==
- William Russell as Bruce Bayard
- Helen Ferguson as Ann Lytton
- Betty Schade as Nora Brewster
- Robert Cain as Ned Lytton
- George Stewart as Benny Lynch
- Nelson McDowell as The Parson
- Jack Connolly as Tommy Clary

== Preservation ==
The film is now considered lost.
