= G. Raymond Nye =

American actor

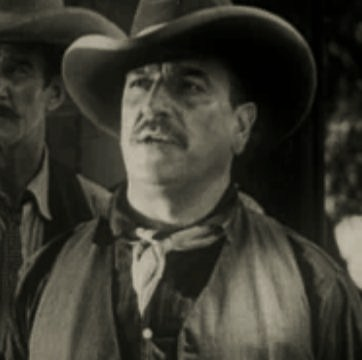
- Nye in Hard Hombre in 1931
- Born: April 13, 1889; Tamaqua, Pennsylvania, U.S.
- Died: July 23, 1965 (aged 76)
- Occupation: Actor
- Years active: 1912–1952

George Raymond Nye (April 13, 1889 – July 23, 1965) was an American film actor whose career began in silent era and lasted until the 1950s. He appeared in more than 110 films between 1912 and 1952.

== Early life and education ==
Nye was born in Tamaqua, Pennsylvania. He attended the University of Pennsylvania in Philadelphia.

== Career ==
Nye was noted for his striking appearance which consisted of dark brown hair and dark brown eyes. After many years of stage acting, he settled in Los Angeles, where he lived with his father, U.S. Grant Nye, in the Sunset Junction section of the Silver Lake neighborhood of town, according to the 1920 United States census reports.

On October 3, 1929, at age 40, Nye walked into his apartment to find his father had committed suicide by shooting himself in the head. He also found an apology letter written by his father explaining that he was sorry for taking his own life and he couldn't "bear this physical condition." At 67 years old the elder Nye was suffering from the effects of three paralytic strokes.

Nye continued to appear in films until the 1950s.

== Selected filmography ==
- The New Adventures of Terence O'Rourke (1915) - Prince Aziz
- The Passing of Hell's Crown (1916, Short) - Chuck Wells
- The Adventures of Peg o' the Ring (1916) - Big Bill Barnen
- Liberty (1916, Serial) - Pancho Lopez
- Is Any Girl Safe? (1916)
- When a Man Sees Red (1917) - Captain Sutton
- The Curse of Eve (1917) - Attorney
- The Kingdom of Love (1917) - Caribou Bill
- The Girl with the Champagne Eyes (1918) - Warren McKenzie
- True Blue (1918) - Hank Higgins
- Under the Yoke (1918) - Diablo Ramirez
- Play Straight or Fight (1918, Short) - Fred Osborne
- The Midnight Flyer (1918, Short) - Duke - Danny's Pal
- The Branded Man (1918, Short) - Val Heywood
- Salomé (1918) - King Herod
- Ali Baba and the Forty Thieves (1918) - Abdullah
- The Strange Woman (1918) - Walter Hemingway
- For Freedom (1918) - Bill Harris
- Mother, I Need You (1918)
- When Men Desire (1919) - Major Von Rohn
- The Jungle Trail (1919) - Ebano
- The Lone Star Ranger (1919) - Bully Brome
- Wolves of the Night (1919) - Slade
- The Last of the Duanes (1919) - Poggin
- The Broken Commandments (1919) - Berger
- Wings of the Morning (1919) - Mir Jan
- The Orphan (1920) - Bill Howland
- Sand! (1920) - Joseph Garber
- The Joyous Trouble-Makers (1920) - Bill Rice
- Drag Harlan (1920) - Luke Deveny
- The Scuttlers (1920) - Erickson
- While the Devil Laughs (1921) - 'Fence' McGee
- Oliver Twist, Jr. (1921) - Bill Sykes
- The Queen of Sheba (1921) - Adonijah
- Straight from the Shoulder (1921) - Big Ben Williams
- To a Finish (1921) - Bill Terry
- Pardon My Nerve! (1922) - Bill McFluke
- Bells of San Juan (1922) - Minor Role (uncredited)
- The Boss of Camp 4 (1922) - Dave Miller
- Snowdrift (1923) - Johnnie Claw (story)
- Salomy Jane (1923) - Red Pete
- The Ramblin' Kid (1923) - Mike Sabota
- Do It Now (1924)
- The Fighting Coward (1924) - Maj. Patterson
- Tiger Love (1924) - El Pezuño
- The Sawdust Trail (1924) - Gorilla Lawson
- The Saddle Hawk (1925) - Zach Marlin
- Let 'er Buck (1925) - James Ralston
- Nine and Three-Fifths Seconds (1925) - Link Edwards
- Driftin' Thru (1926) - Joe Walters
- The Devil's Skipper (1928) - Nick the Greek
- Tenderloin (1928) - Cowles
- The Devil Bear (1929) - Capt. Epsom
- The Last of the Duanes (1930) - Watson (uncredited)
- The Painted Desert (1931) - Bill (uncredited)
- The Hard Hombre (1931) - Joe Barlow
- The Deadline (1931) - Sheriff Grady
- A Man's Land (1932) - Pudge - Cowhand
- Heroes of the West (1932, Serial) - Railroad Worker [Ch. 3] (uncredited)
- The Reckless Rider (1932) - 'Wheezer' Bill
- The Boiling Point (1932) - Nick - Henchman
- The Big Stampede (1932) - Steele's Guard (uncredited)
- King Kong (1933) - Police Captain at Headquarters (uncredited)
- Somewhere in Sonora (1933) - Crooked Gambler (uncredited)
- Murder in the Private Car (1934) - Detective (uncredited)
- Les Misérables (1935) - Jacques (uncredited)
- Grand Exit (1935) - Al, the turnkey (uncredited)
- Escape from Devil's Island (1935) - Sergeant Major (uncredited)
- In Old Kentucky (1935) - Deputy Officer (uncredited)
- The Music Goes 'Round (1936) - Motorcycle Cop (uncredited)
- The King Steps Out (1936) - Secret Service Man (uncredited)
- The Man Who Lived Twice (1936) - Stoney - Fingerprint Man (uncredited)
- Git Along Little Dogies (1937) - Sheriff (uncredited)
- Eyes in the Night (1942) - Hugo (uncredited)
- Eadie Was a Lady (1945) - Policeman (uncredited)
- Where Do We Go from Here? (1945) - (uncredited)
- The Dolly Sisters (1945) - Tom (uncredited)
- Man in the Saddle (1951) - Townsman (uncredited)
- Carrie (1952) - Waiter (uncredited)
