= True Blue (1918 film) =

1918 film

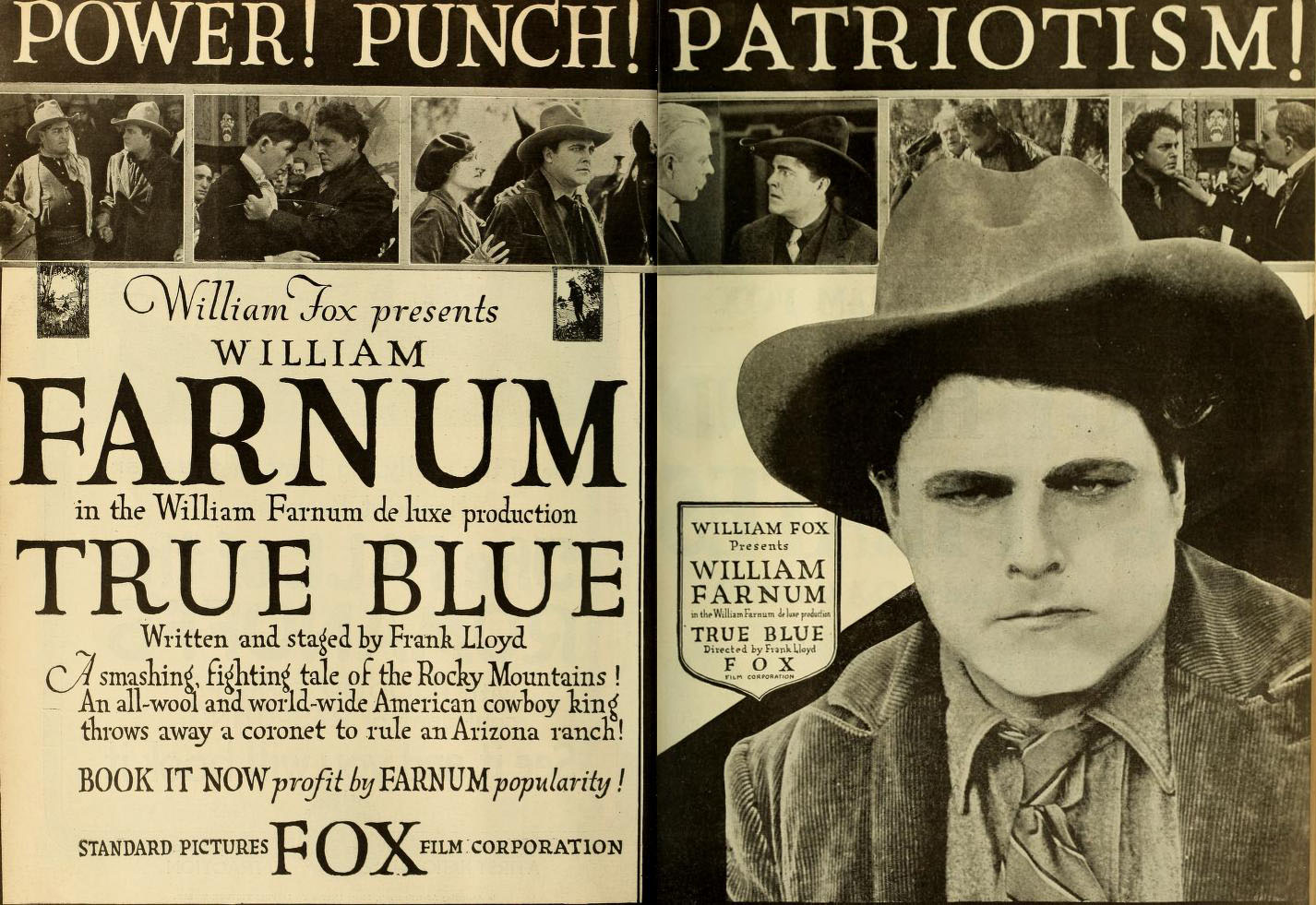
- Directed by: Frank Lloyd
- Written by: Frank Lloyd
- Produced by: William Fox
- Starring: William Farnum; Kathryn Adams; Charles Clary
- Cinematography: William C. Foster
- Production company: Fox Film
- Distributed by: Fox Film
- Release date: May 5, 1918
- Running time: 60 minutes
- Country: United States
- Languages: Silent; English intertitles

True Blue is a 1918 American silent Western film directed by Frank Lloyd and starring William Farnum, Kathryn Adams and Charles Clary.

== Cast ==
- William Farnum as Bob McKeever
- Kathryn Adams as Ruth Merritt
- Charles Clary as Gilbert Brockhurst
- Genevieve Blinn as Lady Somerfield
- William Scott as Stanley Brockhurst
- Harry De Vere as Buck
- Barney Furey as Pedro
- G. Raymond Nye as Hank Higgins
- Marc B. Robbins as Henry Cottenham
- Jack Connolly as Earl's secretary
- Adda Gleason as Mary Brockhurst
- Carrie Clark Ward as Buck's Wife
- Buck Jones as Cowboy
- Francis Carpenter as Bob, as a child
- Madge Evans as Ruth, as a Child

== Bibliography ==
- Solomon, Aubrey. The Fox Film Corporation, 1915-1935: A History and Filmography. McFarland, 2011.
