= Great Diamond Mystery =

1924 film by Denison Clift

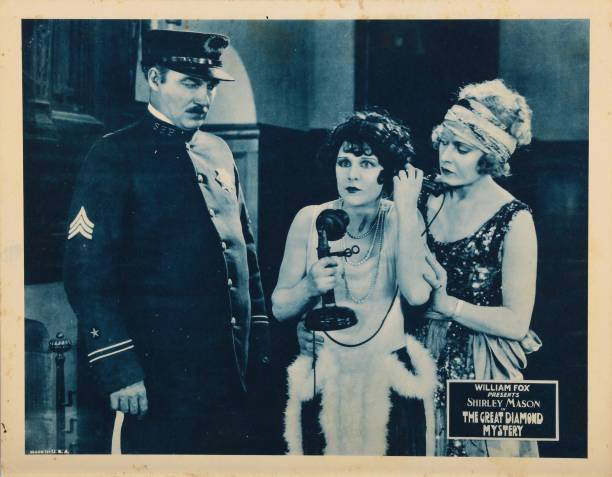
- Directed by: Denison Clift
- Written by: Thomas Dixon Jr.
- Story by: Shannon Fife
- Starring: Shirley Mason; Jackie Saunders /Harry von Meter
- Production company: Fox Film Corporation
- Distributed by: Fox Film Corporation
- Release date: October 5, 1924
- Running time: 5 reels
- Country: United States
- Language: Silent (English intertitles)

Great Diamond Mystery is a 1924 American silent mystery film directed by Denison Clift and starring Shirley Mason, Jackie Saunders, and Harry von Meter.

== Plot ==
As described in a review in a contemporary film magazine:

Young authoress Ruth Winton (Mason) finally succeeds in getting book publisher Murdock (von Meter) to read her manuscript for a new mystery novel titled The Great Diamond Mystery and he agrees to publish it, claiming it is for her sake as the company's committee has turned it down. Perry Standish (Collier), her sweetheart, takes her to meet his wealthy uncle who is so enraged he cuts him off. Mailison (McCullough), the partner in a diamond enterprise with Graves, gives Perry a job and soon after a diamond is missing and Perry is accused. He goes to Graves and, soon after, Graves is killed. Perry is arrested. Ruth is concerned as aspects of the crime are similar to her novel. Believing the murder will return to the scene of the crime, which is a claim of her novel, Ruth rents Grave’s house. The old butler asks for his job and is hired. Mailison returns and resumes his courtship of Ruth. He keeps hunting around the mantels, finally knocking over a clock in which Graves has hidden diamonds. The butler rushes in, there is a shot, and the butler falls. He confesses that he killed Graves for the diamonds. Perry, who is about to be executed for the crime, is pardoned by the governor in the nick of time and finds happiness with Ruth.

== Cast ==
- Shirley Mason as Ruth Winton
- Jackie Saunders as Phyllis
- Harry von Meter as Murdock
- John Cossar as Graves
- Philo McCullough as Mallison
- Hector V. Sarno as Davis
- William Collier Jr. as Perry Standish
- Eugenia Gilbert as Diana
- Hardee Kirkland as Peter Standish

== Preservation ==
With no prints of Great Diamond Mystery located in any film archives, it is a lost film.

== Bibliography ==
- Solomon, Aubrey. The Fox Film Corporation, 1915-1935. A History and Filmography. McFarland & Co, 2011.
