= The Scuttlers =

1920 film by J. Gordon Edwards

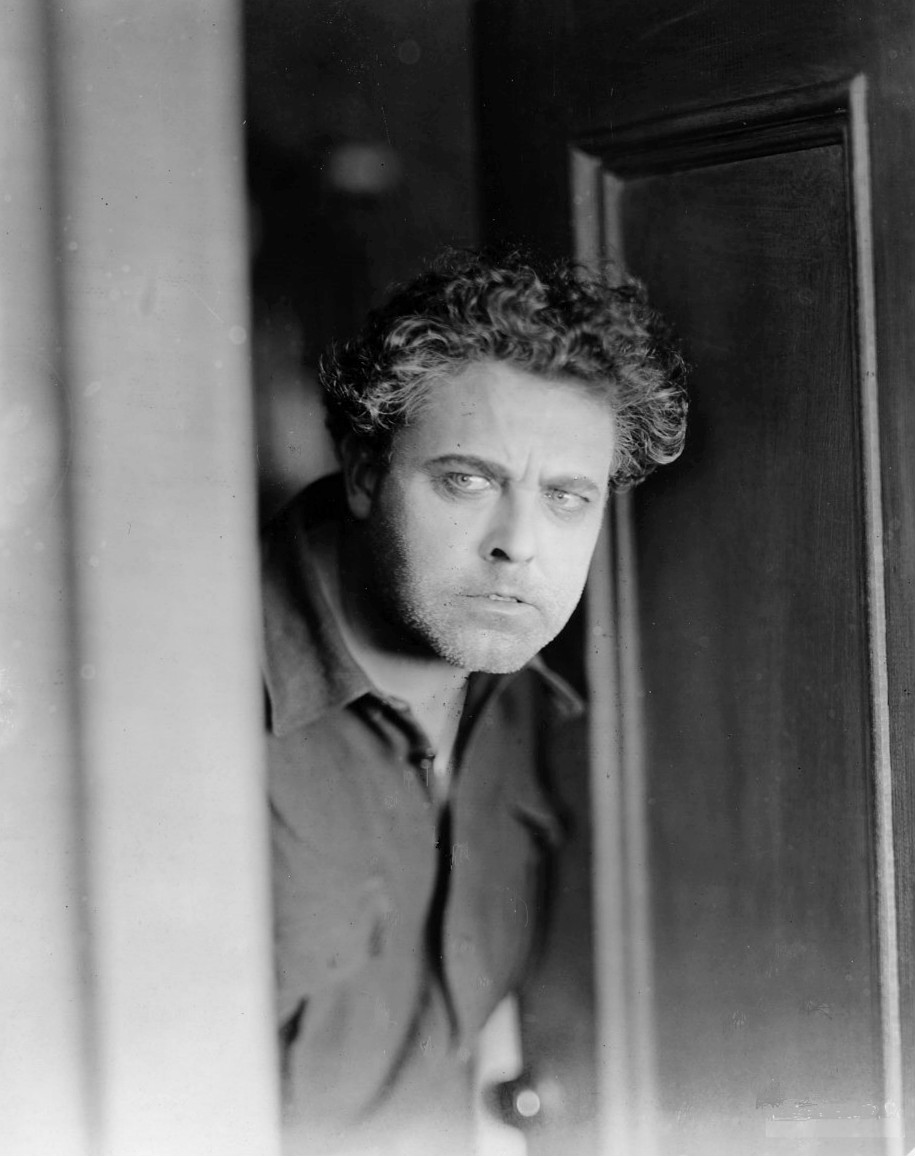
- William Farnum in The Scuttlers
- Directed by: J. Gordon Edwards
- Written by: Paul Sloane (scenario)
- Based on: The Scuttlers by Clyde Westover
- Produced by: William Fox
- Starring: William Farnum; Jackie Saunders
- Cinematography: John W. Boyle
- Production company: Fox Film Corporation
- Distributed by: Fox Film Corporation
- Release date: December 12, 1920
- Running time: 6 reels
- Country: United States
- Language: Silent (English intertitles)

The Scuttlers is a 1920 American silent drama film produced and distributed by the Fox Film Corporation and directed by J. Gordon Edwards. William Farnum and Jackie Saunders star in this adventure.

== Plot ==
Jim Landers is hired by Lloyds of London to investigate Captain Machen who is suspected of scuttling his vessels in a conspiracy with Caldara, a wealthy ship owner. Allowing himself to be shanghaied in a bar at the San Francisco dock, Landers ends up as a crew member on a ship where the first mate, Erickson, treats everyone brutally. On board, Landers meets the Captain Machen's daughter Laura and falls in love with her. When a storm hits, Erickson, complicit in the conspiracy, opens bored holes in the hull and scuttles the ship which begins to sink. Landers catches Erickson in the act and they fight. Erickson drowns in the flooding hull and Landers is trapped on the sinking vessel. Machen and Laura escape in a lifeboat and make their way to shore. Just before he dies, Machen gives Laura evidence implicating Caldara in the crimes. Landers floats to shore and eventually exposes Caldara. He returns to Lloyds a hero and has Laura at his side.

== Cast ==
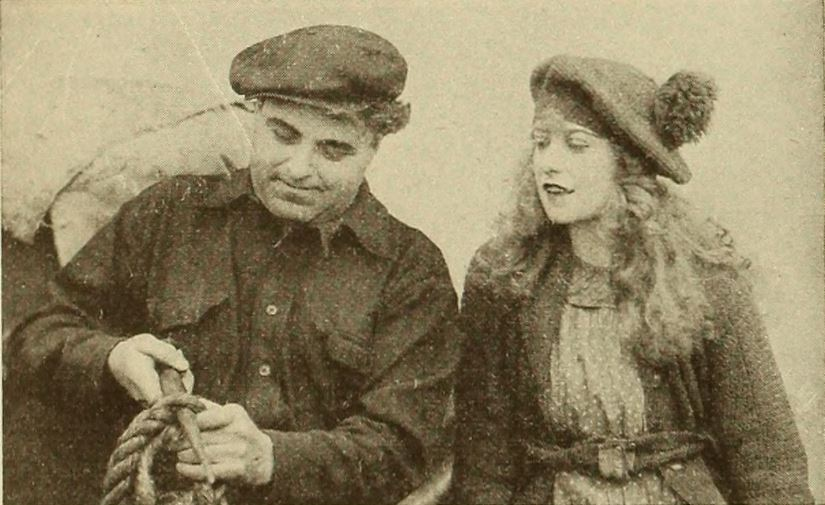
William Farnum and Jackie Saunders in The Scuttlers

- William Farnum as Jim Landers
- Jackie Saunders as Laura Machen
- Herschel Mayall as Captain Machen
- G. Raymond Nye as Erickson
- Arthur Millett as Lindquist
- Harry Spingler as George Pitts
- Manuel R. Ojeda as Raymond Caldara
- Earl Crain as Don Enrico Ruiz (credited as Erle Crane)
- Kewpie Morgan as The Cook
- Claire de Lorez as Senorita Juanita Bonneller
- Al Fremont as Rosen

== Preservation ==
It is unknown whether the film survives as no copies have been located, likely lost.

== See also ==
- 1937 Fox vault fire
