= The Midnight Flyer =

1918 film

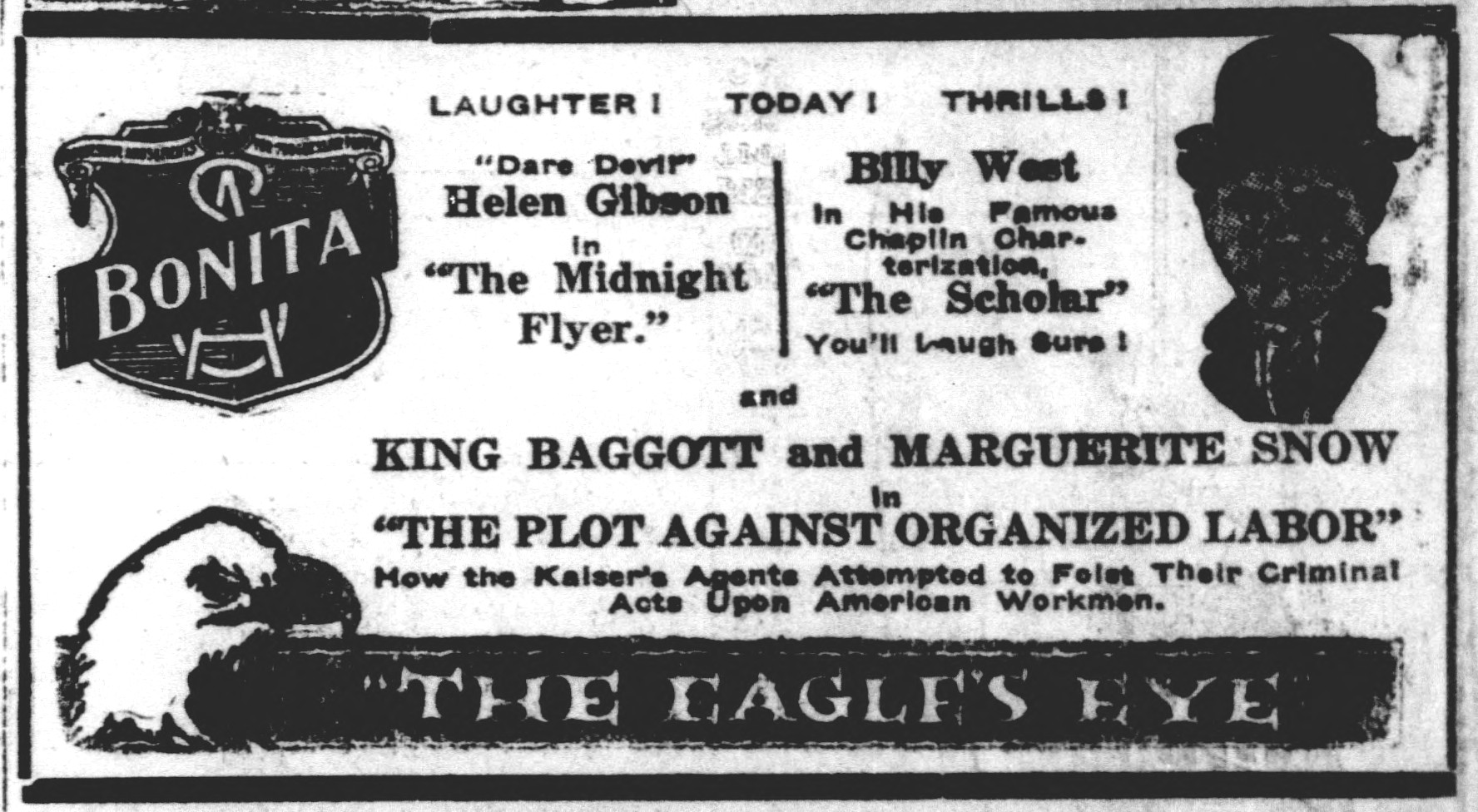
- An advertisement for The Midnight Flyer and other films
- Directed by: George Marshall
- Starring: Hoot Gibson
- Distributed by: Universal Film Manufacturing Company
- Release date: June 29, 1918
- Running time: 20 minutes
- Country: United States
- Language: Silent (English intertitles)

The Midnight Flyer is a 1918 American short action drama film directed by George Marshall and starring Hoot Gibson.

== Cast ==
- Hoot Gibson
- Violet Mersereau
- Helen Gibson
- G. Raymond Nye

== Reception ==
Like many American films of the time, The Midnight Flyer was subject to cuts by city and state film censorship boards. For example, the Chicago Board of Censors required a cut, in Reel 2, of the note reading "Danny will be gone Tuesday", three scenes of young women at a bar, the intertitle "I've come to kill you", and the shooting scene.

== See also ==
- Hoot Gibson filmography
