= Pete Morrison =

American actor

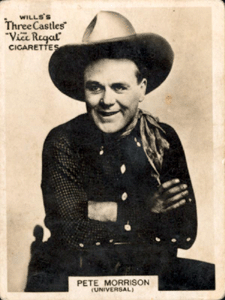
- Born: George D. Morrison; August 8, 1890
- Died: February 5, 1973 (aged 82)

George D. "Pete" Morrison (August 8, 1890 – February 5, 1973) was an American silent western film actor born in Westminster, Colorado. During his childhood he lived in Morrison, Colorado (named for his grandfather George Morrison) and Idaho Springs, and got his early tastes of horsemanship riding with his father Thomas during the summer. They drove cattle and sheep from the summer ranges in Middle Park and Fall River in Colorado to supply beef and mutton to the mining camps of Georgetown, Idaho Springs, Nevadaville, Black Hawk and Central City. During his mid-teens Pete worked in the mining industry, with his older brothers driving in sections of the Argo Tunnel where Pete was a motorman, hoist operator, topside helper, teamster hauler, assisting several of the larger miners in the Idaho Springs area. In the summer of 1910 Pete Morrison was an engine fireman for the Colorado and Southern Railway when he was lured away by the early western movies. Pete began working as a stunt man for the Essanay Studios of Broncho Billy films, soon discovering he could make more money working in movies in two weeks than he could make working for a month on the railroad. Pete followed his older brother Chick Morrison to California, where he also became a star in early western pictures. Through his career, Morrison transcended from very early film in 1909 to sound in 1935 starring in some 132 pictures.

== Film career ==
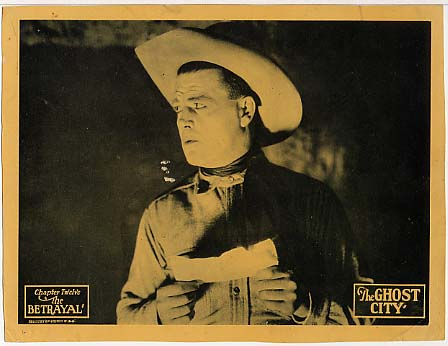

Pete Morrison began work with the American Film Manufacturing Company, but soon was signed by Universal Studios and appeared in western serials and short films. Over time Morrison worked with many of the famous actors of his time, including Tom Mix, Wallace, Noah Beery and John Barry. He starred with Charlotte Burton in films such as The Bruiser in 1916. He took some time away from movies to travel the country in a Wild West Show, then returned and did numerous Westerns for Triangle and Universal. He agreed to make a series of pictures in Central and South America, but eventually returned to Universal. With the arrival of sound pictures, his career declined somewhat and he went into supporting roles in movies, then retired in 1935, aged 45. He appeared inScarface, Cleopatra, and The Big Trail where he met a young newcomer who happened to share his last name, Marion "Duke" Morrison, and reputedly taught the rising star Morrison some of his moves. The younger Morrison later gained fame as John Wayne.

== Retirement from acting, later career, and death ==
In 1935 Pete Morrison retired and settled on his ranch near Golden, Colorado which he had purchased in 1926. There he lived with his family including wife Lillian (née Knapp) whom he married in 1912, and sons Clifford E. and Douglas K. Morrison. Pete became a deputy sheriff of Jefferson County, Colorado in 1936, and remained so for 37 years. He was also a member of the Golden Masonic Lodge, the Genesee Group and Jefferson County Sheriff's Posse. He ranched and farmed along with several outside jobs until his final retirement in the early 1960s. Pete Morrison died in Los Angeles, California on February 5, 1973, of an abdominal aneurysm at the age of 82. He is buried in the Golden Cemetery, along with other members of his family.

The Pete Morrison Collection of his movie career paraphernalia now resides at the Golden Landmarks Association in Golden, Colorado. Pete's career is featured in a historic mural near Bear Creek Avenue in Morrison, Colorado, as well as in a book about Essanay Studios.

== Selected filmography ==
Year	Title	Role	Notes
1919	Kingdom Come		
1919	By Indian Post	Jode MacWilliams	
1919	The Gun Packer	"Pearl Handle" Wiley	
1919	Gun Law	Dick Allen	
1919	Rustlers	Ben Clayburn	
1919	Ace High		
1919	His Buddy		
1919	The Fighting Brothers	Sheriff Pete Larkin	
1919	The Black Horse Bandit		
1921	Headin' North	Bob Ryan	
1923	The Ghost City	Laughing Larry Newton	
1924	Black Gold		
1925	Santa Fe Pete	Warren Randolph, aka Santa Fe Pete	
1925	West of Arizona	Bud West	
1929	Courtin' Wildcats	Huxley	
1929	The Three Outcasts	Bruce Slavin	
1929	Bucking the Truth	'Slim' Duane	
1929	The Escape	Johnny Bowers	
1929	Chasing Trouble	Ballard	
1929	The Desperate Game	Jim Wesley	
1929	Blue Blazes	Dee Halloran	
1930	Beyond the Rio Grande	Al Mooney	
1930	Westward Bound	Rustler	
1930	The Phantom of the Desert	Jim	
1932	Outlaw Justice	Henchman	
1935	Five Bad Men	Bad man	

The Golden Landmarks Association offers a more complete list of his films, said to number between 132 and 204 in total. Many were produced at his own studio, Lariat Productions, at Universal Studios.
