= The Wolverine (1921 film) =

1921 film

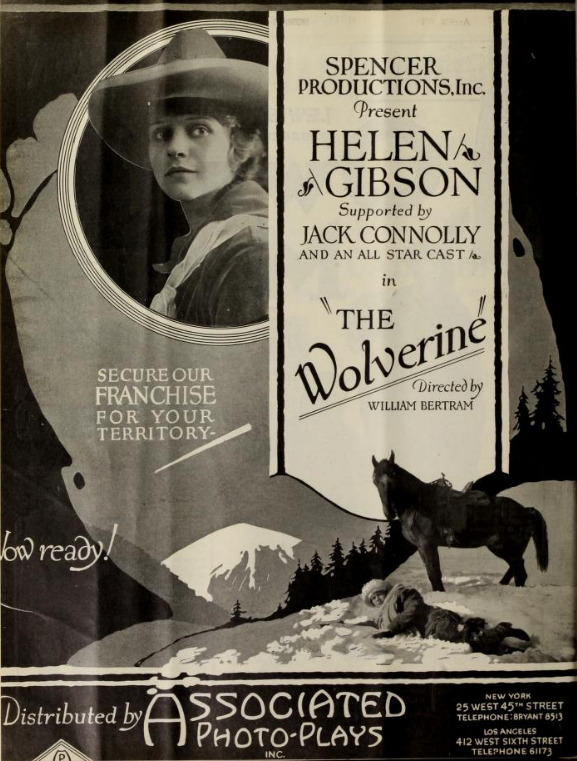
- Advertisement
- Directed by: William Bertram
- Written by: Bertha Muzzy Sinclair (novel); Helen van Upp
- Starring: Helen Gibson; Jack Connolly; Leo D. Maloney
- Cinematography: Stephen S. Norton
- Production company: Spencer Productions
- Distributed by: Associated Photoplays
- Release date: September 23, 1921
- Running time: 50 minutes
- Country: United States
- Languages: Silent; English intertitles

The Wolverine is a 1921 American silent Western film directed by William Bertram and starring Helen Gibson, Jack Connolly and Leo D. Maloney.

== Cast ==
- Helen Gibson as Billy Louise
- Jack Connolly as Ward Warren
- Leo D. Maloney as Charlie Fox
- Ivor McFadden as Buck Olney
- Anne Schaefer as Martha Meilke
- Gus Saville as Jase Meilk

== Bibliography ==
- Connelly, Robert B. The Silents: Silent Feature Films, 1910-36, Volume 40, Issue 2. December Press, 1998.
- Munden, Kenneth White. The American Film Institute Catalog of Motion Pictures Produced in the United States, Part 1. University of California Press, 1997.
