= Jackie Saunders =

American actress

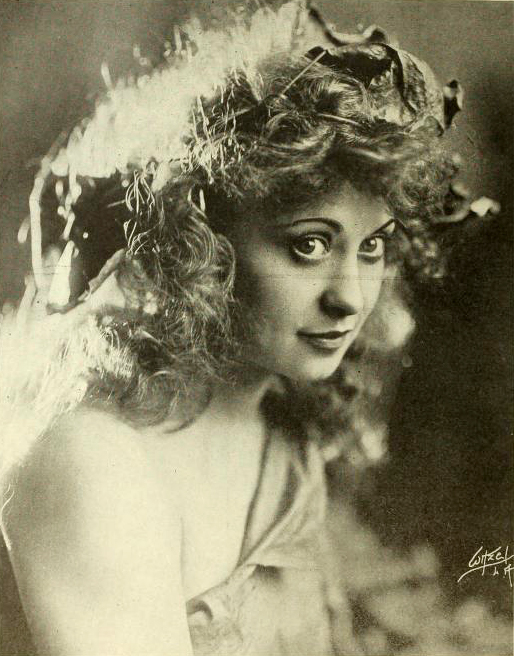
- Saunders in 1919
- Born: Anna Jacqueline Jaekel; October 6, 1892; Philadelphia, Pennsylvania, U.S.
- Died: July 14, 1954 (aged 61); Palm Springs, California, U.S.
- Resting place: Welwood Memorial Cemetery, Palm Springs, California
- Other name: Jacqueline Saunders
- Years active: 1911–1925
- Spouse(s): Elwood D. Horkheimer (1916–1920) 1 daughter J. Ward Cohen (1927–1951) 1 daughter

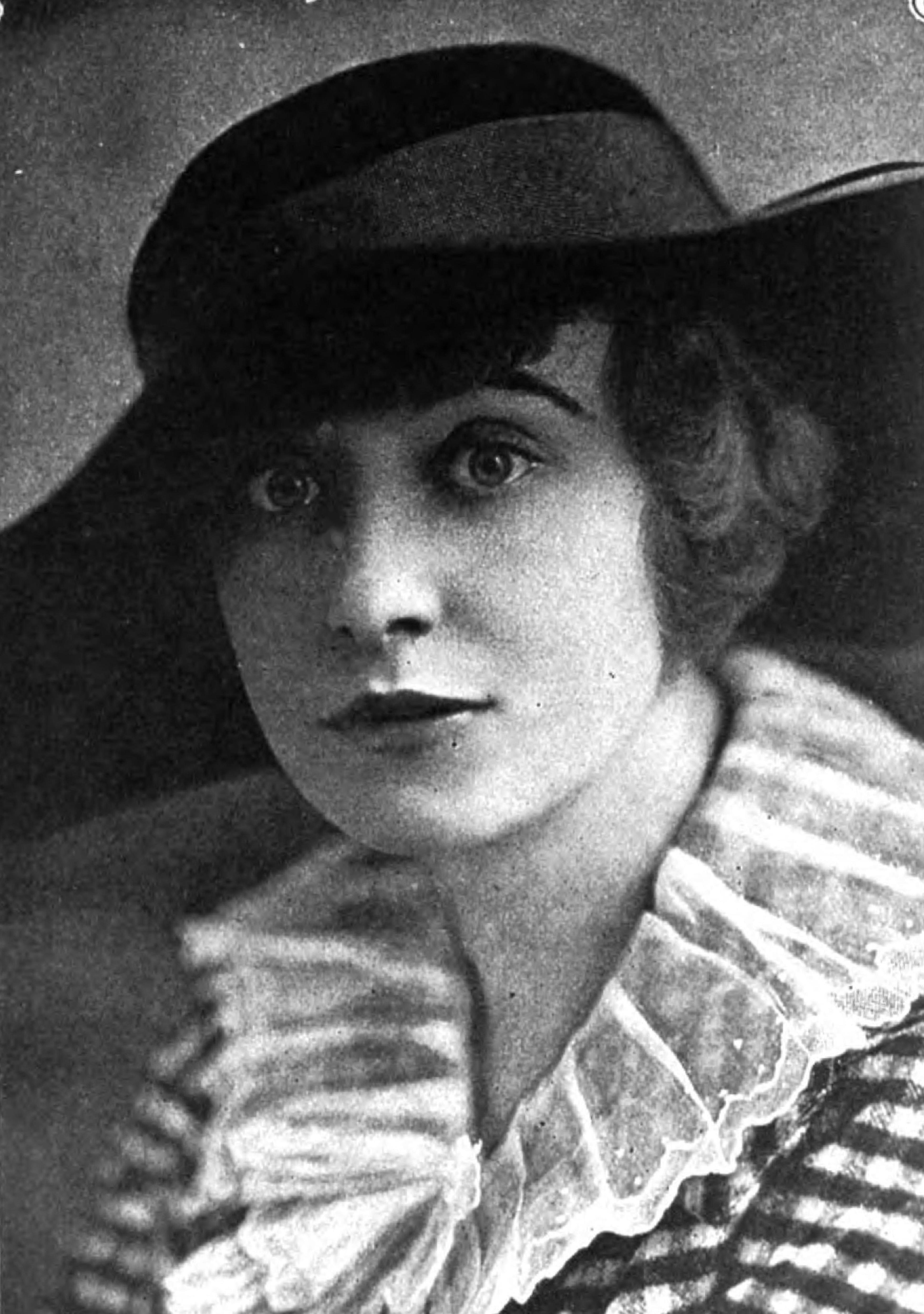

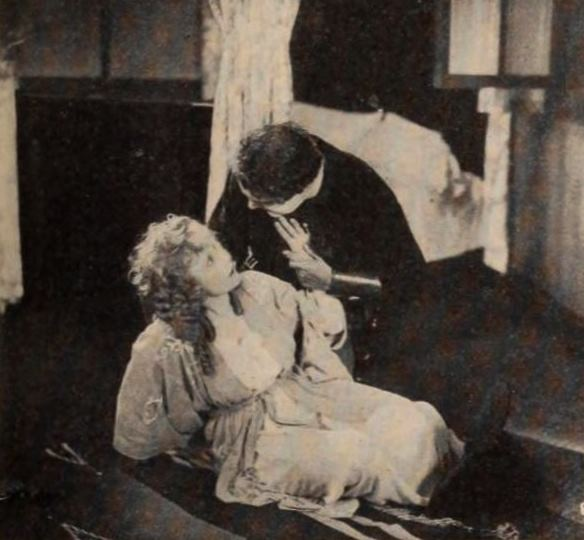
Drag Harlan (1920)

Jackie Saunders (born Anna Jacqueline Jaekel; October 6, 1892 – July 14, 1954) was an American silent screen actress who was one of the major players and stars of Balboa Films.

== Early years ==
She was born Anna Jackal in Philadelphia, Pennsylvania.

== Career ==
Before joining Balboa in 1914 at age 21, she had been a model and Orpheum Stock Company theater player. She starred in many of Balboa's films during its existence as a film-producing company. In the 1920s and after Balboa folded, she appeared in productions produced by William Fox, Metro Pictures, Lewis J. Selznick, Thomas H. Ince and B. P. Schulberg.

Films that Saunders made for Mutual achieved enough success in Australia that in 1919 a group of businessmen from that country tried to persuade her to make films there.

Her last known film credit was in 1925.

== Personal life ==
Saunders was married to Elwood D. Horkheimer from 1916 to 1920; and they had a daughter, Jacqueline. In 1927 she married J. Ward Cohen. They were wed until his death in 1951 and had a daughter, Mary Ann, who became an actress.

== Death ==
Saunders died in Palm Springs, California and was buried at the Welwood Murray cemetery in Palm Springs.

== Selected filmography ==
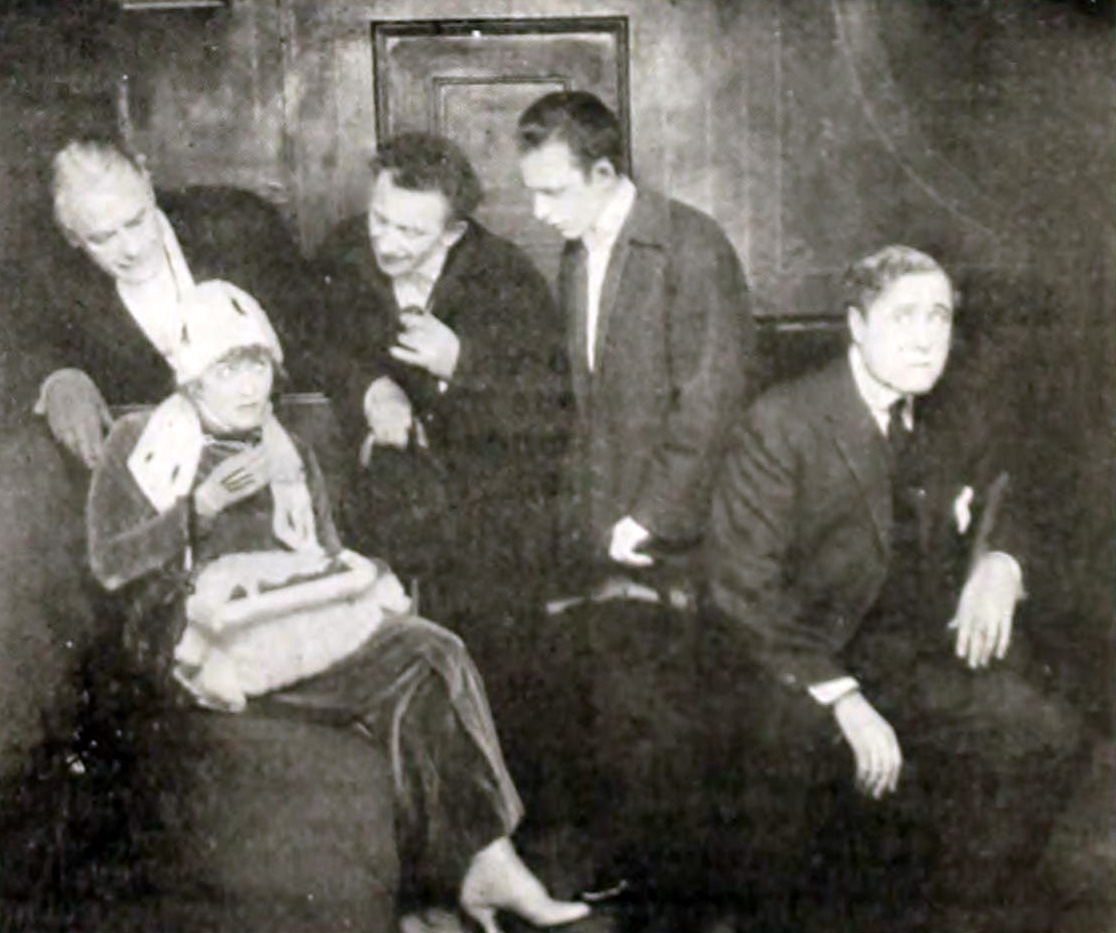
The Flirting Bride (1916)

- Through Darkened Vales (1911) (*short)
- The Old Bookkeeper (1912) (*short)
- Fatty and the Bandits (1913) (*short)
- Local Color (1913) (*short)
- The Heart Breakers (1916) (*short)
- The Flirting Bride (1916) (*short)
- The Child of the West (1916) (*short)
- The Shrine of Happiness (1916)
- The Girl Who Won (1916) (*short)
- The Twin Triangles (1916)
- The Grip of Evil (1916)
- Sunny Jane (1917)
- The Wildcat (1917)
- The Checkmate (1917)
- A Bit of Kindling (1917)
- Betty Be Good (1917)
- Bab the Fixer (1917)
- Muggsy (1919)
- Someone Must Pay (1919)
- The Miracle of Love (1919)
- Dad's Girl (1920)
- Drag Harlan (1920)
- The Scuttlers (1920)
- Puppets of Fate (1921)
- The Infamous Miss Revell (1921)
- Shattered Reputations (1923)
- Defying Destiny (1923)
- Alimony (1924)
- Great Diamond Mystery (1924)
- The Courageous Coward (1924)
- Broken Laws (1924)
- Flames of Desire (1924)
- Faint Perfume (1925)
- The People vs. Nancy Preston (1925)
