= Play Straight or Fight =

1918 film

- Directed by: Paul Hurst
- Written by: Karl R. Coolidge; Leon De La Mothe
- Starring: Hoot Gibson
- Distributed by: Universal Film Manufacturing Company
- Release date: June 15, 1918
- Running time: 20 minutes
- Country: United States
- Languages: Silent; English intertitles

Play Straight or Fight is a 1918 American short silent Western film directed by Paul Hurst.

== Cast ==
- Hoot Gibson
- Helen Gibson
- Millard K. Wilson
- G. Raymond Nye
- Noble Johnson

== Reception ==
Like many American films of the time, Play Straight or Fight was subject to restrictions and cuts by city and state film censorship boards. For example, the Chicago Board of Censors cut, in Reel 1, shooting the man through the door, and, Reel 2, bandits shooting at stage and man falling from coach.

== See also ==
- Hoot Gibson filmography
