= The Voice of Destiny =

1918 film by William Bertram

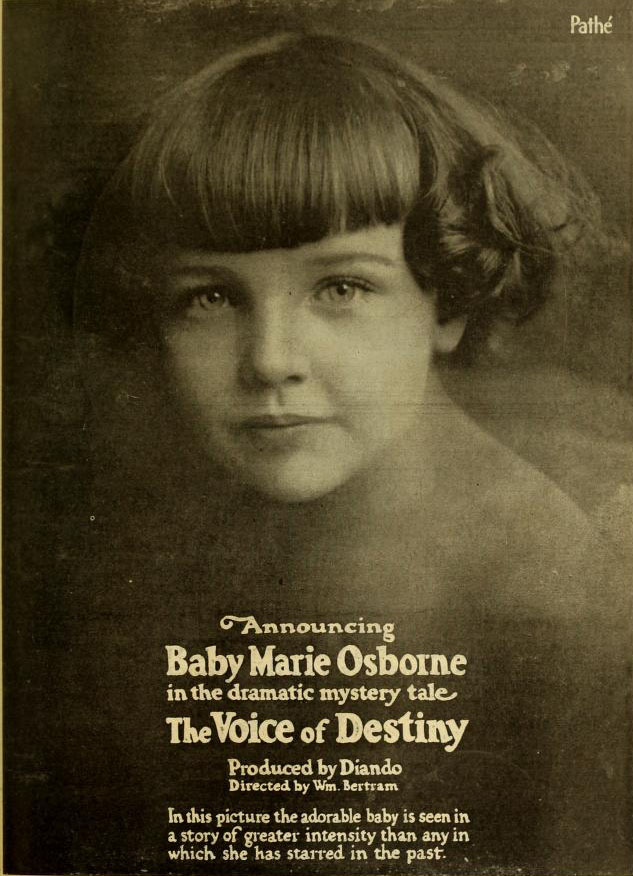
- Advertisement for the film
- Directed by: William Bertram
- Written by: Clara Beranger
- Starring: Marie Osborne; Jack Connolly; Morris Foster
- Production company: Diando Film Corporation
- Distributed by: Pathé Exchange
- Release date: June 23, 1918
- Running time: 5 reels
- Country: United States
- Language: Silent (English intertitles)

The Voice of Destiny is a 1918 silent mystery film directed by William Bertram. It was distributed by Pathé Exchange.

== Plot ==
Charles Lind, stricken blind, turns over his business affairs to his brother John, a widower. The latter's little daughter, Marie, becomes a constant companion to the blind man. John, through unfortunate investments in the stock market, is financially ruined and his confession to his brother leads to a bitter quarrel between the two. Later in the evening while Charles is sitting at his dictaphone he is mysteriously murdered and valuable jewelry taken. John is accused of the crime mainly through statements by Briggs, the butler, but escapes. Briggs, it is discovered, has been leading a dual life, combining robbery with his duties as a butler. When shot down in a battle with the police, he refuses to make a statement. Marie accidentally turns on the dictaphone which has recorded events preceding the murder and when confronted with this evidence from a mute witness, Briggs confesses to the murder and John is freed.

== Cast ==
- Marie Osborne as Marie Lind
- Jack Connolly as Charles Lind
- Morris Foster as John Lind
- Ellen Cassidy as Eleanor Lee
- Howard Crampton as Briggs

== Reception ==
A contemporary review in the Nebraska City News-Press praised Osborne's performance. The review also noted that the film had a "strong plot" with plenty of comic relief. Reviews in Exhibitors Herald, and the Tulsa Tribune. also praised Osborne's performance.
