= Ace High (1919 film) =

1919 film

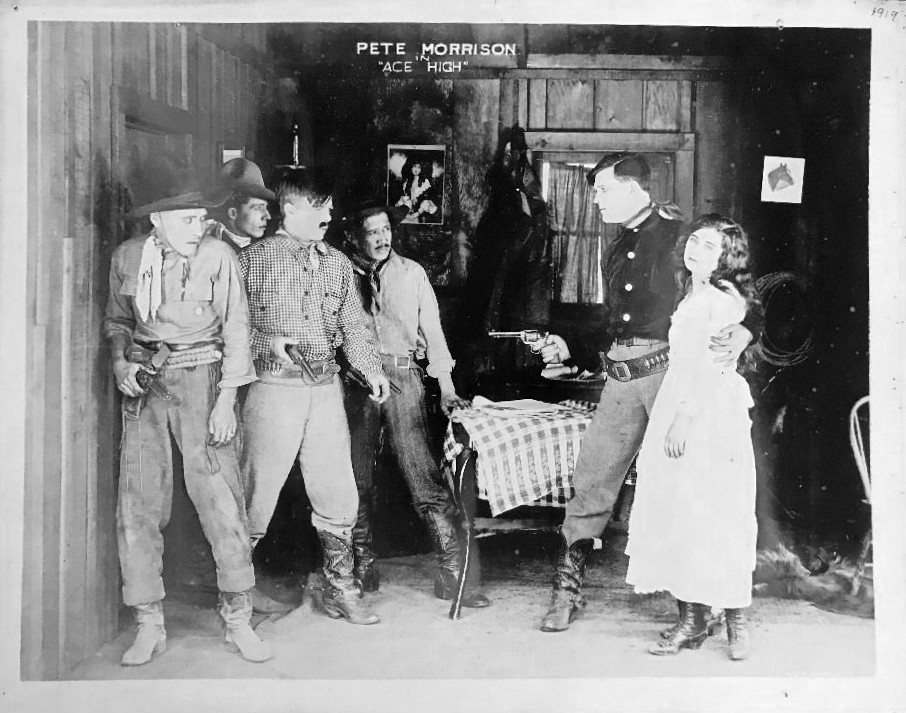
- Directed by: George Holt
- Written by: Karl R. Coolidge; William Pigott
- Starring: Hoot Gibson
- Distributed by: Universal Film Manufacturing Company
- Release date: April 23, 1919
- Running time: 20 minutes
- Country: United States
- Languages: Silent; English intertitles

Ace High is a 1919 American short silent Western film directed by George Holt and featuring Hoot Gibson.

== Cast ==
- Pete Morrison
- Magda Lane
- Hoot Gibson
- Helene Rosson (credited as Helen Rosson)
- Jack Walters
- Martha Mattox

== Note ==
- A film with identical title starred Tom Mix in 1918.

== See also ==
- List of American films of 1919
