= Gun Law (1919 film) =

1919 film directed by John Ford

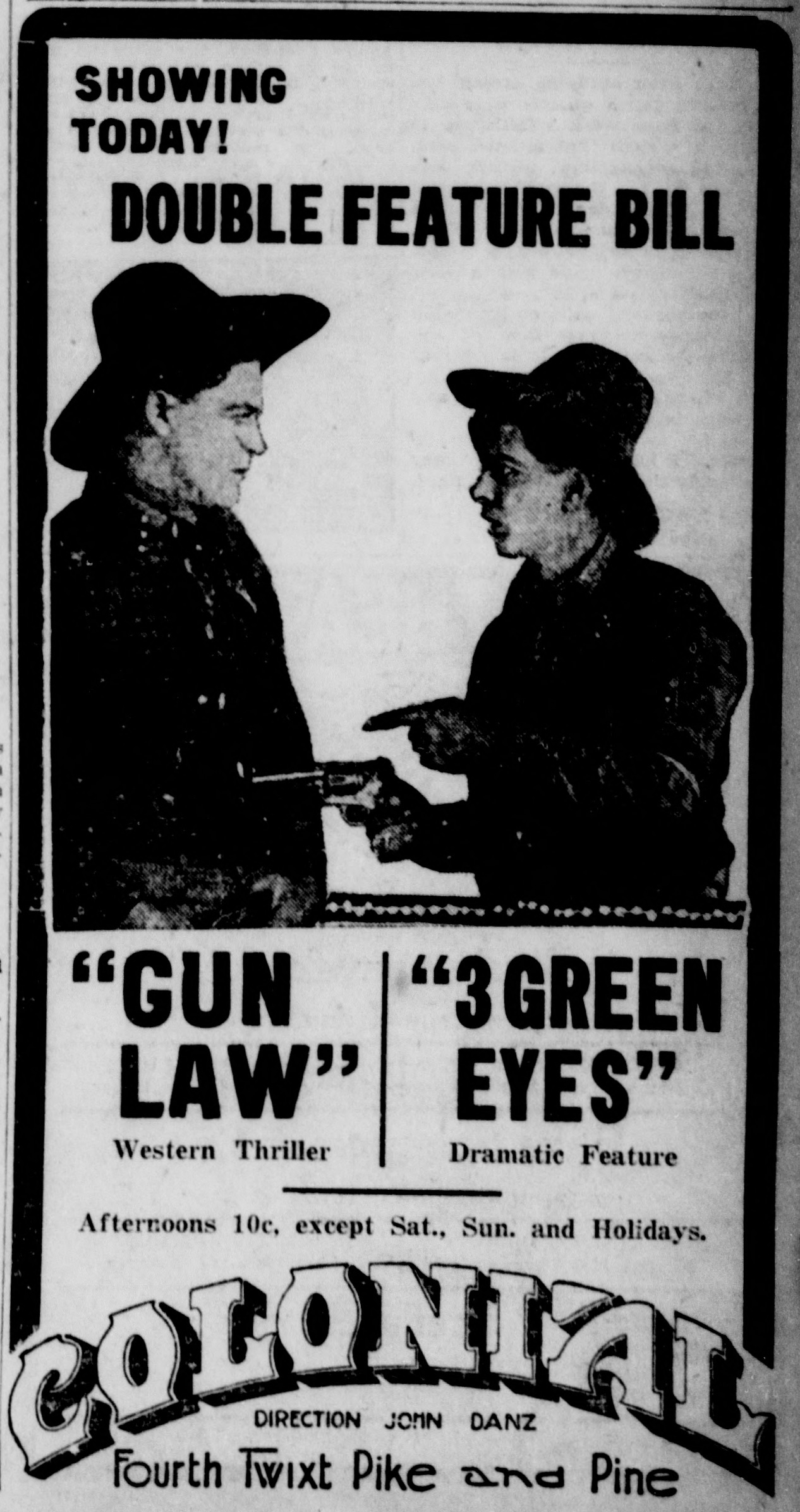
- Advertised as part of a double feature
- Directed by: John Ford
- Written by: H. Tipton Steck
- Starring: Pete Morrison
- Distributed by: Universal Film Manufacturing Company
- Release date: May 10, 1919
- Running time: 20 minutes
- Country: United States
- Languages: Silent; English intertitles

Gun Law is a 1919 American short silent Western film directed by John Ford.

== Plot summary ==
Secret Serviceman Dick Allen takes a job at Bart Stevens' mine in order to find evidence proving that Stevens is a mail robber named Smoke Gublen. He does - but by then, he is in love with the man's sister - and to make things harder, Stevens saves his life, so he struggles between love and duty.

== Cast ==
- Pete Morrison as Dick Allen
- Helen Gibson as Letty
- Hoot Gibson as Bart Stevens, a.k.a. Smoke Gublen
- Jack Woods as Cayuse Yates
- Otto Myers as Gang Member
- Harry Chambers as Gang Member
- Ed Jones as Gang Member
