= Puppets of Fate (1921 film) =

1921 film

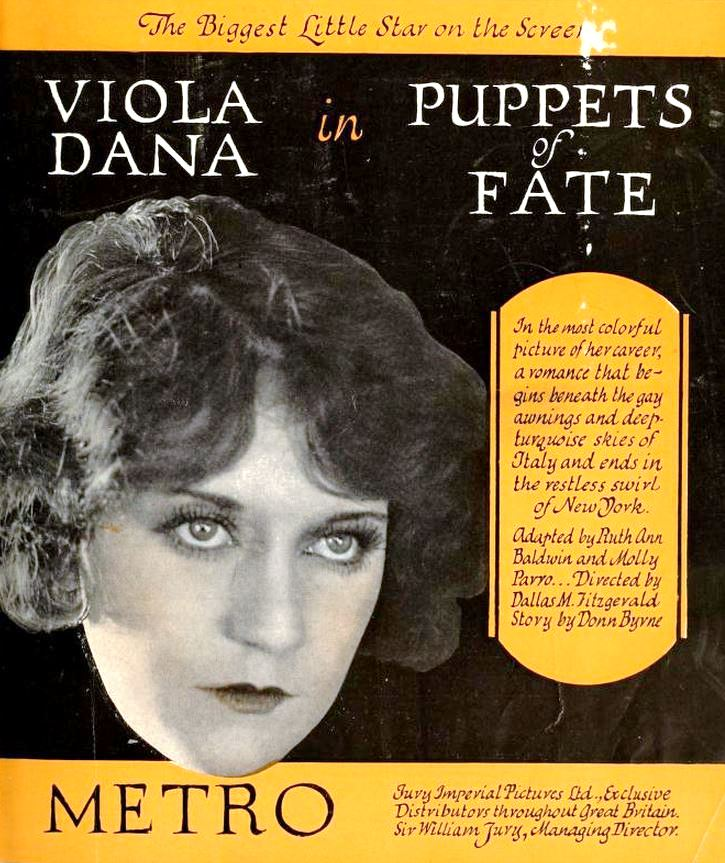
- Advertisement
- Directed by: Dallas M. Fitzgerald
- Written by: Ruth Ann Baldwin; Brian Oswald Donn-Byrne; Molly Parro
- Produced by: Maxwell Karger
- Starring: Viola Dana; Francis McDonald; Jackie Saunders
- Cinematography: John Arnold
- Production company: Metro Pictures
- Distributed by: Metro Pictures
- Release date: March 28, 1921
- Running time: 60 minutes
- Country: United States
- Language: Silent (English intertitles)

Puppets of Fate is a 1921 American silent drama film directed by Dallas M. Fitzgerald and starring Viola Dana, Francis McDonald, and Jackie Saunders.

== Cast ==
- Viola Dana as Sorrentina Palombra
- Francis McDonald as Gabriel Palombra
- Jackie Saunders as 'Babe' Reynolds
- Fred Kelsey as Bobs
- Tom Ricketts as Father Francesco
- Edgar Kennedy as Mike Reynolds

== Preservation ==
A complete print of Puppets of Fate is held by the Cinemateca Brasileira in São Paulo.

== Bibliography ==
- Donald W. McCaffrey & Christopher P. Jacobs. Guide to the Silent Years of American Cinema. Greenwood Publishing, 1999. ISBN 0-313-30345-2
