= Reliance-Majestic Studios =

Coordinates: 34°5′53.41″N 118°17′16.17″W

- Industry: Movie studio
- Founded: 1914; 112 years ago
- Defunct: 1915; 111 years ago
- Headquarters: Hollywood, California

Reliance-Majestic Studios was an early American movie studio in Hollywood, California, originally built around 1914 at 4516 Sunset Boulevard.

Within a few years, it became the home of D. W. Griffith and Mutual Film Corporation. The studio's name was changed to Fine Arts Studios, and was sometimes known as the Griffith Studio or the Griffith Artcraft Studio. The studio was formed by Mutual as a partnership between D. W. Griffith and Majestic Studio owner Harry Aitken.

The Birth of a Nation (1915), Hearts of the World (1918) and Broken Blossoms (1919) were partially or fully lensed at the studio. The sets for Intolerance (1916) were erected across the street where the Vista Theatre stands.

In 1915, Thomas Ince's Kay-Bee Pictures, Mack Sennett's Keystone Studios, and D. W. Griffith's Reliance-Majestic studio were combined to form the Triangle Film Corporation, which was headed by Harry and Roy Aitken.

In 1927, Tiffany Pictures acquired the lot. Upon Tiffany's bankruptcy in 1932, the stages were renamed Talisman studios and used as a rental studio by a variety of studios such as Monogram Pictures.

The lot (now with the address 4520 Sunset Boulevard) is currently the location of a Vons supermarket.

== Filmography ==
=== Fine Arts Film Company ===
- The Penitentes (1915)
- Old Heidelberg (1915)
- Jordan Is a Hard Road (1915)
- Double Trouble (1915)
- Fifty-Fifty (1916)
- Flirting with Fate (1916)
- Manhattan Madness (1916)
- Reggie Mixes In (1916)
- Stranded (1916)
- The Habit of Happiness (1916)
- Sunshine Dad (1916)
- The Missing Links (1916)
- The Devil's Needle (1916)
- A Sister of Six (1916)
- The Wood Nymph (1916)
- The Children of the Feud (1916)
- Betty of Greystone (1916)
- The Americano (1916)
- Diane of the Follies (1916)
- Gretchen the Greenhorn (1916)
- The Good Bad-Man (1916)
- The Old Folks at Home (1916)
- The Children Pay (1916)
- His Picture in the Papers (1916)
- American Aristocracy (1916)
- Pathways of Life (1916)
- The Little School Ma'am (1916)
- The House Built Upon Sand (1916)
- Her Official Fathers (1917)
- Hell-to-Pay Austin (1917)
- Jim Bludso (1917)
- Cheerful Givers (1917)
- A Daughter of the Poor (1917)
- Hands Up! (1917)
- Souls Triumphant (1917)
- The Bad Boy (1917)
- The Little Yank (1917)

== See also ==
- Majestic Film Company
