= Lorcha (boat) =

Sailed cargo vessel

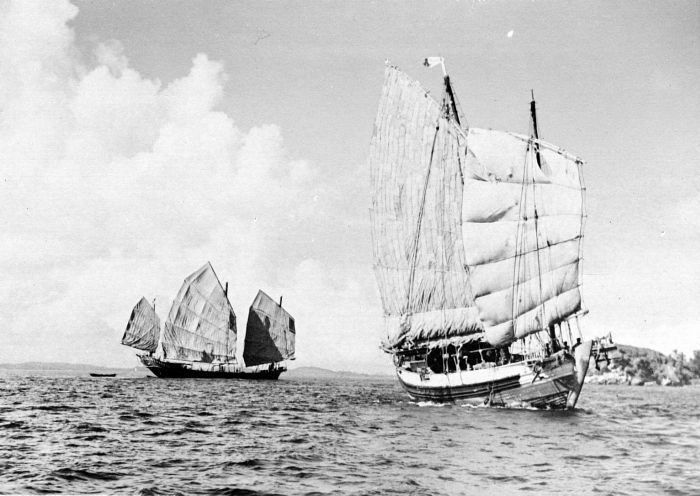
A junk (left) and a lorcha (right) in 1936 near Sambu Island, Indonesia.

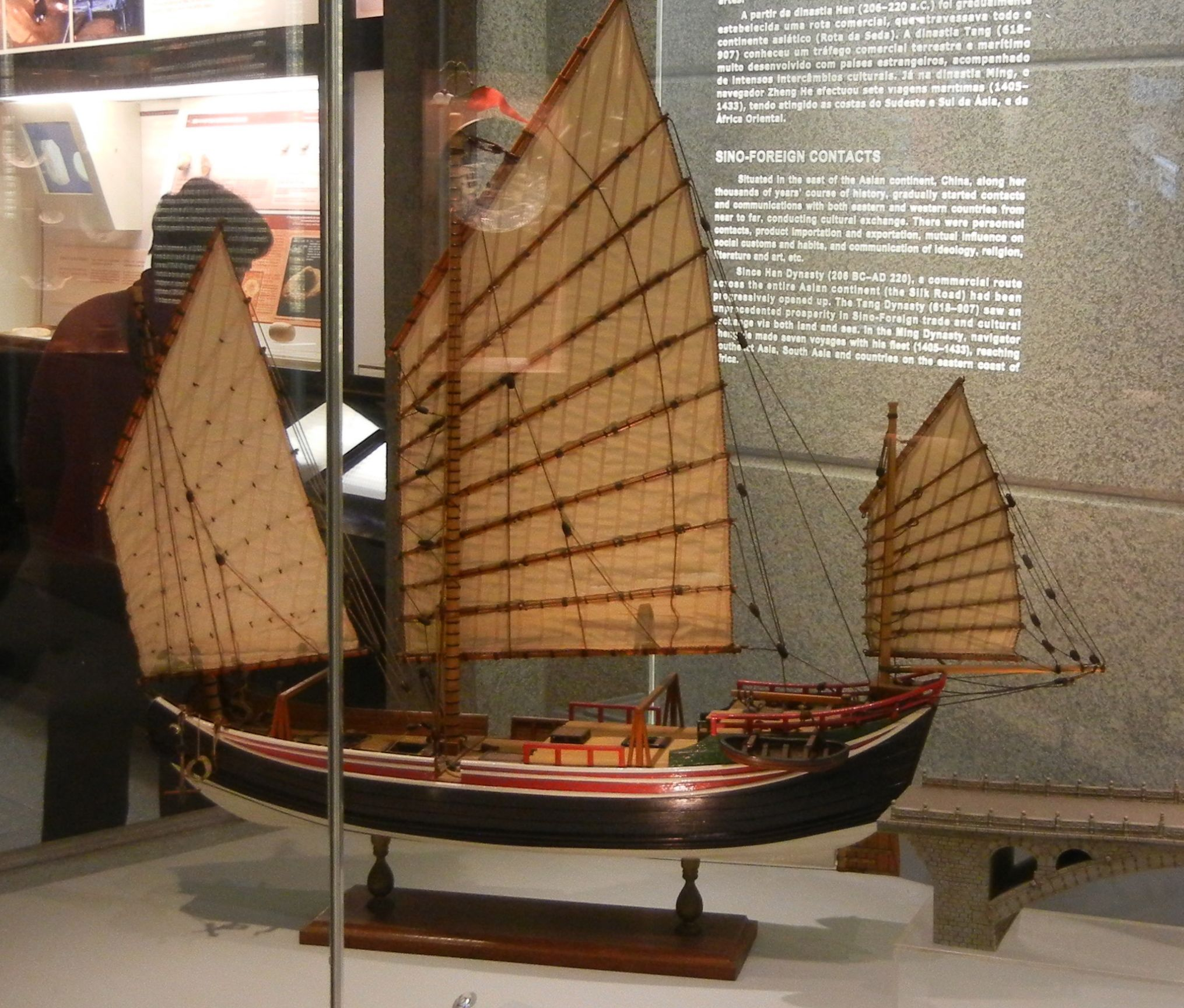
Model of a lorcha in the Macau Museum, 2011

The lorcha is a type of sailing vessel having a junk rig with a Cantonese or other Chinese-style batten sails on a Portuguese or other European-style hull. The hull structure made the lorcha faster and able to carry more cargo than the normal junk. The advantage of the junk rig was in its ease of handling and resulting reduced crewing requirement, together with its relatively low cost of construction. Owing to its simplicity, it was also easier to repair. Lorchas were made locally of camphor or teak and generally were of 30 to 150 tons burthen.

== History ==
This type of vessel was developed around 1550 in Macau, then a Portuguese colony in China. This hybrid type of vessel sailed faster than traditional eastern ships. British merchants began to use lorchas in Chinese waters after the First Opium War.

The Arrow, the ship whose seizure was the casus belli for the Second Opium War, was a lorcha.

The Vũng Tàu shipwreck is a lorcha that sunk near the Côn Đảo Islands and has been dated to about 1690.

A type of lorcha sailing lighter was used formerly in Bangkok to carry rice out to ocean ships over the bar of the Chao Phraya River.

The book The Sable Lorcha (1913) was written by Horace Hazeltine. It was adapted to film in 1915.

== See also ==
- Bedar (ship)
- Pinas (ship)
- Junk (ship)
