= Chester B. Clapp =

American screenwriter (1883–?)

Chester Blinn Clapp
- Born: February 19, 1883; Marblehead, Massachusetts, U.S.
- Died: Death date unknown
- Other name: C.B. Clapp
- Education: Tufts University (BA), Middlebury College
- Occupations: Screenwriter, journalist, businessperson

Chester Blinn Clapp (February 19, 1883 – death date unknown), also known as C.B. Clapp, was an American screenwriter. He is known for his early 20th-century scenario writing for film. In his later life he was a businessman and worked in the shoe industry.

== Life and career ==
Chester Blinn Clapp was born on February 19, 1883, in Marblehead, Massachusetts. He was the son of Albert B. Clapp. Clapp attended Tufts University (BA degree 1900) in Massachusetts, and Middlebury College (c. 1901–1905) in Middlebury, Vermont.

In his early career Clapp worked for the New York Dramatic Mirror, a theatrical trade newspaper. He interviewed Blanche Walsh about the difference between acting on the stage and for films for the paper; and in 1912 he wrote about Florence Lawrence for the paper. Starting in May 1915, Clapp worked at the short-lived Reliance-Majestic Studios as a scenario writer. Clapp later worked as a personal writer and advisor to film director Raoul Walsh (R. A. Walsh) at the American Film Company; and was on the writing staff for Eugene B. Lewis at Universal City Studios starting in 1917.

Clapp worked on a 1915 screen adaptation of Horace Hazeltine's novel The Sable Lorcha. He was contracted to adapt a screenplay for a William Russell feature film titled, A Night in New York. The film New York Luck (1917) written by Clapp and starring Russell was released that year.

In the 1920s, Clapp returned to Massachusetts and worked in the shoe industry with his father.

== Filmography ==
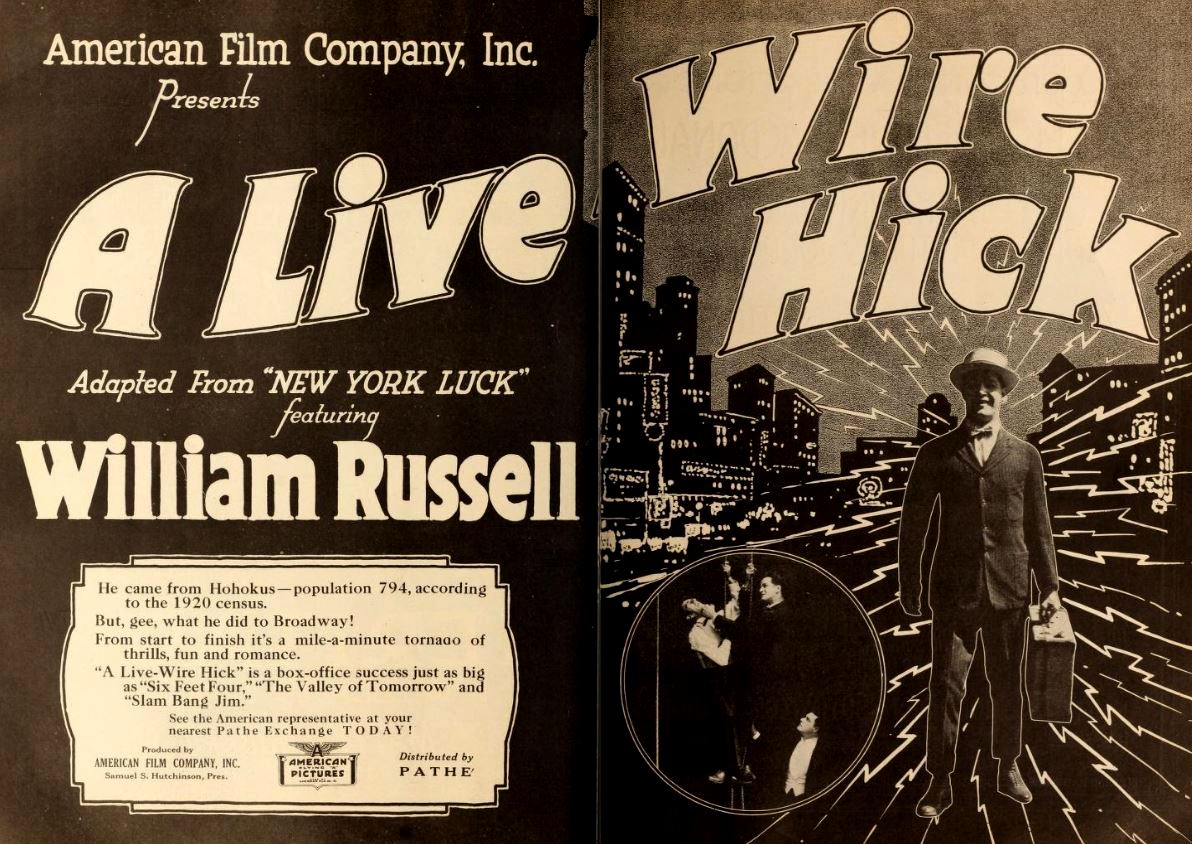
Advertisement for New York Luck (1917)

- The Wolf Man (1915)
- Added Fuel (1915)
- Old Heidelberg (1915)
- A Mother's Justice (1915)
- The Sable Lorcha (1915), screenplay adaptation of novel The Sable Lorcha (1912) by Horace Hazeltine
- Out of Bondage (1915)
- The Silent Lie (1917), screenplay adaptation of the short story "Conahan" by Larry Evans
- The Conqueror (1917), screenplay adaptation from a story by Henry Christeen Warnack
- Snap Judgment (1917)
- New York Luck (1917)
- Betrayed (1917)
- Miss Jackie of the Army (1917), screenplay adaptation from a story “Doing Her Bit” by Beatrice Van and William Parker
