= Madame Bo-Peep =

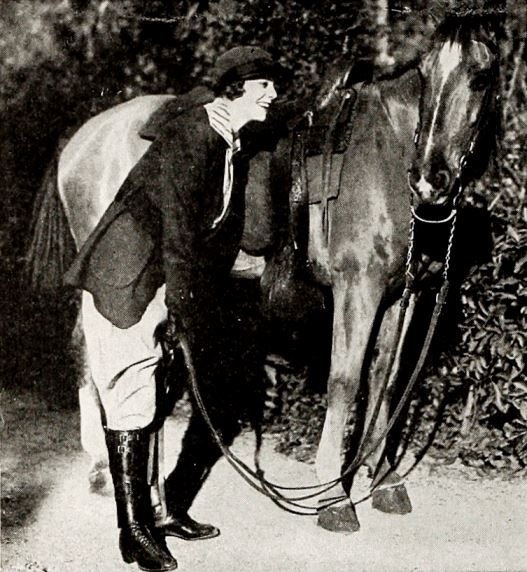
- Still with Owen
- Directed by: Chester Withey
- Written by: Chester Withey
- Based on: "Madame Bo-Peep of the Ranches" by O. Henry
- Starring: Seena Owen; Allan Sears; F.A. Turner
- Cinematography: David Abel
- Production company: Fine Arts Film Company
- Distributed by: Triangle Distributing
- Release date: May 27, 1917
- Running time: 50 minutes
- Country: United States
- Language: Silent (English intertitles)

Madame Bo-Peep is a 1917 American silent comedy film directed by Chester Withey and starring Seena Owen, Allan Sears, and F.A. Turner. It is based on the short story "Madame Bo-Peep of the Ranches" by O. Henry, which originally appeared in his 1910 short-story collection Whirligigs.

== Cast ==
- Seena Owen as Octavia
- Allan Sears as Teddy Westlake
- F.A. Turner as Colonel Beaupree
- James Harrison as Willie Cooper
- Sam De Grasse as Jose Alvarez
- Pauline Starke as Juanita
- Kate Bruce as Aunt Sophie
- Jennie Lee as Housekeeper

== Preservation ==
Madame Bo-Peep is currently presumed lost. In February of 2021, the film was cited by the National Film Preservation Board on their Lost U.S. Silent Feature Films list.

== Bibliography ==
- Goble, Alan. The Complete Index to Literary Sources in Film. Walter de Gruyter, 1999.
