= Casey at the Bat (disambiguation) =

Casey at the Bat is a poem written in 1888 by Ernest Thayer.

Casey at the Bat may also refer to:

- Casey at the Bat (1916 film), a film based on the poem
- Casey at the Bat (1927 film), a film based on the poem
- Casey at the Bat, a segment of Make Mine Music, 1946 animated musical anthology film
- Casey at the Bat, an autobiography by Casey Stengel
