= Acquitted (disambiguation) =

In common law jurisdictions, an acquittal certifies that the accused is free from the charge of an offense, as far as the criminal law is concerned.

Acquitted may also refer to:

- Acquitted (1916 film), a silent film
- Acquitted (1929 film), an American melodrama
- Frikjent, also known as Acquitted, a 2015 Norwegian TV series
