= Richard Leslie =

Richard Leslie may refer to:

- Richard Leslie (priest)
- Richard Leslie (actor)
