= The Missing Links (film) =

1916 film by Lloyd Ingraham

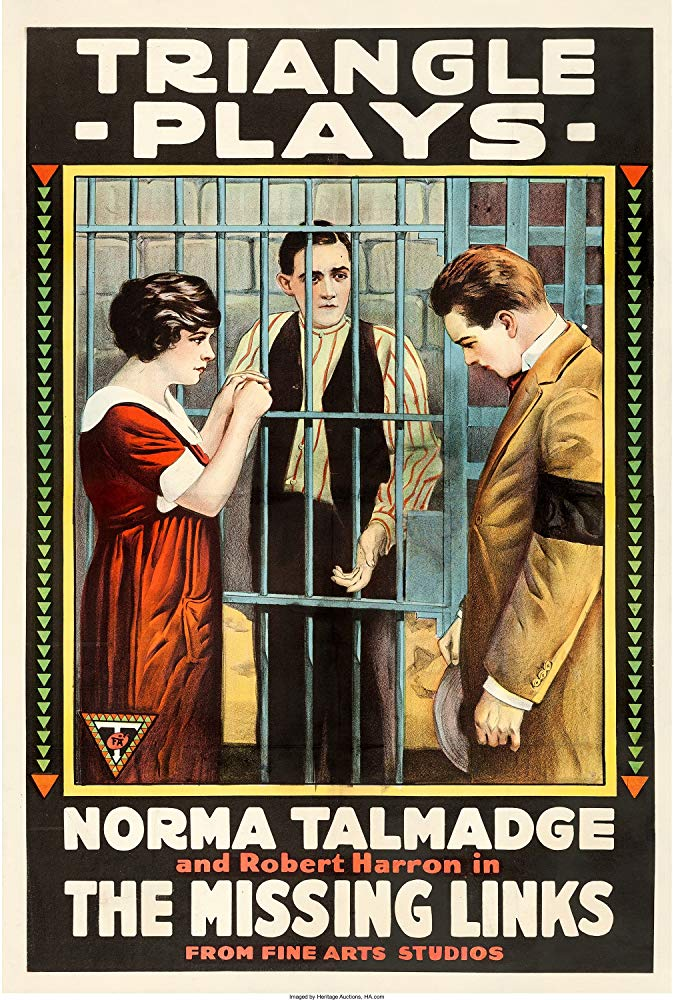
- Directed by: Lloyd Ingraham
- Written by: D. W. Griffith; Bernard McConville
- Produced by: D. W. Griffith
- Starring: Thomas Jefferson; Elmer Clifton; Robert Harron
- Production company: Fine Arts Film Company
- Distributed by: Triangle Film Corporation
- Release date: January 16, 1916
- Running time: 50 minutes
- Country: United States
- Languages: Silent; English intertitles

The Missing Links is a lost 1916 American silent crime film directed by Lloyd Ingraham and starring Thomas Jefferson, Elmer Clifton, and Robert Harron. The film was written by Bernard McConville and D. W. Griffith, who also produced it. It premiered on January 16, 1916 as a production of the Fine Arts Film Company. It was distributed by Triangle Distributing. The Missing Links was Norma Talmadge's first film for Triangle.

The film tells of a murder in a small rural town. The major suspects are two brothers, Horace and Henry (Clifton and Harron). Each believes the other to be guilty, so confesses to save their brother.

== Actors ==
Actor	Role
Thomas Jefferson	Arthur Gaylord
Elmer Clifton	Horace Gaylord
Robert Harron	Henry Gaylord
Loyola O'Connor	Miss Gaylord
William Higby	Jasper Starr
Elinor Stone	Mrs Starr
Norma Talmadge	Myra Holburn
Jack Brammall	C. P. Martin
Hal Wilson	James Haskins
Constance Talmadge	Laura Haskins
Robert Lawler	Chris Tompkins

== Preservation ==
With no holdings located in archives, The Missing Links is considered a lost film.
