= The Heiress at Coffee Dan's =

1916 silent film by Edward Dillon

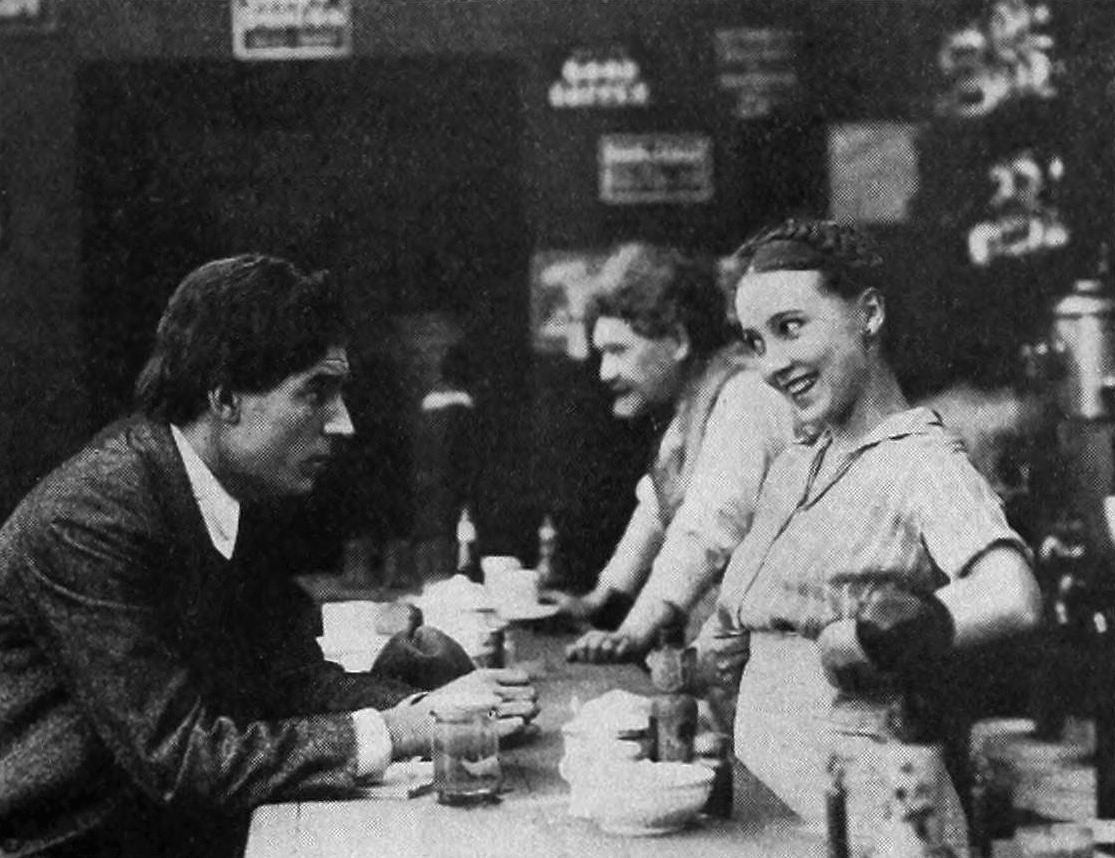
- Frank Bennett and Bessie Love
- Directed by: Edward Dillon
- Screenplay by: Bernard McConville
- Starring: Bessie Love
- Cinematography: David Abel
- Production company: Fine Arts Film Company
- Distributed by: Triangle Film Corporation
- Release date: December 1916 (U.S.) (Note: Various publications provide different release dates: December 21, 23, and 24.)
- Running time: 5 reels
- Country: United States
- Language: Silent (English intertitles)

The Heiress at Coffee Dan's is a 1916 American silent comedy-drama film produced by the Fine Arts Film Company and distributed by Triangle Film Corporation. It starred Bessie Love and was directed by Edward Dillon.

The film is presumed lost.

== Plot ==
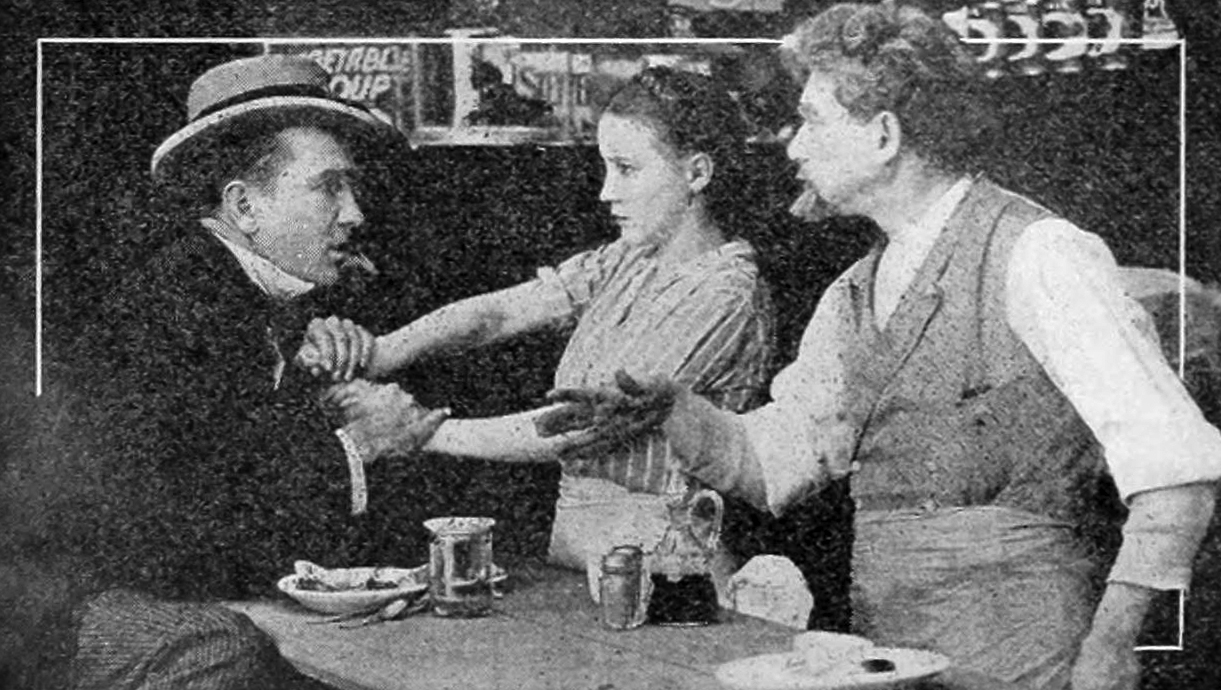
Waffles (Love) deals with a customer in the diner

Waffles (Love) is a Swedish immigrant who is working as a waitress in Coffee Dan's, a San Francisco diner. She is in love with poor composer Carl (Bennett).

Thieves Clara Johnstone (Younge) and Bert Gallagher (Paget) learn about a missing heiress in a newspaper, and convince Waffles that she is the heiress. Waffles moves into a lavish mansion, and plans to buys the diner for its chef Shorty (Davidson), publish Carl's music, and adopt a baby. However, Johnstone breaks up Waffles and Carl, and Waffles becomes engaged to Gallagher. Before the wedding, Carl appears and stops it.

When the real heiress appears, Waffles returns to her original life, but she receives a reward for the capture of Johnstone and Gallagher. With her money, she buys the diner for Shorty, publishes Carl's music, and adopts the baby.

== Cast ==
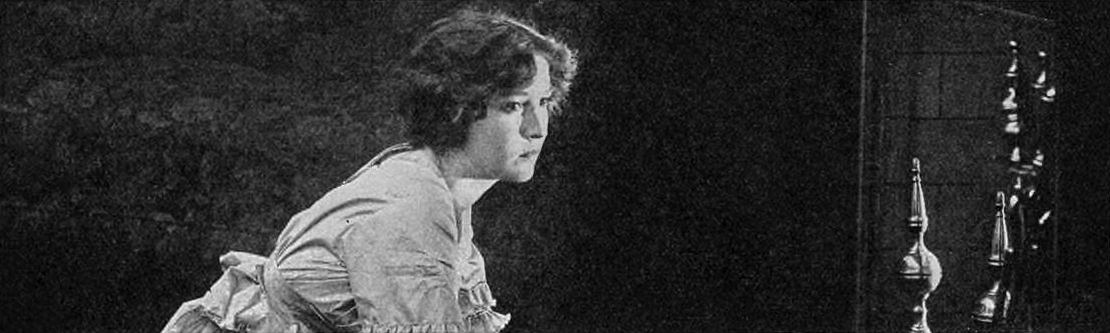
Waffles (Love) poses as a rich heiress

- Bessie Love as "Waffles"
- Frank Bennett as Carl Miller
- Max Davidson as "Shorty" Olson
- Lucille Younge as Clara Johnstone
- Alfred Paget as Bert Gallagher
- Alva Blake as "Slim" Magee
- Carmel Myers as A Waitress

== Reception ==
Bessie Love received positive reviews for her performance in the title role, called "always pleasing".

The film received mixed reviews. Reviewer George Graves liked the film, but would have preferred it as a straight comedy. He called the direction "adequate". One review called it a "dull story."
