= Nina, the Flower Girl =

1917 silent film by Lloyd Ingraham

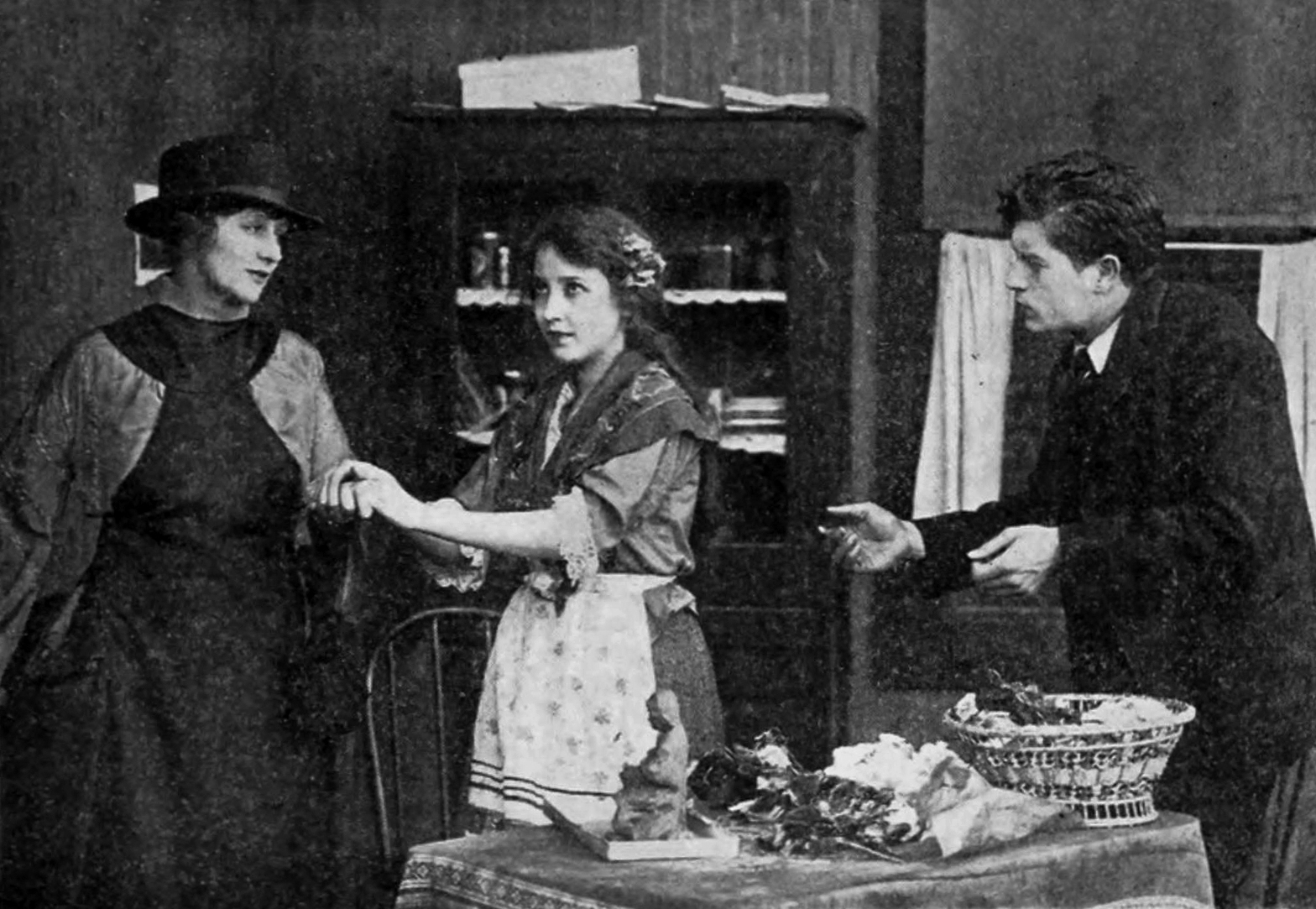
- Scene from the film
- Directed by: Lloyd Ingraham
- Written by: Mary H. O'Connor
- Produced by: D. W. Griffith
- Starring: Bessie Love
- Cinematography: Frank Urson
- Production company: Fine Arts Film Company
- Distributed by: Triangle Film Corporation
- Release date: January 21, 1917 (U.S.)
- Running time: 5 reels
- Country: United States
- Language: Silent (English intertitles)

Nina, the Flower Girl is a 1917 American silent drama film produced by D. W. Griffith through his Fine Arts Film Company and distributed by Triangle Film Corporation. The film starred Bessie Love, an up-and-coming ingénue actress. It marked the final acting role for Elmer Clifton, who was by then moving on to directing full-time.

The film is presumed lost.

== Plot ==
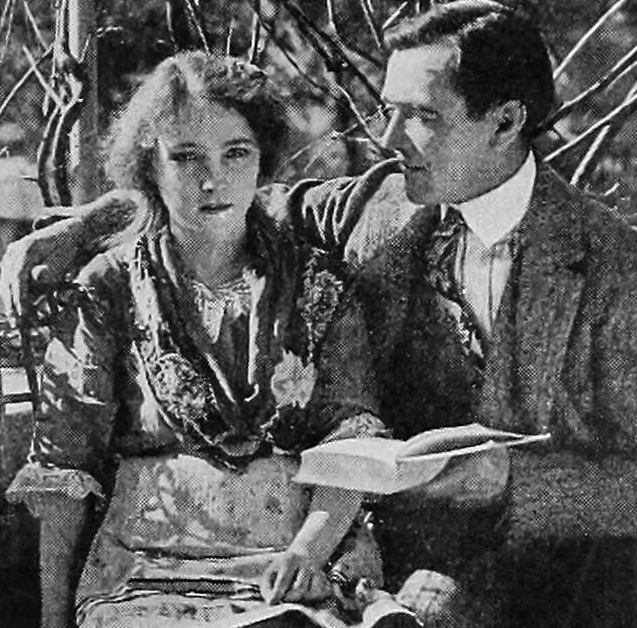
Fred (Bert Hadley) reads to Nina (Bessie Love)

Nina, who is blind, makes artificial flowers. Jimmie, a hunchback newsboy and artist, is in love with her. Nina has been deceived into thinking that Jimmie is a prince who lives in a palace. When wealthy Fred Townsend and his mother offer to finance a surgery to restore Nina's vision, Jimmie misunderstands and thinks that the Townsends plan to harm her. He tries to protect her, but learns of their true intentions.

Nina undergoes the surgery and regains her vision, but Jimmie fears she may no longer love him once she sees he is not a prince. He plans to end his life by falling from a high place but instead encounters a surgeon who corrects his hunchback. He and Nina are reunited and in love.

== Cast ==
- Bessie Love as Nina, the flower girl
- Elmer Clifton as Jimmie, the newsboy
- Bert Hadley as Fred Townsend
- Loyola O'Connor as Mrs. Townsend, his mother
- Alfred Paget as Archie Dean
- Fred Warren as Dr. Fletcher
- Adele Clifton as Fifi Chandler
- Rhea Haines as Lotta, her chum
- Jennie Lee as Nina's grandmother
- Mrs. Higby as Mrs. Hicks

== Production ==
To prepare for her role as the blind girl, Love spent time at the Los Angeles Institute for the Blind.

During filming, a six-piece orchestra played music for the actors, and real champagne was used on camera.

== Release and reception ==
Upon its release, it was shown with a Keystone comedy.

The film received mediocre to negative reviews. In particular, its blatant sentimentality was poorly received.

Bessie Love's performance was praised, described by one reviewer as "an excellent bit of unaffected acting".
