= Reaching for the Moon (1917 film) =

1917 film by John Emerson

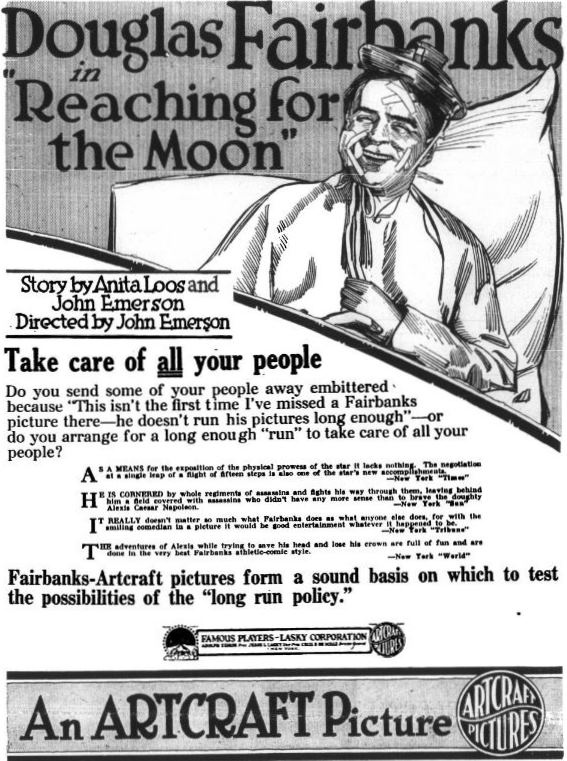
- Advertisement
- Directed by: John Emerson
- Screenplay by: John Emerson; Joseph Henabery; Anita Loos
- Produced by: Douglas Fairbanks
- Starring: Douglas Fairbanks; Eileen Percy; Richard Henry Cummings; Millard Webb; Eugene Ormonde; Frank Campeau
- Cinematography: Victor Fleming; Sam Landers
- Edited by: William Shea
- Production company: Douglas Fairbanks Pictures
- Distributed by: Paramount Pictures
- Release date: November 17, 1917
- Running time: 69 minutes
- Country: United States
- Language: Silent (English intertitles)

Reaching for the Moon is a 1917 American silent adventure film directed by John Emerson and written by John Emerson, Joseph Henabery, and Anita Loos. The film stars Douglas Fairbanks, Eileen Percy, Richard Henry Cummings, Millard Webb, Eugene Ormonde, and Frank Campeau. The film was released on November 17, 1917, by Paramount Pictures. It has been released on DVD.

Fairbanks later starred in a 1930 film of the same name that is unrelated to the 1917 film.

== Plot ==
As described in a film magazine, Alexis Caesar Napoleon Brown learns that his mother was a great princess from the European province of Vulgaria but became an outcast because she did not marry royal blood. Alexis believes that if one concentrates on one thing long enough, it will come true. He is continuously concentrating on the idea some day he will be king of Vulgaria. He tells his ambitions to the girl of his dreams, who is the "patient listener." After one of his conferences with his patient sweetheart he goes home and dreams he is king of Vulgaria. On all sides his life is threatened by Black Boris, who aspires to the throne. Arrangements are made for him to marry the Princess Valentina, but after one glance at her he is ready to run away. However, he is persuaded to remain and it becomes necessary for him to fight a duel with his rival Boris. Alexis, not knowing how to use a sword, puts up a poor fight and after a short struggle is sent flying down a steep precipice. It becomes steeper and steeper until Alexis awakens, having fallen out of bed. He is cured of his desires and is happy in his little home in New Jersey with his "patient listener" as Mrs. Alexis Caesar Napoleon Brown and a two-year-old to pass his time with.

== Cast ==
- Douglas Fairbanks as Alexis Caesar Napoleon Brown
- Eileen Percy as Elsie Merrill
- Richard Henry Cummings as Old Bingham the Boss
- Millard Webb as Mr. Mann
- Eugene Ormonde as Sergius Badinoff the Prime
- Frank Campeau as Black Boris
- Joe Brooks as secondary supporting role (uncredited)
- Jim Hogan as secondary supporting role (uncredited)
  Reaching For The Moon (1917)
- Bull Montana as Bus Passenger (uncredited)
- Charles Stevens as Boris' Lieutenant (uncredited)
- Keene Thompson as secondary supporting role (uncredited)
- Erich von Stroheim as Prince Badinoff's Aide (uncredited)
