= Doctor Bridget =

American comedy short film

Doctor Bridget is an extant short comedy film from 1912. It was directed by Frederick A. Thomson, and starred John Bunny, then a popular silent film actor, as Bridget, the cook and dishwasher.

The film is about a spoiled and sickly young man, Freddie, who undergoes various medical tests and treatments. When Freddie's parents go out of town, Bridget discerns that Freddie is just lazy and is faking illness, so he kicks the doctor out and takes advantage of the opportunity to restore Freddie's vigor.

The San Diego Sun reviewed the film positively, writing: "John Bunny, the vitagraph favorite, was never-funnier than in "Doctor Bridget" where he plays a fat good-natured cook who prescribes for the imaginary ills of the son of the house. The film is a laugh from beginning to end".

The film is part of the EYE Film Institute Netherlands collection and includes titles in Dutch.

== Cast ==
- John Bunny as Bridget, the cook
- Flora Finch, Finch and Bunny also appeared together in the Vitagraph short Those Troublesome Tresses
- Harry T. Morey
- Charles Eldridge
- Charles Edwards
- Richard Leslie
- Hal Wilson
