= The Jack-Knife Man =

1920 film directed by King Vidor

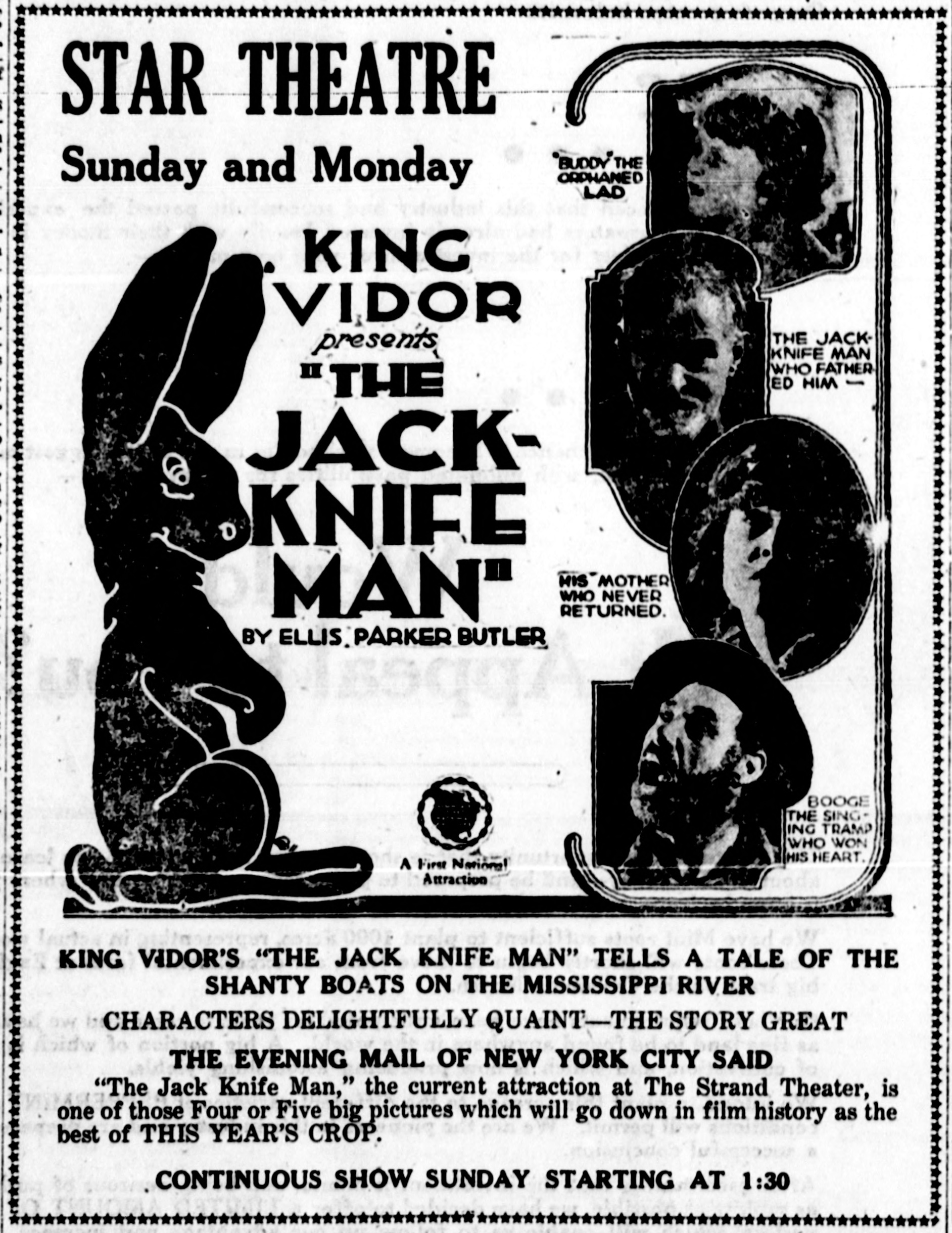
- Newspaper advertisement
- Directed by: King Vidor
- Written by: William Parker
- Based on: The Jack-Knife Man by Ellis Parker Butler
- Produced by: King Vidor
- Starring: F. A. Turner
- Cinematography: Ira H. Morgan
- Production company: King W. Vidor Productions
- Distributed by: First National
- Release date: August 1, 1920
- Running time: 60 minutes
- Country: United States
- Language: Silent (English intertitles)

The Jack-Knife Man is a 1920 American silent drama film directed by King Vidor and his debut film with First National. A story of Christian charity and the virtues of self-help, the work reflects his "Creed and Pledge", a declaration of his artistic principles published the same year. Prints of the film survive in several film archives.

== Plot ==
As described in a film magazine, Peter Lane, known as the "jack-knife man" because he spends his time whittling objects from wood, selling them to earn a living, loves and is loved by the Widow Potter, desisting from matrimony for reasons known only to himself. When a hungry child, "Buddy," comes to his houseboat in quest of food, Peter asks and receives the aid of the Widow Potter. Returning to the boat he finds the boy's mother, dying, and he buries her and adopts the boy. A while later a tramp, "Booge," joins the queer family and refuses to be ousted. The three become inseparable companions. Then a busybody parson seizes the boy and insists on finding a home for him, placing him with the Widow Potter. Time passes and Peter becomes widely sought as a maker of wooden toys. After some developments of a startling nature, his financial position improves, and Peter marries the widow and all are happy.

== Cast ==
- F. A. Turner as Peter Lane (credited as Fred Turner)
- Harry Todd as 'Booge'
- Bobby Kelso as 'Buddy'
- Willis Marks as Rasmer Briggles
- Lillian Leighton as Widow Potter
- James Corrigan as George Rapp
- Claire McDowell as Lize Merdin (credited as Claire MacDowell)
- Charles Arling as The Doctor
- Florence Vidor as Mrs. Marcia Montgomery
- Irene Yeager as Susie (credited as Irene Yaeger)
- Carol Marshall as Jane
- Anna Dodge as Undetermined Role (credited as Mrs. George Hernandez)

== Production ==
The Jack Knife Man was the first picture filmed at Vidor's newly constructed 15-acre studio, "Vidor Village" in Hollywood, California. The new studio was part of a joint venture by King Vidor and First National to create films, independent of the major studios, to show at First National's numerous theaters. Vidor paid for the construction of Vidor Village with a portion his $75,000 advance from the exhibitors. Exterior scenes were filmed in Stockton, California.

== Theme ==
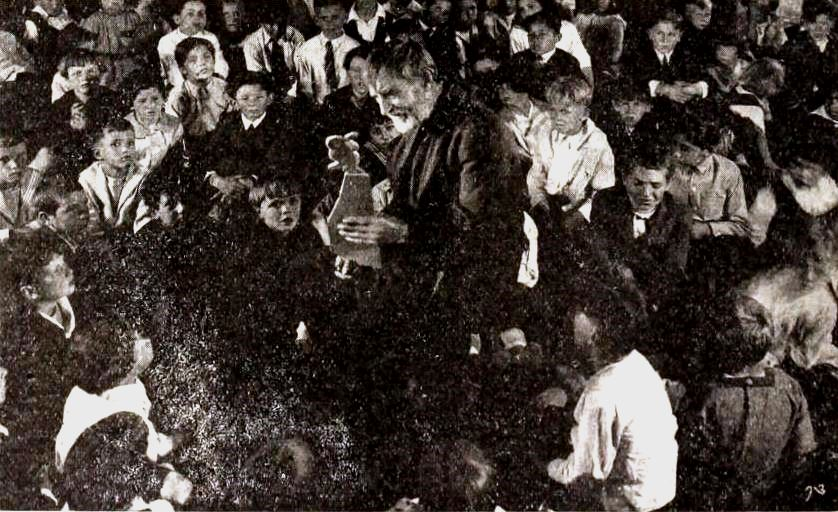
F. A. "Fred" Turner as Peter Lane in The Jack-Knife Man (1920)

Vidor issued his "Creed and Pledge" in Variety magazine shortly before directing The Jack-Knife Man, a manifesto of his artistic and social ideals inspired by the precepts of Christian Science:

I believe in the motion picture that carries a message to humanity.

I believe in the picture that will help humanity to free itself from the shackles of fear and suffering that have so long bound it in chains.

I will not knowingly produce a picture that contains anything that i do not believe to be absolutely true to human nature, anything that could injure anyone or anything unclean in thought or action.

Nor will I deliberately portray anything to cause fright, suggest fear, glorify mischief, condone cruelty or extenuate malice.

I will never picture evil or wrong, except to prove the fallacy of its line.

So long as I direct pictures, i will make only those founded on the principles of right, and I will endeavor to draw upon the inexhaustible source of good for my stories, my guidance and my inspiration.

A story of human redemption, the protagonists are rewarded with ultimate success, but only after a bitter struggle with nature in a desolate and threatening landscape, reflecting Vidor's own "ambivalence towards nature".

Despite a number of humorous interludes and the happy ending, the overall effect of the film is one of "relentless realism".
