= The Bad Boy (film) =

1917 silent film by Chester Withey

- Directed by: Chester Withey
- Screenplay by: Chester Withey; Frank E. Woods
- Starring: Robert Harron; Richard Henry Cummings; Josephine Crowell; Mildred Harris
- Production company: Fine Arts Film Company
- Distributed by: Triangle Film Corporation
- Release date: February 18, 1917
- Running time: 58 minutes
- Country: United States
- Languages: Silent film English intertitles

The Bad Boy is a lost 1917 American silent crime drama film directed by Chester Withey and starring Robert Harron, Richard Cummings, and Mildred Harris. The film marks the debut of Colleen Moore, who plays a supporting role in the film.

== Plot ==
Small town youth Jimmie Bates is a well-intentioned, but troubled youth. Jimmie is a rowdy boy who is always getting into trouble and playing pranks on his friends and neighbors. Although deeply in love with young Mary, he eventually spurns Mary's affection for the more outgoing and worldly young Ruth.

Eventually, Jimmie's father Mr. Bates, in a fit of exasperation with the boy's antics, beats him severely and Jimmie runs away from home. While on the lam Jimmie becomes involved with a criminal gang of thieves and Jimmie serves a sentence in jail. After completing his sentence, Jimmie vows to turn over a new leaf. However, the gang of thieves decide they are going to rob Jimmie's hometown bank. Jimmie tries desperately to foil the attempt during the robbery and is wounded and arrested by the sheriff as the robbery suspect. Jimmie escapes from jail and seeks out his true love Mary who hides Jimmie at her home and nurses him back to health.

After regaining his strength, Jimmie sets about vindicating himself to his parents and townspeople. Jimmie eventually pursues and captures real perpetrator in his father's yard. After his capture, the criminal finally admits that Jimmie was not a participant in the robbery attempt and Jimmie is finally redeemed in the eyes of his family.

== Cast ==
Role	Actor
Jimmie Bates	Robert Harron
Mr. Bates	Richard Henry Cummings
Mrs. Bates	Josephine Crowell
Mary	Mildred Harris
Town marshal	William H. Brown
Clarence	James Harrison
Ruth	Colleen Moore
Yeggman	Elmo Lincoln
Yeggman	Harry Fisher
Uncredited	Carmel Myers
