= The Velvet Hand =

- Directed by: Douglas Gerrard
- Screenplay by: F. McGrew Willis
- Story by: Edith Barnard Delano
- Starring: Fritzi Brunette; William Conklin; Gino Corrado; F. A. Turner; Wedgwood Nowell; Carmen Phillips
- Cinematography: Victor Milner
- Production company: Bluebird Photoplays, Inc.
- Distributed by: Bluebird Photoplays, Inc.
- Release date: September 30, 1918
- Running time: 50 minutes
- Country: United States
- Language: English

The Velvet Hand is a 1918 American drama film directed by Douglas Gerrard and written by F. McGrew Willis. The film stars Fritzi Brunette, William Conklin, Gino Corrado, F. A. Turner, Wedgwood Nowell and Carmen Phillips. The film was released on September 30, 1918, by Bluebird Photoplays, Inc.

== Cast ==
- Fritzi Brunette as Gianna Russelli
- William Conklin as Count Paul Trovelli
- Gino Corrado as Russino Russelli
- F. A. Turner as Russo Russelli
- Wedgwood Nowell as Prince Visconte
- Carmen Phillips as Countess Michetti
- Nicholas Dunaew as Secretary
