= Frank Bennett (actor) =

American actor

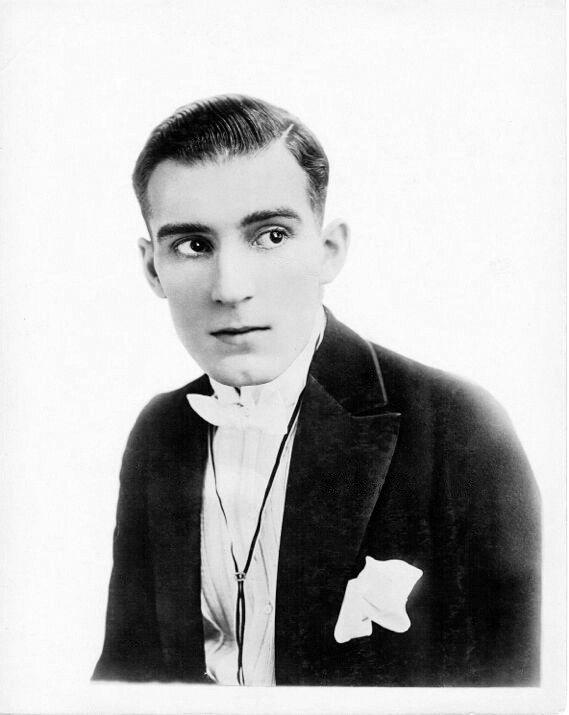
- Bennett in 1916
- Born: Frank Fisher Bennett; September 15, 1890; New York, U.S.
- Died: April 29, 1957 (aged 66); Warren, New Jersey, U.S.
- Occupation: Actor
- Years active: 1912–1919
- Spouse: Billie West

Frank Fisher Bennett (September 15, 1890 – April 29, 1957) was an American film actor active during the silent era. He played the role of Charles IX in D. W. Griffith's 1916 epic Intolerance.

Born in New York, Bennett worked for Vitagraph in New York before he moved to Hollywood with D. W. Griffith.

During World War I, Bennett joined the Army and worked in Washington in the Ordnance Department.

He was married to actress Billie West. After they stopped working in films, they settled in Warren Township, New Jersey, in a home adjacent to his parents' home.

== Filmography ==
Year	Title	Role	Notes
1913	Unto the Third Generation	Goldberg	Short; Lost film
1914	The Dishonored Medal	Bel Khan, Son of Achmed	Lost film
1916	Sold for Marriage	Jan	
1916	Reggie Mixes In	Sammy, the Dude	
1916	Casey at the Bat	The Daughter's Sweetheart	Lost film
1916	Stranded	Hotel Proprietor	Lost film
1916	Gretchen the Greenhorn	Pietro	
1916	Intolerance	Charles IX	
1916	A Sister of Six	Joaquin Sepulveda	Lost film
1916	The Heiress at Coffee Dan's	Carl Miller	Lost film
1917	The Little Yank	Captain Johnnie	
1917	Stage Struck	Jack Martin	
1917	Her Official Fathers	Steven Peabody	Lost film
1917	The Jury of Fate	François Leblanc	Lost film
1917	Lost in Transit	Paolo Marso	Lost film
1918	The Eyes of Mystery	Seth Megget	Lost film
1919	The Man Who Stayed at Home	Carl Sanderson	Lost film
