= Richard Cummings (actor) =

American actor

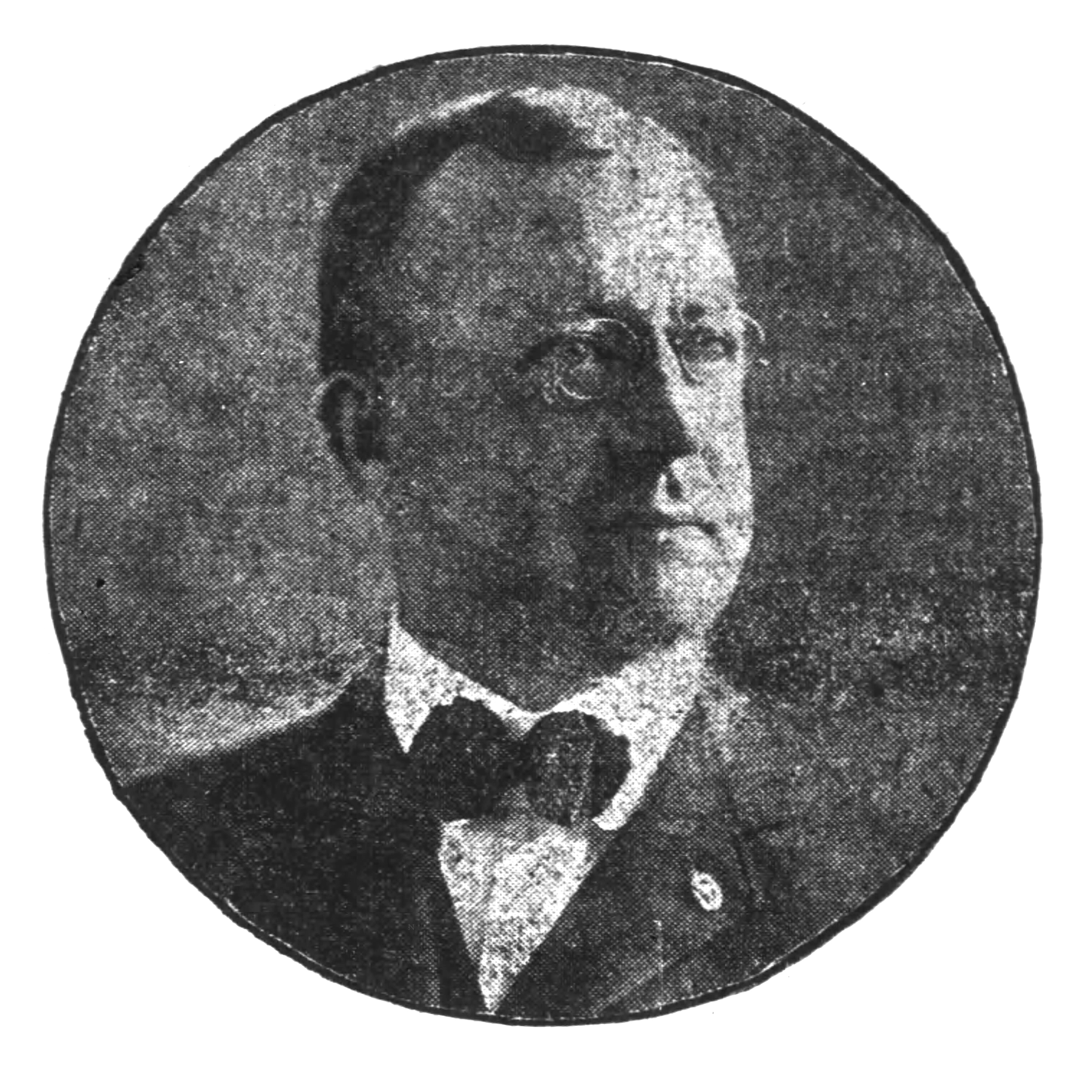
- Born: Richard Henry Cummings; August 20, 1858; New Haven, Connecticut, US
- Died: December 25, 1938 (aged 80); Los Angeles, California, US
- Occupation: Actor
- Years active: 1913–1930

Richard Henry Cummings (August 20, 1858 – December 25, 1938) was an American film actor of the silent era. Cummings performed in vaudeville and on stage before he began working in films. He appeared in more than 80 films between 1913 and 1930. He was born in New Haven, Connecticut, and died in Los Angeles, California.

== Partial filmography ==
- Fate's Decree (1914)
- Double Trouble (1915)
- Daphne and the Pirate (1916)
- The Bad Boy (1917)
- Her Official Fathers (1917)
- A Mormon Maid (1917)
- Reaching for the Moon (1917)
- A Petticoat Pilot (1918)
- Danger, Go Slow (1918)
- Little Comrade (1919)
- The Last Outlaw (1919)
- Blind Husbands (1919)
- Common Property (1919)
- The Valley of the Giants (1919)
- The Delicious Little Devil (1919)
- The Adorable Savage (1920)
- The Prince of Avenue A (1920)
- Pinto (1920)
- The City of Masks (1920)
- What Happened to Jones (1920)
- Red Courage (1921)
- Partners of Fate (1921)
- No Woman Knows (1921)
- Bride's Play (1922)
- The Great Alone (1922)
- Wolf Law (1922)
- Top o' the Morning (1922)
- Thundergate (1923)
- Itching Palms (1923)
- Thank You (1925)
- The Galloping Cowboy (1926)
- Old Gray Hoss (1928)
- West of Zanzibar (1928)
- The Social Lion (1930)
