= The Little Yank =

1917 silent historical ilm

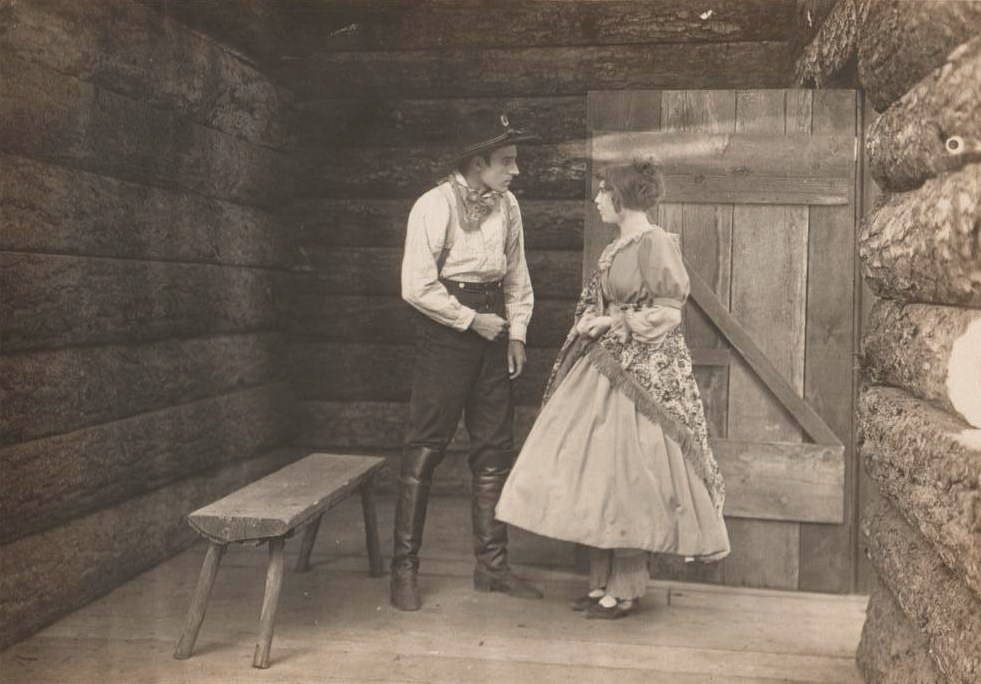
- Directed by: George Siegmann
- Written by: Roy Somerville
- Starring: Dorothy Gish; Frank Bennett; Bob Burns
- Production company: Fine Arts Film Company
- Distributed by: Triangle Distributing
- Release date: January 14, 1917
- Running time: 50 minutes
- Country: United States
- Languages: Silent; English intertitles

The Little Yank is a 1917 American silent historical drama film directed by George Siegmann and starring Dorothy Gish, Frank Bennett and Bob Burns. The film is set in Kentucky during the American Civil War.

== Cast ==
- Dorothy Gish as Sallie Castleton
- Frank Bennett as Captain Johnnie
- Bob Burns as Lieut. James Castleton
- Alberta Lee as Mrs. Castleton
- Allan Sears as Major Rushton
- Kate Toncray as Mrs. Carver
- F.A. Turner as Wilson Carver
- Hal Wilson as Mose

== See also ==
- List of films and television shows about the American Civil War

== Bibliography ==
- Langman, Larry. American Film Cycles: The Silent Era. Greenwood Publishing, 1998.
