= The Sable Lorcha =

1912 novel by Horace Hazeltine

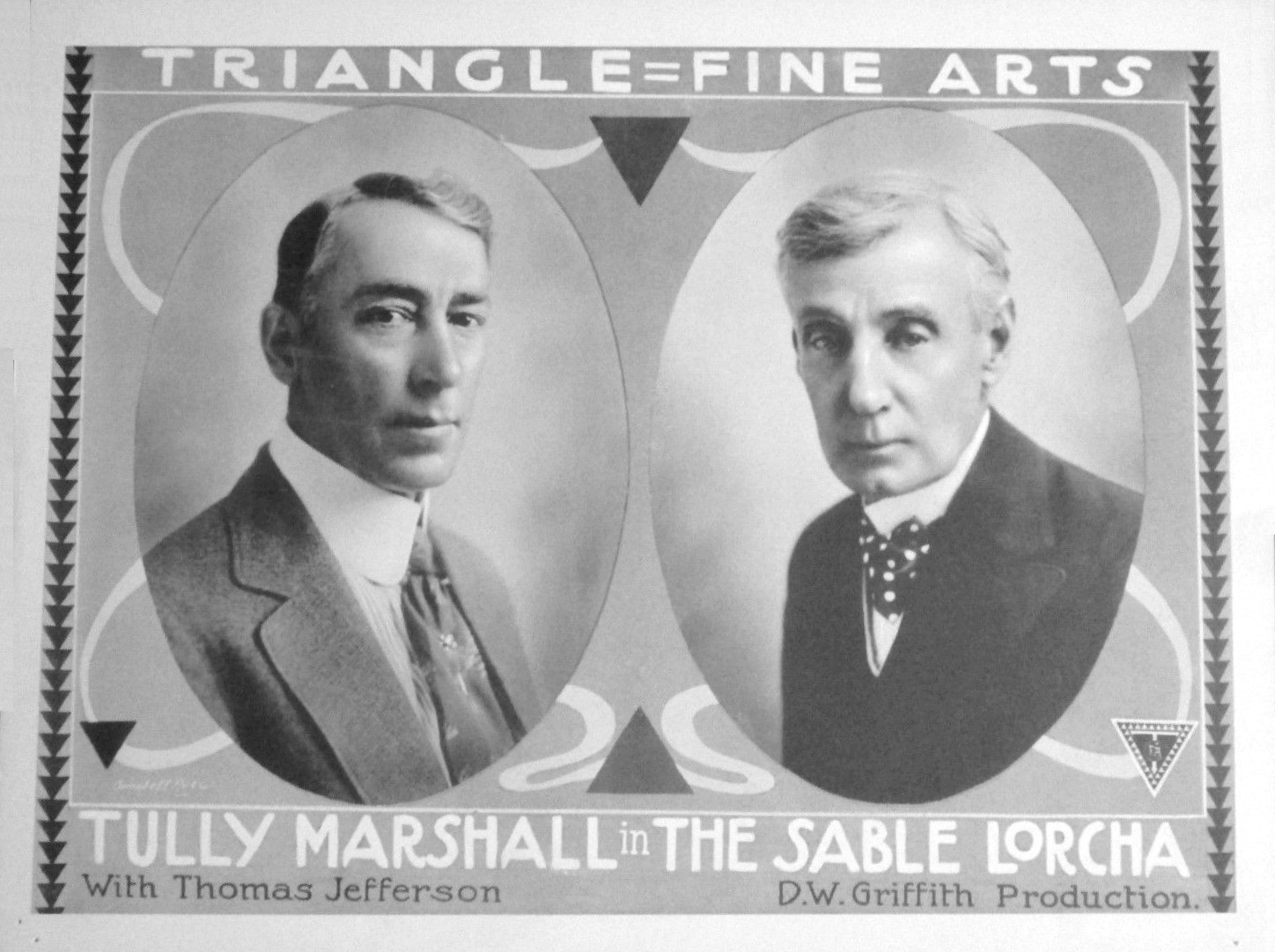
Lobby card for The Sable Lorcha

The Sable Lorcha is a novel by Horace Hazeltine that was adapted into a 1915 silent film produced by D. W. Griffith. The story features two long-separated brothers, murder, vengeance, and a kidnapping. The film starred Tully Marshall.

== Book ==
The book was published by A. C. McLurg & Co. in 1912. A contemporary review in the San Francisco Call states that the excitement never flags and it is well written, though requiring some suspension of disbelief. It includes Illustrations by J. J. Gould.

== Film ==
The film was a Reliance-Majestic Studios production, directed by Lloyd Ingraham and the scenario writer was Chester B. Clapp. It starred Tully Marshall, Thomas Jefferson (actor), Charles Lee (actor), Elmer Clifton, Loretta Blake, George C. Pearce, Hal Wilson, Raymond Wells, Earle Raymond, and Henry Kotani. Cinematographers were Henry Kotani and Hugh McClung. D. W. Griffith supervised the production. Composer J. A. Raynes composed theatre organ music to accompany this film.

== Plot ==
Robert and Donald Cameron are twins in a Scottish family which is separated by the death of the mother. Robert is brought to America by his father, and Donald is adopted by a family named McNish. Robert prospers in the new land, but Donald goes to the bad, runs away to sea and becomes a smuggler of Chinese to America. On one of his expeditions he scuttles a junk, or Lorcha, and a hundred Chinese perish. The only survivor is the cook, a half-breed, John Soy. Soy and an Irish soldier of fortune. Murphy, aid the kinsmen of the dead in a world-wide search for McNish.

One day Murphy sees Cameron, mistakes him for his brother, McNish, and puts the avengers on his track. Cameron, who has a fine Connecticut estate, receives a warning from the Chinese, the only signature being a silhouette of the Sable Lorcha, or funeral ship. Apparently before his very eyes his portrait has been beheaded. A second warning is received. Cameron at once sends for a young friend and neighbor, Phillip Clyde, who is in love with Cameron's niece and ward, Evelyn Grayson. The second threat is carried out by the crashing to atoms of a mirror by unseen hands. Cameron and Clyde are mystified as a third threat comes, declaring that before the morning of the third day Cameron will pass from sight of man. The two men go to sea in a yacht, but the avengers follow in a fast tug, drop Soy in an open boat in the yacht's course and put their man on board when he is picked up in the belief that he is a castaway fisherman. Soy now uses a Chinese anaesthetic with which he has performed the other two mysteries. Cameron and Clyde are rendered unconscious and the former is taken off to the tug. In a box the doomed man is taken to Chinatown, where revenge is to be obtained. Later Clyde comes ashore, meets Soy by chance, and follows him to a Chinatown cellar. There a box is found similar to the one in which Cameron is being taken from the yacht. It contains nothing, however, but Chinese merchandise, and while Clyde goes to seek aid from the police the box containing Cameron is taken away.

Meanwhile, in front of Cameron's Fifth Avenue mansion, appears an unkempt and sickly individual who later is found to be McNish. He has escaped from two Chinamen who thought he was Cameron. The police follow one of the avengers to a house in Chinatown, where a large tank has been prepared and Cameron is to be bound while the water rises and brings slow torture and death. They arrive with McNish in time to reveal the error of the Chinese and McNish, the guilty one, dies. Thus is solved the mystery of "The Sable Lorcha.
