= New York Luck =

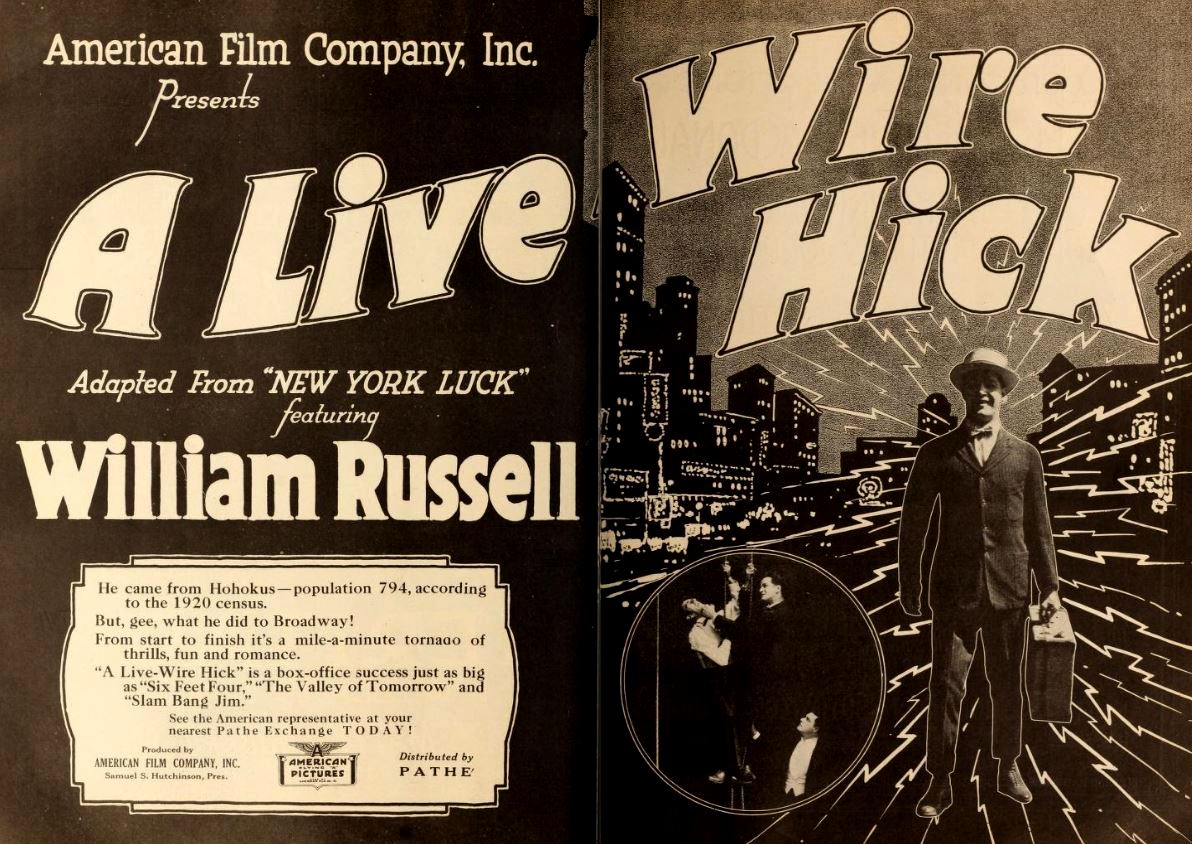
- Advertisement for the film
- Directed by: Edward Sloman
- Screenplay by: Chester Blinn Clapp
- Story by: Charles Dazey; Frank Dazey
- Starring: William Russell; Francelia Billington; Harvey Clark; Clarence Burton
- Cinematography: Joe Morgan
- Production company: American Film Company
- Distributed by: Mutual Film
- Release date: December 17, 1917
- Running time: 5 reels
- Country: United States
- Language: Silent (English intertitles)

New York Luck is a lost American silent drama film written by Charles T. Dazey and Frank Dazey. It was described as a "romantic adventure in the great metropolis." Chester B. Clapp wrote the screenplay. It was produced by American Film Company.

Russell portrays a character hailing from Hohokus, Maine "trying to make his dreams come true in the wholly baffling New York." The Press of Atlantic City called it William Russell's best film. The Atlanta Constitution called the film "unusually clever".

== Cast ==
- William Russell as Nick Fowler
- Francelia Billington as Gwendolyn Van Loon
- Harvey Clark as Dad Fowler
- Clarence Burton as Jimmie Keen
- Edward Peil as Steve Diamond
- Alfred Ferguson as Lord Boniface Cheadle
- Frederick Vroom as Peter Van Loon
- Carl Stockdale as Palter

== Gallery ==
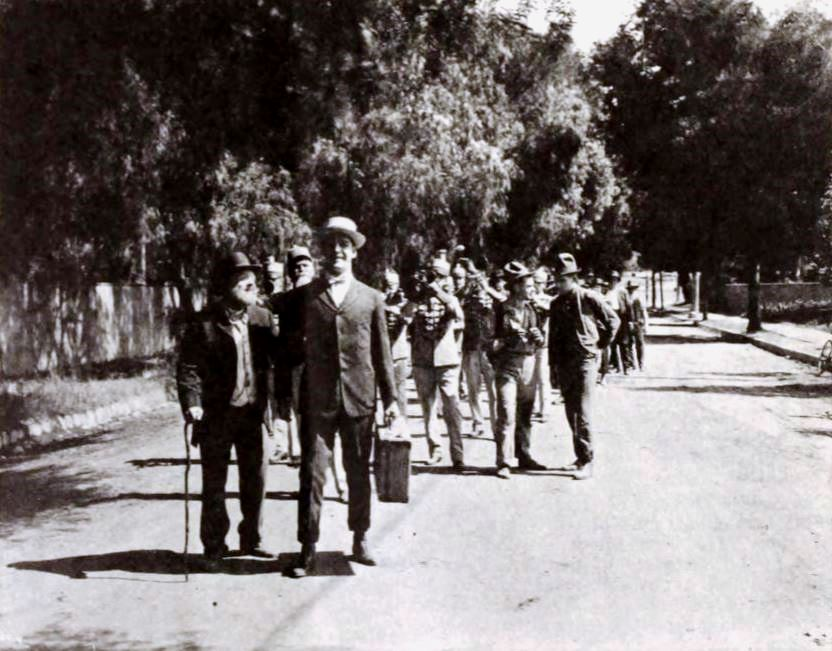

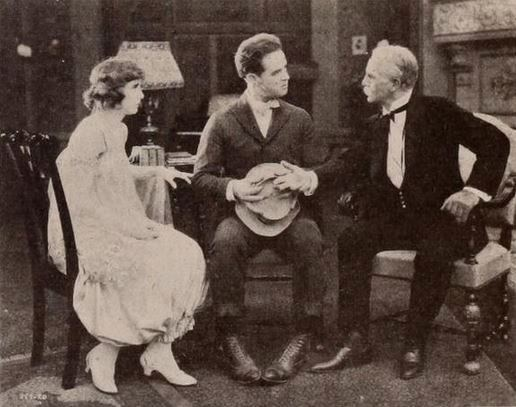

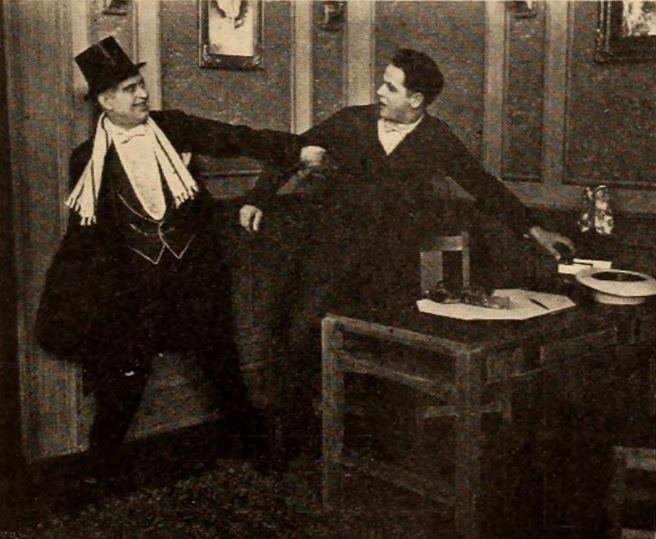
