= F. A. Turner =

American actor

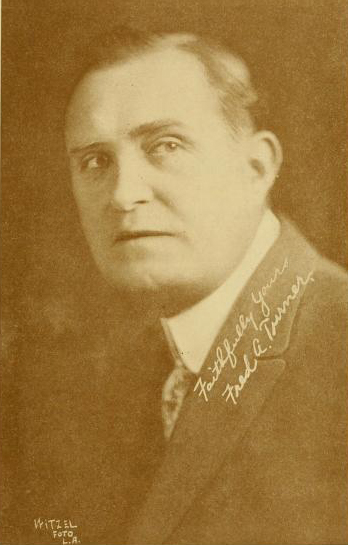
- Turner in 1915
- Born: Frederick A. Turner; October 12, 1858; New York City, United States
- Died: February 13, 1923 (aged 64)
- Occupation: Actor
- Years active: 1914-1922

F. A. Turner (October 12, 1858 – February 13, 1923) was an American actor of the stage and of the silent era. He appeared in more than 60 films between 1914 and 1922. He was born in New York City. He is sometimes billed as Fred Turner.

== Partial filmography ==
- The Hunchback (1914, Short) - A Hunchback Peddler
- The Quicksands (1914, Short)
- The Life of General Villa (1914) - American girl's father
- Home, Sweet Home (1914)
- The Escape (1914) - Jim Joyce
- The Next in Command (1914) - Pvt. Nolan
- The Lost House (1915, Short) - Dosia's Uncle
- A Man and His Mate (1915) - The Colonel - Betty's Father
- The Outlaw's Revenge (1915) - The American Girl's Father
- The Living Death (1915, Short) - Dr. Farrell
- The Burned Hand (1915, Short)
- The Woman from Warren's (1915, Short) - Fred Thompson
- The Penitentes (1915) - Father Rossi
- Acquitted (1916) - Police Captain
- Little Meena's Romance (1916) - Meena's Uncle
- Susan Rocks the Boat (1916) - Jasper Thornton
- The Devil's Needle (1916) - Marshall Devon
- Intolerance (1916) - The Dear One's Father
- Atta Boy's Last Race (1916) - Phil Strong
- The Microscope Mystery (1916) - Ira Dayton
- The Children of the Feud (1916) - Judge Lee Cavanagh
- The Little Yank (1917) - Wilson Carver
- A Girl of the Timber Claims (1917) - Jess's Father
- A Love Sublime (1917) - The Professor
- Her Official Fathers (1917) - John Webster
- Madame Bo-Peep (1917) - Colonel Beaupree
- Rebecca of Sunnybrook Farm (1917) - Mr. Simpson
- Aladdin and the Wonderful Lamp (1917) - Mustapha - the Tailor
- Restitution (1918) - Herod
- The Love Swindle (1918) - Minor Role (uncredited)
- Playthings (1918) - Jim Carter
- The Velvet Hand (1918) - Russo Russelli
- She Hired a Husband (1918) - Colonel Dunstan
- The Heart of Wetona (1919) - Pastor David Wells
- As the Sun Went Down (1919) - Gerald Morton
- The Mother and the Law (1919) - The Girl's Father
- The Miracle Man (1919) - Mr. Higgins
- Bonnie Bonnie Lassie (1919)
- Peg o' My Heart (1919)
- Terror Island (1920) - Mr. West
- The Jack-Knife Man (1920) - Peter Lane
- Eyes of the Heart (1920) - Dr. Dewey
- The Furnace (1920) - Albert Vallance
- The Witching Hour (1921) - Lew Ellinger
- Tropical Love (1921) - The Seeker
- Through a Glass Window (1922) - Matt Clancy
