= Casey at the Bat (1916 film) =

1916 directed by Lloyd Ingraham

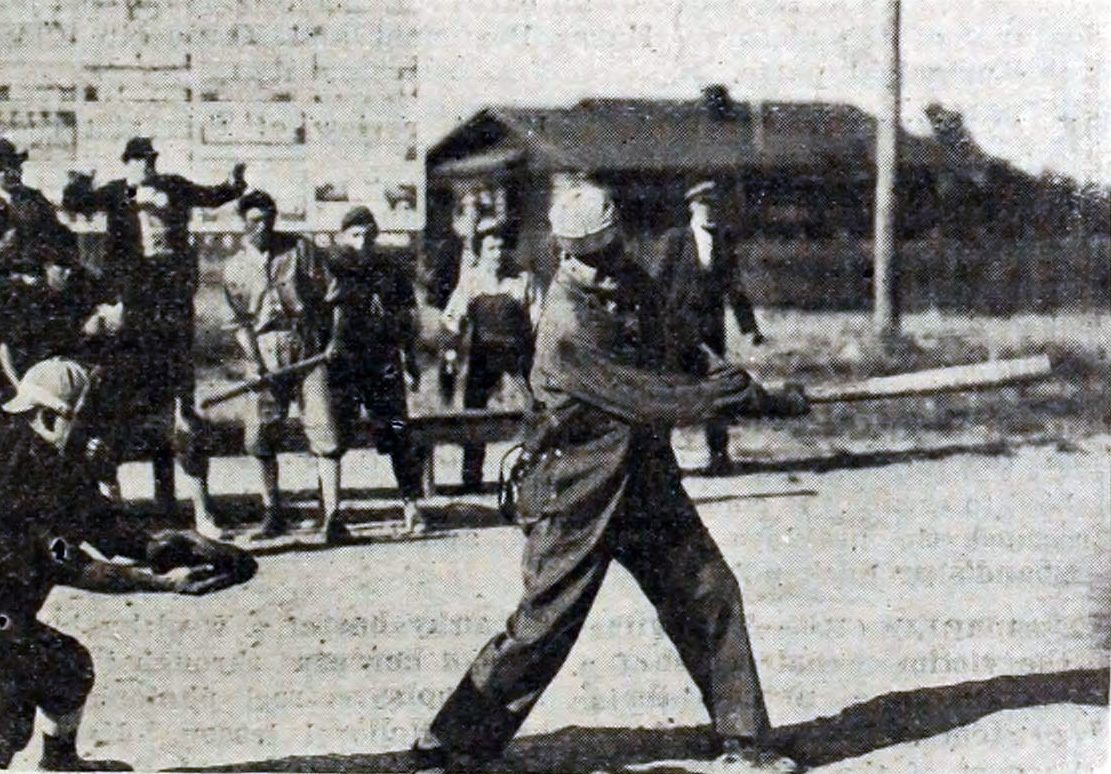
- Casey (DeWolf Hopper) in batting practice before the big game against Frogtown
- Directed by: Lloyd Ingraham
- Written by: William E. Wing (scenario)
- Based on: "Casey at the Bat" by Ernest Thayer, 1888
- Starring: DeWolf Hopper
- Production company: Fine Arts Studios
- Distributed by: Triangle Film Corporation
- Release date: July 2, 1916
- Running time: 5 reels (55-65 minutes)
- Country: United States
- Language: Silent (English intertitles)

Casey at the Bat is a lost 1916 American silent sports drama film produced by Fine Arts Studios in Hollywood, directed by Lloyd Ingraham, and starring DeWolf Hopper with principal support from Marguerite Marsh, Frank Bennett, and Kate Toncray. The photoplay's scenario, written by William E. Wing, was based on Ernest Thayer's 1888 baseball poem of the same title.

The Library of Congress includes the film among the National Film Preservation Board's list of "7,200 Lost U.S. Silent Feature Films" produced between 1912 and 1929.

== Plot ==
As he is characterized in Ernest Thayer's poem, Casey in this film was a "mighty" baseball player, the star and leading hitter of the town of Mudville's team. The motion picture's storyline, however, as described in 1916 reviews and news items, expanded considerably on Casey's personal life outside of baseball. He is portrayed living at the house of his sister and brother-in-law and working as a clerk and "errand boy" at Hicks' General Store in Mudville. Although he is a baseball hero in his community, Casey away from the playing field has few friends or admirers due to his clumsy, coarse behavior. Only a "half-witted" man and the town's little children like the giant-sized athlete. Among the latter is Casey's six-year-old niece to whom he is deeply devoted.

Despite his unattractive appearance and social ineptness, Casey is infatuated with a pretty, young woman in town, Angevine Blodgett. She is the daughter of the local judge, is cordial to Casey whenever she sees him at the general store or elsewhere in public, but she is in love with Bert Collins, a handsome "college man" she hopes to marry. Collins is also a skillful pitcher on the baseball team of Mudville's bitter sports rival, Frogtown.

Central to the film's story is a three-game series of baseball contests between Mudville and Frogtown. Mudville wins the first game thanks to Casey's hitting and fielding, but Frogtown wins the next one because Casey is unable to play due to burning his hands while preventing a fire at a community dance. By the time Mudville hosts the decisive third game against Frogtown, Casey is sufficiently healed to play. Unfortunately, his niece is seriously injured that same day when she falls out of a tree. Refusing to leave her bedside as she is being treated by the town doctor, Casey misses the start of the game. Later he hears townfolk calling for him, so he finally decides he must play and instructs his friend to stay with the girl. When Casey arrives at the ballpark, the game is in the bottom half of the ninth inning and Mudville has two men on base, trails by two runs, and is only one out from losing the series. Casey now steps into the batter's box, and the crowd's excitement grows, for the partisan spectators are confident the game will now be won by their home-run hero. Casey allows Frogtown's pitcher to throw two strikes against him, but just as the third pitch is being thrown, the slugger suddenly sees his friend arrive in the ballpark. Thinking he has come to the game with bad news about his niece, a distracted Casey swings and misses the pitch, striking out. After the game Casey is relieved to learn that the girl is better and will recover. Mudville's residents, angry about the loss, blame and shun their former hero. Humiliated and dejected, Casey returns to his sister's house, bundles up his few possessions, and then walks out of town along the railroad tracks, leaving Mudville forever.

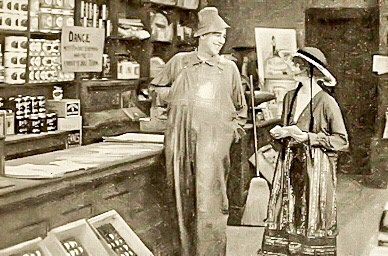
Film still of Casey (Hopper) talking to Angevine (Marguerite Marsh) in Hicks' General Store in Mudville

== Cast ==
- DeWolf Hopper as Casey
- Marguerite Marsh as Angevine Blodgett, the judge's daughter
- Frank Bennett as Bert Collins, Angevine's sweetheart
- Kate Toncray as Casey's sister
- Mae Giraci as Casey's niece (credited May Garcia)
- Carl Stockdale as Hicks, the general store owner
- William H. Brown as Judge Blodgett
- Robert Lawler as politician
- Bert Hadley as Casey's brother-in-Law
- Hal Wilson as doctor
- Frank Hughes as the "half-wit" friend of Casey

== Production ==
In the spring of 1916, during pre-production, news reports indicated that Lloyd Ingraham was not Triangle Film Corporation's initial choice to direct the five-reeler. The Los Angeles Times in its April 16 issue—less than two weeks before filming began—announces that DeWolf Hopper was already busy "practicing sincere baseball every morning" and that Edward "Eddie" Dillon would be "directing both the baseball [practice] and the picture." A change in the film's leadership was made soon after the Los Angeles newspaper's announcement, for the trade journal Motion Picture News soon reported that the production "is now in the hands of Director Lloyd Ingraham".

=== Casting title character ===
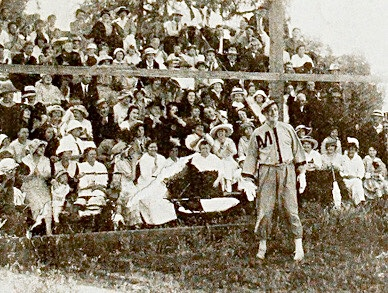
Still of an injured Casey, who looked "like a giant" in his Mudville uniform, watching his team lose Game 2 to Frogtown

Casting DeWolf Hopper in the title role proved publicly to be a popular choice, one predicted to be "a very excellent subject" given Hopper's lengthy association with the fictional baseball player. For many years the towering 6-foot-5-inch actor, singer and comedy star of vaudeville and musical theater had become inextricably linked to Thayer's poem, which by 1916 he had recited on many occasions on stage and at special events across the country. Triangle Film Corporation in 1915 had contracted Hopper for one year for $102,000 to play the lead in several screen projects planned by the company. One of those projects, despite the actor's advanced age, included Casey at the Bat. While Hopper was a knowledgeable and "most enthusiastic baseball fan", he was over 58 years old by the time production began, an age far past the normal retirement age of professional and even amateur baseball players. Excellent makeup used on the star in filming apparently succeeded in making the actor appear appreciably younger in screen tests. Early in production, Grace Kingsley of the Los Angeles Times reported, "Hopper's makeup as Casey is said to be attracting a great deal of attention and admiration at the Fine Arts studio."

=== Filming and staging baseball games ===
The production was filmed in approximately three weeks, between the final days of April 1916 and May 20. The scenes of the three baseball games portrayed in the film were shot outside the city of Los Angeles, at the nearby community of Lankershim, which in 1927 would be renamed North Hollywood. Director Ingraham hired a "former professional baseball player" to rehearse the cast there in batting and fielding and to assist in directing the actual filming of gameplay. In newspaper interviews about the production, DeWolf Hopper described the baseball location's setup: "We rented a little ball park out in Lankershim and the local folks turned out in force to fill the grandstand and bleachers." According to him, "The teams were made up partly from Lankershim players, partly from Fine Arts players, and they were good teams."

== Release and promotion ==
"Casey at the Bat"
Recited by DeWolf Hopper, recorded c. 1920, a few years after the release of this film. (Wait for delayed start.)
Audio 00:04:38

In New York City on July 2, 1916—the day of the film's official release—the publicity bureau of Triangle Arts arranged at a Broadway theater a special screening of Casey at the Bat for teams of the city's baseball league. Prior to the projection of his new film in New York, DeWolf Hopper in California recited Thayer's poem to the ball players by telephone, using a long-distant connection from a private dining room located at the Alexandria Hotel in Los Angeles. In his introductory remarks, Hopper "declared" that the occasion marked his 1,647th public performance of "Casey at the Bat". Staff of Picture-Play Magazine later reported that after hearing the actor's recitation, the audience marveled at the clarity of the telephone connection, at how they "were able to understand every syllable" of Hopper's melodramatic delivery.

In advertisements and news items promoting the film, the publicity lure used by Triangle Film Corporation to attract theatergoers was to assure them that the picture explained the ending of Thayer's poem. In Hartford, Connecticut, for example, the local newspaper's announcement of the film's screening was typical of the promotion: "For the first time the world learns why Casey struck out in the final game between Mudville and Frogtown. Motion Picture News was one of several trade publications that even in May, before the film's release, circulated the same lure, "The punch of this story for the screen, which was prepared by William E. Wing, reveals the cause of missing the flying sphere, which is indeed a great sacrifice."

== Reception ==
The film received generally mixed reviews during the weeks after its release. Oscar Cooper, writing for Motion Picture News, praised the scenarist's and director's success "in putting a lot of excellent small-town stuff on the screen, as well as in working up the three baseball games in a really dramatic way." The entertainment weekly The New York Clipper was another publication that complimented Wing's adaptation of Thayer's original work, noting that he had "elaborated quite successfully on the poem, and turned out a good screen story". In the July 8, 1916 issue of The Chicago Daily Tribune, reviewer Kitty Kelly agrees to some extent with The New York Clipper's assessment. "It is no great feat of phototelling, she writes, "but it is vastly interesting because it has so much humanity in it, with never a bit of hectic emotionalism so dominant in a large percentage of celluloid production."

The New York-based trade paper Variety, however, was a harsh critic of the release. The widely read publication found the plot, structure, and execution of the production wholly deficient in quality. In its June 23 edition, Variety not only finds fault with DeWolf Hopper's performance and with his physical appearance on screen, but it also insists that Wing's script and the film's presentation as a drama were ill-conceived:

...this Triangle-Fine Arts feature is just another example of a good idea gone wrong. "Casey at the Bat" has been a standby of Mr. Hopper's in recitative form for many years. It should have made a corking subject for a comedy picture, but William Everett Wing, who adapted the scenario, saw fit to make a cheap mushy heart thriller of the story and the result was that the tale, coupled with Mr. Hopper, who failed utterly to look the part, and who acted it extremely badly, did not turn out at all in the manner that one assumed it would from the title. As a feature film "Casey at the Bat" will fall short of expectations, although the title will attract money.

== "Lost" film status ==
This 1916 adaptation was one of a least a half dozen films released between 1899 and 1927 that were inspired by Thayer's poem. No full prints or partial reels of the Triangle Film Corporation's production are preserved in the Library of Congress, the UCLA Film Archives, in the collection of moving images at the Museum of Modern Art, the George Eastman Museum, or in European film repositories. In its 2019 list of lost feature films released in the United States between 1912 and 1929, the Library of Congress includes the 1916 release of Casey at the Bat. Stills from the production, in addition to those depicted on this page, do survive as illustrations in reviews and news items in 1916 trade publications and provide a visual record of the general content of some scenes in the film.

== See also ==
- "Casey at the Bat: A Ballad of the Republic Sung in the Year 1888"
- Breaking into the Big League (1913)
- List of baseball films
