= The Woman from Warren's =

1915 film

- Directed by: Tod Browning
- Starring: Billy Hutton; F. A. Turner
- Release date: June 20, 1915
- Running time: 2 reels
- Country: United States
- Language: Silent with English intertitles

The Woman from Warren's is a 1915 American short drama film directed by Tod Browning.

== Cast ==
- Billy Hutton as Alice Thompson
- F. A. Turner as Fred Thompson (as Fred A. Turner)
- Charles West as Hanson Landing
- Lucille Young as Wynona Ware
