= Acquitted (1916 film) =

1916 film by Paul Powell

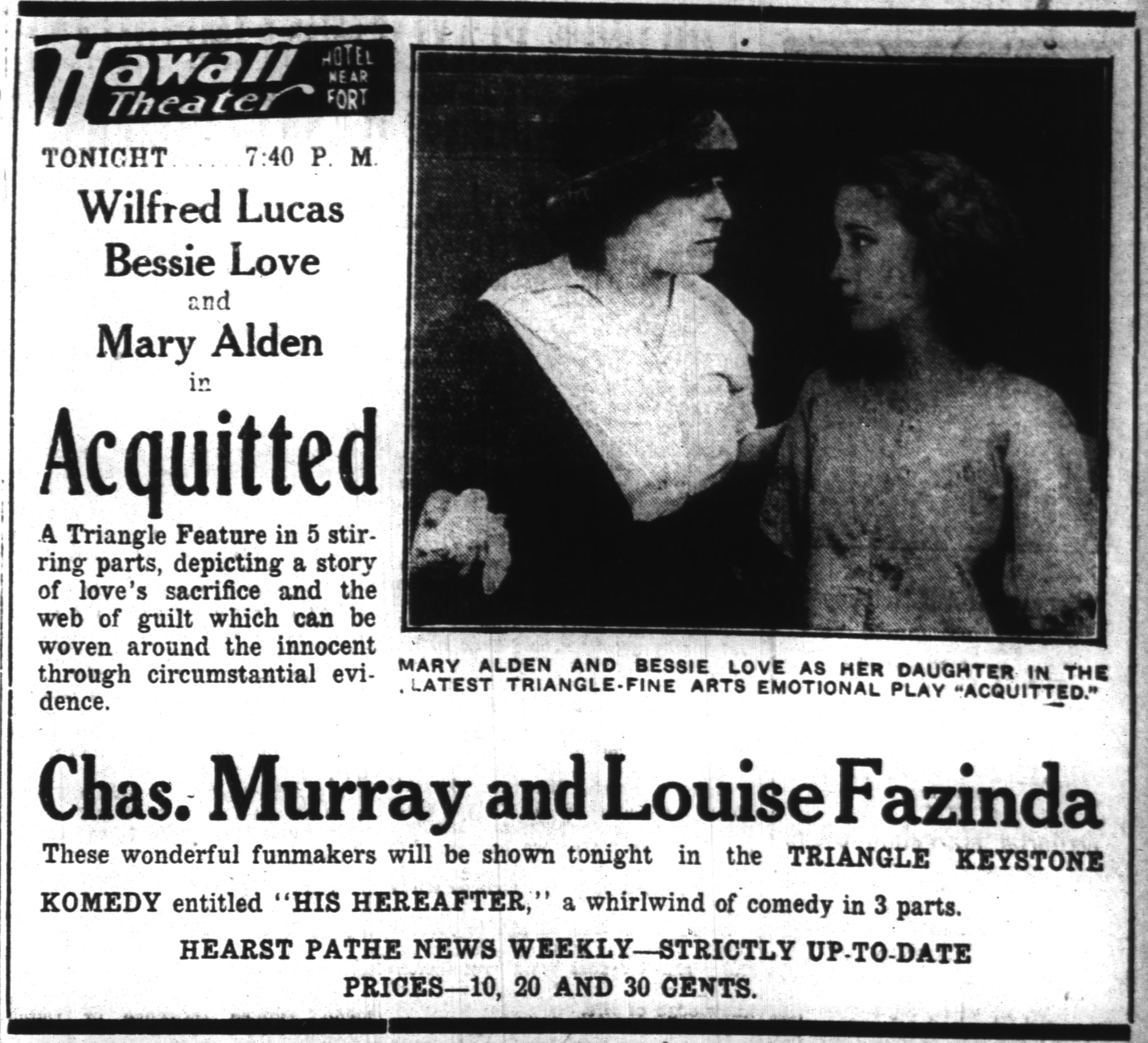
- Newspaper advertisement
- Directed by: Paul Powell
- Written by: Roy Somerville; Tod Browning (uncredited)
- Based on: "Acquitted" by Mary Roberts Rinehart
- Starring: Wilfred Lucas; Mary Alden; Bessie Love
- Cinematography: John Leezer
- Production company: Fine Arts Film Company
- Distributed by: Triangle Film Corporation
- Release date: February 6, 1916 (U.S.)
- Running time: 5 reels
- Country: United States
- Language: Silent (English intertitles)

Acquitted is a 1916 American silent mystery film produced by the Fine Arts Film Company and distributed by Triangle Film Corporation. Paul Powell directed a screenplay by Roy Somerville based on a 1907 short story by Mary Roberts Rinehart. Tod Browning served as an uncredited writer.

This film marks the first starring role of Wilfred Lucas, and may mark Bessie Love's film debut. The film is presumed lost, possibly due to the 1965 MGM vault fire.

== Plot ==
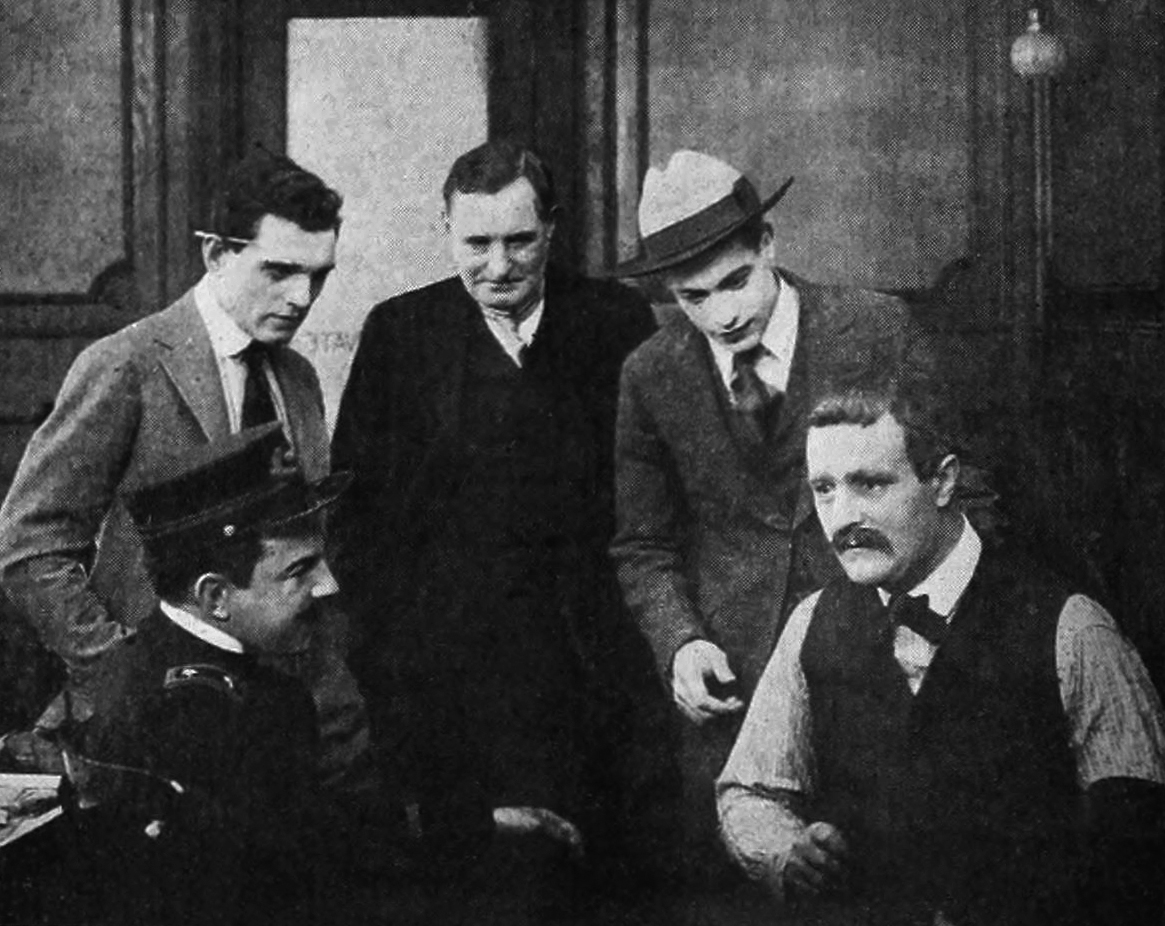
John Carter (Lucas) is interviewed by the police.

The police accuse innocent bookkeeper John Carter of having murdered a cashier. A reporter, who is in love with Carter's daughter, proves that Carter is innocent. After a time, Carter's daughter convinces his former employer to hire him back.

== Cast ==
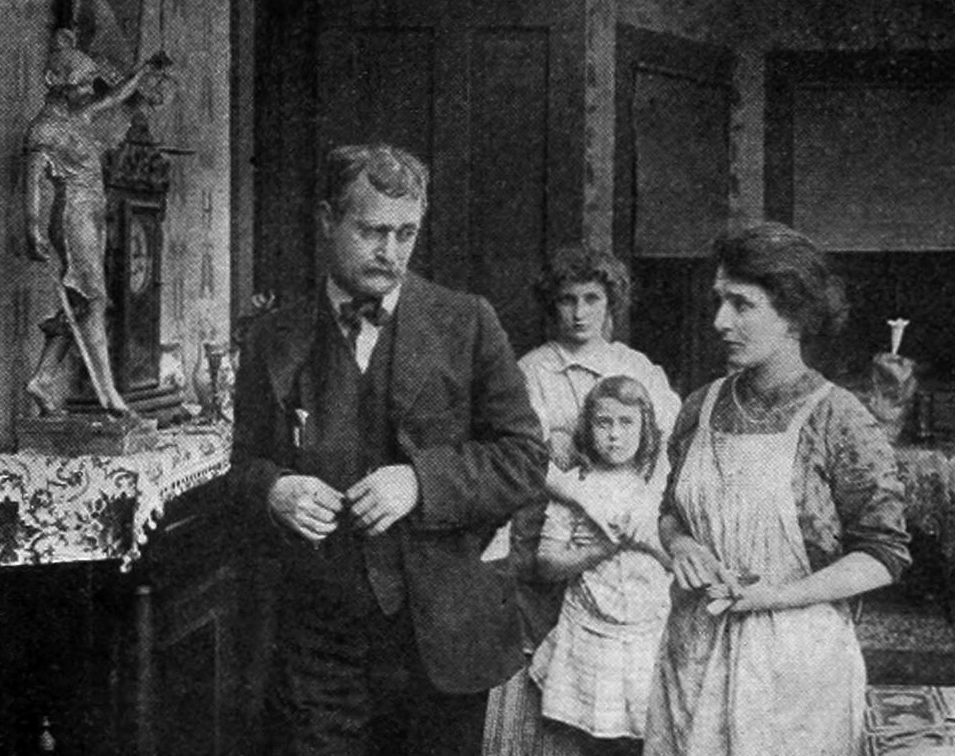
Film still showing the Carter family (Lucas, Love, De Rue, and Alden).

- Wilfred Lucas as John Carter
- Mary Alden as Mrs. Carter
- Bessie Love as Helen Carter
- Carmen De Rue as Nellie Carter
- Elmer Clifton as Ned Fowler
- Sam de Grasse as Ira Wolcott
- W.J. Freemont as The Night Watchman
- Spottiswoode Aitken as Charles Ryder
- James O'Shea as The Police Chief
- F.A. Turner as The Police Captain

== Production ==
Bessie Love wore some of her own clothing as her wardrobe in the film.

== Release and reception ==
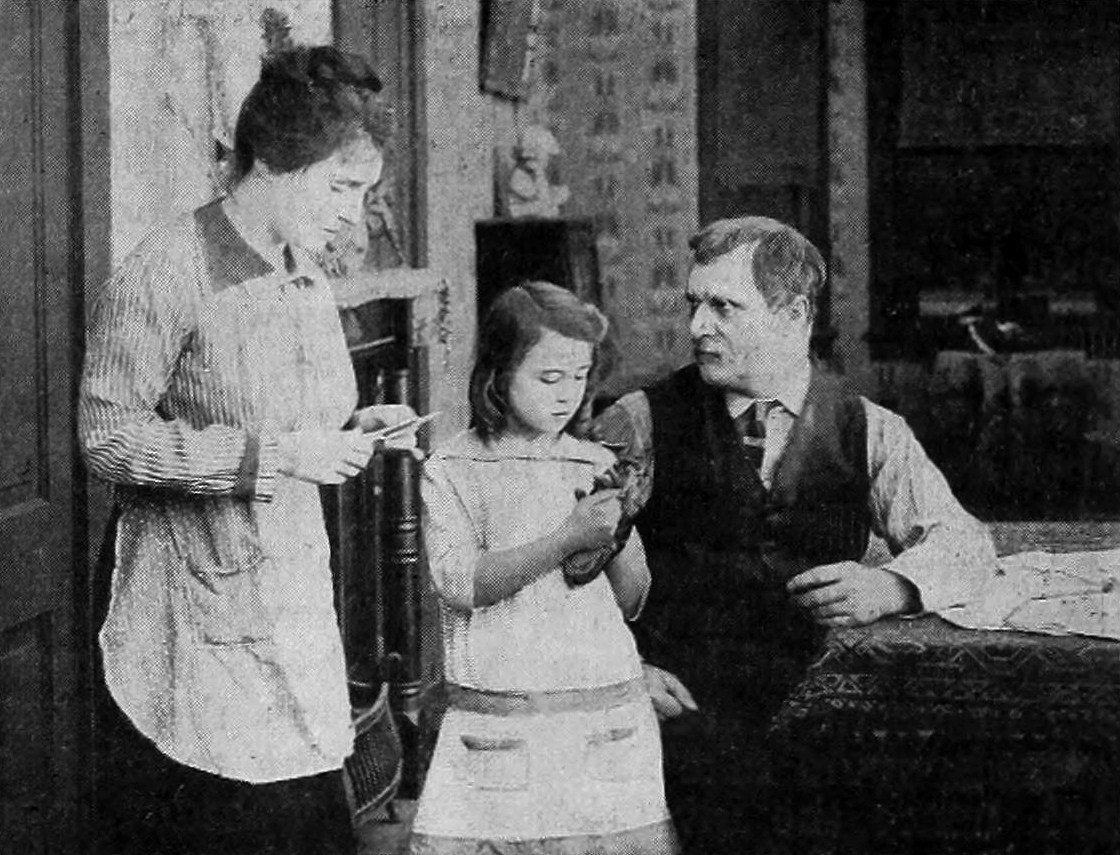
Film still featuring Alden, De Rue, and Lucas.

The film was heavily censored in Ohio, with scenes of violence and drug sales and use removed before distribution.

The film was well-reviewed. Wilfred Lucas received positive reviews for his performance in the lead role, as did Powell's direction. Bessie Love was positively likened to her contemporaries Mary Pickford and Mae Marsh.
