= Stranded (1916 drama film) =

1916 silent film by Lloyd Ingraham

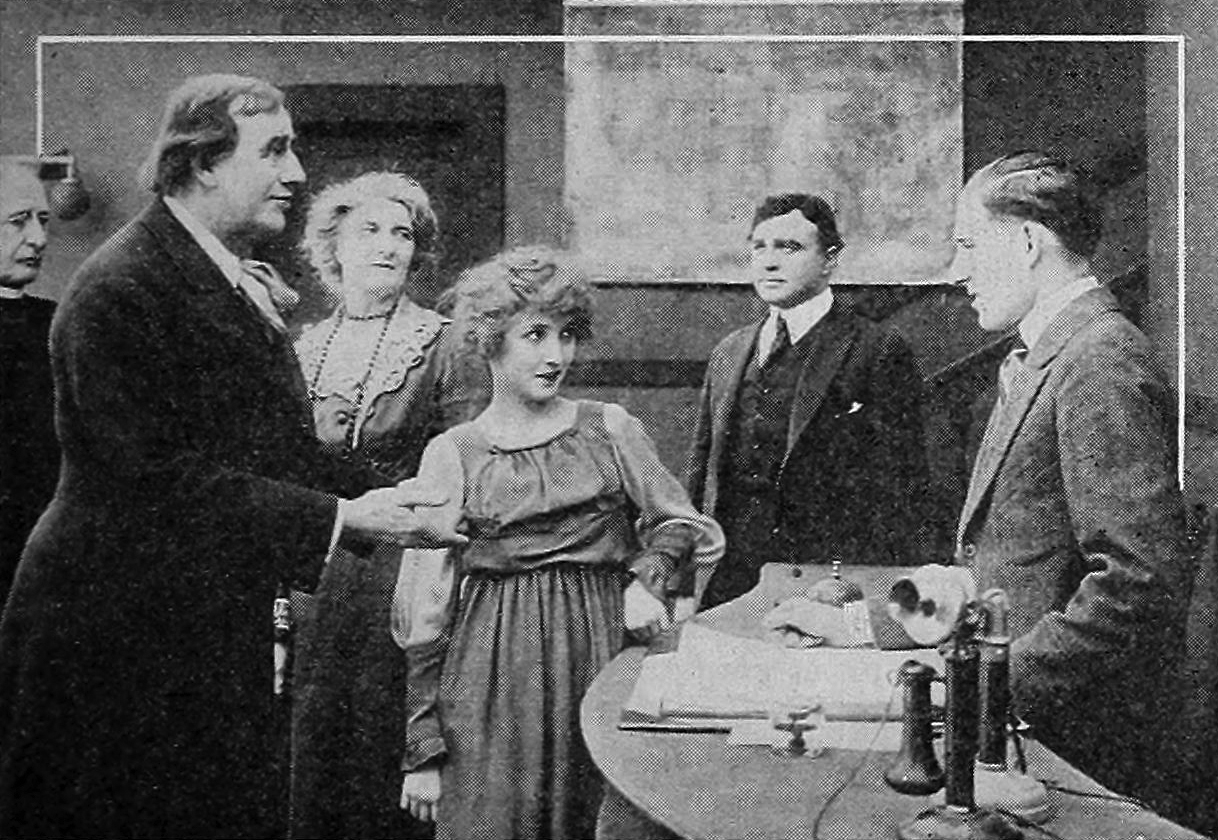
- H. Ulysses Watts (Hopper) and his ward (Love) meet the hotel proprietor (Bennett)
- Directed by: Lloyd Ingraham
- Written by: Anita Loos
- Starring: DeWolf Hopper
- Cinematography: Frank Urson
- Production company: Fine Arts Film Company
- Distributed by: Triangle Film Corporation
- Release date: July 23, 1916 (U.S.)
- Running time: 5 reels
- Country: United States
- Language: Silent (English intertitles)

Stranded is a 1916 American silent drama film produced by Fine Arts Film Company and distributed by Triangle Film Corporation. The film stars DeWolf Hopper with newcomer Bessie Love in a supporting role. The film is considered lost.

== Plot ==
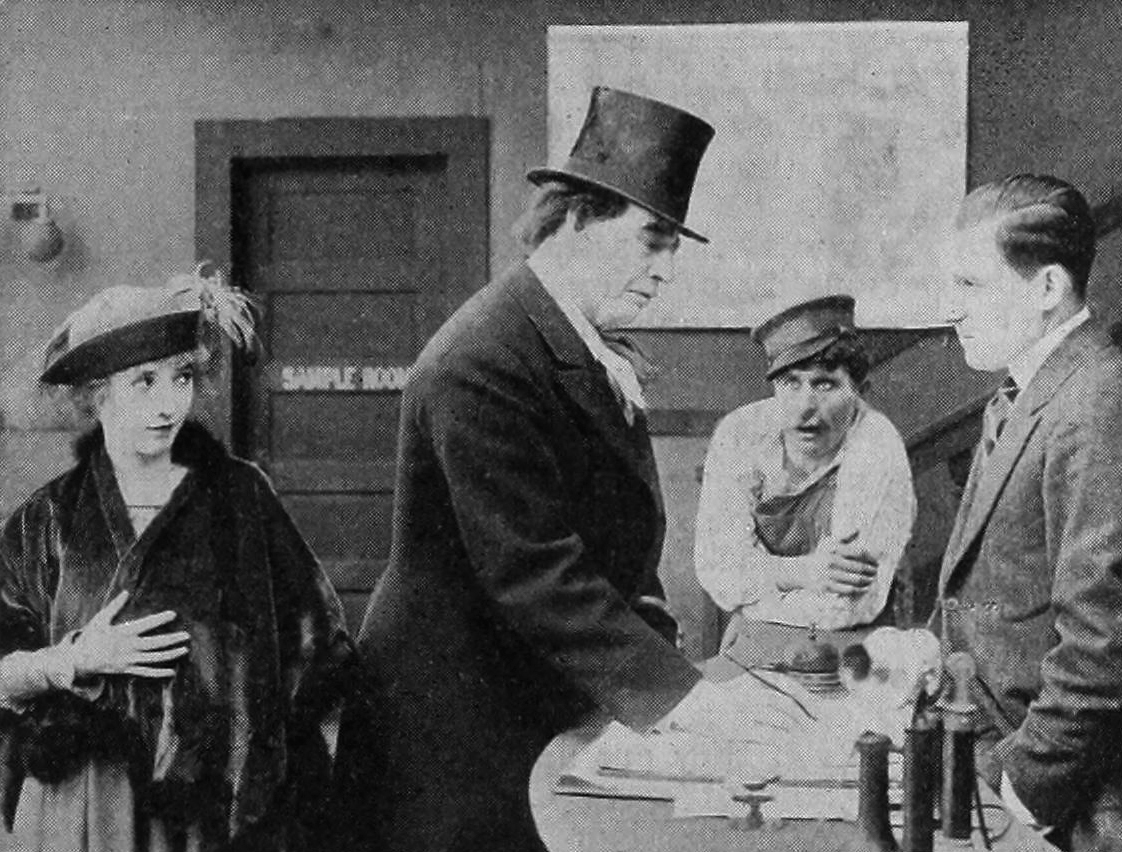
Bessie Love and DeWolf Hopper check into the hotel

H. Ulysses Watts is a traveling Shakespearean actor whose career is on the decline, as his audiences are more interested in cinema and vaudeville. When the troupe is robbed by Stoner, Watts cares for an injured young trapeze artist, and pretends to be her father so that he can protect her.

While healing in the village, the girl falls in love with a hotel manager, and they plan to marry. However, Stoner returns and threatens to reveal her true career and that she and Watts are not related. Instead, Watts tells all of this to the hotel manager, who is still in love with the girl and wants to marry her. At the wedding, Stoner fatally shoots Watts, who performs the death scene from Julius Caesar as his final performance. Stoner is captured, and the girl and her new husband live happily ever after.

== Cast ==
- DeWolf Hopper as H. Ulysses Watts
- Carl Stockdale as Stoner
- Frank Bennett as Hotel Proprietor
- Loyola O'Connor as His Mother
- Bessie Love as The Girl

== Reception ==
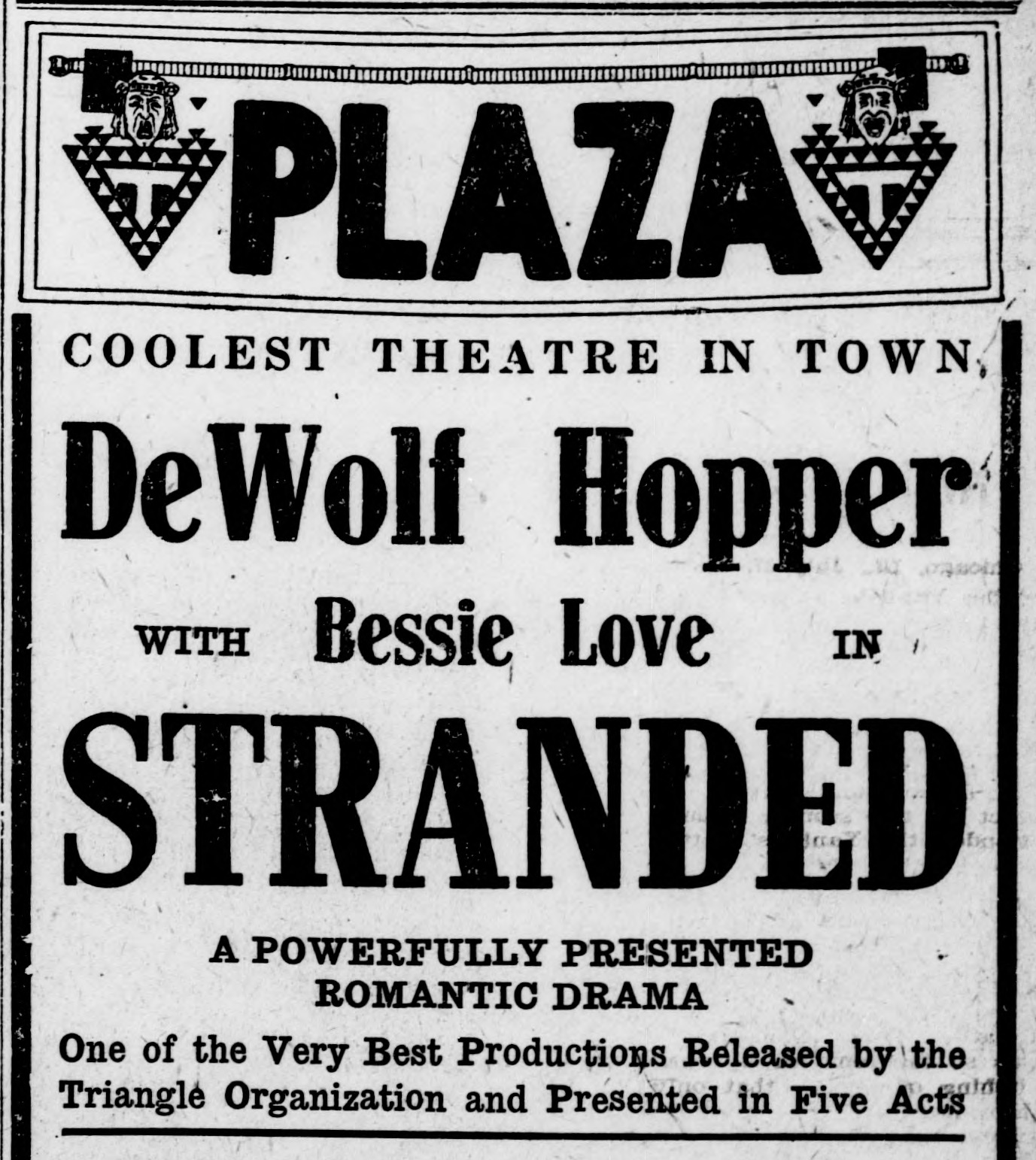
Newspaper advertisement

The film was positively received, as were the direction and performances.

== See also ==
- List of lost films
