= A Daughter of the Poor =

1917 silent film by Edward Dillon

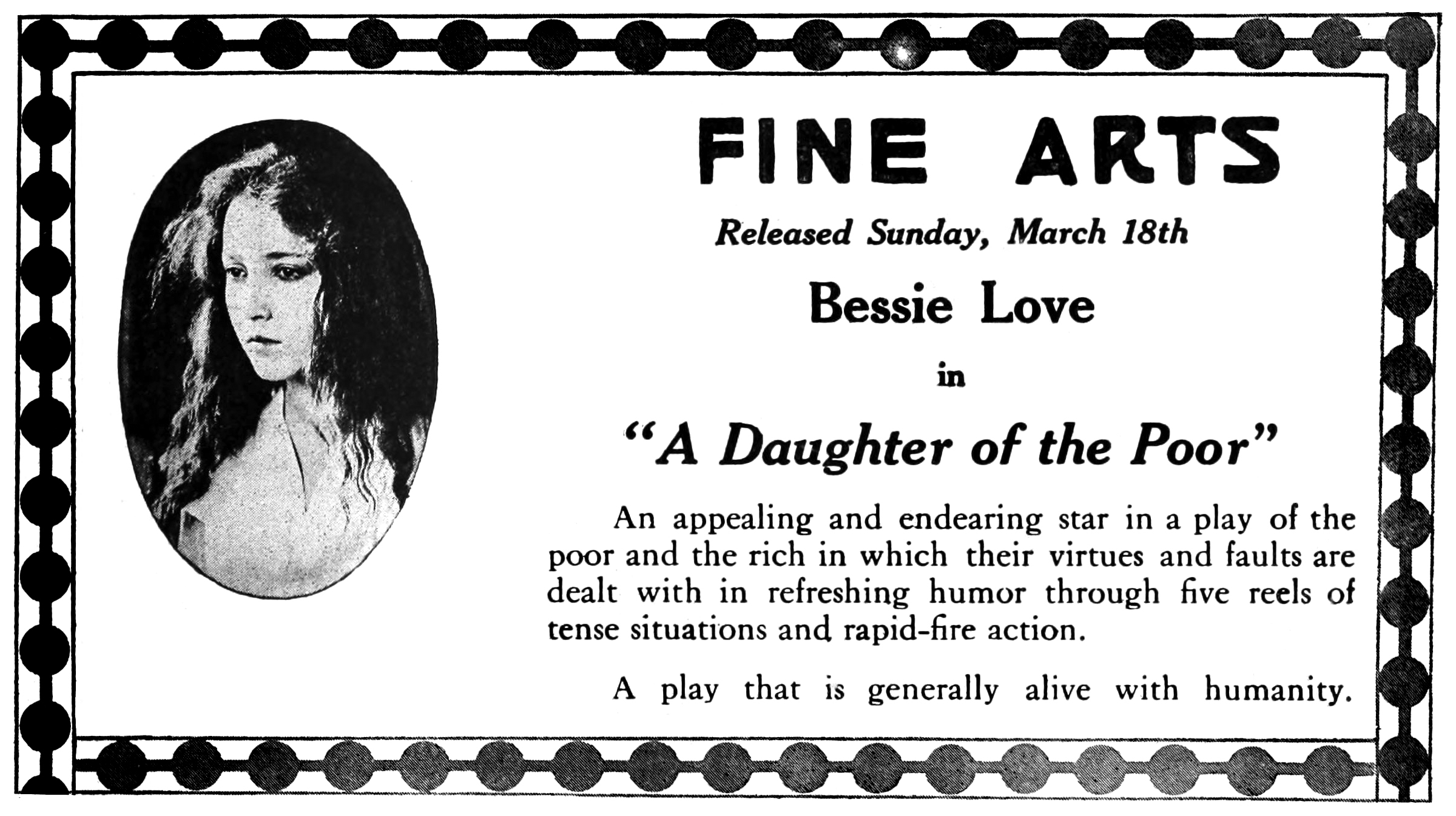
- Magazine advertisement
- Directed by: Edward Dillon
- Written by: Anita Loos
- Starring: Bessie Love
- Cinematography: Philip R. Du Bois
- Production company: Fine Arts Film Company
- Distributed by: Triangle Film Corporation
- Release date: March 18, 1917 (U.S.)
- Running time: 5 reels
- Country: United States
- Language: Silent (English intertitles)

A Daughter of the Poor is a 1917 American silent comedy-drama film produced by Fine Arts Film Company and released by Triangle Film Corporation. The film was directed by Edward Dillon and starred young Bessie Love.

Although incomplete, prints of the film survive at the George Eastman Museum.

== Plot ==
Despite her family's poverty, Rose generously helps a disabled child named Lola. Her kindness attracts wealthy publisher Jack Stevens, whose interest in Rose angers her boyfriend Creig, a worker and radical writer.

When Rose's uncle is imprisoned, she appeals to Stevens' father James for his release. Impressed by Rose, the elder Stevens learns about Lola and decides to adopt her. Creig follows Rose to the Stevens home and discovers they have published his radical treatise and want to pay him for his work.

== Cast ==
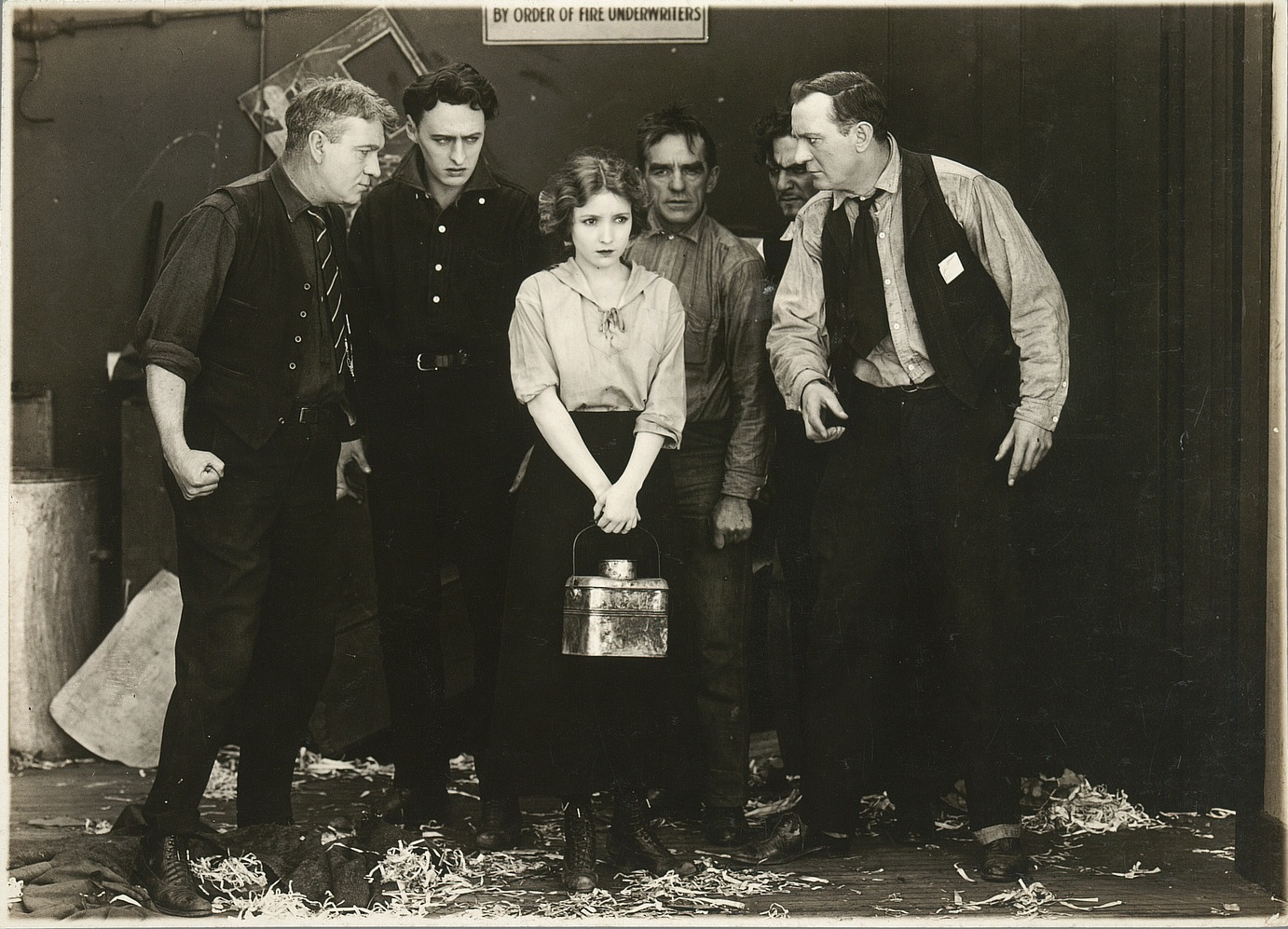
Film still

- Bessie Love as Rose Eastman
- Max Davidson as Joe Eastman
- George Beranger as Rudolph Creig
- Carl Stockdale as James Stevens
- Roy Stewart as Jack Stevens
- Mae Giraci (as Tina Rossi) as Lola
- Carmel Myers as Hazel Fleming

== Production ==
In production, the film was known as The Doll Shop and The Spitfire.

== Reception ==
Overall, the film received mixed reviews. One review deemed the production as "flawless" and declared Love's performance was "her best ... thus far." Variety noted issues with continuity. Another review said that the film was "not up to the Triangle standard."
