= Hal Wilson =

American actor

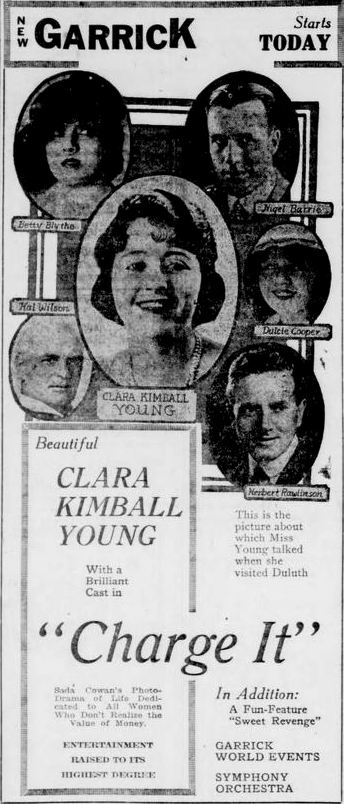
- Wilson (lower left) in 1921 advertisement for Charge It
- Born: Harold Wilson; October 2, 1861; New York City
- Died: May 22, 1933 (aged 71); Los Angeles
- Occupation: Actor
- Spouse: Ethel Harbord (m. 1896–1933)

Hal Wilson (also credited Harold Wilson; born Hippocrates Wolfarth, October 2, 1861 – May 22, 1933), was a character actor who appeared in silent films. He was born in New York City. He was a denizen of Hollywood. He had a significant role in The Man Trap.

Wilson got into acting at age 10 and was in his first feature film in 1915. There is some debate about his birth year. Per a 1921 studio guide, he acted on the stage for 20 years, including for Harrigan and Hart, Charles Frohman, Albert H. Woods, and the Murray Hill Theatre Stock Company under Henry V. Donnelly, before moving to film in 1907.

Wilson married Ethel Harbord, born Elizabeth Laura Sophia Pirani (b. 1869) in Melbourne, Australia, on May 13, 1896. He died in Los Angeles in 1933.

== Selected filmography ==
- Lady Godiva (1911), short film
- Cardinal Wolsey (1912)
- The Cross-Roads (1912), short film
- Doctor Bridget, Vitagraph short
- Faithful Until Death (1912), Vitagraph short film
- The Spider's Web (1912)
- Rob Roy (1913) as Jarvie
- The Sable Lorcha (1915)
- The Little School Ma'am (1916) as Washington
- Casey at the Bat (1916) as a doctor
- The Midnight Man (1917) as Mr. Moore
- The End of the Tour (1917)
- The Little Yank (1917)
- Betsy's Burglar (1917)
- The Man Trap (1917)
- Her Official Fathers (1917)
- Kingdom Come (1919)
- Dinty (1920)
- Whispering Devils (1920)
- Suds (1920)
- The Secret Four (1921)
- The Unknown Wife (1921)
- Charge It (1921)
- Nan of the North (1922), a film serial, as Gaspar Le Sage
- Forget Me Not (1922)
- Blaze Away (1922)
- According to Hoyle (1922)
- Main Street (1923)
- The Love Master (1924) as Alec McLeod
- Sundown (1924)
- Smilin' at Trouble (1925)
- Divorce Made Easy (1929)
