= Her Official Fathers =

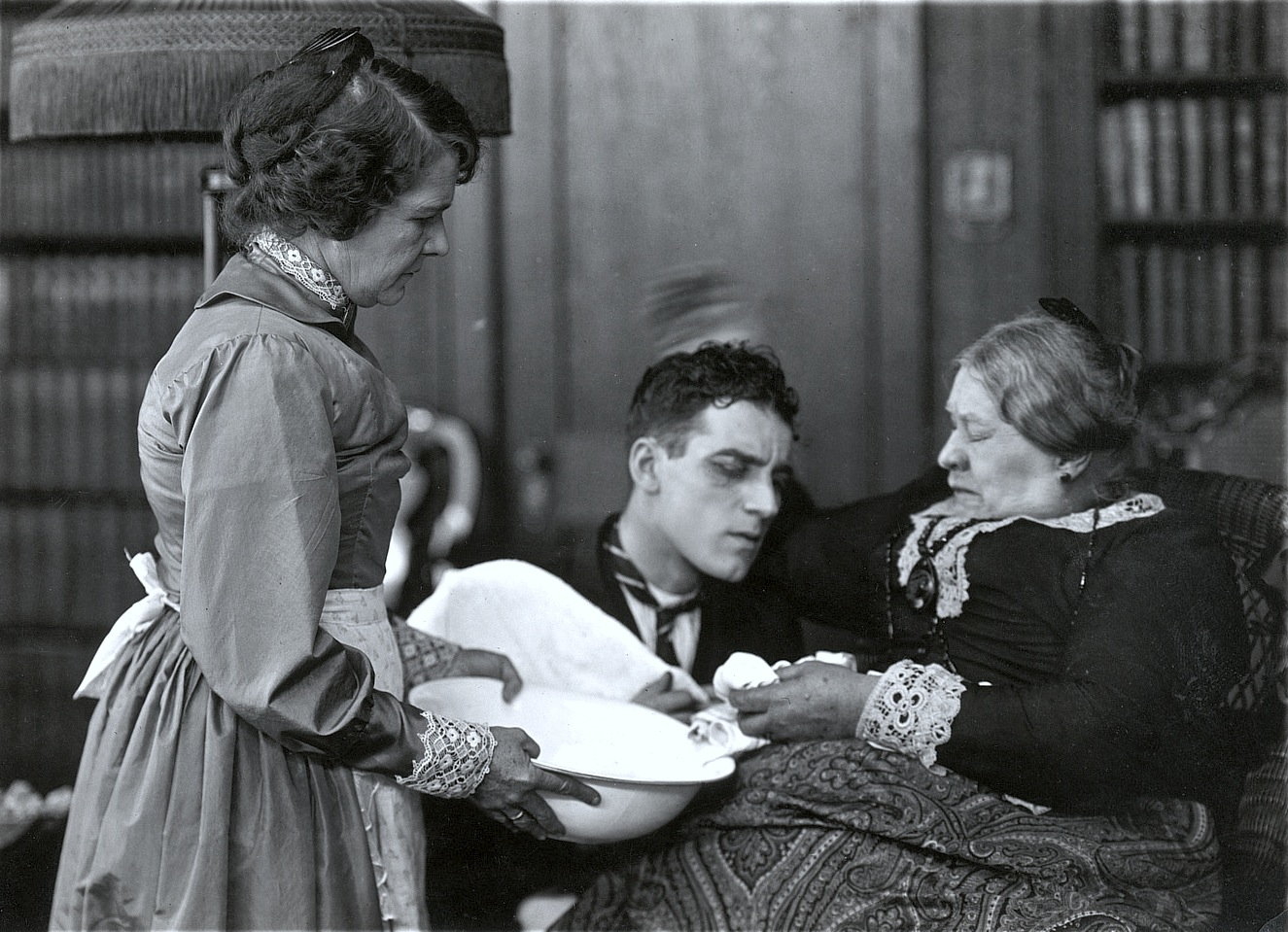
- Directed by: Elmer Clifton; Joseph Henabery
- Written by: Roy Somerville; Hugh S. Miller
- Starring: Dorothy Gish; Frank Bennett; F.A. Turner
- Cinematography: Karl Brown
- Production company: Fine Arts Film Co.
- Distributed by: Triangle Film Corp.
- Release date: April 8, 1917
- Running time: 5 reels
- Country: United States
- Languages: Silent; English intertitles

Her Official Fathers is a 1917 American silent film that was co-directed by Elmer Clifton and Joseph Henabery. It was produced as a starring vehicle for Dorothy Gish, and she may have directed some parts of the film.

Her Official Fathers was never registered for a copyright and is technically in the public domain. It is thought to be a lost film.

== Plot ==
Gish plays Janice, a wealthy girl whose fortune has been entrusted to two trust company vice presidents (the "official fathers" of the title). One of the vice presidents proposes marriage to the girl, but Janice also finds herself accepting the proposal of the other vice president's son. Confused over who she prefers, she retracts her acceptance of both proposals and becomes engaged to a bank teller. When the true motives of her three would-be suitors come to light, Janice makes the right decision about whom to marry.

== Cast ==
- Dorothy Gish - Janice
- Frank Bennett - Steven Peabody
- F.A. Turner - John Webster
- Sam De Grasse - Ethan Dexter
- Fred Warren - Henry Jarvis
- Milton Schumann - Winfield Jarvis
- Jennie Lee - Aunt Lydia
- Richard Cummings - Anthony White
- Charles Lee - William Blaine
- Hal Wilson - John
- Bessie Buskirk - Maid

== Production ==
Many of the exterior scenes were filmed on location in Los Angeles' Chinatown. Jennie Lee, as Aunt Lydia, appears in the film in a wheelchair due to an automobile accident off set.
