= Richard Leslie (actor) =

American actor

Richard Leslie was an actor in theater and then Vitagraph short comedy films from 1912 to 1916. He was listed among Vitagraph's "Prominent Personages" in 1915 newspaper advertorial. He wrote that he worked for a tea company before become interested in theater.

He wrote in 1916 in a Motion Picture Classic illustrated article that he was born 33 years prior in Liverpool, England and became make-up manager for the Vitagraph Company. He described himself as Vitagraph's official "drunk, parson, and butler. He reportedly made up 738 people for Lincoln's Speech at Gettysburg and 500 for The Little Minister. He wrote about the difference between makeup for staged performances and film. He also discussed the use of color on film sets and makeup to achieve affects. He recommended the eyes of Irish brunettes for their luminosity, which he stated could not be recreated on film with makeup.

Actress Gladys Leslie was his sister.

== Filmography ==
Acting roles
Year	Title	Role	Notes	Ref.
1912	The Valet			
1912	Doctor Bridget			
1912	It All Came Out in the Wash	Valet		
1913	The Golf Game and the Bonnet			
1913	The Sale of a Heart			
1913	Matrimonial Manoeuvres			
1913	He Fell in Love with His Mother-in-Law			
1913	Those Troublesome Tresses			
1913	When the Press Speaks	William		
1913	The Intruder	Valet		
1913	Gilbert Gray's Valet			
1913	Dr. Crathern's Experiment			
1913	The Drop of Blood			
1913	The Fortune	as Third Jokester		
1913	The House in Suburbia	Gerald Brooks		
1913	The Mouse and the Lion	Jack		
1913	Beau Brummel	Lord Beaconsfield	credited as Dick Leslie	
1913	The Skull			
1913	What a Change of Clothes Did			
1913	The Butler			
1914	The Little Minister	McKenzie - Friend of Rintoul		
1914	An Instructor			
1914	Our Fairy Play			
1914	The Village Cutup			
1914	The Adventure of the Rival Undertakers	John		
1914	The Old Fire Horse and the New Fire Chief			
1914	The Tattoo Mark	Steve Brogan		
1914	Her Great Scoop	Dick Perkins		
1914	The Misadventures of a Mighty Monarch			
1914	Bunny's Little Brother			
1915	The Conquest of Constantia	Teddy	credited as Dick Leslie Jr.	
1915	Lillian's Husbands			
1915	The Mystery of Mary			
1915	Elsa's Brother			
1915	When Greek Meets Greek			
1915	Breaking In			
1915	Mother's Roses	Perkins the Butler		
1916	Autumn			

== See also ==
- List of Vitagraph Studios films
