= Charles Stokes Wayne =

Charles Stokes Wayne (March 18, 1858-1920) , who wrote using the pseudonym Horace Hazeltine and who has also been noted as Horace Hazelton, was a writer. Several of his works were adapted to film including The Sable Lorcha.

He was born in Philadelphia, Pennsylvania and lived in Chappaqua, New York.

He attended Boys Central High School. He married Elizabeth W. Dougherty and later Sarah E. Smith and then Pearl Norris. He worked for various newspapers including in Colorado Springs and Cripple Creek, Colorado. He also wrote brochures.

== Writings ==
- Mrs. Lord's moonstone, and other stories (1888)

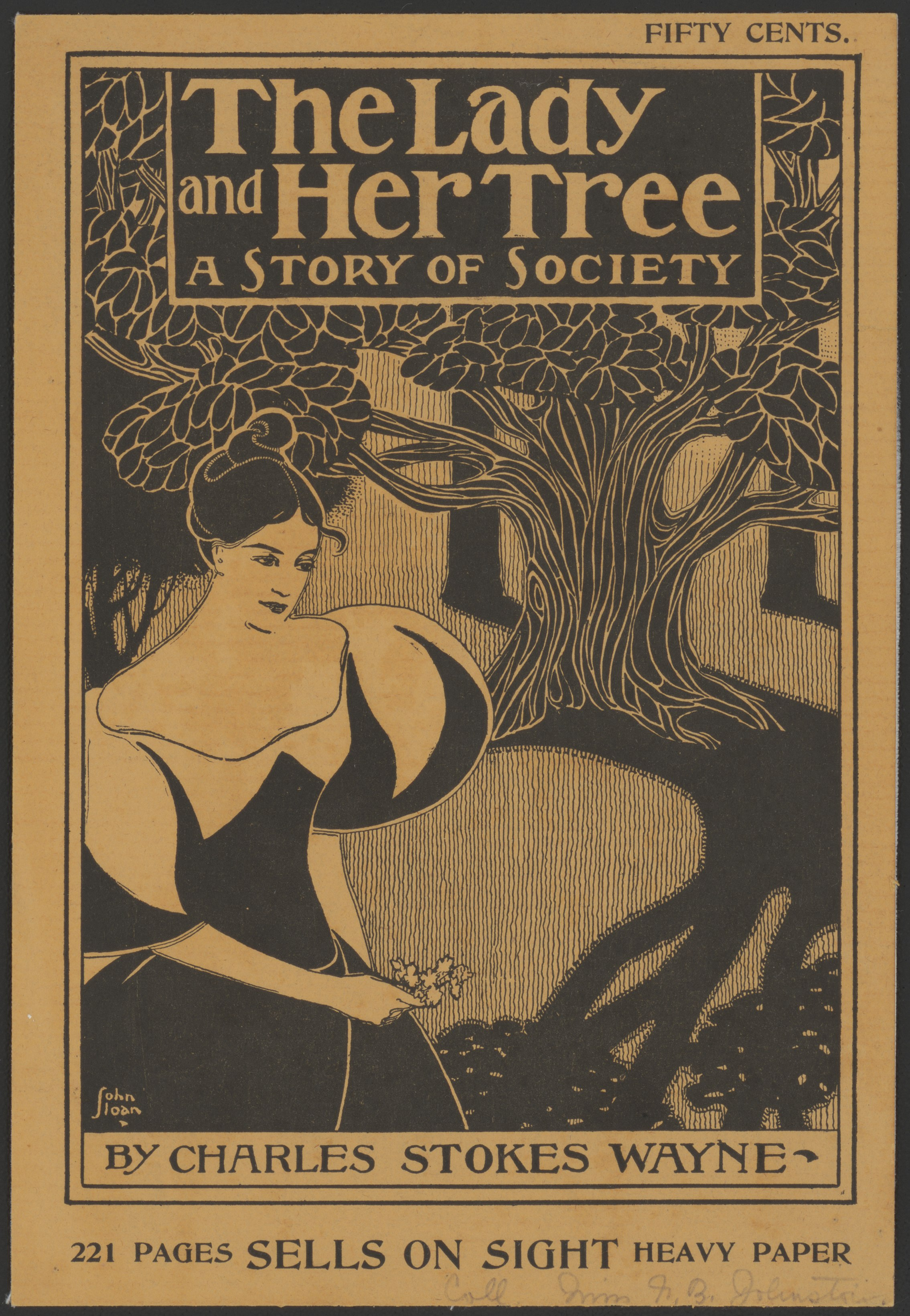
The Lady and Her Tree advertisement

- The Lady and Her Tree (1890)
- The City of Encounters (1908)
- The Confession of a Neurasthenic (1913)
- The Sable Lorcha (1912)
- The Snapdragon (1913), a children's book
- A Prince to Order
- The marriage of Mrs. Merlin
- Anthony Kent
- A Witch of To-day

=== Stories ===
- "The Man in the Watch" (1900)
- "Backward, O Time!"
- "In the Noon of the Moon"
- "The Little God's Trick"

== Filmography ==
- The Winchester Woman (1913)
- The Sable Lorcha (1915) based on his novel The Sable Lorcha
- Her Good Name (1917)
- The Iron Ring (1917)
- The Appearance of Evil (1918)
- The Midnight Bride (1920)
