= Fine Arts Film Company =

- Industry: Film
- Headquarters: Sunset Boulevard, Beverly Hills, California, United States
- Products: Silent films
- Parent: Triangle Film Corporation

Fine Arts Film Company produced dozens of movies during the silent film era in the United States. It was one of the film production studios in Triangle Film Corporation, each run by one of the parent company's vice-presidents: D. W. Griffith, Thomas H. Ince, and Mack Sennett. Fine Arts was Griffith's studio and was located on Sunset Boulevard. It was often billed as Triangle Fine Arts.

Douglas Fairbanks debuted in The Lamb (1915).

A 1916 edition of Camera Craft noted Griffiths leadership of the studio and its filmmaking in the wake of his success with The Birth of a Nation. It also featured photos of the studio's still photographers and one of its stages.

Christy Cabanne was a director with the studio until he left for Metro Pictures Corporation.

Actors with the studio included William A. Lowry.

== Partial filmography ==
- The Lamb (1915)
- Martyrs of the Alamo (1915)
- The Americano (1916)
- An Innocent Magdalene (1916)
- The Good Bad-Man (1916)
- Hoodoo Ann (1916)
- Diane of the Follies (1916)
- American Aristocracy (1916)
- The Half-Breed (1916)
- The House Built Upon Sand (1916)
- Acquitted (1916)
- The Flying Torpedo (1916)
- Reggie Mixes In (1916)
- Stranded (1916)
- Hell-to-Pay Austin (1916)
- A Sister of Six (1916)
- The Heiress at Coffee Dan's (1916)
- Nina, the Flower Girl (1917)
- A Daughter of the Poor (1917)
- Cheerful Givers (1917)
- A Woman's Awakening (1917)
- Shinbone Alley (1917)
- Big Yellow Taxi (1917)
- Stagestruck (1917)
- Madame Bo-peep (1917)
- Hands Up! (1917)
