= Lillian Gish filmography =

Filmography

These are the films of Lillian Gish.

== Silent short films ==
Year	Title	Role	Director	Studio	Notes					
Year	Title	Role	Director	Studio	Notes	1912	An Unseen Enemy	The Sister	D. W. Griffith	Biograph Company
Two Daughters of Eve	In Theatre Crowd	D. W. Griffith	Biograph Company			1912				
So Near, yet So Far	A Friend	D. W. Griffith	Biograph Company			1912				
In the Aisles of the Wild	The Young Daughter	D. W. Griffith	Biograph Company	Lost		1912				
The One She Loved		D. W. Griffith	Biograph Company			1912				
The Painted Lady	Belle at Ice Cream Festival	D. W. Griffith	Biograph Company	Uncredited		1912				
The Musketeers of Pig Alley	The Little Lady	D. W. Griffith	Biograph Company			1912				
Gold and Glitter	The Young Woman	D. W. Griffith	Biograph Company			1912				
My Baby		D. W. Griffith	Biograph Company			1912				
The Informer	Undetermined Secondary Role	D. W. Griffith	Biograph Company			1912				
Brutality	At Theatre	D. W. Griffith	Biograph Company			1912				
The New York Hat	Customer in Shop / Outside Church	D. W. Griffith	Biograph Company			1912				
The Burglar's Dilemma	Birthday Wellwisher	D. W. Griffith	Biograph Company			1912				
A Cry for Help	The Maid	D. W. Griffith	Biograph Company	Lost		1912				
1913	Oil and Water	In First Audience	D. W. Griffith	Biograph Company	Uncredited					
1913	The Unwelcome Guest	At Auction	D. W. Griffith	Biograph Company	Uncredited					
1913	A Misunderstood Boy	The Daughter	D. W. Griffith	Biograph Company						
1913	The Left-Handed Man	The Old Soldier's Daughter	D. W. Griffith	Biograph Company						
1913	The Lady and the Mouse	The First Sister Woman	D. W. Griffith	Biograph Company						
1913	The House of Darkness	The Nurse	D. W. Griffith	Biograph Company						
1913	Just Gold	The Sweetheart	D. W. Griffith	Biograph Company						
1913	A Timely Interception	The Farmer's Daughter	D. W. Griffith	Biograph Company						
1913	The Mothering Heart	The Young Wife	D. W. Griffith	Biograph Company						
1913	An Indian's Loyalty	The Ranchero's Daughter	Christy Cabanne	Biograph Company	Lost					
1913	During the Round-Up	The Ranchero's Daughter	Christy Cabanne	Biograph Company	Lost					
1913	A Woman in the Ultimate	Verda	Dell Henderson	Biograph Company	Lost					
1913	A Modest Hero	The Wife	Dell Henderson	Biograph Company	Lost					
1913	So Runs the Way	Fred's Wife	Christy Cabanne	Biograph Company	Lost					
1913	Madonna of the Storm	The Mother	D. W. Griffith	Biograph Company	Lost					
1913	The Battle at Elderbush Gulch	Melissa Harlow	D. W. Griffith	Biograph Company						
1913	The Conscience of Hassan Bey	The Rugmaker's Daughter	D. W. Griffith and Christy Cabanne	Biograph Company						
1913	The Little Tease	Girl in bandanna	D. W. Griffith	Biograph Company	Lost					
1914	The Green-Eyed Devil	Mary Miller	James Kirkwood Sr.	Reliance Film Company	Lost					
1914	The Hunchback	The Orphan - as an Adult	Christy Cabanne	Majestic Film Company	Lost					
1914	The Quicksands		Christy Cabanne	Majestic Film Company	Lost					
1914	The Rebellion of Kitty Belle	Kitty Belle	Christy Cabanne	Majestic Film Company	Lost					
1914	The Angel of Contention	Nettie - the Angel	John B. O'Brien	Majestic Film Company	Lost					
1914	Man's Enemy	Grace Lisle	Frank Powell	Biograph Company						
1914	The Tear That Burned	Anita - the Truant	John B. O'Brien	Majestic Film Company	Lost					
1914	The Folly of Anne	Anne	John B. O'Brien	Majestic Film Company	Lost					
1914	The Sisters	May	Christy Cabanne	Majestic Film Company	Lost					
1915	The Lost House	Dosia Dale	Christy Cabanne	Majestic Film Company	Lost					
1916	Pathways of Life		Christy Cabanne	Triangle Film Corporation						
1918	Lillian Gish in a Liberty Loan Appeal		D. W. Griffith	Artcraft	Lost					

== Silent feature films ==
Year	Title	Role	Director	Studio	Notes					
Year	Title	Role	Director	Studio	Notes	1914	Judith of Bethulia	The Young Mother	D. W. Griffith	Biograph Company
The Battle of the Sexes	Jane Andrews	D. W. Griffith	Majestic Film Company	Incomplete		1914				
Home, Sweet Home	Payne's Sweetheart	D. W. Griffith	Reliance			1914				
Lord Chumley	Eleanor Butterworth	James Kirkwood	Biograph Company			1914				
1915	The Birth of a Nation	Elsie Stoneman	D. W. Griffith	D. W. Griffith Corporation						
1915	Enoch Arden	Annie Lee	Christy Cabanne	Majestic Film Company						
1915	Captain Macklin	Beatrice	John B. O'Brien	Majestic Film Company	Lost					
1915	The Lily and the Rose	Mary Randolph	Paul Powell	Triangle Film Corporation						
1916	Daphne and the Pirate	Daphne La Tour	Christy Cabanne	Triangle Film Corporation	Lost					
1916	Sold for Marriage	Marfa	Christy Cabanne	Triangle Film Corporation						
1916	An Innocent Magdalene	Dorothy Raleigh	Allan Dwan	Triangle Film Corporation	Lost					
1916	Intolerance	The Woman Who Rocks the Cradle / Eternal Mother	D. W. Griffith	Triangle Film Corporation						
1916	Diane of the Follies	Diane	Christy Cabanne	Triangle Film Corporation	Lost					
1916	The Children Pay	Millicent	Lloyd Ingraham	Triangle Film Corporation						
1916	The House Built Upon Sand	Evelyn Dare	Edward Morrissey	Triangle Film Corporation	Lost					
1917	Souls Triumphant	Lillian Vale	John B. O'Brien	Triangle Film Corporation	Lost					
1918	Hearts of the World	Marie Stephenson	D. W. Griffith	Famous Players-Lasky						
1918	The Great Love	Susie Broadplains	D. W. Griffith	Famous Players-Lasky	Lost					
1918	The Greatest Thing in Life	Jeannette Peret	D. W. Griffith	Famous Players-Lasky	Lost					
1919	A Romance of Happy Valley	Jennie Timberlake	D. W. Griffith	Famous Players-Lasky						
1919	Broken Blossoms	Lucy Burrows	D. W. Griffith	United Artists						
1919	True Heart Susie	True Heart Susie	D. W. Griffith	Artcraft						
1919	The Greatest Question	Nellie Jarvis	D. W. Griffith	First National Pictures						
1920	Remodeling Her Husband	—N/a	Lillian Gish	Famous Players-Lasky	Director only Lost					
1920	Way Down East	Anna Moore	D. W. Griffith	United Artists						
1921	Orphans of the Storm	Henriette Girard	D. W. Griffith	United Artists						
1923	The White Sister	Angela Chiaromonte	Henry King	Metro Pictures						
1924	Romola	Romola	Henry King	Metro-Goldwyn-Mayer						
1925	Ben-Hur: A Tale of the Christ	Chariot Race Spectator	Fred Niblo	Metro-Goldwyn-Mayer	Cameo (Uncredited)					
1926	La Bohème	Mimi	King Vidor	Metro-Goldwyn-Mayer						
1926	The Scarlet Letter	Hester Prynne	Victor Sjöström	Metro-Goldwyn-Mayer						
1927	Annie Laurie	Annie Laurie	John S. Robertson	Metro-Goldwyn-Mayer						
1927	The Enemy	Pauli Arndt	Fred Niblo	Metro-Goldwyn-Mayer	Final reel is lost					
1928	The Wind	Letty	Victor Sjöström	Metro-Goldwyn-Mayer						

== Sound films ==
Year	Title	Role	Director	Studio	Notes					
Year	Title	Role	Director	Studio	Notes	1930	One Romantic Night	Princess Alexandra	Paul L. Stein	United Artists
1933	His Double Life	Alice Chalice	Arthur Hopkins	Paramount Pictures						
1942	Commandos Strike at Dawn	Mrs. Bergesen	John Farrow	Columbia Pictures						
1943	Top Man	Beth Warren	Charles Lamont	Universal Pictures	Alternate title: Man of the Family					
1946	Miss Susie Slagle's	Miss Susie Slagle	John Berry	Paramount Pictures						
1946	Duel in the Sun	Laura Belle	King Vidor	Vanguard Films	Nominated - Academy Award for Best Supporting Actress					
1948	Portrait of Jennie	Mother Mary of Mercy	William Dieterle	Vanguard Films						
1955	The Cobweb	Victoria Inch	Vincente Minnelli	Metro-Goldwyn-Mayer						
1955	The Night of the Hunter	Rachel Cooper	Charles Laughton	United Artists						
1958	Orders to Kill	Mrs. Summers	Anthony Asquith	British Lion Films						
1960	The Unforgiven	Mattilda Zachary	John Huston	United Artists						
1966	Follow Me, Boys!	Hetty Seibert	Norman Tokar	Walt Disney Pictures						
1967	Warning Shot	Alice Willows	Buzz Kulik	Paramount Pictures						
1967	The Comedians	Mrs. Smith	Peter Glenville	Metro-Goldwyn-Mayer						
1978	A Wedding	Nettie Sloan	Robert Altman	Lion's Gate Films, Inc.						
1983	Hambone and Hillie	Hillie Radcliffe	Roy Watts	Adams Apple Film Company						
1986	Sweet Liberty	Cecelia Burgess	Alan Alda	Universal Pictures						
1987	The Whales of August	Sarah Webber	Lindsay Anderson	Nelson Entertainment						

== Television ==
Year	Title	Role	Notes				
Year	Title	Role	Notes	1949	The Ford Theatre Hour	Mrs. Midget	Episode: "Outward Bound"
The Philco Television Playhouse	Abby	Episode: "The Late Christopher Bean"		1949			
1951	Celanese Theatre	Sister Christina	Episode: "The Joyous Season"				
1951	Robert Montgomery Presents		Episode: "Ladies in Retirement"				
1952	Schlitz Playhouse of Stars	Grandma Moses	Episode: "The Autobiography of Grandma Moses"				
1953	The Philco Television Playhouse	Carrie Watts	Episode: "The Trip to Bountiful"				
1954	Robert Montgomery Presents		Episode: "The Quality of Mercy"				
1954	The Campbell Playhouse	Miss Harrington	Episode: "The Corner Druggist"				
1955	Kraft Television Theatre	Mrs. Bibb	Episode: "I, Mrs. Bibb"				
1955	Playwrights '56	Mrs. Compson	Episode: "The Sound and the Fury"				
1956	Ford Star Jubilee	Mary Todd Lincoln	Episode: "The Day Lincoln Was Shot"				
1956	The Alcoa Hour	Esther Crampton	Episode: "Mornings at Seven"				
1960	The Play of the Week	Dolly Talbo	Episode: "The Glass Harp"				
1962	The Defenders	Laura Clarendon	Episode: "Grandma TNT"				
1963	Mr. Novak	Miss Maude Phipps	Episode: "Hello, Miss Phipps"				
1963	Breaking Point	Stella Manville	Episode: The Gnu, Now Almost Extinct"				
1964	The Defenders	Mrs. Cooper	Episode: "Stowaway"				
1964	The Alfred Hitchcock Hour	Bessie Carnby	Episode: "Body in the Barn"				
1969	Arsenic And Old Lace	Martha Brewster	TV movie				
1976	Twin Detectives	Billy Jo Haskins	TV movie				
1978	Sparrow	Widow	TV movie				
1981	The Love Boat	Mrs. Williams	Episode: "Isaac's Teacher"				
1981	Thin Ice	Grandmother	TV movie				
1983	Hobson's Choice	Miss Molly Winkle	TV movie				
1985	American Playhouse	Mrs. Loftus	Episode: "Adventures of Huckleberry Finn"				
