= Violet Wilkey =

American actress

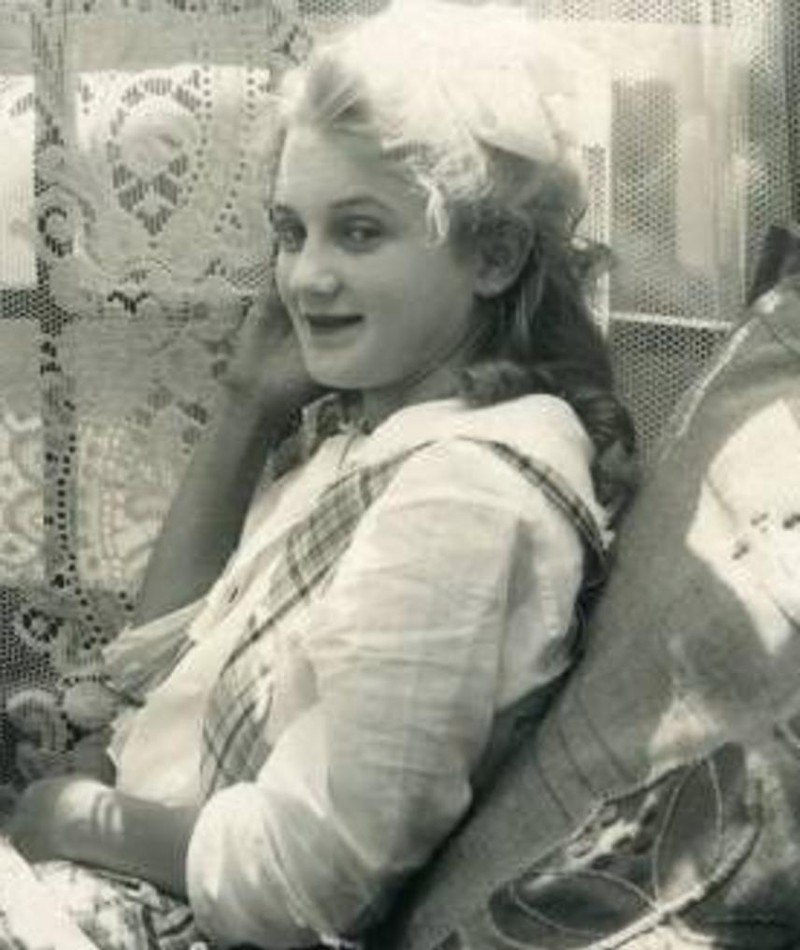
- Wilkey in 1917
- Born: Violet Louise Wilkey; January 10, 1903; St. Louis, Missouri, U.S.
- Died: June 5, 1976 (aged 73); North Hollywood, California, U.S.
- Occupation: Actress
- Years active: 1913–1917
- Spouse: Russell Gilbert Kauffmann (1927–?)

Violet Louise Wilkey (January 10, 1903 – June 5, 1976) was an American child actress who appeared in 18 films over a four-year period during the silent film era.

== Career ==
Violet Wilkey was born in St. Louis, Missouri to an English father named Arthur Wilkey and an American mother named Anna Dora Wilkey (née Winter). Violet made her motion picture debut at the age of 10 in a 1913 dramatic short entitled The Little Mother opposite actress Ruth Stonehouse. Her follow-up film would be the 1914 release The Old Maid opposite Blanche Sweet, Spottiswoode Aitken, Mary Alden and Jack Conway.

She is possibly best remembered for her appearance as a young Flora in D. W. Griffith's controversial 1915 classic The Birth of a Nation. Wilkey portrayed the character Flora Cameron as a child in flashback scenes; the character of Flora as an adult in the film was portrayed by actress Mae Marsh.

Wilkey spent the next few years in relatively minor roles; including one of actor/director Tod Browning's early efforts The Burned Hand from 1915. Other notable films of the period were the Lloyd Ingraham directed and Anita Loos penned drama The Children Pay (1916), opposite Lillian Gish and Alma Rubens and the 1917 drama Cheerful Givers opposite Bessie Love, Aitken, Kenneth Harlan and Pauline Starke.

Wilkey's final film performance was in the role of Minnie Smellie in the 1917 comedy-drama Rebecca of Sunnybrook Farm, which was directed by Marshall Neilan and starred Mary Pickford in the title role. She retired from acting shortly thereafter at the age of 14.

== Personal life ==
Wilkey married Russell Gilbert Kauffmann on January 27, 1927 and the couple had two children, Robert Russell and Patricia. The marriage ended in divorce.

== Filmography ==
Year	Title	Role	Notes
1913	The Little Mother		Short
1914	The Old Maid	Dorothy as a Child	Short
1915	The Birth of a Nation	Flora Cameron as a Child	Uncredited
1915	The Little Mother	Mamie Delmar	Short
1915	Mike's Elopement	Bridget	Short
1915	Hearts United	Elsie Windom	Short
1915	The Burned Hand		Short
1915	A Bad Man and Others	Dorothy Hewitt - the Child	Short
1915	The Healers	Violet	Short
1915	Her Fairy Prince	Violet Nash	Short
1915	The Little Orphans	Doris	Short
1915	The Wayward Son	Katie Didyer	Short
1916	Little Miss Nobody		
1916	The Children Pay	Jean - Millicent's sister	
1917	Cheerful Givers	Oldest Orphan Girl	
1917	Rebecca of Sunnybrook Farm	Minnie Smellie	(final film role)
