= Edward Morrissey =

Edward Morrissey may refer to:

- Edward Morrissey (director), film director in the United States
- Edward Morrissey, former senior minister with the Living Enrichment Center
- Ed Morrissey, columnist for The Week
