= Man's Country =

Man's Country may refer to:

- A Man's Country, a 1919 silent Western directed by Henry Kolker
- Man's Country (film), a 1938 American Western directed by Robert F. Hill
- Man's Country (bathhouse), chain of gay bathhouses in Chicago and New York City
