= Tess of the d'Urbervilles (disambiguation) =

Tess of the d'Urbervilles is an 1891 novel by Thomas Hardy.

Tess of the d'Urbervilles may also refer to:

- Tess of the d'Urbervilles (1913 film), 1913 American silent drama film
- Tess of the d'Urbervilles (1924 film), 1924 American silent drama film
- Tess, 1979 film directed by Roman Polanski
- Tess of the D'Urbervilles (1998 TV serial), 1998 British television serial
- Tess of the D'Urbervilles (2008 TV serial), 2008 British television serial
