= An Innocent Magdalene =

1916 film

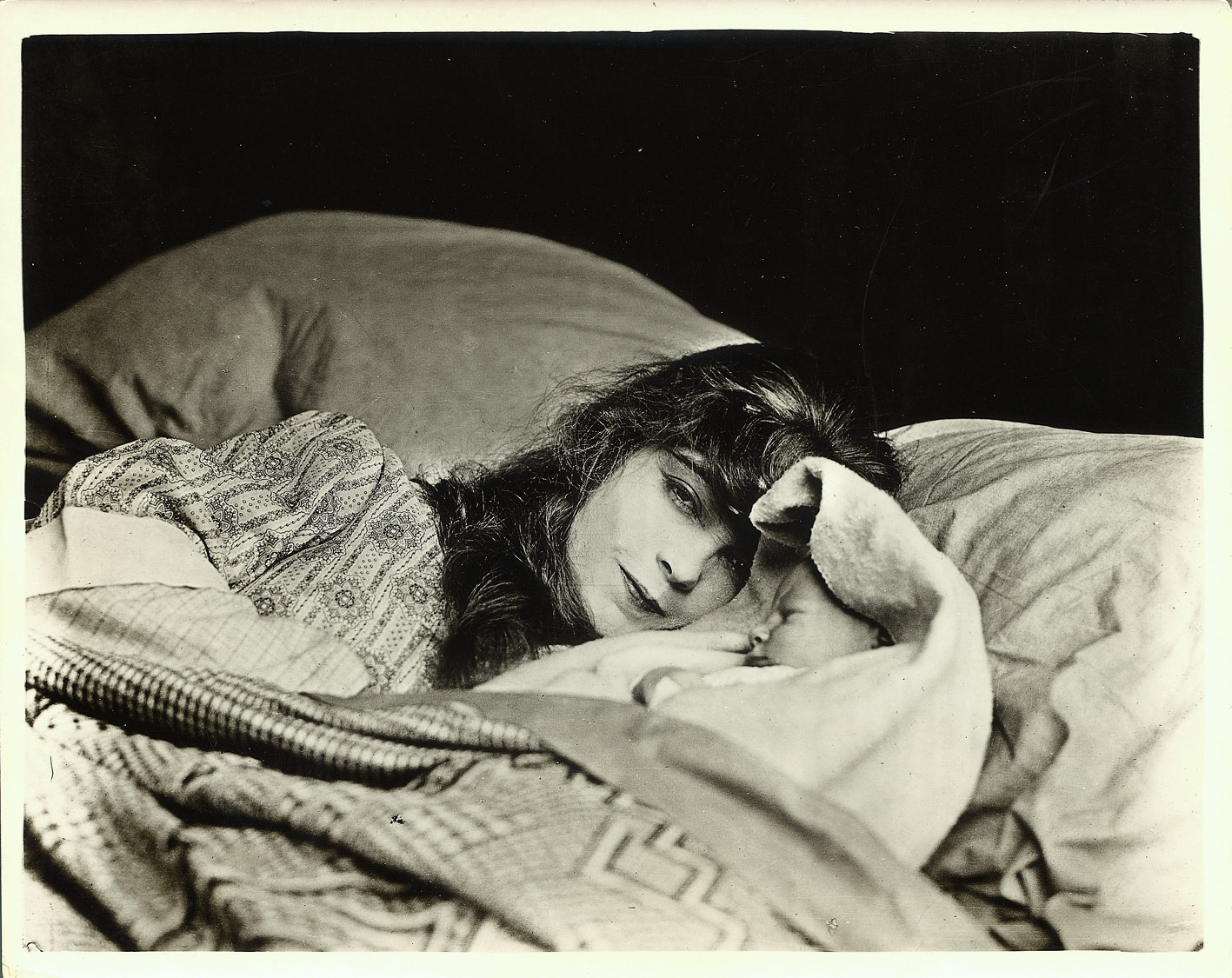
- Directed by: Allan Dwan
- Written by: D. W. Griffith (as Granville Warwick); Roy Somerville
- Starring: Lillian Gish
- Cinematography: Victor Fleming
- Distributed by: Triangle Film Corporation
- Release date: June 18, 1916
- Running time: 50 minutes; 5 reels
- Country: United States
- Language: Silent with English intertitles

An Innocent Magdalene is a 1916 American silent drama film directed by Allan Dwan. It is considered to be a lost film and was added to the National Film Preservation Board's list of lost American silent feature films in February 2021.

== Plot ==
Dorothy Raleigh falls in love with Northern gambler Forbes Stewart, but her Southern father, Colonel Raleigh, refuses to give his consent to their marriage. They elope, and soon Dorothy becomes pregnant. Forbes vows to reform, but is sent to prison for a year. Forbes' ex-girlfriend lies to Dorothy, telling her that Forbes is her husband. Believing her child is illegitimate and disowned by her father, she is about to commit suicide when Forbes returns just in time.

== Cast ==
- Lillian Gish as Dorothy Raleigh
- Spottiswoode Aitken as Colonel Raleigh
- Sam De Grasse as Forbes Stewart
- Mary Alden as The Woman
- Seymour Hastings as The Preacher
- Jennie Lee as Mammy
- William De Vaull as Old Joe

== See also ==
- Lillian Gish filmography
