= The Folly of Anne =

1914 film

- Directed by: John B. O'Brien
- Written by: Ellen Farley; George Pattullo
- Starring: Elmer Clifton; Lillian Gish
- Distributed by: Mutual Film
- Release date: November 14, 1914
- Running time: 10 minutes
- Country: United States
- Language: Silent with English intertitles

The Folly of Anne is a 1914 American short drama film directed by John B. O'Brien.

== Cast ==
- Elmer Clifton
- Donald Crisp
- Lillian Gish
- W. E. Lawrence (as William E. Lawrence)

== See also ==
- List of American films of 1914
- Lillian Gish filmography
