= Edna Mae Wilson =

American silent film actress

- Born: 1880
- Died: July 23, 1960 (aged 79–80); New York
- Occupation: Actor
- Years active: 1913 - 1920

Edna Mae Wilson (1880–1960) was an American silent film actress. Signed by the Thanhouser Company based in New Rochelle, New York in 1913, she starred in about 15 films between 1913 and 1920, sometimes in only one short film a year and often credited alongside William Garwood. She died in New York on July 23, 1960.

== Filmography ==
- Once a Plumber (1920) .... Kate Beard
- A Man's Country (1919) .... Ruth Kemp
- Maggie Pepper (1919) .... Claire Darkin
- Who Knows? (1917) (as Edna May Wilson) .... Dusk Weaver
- The Fall of a Nation (1916)
- The Education of Mr. Pipp (1914) (as Edna Brun) .... Julia Pipp
- A Diamond in the Rough (1914/I)
- The Hunchback (1914)
- Just a Song at Twilight (1914)
- A Turn of the Cards (1914)
- The Village Blacksmith
