= A Turn of the Cards =

- Starring: William Garwood; Howard Davies; William E. Lowery
- Distributed by: Mutual Film Corporation
- Release date: February 8, 1914
- Country: United States
- Languages: Silent film English intertitles

A Turn of the Cards is a 1914 American silent short drama film starring William Garwood, Howard Davies, and William E. Lowery.

== Cast ==
- J.W. Cornwall
- Howard Davies
- William Garwood
- Daniel Gilfether
- Lee Hill
- William E. Lowery
- William Nigh
- Jessalyn Van Trump
- Florence Vincent
- Edna Mae Wilson
