= Pomeroy Cannon =

American actor

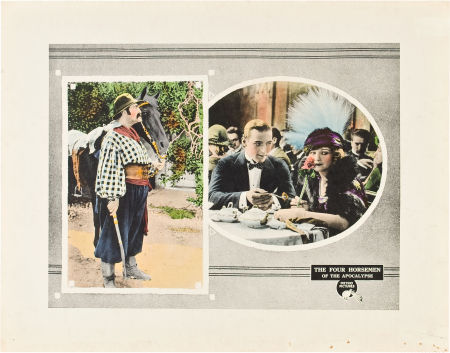
- Pomeroy Cannon (left) in The Four Horsemen of the Apocalypse (1921)
- Born: Harry Roy Cannon; March 1, 1870; New Albany, Indiana, US
- Died: September 16, 1928 (aged 58); Los Angeles, California, US
- Occupation: Actor

Pomeroy "Doc" Cannon (born Harry Roy Cannon) was an American actor who worked in Hollywood during the silent era. He was known for playing villains and tough guys.

== Biography ==
Pomeroy was born in New Albany, Indiana, to Greenbury Cannon Pomeroy and Mary Austin Pomeroy. He worked as a doctor before becoming an actor in Los Angeles and was thus nicknamed Doc.

== Partial filmography ==
- The Good Bad-Man (1916)
- The Parson of Panamint (1916)
- The Microscope Mystery (1916)
- Pidgin Island (1916)
- The Honor System (1917)
- The Circus of Life (1917)
- The Legion of Death (1918)
- Restitution (1918)
- Denny from Ireland (1918)
- A Man of Honor (1919)
- The Thunderbolt (1919)
- The Slim Princess (1920)
- The Star Rover (1920)
- The Four Horsemen of the Apocalypse (1921)
- The White Mouse (1921)
- The Rosary (1922)
- Golden Dreams (1922)
- Trifling Women (1922)
