= The Girl in the Shack =

- Directed by: Edward Morrissey
- Written by: Anita Loos
- Starring: Earle Foxe, Spottiswoode Aitken, Mae Marsh
- Release date: 1914
- Country: United States
- Language: Silent

The Girl in the Shack is a 1914 American silent short film directed by Edward Morrissey and written by Anita Loos. The film starred Earle Foxe, Spottiswoode Aitken, and Mae Marsh.

Motion Picture News noted, "The drama, though old in plot, is cleverly produced and pleasant. A wild frontier girl is the means of reforming a bandit, whom she later accepts as her husband."The Moving Picture World wrote, " Western love story with girl and badman, who reforms for love of her."
