= Courtenay Foote =

English actor (1878–1925)

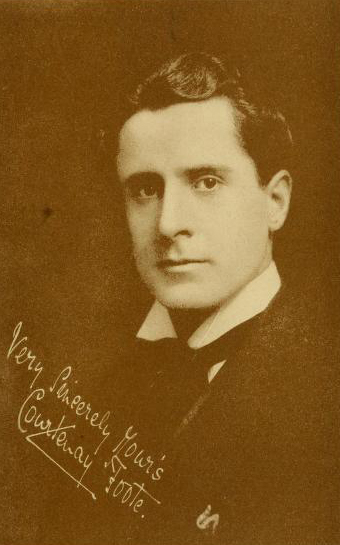
- Born: 22 November 1878; Harrogate, West Riding of Yorkshire, England
- Died: 4 May 1925 (aged 46); Italy
- Occupation: Actor
- Years active: 1914–1924

Courtenay Foote (22 November 1878 – 4 May 1925) was an English stage and silent film actor.

Born in Yorkshire, England, Foote attended Oxford, studied engineering in Germany, and worked as a civil engineer in Scotland. Friends who heard him recite blank verse encouraged him to become an actor, but his grandfather opposed that idea. Foote abandoned the plan for a while and became a broker, but his lack of success in that field led his grandfather to drop his opposition to acting. Foote told columnist Marjorie Daw in 1919 that he was descended from the 18th Century actor-playwright Samuel Foote.

An introduction to F. R. Benson, followed by Foote's recitations as an audition, resulted in Foote's first acting job. He performed with Benson's troupe for 18 months, progressing from smaller parts to more significant roles. He went on to London, performing at the Haymarket Theatre, the Court Theatre, and the Shakesperean Festival.

Foote's first play in the United States was The Debtors, in which he debuted as Arthur Clenham in New York, followed by a touring production.

A developing interest in motion pictures led Foote to visit Vitagraph Studios several times, each visit increasing his interest, His film debut was in the initial Captain Barnacle production. He went on to work for Reliance and Majestic studios.

He appeared with George Arliss on stage in 1911 in the long running play Disraeli. He appeared in 59 films between 1910 and 1924. He was born in Harrogate, West Riding of Yorkshire and died in Italy.

== Partial filmography ==
- So Near, Yet so Far (1912)
- The Quicksands (1914)
- Home, Sweet Home (1914)
- The Pursuit of the Phantom (1914)
- Buckshot John (1915)
- Captain Courtesy (1915)
- Hypocrites (1915)
- Up from the Depths (1915)
- His Parisian Wife (1919)
- The Two Brides (1919)
- The Bronze Bell (1921)
- The Passion Flower (1921)
- Fascination (1922)
- Ashes of Vengeance (1923)
- Little Old New York (1923)
- Tess of the d'Urbervilles (1924)
