= The Thunderbolt (1919 film) =

1919 film directed by Colin Campbell

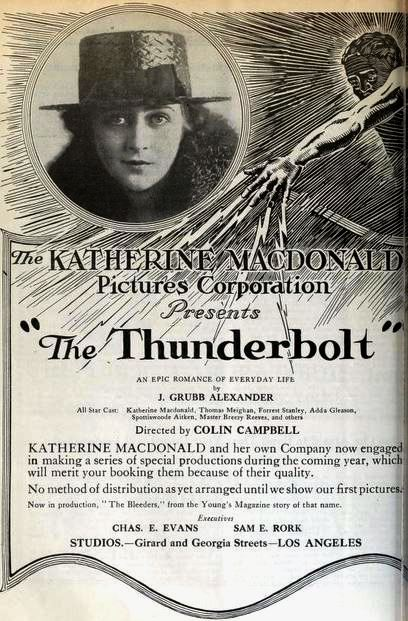
- Directed by: Colin Campbell
- Written by: J. Grubb Alexander
- Starring: Katherine MacDonald; Spottiswoode Aitken; Thomas Meighan
- Cinematography: Alfred Gandolfi
- Production company: Katherine MacDonald Pictures
- Distributed by: First National Pictures
- Release date: October 6, 1919
- Running time: 6 reels
- Country: United States
- Languages: Silent; English intertitles

The Thunderbolt is a lost 1919 American silent drama film directed by Colin Campbell and starring Katherine MacDonald, Spottiswoode Aitken and Thomas Meighan.

== Cast ==
- Katherine MacDonald as Ruth Pomeroy
- Spottiswoode Aitken as Allan Pomeroy
- Thomas Meighan as Bruce Corbin
- Forrest Stanley as Spencer Vail
- Adda Gleason as Bruce Corbin's Mother
- Pomeroy Cannon as Tom Pomeroy's Son
- Mrs. L.C. Harris as Mammy Cleo
- Jim Blackwell as The Butler
- Robert Laidlaw as The Lawyer

unbilled

- B. Reeves Eason Jr. - son of Ruth and Bruce
- James Gordon -
- Antrim Short -

== Preservation status ==
With no holdings located in archives, The Thunderbolt is considered a lost film.

== Bibliography ==
- Donald W. McCaffrey & Christopher P. Jacobs. Guide to the Silent Years of American Cinema. Greenwood Publishing, 1999.
