= The Courting of Mary =

1911 American short film

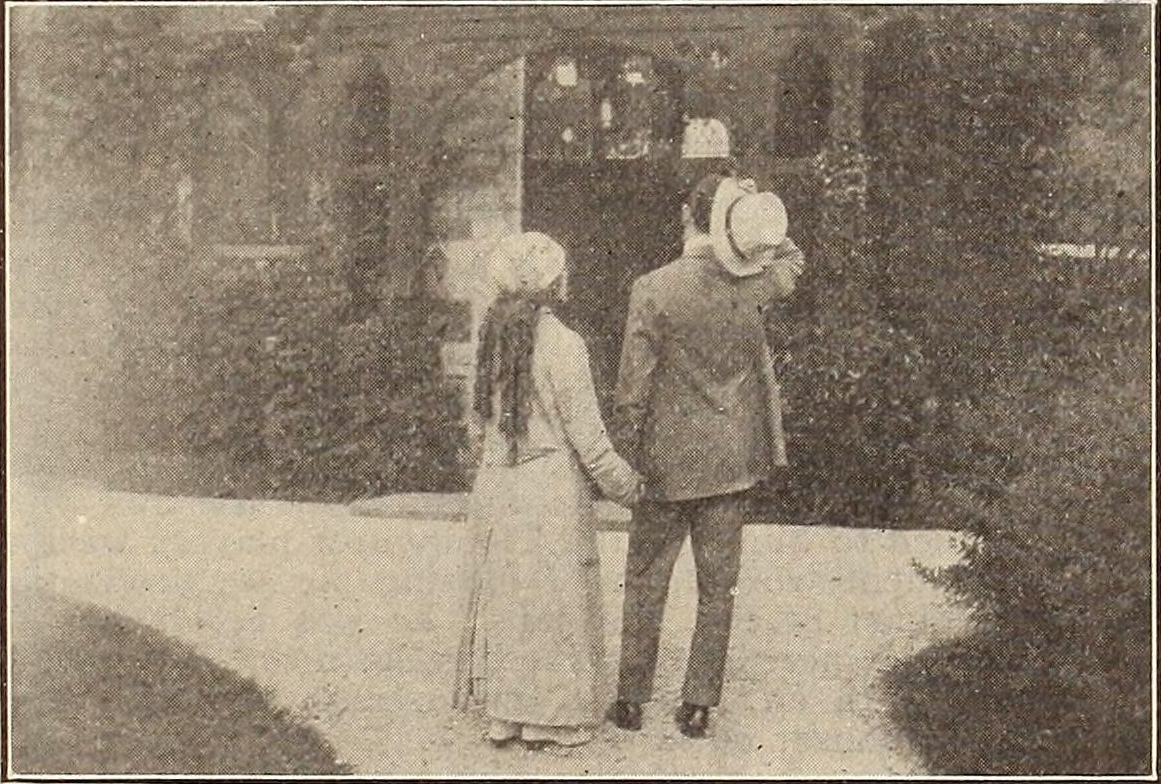
- Owen Moore and Mary Pickford
- Starring: Mary Pickford; Owen Moore
- Production company: Majestic Film Company
- Distributed by: Motion Picture Distributing and Sales Company
- Release date: November 26, 1911
- Running time: 1 reel
- Country: United States
- Language: Silent (English intertitles)

The Courting of Mary is a 1911 American lost silent comedy film starring Mary Pickford and Owen Moore. This was the first film released by Majestic Film Company.

== Plot ==
Mary is a tomboy, and Owen the teenage "woman-hater," and both are avoiding the attentions of the opposite sex, and by coincidence, meet at the same trout stream dividing their properties. Owen, in a bad temper, orders her away from his side of the stream and they quarrel, but as they argue, they become attracted to the other. They meet again and again and a love grows between them. Mary's Uncle Bill has an affection for a lonely spinster and they plan to be married, but she wants Mary to be married off first. Mary and Owen elope and are married, and when next seen, they are having breakfast on the seashore in the morning sun.

== Cast ==
- Mary Pickford as Mary
- Owen Moore as Owen
- William H. Brown as Uncle Bill
