= The Green-Eyed Devil =

- Directed by: James Kirkwood
- Written by: Daniel Carson Goodman
- Starring: Spottiswoode Aitken
- Distributed by: Mutual Film
- Release date: February 28, 1914
- Country: United States
- Languages: Silent; English intertitles

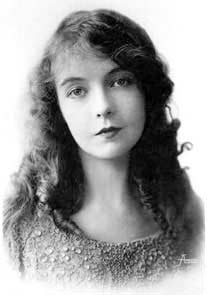
The film starred the 21-year-old Lillian Gish

The Green-Eyed Devil is a 1914 American short silent film directed by James Kirkwood. The film starred Earle Foxe, Spottiswoode Aitken and William Garwood in the lead roles.

The film was written by Daniel Carson Goodman (story) and George Pattullo (scenario).

== Cast ==
- Spottiswoode Aitken
- Earle Foxe
- William Garwood
- Lillian Gish
- Elaine Ivans
- George Siegmann
- Ralph Spears
- Henry B. Walthall

== See also ==
- List of American films of 1914
- Lillian Gish filmography
