= The Flying Torpedo =

1916 silent film by John B. O'Brien, Christy Cabanne

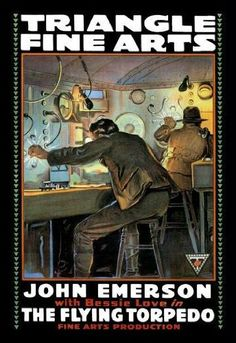
- Film poster
- Directed by: John B. O'Brien; Christy Cabanne
- Written by: Robert M. Baker; John Emerson; D. W. Griffith (uncredited)
- Produced by: D. W. Griffith
- Starring: John Emerson; Bessie Love
- Cinematography: George W. Hill
- Production company: Fine Arts Film Company
- Distributed by: Triangle Film Corporation
- Release date: March 12, 1916 (U.S.)
- Running time: 50 minutes; 5 reels
- Country: United States
- Language: Silent (English intertitles)

The Flying Torpedo is a 1916 American silent drama directed by John B. O'Brien and Christy Cabanne. It was produced by the Fine Arts Film Company and distributed by the Triangle Film Corporation. The film was written by John Emerson (who also stars), Robert M. Baker and D. W. Griffith (who was not credited). The film is now considered lost.

== Plot ==
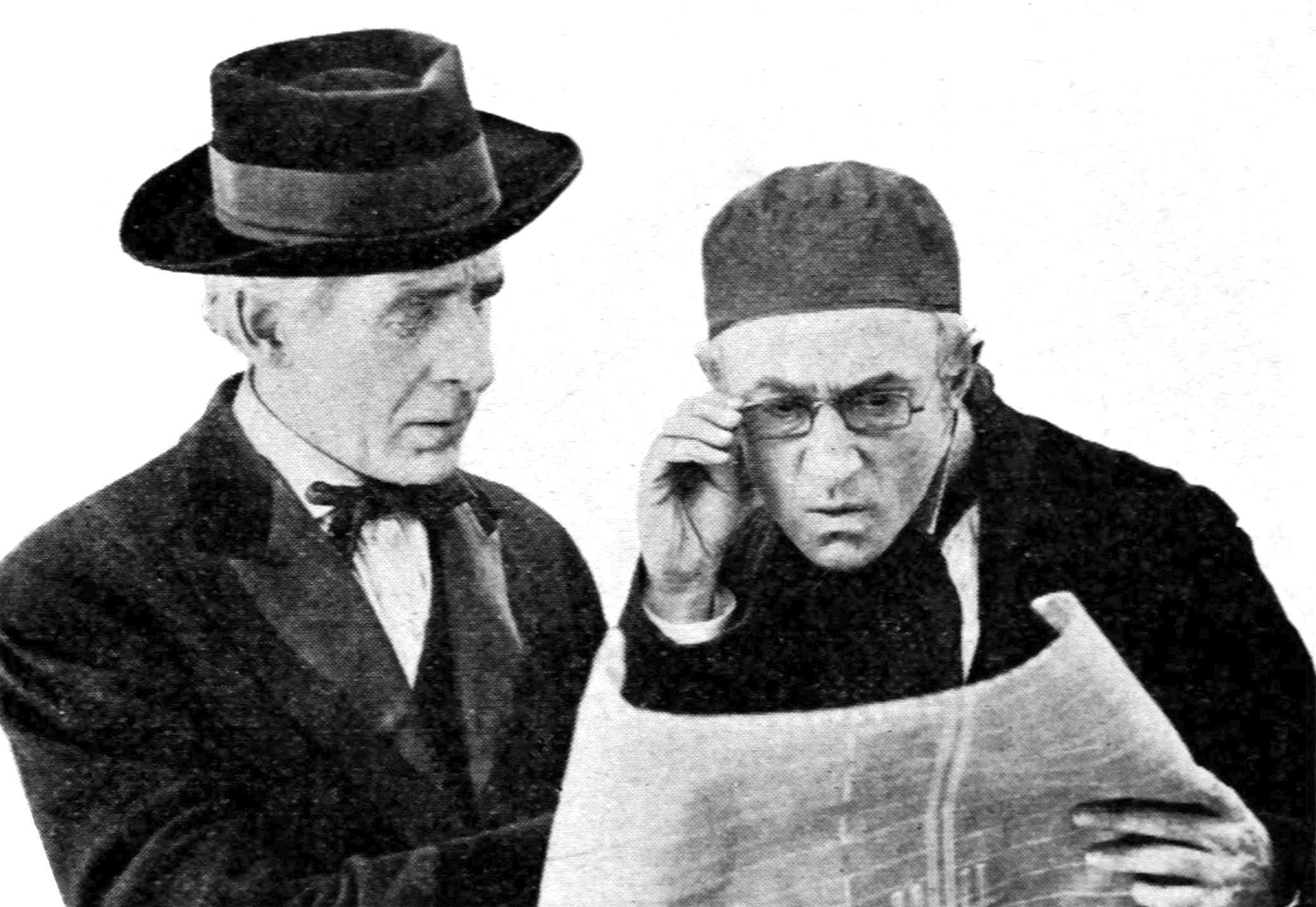
Thompson (Aitken) and Clavering (Emerson)

In 1921, novelist Winthrop Clavering, known as "The World's Greatest Detective", befriends young inventor Bartholomew Thompson, who has just invented a radio controlled flying bomb (weaponry that would come to be known as guided missiles). Bartholomew is soon murdered by spies, described as "yellow men from the East" in the film, who steal his new invention. Clavering and his Swedish maid Hulda set out to find the spies who have been invading the United States. Clavering and Hulda catch up with spies just as they invade California and force them out of the country with the same device they stole.

== Cast ==
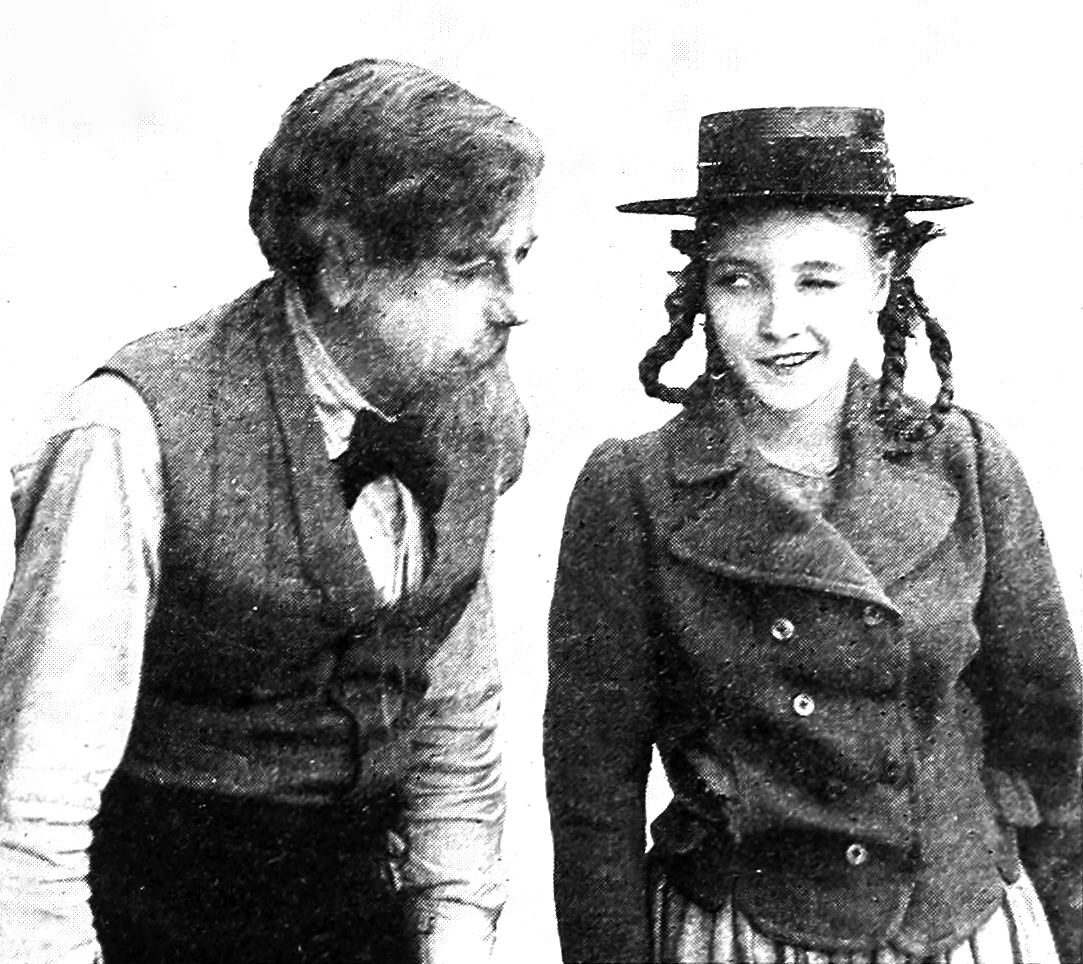
Hulda (Love) distracts the apothecary by winking at him

- John Emerson as Winthrop Clavering
- Spottiswoode Aitken as Bartholomew Thompson
- W. E. Lawrence as William Haverman
- Fred J. Butler as chief of international crooks
- Raymond Wells as accomplice
- Lucille Young as accomplice
- Eric von Stroheim as accomplice
- Viola Barry as Adelaide E. Thompson
- Bessie Love as Hulda
- Ralph Lewis as head of the board

Erich von Stroheim played a small supporting role as an evil German officer.

== Production notes ==
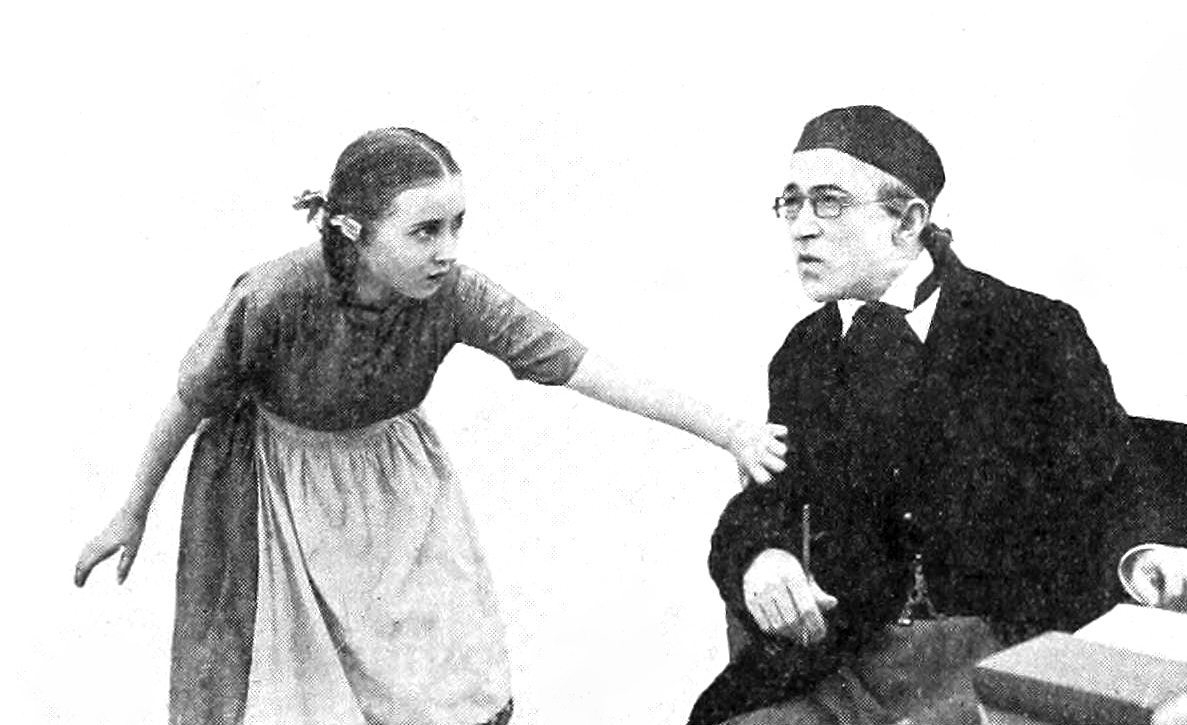
Hulda (Love) and Clavering (Emerson)

John Emerson had previously portrayed the role of Winthrop Clavering in the play The Conspiracy, from December 1912 to March 1914.

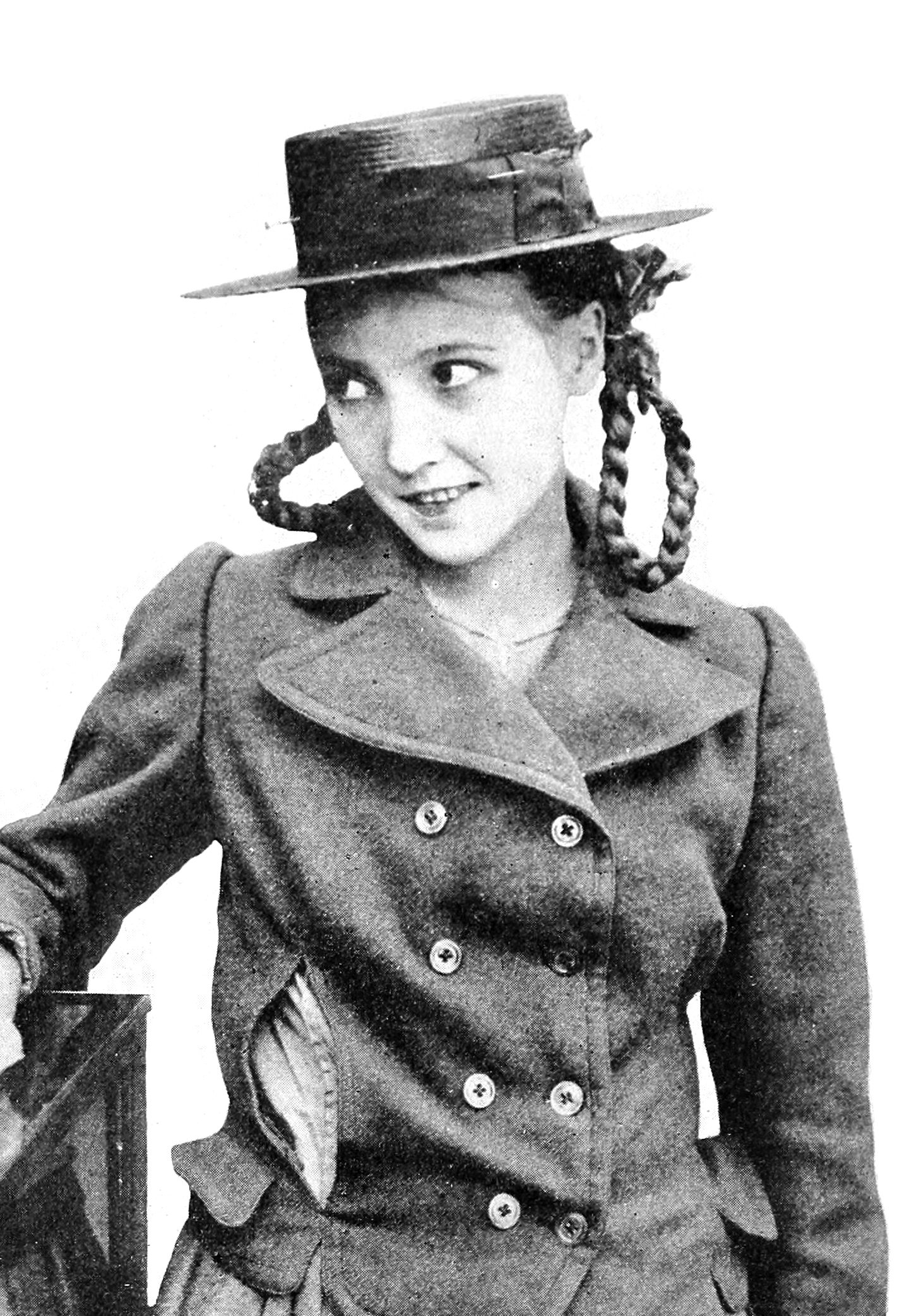
Bessie Love as Hulda, the Swedish maid

The film was produced by D. W. Griffith's film production company Fine Arts and was distributed by Triangle Film Corporation. Griffith also helped to write the film's scenario with lead John Emerson and Robert Baker. Griffith was also responsible for casting a teenage Bessie Love in the film whom he discovered and cast in several of his films in 1915. Filming began in July 1915 under the working title The Scarlet Band. Christy Cabanne directed the battle sequences.

== Sources ==
- Soister, John T. (2012). American Silent Horror, Science Fiction and Fantasy Feature Films, 1913–1929. McFarland & Company. ISBN 978-0-7864-8790-5.
