= The Children Pay =

1916 film

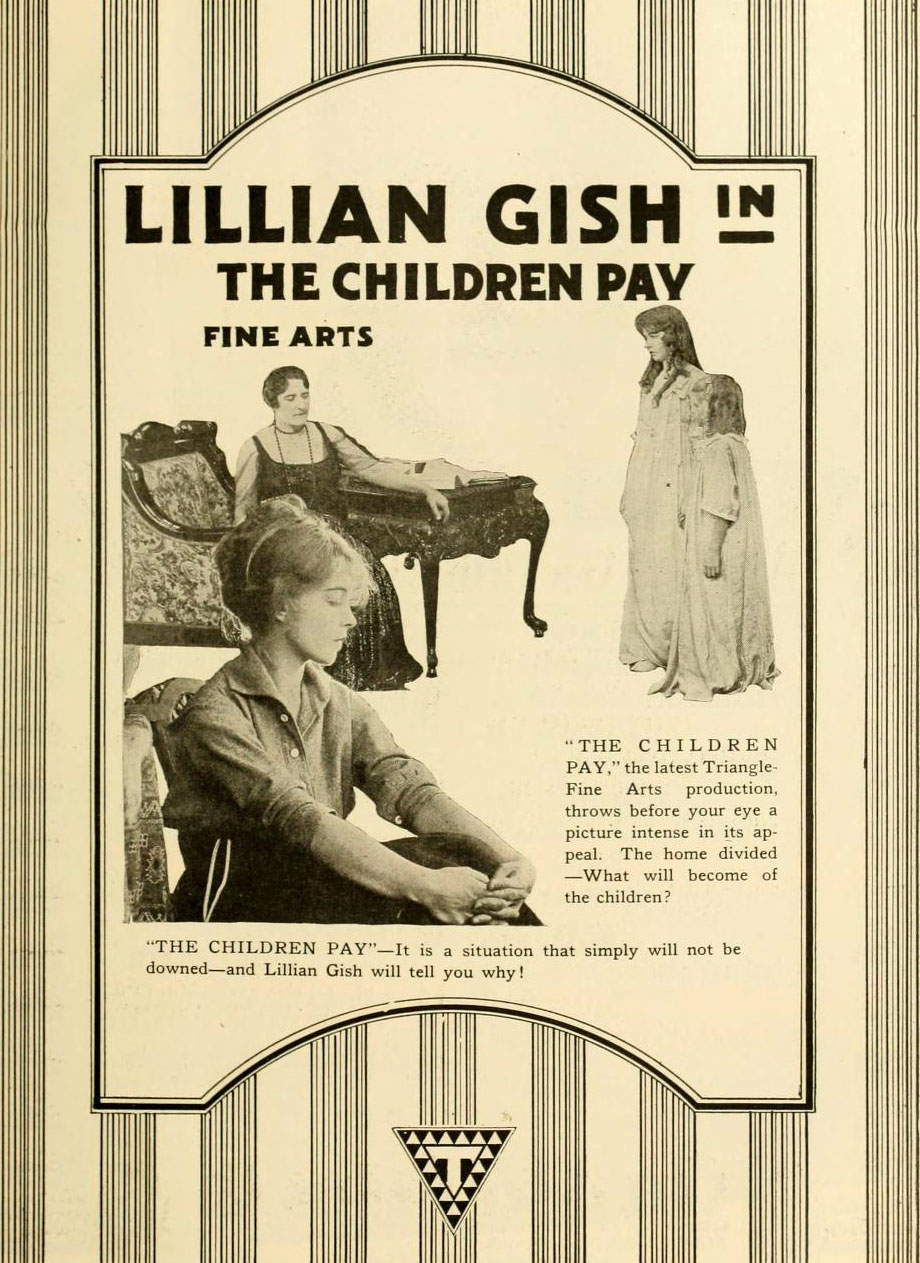
- Directed by: Lloyd Ingraham
- Written by: Anita Loos; Frank E. Woods
- Produced by: Fine Arts Film Company
- Starring: Lillian Gish
- Distributed by: Triangle Film Corporation
- Release date: November 26, 1916
- Running time: 50 minutes
- Country: United States
- Language: Silent with English intertitles

The Children Pay is a surviving 1916 American silent drama film directed by Lloyd Ingraham and starring Lillian Gish.

== Cast ==
- Lillian Gish as Millicent
- Violet Wilkey as Jean, her sister
- Keith Armour as Horace Craig
- Ralph Lewis as Theodore Ainsley, the girls' father
- Loyola O'Connor as Elinor Ainsley, their mother
- Alma Rubens as Editha, their stepmother
- Jennie Lee as Susan, their governess
- Robert Lohmeyer as Signor Zucca
- Carl Stockdale as Judge Mason
- Tom Wilson as Officer
- Mazie Radford (uncredited)
- Madame Sul-Te-Wan (uncredited)

== See also ==
- List of American films of 1916
- Lillian Gish filmography
