= The Angel of Contention =

1914 film

- Directed by: John B. O'Brien
- Written by: Will Levington Comfort; George Pattullo
- Starring: Spottiswoode Aitken; Lillian Gish
- Release date: July 25, 1914
- Country: United States
- Language: Silent with English intertitles

The Angel of Contention is a 1914 American short drama film directed by John B. O'Brien and starring Lillian Gish.

== Cast ==
- Spottiswoode Aitken
- Lillian Gish
- George Siegmann
- Raoul Walsh

== See also ==
- List of American films of 1914
- Lillian Gish filmography
