= William Lowery =

American actor (1885–1941)

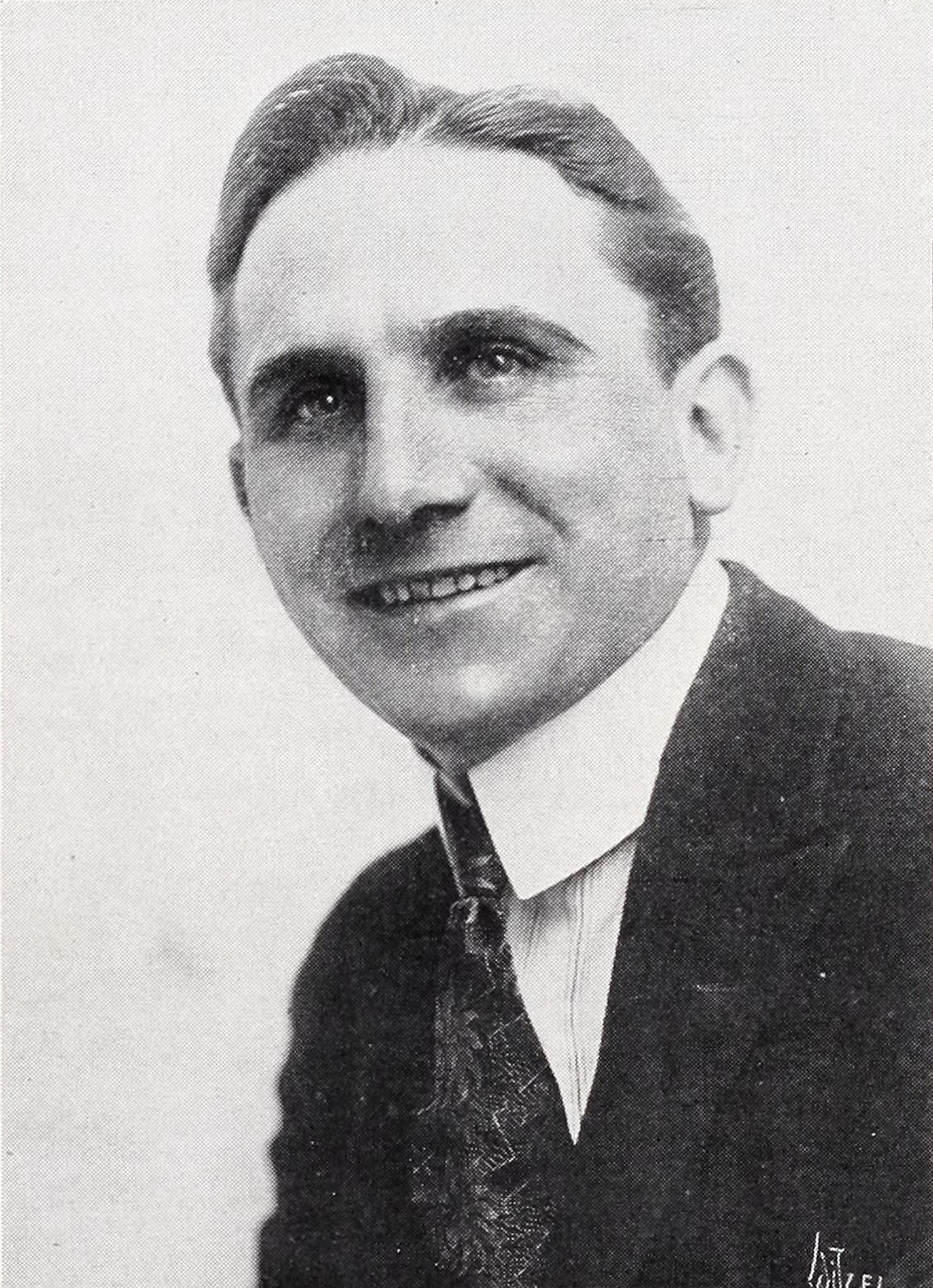
- Born: July 22, 1885; St. Louis, Missouri, U.S.
- Died: November 15, 1941 (aged 56); Los Angeles, California U.S.
- Occupation: Actor
- Years active: 1914 – 1928

William Lowery (July 22, 1885 – November 15, 1941) was an American silent film actor. He was born in St. Louis, Missouri, and was signed by the Thanhouser Company in 1914.

Lowery's parents were actors, and he first acted at age 9. He enlisted in the Army in 1901 and fought during the Boxer uprising in China, achieving a commission as second lieutenant. He performed with a stock theater company in Los Angeles in 1906 before he began working in films. His first film was The Ten of Spades (1914) also starring William Garwood. He starred in about 60 films between 1914 and his retirement from film in 1927. He died on November 15, 1941, in Los Angeles.

== Partial filmography ==
- The Ten of Spades (1914)
- A Ticket to Red Horse Gulch (1914)
- A Turn of the Cards (1914)
- The Tear That Burned (1914)
- The Lucky Transfer (1915)
- Captain Macklin (1915)
- The Burned Hand (1915)
- Double Trouble (1915)
- Sold for Marriage (1916)
- Reggie Mixes In (1916)
- The Man from Painted Post (1917)
- Her Moment (1918)
- The Nut (1921)
- Robin Hood (1922)
- Dangerous Trails (1923)
- McGuire of the Mounted (1923)
- Why Women Remarry (1923)
- Thundering Hoofs (1924)
- Battling Buddy (1924)
- Red Hot Tires (1925)
- Makers of Men (1925)
- Tricks (1925)
- Crossed Signals (1926)
- The Call of the Klondike (1926)
