= Stage Struck (1917 film) =

1917 film by Edward Morrissey

- Directed by: Edward Morrissey
- Written by: Roy Somerville
- Produced by: Fine Arts Films
- Starring: Dorothy Gish
- Cinematography: Karl Brown
- Distributed by: Triangle Film Corporation
- Release date: February 25, 1917
- Running time: 50 minutes
- Country: United States
- Language: Silent film (English intertitles)

Stage Struck is a 1917 American silent drama film directed by Edward Morrissey and starring Dorothy Gish. It was produced by Fine Arts Films and distributed through Triangle Film Corporation.

A copy survives in the Library of Congress collection and Cinemateca Brasileira, São Paulo, Brazil.

== Cast ==
- Dorothy Gish - Ruth Colby
- Frank Bennett - Jack Martin
- Kate Toncray - Mrs Martin
- Jennie Lee - Mrs Teedles
- Spottiswoode Aitken - The Judge
- Fred Warren - Jack Schneider
- Marzie Radford - The Slavey

uncredited

- Carmel Myers
- Madame Sul-Te-Wan
