= The Old Fisherman's Story =

- Directed by: John B. O'Brien
- Produced by: Majestic Film Company
- Starring: Spottiswoode Aitken
- Distributed by: Mutual Film
- Release date: December 27, 1914
- Running time: 2 reels
- Country: United States
- Language: Silent..English titles

The Old Fisherman's Story is a 1914 silent short film directed by John B. O'Brien. It starred Seena Owen, Mary Alden, Spottiswoode Aitken, Arthur Maude, Jack Conway and Raoul Walsh, the latter two later directors.

== Cast ==
- Spottiswoode Aitken - Old Fisherman
- Raoul Walsh - Ben
- Jack Conway - Ned
- Mary Alden - The Gypsy
- Seena Owen - Mary Cresswood(* as Signe Auen)
- Arthur Maude
- Lucille Browne
