= The Burned Hand =

1915 film

- Directed by: Tod Browning
- Starring: Miriam Cooper; Cora Drew
- Release date: June 13, 1915
- Running time: 2 reels
- Country: United States
- Language: Silent with English intertitles

The Burned Hand is a 1915 American short drama film directed by Tod Browning. The film was produced by the Majestic Motion Picture Company.

== Plot ==
A young graduate falls in love with a woman whose parents are in the midst of an acrimonious divorce. When her Mother and Father go to court, the Father is denied his daughter, so he subsequently abducts her and takes her to another state. The graduate who had fallen in love with her, then attempts to track her down, with his two friends, and takes her away. In the process of taking her away from her Father, his hand gets burnt with a poker, which the Father uses to as a means of identifying him, as he attempts to track him down.

== Cast ==
- Miriam Cooper as Marietta
- Cora Drew as Marietta's mother
- William Hinckley as Billy Rider
- Jack Hull
- William Lowery as Marietta's father
- F. A. Turner (as Fred A. Turner)
- Charles West (as Charles H. West)
- Violet Wilkey
- William Wolbert as Billy's friend
