= The Pointing Finger (1919 film) =

1919 silent film directed by Edward A. Kull & Edward Morrissey

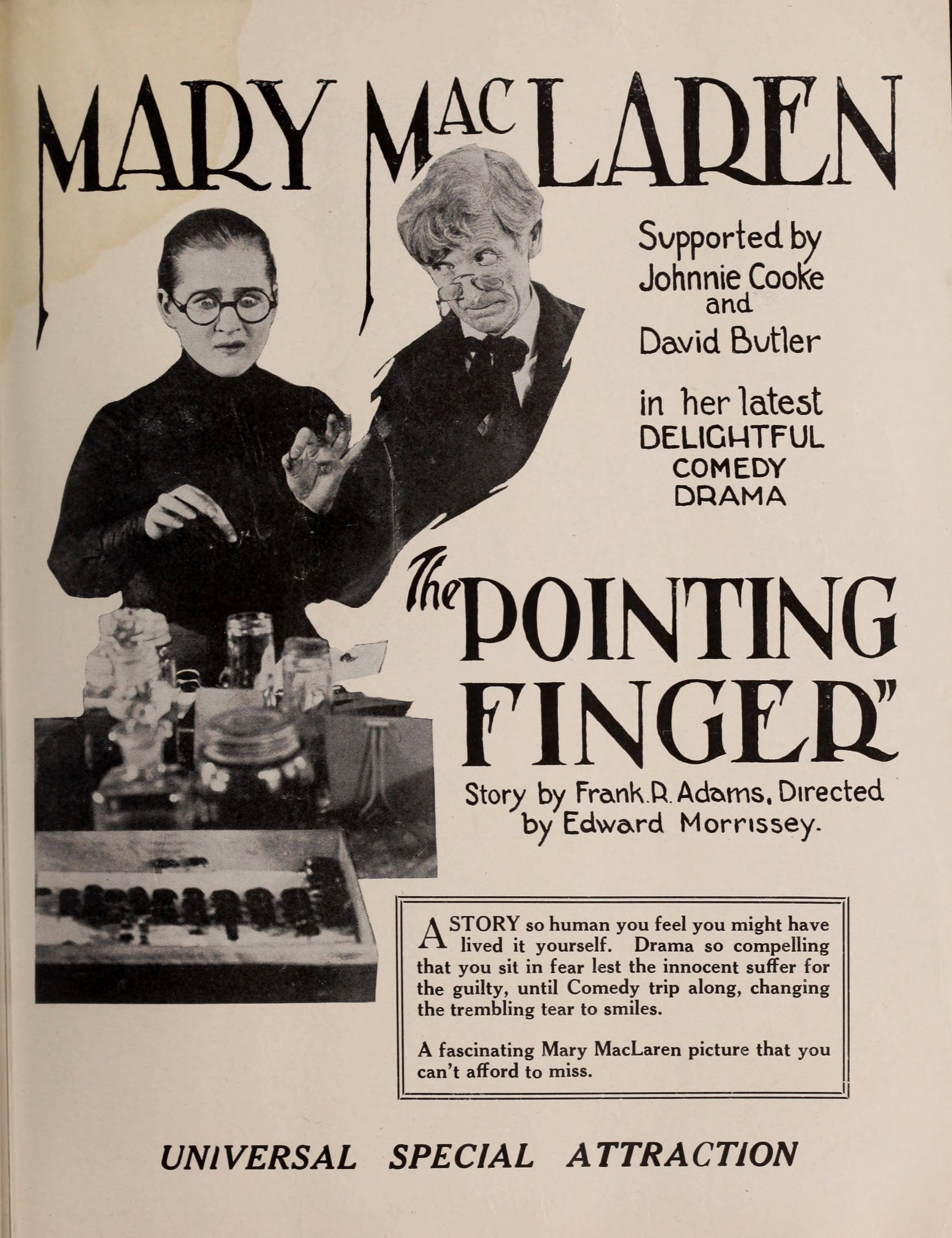
- Directed by: Edward A. Kull; Edward Morrissey
- Written by: Violet Clark
- Based on: the short story, "No Experience Required" by Frank R. Adams
- Produced by: Tod Browning
- Starring: Mary MacLaren; David Butler; Johnnie Cook
- Cinematography: William E. Fildew; Howard Oswald
- Production company: Universal Film Manufacturing Company
- Release date: December 1, 1919 (US)
- Running time: 5 reels
- Country: United States
- Language: English

The Pointing Finger, also known as No Experience Required, is a 1919 American silent drama film, directed by Edward A. Kull and Edward Morrissey. Morrissey began directing the project, but was replaced by Kull in late August or early September 1919. It stars Mary MacLaren, David Butler, and Johnnie Cook, and was released on December 1, 1919. There are no known archival holdings of the film, so it is presumably a lost film.

== Plot ==
Mary Murphy, the eldest orphan in an orphanage, steals a dress and $3 before escaping to the city. That same night, the orphanage superintendent, Grosset, steals $10,000, and Mary is suspected of the crime. She disguises herself and obtains a position as an assistant to entomologist William Saxton, who dislikes young women who are attractive and fashionably dressed. Saxton's nephew, David, however, sees through her disguise and falls in love with her.

Grosset visits Saxton's home and threatens to expose Mary. She later discovers him robbing Saxton's safe, but Grosset accuses her of the crime. Saxton, who has been hiding behind a curtain, has overheard the entire conversation and confirms Mary's innocence. Grosset is arrested, and Mary and David marry.

== Cast list ==
- Mary MacLaren as Mary Murphy
- David Butler as David
- Johnnie Cook as William Saxton
- Carl Stockdale as Grosset
- Lydia Knott as Matron
- Charlotte Woods as Matron's assistant
