= The Tear That Burned =

1914 film

- Directed by: Jack O'Brien
- Written by: Anthony Paul Kelly
- Starring: Josephine Crowell; Lillian Gish
- Distributed by: Mutual Film
- Release date: November 8, 1914
- Running time: 20 minutes
- Country: United States
- Language: Silent with English intertitles

The Tear That Burned is a 1914 American short drama film directed by Jack O'Brien.

== Cast ==
- Josephine Crowell
- John T. Dillon (as John Dillon)
- Mae Gaston
- Lillian Gish
- William Lowery (as William C. Lowery)
- Blanche Sweet

== See also ==
- Lillian Gish filmography
- Blanche Sweet filmography
