= The Ten of Spades =

1914 film

The Ten of Spades' was a 1914 American silent short film directed by starring William Garwood, Victory Bateman, J.H. Horsey, William Lowery, Muriel Ostriche, C.E. Rogers, Vera Sisson, Josef Swickard, Metta White and Mabel Wright.
