= Souls Triumphant =

1917 film

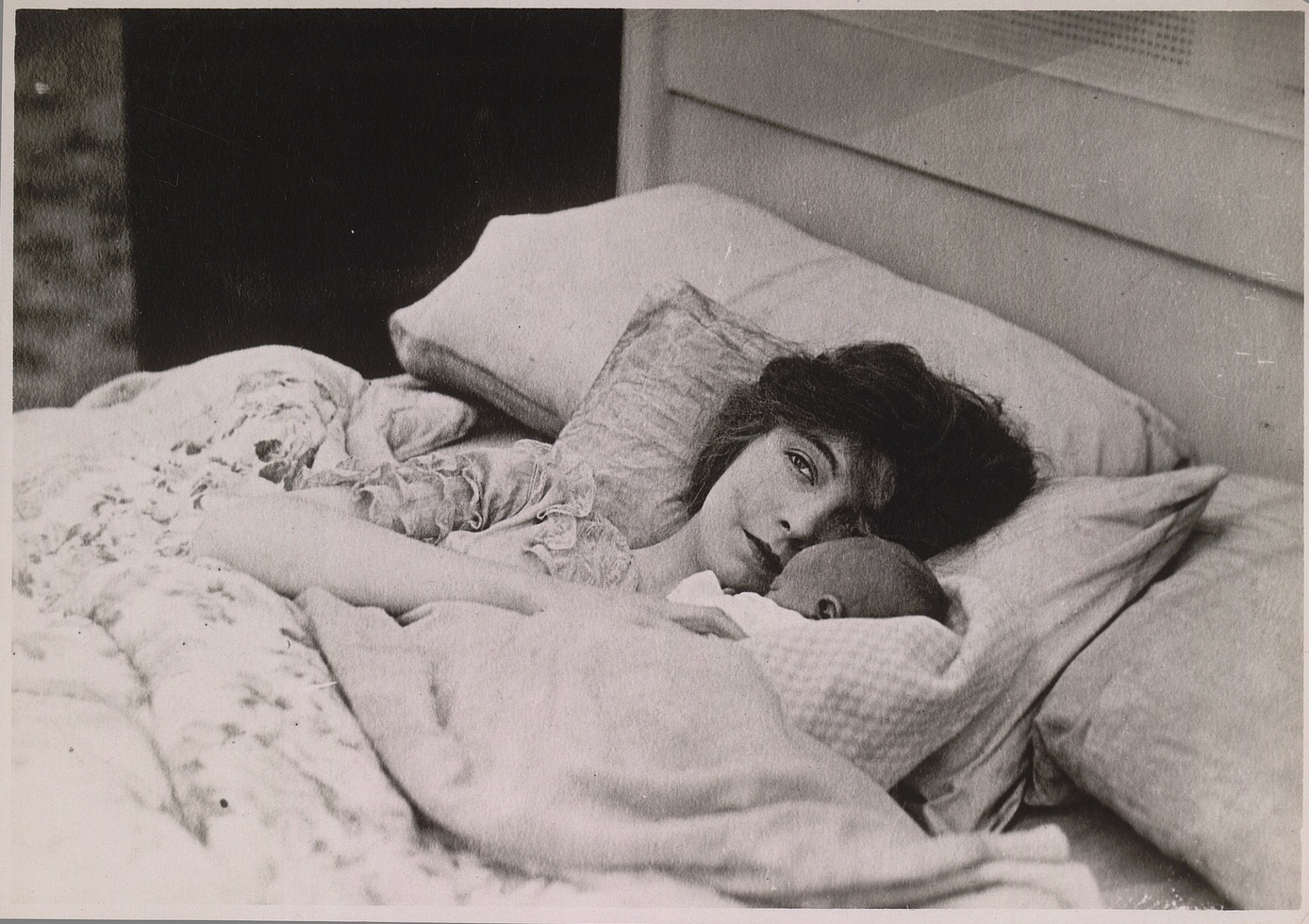
- Directed by: John B. O'Brien
- Written by: Mary H. O'Connor
- Produced by: Fine Arts Film Company
- Starring: Lillian Gish
- Distributed by: Triangle Film Corporation
- Release date: May 20, 1917
- Running time: 50 minutes
- Country: United States
- Language: Silent with English intertitles

Souls Triumphant is a 1917 American drama film directed by John B. O'Brien and starring Lillian Gish. This is considered to be a lost film.

== Cast ==
- Lillian Gish as Lillian Vale
- Wilfred Lucas as Robert Powers
- Spottiswoode Aitken as Josiah Vale
- Louise Hamilton as Hattie Lee
- Kate Bruce
- Jennie Lee

== See also ==
- Lillian Gish filmography
