= Captain Macklin =

1915 film

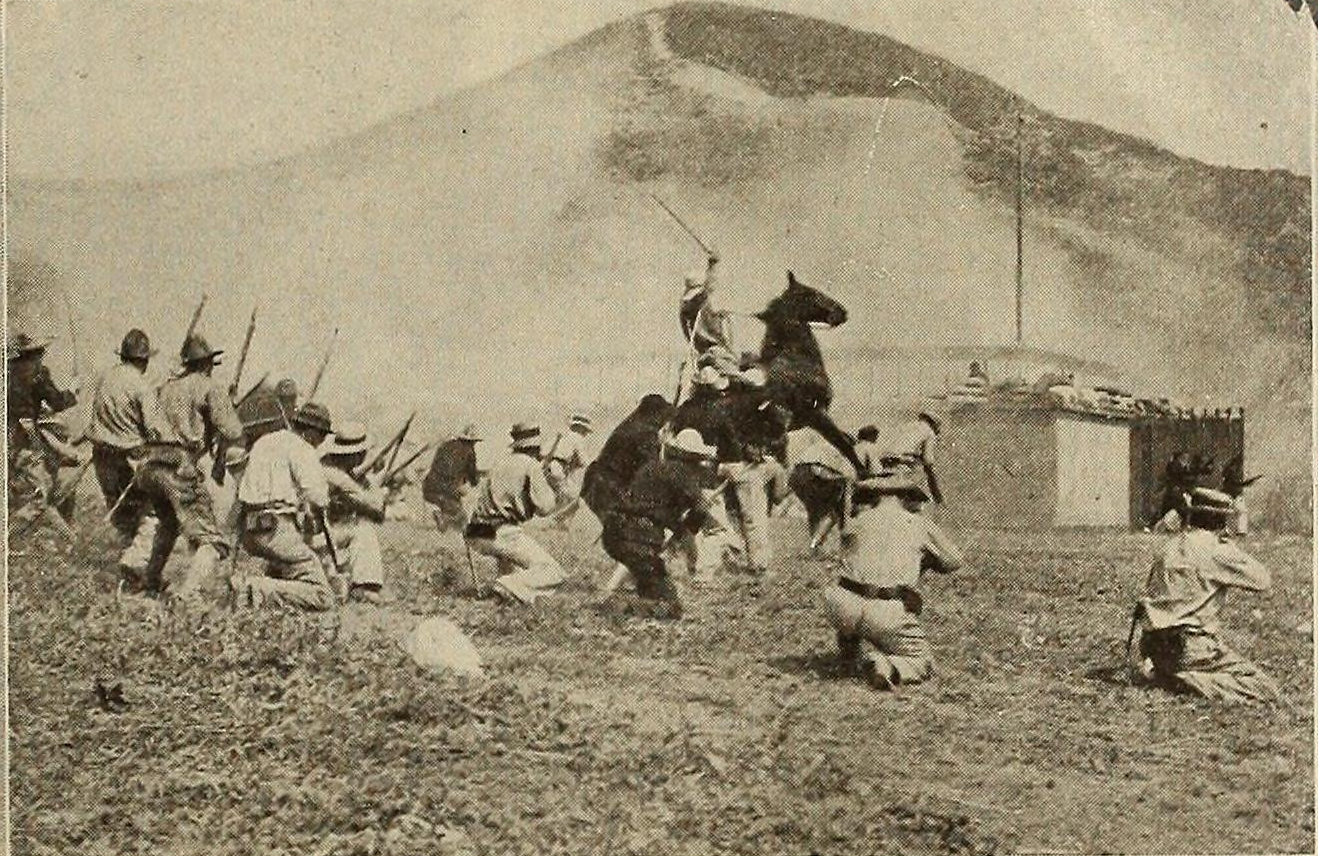
- Directed by: John B. O'Brien; Emmett Flynn (ass't director); Eric von Stroheim (ass't director)
- Written by: Richard Harding Davis; Russell E. Smith
- Starring: Jack Conway; Lillian Gish
- Cinematography: Harry B. Harris
- Production company: Majestic Motion Picture Company
- Distributed by: Mutual Film
- Release date: April 22, 1915
- Running time: 40 minutes
- Country: United States
- Language: Silent with English intertitles

Captain Macklin is a 1915 American silent short drama film directed by John B. O'Brien. A lost film.

== Cast ==
- Jack Conway as Capt. Royal Macklin
- Lillian Gish as Beatrice
- Spottiswoode Aitken as Gen. Laquerre
- William Lowery as Heinz (as W.E. Lowery)
- Dark Cloud as Gen. Garcia
- Erich von Stroheim as Officer on Horseback (uncredited)

== See also ==
- List of American films of 1915
- Lillian Gish filmography
