= Those Who Dare =

1924 film

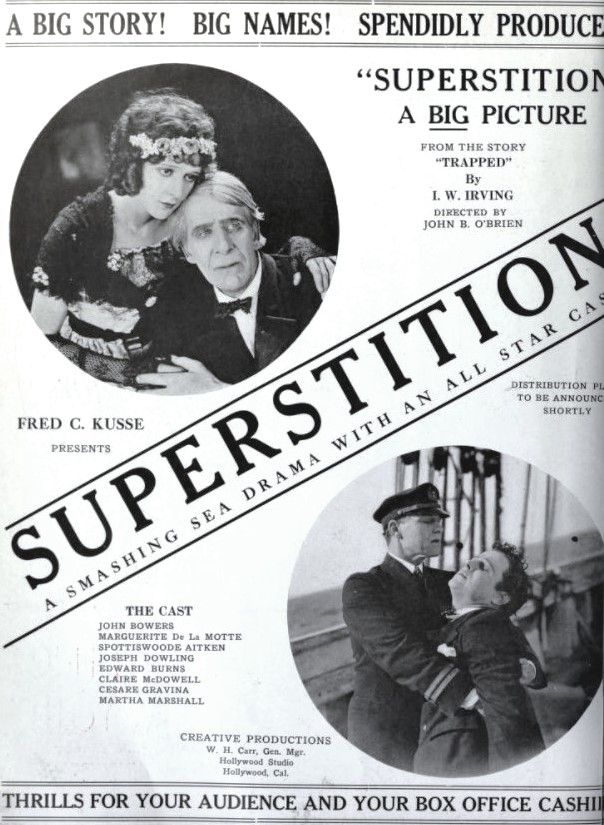
- Advertisement from 1923 using the film's working title Superstition
- Directed by: John B. O'Brien
- Written by: Frank S. Beresford
- Story by: I. W. Irving
- Starring: Marguerite De La Motte; John Bowers; Joseph J. Dowling
- Cinematography: Devereaux Jennings
- Production company: Creative Pictures
- Release date: November 15, 1924
- Running time: 70 minutes
- Country: United States
- Language: Silent (English intertitles)

Those Who Dare is a 1924 American silent drama film directed by John B. O'Brien and starring John Bowers, Marguerite De La Motte, and Joseph J. Dowling. Though some reference books consider it a horror film, it is not known how overt the voodoo element was, since the film no longer exists. The film co-stars a couple of actors however who were associated with the 1920s horror film genre, Sheldon Lewis (who starred in Dr. Jekyll and Mr. Hyde (1920 Haydon film)), and Cesare Gravina (who starred with Lon Chaney in The Man Who Laughs, 1928). Director O'Brien quit directing in 1926, and spent the last ten years of his life acting in bit parts.

== Plot ==
Captain Manning, the owner of the ship The Swallow, is ordered to remove it from a town's harbor because it has the reputation for being cursed. Afterwards he settles down in an old folk's home where he tells the story of how he came to own the Swallow. It seems that years before, he found the ship adrift at sea, manned by a crew of mutineers, whose captain was struggling to maintain control over his crew. Manning learns that the men were under a peculiar voodoo practitioner's influence. He succeeds in besting the voodoo master and bringing the mutinous crew back under control, at which time the owner gives him the ship.

== Cast ==
- John Bowers as Captain Manning
- Marguerite De La Motte as Marjorie
- Joseph J. Dowling as David Rollins
- Claire McDowell as Mrs. Rollins
- Martha Marshall as Cecilia Thorne
- Edmund Burns as Harry Rollins
- Spottiswoode Aitken as Thorne Wtherell
- Sheldon Lewis as Serpent Smith
- Cesare Gravina as Panka
- June Norton
- J. Farrell MacDonald
- Grace Gordon
- Fred Walker

== Preservation ==
A print of Those Who Dare is held by the Cineteca Italiana in Milan.

== Bibliography ==
- Munden, Kenneth White. The American Film Institute Catalog of Motion Pictures Produced in the United States, Part 1. University of California Press, 1997.
