= Maggie Pepper =

1919 film by Chester Withey

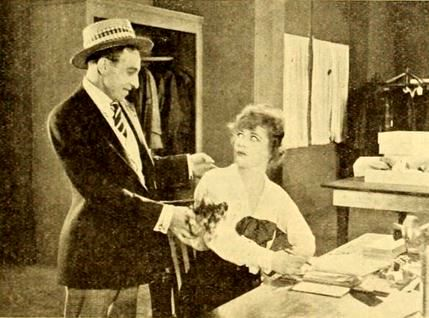
- Film still with Ray Hatton and Ethel Clayton
- Directed by: Chester "Chet" Withey
- Written by: Charles Klein (play); Gardner Hunter (scenario)
- Produced by: Adolph Zukor; Jesse Lasky
- Starring: Ethel Clayton
- Cinematography: David Abel
- Distributed by: Paramount Pictures
- Release date: February 23, 1919
- Running time: 5 reels
- Country: United States
- Language: Silent (English intertitles)

Maggie Pepper is a lost 1919 American silent comedy-drama film directed by Chester Withey and starring Ethel Clayton. This film is based on a hit 1911 play by Charles Klein which was a winning success for stage actress Rose Stahl at the Harris Theatre.

It is not known whether the film currently survives.

Both Rose Stahl's manager, Henry B. Harris, and the original playwright, Charles Klein, died in notable disasters: Harris on the RMS Titanic in 1912, and Klein on the RMS Lusitania in 1915.

== Plot ==
As described in a film magazine, Maggie Pepper is a self-reliant and snappy saleswoman who supports a young girl Claire, the daughter of her sister-in-law Ada, who is in jail for shoplifting. Maggie is being courted by Jake Rothschild and has just rejected him when the young owner of the store, Joe Holbrook, comes upon them. She mistakes Joe for a job seeker and advises him to stay away from a concern that is dying painlessly. Joe becomes interested and finds that the peppery young woman has ideas and vision. He is already engaged, but finds that the comparison of the women favors Maggie. Maggie, the victim of envy, is discharged. Her sister-in-law Ada, now released and led back to crime by a second husband Sam, plans to do shoplifting at the Holbrook store. Maggie only wants the child to be free from bad influences, and accepts a job offer in Pittsburgh to get a better environment. There is a sensational attempt to steal the child, which brings Holbrook to the rescue. He feigns injury to keep a hold on Maggie, and ends up winning her.

== Cast ==
- Ethel Clayton as Maggie Pepper
- Elliott Dexter as Joe Holbrook
- Winifred Greenwood as Ada Darkin
- Tully Marshall as Sam Darkin
- Edna Mae Wilson as Claire Darkin
- Raymond Hatton as Jake Rothschild
- Marcia Manon as Alice Keane
- Clyde Benson as John Hargen
- Billy Elmer as Dud Corey
- Bud Duncan as Delivery Boy
- C. H. Geldart as Detective (aka Clarence Geldart)
- Fay Holderness as Mrs. Thatcher

== Klein and Harris ==
Both the author of the original stage play, Charles Klein, and Rose Stahl's manager, Henry B. Harris, died at sea.

Harris, a theatrical producer, was also the owner and lessee of the Harris Theatre on 42nd Street where Maggie Pepper played. In April 1913 he was in London, arranging future performances of Maggie Pepper with Stahl and the original American cast. Harris also acquired the US rights to The Miracle, the world's first full-colour narrative feature film which had been showing at the Royal Opera House. However, Harris died after the ship he and his wife were travelling on, the RMS Titanic, hit an iceberg, although his wife survived.

Charles Klein died in the sinking of the RMS Lusitania in 1915. Another victim on the Lusitania was Charles Frohman, also a well-known theatrical producer. Frohman had produced one of Klein's first successes, Heartsease, with Henry Miller, and was also the manager and lessee of the Park Theatre, Boston, where Rose Stahl (managed by Harris) played in The Chorus Lady in 1908.
