= The Quicksands =

1914 film

- Directed by: Christy Cabanne
- Written by: Christy Cabanne
- Starring: Courtenay Foote; Lillian Gish
- Distributed by: Mutual Film
- Release date: May 1, 1914
- Running time: 10 minutes
- Country: United States
- Language: Silent with English intertitles

The Quicksands is a 1914 American short drama film directed by Christy Cabanne.

== Plot ==
Jack Dacey (Courtenay Foote) is a temperamental artist who leaves his wife (Lillian Gish) and his home for a solo stay at a resort. He meets an attractive and wealthy young woman (Fay Tincher) there. Dacey's wife learns his whereabouts. On her way to see him, she slips into quicksand; Dacey witnesses her fall, but fails to act. Another man (Douglas Gerrard) rescues her instead. Dacey, believing his wife has died in the quicksand, announces his engagement to the young heiress. When his wife appears at the resort, Dacey runs away, and drowns in the same quicksand.

== Cast ==
- Courtenay Foote
- Lillian Gish
- Fay Tincher
- Douglas Gerrard
- Mary Alden
- Bob Burns (as Robert Burns)
- F. A. Turner (as Fred A. Turner)
