= The Good Bad-Man =

1916 film

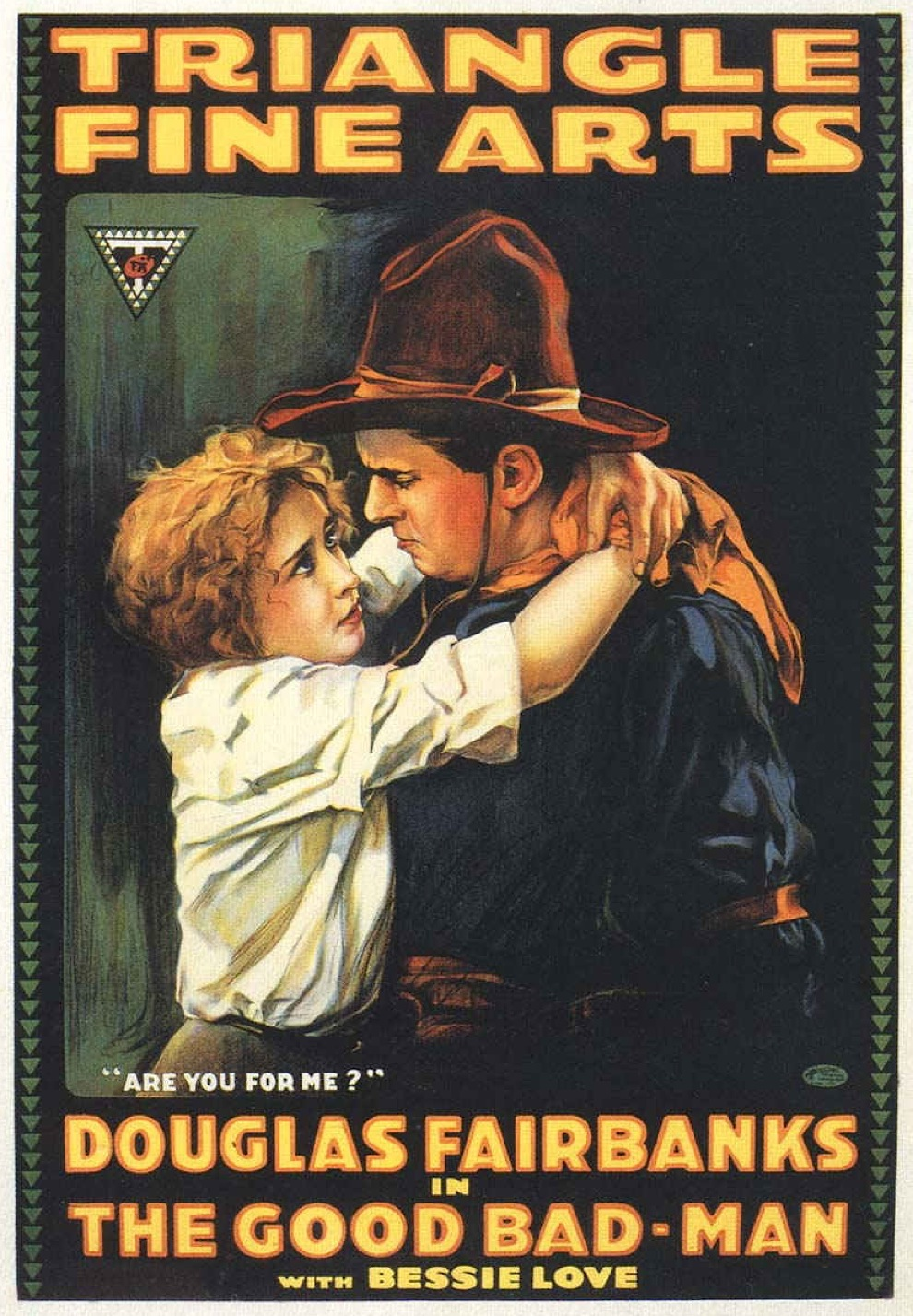
- Theatrical poster
- Directed by: Allan Dwan
- Written by: Douglas Fairbanks
- Produced by: Douglas Fairbanks
- Starring: Douglas Fairbanks
- Cinematography: Victor Fleming
- Production company: Fine Arts Film Company
- Distributed by: Triangle Film Corporation (1916 release); Tri-Stone Pictures (1923 re-release)
- Release dates: April 21, 1916 (Original release); October 19, 1923 (Re-release)
- Running time: 50 minutes; 5 reels
- Country: United States
- Language: Silent (English intertitles)

The Good Bad-Man (Note: The title correctly has a hyphen between Bad and Man, which appears on posters for the film and in contemporaneous reviews.) is a 1916 American silent Western film directed by Allan Dwan. The film was written by Douglas Fairbanks and produced by Fairbanks and the Fine Arts Film Company. It stars Fairbanks and Bessie Love.

The film was originally distributed by Triangle Film Corporation and was re-edited and re-released by Tri-Stone Pictures in 1923.

Full film

== Plot ==
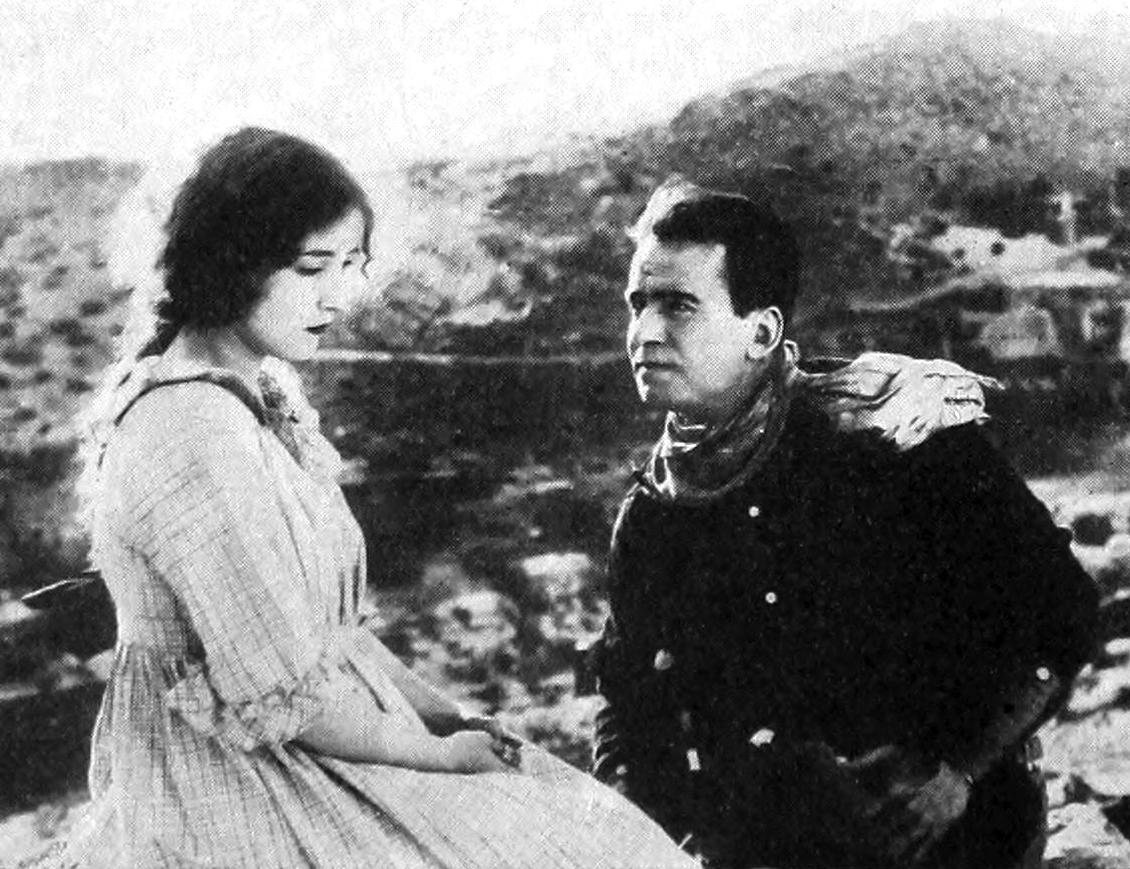
Bessie Love and Douglas Fairbanks as Amy and Passin' Through

"Passin' Through" is a benevolent outlaw who robs trains to provide for fatherless children in the Old West. He knows little of his personal history but is pursued by a U.S. Marshal who does. Along the way, he meets Amy and falls in love with her. A rival bandit, "The Wolf", is also competing for Amy's affections, but Passin' and Amy ultimately marry.

== Cast ==
- Douglas Fairbanks as "Passin' Through"
- Sam De Grasse as Bud Frazer / The Wolf
- Pomeroy Cannon as Bob Evans the Marshal
- Joseph Singleton as Weazel
- Bessie Love as Amy
- Mary Alden as Jane Stuart
- George Beranger as Thomas Stuart
- Fred Burns as Sheriff
- Charles Stevens as a Bandit (uncredited)
- Jim Mason as a Bandit (uncredited)

== Preservation status ==
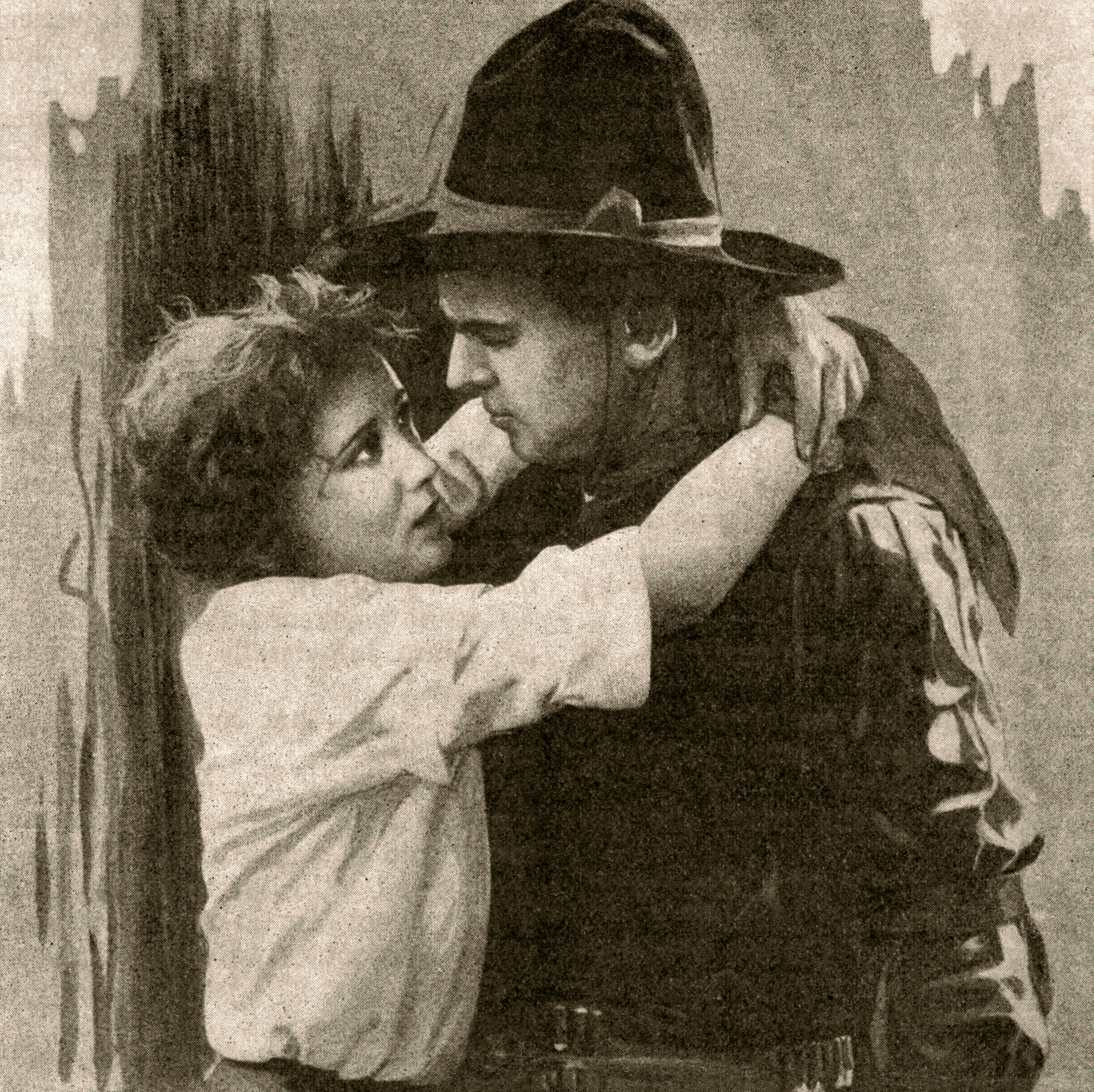
Love and Fairbanks in a still from the film (Note: A still photo from the film published in the November 1916 issue of Overland Monthly was used to illustrate the short story "Coyote o' the Rio Grande". Coyote o' the Rio Grande is not an alternate title for the film.)

No print of the original 1916 release is known to survive, but a print of the 1923 re-release is preserved at the Library of Congress.

On May 31, 2014, a restored print of the 1923 version was screened at the San Francisco Silent Film Festival at the Castro Theatre. This print included an original title card stating it was "Supervised by D. W. Griffith".

== Release and reception ==
At the film's Los Angeles premiere, Bessie Love performed the song "The Rosary" by Ethelbert Woodbridge Nevin.

The film received positive reviews. The cast and direction were particularly praised in contemporaneous trade publications.

== Legacy ==
Fairbanks biographer Jeffrey Vance considers The Good Bad-Man significant for its insight into Fairbanks's personal life. Vance wrote:

Passin' Through's unresolved relationship with an absent father and concerns of illegitimacy were also central to the identity of the offscreen Fairbanks, born Douglas Ulman. His mother, Ella Fairbanks (née Marsh), had been twice married before meeting attorney H. Charles Ulman, the son of German-Jewish immigrants. An alcoholic and bigamist, Ulman abandoned his new family when Douglas was five years old. At that time, Douglas's mother changed the family's surname to that of her deceased first husband, "Fairbanks." H. Charles Ulman died in 1915 and was undoubtedly in Fairbanks's thoughts in early 1916 when he developed the story of The Good Bad Man. The personal concerns and anxieties Fairbanks felt toward his identity were deeply concealed, which makes their exploration with his film's restless hero fascinating to watch.

== Bibliography ==
- Lombardi, Frederic (2013). "Part One: The Lusty Child". Allan Dwan and the Rise and Decline of the Hollywood Studios. McFarland. ISBN 978-0-7864-3485-5.
