= Majestic Film Company =

Defunct film studio

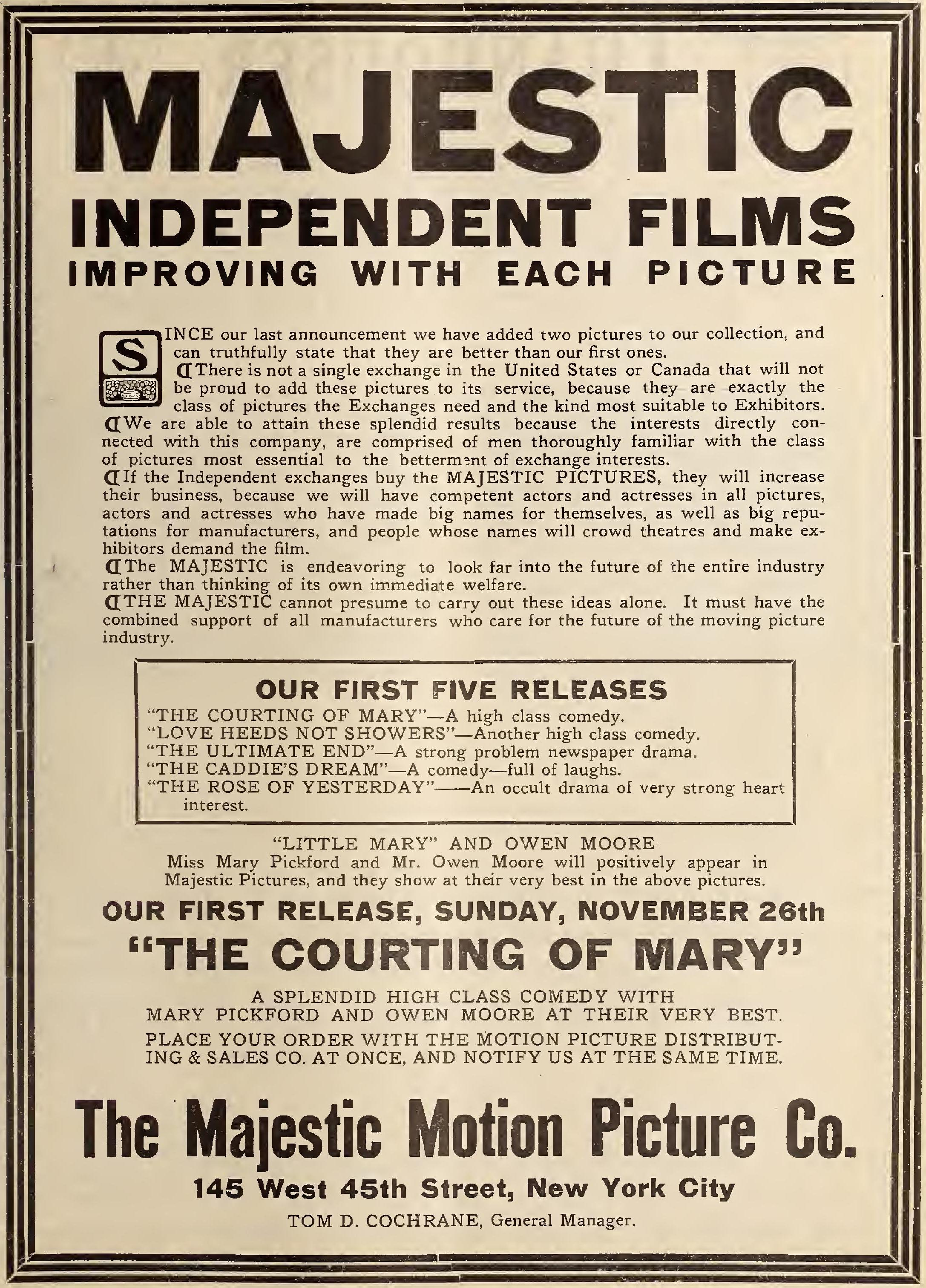
Majestic Motion Picture Company ad in Moving Picture News, 1911

Majestic Film Company, also known as Majestic Motion Pictures, was a film studio established in 1911. It became an affiliate of the Mutual Film Corporation and was combined with Reliance Film Company to form Reliance-Majestic Studios.

If was formed by Harry Aitken drawing on managerial talent from Independent Moving Pictures (IMP) as well as pulling over young star Mary Pickford. Thomas Cochrane was a general manager. Wallace Reid was one of the company's directors.

Mary Pickford was one of its actresses. She left for Biograph in 1912. Donald Crisp directed several Majestic films.

== Filmography ==
- The Courting of Mary (1911)
- Love Heeds Not the Showers (1911)
- Little Red Riding Hood (1911)
- The Caddy's Dream (1911)
- Honor Thy Father (1912)
- The Pajama Parade (1913)
- The Second Mrs. Roebuck (1914)
- A Mother's Influence (1914)
- The Niggard (1914)
- Moonshine Molly (1914)
- Little Country Mouse (1914), extant
- The Intruder (1914)
- For Her Father's Sins (1914)
- For Those Unborn (1914)
- The City Beautiful (1914)
- Arms and the Gringo (1914)
- Another Chance (1914)
- The Old Fisherman's Story (1914)
- At Dawn (1914), directed by Donald Crisp
- Her Shattered Idol (1915)
