= John B. O'Brien =

American actor

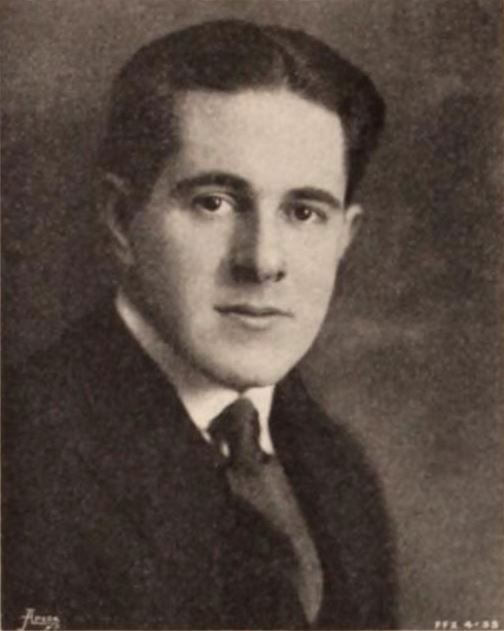
- O'Brien in 1920
- Born: December 13, 1884; Roanoke, Virginia, US
- Died: August 15, 1936 (aged 51); Los Angeles, California, US
- Years active: 1909–1936

John B. "Jack" O'Brien (December 13, 1884 – August 15, 1936) was an American actor and film director of the silent era. He appeared in more than 80 films between 1909 and 1936. He also directed 53 films between 1914 and 1926.

== Biography ==
O'Brien was born in Roanoke, Virginia. He attended St. John's College in Brooklyn, New York, and was planning on becoming a lawyer. However, Daniel Frohman persuaded him to change his mind and try a stage career instead.

He performed as a juvenile lead for the Augustus Thomas Company, beginning with the play Alabama, and later for Essanay Studios. He also worked as a cameraman for Broncho Billy Anderson and wrote scenarios for Essanay.

According to two sources, in July 1911, O'Brien was lured away from Essanay to direct the film The Life of Buffalo Bill, featuring Buffalo Bill himself. According to one of these sources, the book Buffalo Bill on the Silver Screen: The Films of William F. Cody, O'Brien had to shoot the film while the Wild West show was on tour. It was supposedly the first or one of the first five-reel feature movies. However, the opening credits of the film itself state that it is only three reels long. (To confuse the issue even further, there is another 1912 film with exactly the same title, directed by Paul Panzer.)

Some sources state he worked on D. W. Griffith's ground-breaking epic The Birth of a Nation. He directed for Famous Players and later Metro Pictures.

He died in Hollywood, California. He was survived by his wife.

== Partial filmography ==
As actor

- Across the Plains (1911 short)
- Alkali Ike's Auto (1911 short)
- Bab's Diary (1917)
- Bride 13 (1920)
- The Stealers (1920)
- Thunder Island (1921)
- Why Girls Leave Home (1921)
- A Daughter of the Law (1921)
- Molly O (1921) (uncredited)
- Annabelle Lee (1921)
- The Bride's Play (1922)
- The Black Bag (1922)
- The Noon Whistle (1923 short)
- The Soilers (1923 short)
- Postage Due (1924 short)
- Zeb vs. Paprika (1924 short)
- Brothers Under the Chin (1924 short)
- Wide Open Spaces (1924 short) (uncredited)
- The Iron Horse (1924) (uncredited)
- The Galloping Jinx (1925)
- The Desert Demon (1925)
- Once in a Lifetime (1925)
- Action Galore (1925)
- A Streak of Luck (1925)
- Noisy Noises (1929 short)
- Cat, Dog & Co. (1929 short) (uncredited)
- Saturday's Lesson (1929 Our Gang short)

As director

- The Body in the Trunk (1914 short)
- The Angel of Contention (1914 short)
- The Second Mrs. Roebuck (1914 short)
- Sierra Jim's Reformation (1914 short)
- For Her Father's Sins (1914 short)
- The Tear That Burned (1914 short)
- The Folly of Anne (1914 short)
- The Old Maid (1914 short)
- The Old Fisherman's Story (1914 short)
- Captain Macklin (1915 short)
- The Foundling (1916)
- The Flying Torpedo (1916)
- Hulda from Holland (1916)
- The Eternal Grind (1916)
- Destiny's Toy (1916)
- The Big Sister (1916)
- Mary Lawson's Secret (1917)
- Souls Triumphant (1917)
- Maternity (1917)
- Reputation (1917)
- The Unforeseen (1917)
- Queen X (1917)
- The Bishop's Emeralds (1919)
- The Family Closet (1921)
- Those Who Dare (1924)
- Montana of the Range (1926 short)
- Queen of the Hills (1926 short)
- Mountain Molly O' (1926 short)
- Outlaw Love (1926 short)
- The Little Warrior (1926 short)
- Jim Hood's Ghost (1926 short)
