= A Man's Country =

1919 film

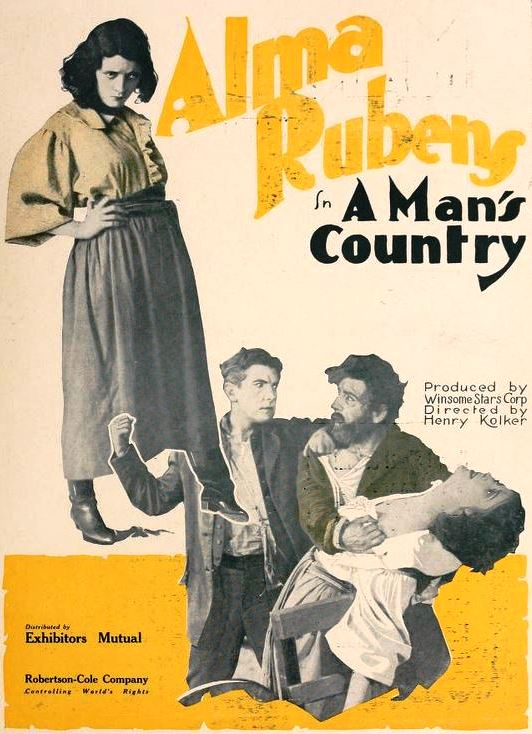
- Film advertisement
- Directed by: Henry Kolker
- Written by: Richard Schayer (scenario); John Lynch (original screen story)
- Produced by: Winsome Stars Corporation
- Starring: Alma Rubens; Alan Roscoe; Lon Chaney
- Cinematography: Robert Newhard
- Production company: Winsome Stars Corporation
- Distributed by: Exhibitors Mutual; Robertson-Cole Distributing Corporation
- Release date: July 13, 1919
- Running time: 5 reels (50 minutes)
- Country: United States
- Languages: Silent; English intertitles

A Man's Country is a 1919 silent Western drama film directed by Henry Kolker, and starring Alma Rubens, Alan Roscoe, and Lon Chaney. It was written by Richard Schayer based on a screen story by John Lynch. The poster's tagline was "A forceful and spectacular drama of the primitive West in the days of the Gold Rush, when men fought hard, women lived fast and human life was cheap."

The film was considered a lost film for decades. A small fragment was discovered at the Danish Film Institute film archive in Denmark. The fragment does not contain any Chaney footage at all, however. Richard Schayer later went on to write the screenplay for Chaney's 1926 Tell It to the Marines.

== Plot ==
Kate Carewe, the dance hall favorite of a western community of the early 1850s, is denounced for her evil ways by Ralph Bowen, a minister recently arrived from the Eastern United States. She leads a band of her worshipers to his church on the first night of his services, shooting up the place and dispersing the congregation. She returns to her element and the preacher continues to do what good work he can under the circumstances in the community.

Three Card Duncan kills the dance hall's owner Oliver Kemp, and then proceeds to kill Kemp's business partner as well. Kate plays a winner-takes-all poker game with the murderer for possession of the place. She wins and becomes the sole owner of the saloon. When a plague drives most of the residents of the town into the hills, Kate, the preacher, and three children take refuge inside the dance hall building. As time goes on, she and the preacher both see the narrowness of their views and they fall in love with each other.

Three Card Duncan returns and, finding Kate alone, seeks revenge on her for beating him at cards. The preacher fights Duncan to protect Kate. The timely arrival of Marshall Leland saves the preacher's life and, with the plague abated, Kate gives up the dance hall life, and she and the preacher are married.

== Cast ==
- Alma Rubens as Kate Carewe
- Alan Roscoe as Preacher Ralph Bowen (billed as Albert Roscoe)
- Lon Chaney as 'Three Card' Duncan
- Joseph J. Dowling as Marshall Leland (billed as Joseph Dowling)
- Edna Mae Wilson as Ruth Kemp
- Alfred Hollingsworth as Oliver Kemp
- Phil Gastrock as Connell

== Reception ==
"Alma Rubens is seen in the stellar role and the story closely follows the rules laid down for western drama ... Lon Chaney is a brutal villain." —Exhibitor's Trade Review

"There is not a great deal of merit in the Robertson-Cole production, A MAN'S COUNTRY, if viewed from the critic's corner. It belongs to the school of melodrama, the kind that is loved by the ordinary throng; but the reins of production have not been governed by skilled hands ... Alma Rubens' work (as Kate) is the saving grace of the production." —Moving Picture World

"Except for an occasional indulgence of heroics, Miss Rubens and her players are excellent. The picture is rich in locations and atmosphere and action, and should appeal through its glamour of '49. Especially noticeable is the fine acting of Lon Chaney in the character of the bad man." —Motion Picture News
