= Sold for Marriage =

1916 film

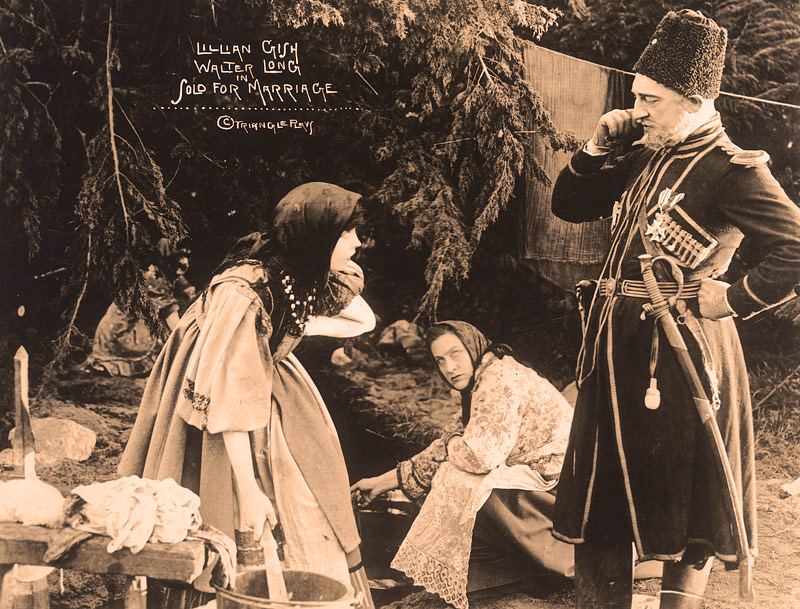
- Still with Lillian Gish, Pearl Elmore, and Walter Long
- Directed by: Christy Cabanne
- Written by: William E. Wing
- Starring: Lillian Gish
- Cinematography: William Fildew
- Distributed by: Triangle Film Corporation
- Release date: April 16, 1916
- Running time: 50 minutes
- Country: United States
- Language: Silent (English intertitles)

Sold for Marriage (1916)

Sold for Marriage is a 1916 American drama film directed by Christy Cabanne for Triangle Film Corporation. Its working title was Marja of the Steppes. The plot concerns a beautiful young Russian village girl who is in love with a young but poor boy but whose guardian wants her to marry a rich old man that she does not love. When she refuses, her uncle arranges for her to be sold for marriage in America. An extant film, a copy is preserved at the Library of Congress.

== Cast ==
- Lillian Gish as Marfa
- Frank Bennett as Jan
- Walter Long as Col. Gregioff
- Allan Sears as Ivan (as A.D. Sears)
- Pearl Elmore as Anna
- Curt Rehfeld as Dimitri (as Curt Rehfelt)
- William Lowery as George (as William E. Lowery)
- Fred Burns as A Policeman
- Mike Siebert as The Undesirable Suitor
- Frank Brownlee as Nicholas
