= Home, Sweet Home (1914 film) =

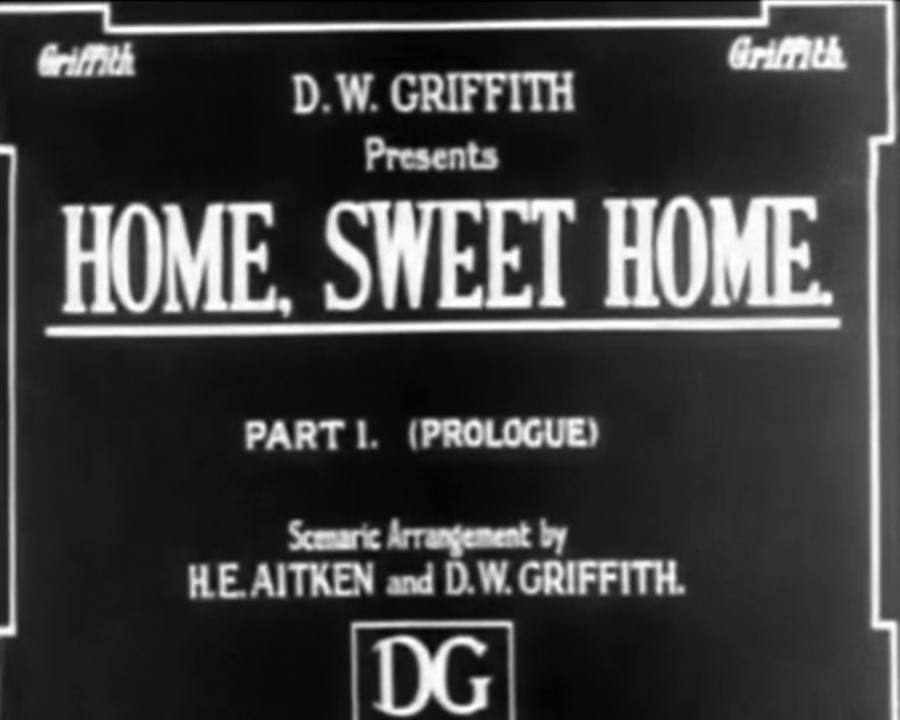
- Title card
- Directed by: D. W. Griffith
- Written by: Harry Aitken; D. W. Griffith
- Starring: Earle Foxe; Henry Walthall; Dorothy Gish; Lillian Gish
- Cinematography: G. W. Bitzer
- Edited by: James Smith; Rose Smith
- Distributed by: Mutual Film
- Release date: May 17, 1914
- Running time: 55 minutes
- Country: United States
- Language: Silent (English intertitles)

Home, Sweet Home is a 1914 American silent biographical drama directed by D. W. Griffith. It stars Earle Foxe, Henry Walthall, and Dorothy Gish.

A scene from the film featuring a violinist

== Plot ==
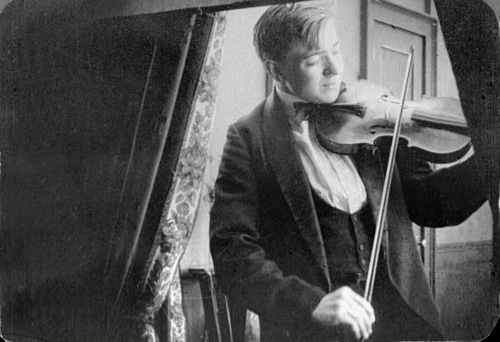
A still from Home, Sweet Home (1914)

John Howard Payne leaves home and begins a career in the theater. Despite encouragement from his mother and girlfriend, Payne begins to lead a dissolute life that leads to ruin and depression. In deep despair, he thinks of better days, and writes a song, Home! Sweet Home!, that later inspires several others in their own times of need.

== Cast ==
- Henry B. Walthall as John Howard Payne
- Josephine Crowell as Payne's mother
- Lillian Gish as Payne's sweetheart
- Dorothy Gish as the sister of Payne's sweetheart
- Fay Tincher as the worldly woman
- Mae Marsh as Apple Pie Mary
- Spottiswoode Aitken as Mary's father
- Robert Harron as the easterner, Robert Winthrop
- Miriam Cooper as the fiancée
- Mary Alden as the mother
- Donald Crisp as the mother's son
- Earle Foxe
- James Kirkwood as the mother's son
- Jack Pickford as the mother's son
- Fred Burns as the sheriff
- Courtenay Foote as the husband
- Blanche Sweet as the wife
