= Tess of the d'Urbervilles (1924 film) =

1924 film by Marshall Neilan

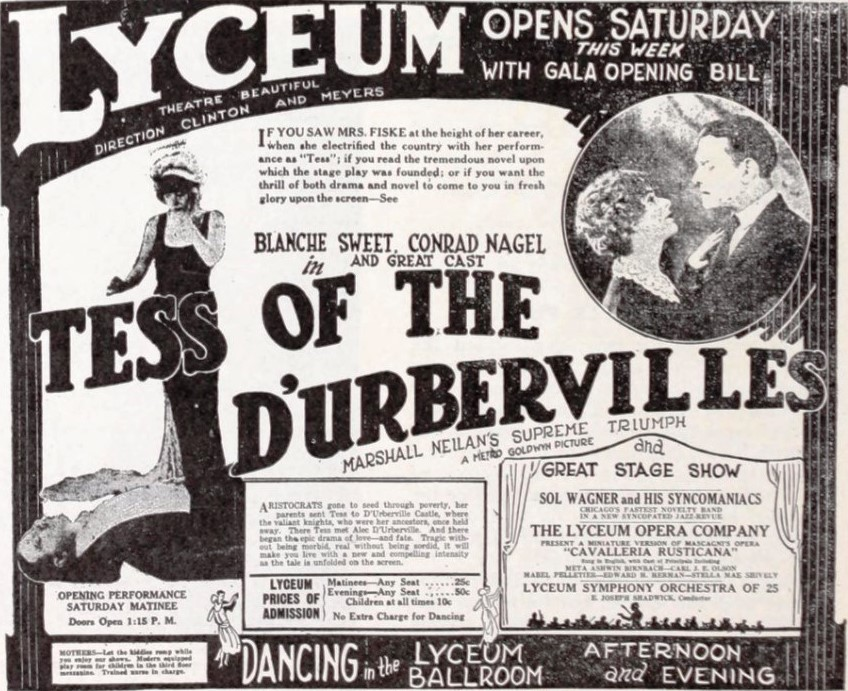
- Newspaper advertisement
- Directed by: Marshall Neilan
- Written by: Dorothy Farnum
- Based on: Tess of the d'Urbervilles by Thomas Hardy
- Produced by: Louis B. Mayer
- Starring: Blanche Sweet; Conrad Nagel; Stuart Holmes
- Cinematography: David Kesson
- Distributed by: Metro-Goldwyn
- Release date: August 11, 1924
- Running time: 80 minutes
- Country: United States
- Language: Silent (English intertitles)

Tess of the d'Urbervilles is a 1924 American silent drama film starring Blanche Sweet and Conrad Nagel. It was directed by Sweet's husband, Marshall Neilan. The film is the second motion picture adaptation of the 1891 novel by Thomas Hardy, which had been turned into a very successful 1897 play starring Mrs. Fiske. In 1913, Adolph Zukor enticed Mrs. Fiske to reprise her role in a film version which is now considered lost. The 1924 version is also considered lost.

== Plot ==
A young servant girl is seduced and raped by an older middle class man in Victorian England when employed in his household. After moving on with her path, she gets married. All is well until her husband discovers her past. This fact prompts her on a life of wandering, murder, and execution.

== Cast ==
- Blanche Sweet as Teresa "Tess" Durbeyfield
- Conrad Nagel as Angel Clare
- Stuart Holmes as Alexander "Alec" D'Urberville
- George Fawcett as John Durbeyfield
- Victory Bateman as Joan Durbeyfield
- Courtenay Foote as Richard Crick
- Joseph J. Dowling as The Parson
- Billy Butts as Little Boy (uncredited)
- George Hickman as Undetermined Secondary Role (uncredited)
- Babe London as Undetermined Secondary Role (uncredited)
- Jane Mercer as Undetermined Secondary Role (uncredited)

== Production ==
After the film was completed, Louis B. Mayer changed the tragic ending to a happy one, much to the annoyance of Neilan and Hardy.

== Preservation ==
With no prints of Tess of the d'Urbervilles located in any film archives, it is a lost film.

== See also ==
- Blanche Sweet filmography
- Tess of the d'Urbervilles (1913)
- Tess (1979)
- Tess of the D'Urbervilles (2008)
- List of lost films
