= The Hunchback (1914 film) =

1914 American silent short drama film

- Directed by: W. Christy Cabanne
- Written by: Anita Loos
- Starring: Frank Turner; Lillian Gish; William Garwood
- Distributed by: Mutual Film Corporation (USA, theatrical)
- Release date: April 12, 1914
- Running time: 20 minutes (2 reels)
- Country: United States
- Language: silent film (english intertitles)

The Hunchback is a 1914 American silent short drama film directed by W. Christy Cabanne and written by Anita Loos.

The film stars William Garwood, Frank Turner, Edna Mae Wilson and Lillian Gish.

== Cast ==
- Frank Turner - a hunchback peddler
- Lillian Gish - a young orphan
- William Garwood - a young prospector
- Edna Mae Wilson
- Tom Haverly
