= Spottiswoode Aitken =

Scottish-American actor (1868-1933)

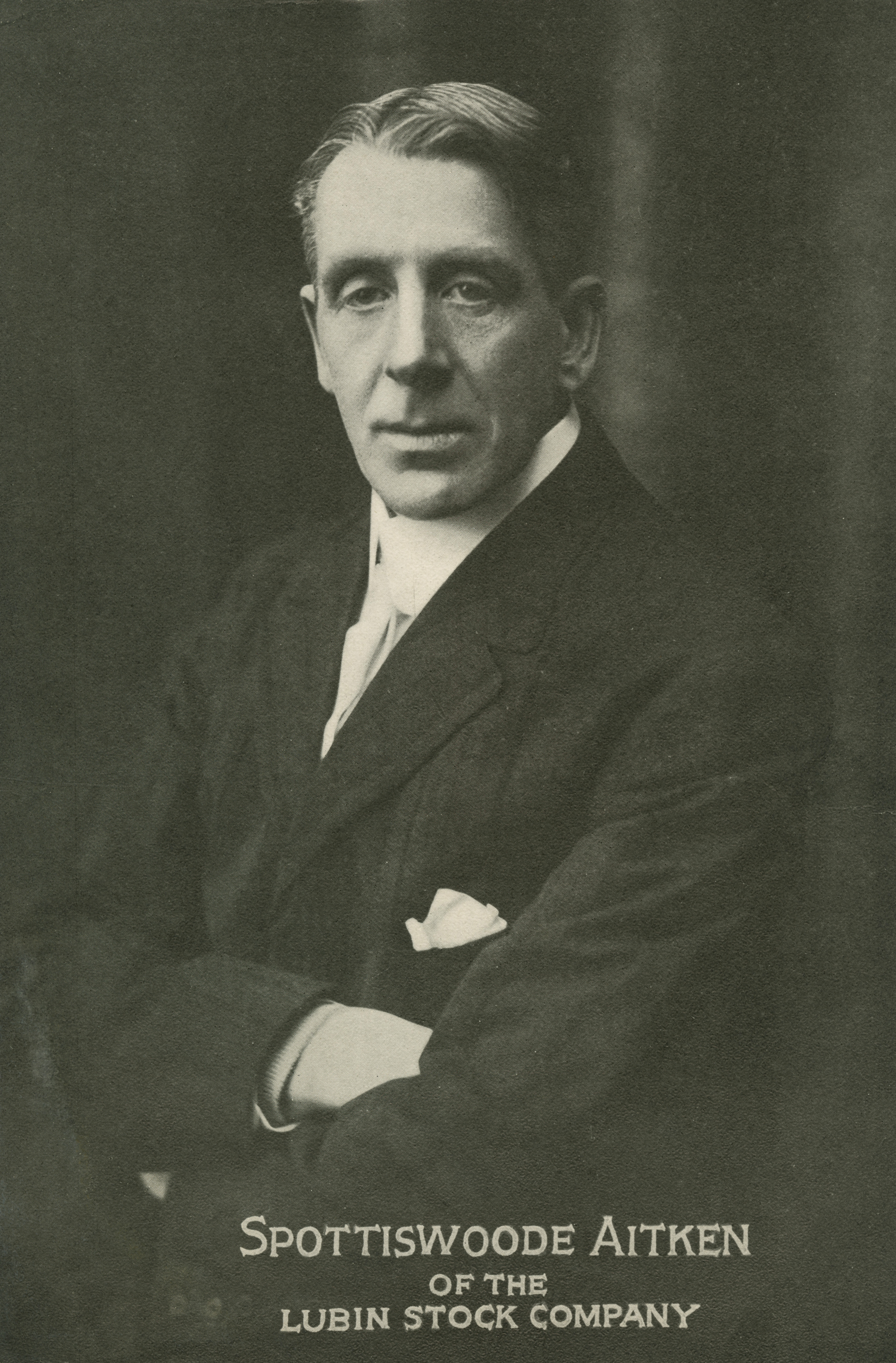
- Spottiswoode Aitken, ca. 1915
- Born: Frank Spottiswoode Aitken; 16 April 1868; Edinburgh, Scotland, United Kingdom
- Died: 26 February 1933 (aged 64); Los Angeles, California, U.S.
- Occupation: Actor
- Years active: 1910–1928
- Spouse: Marion Dana Jones (divorced 1922)
- Children: 3

Frank Spottiswoode Aitken (16 April 1868 – 26 February 1933) was a Scottish-American actor of the silent era. He played Dr. Cameron in D. W. Griffith's epic drama The Birth of a Nation.

== Early years ==
Aitken was born 16 April 1868 in Edinburgh, Scotland.

== Acting ==
In his book, The King of the Movies: Film Pioneer Siegmund Lubin, Joseph P. Eckhardt wrote that Aitken was "trained as a Shakespearean actor, with many years of experience under his belt." His film debut came in 1911. He eventually appeared in 81 feature films between 1914 and 1927.

== Businessman ==
Aitken was one of the first actors to settle in Los Angeles when the film industry was still at its strongest in New York. He invested most of his earnings in real estate, buying up orange groves around what would become Hollywood.

== Personal life ==
Aitken was involved in a controversy in 1922 when, after suing his wife Marion Dana Jones for divorce for alleged infidelity, she countersued. A United Press news story reported that she was "alleging her husband had coerced her into living with Hay Weinstein, wealthy Santa Barbaran, so that he could extort money from Weinstein."

The couple had three children: Francis Spottiswoode Aitken Jr., Frances Aitken and Margaret Shirley Aitken.

== Death ==
Aitken died 26 February 1933 in Los Angeles, California. He was 64 years old. He is buried in the Hollywood Forever Cemetery.

== Partial filmography ==
- The Battle (1911, Short) - Minor Role
- The Sands of Dee (1912, Short)
- The Green-Eyed Devil (1914, Short)
- Home, Sweet Home (1914) - James Smith - Mary's Father
- The Girl in the Shack (1914, Short) - Jenny's Father - the Sheriff
- The Angel of Contention (1914, Short) - Nettie's Father
- The Avenging Conscience (1914) - The Uncle
- The Old Fisherman's Story (1914) - Old Fisherman
- The Birth of a Nation (1915) - Dr. Cameron
- The Outcast (1915) - The Lawyer
- The Outlaw's Revenge (1915) - The Soothsayer
- Captain Macklin (1915, Short) - General Laquerre
- Her Shattered Idol (1915) - Colonel Nutt - Mae's Uncle
- The Price of Power (1916) - Gabriel Brooks - Maisie's Father
- Acquitted (1916) - Charles Ryder
- The Flying Torpedo (1916) - Bartholomew Thompson
- Macbeth (1916) - Duncan
- An Innocent Magdalene (1916) - Col. Raleigh
- Intolerance (1916) - Brown Eyes's Father
- The Old Folks at Home (1916) - Judge
- The Wharf Rat (1916) - Carl Wagner
- The Americano (1916) - Presidente Hernando de Valdez
- Pathways of Life (1916, Short) - Daddy Wisdom
- Stage Struck (1917) - The Judge
- A Woman's Awakening (1917) - Judge Cotter
- Cheerful Givers (1917) - Rev. John Deady
- Souls Triumphant (1917) - Josiah Vale
- Melissa of the Hills (1917) - Jethro Stark
- Charity Castle (1917) - Lucius Garrett
- Her Country's Call (1917) - Dr. Downie
- Southern Pride (1917) - Father Mort
- A Game of Wits (1917) - Silas Stone
- Beauty and the Rogue (1918) - Benjamin Wilson
- The Mating of Marcella (1918) - Jose Duranzo
- How Could You Jean? (1918) - Rufus Bonner
- In Judgement Of (1918) - Mr. Manners
- The Cruise of the Make-Believes (1918) - Simon Quarle
- Jane Goes A-Wooing (1919) - David Lyman
- The Secret Garden (1919) - Archibald Craven
- Who Cares? (1919) - Mr. Ludlow
- Fighting Through (1919) - Col. DuBrey Carter
- The Wicked Darling (1919) - Fadem
- Captain Kidd, Jr. (1919) - Augus MacTavish
- The White Heather (1919) - James Hume
- Caleb Piper's Girl (1919) - Caleb Piper
- An Innocent Adventuress (1919) - Meekton
- Hay Foot, Straw Foot (1919) - Thaddeus Briggs
- Evangeline (1919) - Benedict Bellefontaine
- Rough Riding Romance (1919) - The King
- The Broken Commandments (1919) - Mr. Banard
- Her Kingdom of Dreams (1919) - David Rutledge
- Bonnie Bonnie Lassie (1919) - Jeremiah Wishart
- The Thunderbolt (1919) - Allan Pomeroy
- A Woman of Pleasure (1919) - Wilberforce Pace
- Witch's Gold (1920)
- The White Circle (1920) - Bernard Huddlestone
- Nomads of the North (1920) - Old Roland
- Dangerous Love (1920) - The Father
- The Unknown Wife (1921) - Henry Wilburton
- Reputation (1921) - Karl
- At the End of the World (1921)
- Beyond (1921) - Rufus Southerne
- The Man of Courage (1922) - Stephen Gregory
- The Trap (1922) - The Factor
- Monte Cristo (1922) - Abbé Faria
- The Snowshoe Trail (1922) - John Lounsbury
- Manslaughter (1922) - Member of the Jury (uncredited)
- The Young Rajah (1922) - Caleb
- One Wonderful Night (1922) - Minister
- A Dangerous Game (1922) - Edward Peebles
- Around the World in Eighteen Days (1923) - Piggott
- Merry-Go-Round (1923) - Minister of War / Gisella's Father
- Six Days (1923) - Pere Jerome
- The Love Pirate (1923) - Cyrus Revere
- Pioneer's Gold (1924) - Bob Hartley
- Triumph (1924) - Torrini
- Lure of the Yukon (1924) - Sourdough McCraig
- The Fire Patrol (1924) - Captain John Ferguson
- Gerald Cranston's Lady (1924) - Ephraim Brewster
- Those Who Dare (1924) - Thorne Wtherell
- The Coast Patrol (1925) - Capt. Slocum
- The Handicap (1925) - Henrietta's Grandfather
- The Goose Woman (1925) - Jacob Rigg
- The Eagle (1925) - Dubrovsky's Father (uncredited)
- Accused (1925) - Eagle Eye
- The Power of the Weak (1926) - The Father
- The Two-Gun Man (1926) - Dad Randall
- Roaring Fires (1927) - Calvert Carter
- The Power of the Press (1928) - Sports Writer (final film role)
