= Edward Morrissey (director) =

American director

Edward Morrissey was a college professor who became a stage actor and then a film director. He taught French and German at the University of California, then became an actor in Shubert productions before assisting D.W. Griffith at Biograph and then directing his own films at Thanhouser.

== Filmography ==
- The Girl in the Shack (1914), short film
- The House Built Upon Sand (1916)
- Stage Struck (1917)
- The Pointing Finger (1919) with Edward A. Kull also directing
- Just Off Broadway (1920)
