= Mary Alden =

American actress (1883–1946)

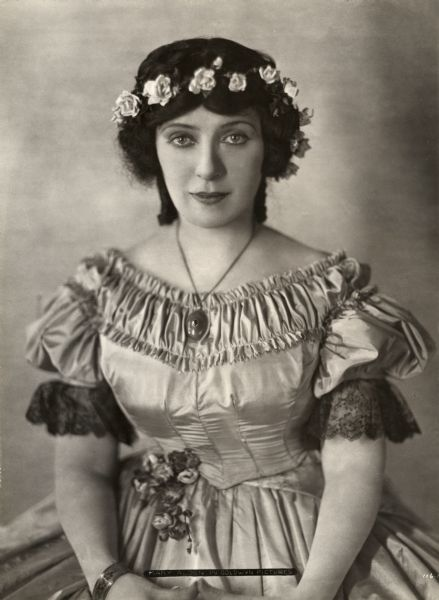
- Alden in Milestones (1920)
- Born: Mary Maguire Alden; June 18, 1883; New York City, New York, U.S.
- Died: July 2, 1946 (aged 63); Woodland Hills, Los Angeles, California, U.S.
- Resting place: Valhalla Memorial Park Cemetery
- Occupation: Actress
- Years active: 1913–1937

Mary Maguire Alden (June 18, 1883 – July 2, 1946) was an American motion picture and stage actress. She was one of the first Broadway actresses to work in Hollywood.

== Life ==
Alden was born in New York City on June 18, 1883. She performed on Broadway in Personal (1907) and The Rule of Three (1914). She worked for the Biograph Company and Pathé Exchange in the first portion of her career. Her most popular role in movies came in The Birth of a Nation directed by D.W. Griffith in 1915. Alden played the role of a mulatto woman in love with a northern politician. The following year she was in Griffith's Intolerance with Mae Marsh, Miriam Cooper, and Vera Lewis. After making Less Than The Dust with Mary Pickford in 1917, she took a temporary leave from motion pictures, acting for a while on the stage. Critics acclaimed Alden's portrayal of the mother, Mrs. Anthon, in The Old Nest (1921) and her characterization of an old lady in The Man With Two Mothers (1922). The latter feature was produced by Sam Goldwyn.

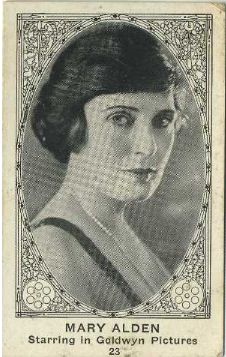
Movie card distributed in 1922 to promote Goldwyn Pictures

Alden was a prolific motion picture actress throughout the 1920s and into the early 1930s. A sampling of movies in which she had roles are The Plastic Age (1925), The Joy Girl (1927), Ladies of the Mob (1928), and Port of Dreams (1929). The final films she received screen credit for are Hell's House, Rasputin and the Empress, and Strange Interlude, each from 1932.

Alden died at the Motion Picture & Television Country House and Hospital in Woodland Hills, Los Angeles, California in 1946, aged 63 years. This had been her residence for the last four years of her life. Alden was interred in an unmarked grave under her married name of Deangman in Valhalla Memorial Park Cemetery in North Hollywood, California.

== Selected filmography ==
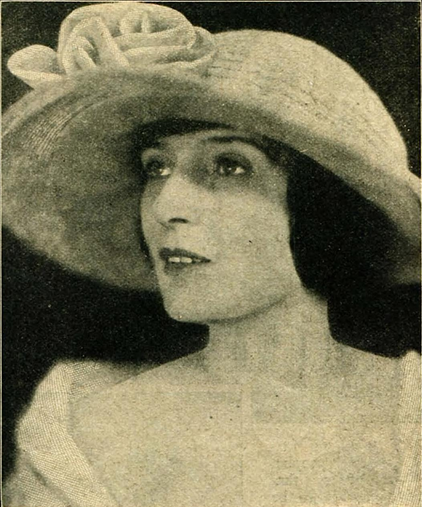
Alden in Picture-Play Magazine (1923)

- The Battle of the Sexes (1914) as Mrs. Frank Andrews
- Home, Sweet Home (1914) as The Mother
- The Old Fisherman's Story (1914) as The Gypsy
- The Birth of a Nation (1915) as Lydia Brown, Stoneman's Housekeeper
- The Slave Girl (1915, Short) as Sally, a Yellow Girl
- The Outcast (1915) as The Girl's Mother
- A Man's Prerogative (1915) as Elizabeth Towne
- Ghosts (1915) as Helen Arling
- The Lily and the Rose (1915) as Mrs. Fairfax
- Acquitted (1916) as Mrs. Carter
- The Good Bad-Man (1916) as Jane Stuart
- Macbeth (1916) as Lady Macduff
- An Innocent Magdalene (1916) as The Woman
- Hell-to-Pay Austin (1916) as Doris Valentine
- Pillars of Society (1916) as Lona Tonnesen
- The Narrow Path (1916) as Shirley Martin
- Intolerance (1916) as Uplifter #1
- Less Than the Dust (1916) as Mrs. Bradshaw
- The Argyle Case (1917) as Nellie Marsh
- The Land of Promise (1917) as Gertie Marsh
- The Naulahka (1918) as Prince's Mother
- The Narrow Path (1918) as Margaret Dunn
- Common Clay (1919) as Mrs. Neal
- The Unpardonable Sin (1919) as Mrs. Parcot
- The Mother and the Law (1919) as An Uplifter
- The Broken Butterfly (1919) as Zabie Elliot
- Erstwhile Susan (1919) as Erstwhile Susan
- The Inferior Sex (1920) as Clarissa Mott-Smith
- Parted Curtains (1920) as Mrs. Masters
- Miss Nobody (1920) as Jason's Wife
- Milestones (1920) as Rose Sibley
- Honest Hutch (1920) as Mrs. Hutchins
- Silk Husbands and Calico Wives (1920) as Edith Beecher Kendall
- Trust Your Wife (1921)
- The Witching Hour (1921) as Helen Whipple
- Snowblind (1921) as Bella
- The Old Nest (1921) as Mrs. Anthon
- Man with Two Mothers (1922) as Widow O'Neill
- The Hidden Woman (1922) as Mrs. Randolph
- A Woman's Woman (1922) as Densie Plummer
- Notoriety (1922) as Ann Boland
- The Bond Boy (1922) as Mrs. Newboat
- Has the World Gone Mad! (1923) as Mrs. Bell
- The Tents of Allah (1923) as Oulaid
- The Empty Cradle (1923) as Alice Larkin
- The Steadfast Heart (1923) as Mrs. Burke
- The Eagle's Feather (1923) as Delia Jamiesoon
- Pleasure Mad (1923) as Marjorie Benton
- Painted People (1924) as Mrs. Bryne
- A Fool's Awakening (1924) as Myra
- When a Girl Loves (1924) as The Czarina
- Babbitt (1924) as Mrs. Myra Babbitt
- The Beloved Brute (1924) as Augustina
- Siege (1925) as Aunt Augusta Ruyland
- Faint Perfume (1925) as Ma Crumb
- The Happy Warrior (1925) as Aunt Maggie
- Under the Rouge (1925) as Martha Maynard
- The Unwritten Law (1925) as Miss Grant
- Soiled (1925) as Mrs. Brown
- The Plastic Age (1925) as Mrs. Carver
- The Earth Woman (1926) as Martha Tilden (The Earth Woman)
- Brown of Harvard (1926) as Mrs. Brown
- Lovey Mary (1926) as Mrs. Wiggs
- April Fool (1926) as Amelia Rosen
- The Potters (1927) as Ma Potter
- The Joy Girl (1927) as Mrs. Courage
- Twin Flappers (1927)
- Fools for Luck (1928) as Mrs. Hunter
- Ladies of the Mob (1928) as Soft Annie
- The Cossacks (1928) as Lukashka's Mother
- The Sawdust Paradise (1928) as Mother
- Someone to Love (1928) as Harriet Newton
- Girl Overboard (1929)
- Bad Sister (1931) as Minor Role (uncredited)
- Politics (1931) as Mrs. Mary Evans
- Hell's House (1932) as Lucy Mason (uncredited)
- When a Feller Needs a Friend (1932) as Mrs. Higgins (uncredited)
- Strange Interlude (1932) as Mary, the Leeds' maid
- Rasputin and the Empress (1932) as Natasha's Lady in Waiting (uncredited)
- One More Spring (1935) as Minor Role (uncredited)
- The Great Hotel Murder (1935) as Mrs. Harvey (uncredited)
- Gentle Julia (1936) as Aunt (uncredited)
- Legion of Terror (1936) as Accident Onlooker (uncredited)
- Career Woman (1936) as Townswoman (uncredited)
- That I May Live (1937) as Woman in Auto Camp (uncredited) (final film role)
