= Paul Powell (director) =

American film director

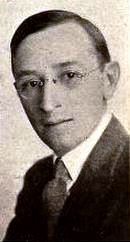
- Powell in 1922
- Born: Paul Mahlon Powell; September 6, 1881; Peoria, Illinois, U.S.
- Died: July 2, 1944 (aged 62); Pasadena, California, U.S.
- Resting place: Forest Lawn Memorial Park, Glendale
- Other name: Paul M. Powell
- Education: Bradley Polytechnic Institute
- Occupations: Journalist; director; producer; screenwriter; actor
- Years active: 1914–1930
- Spouse: Valerie Smith (m. 1903–1944)
- Children: 1

Paul Mahlon Powell (September 6, 1881 – July 2, 1944) was an American journalist, director, producer, screenwriter, and actor. Powell was most active during the silent film era and is best known for directing Mary Pickford in Pollyanna (1920).

== Early life and education ==
Born in Peoria, Illinois, Powell was one of six children of Charles Henry and Anna Clara Powell (née von Schoenheider). His father was a publisher who founded the Peoria Evening Star. Powell was educated in Peoria and later attended Bradley Polytechnic Institute. After graduation, he worked at his father's newspaper as a typesetter and editor before becoming a reporter.

In the early 1900s, Powell worked as a reporter for the Chicago Tribune and the Los Angeles Express.

== Film career ==
In 1910, Powell quit his job as a reporter to work in the film industry. The following year, he became the assistant of director and screenwriter Wilbert Melville. In 1914, D. W. Griffith hired Powell to be the director of Mutual Film Corporation films. Two years later, Griffith hired Powell to direct features for Triangle-Fine Arts Film Corporation. While working for Triangle-Fine Arts, Powell directed Mary Pickford in the film adaptation of the 1913 novel Pollyanna. The film was a tremendous success and grossed $1.1 million upon its release. Powell also supported a young Rudolph Valentino while working on films such as A Society Sensation and All Night, who later recalled "He was the first to say, 'Stick to it and you'll make a name for yourself.'" Valentino later became one of the silent era's most cherished stars.

Powell's final films in the late 1920s and 1930s were musical comedy shorts for Pathé Exchange.

== Personal life ==
Powell married Valerie Smith in 1903. The couple had a daughter, Janice.

== Death ==
Powell died in Pasadena, California, on July 2, 1944. His remains are interred at the Great Mausoleum, Columbarium of Providence at Forest Lawn Memorial Park in Glendale, California.

== Selected filmography ==
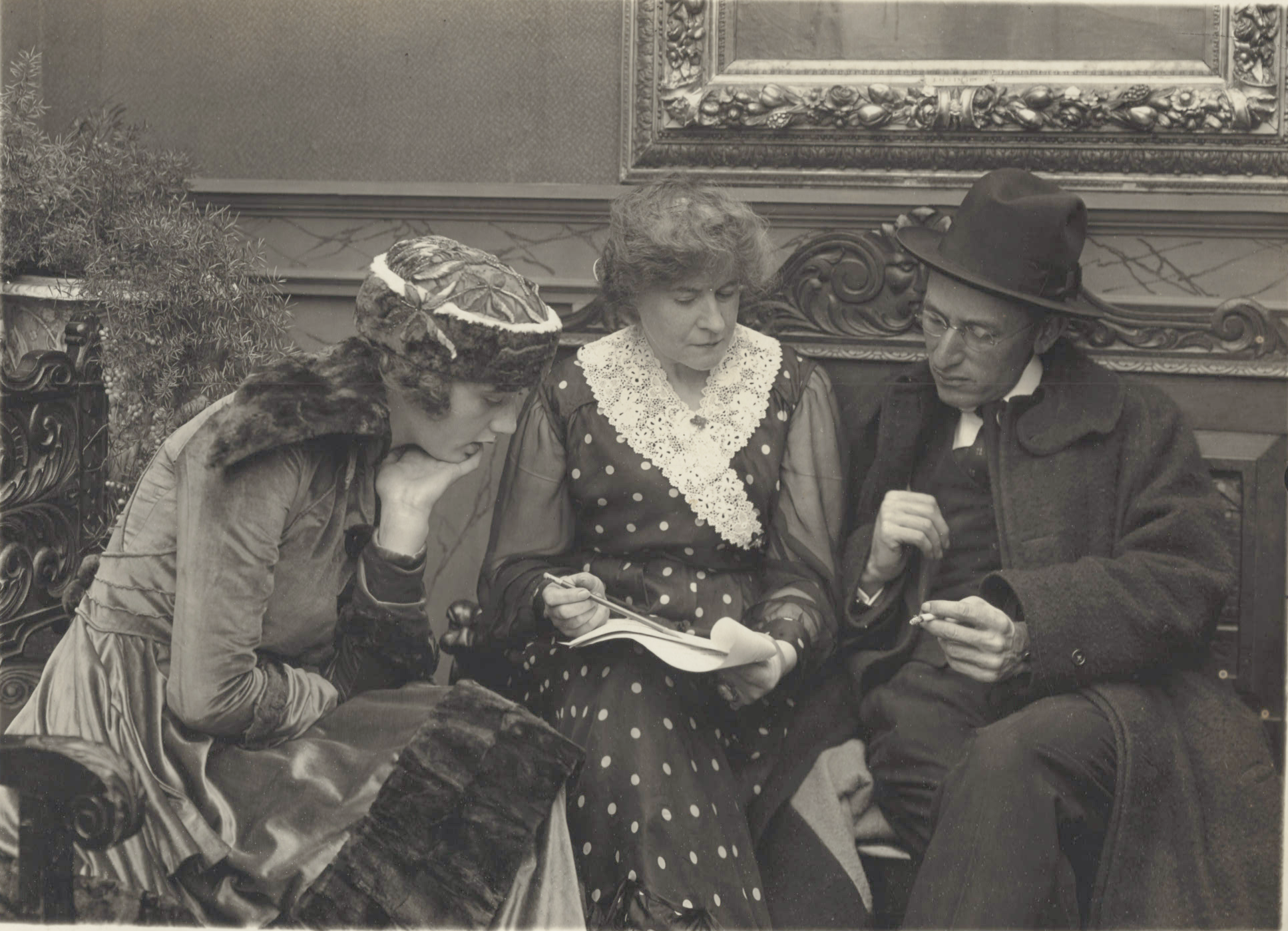
Powell (right) works with actress Constance Talmadge and writer Mary H. O'Connor on the set of A Girl of the Timber Claims

- The Lily and the Rose (1915)
- The Stool Pigeon (1915)
- Up from the Depths (1915)
- Hell-to-Pay Austin (1916)
- Betsy's Burglar (1917)
- A Girl of the Timber Claims (1917)
- All Night (1918)
- Common Property (1919)
- Pollyanna (1920)
- Sweet Lavender (1920)
- Eyes of the Heart (1920)
- Dangerous Lies (1921)
- The Mystery Road (1921)
- The Fog (1923)
- Her Market Value (1925)
- Let Women Alone (1925)
- North Star (1925)
