= The Lily and the Rose =

1915 film

- Directed by: Paul Powell
- Written by: D. W. Griffith
- Produced by: D. W. Griffith
- Starring: Lillian Gish; Wilfred Lucas; Rozsika Dolly; Loyola O'Connor; Cora Drew; Elmer Clifton; Mary Alden; William Hinckley
- Cinematography: John W. Leezer; Hugh McClung
- Distributed by: Triangle Film Corporation
- Release date: December 7, 1915
- Running time: 50 minutes
- Country: United States
- Language: Silent with English intertitles

The Lily and the Rose; sometimes Lily of the Rose is a 1915 American silent drama film directed by Paul Powell and starring Lillian Gish. Preserved at the Library of Congress (although with reel 5 reportedly missing). Composer J. A. Raynes composed theatre organ music to accompany this film.

== Cast ==
- Lillian Gish as Mary Randolph
- Wilfred Lucas as Jack Van Norman
- Rosie Dolly as Rose (as Rozsika Dolly)
- Loyola O'Connor as Letty Carrington
- Cora Drew as Molly Carrington
- Elmer Clifton as Allison Edwards
- Mary Alden
- William Hinckley
- Alberta Lee (uncredited)
- Frank Mills (uncredited)

== See also ==
- Lillian Gish filmography
