= Allan Sears =

American actor

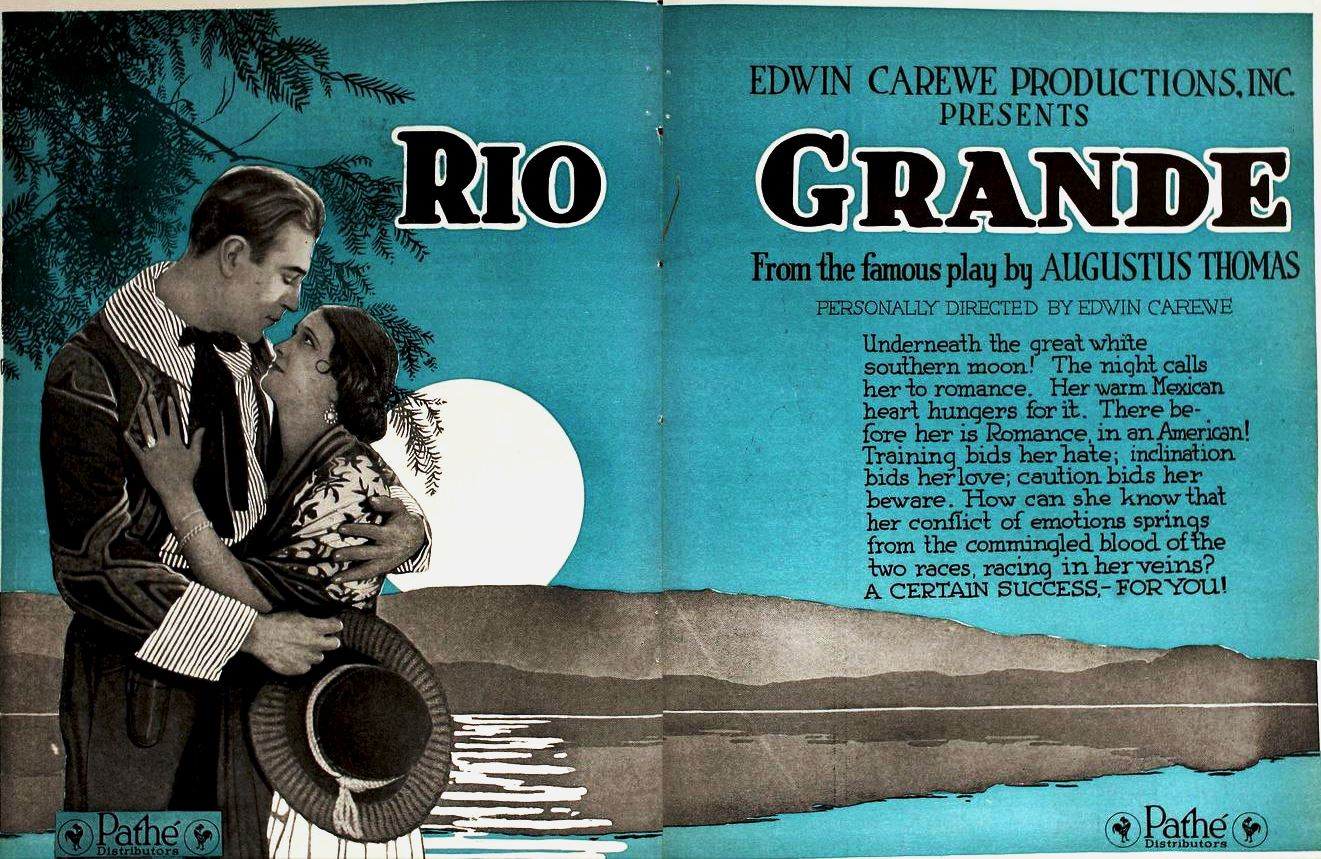
- An advertisement for Rio Grande, 1920. Sears (left) is seen with Rosemary Theby
- Born: Alfred Daniel Sears; March 9, 1887; San Antonio, Texas, U.S.
- Died: August 18, 1942 (aged 55); Los Angeles, California, U.S.
- Occupation: Actor

Allan Sears (March 9, 1887 – August 18, 1942) was an American film actor who played leading roles in the 1910s and 1920s before transitioning into character roles in the 1930s. He was noted for his tall stature.

== Biography ==
Sears was born in San Antonio, Texas, to Harry Sears and Alice Gould.

He started acting on camera around 1914, after getting his start on the stage in theater and as an opera singer. In Hollywood, appeared in a number of D. W. Griffith's films alongside actress Mary Miles Minter.

He took some time away from Hollywood to recuperate from an illness in the early 1920s, returning a few years later to play character roles.

He died in Los Angeles in 1942, and was survived by his daughter, Zaida.

== Selected filmography ==
- The Birth of a Nation (1915)
- The Absentee (1915)
- The Penitentes (1915)
- Martyrs of the Alamo (1915)
- Sold for Marriage (1916)
- Reggie Mixes In (1916)
- Hell-to-Pay Austin (1916)
- Intolerance (1916)
- Diane of the Follies (1916)
- The Children of the Feud (1916)
- A Sister of Six (1916)
- The Little Yank (1917)
- A Woman's Awakening (1917)
- The Gown of Destiny (1917)
- The Desire of the Moth (1917)
- A Girl of the Timber Claims (1917)
- The Regenerates (1917)
- Madame Bo-Peep (1917)
- The City of Purple Dreams (1918)
- The Wife He Bought (1918)
- The Kaiser, the Beast of Berlin (1918)
- Her Inspiration (1918)
- The Amateur Adventuress (1919)
- Big Little Person (1919)
- Heart o' the Hills (1919)
- Judy of Rogue's Harbor (1920)
- Rio Grande (1920)
- Long Live the King (1923)
- In Love with Love (1924)
- The Scarlet Honeymoon (1925)
- Into Her Kingdom (1926)
- The Midnight Adventure (1928)
- Name the Woman (1934)
- The Revenge Rider (1935)
- Fighting Shadows (1935)
- Justice of the Range (1935)
- The Singing Vagabond (1935)
- Sunset of Power (1936)
- For the Service (1936)
- The Boss Rider of Gun Creek (1936)
- Two-Fisted Sheriff (1937)
- Trapped (1937)
