= Might and the Man =

1917 film directed by Edward Dillon

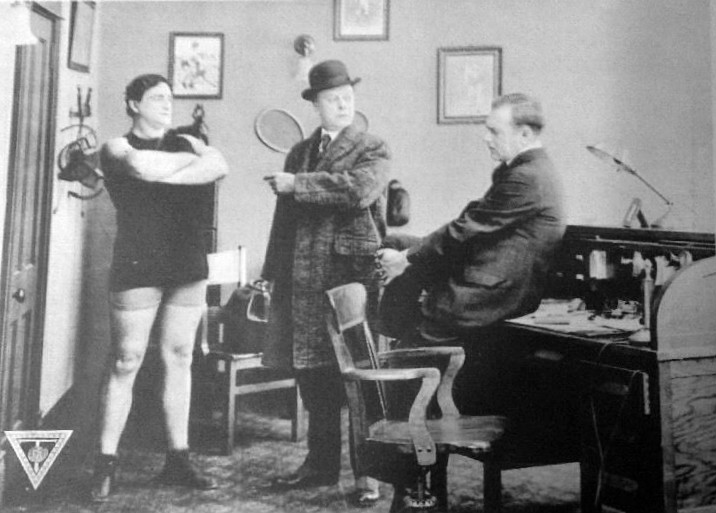
- Directed by: Edward Dillon
- Written by: F.M. Pierson
- Starring: Elmo Lincoln; Carmel Myers; Wilbur Higby
- Production company: Fine Arts Film Company
- Distributed by: Triangle Distributing
- Release date: May 6, 1917
- Running time: 50 minutes
- Country: United States
- Languages: Silent; English intertitles

Might and the Man is a 1917 American silent drama film directed by Edward Dillon and starring Elmo Lincoln, Carmel Myers and Wilbur Higby.

== Cast ==
- Elmo Lincoln as McFadden
- Carmel Myers as Winifred
- Wilbur Higby as Hiram Sloan
- Lillian Langdon as Mrs. Sloan
- Clyde E. Hopkins as Clarence Whitman
- Carl Stockdale as Billings
- Luray Huntley as Kate
- Mazie Radford as Pansy

== Bibliography ==
- Robert B. Connelly. The Silents: Silent Feature Films, 1910-36, Volume 40, Issue 2. December Press, 1998.
