= Hell-to-Pay Austin =

1916 silent film by Paul Powell

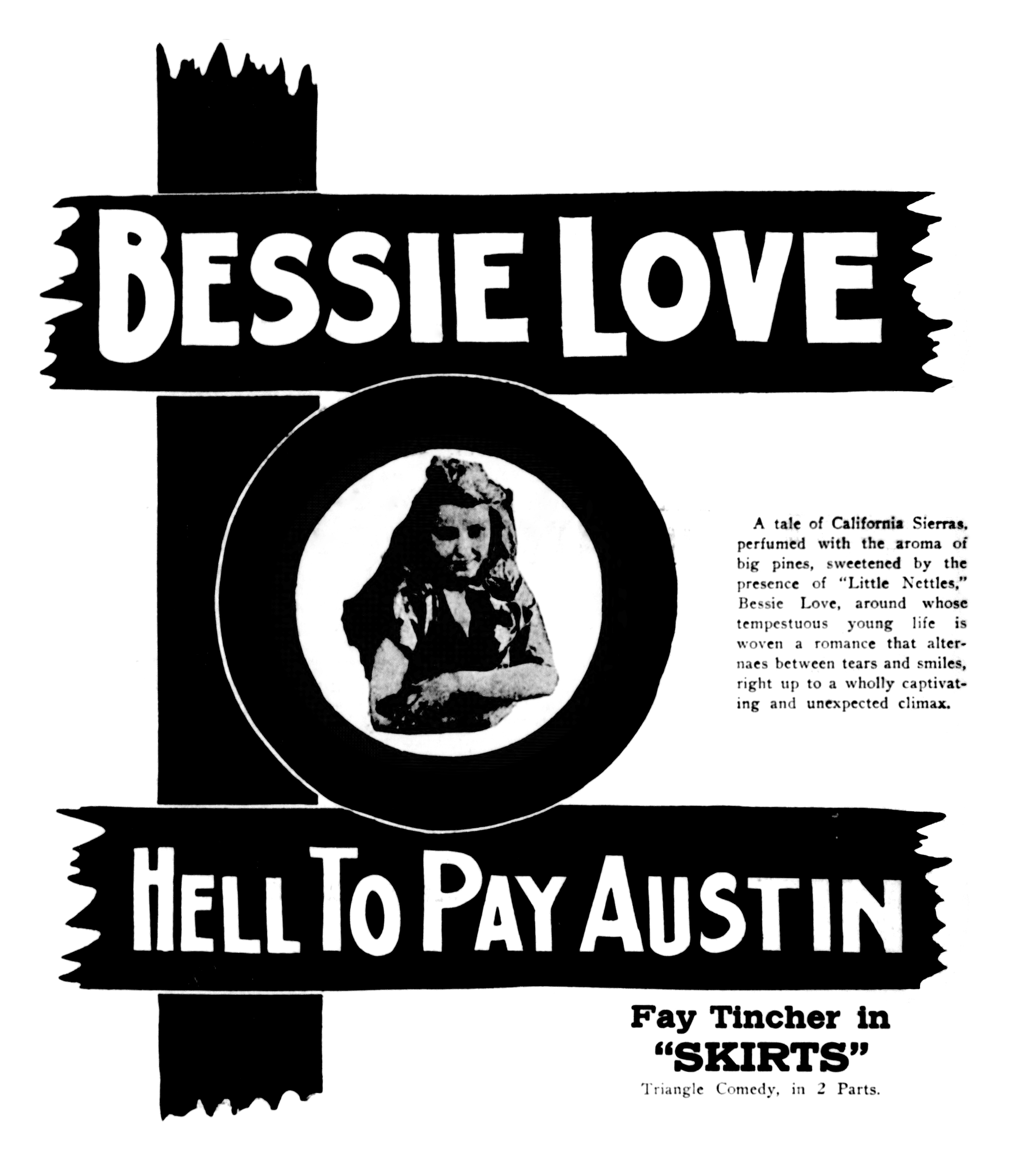
- Newspaper advertisement
- Directed by: Paul Powell
- Written by: Mary H. O'Connor
- Starring: Wilfred Lucas; Bessie Love; Eugene Pallette; Ralph Lewis; Mary Alden; Monte Blue
- Cinematography: J.W. Leezer
- Production company: Fine Arts Film Company
- Distributed by: Triangle Film Corporation
- Release date: August 20, 1916 (U.S.)
- Running time: 50 minutes; 5 reels
- Country: United States
- Language: Silent (English intertitles)

Hell-to-Pay Austin (also known, without hyphens, as Hell to Pay Austin) is a 1916 American silent comedy-drama film directed by Paul Powell and starring Wilfred Lucas in the title role, with Bessie Love, Eugene Pallette, and Mary Alden in supporting roles. Written by Mary H. O'Connor, the film was produced by D. W. Griffith's Fine Arts Film Company and distributed by Triangle Film Corporation. It is presumed lost.

== Production ==
Locations were filmed in San Diego, San Francisco, Bear Valley, Fresno, and Huntington Lake.

== Plot ==
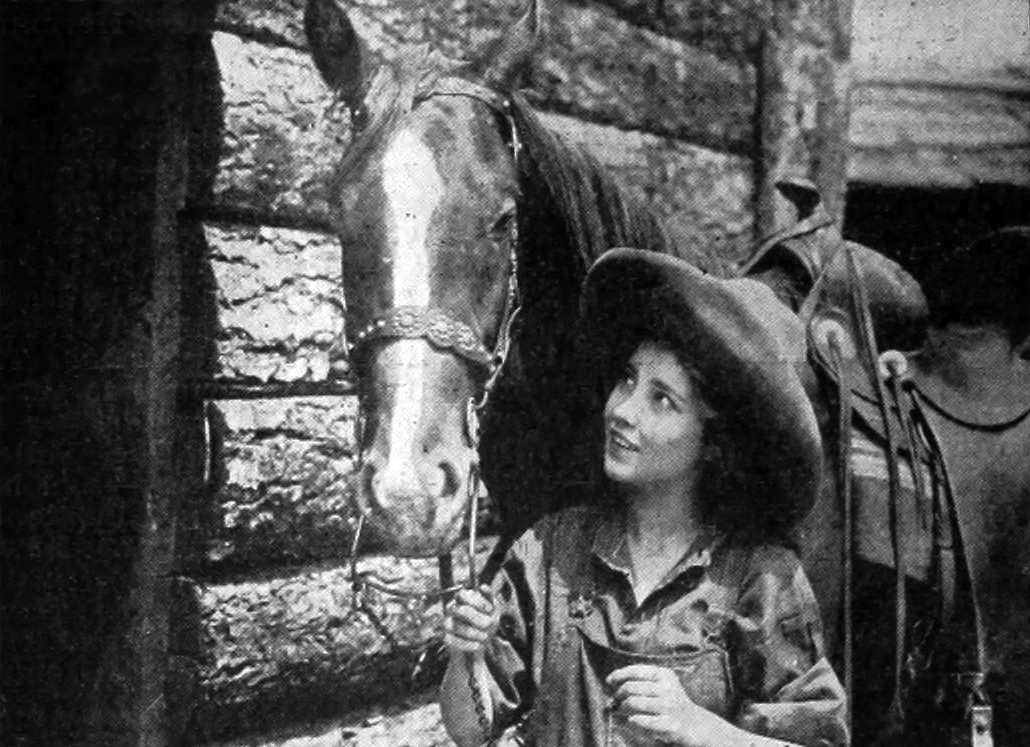
Bessie Love in a scene from the film

When a minister dies from alcoholism, his daughter Briar Rose (Love), also called "Nettles", is unofficially adopted by a team of lumberjacks, including the rough-and-tumble 'Hell-to-Pay' Austin (Lucas). Nettles is so touched by the logging camp's tribute to her father, organized by Austin, that she chooses him to be her foster father. Her innocence and purity eventually transform Austin into an upstanding Christian.

One day, an elegant woman (Alden) stumbles into the logging camp. The lumberjacks and Nettles help her, and she invites Briar Rose to visit her in New York someday. Years later, Nettles goes away to boarding school in New York. When taunted by her fellow students, Nettles leaves the school to stay with the woman she had met previously. Austin comes to New York to rescue Nettles, and, reunited, they discover that their guardian/ward relationship has evolved into one of true love and they marry.

== Cast ==
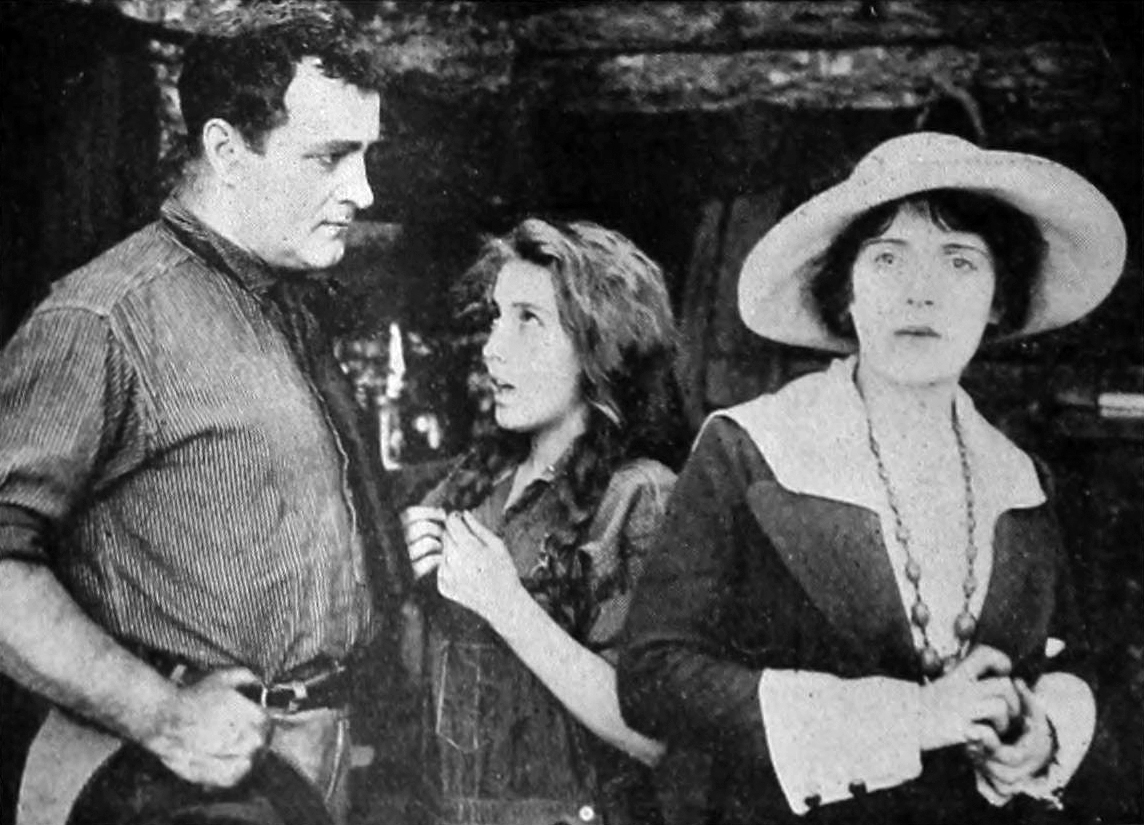
Wilfred Lucas, Bessie Love, and Mary Alden

- Wilfred Lucas as "Hell-to-Pay" Austin
- Bessie Love as Briar Rose "Nettles" Dawson
- Ralph Lewis as Dad Dawson
- Mary Alden as Doris Valentine
- Eugene Pallette as Harry Tracey
- James O'Shea as Jack Dale
- Clyde E. Hopkins as Daniel Marston
- Marie Wilkinson as Old Sallie
- Allan Sears (as A.D. Sears) as Fred
- William H. Brown as Peter
- Tom Wilson as Bill
- Monte Blue in a bit part (uncredited)

== Release ==
It was accompanied by the Charles Chaplin short comedy One A.M. in some theaters during its initial theatrical release and by the Fay Tincher short Skirts in some others.
