= Up from the Depths (1915 film) =

- Still from the film
- Directed by: Paul Powell
- Screenplay by: Mary H. O'Connor
- Based on: Up From the Depths by: Charles Battell Loomis; Robert Stodart
- Starring: Courtenay Foote; Gladys Brockwell; Thomas Jefferson
- Production company: Reliance Film Company
- Distributed by: Mutual Film Corporation
- Release date: June 17, 1915
- Running time: 4 reels
- Country: United States
- Language: Silent (English intertitles)

Up from the Depths is a 1915 silent drama film directed by Paul Powell. It was distributed by Mutual Film Corporation.

== Plot ==
Revivalist Davids persuades Daire Vincent to elope with him. Within the year, inspired by his associates to seek a held of greater grafting possibilities, he deserts her without having made her a wife, and goes to New York, where he meets with great success. Daire has a child, and. after many failures, becomes a dance hall singer to support it. In New York she is approached by Davids' confederates who ask her to help them in raiding the Mozart dive in which she works. She thus discovers David's present whereabouts and activities, and, taking her child, confronts him.

== Cast ==
- Courtenay Foote as Judon Davids
- Gladys Brockwell as Daire Vincent
- Thomas Jefferson as Father White
- William E. Lawrence as Lestrade
- Mae Gaston as Alice

== Reception ==
A contemporary review in The News Tribune was positive, praising both Gladys Brockwell's performance and the realism of various scenes. A contemporary review in the Daily Press praised both Brockwell and Courtenay Foote.
