= Betsy's Burglar =

1917 film by Paul Powell

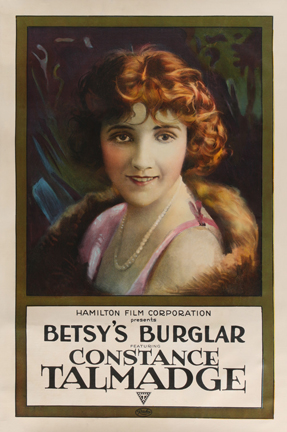
- Directed by: Paul Powell
- Written by: Frank E. Woods
- Produced by: D.W. Griffith
- Starring: Constance Talmadge; Kenneth Harlan; Monte Blue
- Cinematography: John W. Leezer
- Production company: Fine Arts Company
- Distributed by: Triangle Distributing
- Release date: March 4, 1917
- Running time: 50 minutes
- Country: United States
- Languages: Silent; English intertitles

Betsy's Burglar is a 1917 American silent comedy film directed by Paul Powell and starring Constance Talmadge, Kenneth Harlan and Monte Blue.

== Cast ==
- Constance Talmadge as Betsy Harlow
- Kenneth Harlan as Harry Brent
- Monte Blue as Victor Gilpin
- Joseph Singleton as Jasper Dunn
- Josephine Crowell as Mrs. Dunn
- Clyde E. Hopkins as Oscar Schlitz
- Hal Wilson as James
- Kate Bruce as Mrs. Randall
- Elmo Lincoln

== Bibliography ==
- Langman, Larry. American Film Cycles: The Silent Era. Greenwood Publishing, 1998.
