= Eleanor Hallowell Abbott =

American author (1872–1958)

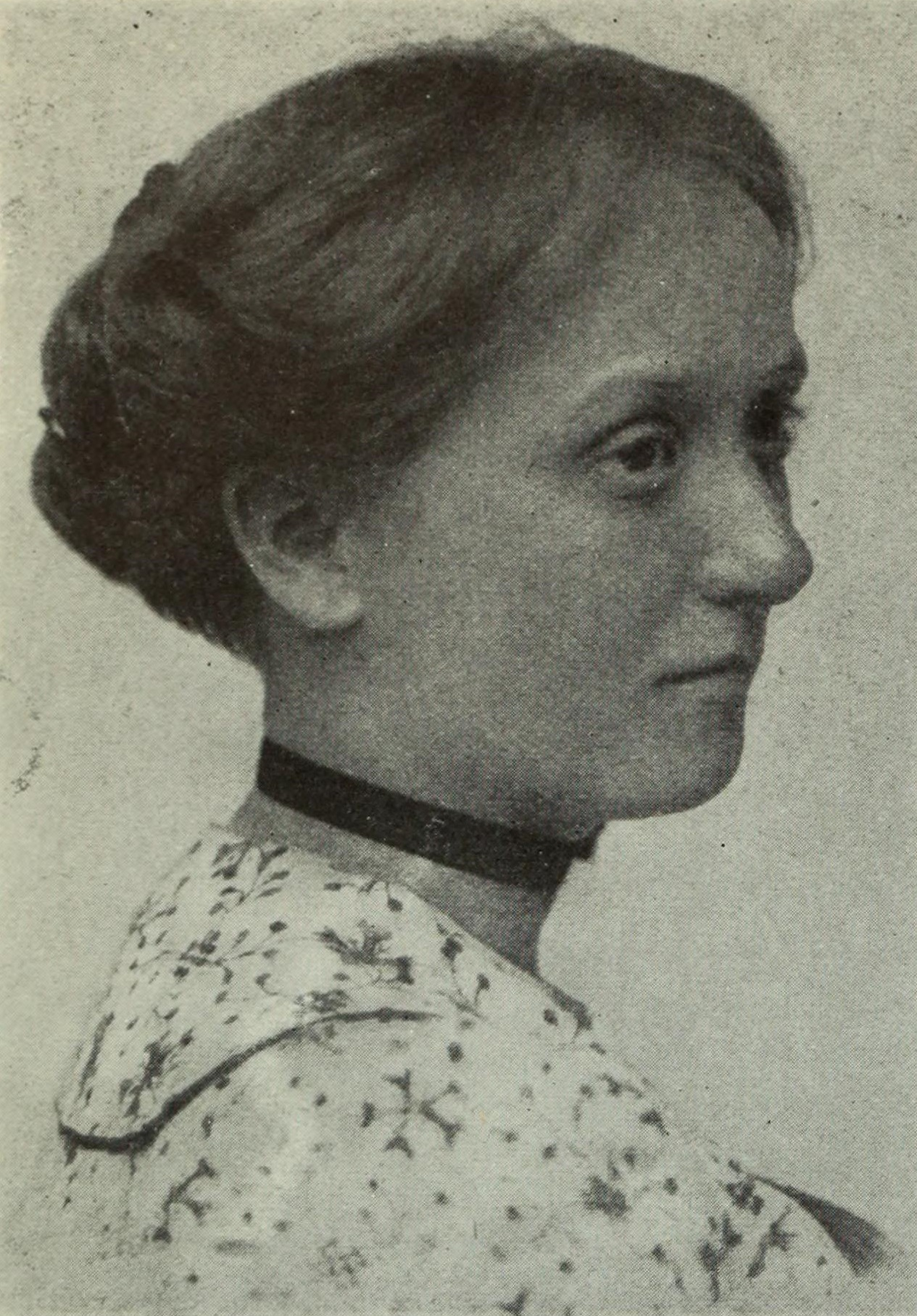
- Born: September 22, 1872; Cambridge, Massachusetts
- Died: June 4, 1958 (aged 85); Portsmouth, New Hampshire
- Occupation: Author
- Spouse: Fordyce Coburn (m. 1908)
- Writing career
- Language: English

Eleanor Hallowell Abbott (September 22, 1872 – June 4, 1958) was an American writer. She was a frequent contributor to The Ladies' Home Journal.

== Early life ==
Eleanor Hallowell Abbott was born on September 22, 1872, in Cambridge, Massachusetts. Abbott was the daughter of clergyman Edward Abbott and Clara (Davis), who edited the journal Literary World; and the granddaughter of noted children's author Jacob Abbott. Eleanor Hallowell Abbott grew up surrounded by literary and religious luminaries due to her father and grandfather. This resulted in her growing up knowing many famous literary people, like Longfellow and Lowell. This caused her childhood home to be one of great religious and scholarly thought.

After attending private schools in Cambridge, she began courses at Radcliffe College. After completing her studies, she worked as a secretary and teacher at Lowell State Normal School. Here, she began to write poetry and short stories, but had little success in the beginning. It was only when Harper's Magazine accepted two of her poems that she saw promise in her work. This led to her winning three short-story prizes offered by Collier's and The Delineator.

== Later life and literary career ==
In 1908, Abbott married Dr. Fordyce Coburn and relocated with him to Wilton, New Hampshire. Dr. Coburn was a medical advisor of the Lowell High School and would help his wife with her writing. Soon after moving, several widely read magazines accepted her work for publication. Two of her poems were accepted by Harper’s Monthly in 1909. She went on to publish seventy-five short stories and fourteen romantic novels. Being Little in Cambridge When Everyone Else Was Big is an autobiography written by Abbott about her childhood in Cambridge.

Abbott tells of how when she was a child, she was a nervous and excitable one, and through her fiction, she got in touch with this side to her. This is shown greatly through her work's intensity of feeling. Her writing is one of romance and even though some of her characters go through tough and painful times, each of her novels and stories carries a happy conclusion. The principal characters she uses are young girls who exhibit audacious behavior, are high strung, terribly talkative and full of unsettling demands while their male counterparts are the opposite - quiet, strong and tough against patient suffering.

Abbott would not allow her work to be published unless she truly liked it herself. Her chief concern while writing was to use her own feeling about the story she was working on. Due to this unique style, many critics comment that even though her work is charming it can feel sometimes forced.

Abbott had no children. She died in 1958 in Portsmouth, New Hampshire. The Eleanor Hallowell Abbott Papers are held by The University of New Hampshire Library in the Milne Special Collections. The collection primarily consists of typescripts of Abbott's short stories.

== Selected works ==
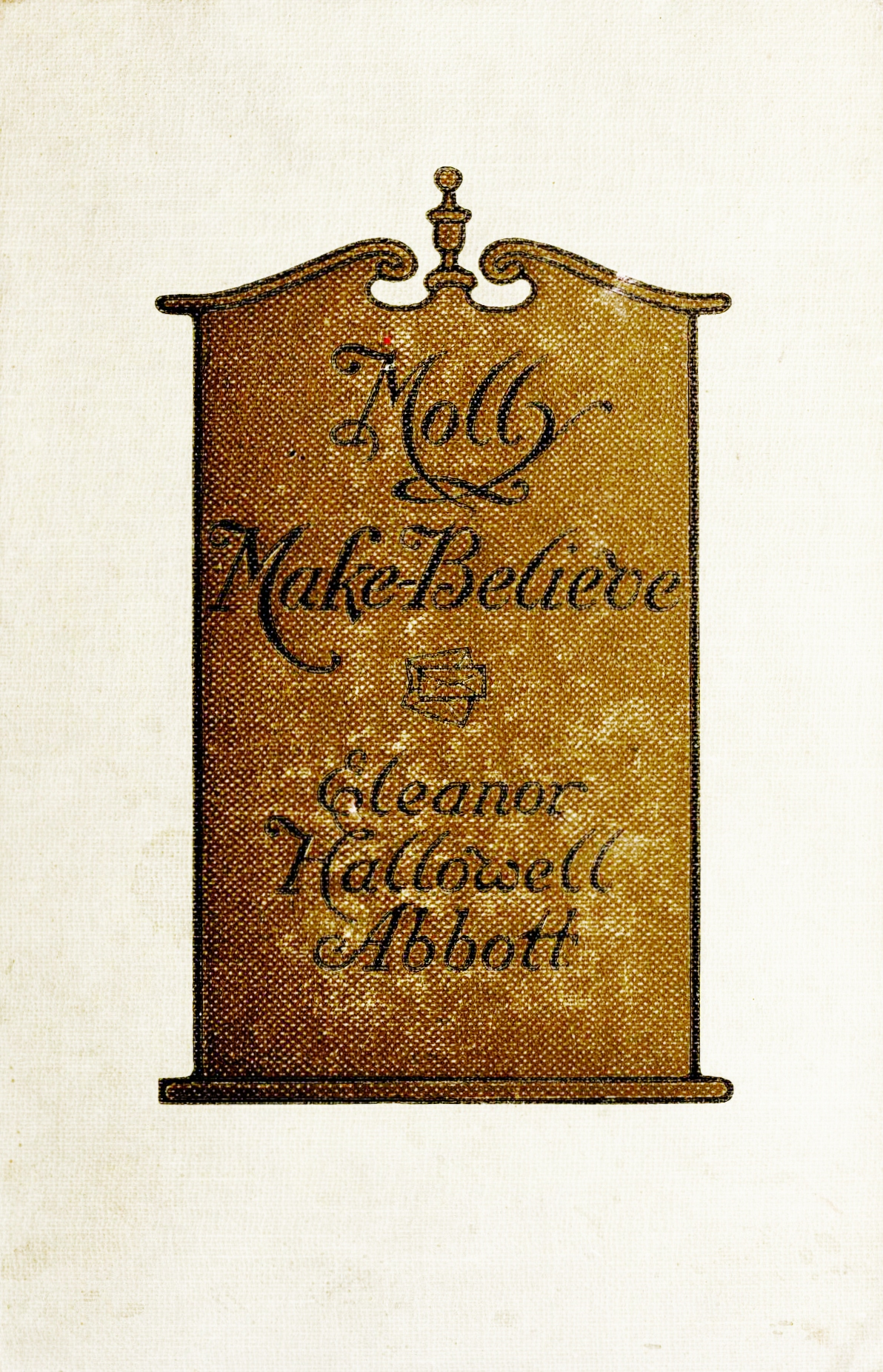
First edition cover of Molly Make-Believe, 1910

- Molly Make-Believe 1910
- The Sick-a-Bed Lady (and other tales) 1911
- The White Linen Nurse 1913
- Little Eve Edgarton 1914
- The Indiscreet Letter 1915
- The Ne'er Do Much 1918
- Love and Mrs. Kendrue 1919
- Old-Dad 1919
- Peace on Earth, Good-will to Dogs 1920
- Rainy Week 1921
- Fairy Prince and Other Stories 1922
- Silver Moon 1923
- But Once A Year: Christmas Stories 1928
- Being Little in Cambridge when Everyone Else was Big 1936

== Film adaptations ==
- Molly Make-Believe, directed by J. Searle Dawley (1916, based on the novel Molly Make-Believe)
- Little Eve Edgarton, directed by Robert Z. Leonard (1916, based on the novel Little Eve Edgarton)
- Old Dad, directed by Lloyd Ingraham (1920, based on the novel Old Dad)
