= The Road to Divorce =

1920 silent film directed by Phil Rosen

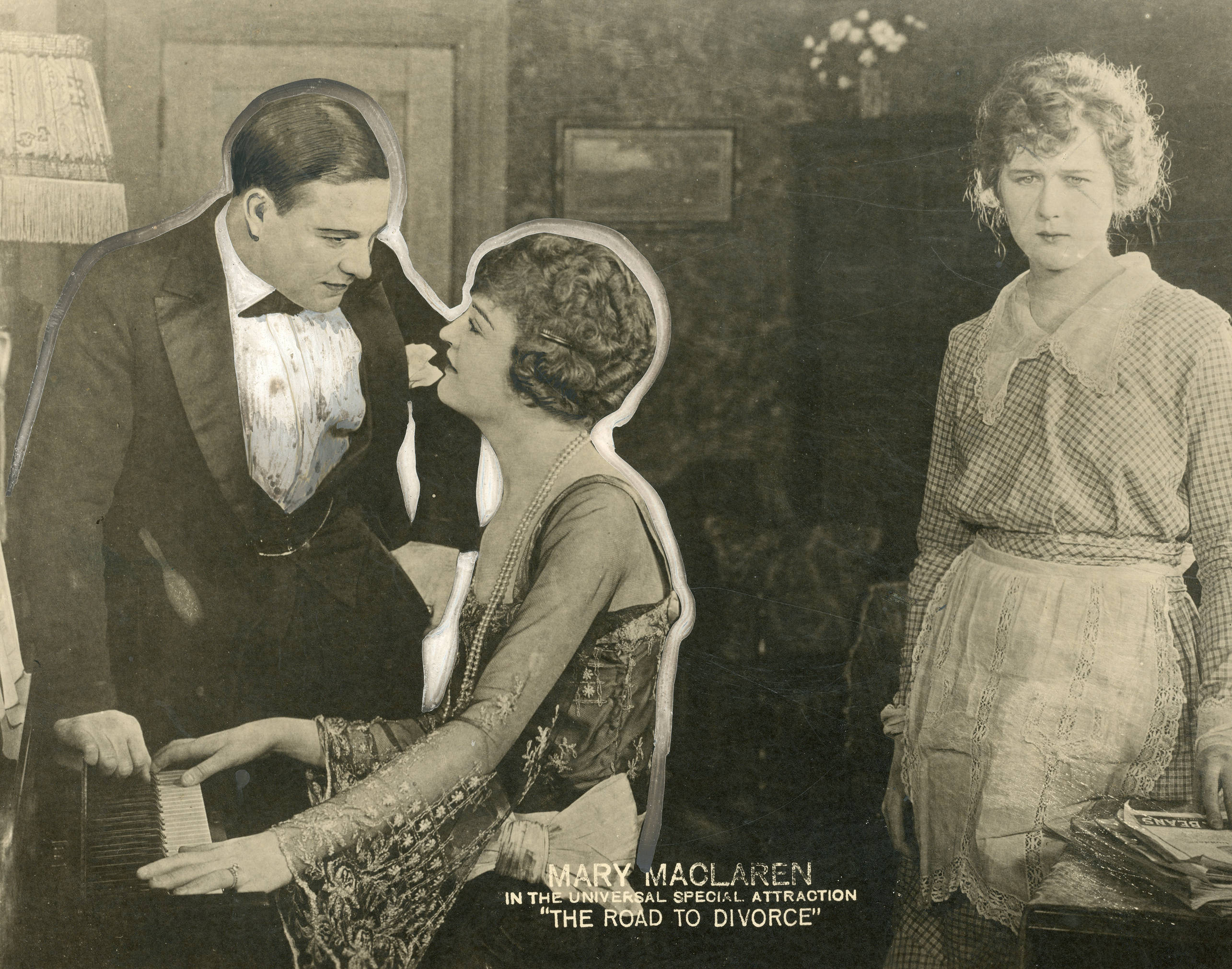
- Still
- Directed by: Phil Rosen
- Written by: J. Grubb Alexander
- Starring: Mary MacLaren; William Ellingford; Alberta Lee
- Cinematography: Harold Janes
- Production company: Universal Film
- Release date: April 5, 1920 (US)
- Running time: 5 reels
- Country: United States
- Language: Silent (English intertitles)

The Road to Divorce is a 1920 American silent drama film, directed by Phil Rosen. It stars Mary MacLaren, William Ellingford, and Alberta Lee, and was released on April 5, 1920.

== Cast ==
- Mary MacLaren as Mary Bird
- William Ellingford as Nathan Bird
- Alberta Lee as Mrs. Bird
- Edward Peil Sr. as Dr. Shaw
- Eugenie Forde as Aunt Mehitable
- Gloria Holt as Little Jane
- Arthur Redden as Little Johnny
- Bonnie Hill as Pauline Dallas
- Ray Stecker as Little son
- Helen Davidge as Nora
