= A Girl of the Timber Claims =

1917 film by Paul Powell

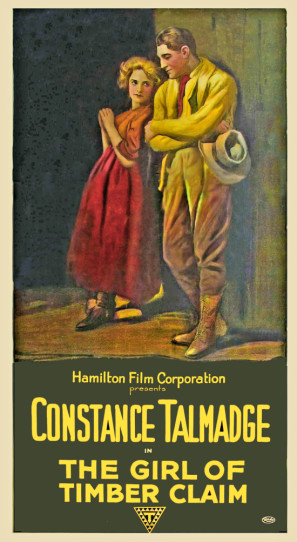
- Directed by: Paul Powell
- Written by: Mary H. O'Connor
- Produced by: D.W. Griffith
- Starring: Constance Talmadge; Allan Sears; Clyde E. Hopkins
- Cinematography: John W. Leezer
- Production company: Fine Arts Company
- Distributed by: Triangle Distributing
- Release date: February 11, 1917
- Running time: five reels
- Country: United States
- Languages: Silent; English intertitles

A Girl of the Timber Claims is a 1917 American silent drama film directed by Paul Powell and starring Constance Talmadge, Allan Sears and Clyde E. Hopkins. It is based on the story "The Girl Homesteader," by Mary H. O'Connor, who also wrote the screenplay.

== Cast ==
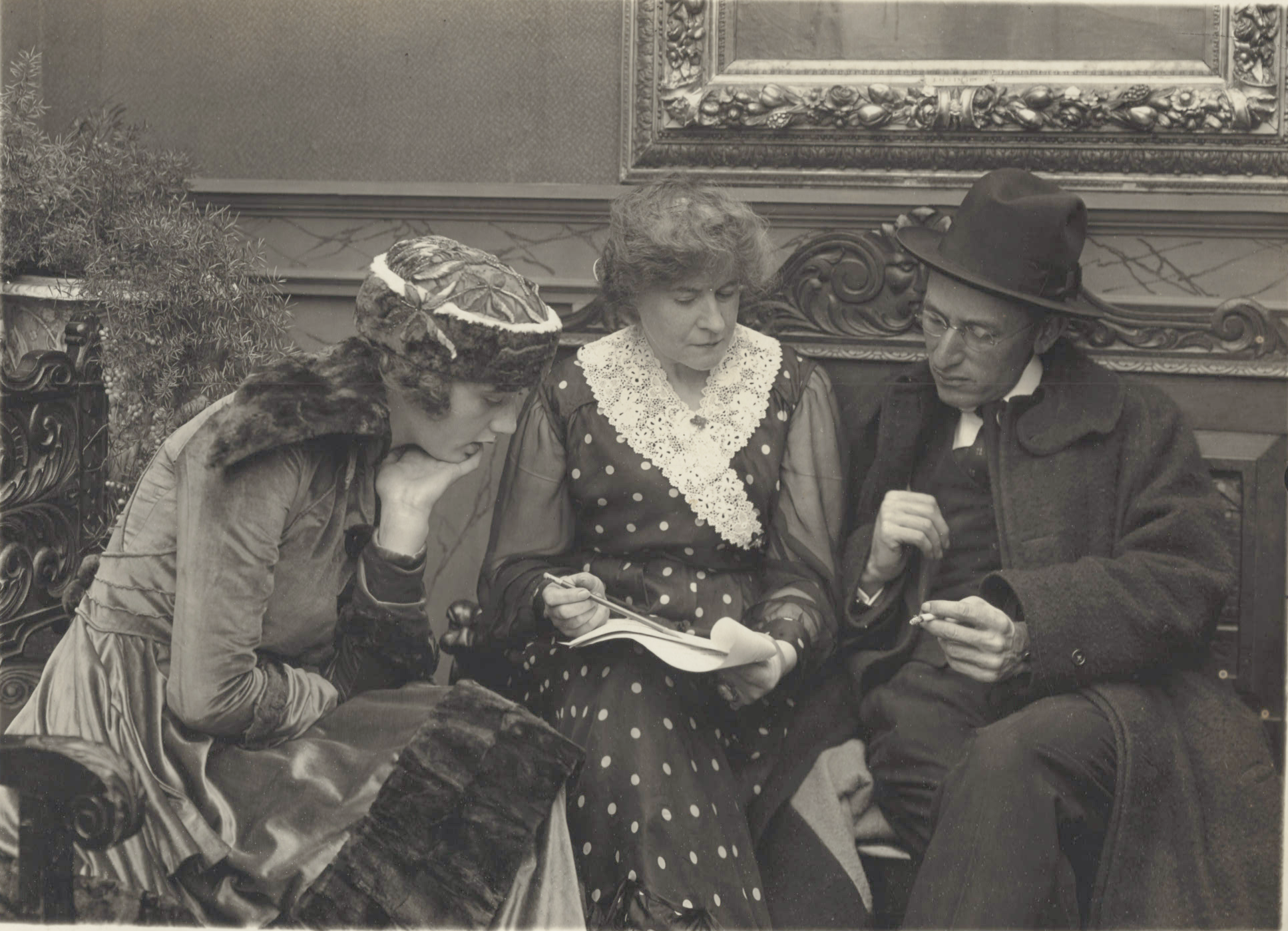
On the set of the film - lead actress Talmadge, writer O'Connor and director Powell

- Constance Talmadge as Jessie West
- Allan Sears as Francis Ames
- Clyde E. Hopkins as Bob Mullen
- Beau Byrd as Cora Abbott
- Wilbur Higby as Senator Hoyle
- Bennie Schumann as Eddie Stanley
- Joseph Singleton as Leather Hermit
- F.A. Turner as Jess's Father
- Margaret Talmadge as Mrs. Kiesey
- Charles Lee as A Homesteader

== Bibliography ==
- Jeanine Basinger. Silent Stars. Wesleyan University Press, 2000.
