= True Heart Susie =

1919 film directed by D. W. Griffith

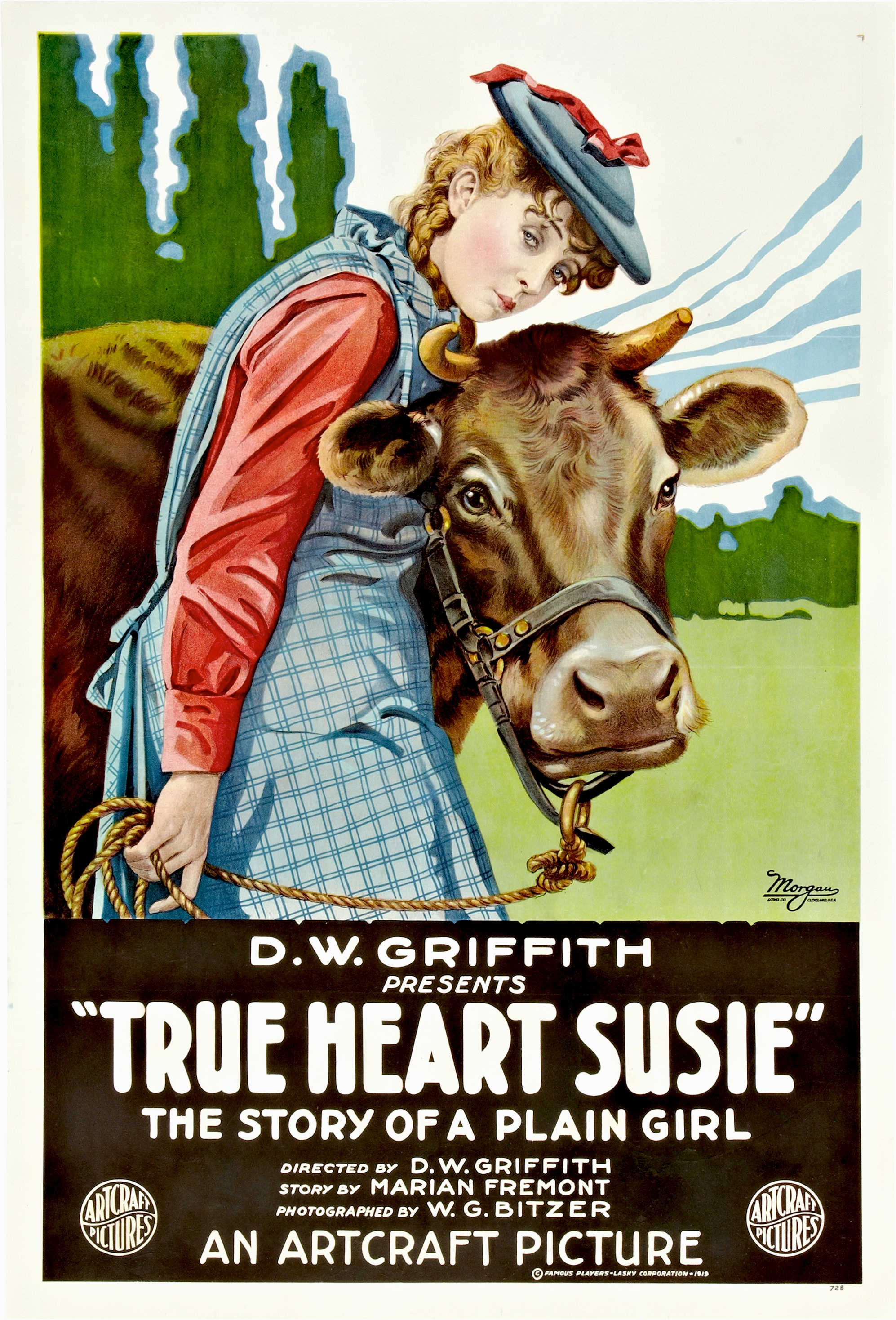
- Film poster
- Directed by: D. W. Griffith
- Written by: Marian Fremont
- Produced by: D. W. Griffith
- Starring: Lillian Gish
- Cinematography: G. W. Bitzer
- Edited by: James Smith
- Production company: D. W. Griffith Productions
- Distributed by: Artcraft Pictures Corporation
- Release date: June 1, 1919 (U.S.)
- Running time: 86 minutes
- Country: United States
- Language: Silent (English intertitles)

True Heart Susie (1919)

True Heart Susie is a 1919 American melodrama film directed by D. W. Griffith and starring Lillian Gish. A print of the film survives in the film archive of the British Film Institute. The film has seen several VHS releases as well as a DVD issue.

== Plot ==
True Heart Susie lives with her aunt and is deeply in love with William Jenkins. In secret, she sells the family's cow and other farm goods to finance William's college education. Unaware of her support, William completes his theological studies and returns home. He has encouraged Susie to dress plainly, and she continues to do so when they go for a soft drink during his return. However, he becomes infatuated with more fashionably dressed young women and eventually marries the lively Bettina "Betty" Hopkins. After William becomes a minister, he consults Susie about the idea of taking a wife, unaware of her feelings.

William expects Betty to adapt to his simple lifestyle. She struggles with domestic responsibilities, and William finds Susie's cooking more to his liking. The marriage proves difficult for both partners. Betty sneaks away one evening to attend a dance at a neighboring house. Caught in the rain and having lost her key, she seeks help from Susie, who shields her from suspicion.

The resulting illness from the rain proves fatal for Betty. Only after her death does William learn of her secret outing. He vows never to remarry but eventually recognizes Susie's devotion. He returns to offer her his hand in marriage.

== Cast ==
- Lillian Gish as True Heart Susie
- Robert Harron as William Jenkins
- Clarine Seymour as Bettina Hopkins
- Kate Bruce as Bettina's aunt
- Raymond Cannon as Sporty Malone
- Carol Dempster as Bettina's friend
- George Fawcett as the stranger
- Wilbur Higby as William's father
- Loyola O'Connor as Susie's aunt

== Reception and critical assessment ==
An outstanding performance from Lillian Gish elevates the character of Susie from the near-ridiculous to moments of the sublime...When she discovers William in the arms of Bettina, the restrained grief on her face and the tears that well up in her eyes during one long and continuous close-up contain the very essence of rejected devotion [producing] a scene which Miss Gish herself has rarely equaled. That smile, that shot, would alone justify the whole of Griffith's work, for it embodies all that is Griffith and all that is Gish, and the two talents combine to produce a perfect cinematic whole. It is one of those extraordinary moments in the cinema.

— Film historian Paul O'Dell, Griffith and the Rise of Hollywood (1970)

Film historian Paul O'Dell reports that "many commentators have noted the great charm of his picture, as well as moments of deep emotional intensity." Critic James Travers of French Films.org applies a number of superlatives to True Heart Susie, noting its "authenticity" and "realism," and praising Lillian Gish for her naturalistic portrayal of Susie.

Though filmed concurrently with Griffith's Broken Blossoms (1919), True Heart Susie was released after the more highly acclaimed work which also starred Lillian Gish. As such, True Heart Susie "is not, or has not been, more highly regarded than perhaps it should have been." (Note: Travers acknowledges that Griffith's handling of the picture was "modest" in its thematic aims.) TV Guide affirms the point:

True Heart Susie, overshadowed by Broken Blossoms, is a modest little film that shows Griffith at his most Victorian, but he treats the antediluvian plot with absolute sincerity and simplicity, transcending the primitive melodramatic cliches and creating a kind of elemental emotional truth.

Paul O'Dell adds:

In all of Griffith's pictures there is a certain amount of unashamed sentimentality; in True Heart Susie there is more than in most...technically, the film has few pretensions, and it is for this reason it is successful as a work of art...It is in fact the end of the film that is the weakest. Susie matures into a woman during the course of the action—a recurring Griffith theme—but when William eventually proposes she lapses uncomfortably back to her girlish coyness which dominated the beginning of the film. (Note: Travers notes the work's "innocence" and "down-to-earth" qualities.)

== Accolades ==
The film is recognized by American Film Institute in these lists:

- 2002: AFI's 100 Years...100 Passions – Nominated

== See also ==
- List of American films of 1919
