= An Old-Fashioned Young Man =

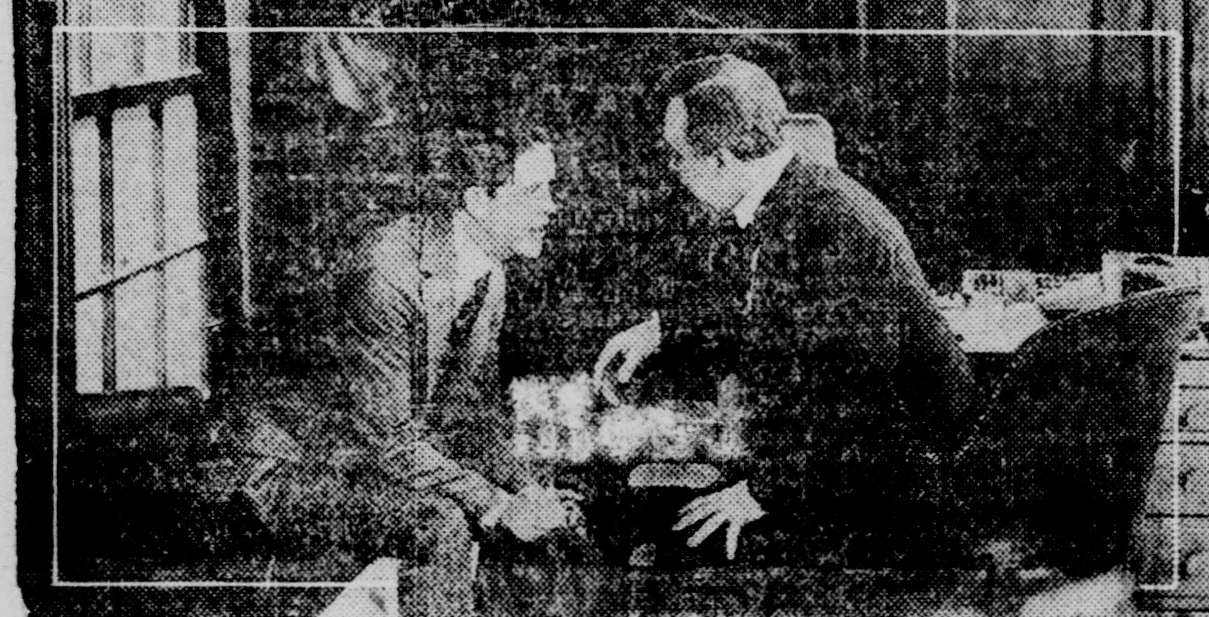
- Scene from the film
- Directed by: Lloyd Ingraham
- Story by: Frank E. Woods
- Starring: Robert Harron; Thomas Jefferson; Loyola O'Connor; Colleen Moore
- Production company: Fine Arts Company
- Distributed by: Triangle Film Corporation
- Release date: April 15, 1917
- Running time: 5 reels
- Country: United States
- Languages: Silent; English intertitles

An Old-Fashioned Young Man is a 1917 American silent drama film directed by Lloyd Ingraham and starring Robert Harron and Colleen Moore. The role was Moore's second credited film appearance and the first lead role of her career.

It was produced by D. W. Griffith's Fine Arts Company and distributed by Triangle Film Corporation on April 15, 1917.

== Plot ==
Frank Trent, a young man, goes into politics, but the people he works with are using dirty tricks to defeat Mrs. Burke, the candidate for mayor. They insist her adopted daughter, Margaret, is her own through an illicit affair. The story angers the chivalrous Frank, who is in love with Margaret, and decides to disprove it, travelling to find proof of her legitimate birth. He is dogged by scoundrels along the way. He learns his own father is actually Mrs. Burke's husband, who abandoned her year earlier believing her to be unfaithful. Frank finds the diary of a long dead doctor, which proves that Margaret's mother is not Mrs. Burke. Frank and Margaret are united and Mrs. Burke wins the election.

== Cast ==
- Robert Harron as Frank Trent
- Thomas Jefferson as James Trent, also known as James D. Burke
- Loyola O'Connor as Mrs. James D. Burke
- Colleen Moore as Margaret
- Adele Clifton as Nina Marquise
- Charles Lee as Charles Murdock
- Wilbur Higby as Senator Briggs
- Winifred Westover as Mame Morton
- Alberta Lee as The Housekeeper
- Sam De Grasse as Harold T. King
- Bert Hadley as His agent
- Tom Wilson as Dan Morton
