= The Mystery Road =

1921 film

- Directed by: Paul Powell
- Written by: Mary H. O'Connor; E. Phillips Oppenheim; Margaret Turnbull
- Starring: David Powell
- Cinematography: Hal Young
- Distributed by: Famous Players–Lasky British Producers
- Release date: 10 July 1921
- Running time: 68 minutes
- Country: United Kingdom
- Language: Silent with English intertitles

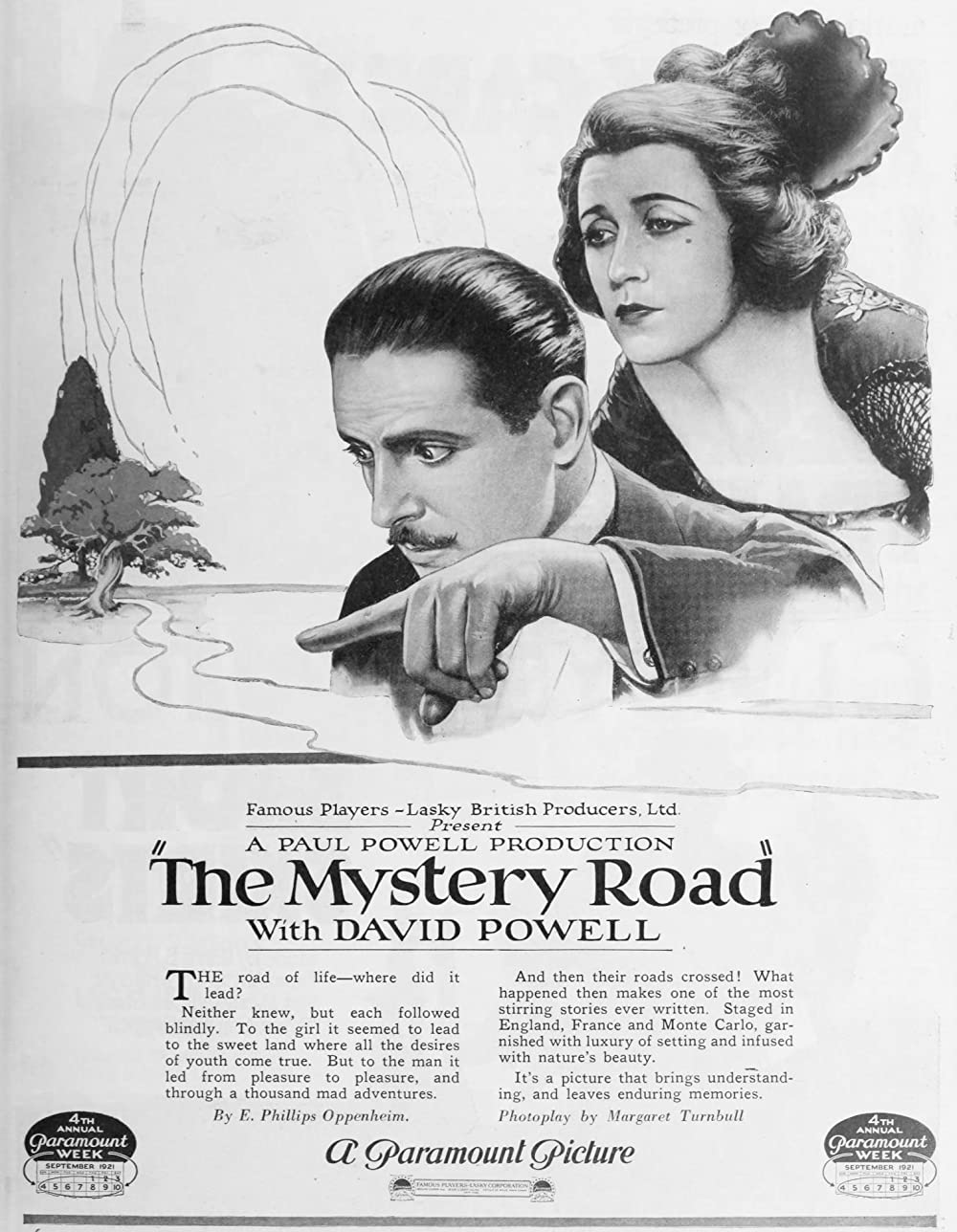
Advertisement for The Mystery Road.

The Mystery Road is a 1921 British silent drama film directed by Paul Powell. Alfred Hitchcock is credited as a title designer. The film is considered to be lost.

== Cast ==
- David Powell as Gerald Dombey
- Nadja Ostrovska as Myrtile Sargot
- Pardoe Woodman as Christopher Went
- Mary Glynne as Lady Susan Farrington
- Ruby Miller as Vera Lypashi
- Percy Standing as Luigi
- Lewis Gilbert as Jean Sargot
- Irene Tripod as Widow Dumesnel
- Lionel d'Aragon as Pierre Naval
- Arthur M. Cullin as Earl of Farrington
- Judd Green as The Vagabond

== See also ==
- Alfred Hitchcock filmography
