= Wilbur Higby =

American actor

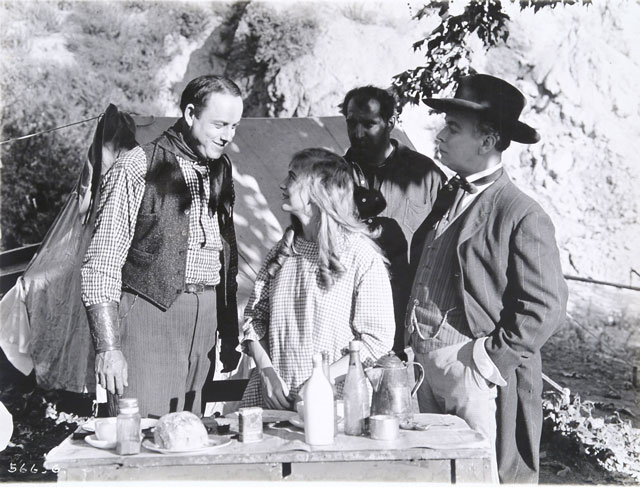
- Higby (right) in The Medicine Man, 1917
- Born: August 21, 1867; Meridian, Fourth Military District, U.S.
- Died: December 1, 1934 (aged 67); Hollywood, California, U.S.
- Years active: 1914-1934

Wilbur Higby (August 21, 1867 – December 1, 1934) was an American actor of the silent era. He appeared in more than 70 films between 1914 and 1934.

== Stage ==
In the mid-1890s, Higby was a member of the stock company of the Grand Opera House in Boston, Massachusetts. Later in the 1890s and into the early 1900s, he performed with other stock groups in a variety of locales such as York, Pennsylvania; Rochester, New York; and Brooklyn, New York.

By 1903, Higby had his own troupe, the Wilbur Higby Dramatic Company, which was described in a newspaper article as "one of the highest class repertoire organizations in this country." Within four years, however, the Higby Company had apparently ceased to exist. A 1907 newspaper article described Higby as "leading man with the Morey Stock Co. this season."

== Later life ==
Higby's daughter, Mary Jane Higby, was an actress in television and old-time radio who made one film appearance, as Janet Fay in The Honeymoon Killers. Higby died in Hollywood, California in 1934, aged 67, from pneumonia.

== Selected filmography ==
- Lucille Love, Girl of Mystery (1914)
- The Master Key (1914)
- The Mysterious Rose (1914)
- At the Stroke of the Angelus (1915) (short)
- Hoodoo Ann (1916)
- Mixed Blood (1916)
- Diane of the Follies (1916)
- The Mainspring (1916)
- Might and the Man (1917)
- The Medicine Man (1917)
- Wild Sumac (1917)
- The Tar Heel Warrior (1917)
- A Girl of the Timber Claims (1917)
- An Old-Fashioned Young Man (1917)
- The Midnight Man (1917) as John Hardin
- I'll Get Him Yet (1919)
- True Heart Susie (1919)
- Nugget Nell (1919)
- Brass Buttons (1919)
- The Mayor of Filbert (1919)
- The Terror (1920)
- The Jailbird (1920)
- The Price of Redemption (1920)
- Desert Blossoms (1921)
- Play Square (1921)
- Live Wires (1921)
- The Third Alarm (1922)
- Do and Dare (1922)
- The Ladder Jinx (1922)
- The Love Trap (1923)
- Richard the Lion-Hearted (1923)
- The Flaming Forties (1924)
- Confessions of a Queen (1925)
- Lights of Old Broadway (1925)
- God's Great Wilderness (1927)
- Morals for Women (1931)
- St. Louis Woman (1934)
