= Live Wires (1921 film) =

1921 film directed by Edward Sedgwick

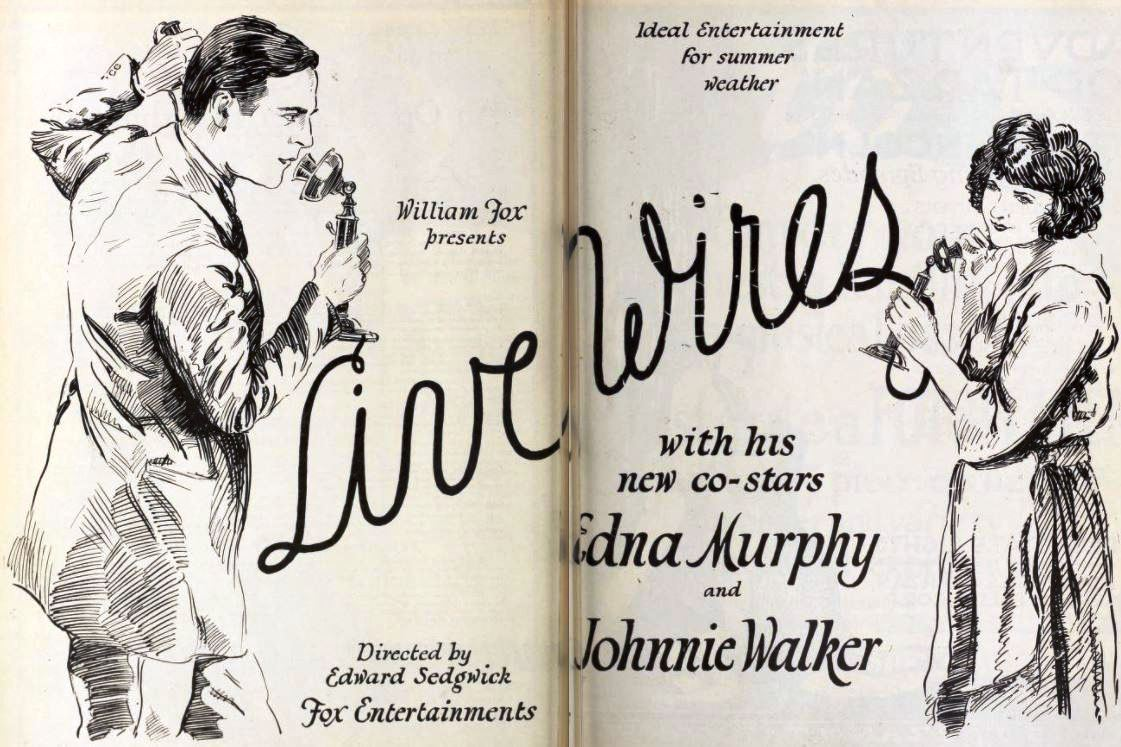
- Directed by: Edward Sedgwick
- Written by: Charles E. Cook; Edward Sedgwick; John Stone
- Produced by: William Fox
- Starring: Johnnie Walker; Edna Murphy; Alberta Lee
- Cinematography: Victor Milner
- Production company: Fox Film Corporation
- Distributed by: Fox Film Corporation
- Release date: July 17, 1921
- Running time: 50 minutes
- Country: United States
- Languages: Silent; English intertitles

Live Wires is a lost 1921 American silent drama film directed by Edward Sedgwick and starring Johnnie Walker, Edna Murphy and Alberta Lee.

== Cast ==
- Johnnie Walker as Bob Harding
- Edna Murphy as Rena Austin
- Alberta Lee as Mrs. Harding
- Frank Clark as James Harding
- Robert Klein as Slade
- Hayward Mack as James Flannery
- Wilbur Higby as Austin
- Lefty James as The Coach

== Bibliography ==
- Connelly, Robert B. The Silents: Silent Feature Films, 1910-36, Volume 40, Issue 2. December Press, 1998.
- Munden, Kenneth White. The American Film Institute Catalog of Motion Pictures Produced in the United States, Part 1. University of California Press, 1997.
- Solomon, Aubrey. The Fox Film Corporation, 1915-1935: A History and Filmography. McFarland, 2011.
