= Loyola O'Connor =

American actress

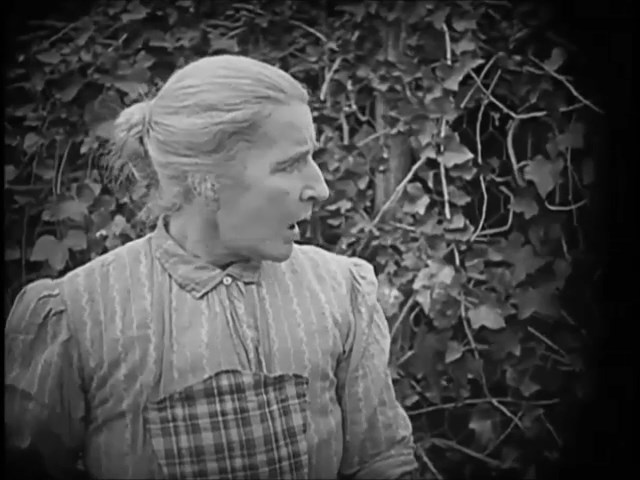
- O'Connor in True Heart Susie (1919)
- Born: July 8, 1868; St. Paul, Minnesota, US
- Died: December 26, 1931 (aged 63); Los Angeles, California, US
- Occupation: Actress
- Years active: 1913–1922
- Relatives: Mary H. O'Connor (sister)

Loyola O'Connor (born Ignatia Loyola O'Connor; July 8, 1868 – December 26, 1931), was an American stage and silent film actress. In the early 20th century, she worked multi-year stints in stage productions such as Way Down East, Ben Hur and Rebecca of Sunnybrook Farm. In 1913, she transitioned to silent films, appearing in 48 productions through 1922. She was born in St. Paul, Minnesota and died in Los Angeles, California.

== Selected filmography ==
- The Kiss (1914)
- A Little Madonna (1914)
- The Lily and the Rose (1915)
- Out of the Darkness (1915)
- The Country Boy (1915)
- Hoodoo Ann (1916)
- Stranded (1916)
- The Children Pay (1916)
- Cheerful Givers (1916)
- Atta Boy's Last Race (1916)
- Nina, the Flower Girl (1917)
- An Old-Fashioned Young Man (1917) - Mrs. James D. Burke
- True Heart Susie (1919)
- Soft Money (1919)
- Eyes of the Heart (1920)
- The Tree of Knowledge (1920)
- Harriet and the Piper (1920)
- Old Dad (1920)
- The Infidel (1922)
