= Dangerous Lies (1921 film) =

1921 British film by Paul Powell

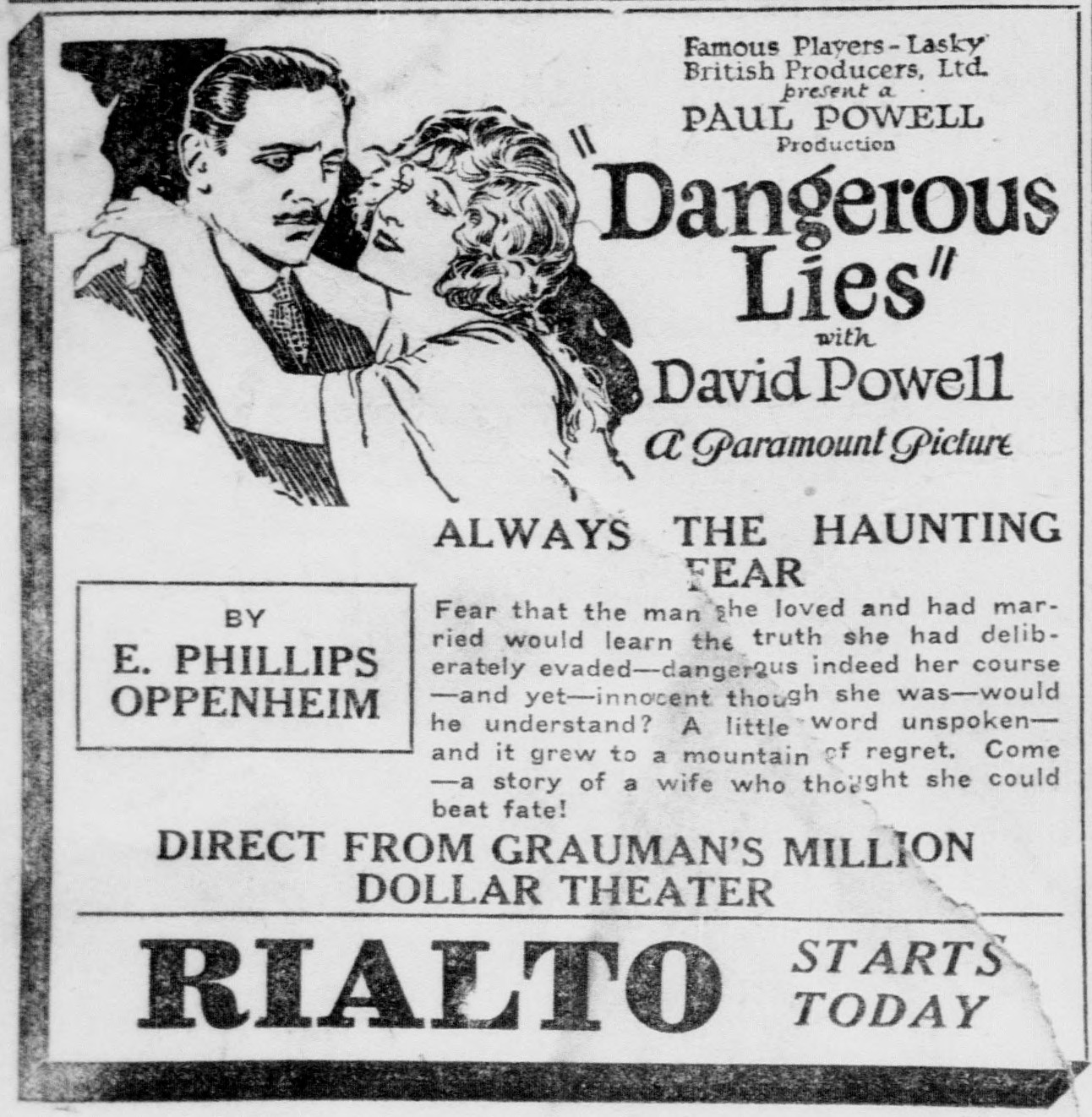
- Contemporary American newspaper advertisement for the film.
- Directed by: Paul Powell
- Written by: Mary H. O'Connor
- Based on: "Twice Wed" by E. Phillips Oppenheim
- Starring: David Powell
- Distributed by: Famous Players–Lasky British Producers
- Release date: 18 September 1921
- Running time: 66 minutes
- Country: United Kingdom
- Language: Silent (English intertitles)

Dangerous Lies is a 1921 British silent drama film directed by Paul Powell. Alfred Hitchcock is credited as a title designer. The film is now lost.

== Plot ==
As described in a film magazine, Joan, a poor rector's daughter, marries a bounder and, after she discovers his true character, leaves him to make her way in London. She meets and falls in love with Sir Henry Bond, a wealthy collector of antique books, and marries him after reading of her husband's sudden death. Later it is discovered that her husband was not dead, and that he had the notice printed to throw creditors off his trail. Joan goes to his hotel room and a struggle ensues in which her husband falls dead from a heart attack, leaving her free for happiness with her book connoisseur.

== Cast ==
- David Powell as Sir Henry Bond
- Mary Glynne as Joan Farrant
- Arthur M. Cullin as Eli Hodges
- Ernest A. Douglas as Reverend Farrant
- Warburton Gamble as Leonard Pearce
- Clifford Grey as Franklin Bond
- Minna Grey as Olive Farrant
- Harry Ham as Phelps Westcott
- Philip Hewland as Doctor
- Daisy Sloane as Nanette
