= Paul Gilmore =

Stage actor

- Gilmore c. 1900
- Born: July 14, 1873; Milwaukee, Wisconsin, United States
- Died: December 29, 1962 (aged 89); Palm Springs, Florida, United States
- Burial place: Mt. Olivet Cemetery, Key West, Iowa, United States
- Occupations: Stage actor Silent film actor
- Years active: 1891–1955
- Spouse: Regina Cooper
- Children: 2

Paul Gilmore (July 14, 1873 – 1962) was a popular stage actor of the late 19th and early 20th centuries who also appeared in no fewer than 10 silent films. Additionally, he owned and managed for many years the Cherry Lane Theatre in New York City – giving work to such future stars as Robert Walker Sr., Jennifer Jones and Carl Reiner. In his declining years, he and his daughter, Virginia, operated the Gilmore Summer Stock Theatre in Duluth, Minnesota.

== Early career ==
Paul Howard Gilmore was born July 14, 1873, in Milwaukee, Wisconsin. His parents intended him to pursue a law career, but as a teenager Gilmore developed an interest in acting when he performed in amateur plays at Milwaukee's Grand Opera House, which was owned by his successful publisher father. Theatrical producer Jacob Litt saw Gilmore perform and, in 1891, offered him a role in his traveling show, The Ensign. On a lark, Gilmore accepted, intending to stay with the company for a few weeks and then return home to study law. He never did, instead continuing to perform with Litt's players in a number of successful productions that included Uncle Tom's Cabin and In Old Kentucky.

Gilmore quickly rose to leading man status. His clean-cut features, expressive brown eyes and shock of dark, wavy hair netted him many romantic roles, and his penchant for fine attire earned him a reputation as “the youngest, best-dressed leading man on the American stage.". By 1896 he had left Litt's Players and gained stature with Charles Frohman in plays such as The Wife, Americans Abroad and Sweet Lavender.

== Film pioneer ==
In addition to his stage work, Gilmore participated in the early development of motion pictures in the United States. Starting in 1897, he performed short "character studies" on film for the American Mutuoscope Company (later to become the Biograph Company) and performed for Thomas Alva Edison's company on a number of short (less than 60-second) works that included A Pillow Fight, The Vanishing Lady, The Miser, Herman the Great and Caught In the Act.. He also claimed to have appeared in one Edison feature, The Artist's Model, in 1918, but is not listed as one of the principal actors.

On June 17, 1897, Gilmore married Regina Cooper, the daughter of millionaire wagon maker A.A. Cooper of Dubuque, Iowa, Two years later, on Sept. 9, 1899, Gilmore's wife delivered twins – a boy and a girl. Regina Cooper Gilmore died of heart failure two days after giving birth. Gilmore allowed A. A. Cooper to assume custody of the children, give them the Cooper surname and raise them, while he continued to tour.

Gilmore's son, Paul Gilmore Cooper, died in 1916 after leaping off a train on which he had hitched a ride. When Gilmore's daughter, Regina, reached maturity, she joined her father in New York, adopted the stage name of Virginia, and assisted him in his theatrical work for the rest of his life.

== Near-fatal accident ==
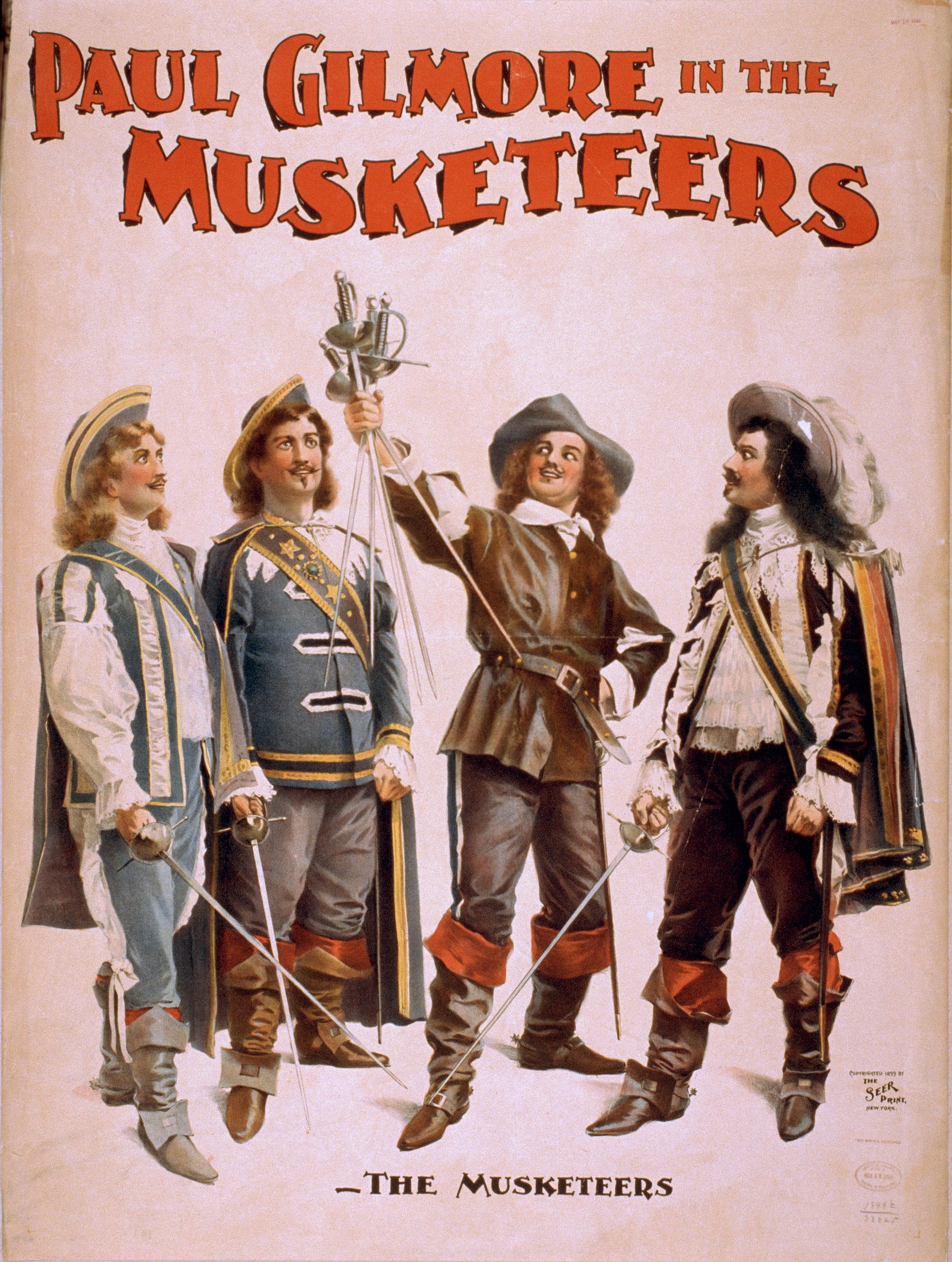
Poster for The Musketeers, circa 1899

Three months after the death of his wife, Gilmore was nearly killed in a production of The Musketeers in Phoenix, Arizona. On Dec. 16, 1899, Gilmore and two other actors were critically wounded when they were shot with live rounds that had accidentally been loaded into a stage pistol. Gilmore received six wounds, the most serious in his legs. Gilmore was at first not expected to live; when he did, doctors gave him little chance of being able to return to the stage. A bullet was removed from his knee in March 1900, after which he began to recover. By October of that year, he was again on the road, appearing in Under the Red Robe.

Actor Lewis Monroe died of lockjaw a month after the accident as the result of a bullet wound to the hand.

== Middle career ==
The Paul Gilmore Cherry Lane Theatre

Gilmore reached full star status in late 1900 with his performance in The Dawn of Freedom at the Fourteenth Street Theatre in New York City. He performed relentlessly all over the country in scores of plays, often in roles that portrayed him as a swashbuckling lover. Audiences flocked to see him in productions such as Captain Debonnaire, The Mummy and the Hummingbird and The Boys of Company B.

Gilmore married Mary A. Goodwin in 1901 and was divorced from her in January 1909. In November of that year, he married actress Ethel Elizabeth Cauley, while on tour in Staunton, Virginia.

In addition to operating his own touring stage company and acting in productions throughout the United States, Gilmore began making feature films in 1915. By 1920, he had starred or had major roles in nine movies and accumulated more than $225,000 in cash and tangible assets, including 40 acres (160,000 m^{2}) of land on Anna Maria Island in Florida. It was here that he hoped to build a movie colony – Paul Gilmore’s Oriental Film City – that would rival Hollywood. He and his fourth wife, Pickett Gilmore, were principal officers in the company.

Gilmore and Albert Plummer of Character Pictures began filming the South Seas adventure, The Isle of Destiny, in the spring of 1920, on Anna Maria Island. Gilmore pumped huge amounts of his own cash into the production, footing the bill for the importation by boat (there was no serviceable road or bridge to the island) of cars, horses and some 200 actors.

The Isle of Destiny, a six-reeler, performed well when it premiered in New York theaters, and Gilmore planned at least two other films for production on Anna Maria Island. But his speculations in real estate failed, and Gilmore lost all his assets and most of his cash. He returned to New York City, where he settled in Greenwich Village over a tobacco warehouse that he would transform into the Paul Gilmore Cherry Lane Theatre. Divorced from his fourth wife by the 1930s, he was joined in New York by his daughter, and together they ran the small venue and starred in many of its productions.

== Final years ==
Paul and Virginia Gilmore at the Cherry Lane Theatre

In 1948, the Gilmores moved to Duluth, Minnesota, where they established the Gilmore Comedy Theatre in a 40- by 80-foot (24 m) Quonset hut they constructed along Lake Superior. The theater opened on July 14, 1949, with a production of This Thing Called Love. Gilmore operated the theater until age and declining health forced him to sell it in 1955.

Gilmore and his daughter retired to Dubuque, Iowa, where they resided at 418 Raymond Place. Gilmore died while wintering in Palm Springs, Florida, on December 29, 1962, at the age of 89. He is buried in Mt. Olivet Cemetery in Key West, Iowa.

Regina Cooper Gilmore died in Dubuque on Sept. 22, 1981. Upon her death, the Gilmore estate, which was valued in excess of $1 million, was divided among relatives and the church, Catholic charities and Saint Raphael's Cathedral.

== Filmography ==
=== Feature films ===
- The Isle of Destiny (1920) .... Jim Stafford
- The Mad Woman (1919)
- The Artist's Model (1918)
- The Shrine of Happiness (1916) .... Ted Clark
- The House of Mystery (1926)
- The Other Girl (1920) .... Rev. Clifton Bradford
- Rosemary (1915) .... Capt. William Westwood
- A Woman's Wiles (1915)
- The Penitentes (1915) .... Colonel Juan Raca
- The Lost Secret (1915)
- The Conjurer's House (19??)

=== Edison/Biograph Shorts ===
- The Pillow Fight (1897)
- The Vanishing Lady (1897)
- The Miser (1897)
- Herman the Great (1897)
- Caught In the Act (1897)
- The Waiter (1898)
