= The Love Letter (1923 film) =

1923 film

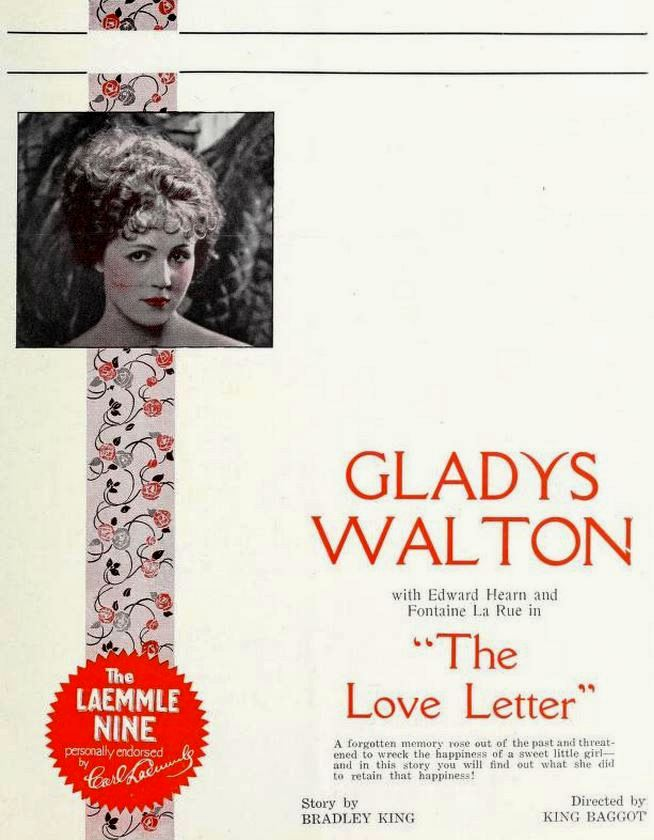
- Trade advertisement
- Directed by: King Baggot
- Screenplay by: Hugh Hoffman
- Story by: Bradley King
- Starring: Gladys Walton; Fontaine La Rue; George Cooper; Edward Hearn; Walt Whitman; Alberta Lee
- Cinematography: Victor Milner
- Production company: Universal Pictures
- Distributed by: Universal Pictures
- Release date: February 9, 1923
- Running time: 50 minutes
- Country: United States
- Language: Silent (English intertitles)

The Love Letter is a 1923 American silent drama film directed by King Baggot and written by Hugh Hoffman. The film stars Gladys Walton, Fontaine La Rue, George Cooper, Edward Hearn, Walt Whitman, and Alberta Lee. The film was released on February 9, 1923, by Universal Pictures.

== Plot ==
As described in a film magazine, Mary Ann McKee is released from an overalls factory for secreting mash notes in the pockets of the finished clothing. An answer she received appeals to her and she shows it to her steady beau Red Mike Johnson, who jealously warns her to write no more love letters. Red Mike forces her to act as a lookout while his gang pulls a robbery that night. Mike is caught, but Mary Ann escapes and flees the city, deciding to look up the author of the letter that appealed to her. In the country she finds its author, Bill Carter, a young village blacksmith. it turns out that he did not actually write the letter, it having been sent by his friends as a joke on him. He decides to assist her and induces the village minister Reverend Halloway and his wife to adopt Mary Ann. Later Bill marries Mary Ann and their life is made happy by the arrival of a child. Then one day Red Mike appears, demanding the money he gave Mary Ann the night of the robbery but which she had thrown away. He is determined to take Mary Ann back with him to the city. Bill comes into the home and Red Mike covers him with a gun. Knowing that her husband might be killed, Mary Ann lies and tells Red Mike that she loves him. Heart-broken, Bill collapses into a chair. Mary Ann picks up her baby to kiss it goodbye. Seeing in Mary Ann the attitude of the Madonna stirs the religious faith of Red Mike, and with a confession he leaves.

== Cast ==
- Gladys Walton as Mary Ann McKee
- Fontaine La Rue as Kate Smith
- George Cooper as Red Mike Johnson
- Edward Hearn as Bill Carter
- Walt Whitman as Reverend Halloway
- Alberta Lee as Mrs. Halloway
- Lucy Donahue as Mrs. Carter

== Preservation ==
With no holdings located in archives, The Love Letter is considered a lost film.
