= Mary H. O'Connor =

American screenwriter and film editor

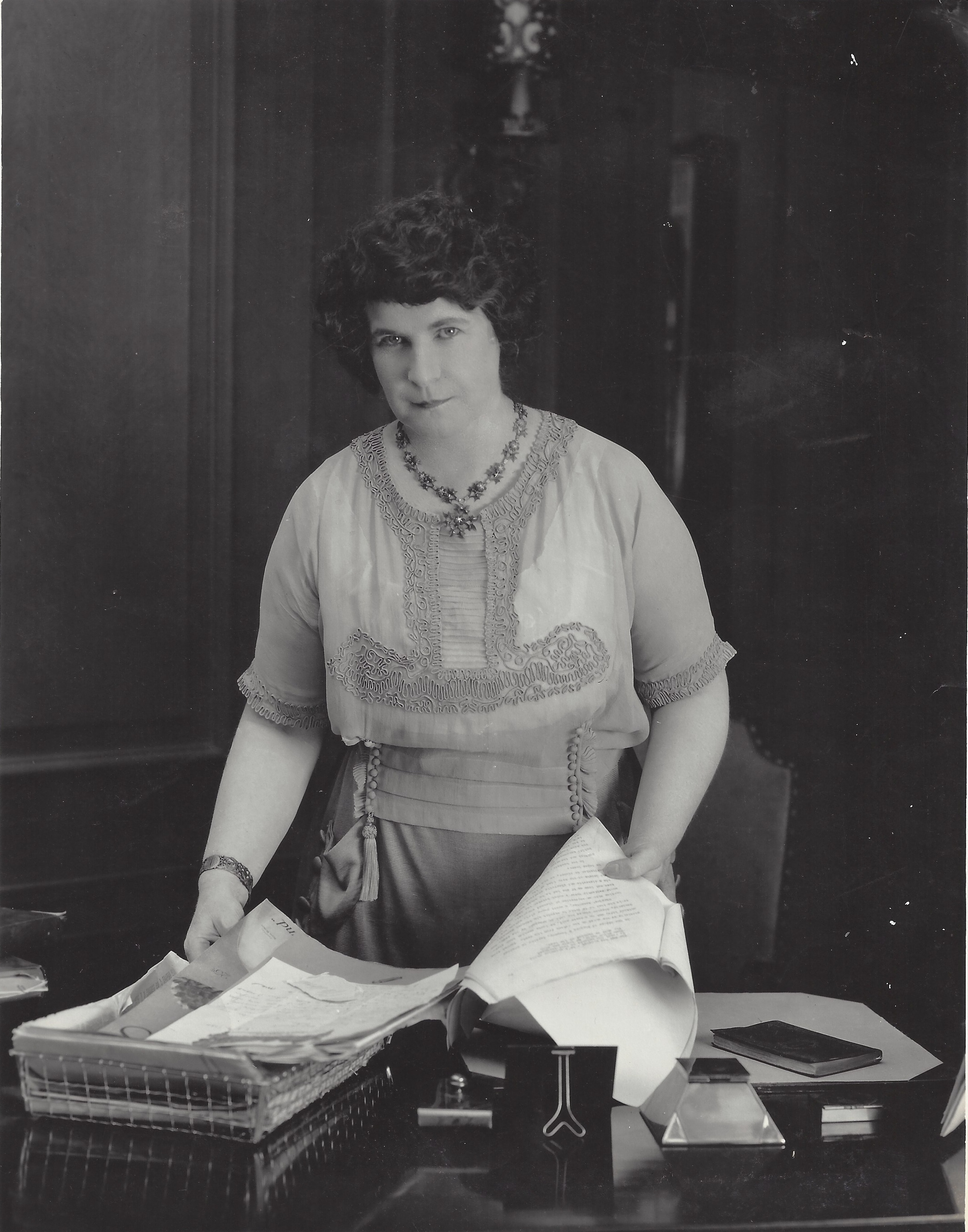
- Born: Mary Hamilton O'Connor; September 1, 1872; Saint Paul, Minnesota, USA
- Died: September 3, 1959 (aged 87); Los Angeles, California, USA
- Occupation(s): Screenwriter, film editor
- Spouse: none
- Relatives: Loyola O'Connor (sister)

Mary H. O'Connor (sometimes credited as Mary Hamilton O'Connor) was an American screenwriter and film editor active during Hollywood's silent era.

== Biography ==
She was born in Saint Paul, Minnesota, in 1872, the daughter of Thomas O'Connor and Bridget Nash. She came from a big family (which included a sister, Loyola O'Connor, who became an actress), and grew up in Minnesota, Oregon, and New York.

She began her career as a magazine and newspaper journalist in New York before Hollywood came calling. By 1913, she was living in Santa Monica and churning out scripts at a rapid pace under contract at Vitagraph. At the time, she said she hoped to become a director. Eventually, she was named chief of Triangle-Fine Arts' scenario department. She'd also work at Mutual and Famous Players–Lasky.

In 1921, she left Hollywood to work at Paramount's then-new London studio, where she worked on scripts for films like Dangerous Lies and The Mystery Road. She retired from screenwriting to work on creative fiction after those films.

== Selected filmography ==
- The Lure of the Mask (1915)
- The Lonesome Heart (1915)
- Up from the Depths (1915)
- A Yankee from the West (1915)
- Infatuation (1915)
- The Penitentes (1915)
- Cross Currents (1916)
- Hell-to-Pay Austin (1916)
- The House Built Upon Sand (1916)
- Intolerance (1916)
- Nina, the Flower Girl (1917)
- A Girl of the Timber Claims (1917)
- Cheerful Givers (1917)
- Souls Triumphant (1917)
- The Sins of Roseanne (1920)
- The Mystery Road (1921)
- Dangerous Lies (1921)
