= Let Women Alone =

1925 film

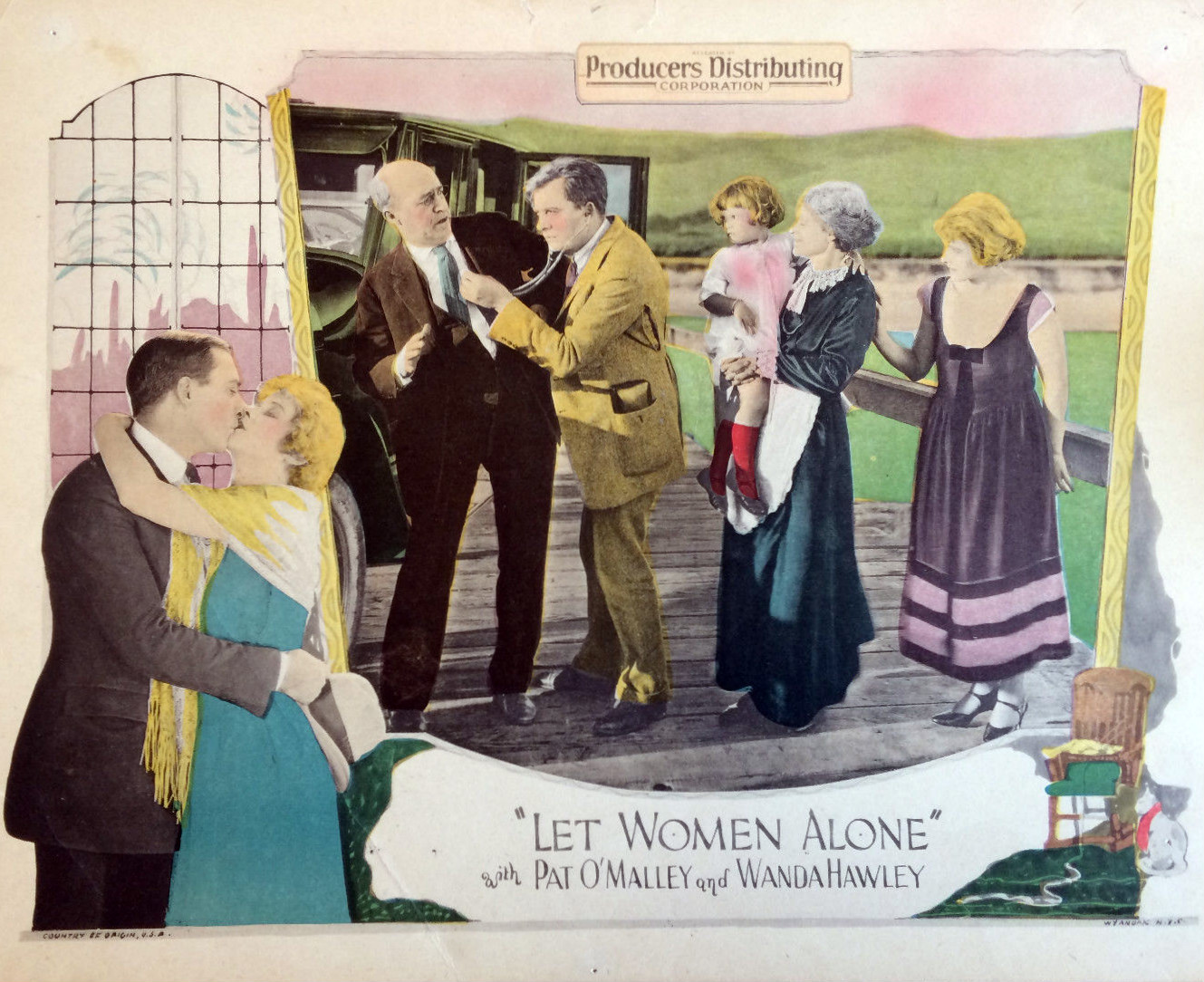
- Directed by: Paul Powell
- Written by: Viola Brothers Shore; Frank E. Woods
- Produced by: Frank E. Woods
- Starring: Pat O'Malley; Wanda Hawley; Wallace Beery
- Cinematography: Joseph Walker
- Production company: Peninsula Studios
- Distributed by: Producers Distributing Corporation
- Release date: January 4, 1925
- Running time: 60 minutes
- Country: United States
- Languages: Silent; English intertitles

Let Women Alone is a 1925 American silent comedy film directed by Paul Powell and starring Pat O'Malley, Wanda Hawley and Wallace Beery.

== Plot ==
After her husband is reportedly drowned at sea, his wife supports herself and their child by setting up a small interior decorating shop. She falls in love with Tom Benham, an insurance agent but her uncle a Commodore opposes the match and tries to thwart her business. Things take a dramatic shift when her husband reappears alive and involved with a racket smuggling Chinese illegal immigrants into America. He kidnaps her and the commodore and Tom give chase and rescue her.

== Cast ==
- Pat O'Malley as Tom Benham
- Wanda Hawley as Beth Wylie
- Wallace Beery as Cap Bullwinkle
- Ethel Wales as Ma Benham
- J. Farrell MacDonald as Commodore John Gordon
- Harris Gordon as Jim Wylie
- Betty Jane Snowdon as Jean Wylie
- Lee Willard as Alec Morrison
- Marjorie Morton as Isabel Morrison

== Bibliography ==
- Connelly, Robert B. The Silents: Silent Feature Films, 1910-36, Volume 40, Issue 2. December Press, 1998.
- Munden, Kenneth White. The American Film Institute Catalog of Motion Pictures Produced in the United States, Part 1. University of California Press, 1997.
