= The Fourteenth Lover =

1922 film

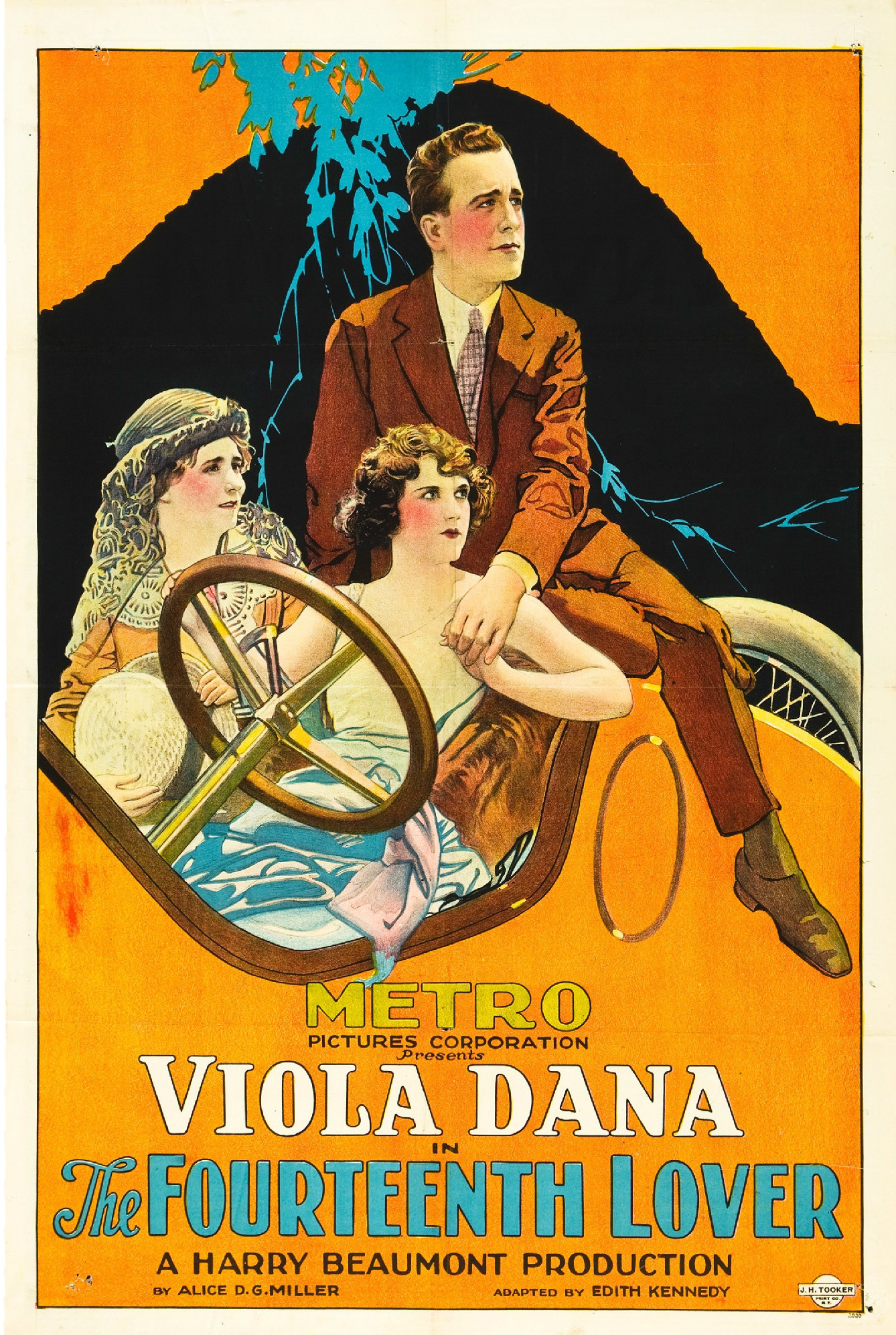
- Theatrical poster
- Directed by: Harry Beaumont
- Written by: Edith Kennedy
- Starring: Viola Dana
- Cinematography: John Arnold
- Distributed by: Metro Pictures
- Release date: January 9, 1922
- Running time: 5 reels
- Country: United States
- Language: Silent (English intertitles)

The Fourteenth Lover is a surviving 1922 American silent comedy film directed by Harry Beaumont and starring Viola Dana. It was produced and distributed by Metro Pictures.

== Plot ==
As described in a film magazine, Vi (Dana), daughter of the wealthy Mr. Marchmont (Vroom), has grown weary of her thirteen home-grown suitors and decides to turn to their gardener, Richard Hardy (Mulhall). Richard is a handsome but exceedingly stupid gardener who supports his aged mother (Lee) by trimming wealthy people's bushes. However, he has no use for society ladies who cannot cook or sew. Vi throws herself at his feet and learns how to cook to please him, but he is unimpressed. Her society friends tell lies about Richard to her. She goes to his home and compels him to keep her there all night so that he will be forced to marry her. This ends happily when he "consents" to this plan.

== Cast ==
- Viola Dana as Vi Marchmont
- Jack Mulhall as Richard Hardy
- Theodore von Eltz as Clyde Van Ness
- Kate Lester as Aunt Letitia
- Alberta Lee as Mrs. Hardy
- Frederick Vroom as Mr. Marchmont
- Fronzie Gunn as Maid

== Preservation status ==
A print of The Fourteenth Lover is preserved by MGM.
