= Hoodoo Ann =

1916 film by Lloyd Ingraham

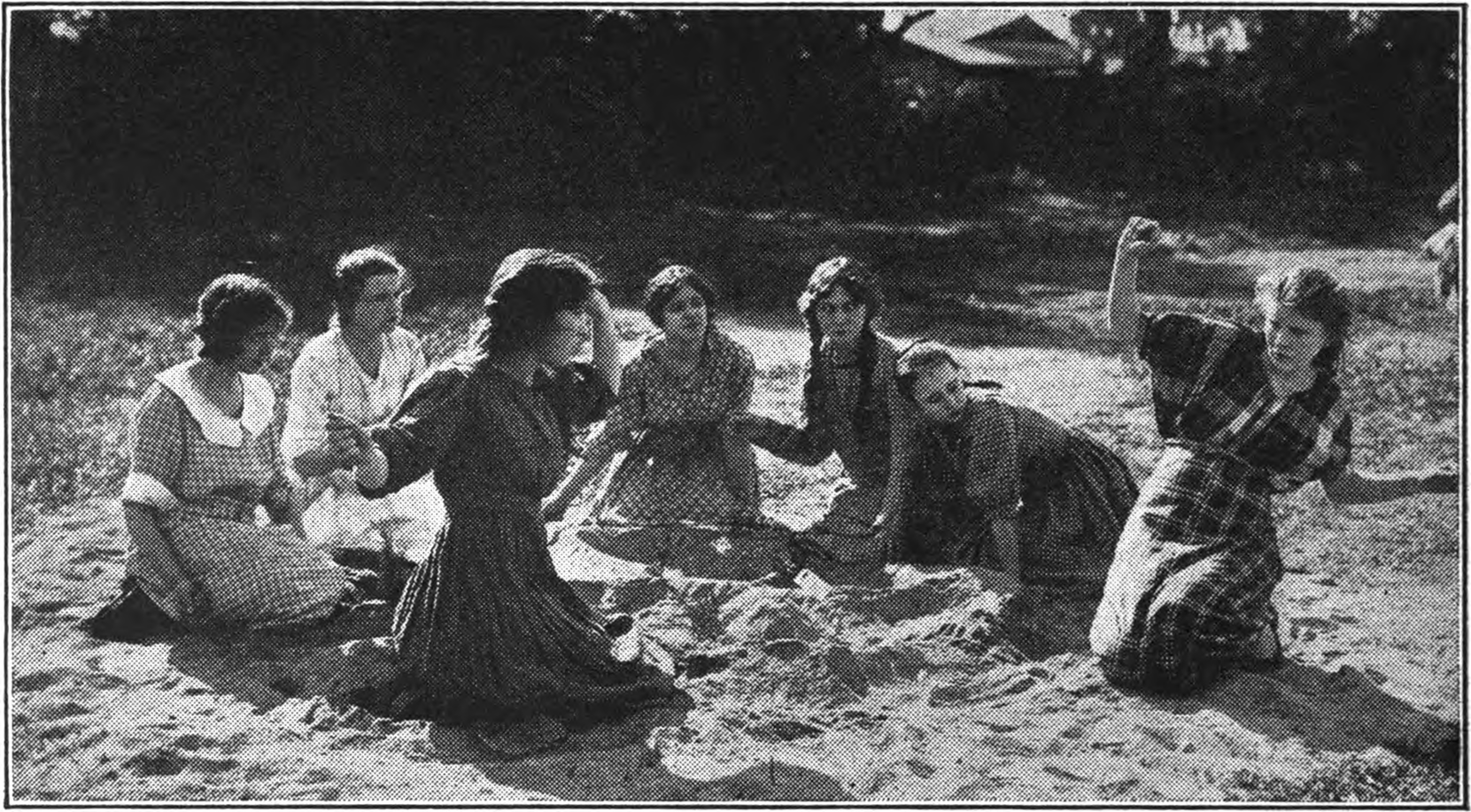
- Mildred Harris and Mae Marsh in scene from film
- Directed by: Lloyd Ingraham
- Written by: D. W. Griffith (screenplay)
- Produced by: D. W. Griffith
- Starring: Mae Marsh; Robert Harron; William H. Brown; Wilbur Higby; Loyola O'Connor; Mildred Harris
- Distributed by: Triangle Film Corporation
- Release date: March 26, 1916
- Running time: 64 minutes
- Country: United States
- Languages: Silent film English intertitles

Hoodoo Ann

Hoodoo Ann is a 1916 American comedy-drama silent film, written by D.W. Griffith, directed by Lloyd Ingraham and released by Triangle Film Corporation.

== Plot ==
Ann (Mae Marsh) is a young girl who has lived in an orphanage since infancy. She is disliked and spurned by the other children, and treated coldly by the orphanage administrators. She is told by the orphanage cook Black Cindy (Madame Sul-Te-Wan) during a palm reading that she will be cursed until she is married. Ann's stay at the orphanage is an endless series of unhappy circumstances: she steals a doll belonging to a popular girl named Goldie (Mildred Harris), then accidentally breaks the doll, thereby adding to her loneliness and misery. One day, while the children are napping, a fire breaks out in the orphanage and Ann heroically saves Goldie from the flames.

Impressed with Ann's selflessness, a kindly couple, Samuel and Elinor Knapp (Wilbur Higby and Loyola O'Connor) take her in and later adopt Ann. Ann is immediately smitten with a neighbour boy named Jimmie Vance (Robert Harron) and the two youths begin courting. Believing that her curse is coming to an end, Ann attends a motion picture with Jimmie. Enthralled by the action-filled Western film, the following day Ann imitates the film's main character Pansy Thorne while playing with a gun. Unbeknownst to Ann, the gun is loaded and a round goes off, entering a neighbour's house. Ann tentatively peers through the window and is shocked to see her neighbour, Bill Higgins (Charles Lee) lying on the floor. Believing him dead, Ann is despondent, sure that the curse is still upon her and fearful that Jimmie will never marry her now that she has committed murder.

After tearfully confessing to her "crime" and a subsequent investigation into the peculiar disappearance of the body of Mr Higgins, the town is shocked when Mr Higgins returns home several days later and reveals that he had simply left town to avoid his wife's incessant nagging. Overjoyed, Jimmie and Ann marry and the "hoodoo" is lifted. But the wedding ceremony is not entirely a happy affair – Ann appears distracted and pensive throughout, leaving the viewer to wonder if she perhaps believes that the curse is still upon her.

== Cast ==
Role	Actor
Hoodoo Ann	Mae Marsh
Jimmie Vance	Robert Harron
Wilson Vance	William H. Brown
Samuel Knapp	Wilbur Higby
Elinor Knapp	Loyola O'Connor
Goldie	Mildred Harris
Miss Prudence Scraggs	Pearl Elmore
Sarah Higgins	Anna Dodge
Bill Higgins	Charles Lee
Officer Lambert	Elmo Lincoln
Constable Drake	Carl Stockdale
Black Cindy	Madame Sul-Te-Wan

== Critical reception ==
The Moving Picture World gave it an unenthusiastic review for its theatrical release: "'Hoodoo Ann' has some amusement and Mae Marsh is in it, but it is so obviously a manufactured story, the kind we write at the studio, that the initial characterization, very promising in its way, is lost sight of in the badly-arranged structure and an apparent abandonment of original purpose... Mae Marsh and an occasional bright subtitle may life the picture over, but it could not get far without their aid."
