= Out of the Darkness (1915 film) =

1915 American film directed by George Melford

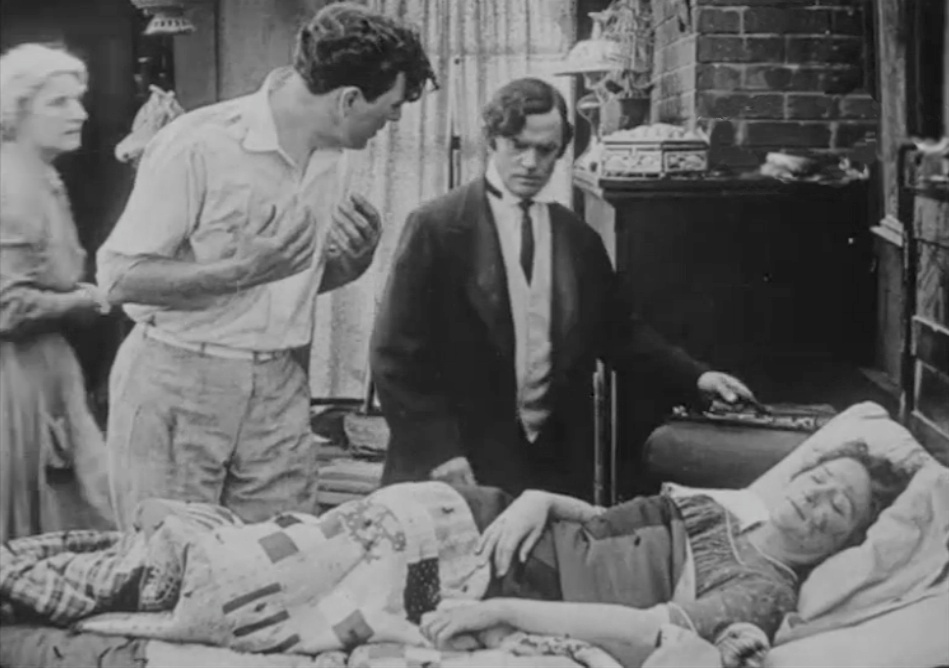
- Scene from the film
- Directed by: George Melford
- Story by: Hector Turnbull
- Produced by: Jesse L. Lasky
- Starring: Charlotte Walker; Thomas Meighan; Marjorie Daw; Hal Clements; Tom Forman; Loyola O'Connor
- Production company: Jesse L. Lasky Feature Play Company
- Distributed by: Paramount Pictures
- Release date: September 9, 1915
- Country: United States
- Language: Silent (English intertitles)

Out of the Darkness is a 1915 American silent drama film directed by George Melford and written by Hector Turnbull. The film stars Charlotte Walker, Thomas Meighan, Marjorie Daw, Hal Clements, Tom Forman and Loyola O'Connor. The film was released on September 9, 1915, by Paramount Pictures.

== Plot ==
The owner of a large cannery (Charlotte Walker) employs many women and children in horrible working conditions. She refuses to see the manager (Thomas Meighan) who wants to try to get better conditions for the employees. She hits her head and ends up forgetting who she is. She ends up working at the cannery with the manager (who doesn't recognize her). The workers finally revolt and tie up the manager in a burning factory and the owner, who fell in love with him, suddenly remembers everything because of the shock of the situation. After rescuing him, she tries to make everything right again.

== Cast ==
- Charlotte Walker as Helen Scott
- Thomas Meighan as Harvey Brooks
- Marjorie Daw as Jennie Sands
- Hal Clements as John Scott
- Tom Forman as Tom Jameson
- Loyola O'Connor as Mrs. Sands

== Preservation status ==
The film is preserved at EYE Institut (aka Filmmuseum Amsterdam).
