= Nancy from Nowhere =

1922 film by Chester M. Franklin

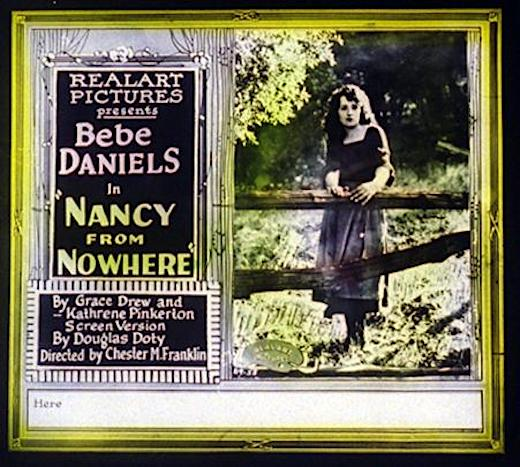
- Lantern slide
- Directed by: Chester Franklin
- Written by: Katherine Pinkerton; Douglas Z. Doty (adaptation)
- Based on: Spring Fever by Grace Drew Brown
- Starring: Bebe Daniels
- Cinematography: George J. Folsey
- Production company: Realart Pictures Corporation
- Distributed by: Realart Pictures Corporation
- Release date: January 22, 1922
- Running time: 50 minutes; 5 reels
- Country: United States
- Language: Silent (English intertitles)

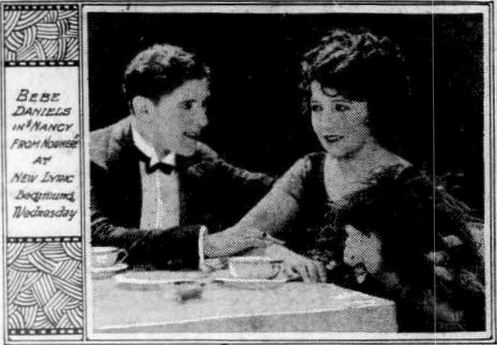
Newspaper advertisement with Eddie Sutherland and Bebe Daniels

Nancy from Nowhere is a 1922 American silent romantic comedy film directed by Chester Franklin and starring Bebe Daniels. It was produced and distributed by Realart Pictures through Paramount Pictures.

== Plot ==
As described in a film magazine, Jack Halliday discovers Nancy, a poor young mountain woman, being mistreated by her foster parents, Mr. and Mrs. Kelly. He takes her to the city where she blossoms into a society bud. However, Nancy returns to her mountain hut because she does not want to ruin his prospects socially by marrying him. Jack follows her back and finds her in the clutches of a villain, which he whips and then runs off with Nancy to the nearest parson to be wed.

== Cast ==
- Bebe Daniels as Nancy
- Eddie Sutherland as Jack Halliday
- Vera Lewis as Mrs. Kelly
- James Gordon as Mr. Kelly
- Myrtle Stedman as Mrs. Halliday
- Alberta Lee as Martha
- Helen Holly as Elizabeth Doane
- Dorothy Hagan as Mrs. Doane

== Preservation ==
With no prints of Nancy from Nowhere located in any film archives, it is a lost film.
