= Old Dad =

1920 film

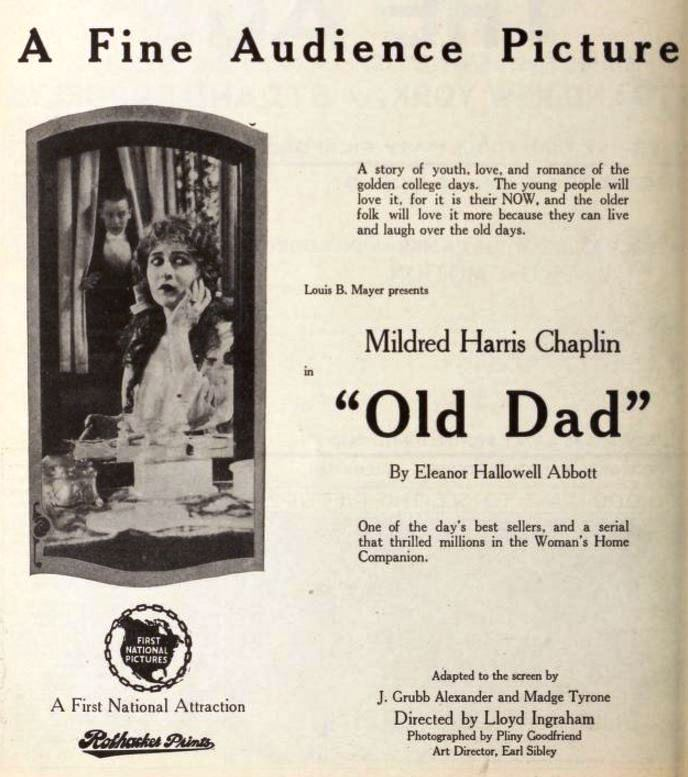
- Trade advertisement
- Directed by: Lloyd Ingraham
- Screenplay by: J. Grubb Alexander
- Based on: Old Dad by Eleanor Hallowell Abbott
- Produced by: Louis B. Mayer
- Starring: Mildred Harris; John St. Polis; Myrtle Stedman; Irving Cummings; Hazel Howell; Loyola O'Connor
- Cinematography: Pliny Goodfriend
- Production company: Chaplin-Mayer Pictures Company
- Distributed by: Associated First National Pictures
- Release date: November 1920
- Running time: 50 minutes
- Country: United States
- Language: Silent (English intertitles)

Old Dad is a 1920 American drama film directed by Lloyd Ingraham and written by J. Grubb Alexander. It is based on the 1919 novel Old Dad by Eleanor Hallowell Abbott. The film stars Mildred Harris, John St. Polis, Myrtle Stedman, Irving Cummings, Hazel Howell, and Loyola O'Connor. The film was released in November 1920, by Associated First National Pictures.

== Cast ==
- Mildred Harris as Daphne Bretton
- John St. Polis as Jeffrey Bretton
- Myrtle Stedman as Virginia Bretton
- Irving Cummings as Sheridan Kaire
- Hazel Howell as Peggy Laine
- Loyola O'Connor as Claudia Merriwane
- Bess Mitchell as Bess Pomeroy
- Tula Belle as Little Girl with Two Mothers
