= The Penitentes =

1915 film by Jack Conway

- Directed by: Jack Conway
- Written by: Mary H. O'Connor (scenario)
- Based on: novel, The Penitentes by R. Ellis Wales
- Produced by: D. W. Griffith
- Starring: Orrin Johnson; Seena Owen
- Music by: Joseph Carl Breil
- Distributed by: Triangle Film Corporation
- Release date: December 26, 1915
- Running time: 50 minutes
- Country: USA
- Language: Silent. English intertitles

The Penitentes is a lost 1915 silent film drama directed by Jack Conway and starring Orrin Johnson and Seena Owen. It was produced by D. W. Griffith's Fine Arts Film Company and distributed through Triangle Film Corporation.

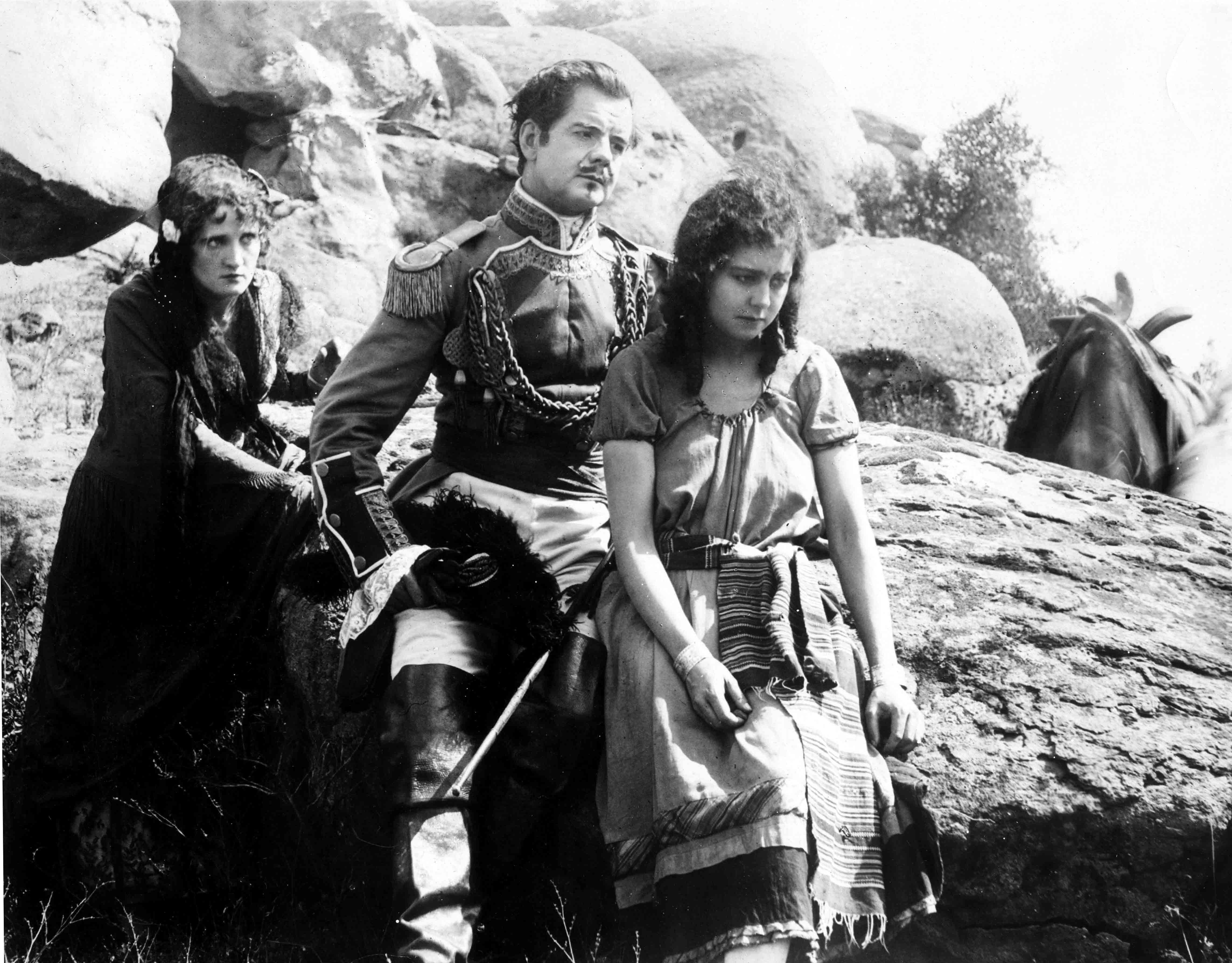
Paul Gilmore as Colonel Juan Banca in the only known surviving still from The Penitentes

== Cast ==
- Orrin Johnson - Manuel
- Seena Owen - Dolores
- Paul Gilmore - Colonel Juan Banca
- Irene Hunt - Senorita Carmelia
- Josephine Crowell - Carmelia's Mother
- F. A. Turner - Father Rossi
- Charles Clary - Father David
- Allan Sears - The Chief Brother (*A. D. Sears)
- Dark Cloud - Indian Chief
