= Alberta Lee =

American actress

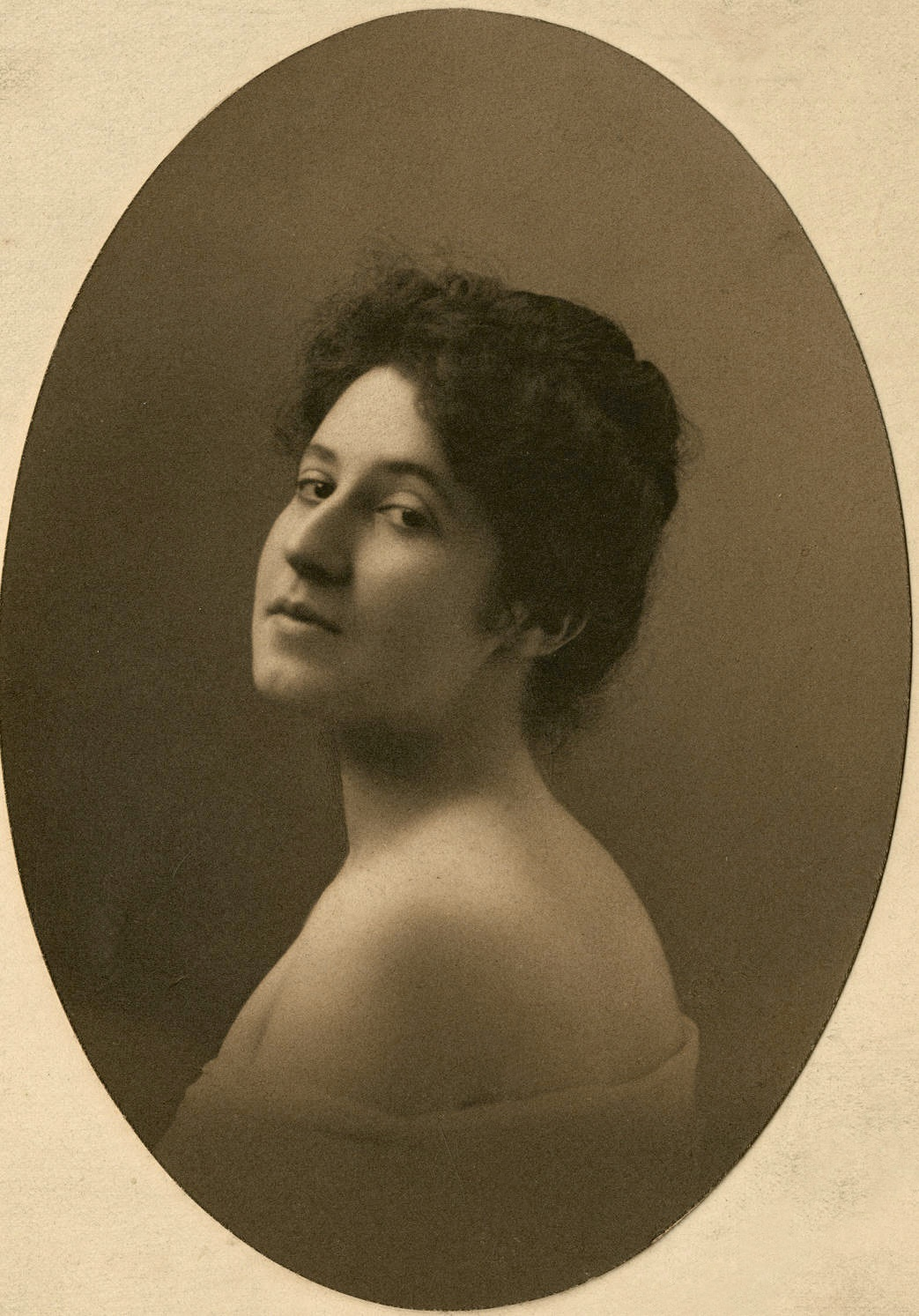
- Alberta Lee in 1907
- Born: March 21, 1860; Cleveland, Ohio, United States
- Died: November 12, 1928 (aged 68); Hollywood, California, United States
- Occupation: Actress
- Years active: 1915–1923 (film)

Alberta Lee (1860–1928) was an American stage and film actress of the silent era. In 1915, she appeared as Mary Todd Lincoln in The Birth of a Nation.

== Selected filmography ==
- The Birth of a Nation (1915)
- Reggie Mixes In (1916)
- A Sister of Six (1916)
- The Children of the Feud (1916)
- The Little Yank (1917)
- The Fuel of Life (1917)
- An Old-Fashioned Young Man (1917)
- Alias Mary Brown (1918)
- The Painted Lily (1918)
- False Ambition (1918)
- Limousine Life (1918)
- The Man Who Woke Up (1918)
- The Wishing Ring Man (1919)
- The Red Viper (1919)
- Prudence on Broadway (1919)
- The Road to Divorce (1920)
- Rouge and Riches (1920)
- The Butterfly Man (1920)
- The Cheater (1920)
- Live Wires (1921)
- Not Guilty (1921)
- The Light in the Clearing (1921)
- The Magnificent Brute (1921)
- The Little Minister (1922)
- The Fourteenth Lover (1922)
- Nancy from Nowhere (1922)
- Watch Your Step (1922)
- The Love Letter (1923)

== Bibliography ==
- Munden, Kenneth White. The American Film Institute Catalog of Motion Pictures Produced in the United States, Part 1. University of California Press, 1997.
- Reinhart, Mark S. Abraham Lincoln on Screen: Fictional and Documentary Portrayals on Film and Television. McFarland, 2009.
- Solomon, Aubrey. The Fox Film Corporation, 1915-1935: A History and Filmography. McFarland, 2011.
