= Rudolph Valentino filmography =

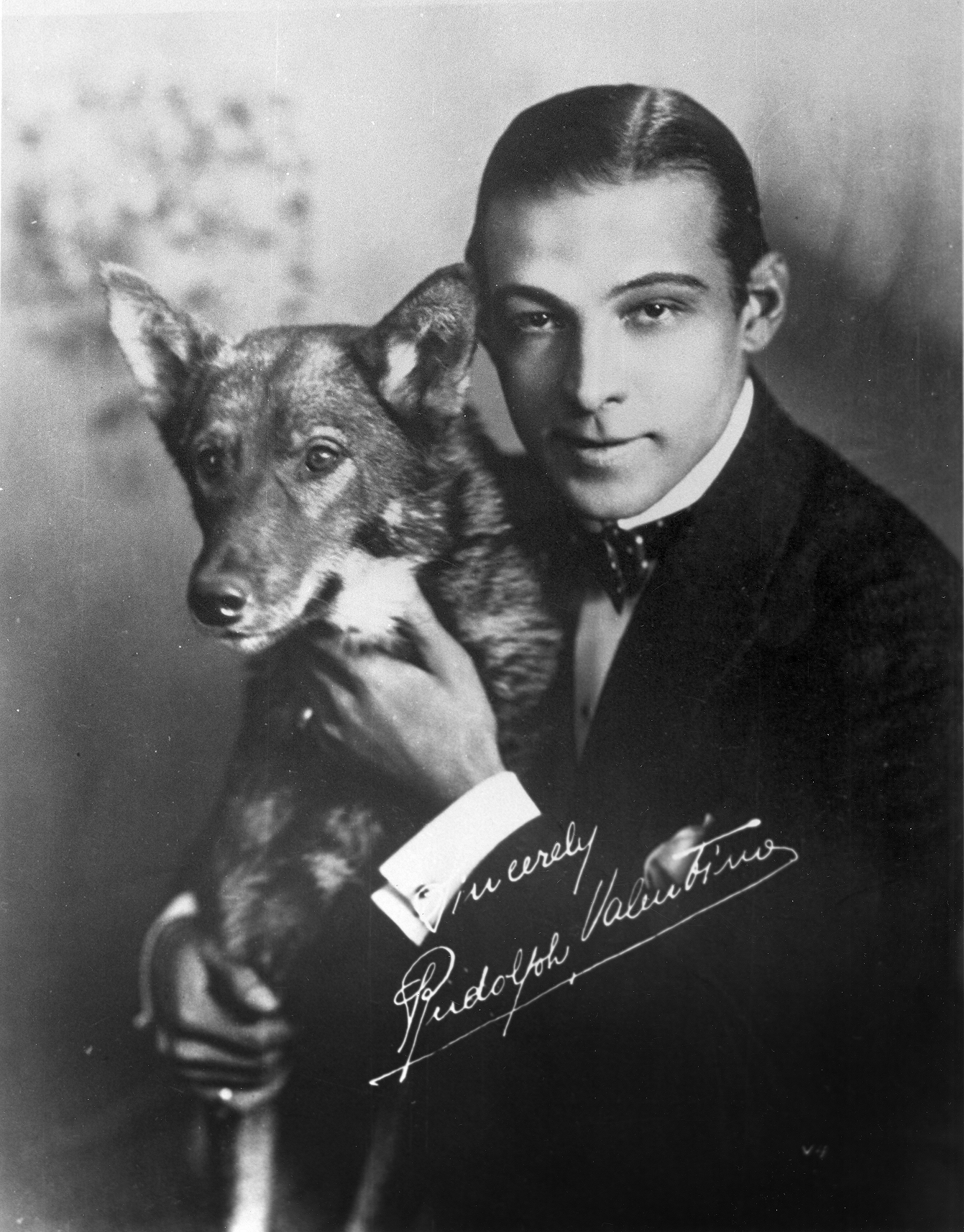
Publicity photograph of Rudolph Valentino and his dog

Rudolph Valentino (1895–1926) was an Italian-born actor who became one of the most prominent stars of the American silent film era. His screen career spanned from uncredited appearances in short films in the mid-1910s to major starring roles that helped define the romantic leading man of the 1920s. He made 35 films in total 19 extant, 3 incomplete and 13 lost.

Valentino was alleged to have appeared as an extra in an early film by D. W. Griffith. Some writers have tentatively identified a shadowy figure in a still from The Battle of the Sexes (1914) as Valentino. However, according to two Griffith scholars, the film was a hastily produced "quickie," shot over four or five days in December 1913. As Valentino did not arrive in New York from Italy until December 23, 1913, his involvement is considered unlikely. Moreover, Valentino never mentioned meeting Griffith during his early years in New York in interviews or autobiographical writings, which further casts doubt on the claim.

He was also alleged to have appeared as an uncredited extra in My Official Wife (1914), according to Albert E. Smith, head of Vitagraph Studios, who claimed that Valentino approached him and was cast. The assertion cannot be independently verified, and Smith’s later recollections have been treated with skepticism by historians due to inaccuracies in other claims.

While still dancing in New York, Valentino appeared in a few uncredited film roles, including The Quest of Life(1916) and Seventeen (1916). After he moved to California, he devoted more time to acting, and he had bit roles in several films between 1917 and 1920—many of which are now lost. In 1921, he got his major break when he appeared in the role of Julio in The Four Horsemen of the Apocalypse. According to Valentino's biographer, Noel Botham, the film was "hailed ... [as] a masterpiece and Valentino as a star"; the film grossed $4.5 million at the North American box office.

Valentino played leading roles in fourteen films as a romantic figure. His status as a sex symbol was cemented with his appearance in The Sheik (1921), which reportedly prompted women to faint in theater aisles and grossed $1.5 million. Valentino’s second wife, Natacha Rambova, assumed increasing influence over his career and public image, a shift that some contemporaries and critics felt rendered his screen persona "increasingly effeminate." The films in which he played a romantic role within the action genre were the more successful at the box office; these included his final two works The Eagle (1925) and The Son of the Sheik (1926).

Valentino died suddenly of peritonitis on August 23, 1926, at the age of 31. His death at the height of his fame and extensive media coverage turned his funeral into a national event, at which large crowds attended. According to his biographer, Carl Rollyson, Valentino had a "... trim body, athletic grace, and dark good looks [which] made him an action hero and a romantic legend—the epitome of the silent screen's Latin lover".

In 1995, The Four Horsemen of the Apocalypse was inducted into the United States National Film Registry by the Library of Congress as being "culturally, historically, or aesthetically significant"; a second Valentino film was inducted in 2003 when The Son of the Sheik was selected.

== Filmography ==
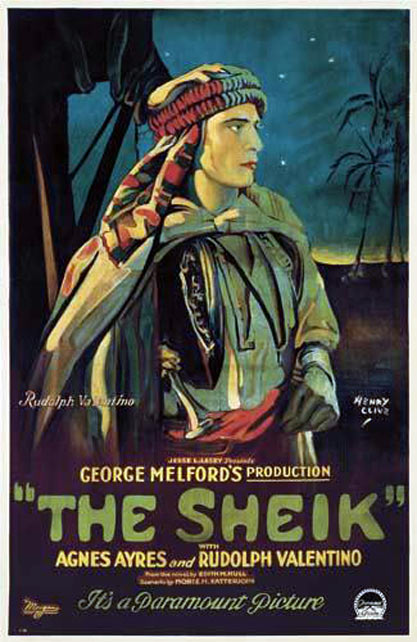
Poster for the 1921 film, The Sheik

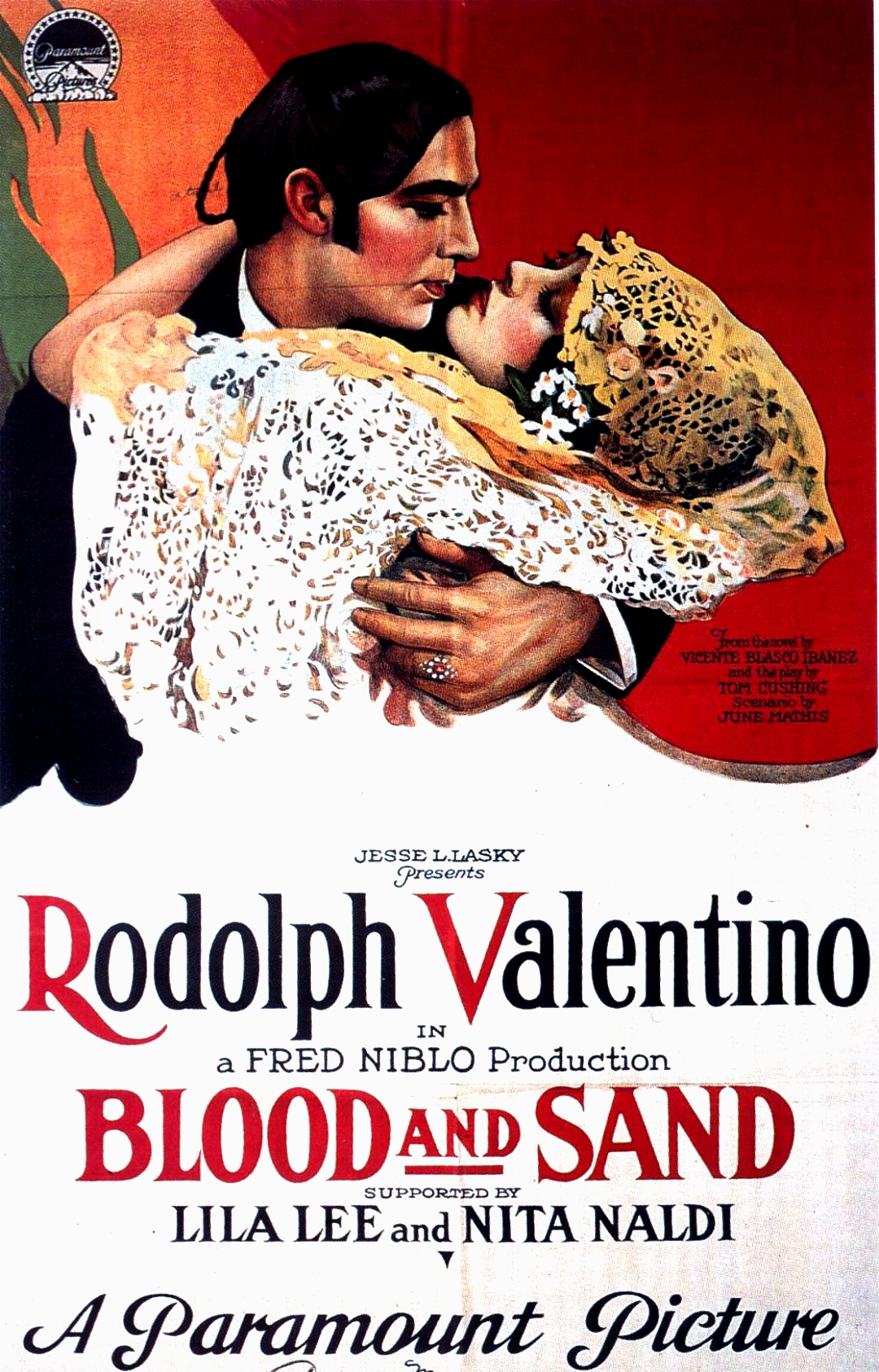
Poster for the 1922 film, Blood and Sand

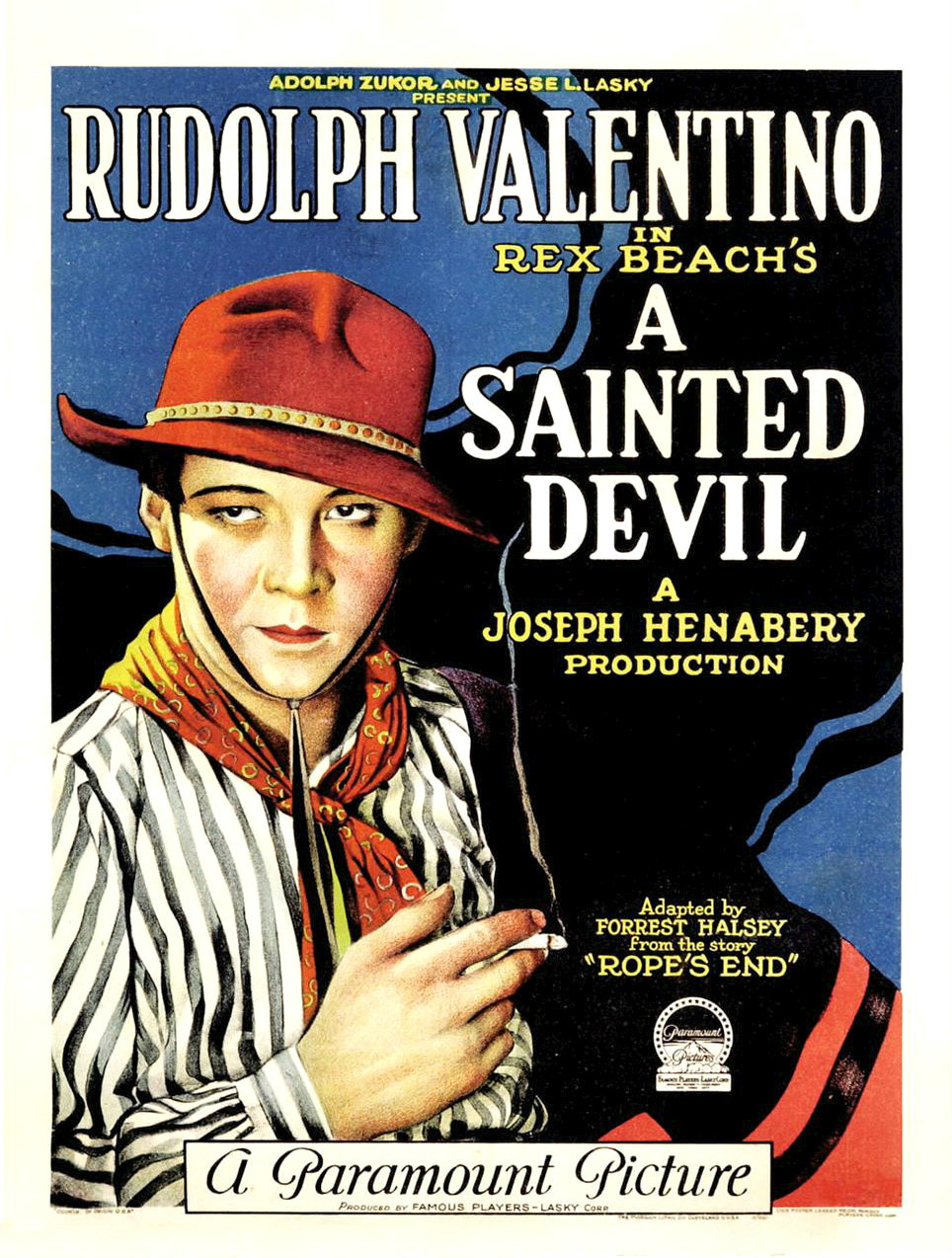
Poster for the 1924 film, A Sainted Devil

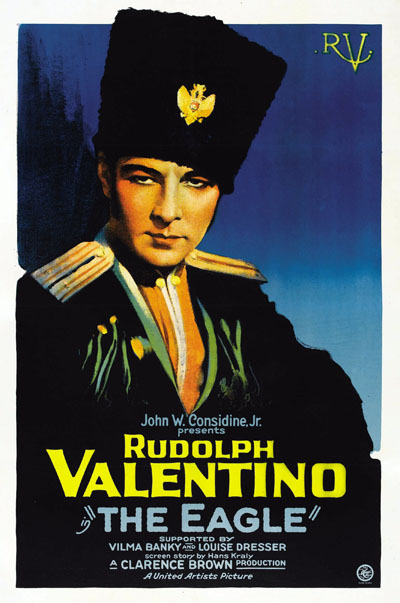
Poster for the 1925 film, The Eagle

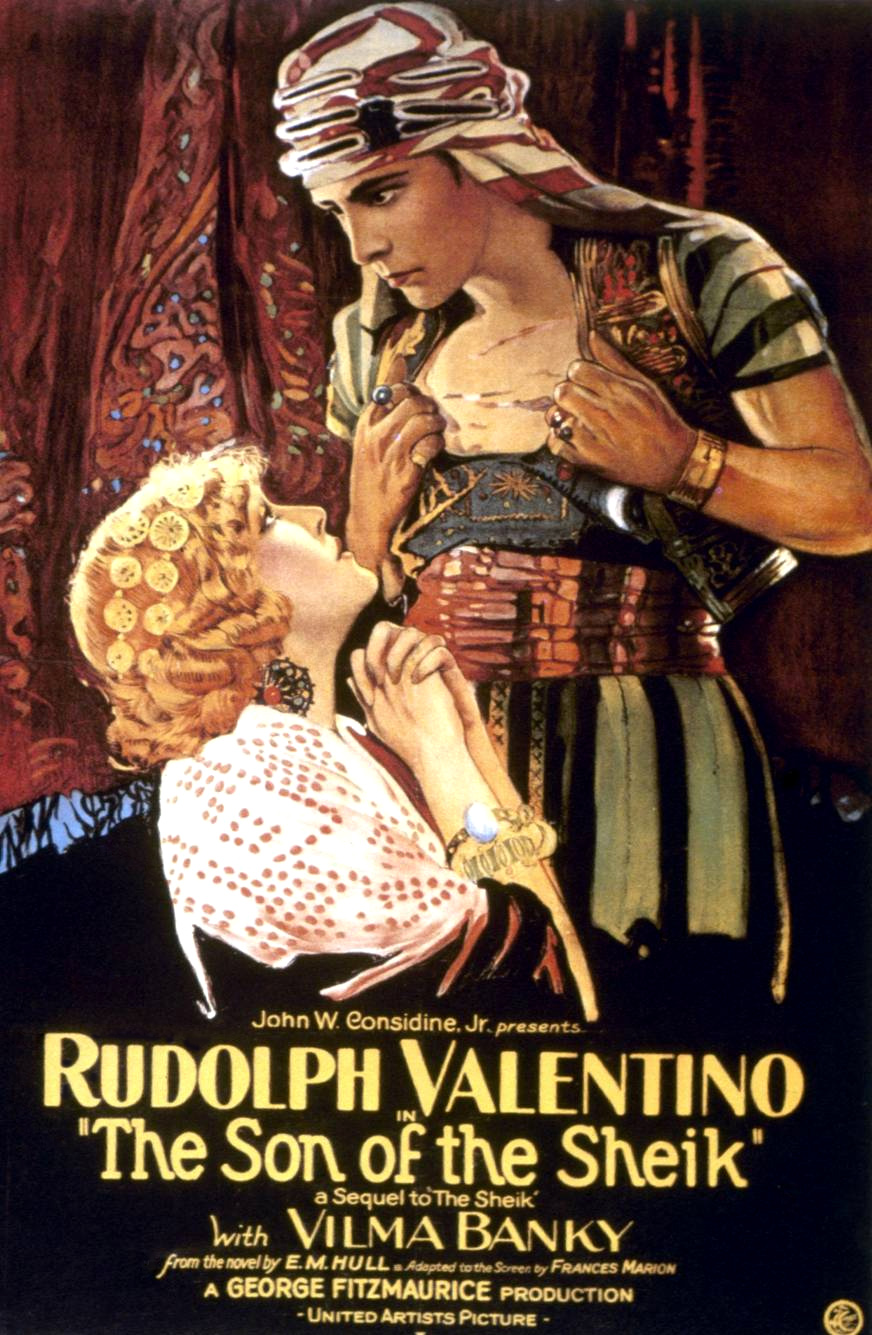
Poster for the 1926 film, The Son of the Sheik

Year	Title	Role	Credited as	Notes	Ref.
1916	The Quest of Life	Extra	Uncredited	Lost film	
1916	The Foolish Virgin	Extra	Uncredited	Lost film	
1916	Seventeen	Extra	Uncredited	Lost film	
1917	Alimony	Dancer	Uncredited	Lost film	
1917	Patria	Extra	Rudolph Valentino	Incomplete	
1918	A Society Sensation	Dick Bradley	Rodolpho De Valentina	Lost film (original version) Survives (1924 re-release)	
1918	All Night	Richard Thayer	Rodolfo di Valentina	Survives	
1918	The Married Virgin	Count Roberto di San Fraccini	Rodolfo di Valentini	Survives	
1919	The Delicious Little Devil	Jimmy Calhoun	Rudolpho De Valintine	Survives	
1919	The Big Little Person	Arthur Endicott	Rodolpho De Valentina	Lost film	
1919	A Rogue's Romance	Apache dancer	Rudolph Volantino	Lost film	
1919	The Homebreaker	Dance extra	Uncredited	Lost film	
1919	Virtuous Sinners	Bit part	Rodolfo di Valentini	Survives	
1919	Out of Luck/Nobody Home	Maurice Rennard	Rodolph Valentine	Lost film	
1919	Eyes of Youth	Clarence Morgan	Rudolfo Valentino	Survives	
1920	Stolen Moments	Jose Dalmarez	Rudolph Valentine	Lost film (original version) Survives (1922 re-release)	
1920	An Adventuress	Jacques Rudanyi	Rodolph Valentino	Survives	
1920	The Cheater	Extra	Rudolph Valentino	Lost film	
1920	Passion's Playground	Prince Angelo Della Robbia	Rudolph Valentine	Lost film	
1920	Once to Every Woman	Juliantimo	Rudolph Valentino	Lost film	
1920	The Wonderful Chance	Joe Klingsby	Rudolph de Valentino	Survives	
1921	The Four Horsemen of the Apocalypse	Julio Desnoyers	Rudolph Valentino	Survives	
1921	Uncharted Seas	Frank Underwood	Rudolph Valentino	Lost film	
1921	The Sheik	Sheik Ahmed Ben Hassan	Rudolph Valentino	Survives	
1921	The Conquering Power	Charles Grandet	Rudolph Valentino	Survives	
1921	Camille	Armand Duval	Rudolph Valentino	Survives	
1922	Moran of the Lady Letty	Ramon Laredo	Rodolph Valentino	Survives	
1922	Beyond the Rocks	Lord Bracondale	Rodolph Valentino	Survives	
1922	Blood and Sand	Juan Gallardo	Rudolph Valentino	Survives	
1922	The Young Rajah	Amos Judd	Rudolph Valentino	Incomplete	
1924	Monsieur Beaucaire	Duke de Chartres/Beaucaire	Rudolph Valentino	Survives	
1924	A Sainted Devil	Don Alonzo Castro	Rudolph Valentino	Lost film	
1925	Cobra	Count Rodrigo Torriani	Rudolph Valentino	Survives	
1925	The Eagle	Lt. Vladimir Dubrovsky	Rudolph Valentino	Survives	
1926	The Son of the Sheik	Ahmed/The Sheik	Rudolph Valentino	Survives	

== References and sources ==
=== Sources ===
- Botham, Noel (2002). Valentino: The First Superstar. London: Metro Books. ISBN 978-1-84358-013-3.
- Browne, Ray Broadus; Browne, Pat (2001). The Guide to United States Popular Culture. Madison, WI: The University of Wisconsin Press. ISBN 978-0-87972-821-2.
- Ellenberger, Allan R. (2005). The Valentino Mystique: The Death and Afterlife of the Silent Film Idol. Jefferson, NC: McFarland & Company. ISBN 978-0-7864-8341-9.
- International Motion Picture Almanac 1937–38. New York, NY: The Quigley Publishing Company. 1938. OCLC 900904412.
- LaGumina, Salvatore J.; Cavaioli, Frank J.; Primeggia, Salvatore; Varacalli, Joseph A. (2003). The Italian American Experience: An Encyclopedia. New York, NY: Routledge. ISBN 978-1-135-58333-0.
- Leider, Emily W (2004). Dark Lover: The Life and Death of Rudolph Valentino. London: Faber and Faber. ISBN 978-0-571-21819-6.
- Rambova, Natacha (2009). Rudolph Valentino: A Wife's Memories of an Icon. Hollywood, Cal.: 1921 PVG Publishing. ISBN 978-0-9816440-4-2.
- Rollyson, Carl (2000). "Valentino, Rudolph". American National Biography. Oxford University Press. (subscription required)
