= Claire Sutherland =

Claire Sutherland may refer to:

- Claire Sutherland, character in Altars of Desire
- Claire Sutherland, editor of mX (newspaper)
