= Elizabeth Lane (disambiguation) =

Elizabeth Lane was an English barrister and judge.

Elizabeth Lane may also refer to:

- Libby Lane (Elizabeth Jane Holden Lane) (born 1966), Church of England bishop
- Elizabeth Lane, fictional character from the film All Night
