= Trimmed =

1922 film

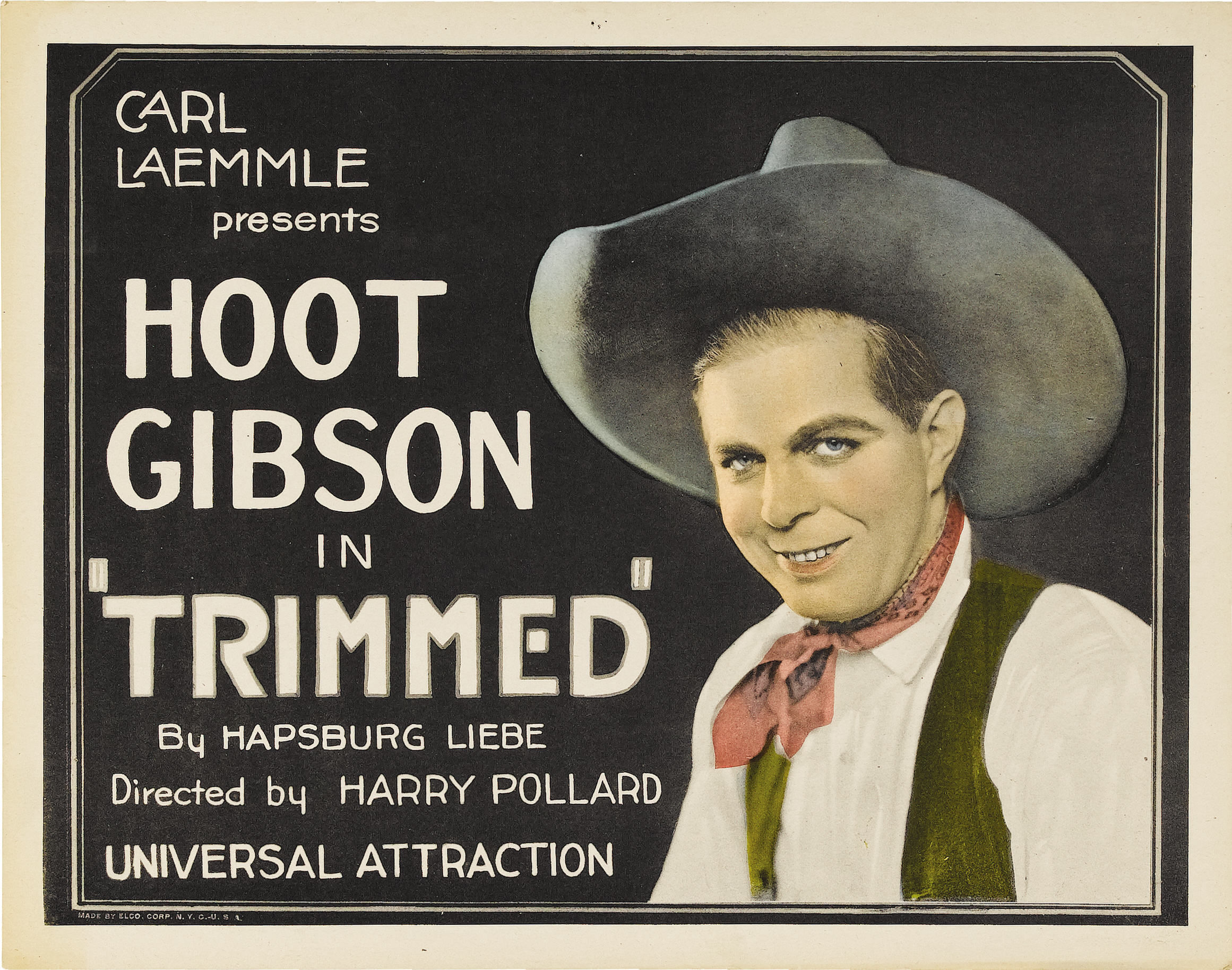
- Poster for film
- Directed by: Harry A. Pollard
- Written by: Wallace Clifton; Hapsburg Liebe; Arthur F. Statter
- Starring: Hoot Gibson
- Cinematography: Sol Polito
- Distributed by: Universal Film Manufacturing Company
- Release date: July 3, 1922
- Running time: 50 minutes
- Country: United States
- Languages: Silent; English intertitles

Trimmed is a 1922 American silent Western film directed by Harry A. Pollard and featuring Hoot Gibson. It is not known whether the film currently survives, and it may be a lost film.

== Cast ==
- Hoot Gibson as Dale Garland
- Patsy Ruth Miller as Alice Millard
- Alfred Hollingsworth as John Millard
- Fred Kohler as Young Bill Young
- Otto Hoffman as Nebo Slayter
- Dick La Reno as Judge William Dandridge

== See also ==
- Hoot Gibson filmography
