= The Broad Road =

1923 film

- Directed by: Edmund Mortimer
- Screenplay by: Edmund Mortimer
- Story by: Hapsburg Liebe
- Starring: Richard Travers; May Allison; Ben Hendricks Jr. D.J. Flanagan; Mary Foy; Charles McDonald
- Cinematography: William S. Cooper; Orestes A. Zangrilli
- Production company: Associated Authors
- Distributed by: Associated First National Pictures
- Release date: September 1, 1923
- Running time: 60 minutes
- Country: United States
- Language: English

The Broad Road is a 1923 American drama film written and directed by Edmund Mortimer. The film stars Richard Travers, May Allison, Ben Hendricks Jr., D.J. Flanagan, Mary Foy and Charles McDonald. The film was released on September 1, 1923, by Associated First National Pictures.

== Cast ==
- Richard Travers as 'Ten Spot' Tifton
- May Allison as Mary Ellen Haley
- Ben Hendricks Jr. as Bud Ashley
- D.J. Flanagan as Jim Fanning
- Mary Foy as Ma Fanning
- Charles McDonald as Sheriff Bill Emmett
- Emile La Croix as Old Fuzzy Lippert
- Roy Kelly as Kid Coppins
- Alicia Collins as Mrs. Lippert
