= Monte Carlo (1926 film) =

1926 film by Christy Cabanne

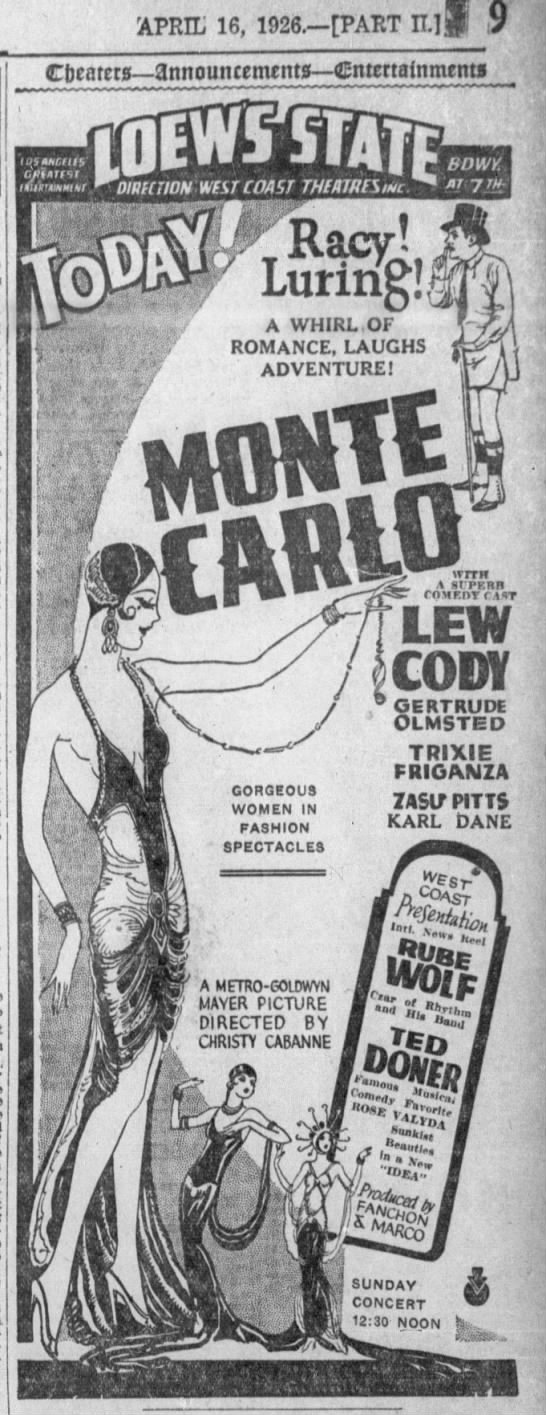
- Directed by: Christy Cabanne
- Written by: Alice D. G. Miller; Carey Wilson
- Produced by: Louis B. Mayer; Irving Thalberg
- Starring: Lew Cody; Gertrude Olmstead
- Cinematography: William H. Daniels
- Edited by: William Le Vanway
- Music by: Ernö Rapée
- Distributed by: Metro-Goldwyn-Mayer
- Release date: March 1, 1926
- Running time: 7 reels
- Country: United States
- Language: Silent (English intertitles)

Monte Carlo is a 1926 American silent romantic comedy film directed by Christy Cabanne and starring Lew Cody. It was produced by and distributed through Metro-Goldwyn-Mayer.

== Plot ==
As described in a film magazine review, three young small town women, Flossie, Hope, and Sally, the last a pretty school teacher; win a popularity contest and a trip to Monte Carlo. Arriving there, Sally accidentally becomes acquainted with Tony Townsend of New York when he hides from pursuing detectives in her hotel room. Tony has had bad luck financially, and to escape his creditors he assumes the identity of Prince Boris. Tony declares his love for Sally, is jailed as an imposter, but is then released through the intervention of the real Prince Boris. Tony leaves for home accompanied by Sally.

== Cast ==
- Lew Cody as Tony Townsend
- Gertrude Olmstead as Sally Roxford
- Roy D'Arcy as Prince Boris
- Karl Dane as The Doorman
- ZaSu Pitts as Hope Durant
- Trixie Friganza as Flossie Payne
- Margaret Campbell as Grand Duchess Marie
- André Lanoy as Ludvig
- Max Barwyn as Sarleff
- Barbara Shears as Princess Ilene
- Harry Myers as Greves
- Cesare Gravina as Count Davigny
- Tony D'Algy as Varo
- Arthur Hoyt as Bancroft
- Margie Angus as Second Page at Fashion Show (uncredited)
- Mary Angus as Page at Fashion Show (uncredited)

== Production ==
Portions of the film were in two-strip Technicolor including a fashion show.

== Preservation ==
A print of Monte Carlo is preserved in the Metro-Goldwyn-Mayer film library.

== See also ==
- List of early color feature films
