= Alice D. G. Miller =

American screenwriter (1894–1985)

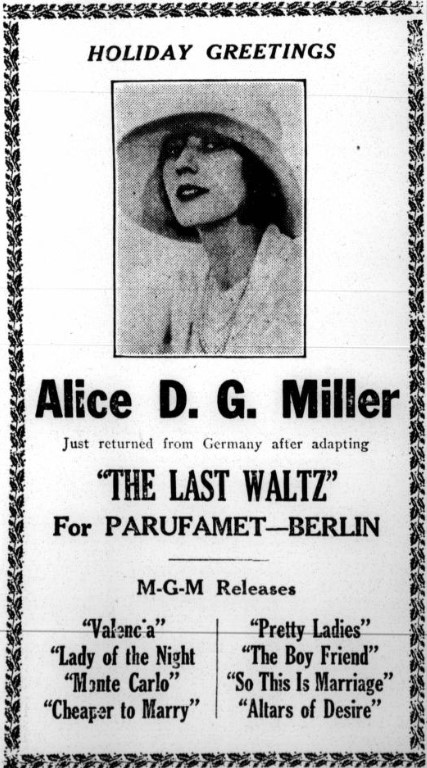
- 1926 holiday greetings
- Born: Alice Dorothea Georgianna Miller; June 28, 1894; Milwaukee, Wisconsin, U.S.
- Died: July 24, 1985 (aged 91); Los Angeles, California, U.S.
- Occupation: Screenwriter
- Years active: 1922-1952

Alice Dorothea Georgianna Miller (June 28, 1894 – July 24, 1985) was an American screenwriter. She was sometimes erroneously credited as Alice Duer Miller, another writer of no relation.

== Biography ==
Miller was born in Milwaukee, Wisconsin, 1894, to Robert Miller and Louise Haas. Her parents divorced when she was young, and she grew up with her mother and brother in Milwaukee. Her first job was as a secretary to a businessman in town.

In 1919, she and her mother arrived in Hollywood, and soon she had found work writing film scenarios. During the 1920s through the 1930s, she was credited on dozens of motion pictures, and was under contract for much of that time at Samuel Goldwyn Studios (later Metro-Goldwyn-Mayer), and briefly at Paramount Pictures. Her work was in demand, and a number of studios vied to get her work.

During World War II, she enlisted in the Women's Army Corps.

== Partial filmography ==
- Red Lights (1923)
- Slave of Desire (1923)
- So This Is Marriage? (1924)
- Cheaper to Marry (1925)
- Pretty Ladies (1925)
- Monte Carlo (1926)
- The Exquisite Sinner (1926)
- The Boy Friend (1926)
- Valencia (1926)
- Dance Madness (1926)
- Altars of Desire (1927)
- Man, Woman, and Sin (1927)
- The Devil Dancer (1927)
- Man-Made Women (1928)
- Two Lovers (1928)
- Four Walls (1928)
- The Bridge of San Luis Rey (1929)
- Disgraced! (1933)
- Rose-Marie (1936)
- The Girl on the Front Page (1936)
- On Borrowed Time (1939)
- Tangier (1946)
