= Disgraced! =

1933 film

- Directed by: Erle C. Kenton
- Screenplay by: Francis Martin; Alice D. G. Miller
- Produced by: Bayard Veiller
- Starring: Helen Twelvetrees; Bruce Cabot; Adrienne Ames; William Harrigan; Ken Murray; Charles Middleton; Adrienne D'Ambricourt
- Cinematography: Karl Struss
- Music by: John Leipold
- Production company: Paramount Pictures
- Distributed by: Paramount Pictures
- Release date: July 7, 1933
- Running time: 66 minutes
- Country: United States
- Language: English

Disgraced! is a 1933 American pre-Code mystery film directed by Erle C. Kenton and written by Francis Martin and Alice D. G. Miller. The film stars Helen Twelvetrees, Bruce Cabot, Adrienne Ames, William Harrigan, Ken Murray, Charles Middleton and Adrienne D'Ambricourt. The film was released on July 7, 1933, by Paramount Pictures.

== Cast ==
- Helen Twelvetrees as Gay Holloway
- Bruce Cabot as Kirk Undwood Jr.
- Adrienne Ames as Julia Thorndyke
- William Harrigan as Captain Holloway
- Ken Murray as Jim McGuire
- Charles Middleton as District Attorn
- Adrienne D'Ambricourt as Madame Maxime
- Ara Haswell as Miss Peck
- Dorothy Bay as Flynn
