= Four Walls (film) =

1928 film by William Nigh

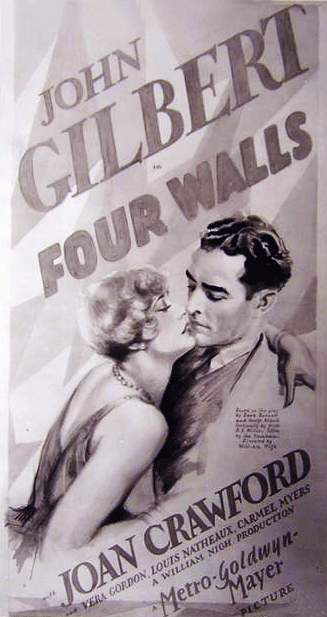
- Directed by: William Nigh
- Written by: Alice D. G. Miller; Joseph Farnham (titles)
- Screenplay by: George Abbott
- Based on: Four Walls by George Abbott and Dana Burnet
- Starring: John Gilbert; Joan Crawford; Vera Gordon; Carmel Myers
- Cinematography: James Wong Howe
- Edited by: Harry Reynolds
- Distributed by: Metro-Goldwyn-Mayer
- Release date: August 11, 1928
- Running time: 60 minutes
- Country: United States
- Languages: Silent; English intertitles
- Budget: $255,000

Four Walls is a 1928 American silent drama film directed by William Nigh and starring John Gilbert, Joan Crawford, and Carmel Myers. The film is based on the play of the same name by George Abbott and Dana Burnet. Four Walls is now considered lost. The film was remade in 1934 as Straight Is the Way.

== Plot ==
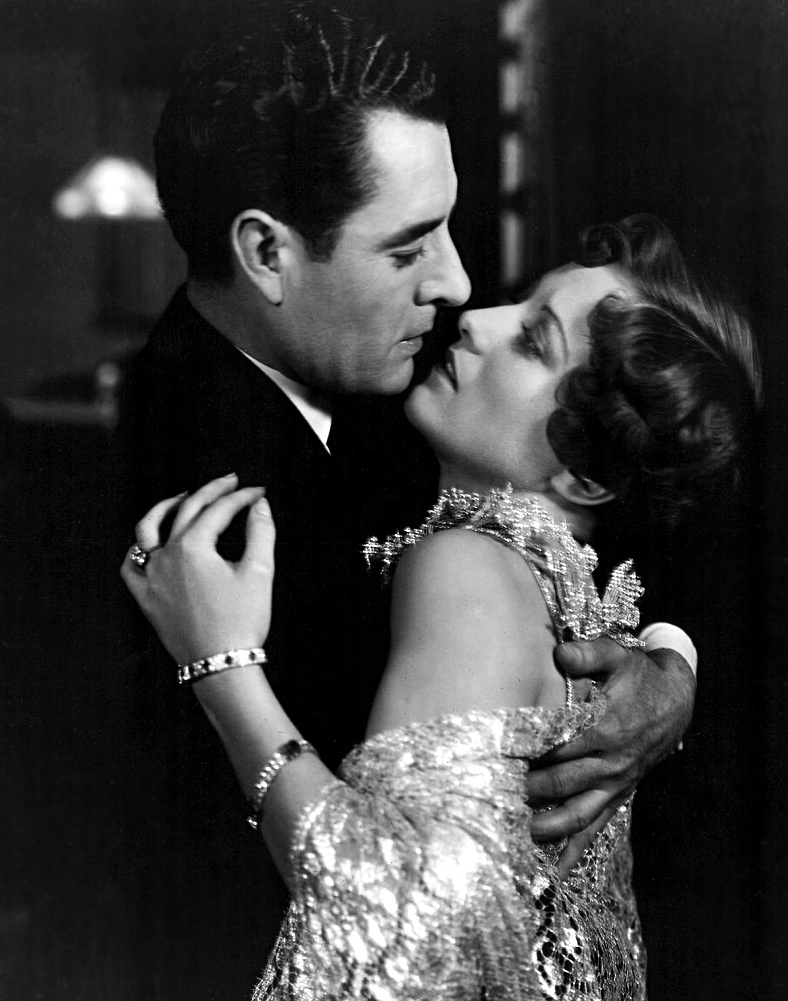
John Gilbert and Joan Crawford in Four Walls

Benny Horowitz, a reformed gangster, proposes marriage to Bertha, a neighbor who had been a frequent visitor while he served his sentence. Bertha rejects his proposal because she believes that he is still in love with Freida, Benny's former gun moll. During a party in which Freida seeks to make Benny jealous with a former rival, Benny again takes control of the gang's leadership. After his rival's death is ruled accidental, Benny and Bertha go off together and start a new life.

== Cast ==
- John Gilbert - Benny
- Joan Crawford - Frieda
- Vera Gordon - Benny's Mother
- Carmel Myers - Bertha
- Robert Emmett O'Connor - Sullivan
- Louis Natheaux - Monk
- Jack Byron - Duke Roma

== Preservation ==
- The film currently is lost.
