= Kornblum =

Kornblum is a surname, and may refer to:

- Allan Kornblum (1938–2010), American judge
- Allan Kornblum (publisher) (1949–2014), American poet and independent publisher
- I. B. Kornblum (1895–1996; né Isadore Benjamin Kornblum), American composer, lawyer, and pianist
- John C. Kornblum (1943–2023), American diplomat and businessman
- Lori Kornblum, American lawyer and judge from Wisconsin
- Nathan Kornblum (1914–1993), American organic chemist
- Ronald Kornblum (1933–2008), American coroner

== See also ==
- Kornblum oxidation, chemical reaction of a primary halide with dimethyl sulfoxide (DMSO) to form an aldehyde
- Kornblum–DeLaMare rearrangement, rearrangement reaction in which a primary or secondary organic peroxide is converted to the corresponding ketone and alcohol under base catalysis
- Boris Korenblum (1923–2011), Soviet-Israeli-American mathematician
