= Dance Madness =

1926 film

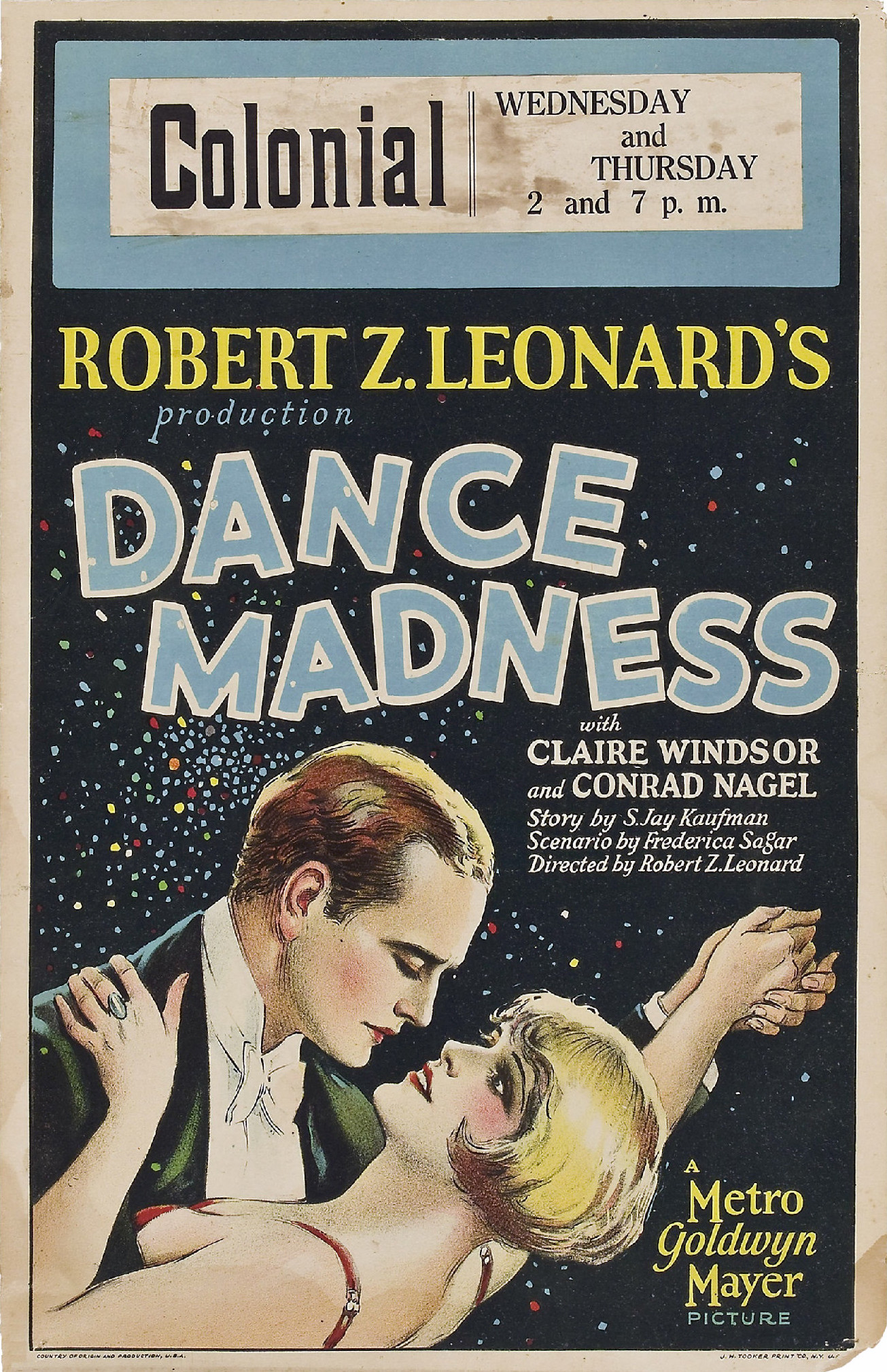
- Theatrical poster
- Directed by: Robert Z. Leonard
- Written by: Frederica Sagor
- Starring: Claire Windsor; Conrad Nagel; Hedda Hopper
- Cinematography: John Arnold; William H. Daniels
- Edited by: William LeVanway
- Distributed by: Metro-Goldwyn-Mayer
- Release date: January 4, 1926
- Running time: 70 mins.
- Country: United States
- Language: Silent (English intertitles)

Dance Madness is a 1926 American silent comedy film directed by Robert Z. Leonard based upon a script by Frederica Sagor. The film starred Claire Windsor, Conrad Nagel, and Hedda Hopper.

According to the credited screenwriter, Frederica Sagor, Dance Madness was "patently a rewrite" of The Guardsman, a work by Ferenc Molnár that was later directly adapted for film. Sagor notes the screenplay was not written by her, but by Alice D. G. Miller, and she only provided script rewrites.

== Plot ==
As described in a film magazine review, Roger Halladay weds May Russell, a former dancer. He becomes infatuated with Valentina, the notorious masked Russian dancer. May discovers that Valentina's husband is Strokoff, who taught her dancing. The two women unite to teach Roger a lesson. May, always masked, poses as Valentina while trying to seduce Roger and arranges to have Strokoff find them while they are embracing. Roger runs away, followed by his masked charmer until he discovers that she is his wife and they are reconciled.

== Cast ==
- Conrad Nagel as Roger Halladay
- Claire Windsor as May Russell
- Hedda Hopper as Valentina
- Douglas Gilmore as Bud
- Mario Carillo as Strokoff
- Elmo Billings
- Estelle Clark as Minor Role (uncredited)
- Joyzelle Joyner as Dancer (uncredited)
- Belva McKay as Minor Role (uncredited)

== Preservation ==
Dance Madness is now considered to be a lost film.
