= Hapsburg Liebe =

American screenwriter

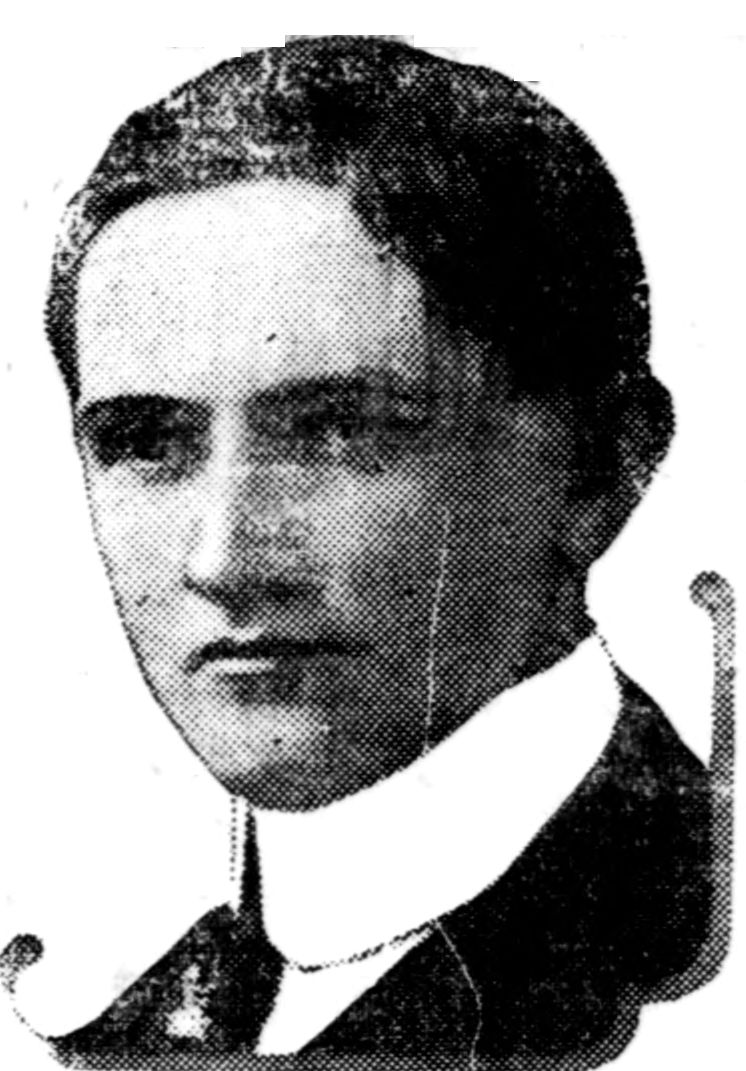
Hapsburg Liebe

Hapsburg Liebe, born Charles Haven Liebe, (1880–1957) was an American author and screenwriter. His stories were published in Adventure, The Black Cat, The Railroad Trainman, The Green Book Magazine, Boys' Life and Florida Wildlife.

Liebe grew up in the mountains of East Tennessee. He served in the Philippines during the Spanish-American War. During the First World War Liebe was accused of being a German writer because of his name. Liebe denied this, and stated that his ancestors were Dutch and English Americans. Liebe later did propaganda writing for the U.S. military as part of the group of writers known as The Vigilantes.

== Bibliography ==
- The Clan Call

== Filmography ==
- Circumstantial Evidence (1912) based on Liebe's story "The Little Good"
- A Society Sensation (1918) (disputed; the American Film Institute 1918 film entry attributes the story to Perley Poore Sheehan, as does the onscreen credit in the shortened 1924 re-release version.)
- The Everlasting Light (1922)
- Trimmed (1922)
- The Broad Road (1923)
