= The Last Hour (1923 film) =

1923 film

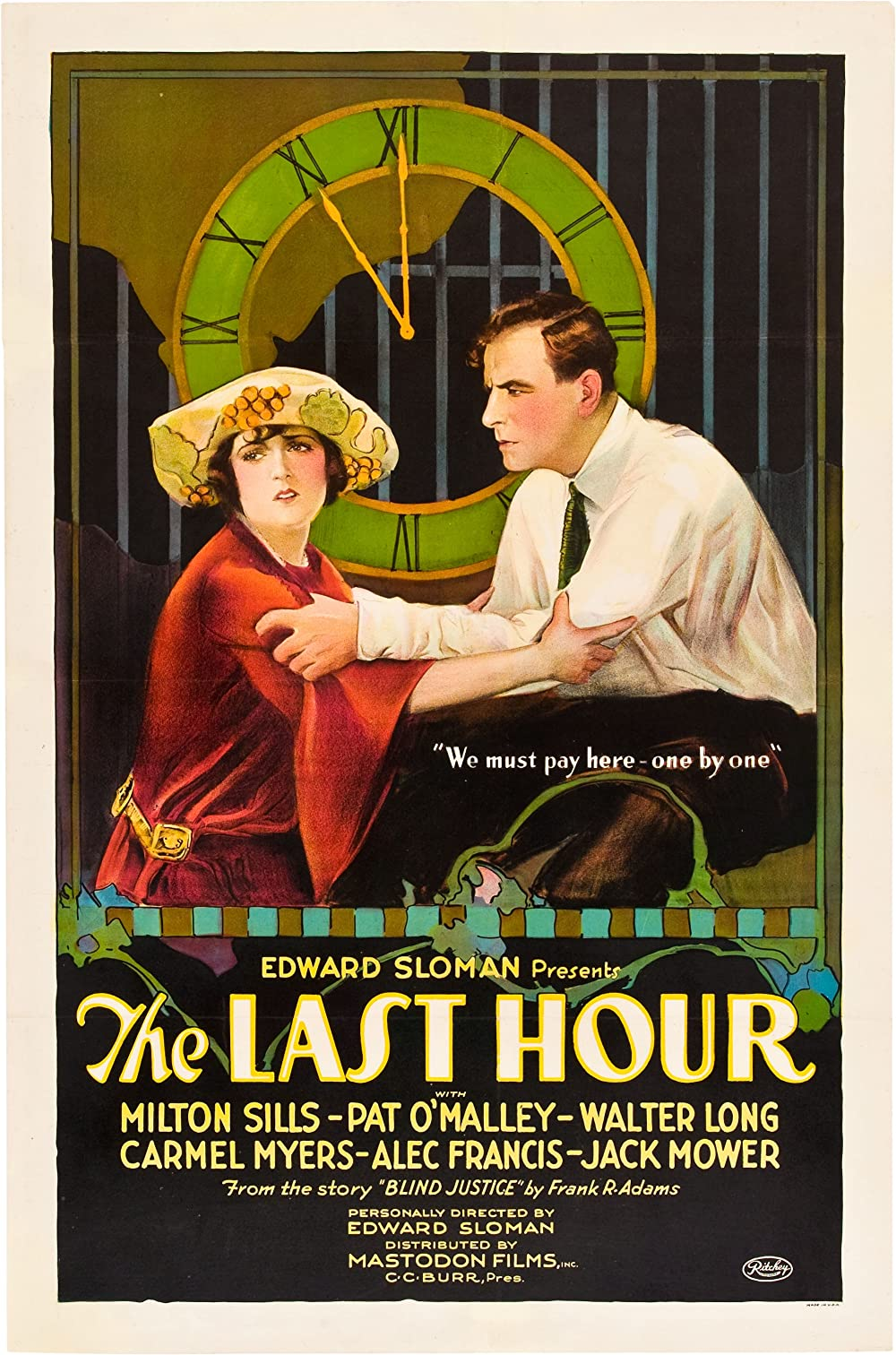
- Directed by: Edward Sloman
- Written by: Hylda Hollis
- Produced by: Edward Sloman; C.C. Burr
- Starring: Milton Sills; Carmel Myers; Pat O'Malley
- Cinematography: Max Dupont
- Production company: Mastodon Films
- Distributed by: Mastodon Films
- Release date: January 1, 1923
- Running time: 70 minutes
- Country: United States
- Languages: Silent; English intertitles

The Last Hour is a 1923 American silent crime film directed by Edward Sloman and starring Milton Sills, Carmel Myers and Pat O'Malley.

== Cast ==
- Milton Sills as Steve Cline
- Carmel Myers as Saidee McCall
- Pat O'Malley as Philip Logan
- Jack Mower as Tom Cline
- Alec B. Francis as Reever McCall
- Charles Clary as William Mallory
- Walter Long as Red Brown
- Eric Mayne as Gov. Logan
- Clarence Wilson as Quales
- Gary Cooper as Extra

== Bibliography ==
- Connelly, Robert B. The Silents: Silent Feature Films, 1910-36, Volume 40, Issue 2. December Press, 1998.
- Munden, Kenneth White. The American Film Institute Catalog of Motion Pictures Produced in the United States, Part 1. University of California Press, 1997.
