= I. B. Kornblum =

American composer, lawyer (1895–1996)

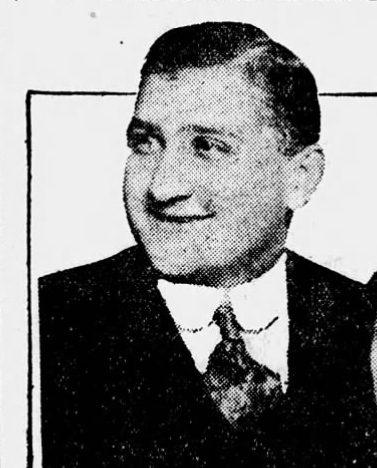
- Kornblum, c. 1923
- Born: Isadore Benjamin Kornblum; June 21, 1895; St. Louis, Missouri, U.S.
- Died: November 9 , 1996; Beverly Hills, California, U.S.
- Burial place: Hillside Memorial Park
- Other names: Isidore Benjamin Kornblum, Izzy Kornblum
- Occupations: Composer, playwright, pianist, lawyer, film producer, union organizer
- Spouse(s): Carmel Myers (m. 1919–1923; div.); Ann Beshon (m. 1926)
- Children: 2

Isadore Benjamin "I. B." Kornblum, also spelled as Isidore Benjamin Kornblum (June 21, 1895 – November 9 , 1996) was an American composer, playwright, pianist, lawyer, and union organizer.

== Life and career ==
I. B. Kornblum was born on June 21, 1895, in St. Louis, Missouri. He was Jewish. His family moved to Los Angeles County, California where his father was a land developer, and Kornblum Avenue in Hawthorne, California carries the family's name. While in high school he started writing musicals and performing the piano. He attended Los Angeles High School (class of 1913). His first professional performance was as a teenager in 1911 at the Hyman Theatre in Los Angeles, where he played the piano and sang popular songs of the time. Kornblum graduated in 1917 with a law degree from the University of California, Berkeley.

He moved to New York City after college, and became a playwright. He created three popular Broadway musicals titled “Chin Toy,” “Twinkle Toes”, and “Blue Eyes.” In New York City he lived at 161 Broome Street in the Lower East Side in the 1920s.

Kornblum was the lawyer for the Actors' Equity Association in Los Angeles. He represented singer Helen Morgan in 1934 for her lawsuit filed against film producer Myron C. Fagan for harassment.

== Personal life and death ==
He married film actress Carmel Myers in 1919. They divorced in 1923. His second marriage was to Ann Beshon in 1926, and they had a son and daughter.

He lived in Beverly Hills, California for 65 years before his death. He died at the age of 101 on November 9 , 1996, in his home in Beverly Hills.

== Stage ==
- Blue Eyes (1921), as writer and composer
- Patsy (ca. 1926), as writer and composer
- Waiting For Robert E. Lee (1933), as writer and composer

== Music ==
- Fight 'Em / Down from the North (1915), Kornblum as composer, H. E. Kowalski as lyricist; the University of California fight song, created about its rival the University of Washington created for the 1915 Big Game

== Filmography ==
- I Loved You Wednesday (1933), music
- Tucson (film) (1949), music
- The Man You Loved to Hate (1979), a documentary directed by Patrick Montgomery, about actor Erich von Stroheim, and Kornblum was an interviewee

== See also ==
- Kornblum
