= Pretty Ladies =

1925 film

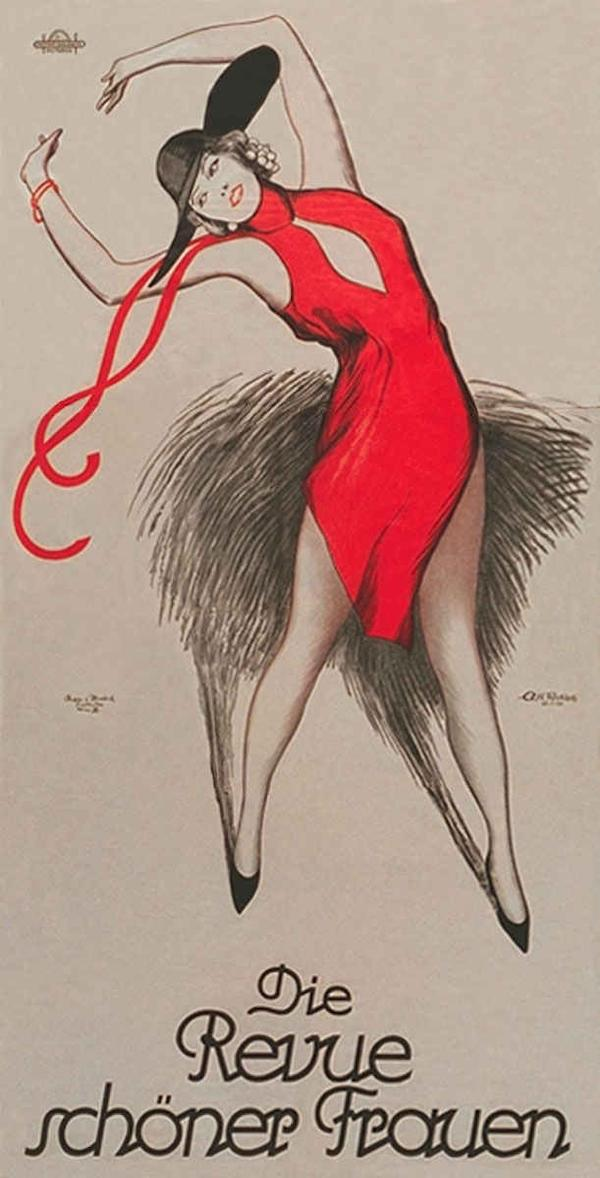
- German poster
- Directed by: Monta Bell
- Written by: Alice D. G. Miller; Joseph Farnham (Titles)
- Starring: ZaSu Pitts; Conrad Nagel; Tom Moore; Joan Crawford
- Cinematography: Ira H. Morgan
- Distributed by: Metro-Goldwyn-Mayer
- Release date: September 6, 1925
- Running time: 74 minutes
- Country: United States
- Language: Silent (English intertitles)

Pretty Ladies is a 1925 American silent comedy drama film starring ZaSu Pitts and released by Metro-Goldwyn-Mayer. The film is a fictional recreation of the famed Ziegfeld Follies. Directed by Monta Bell, the film was written by Alice D. G. Miller and featured intertitles by Joseph Farnham. Pretty Ladies originally featured musical color sequences, some in two-color Technicolor. However, the color sequences are now considered lost.

== Plot ==
As described in a film magazine reviews, Maggie, a homely but lovable musical comedy star yearns for love, a home, and children. She marries Al Cassidy, a happy-go-lucky fellow. Her happiness is complete at the birth of a baby. Her husband leaves on business and gets into trouble with another woman. A friend of Maggie’s informs her of this. When her husband begins to confess, she seals his lips, declaring everything untrue and foolish.

== Cast ==
- ZaSu Pitts as Maggie Keenan
- Tom Moore as Al Cassidy
- Ann Pennington as herself
- Lilyan Tashman as Selma Larson
- Bernard Randall as Aaron Savage
- Helena D'Algy as Adrienne
- Conrad Nagel as Maggie's Dream Lover
- Norma Shearer as Frances White
- George K. Arthur as Roger Van Horn
- Joan Crawford as Bobby, a Showgirl (credited as Lucille LeSueur)
- Paul Ellis as Warren Hadley
- Roy D'Arcy as Paul Thompson
- Gwen Lee as Fay
- Dorothy Seastrom as Diamond Tights
- Lew Harvey as Will Rogers
- Chad Huber as Frisco
- Walter Shumway as Mr. Gallagher
- Dan Crimmins as Mr. Shean
- James Quinn as Eddie Cantor (credited as Jimmie Quinn)
- Carole Lombard as Showgirl (uncredited)
- Myrna Loy as Ziegfeld Girl (uncredited)
- Bodil Rosing as Minor Role (uncredited)

== Production ==
The film was set in New York City shot at MGM Studios in Culver City, California. The film's sets were designed by the art directors James Basevi and Cedric Gibbons.

Pretty Ladies marked the first credited appearance of "Lucille Le Sueur", soon to be known as Joan Crawford. According to Lawrence J. Quirk, author of The Films of Joan Crawford, this film was the only time Crawford was credited by her real name (Crawford is also billed as LeSueur in the 1925 promotional film MGM Studio Tour). It was also one of the first screen appearances of Myrna Loy (then still performing under her real last name Williams), who signed a seven-year contract with Warner Bros. in 1925 and then finally signed with MGM where she became a star in 1934 with the release of The Thin Man.

== Censorship ==
Before Pretty Ladies could be exhibited in Kansas, the Kansas Board of Review required the removal of a close-up of a woman's legs under a table, a scene where a man is resting his head on a woman's lap, and scene of a fly on a dancing woman's thigh.

== See also ==
- List of early color feature films
