= Carmel Myers =

American actress (1899–1980)

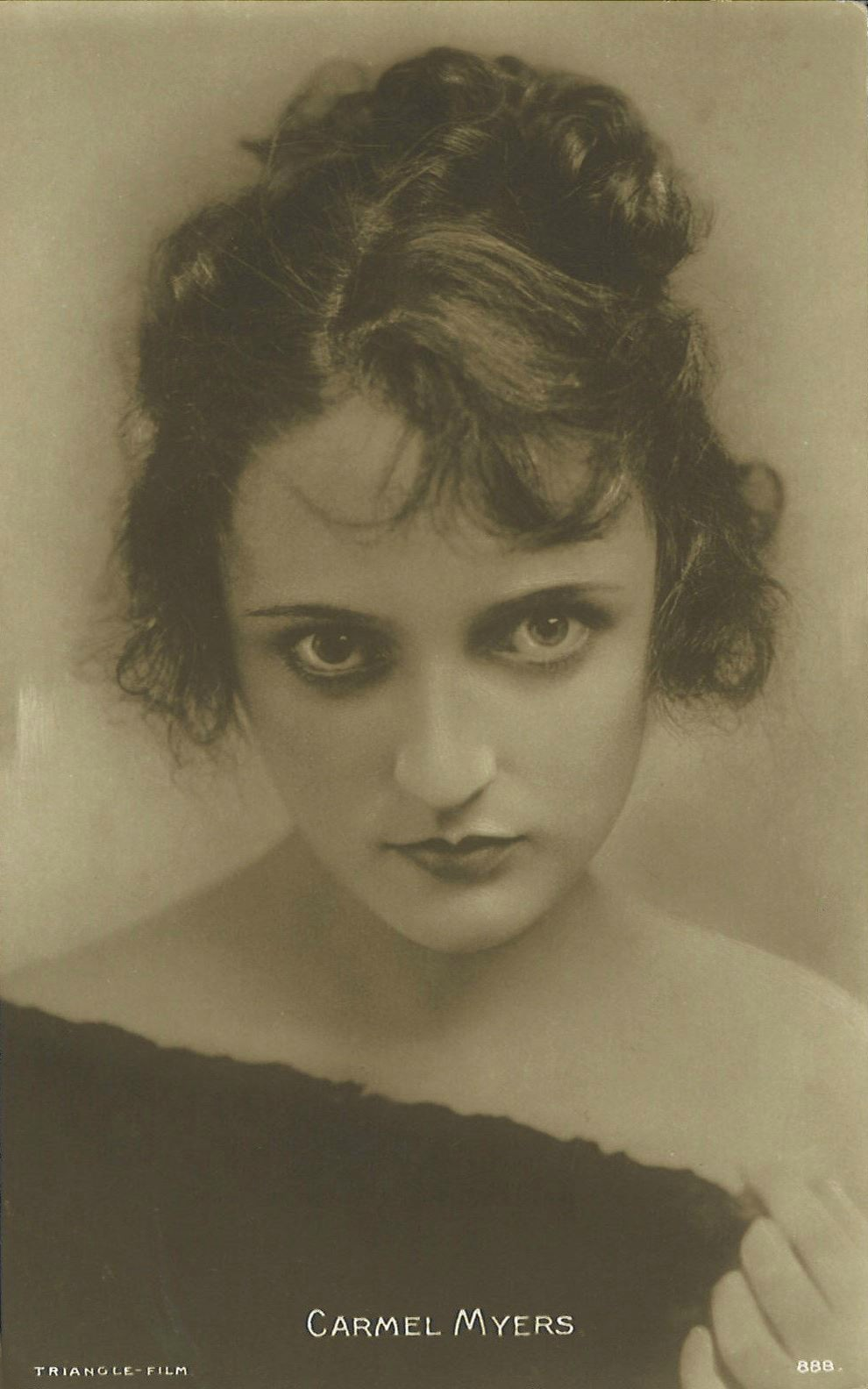
- Myers, c. 1917
- Born: April 9, 1899; San Francisco, California, U.S.
- Died: November 9, 1980 (aged 81); Los Angeles, California, U.S.
- Resting place: Home of Peace Cemetery
- Other names: Carmel Myers Blum; Carmel Schwalberg
- Years active: 1915–1976
- Spouses: Isadore B. Kornblum (m. 1919; div. 1923) Ralph H. Blum (m. 1929; died 1950) Alfred W. Schwalberg (m. 1951; died 1974)
- Children: 3
- Relatives: Ruth Harriet Louise (cousin); Mark Sandrich (cousin)

Carmel Myers (April 9, 1899 – November 9, 1980) was an American actress who achieved her greatest successes in silent film.

== Early life ==
Myers was born in San Francisco, the daughter of Isidore Myers, a Russian-Jewish rabbi who was born in Russia but raised in Australia, and Anna Jacobson Myers, an Austrian-Jew. She had an older brother, Zion, and she was a cousin of director Mark Sandrich and photographer Ruth Harriet Louise. Carmel's father was active in campaigns for women's suffrage, abolition of capital punishment, and zionism. He also was a noted scholar. The family moved to Los Angeles in 1905.

Myers attended Los Angeles High School but left after D. W. Griffith gave her bit part in the film Intolerance (1916), for which her father was an unpaid consultant. She continued her education at a school for young actors.

Myers helped her brother become a writer and director in Hollywood.

== Career ==
=== Silent film and theater ===
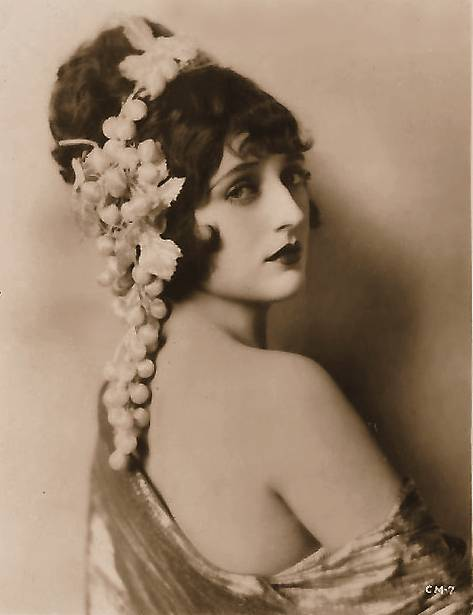
c. 1920

Myers left for New York City, where she acted mainly in theater for the next two years. She was signed by Universal, where she emerged as a popular actress in vamp roles. Her most popular film from this period—which does not feature her in a vamp role—is probably the romantic comedy All Night, opposite Rudolph Valentino, who was then a little-known actor. She also worked with him in A Society Sensation. By 1924, she was working for Metro-Goldwyn-Mayer, making such films as Broadway After Dark, which also starred Adolphe Menjou, Norma Shearer, and Anna Q. Nilsson.

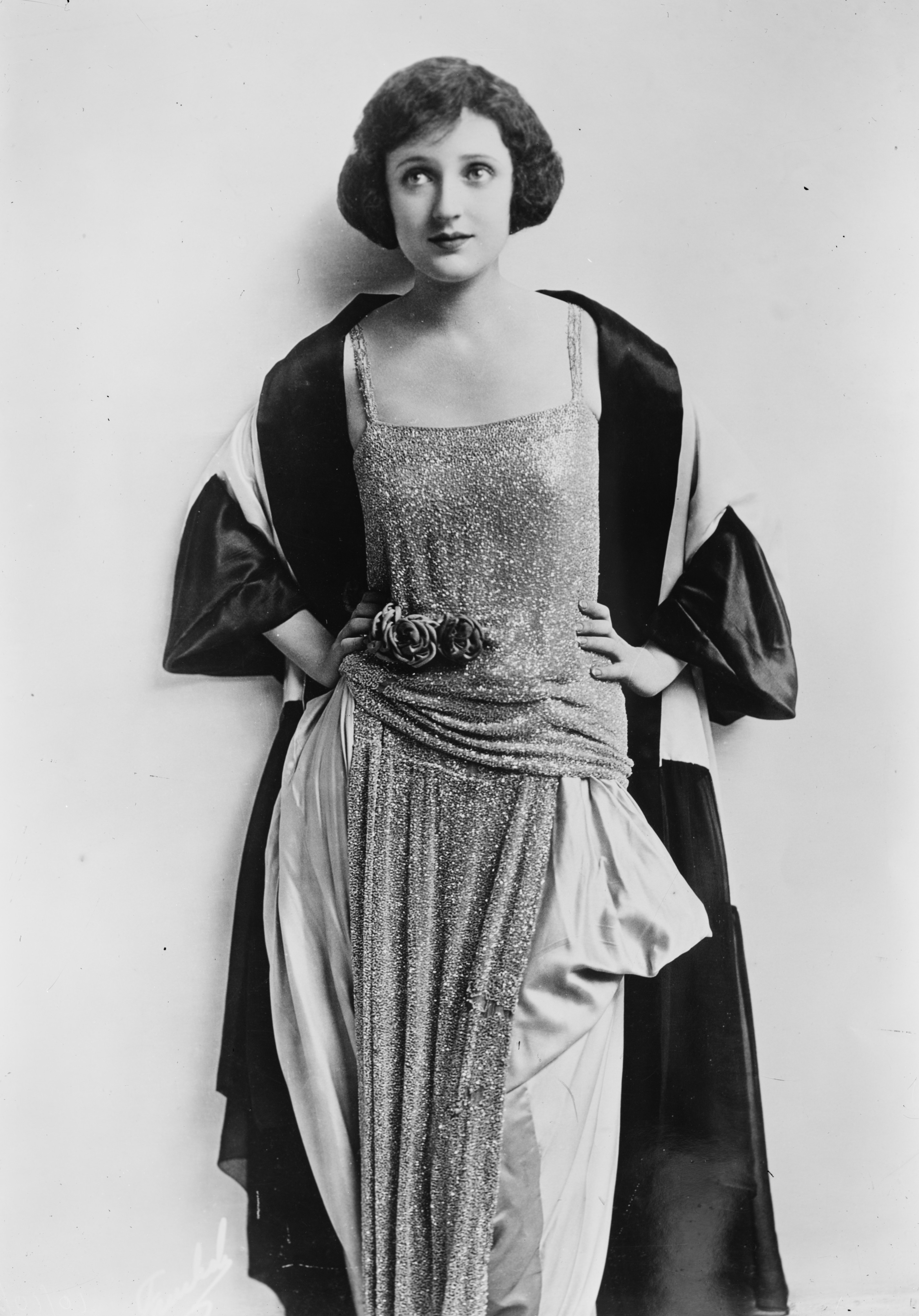
Myers, c. 1922

In 1925, she appeared in arguably her most famous role, that of the Egyptian vamp Iras in Ben-Hur, who tries to seduce both Messala (Francis X. Bushman) and Ben-Hur himself (Ramón Novarro). This film was a boost to her career, and she appeared in major roles throughout the 1920s, including Tell It to the Marines in 1926 with Lon Chaney, Sr., William Haines, and Eleanor Boardman. Myers appeared in Four Walls and Dream of Love, both with Joan Crawford in 1928; and in The Show of Shows (1929), a showcase of popular contemporary film actors.

=== Sound films, radio, and television ===
Myers had a fairly successful sound career, mostly in supporting roles, perhaps due to her image as a vamp rather than as a sympathetic heroine. Subsequently, she began giving more attention to her private life following the birth of her son in May 1932. Amongst her popular sound films are Svengali (1931) and The Mad Genius (1931), both with John Barrymore and Marian Marsh, and a small role in 1944's The Conspirators, which featured Paul Henreid, Peter Lorre, and Sydney Greenstreet.

In 1939, Myers performed for 13 weeks on the Resinol radio program that was broadcast twice weekly from station KHJ and carried on the Don Lee Network.

In 1951, Myers had a celebrity interview TV program, The Carmel Myers Show, on ABC. In 1952, she formed Carmel Myers Productions, a firm for producing radio and TV programs. The company's productions included Mark Hellinger Tales, a transcribed series of 30-minute radio dramas with Edward Arnold as narrator and Cradle of Stars, a 30-minute filmed TV series with Gregory Ratoff as director and star.

Later, she focused on a career in real estate and her perfume distribution company. In 1976, Myers was one of the very few silent stars who were cast in Won Ton Ton, the Dog Who Saved Hollywood, a comedy featuring cameos by dozens of Hollywood stars of the past.

=== Book ===
In 1952, Doubleday & Company published Don't Think About It, a 64-page book by Myers. Based on her experiences following the death of her husband, the book related her philosophy for emotional survival after a person has a tragedy in his or her life.

== Personal life ==
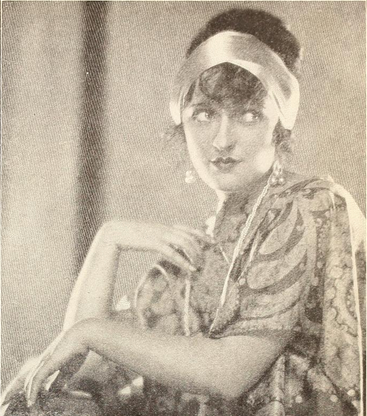
Myers c.1923

Myers was married on July 16, 1919 to attorney and songwriter Isadore B. Kornblum; they divorced in 1923.

Myers and attorney Ralph H. Blum married on June 9, 1929, and had three children: author Ralph H. Blum (born 1932), known for his works on divination through Norse runes, and two adopted daughters, actress and radio personality Susan Adams Kennedy (born 1940) and television producer Mary Cossette (born 1941). Grandson literary agent/manager John Ufland (born 1962)Myers and Blum purchased Gloria Swanson's Sunset Boulevard home.

On October 30, 1951, Myers married Paramount Pictures executive Alfred W. Schwalberg in Brooklyn. They were married until his death in 1974.

== Death ==
Myers died of a heart attack on November 9, 1980, in Los Angeles Medical Center at the age of 81. She was buried near her parents at Home of Peace Cemetery in East Los Angeles. Her epitaph reads "L'Chaim", which is Hebrew for "to life".

== Filmography ==
=== Film roles ===
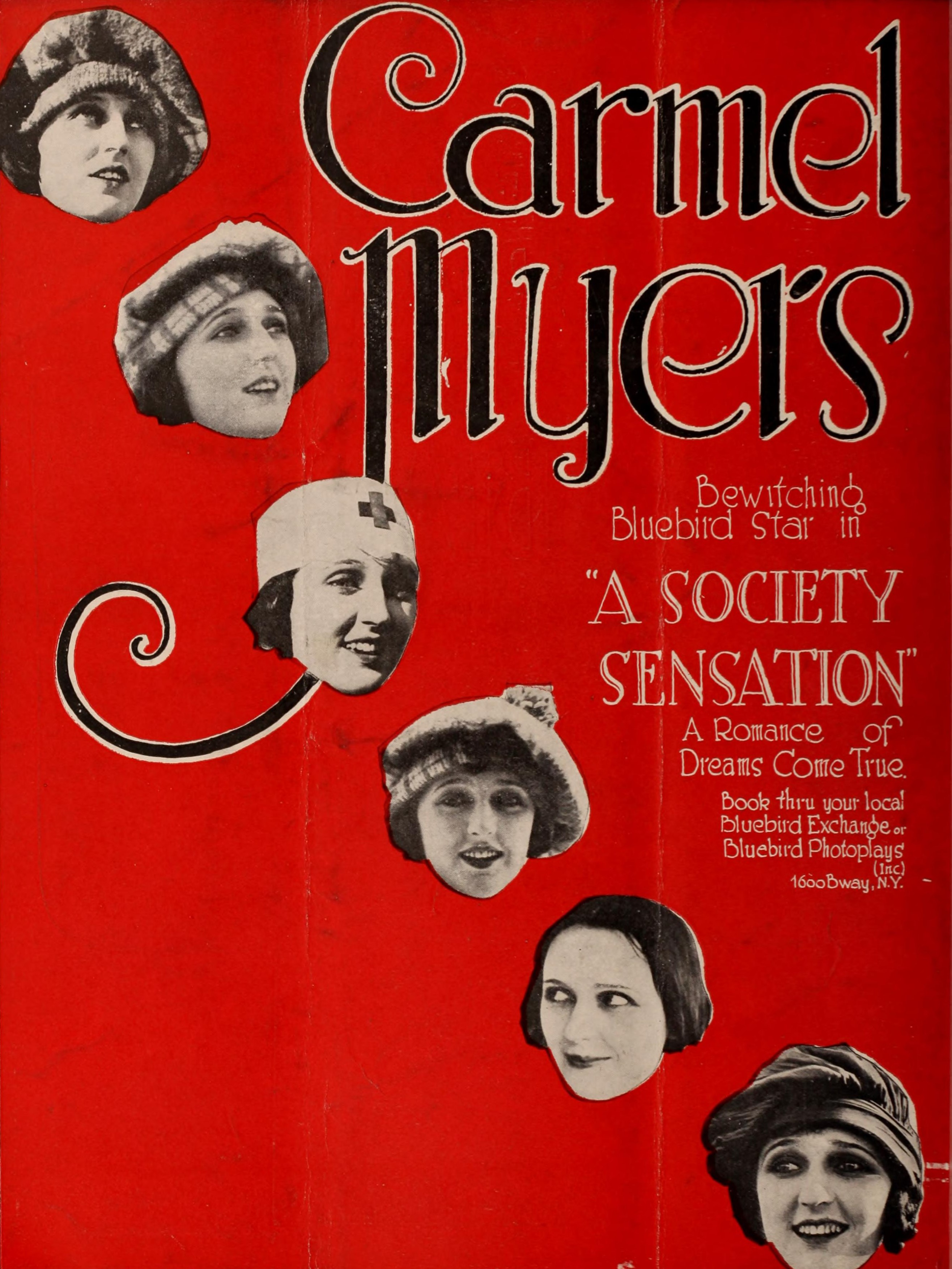
Advertisement for A Society Sensation (1918)

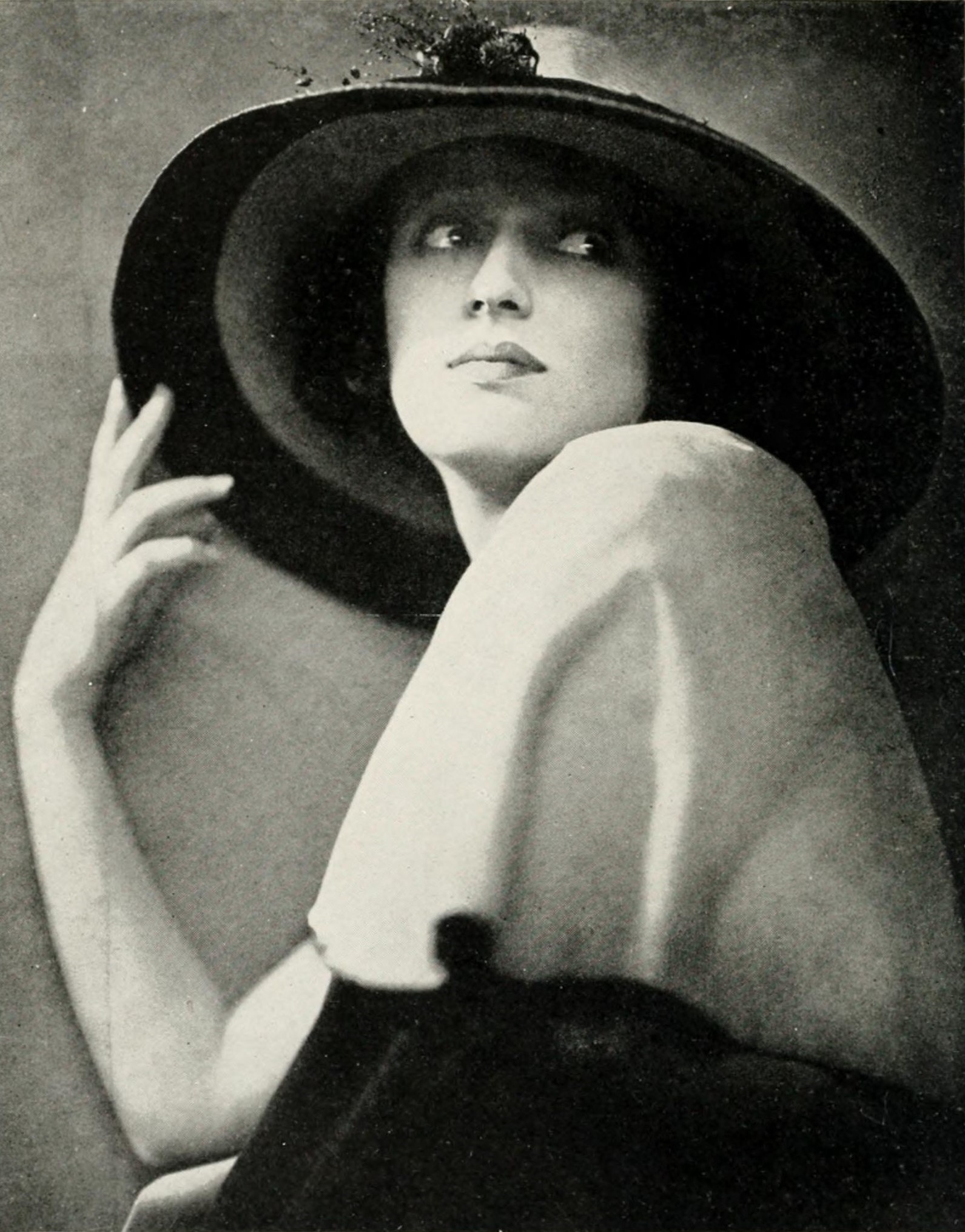
c. 1920

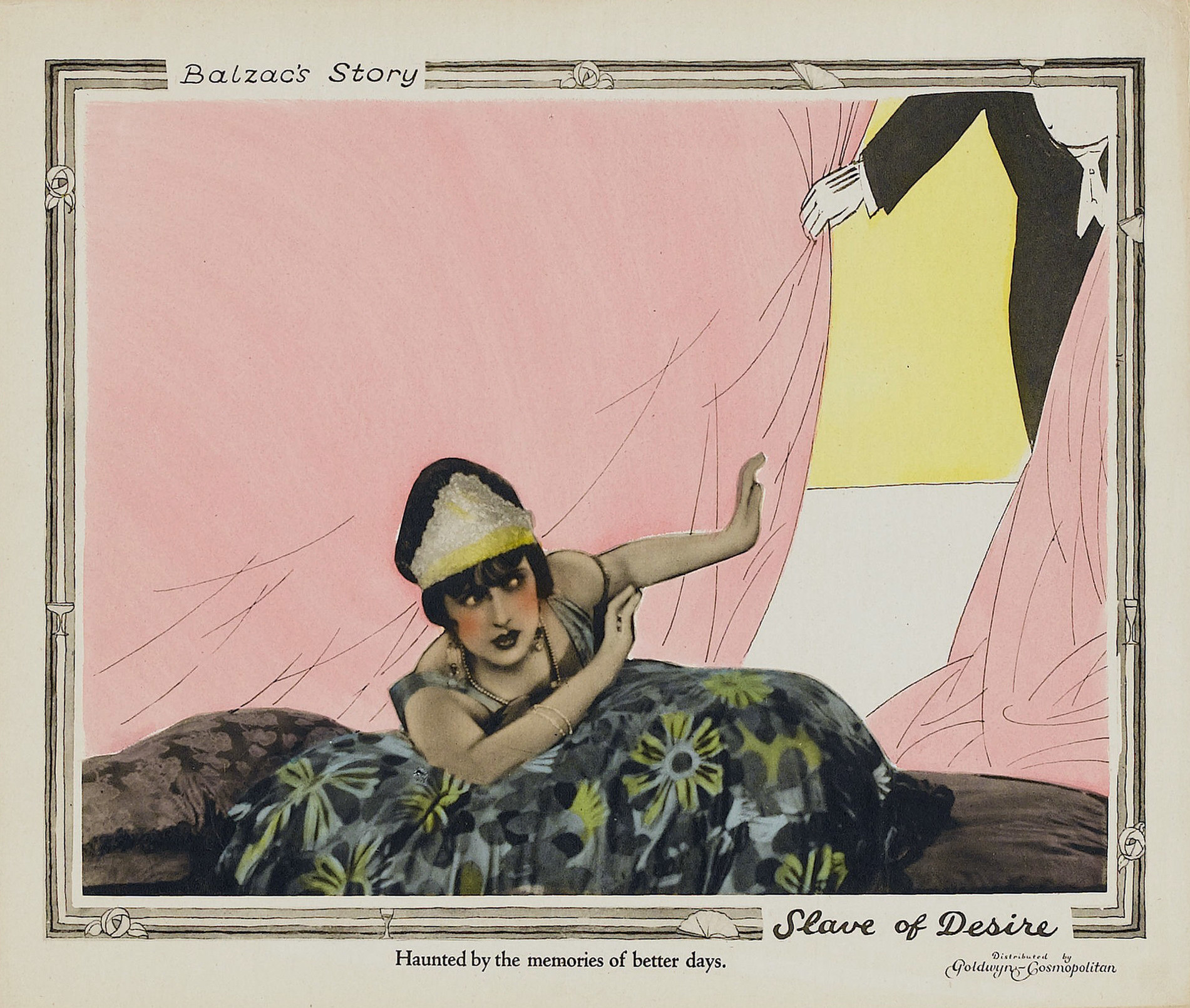
Lobby card for Slave of Desire (1923)

Year	Title	Role	Notes
1915	Georgia Pearce		
1916	Intolerance	Favorite of the Harem	Uncredited
1916	The Heiress at Coffee Dan's	Waitress	Uncredited
1917	The Bad Boy	Bit Role	Uncredited
1917	Stage Struck	Bit Role	Uncredited
1917	A Love Sublime	Toinette	
1917	A Daughter of the Poor	Hazel Fleming	
1917	Might and the Man	Winifred	
1917	The Haunted Pajamas	Frances Kirkland	
1917	Sirens of the Sea	Julie	
1917	The Lash of Power	Marion Sherwood	
1918	My Unmarried Wife	Mary Cunningham	
1918	The Wife He Bought	Janice Brieson	
1918	The Girl in the Dark	Lois Fox	
1918	The Wine Girl	Bona	
1918	The Marriage Lie	Eileen Orton	
1918	A Broadway Scandal	Nenette Bisson	
1918	The City of Tears	Rosa Carillo	
1918	The Dream Lady	Rosamond Gilbert	
1918	All Night	Elizabeth Lane	
1919	Who Will Marry Me?	Rosie Sanguinetti	
1919	The Little White Savage	Minnie Lee	
1920	In Folly's Trail	Lita O'Farrell	
1920	The Gilded Dream	Leona	
1920	Beautifully Trimmed	Norine Lawton	
1921	The Mad Marriage	Jane Judd	
1921	The Dangerous Moment	Sylvia Palprini	
1921	Cheated Love	Sonya Schonema	
1921	The Kiss	Erolinda Vargas	
1921	Breaking Through	Bettina Lowden	
1921	A Daughter of the Law	Nora Hayes	
1922	The Love Gambler	Jean McClelland	
1922	The Danger Point	Alice Torrance	Lost film
1923	The Last Hour	Saidee McCall	
1923	The Famous Mrs. Fair	Angy Brice	
1923	Good-By Girls!	Florence Brown	
1923	The Little Girl Next Door	Milly Amory	
1923	Mary of the Movies	Herself	Uncredited
1923	Slave of Desire	Countess Fedora	
1923	The Dancer of the Nile	Arvia	Lost film
1923	The Love Pirate	Ruby Le Maar	Lost film
1923	Reno	Mrs. Dora Carson Tappan	
1924	Poisoned Paradise: The Forbidden Story of Monte Carlo	Mrs. Belmire	
1924	Beau Brummel	Lady Hester Stanhope	
1924	Broadway After Dark	Lenore Vance	
1924	Babbitt	Tanis Judique	
1924	Garragan		
1925	Ben-Hur: A Tale of the Christ	Iras	
1926	The Devil's Circus	Yonna	
1926	The Gay Deceiver	Countess de Sano	
1926	Tell It to the Marines	Zaya	
1927	The Demi-Bride	Madame Girard	
1927	The Understanding Heart	Kelcey Dale	
1927	The Girl from Rio	Lola	
1927	Sorrell and Son	Flo Palfrey	
1928	A Certain Young Man	Mrs. Crutchley	
1928	Prowlers of the Sea	Mercedes	
1928	Four Walls	Bertha	
1928	Dream of Love	The Countess	
1929	The Ghost Talks	Marie Haley	
1929	Careers	The Woman	
1929	The Careless Age	Rayetta	
1929	Broadway Scandals	Valeska	
1929	The Red Sword	Katherine	
1929	The Show of Shows	Performer in 'Ladies of the Ensemble' Number	
1930	The Ship from Shanghai	Viola Thorpe	
1930	A Lady Surrenders	Sonia	
1931	The Lion and the Lamb	Inez	
1931	Svengali	Madame Honori	
1931	Pleasure	Mrs. Dorothy Whitley	
1931	Chinatown After Dark	Madame Ying Su	
1931	The Mad Genius	Sonya Preskoya	
1931	Nice Women	Dorothy Drew	
1932	No Living Witness	Emillia	
1934	The Countess of Monte Cristo	Flower Girl	
1942	Lady for a Night	Mrs. Dickson	
1944	The Conspirators	Baroness von Kluge	Uncredited
1945	George White's Scandals	Leslie	Uncredited
1946	Whistle Stop	Estelle	
1976	Won Ton Ton, the Dog Who Saved Hollywood	Woman Journalist	Final film role

=== Short subjects ===
Year	Title	Role	Notes
1916	Tough Luck on a Rough Sea	The Son's Fiancée	
1916	The Jailbird's Last Flight	The Girl	
1916	Ignatz's Icy Injury	Miss Rustlebucks	
1918	A Society Sensation	Sydney Parmelee	
1926	Camille	Agatha	
1928	The Bath Between	The Wife	
1929	He Did His Best		
1930	The Stronger Sex		
1942	Pretty Dolly	Mrs Errol	

=== Television Credits ===
Year	Title	Role	Notes
1950	Danger		Episode: "The Green and Gold String"
1951-1952	The Carmel Myers Show	Host	
1953	Studio One		Episode: "The Magic Lantern"
1975	The Wide World of Mystery		Episode: "Nick and Nora"
1975	Chico and the Man	Violette Baines	Episode: "Bird in a Gilded Cage"
