= Slave of Desire =

1923 film by George D. Baker

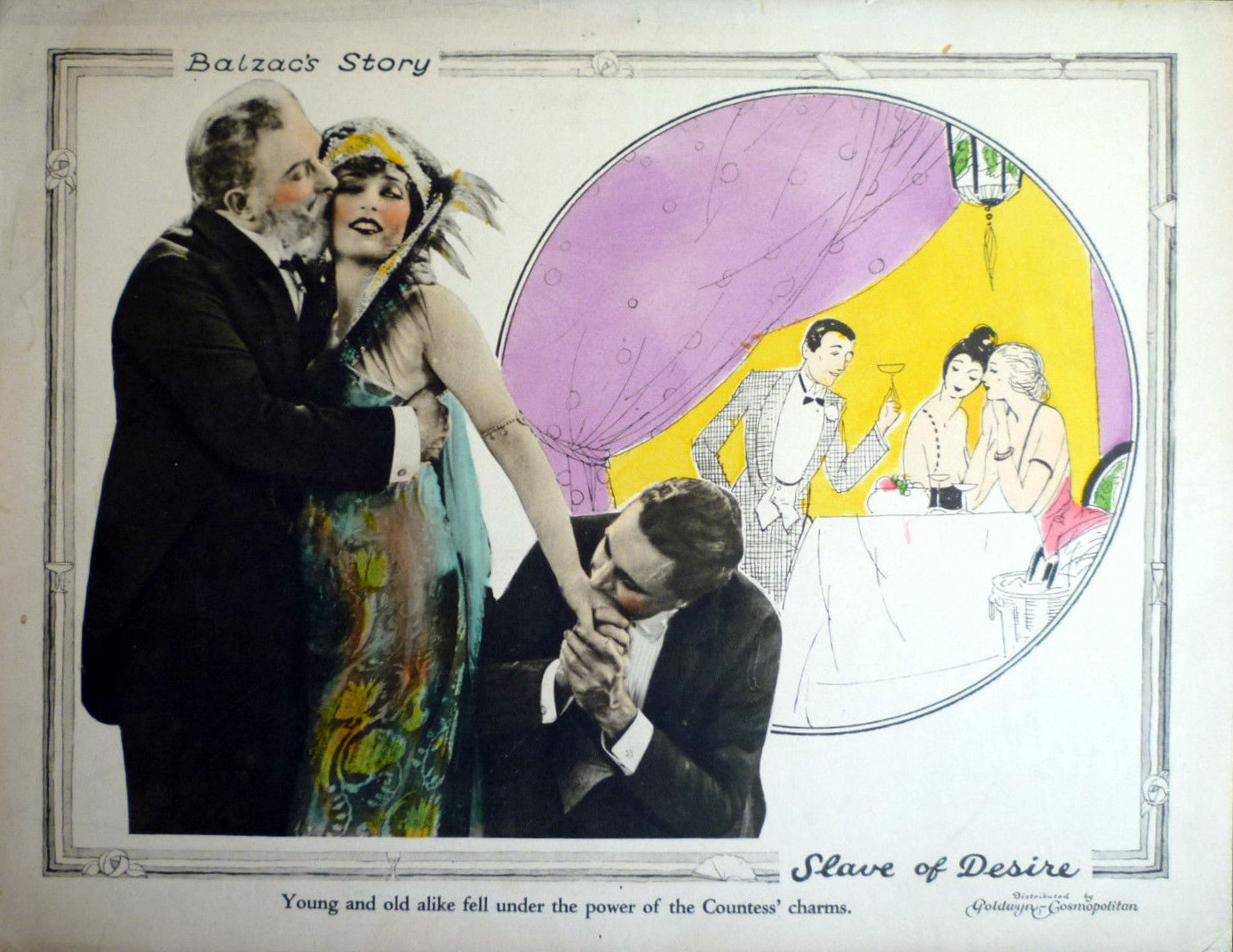
- Lobby card
- Directed by: George D. Baker
- Written by: Alice D. G. Miller (adaptation); Charles W. Whittaker (scenario)
- Based on: La Peau de chagrin by Honoré de Balzac
- Produced by: Samuel Goldwyn; Gilbert E. Gable
- Starring: George Walsh; Bessie Love; Carmel Myers
- Cinematography: John W. Boyle
- Production company: Goldwyn Pictures
- Distributed by: Goldwyn Pictures
- Release date: October 14, 1923 (U.S.)
- Running time: 7 reels; 6,673 feet
- Country: United States
- Language: Silent (English intertitles)

Slave of Desire (originally titled The Magic Skin) is a 1923 American silent drama film directed by George D. Baker, produced and distributed by Goldwyn Pictures. It was based on the novel La Peau de chagrin (Note: The French title La Peau de Chagrin translates to The Skin of Sorrow, but the novel was retitled The Magic Skin for the English language editions.) by Honoré de Balzac, first published in 1831. The Balzac novel had previously been filmed in 1909 as The Wild Ass's Skin, which was more faithful to the original novel.

The picture stars George Walsh, Bessie Love, and Carmel Myers. A print of the film is preserved in the collection of Cinémathèque Française.

== Plot ==
In Paris, when failed poet Raphael, Marquis de Valentin meets the glamorous Countess Fedora, who promotes Raphael as a poet. He falls in love with her, but she rejects him.

When he is about to commit suicide by jumping into the Seine, Raphael enters an antique shop where he gets a magic piece of leather that can grant wishes. As it grants wishes, the leather becomes smaller. Raphael selfishly uses the wishes for himself, but uses the final wish benevolently, which enables him to be reunited with his true love, Pauline. Countess Fedora is buried under an avalanche.

== Cast ==
- George Walsh as Raphael, Marquis de Valentin
- Bessie Love as Pauline Gaudin
- Carmel Myers as Countess Fedora
- Wally Van as Restignac
- Edward Connelly as the antiquarian
- Eulalie Jensen as Mrs. Gaudin
- Herbert Prior as Mr. Gaudin
- William Orlamond as Champrose
- Nick De Ruiz as Tallifer
- William von Hardenburg as the general
- Harmon MacGregor as Emilie
- George Periolat as the duke
- Harry Lorraine as Finot
- Calvert Carter as the major domo

== Production ==
Slave of Desire was partially shot on location in Chatsworth, Los Angeles.

== Reception ==
The film received mixed reviews, with many reviewers noting the fanciful plot and subject matter as a hindrance to the film's success.

Carmel Myers's performance was especially highly praised, as were the visuals, especially Myers's wardrobe.
