= All Night (film) =

1918 film

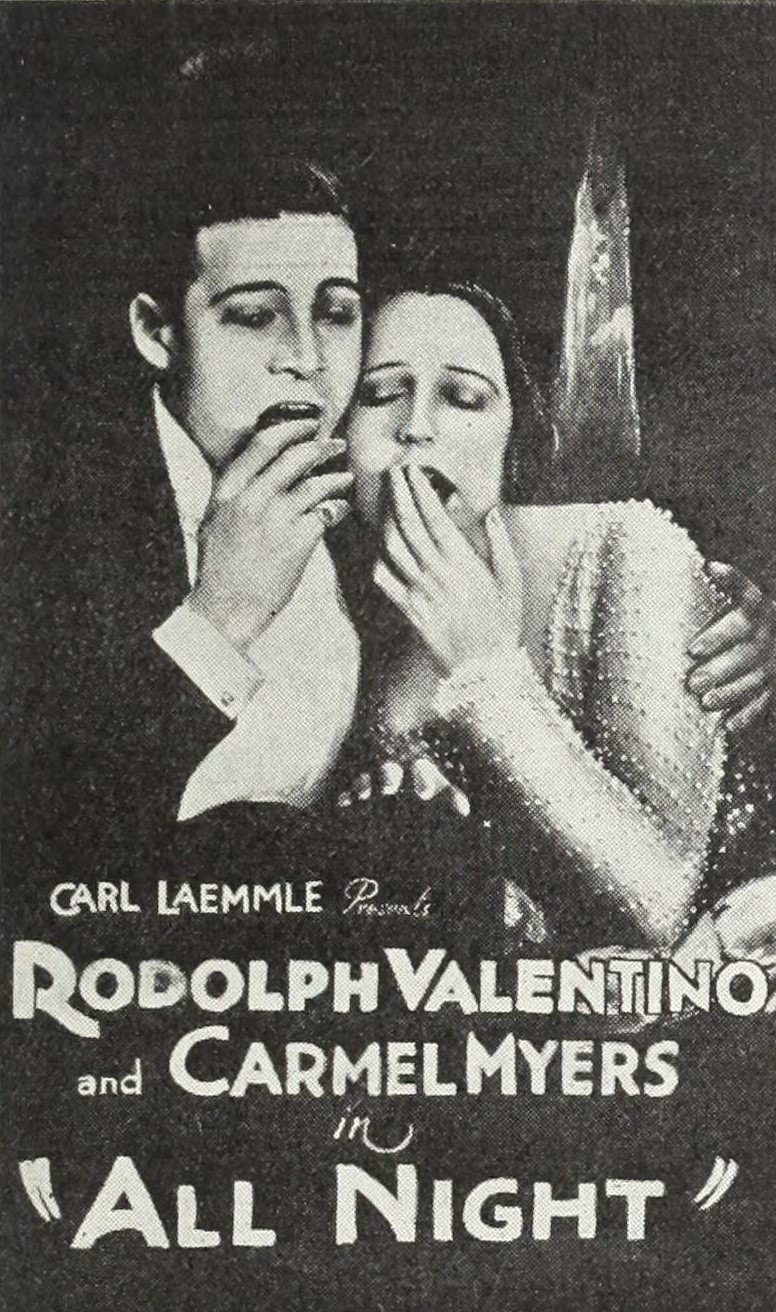
- Poster for the 1922 re-release
- Directed by: Paul Powell
- Written by: Fred Myton (scenario)
- Story by: Edgar Franklin
- Starring: Carmel Myers; Rudolpho di Valentina; Charles Dorian; Mary Warren; William Dyer
- Production company: Bluebird Photoplays
- Distributed by: Bluebird Photoplays
- Release date: November 30, 1918
- Running time: 57 minutes
- Country: United States
- Language: Silent (English intertitles)

All Night is a 1918 American silent comedy-drama film directed by Paul Powell and starring Carmel Myers and Rudolph Valentino (credited as Rudolpho di Valentina). It was released by Universal Pictures under the name Bluebird Photoplays.

A print of the film still survives and was released to DVD by Grapevine Video in 2005.

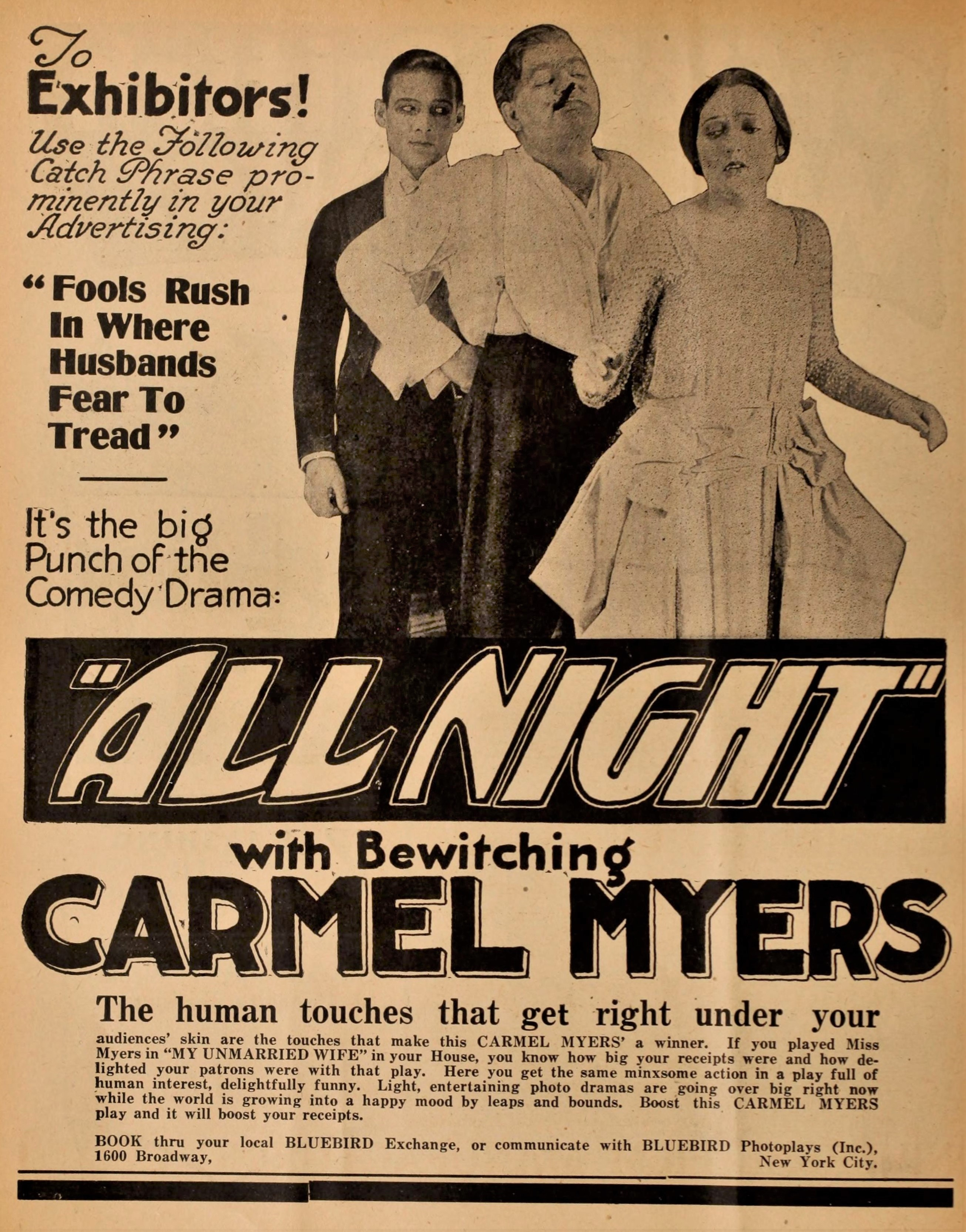
1918 advertisement for the original release with the tagline "Fools Rush In Where Husbands Fear To Tread." Note that Carmel Myers is given top billing and that Valentino is not even mentioned; four years later, Valentino was one of the biggest stars of the screen and as such was heavily promoted for the re-release.

== Plot ==
Richard Thayer, a shy, unassuming man, is in love with a sheltered young woman, Elizabeth ("Beth") Lane. While the feelings are mutual and Richard wishes to propose, he can never find a moment to speak to Beth alone—she is constantly surrounded by admirers and her overprotective father.

Richard explains his predicament to his friends, young married couple William and Maude Harcourt. They agree to help by hosting Richard and Beth at a private dinner at their home. Beth's father agrees to let her dine with the Harcourts, but insists that she keep to an 11:00 curfew.

The evening of the dinner William Harcourt receives a telegram from a prospective business associate, Bradford, informing him that he is arriving that night for a surprise visit. The announcement throws the Harcourts into a panic. William has recently mortgaged his home and life savings to buy a copper mine; he is counting on a $1-million investment from Bradford to save his business and house. He does not have any servants to welcome the millionaire, having fired them earlier in the day in a fit of rage.

Working together, the four friends devise a plan: Richard and Beth will pose as the Harcourts; the real Harcourts will play the servants because they are familiar with the layout of their house. The scheme initially works, but things quickly deteriorate when Bradford, an eccentric, overbearing man, starts flirting with Maude Harcourt and insisting that Richard and Beth turn in for the night. The situation worsens when Beth misses her curfew and her father shows up at the Harcourt home to look for her. Eventually, everything is solved, but not before Col. Lane is locked in the pantry, Richard falls out a window and William is tossed out of his own house.

== Cast ==
- Carmel Myers as Elizabeth Lane
- Rudolpho di Valentina as Richard Thayer
- Charles Dorian as William Harcourt
- Mary Warren as Maude Harcourt
- William Dyer as Bradford
- Wadsworth Harris as Col. Lane
- Jack Hull as the butler

== Reception ==
All Night was reviewed by Motion Picture News on October 28, 1918, while it was under its working title, One Bright Idea. The reviewer, P. S. Harrison, was beaming: "This is about the craziest thing I have ever seen. It is so funny you will die laughing when you see it. It seems strange producers don't make more pictures along these lines." He went on to summarize its plot and concluded with, "The picture contains no offensive scenes. It is a wholesome comedy all the way through and fit to show any audience."

By contrast, the reviewer Robert C. McElravy wrote in the December 7, 1918 edition of The Moving Picture World that, "The production as a whole fails to live up to its possibilities for some reason that is difficult to understand. It contains good material for a breezy farce, but there is a certain vagueness in the opening reels and a lack of reality that is never quite overcome as the piece develops." Speaking specifically on the efforts of William Dyer in the role of Bradford, it was thought that he "struggles hard to put the character over, but it never quite reaches the point of conviction."

== Production ==
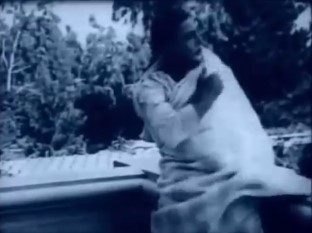
Richard Thayer (Rudolph Valentino)

All Night is one of Valentino's earliest films, and one of the few in which he plays a comedic role. In contrast to the screen persona of "The Great Lover", his character of Richard Thayer is shy and insecure. For this film, Valentino performed several scenes of physical comedy and pratfalls, including falling from a window into a barrel of water. Valentino and Myers starred together previously in A Society Sensation, also directed by Paul Powell. Powell praised Valentino's work. Valentino recalled to Photoplay, "He was the first to say, 'Stick to it and you'll make a name for yourself.'"

== Re-release ==
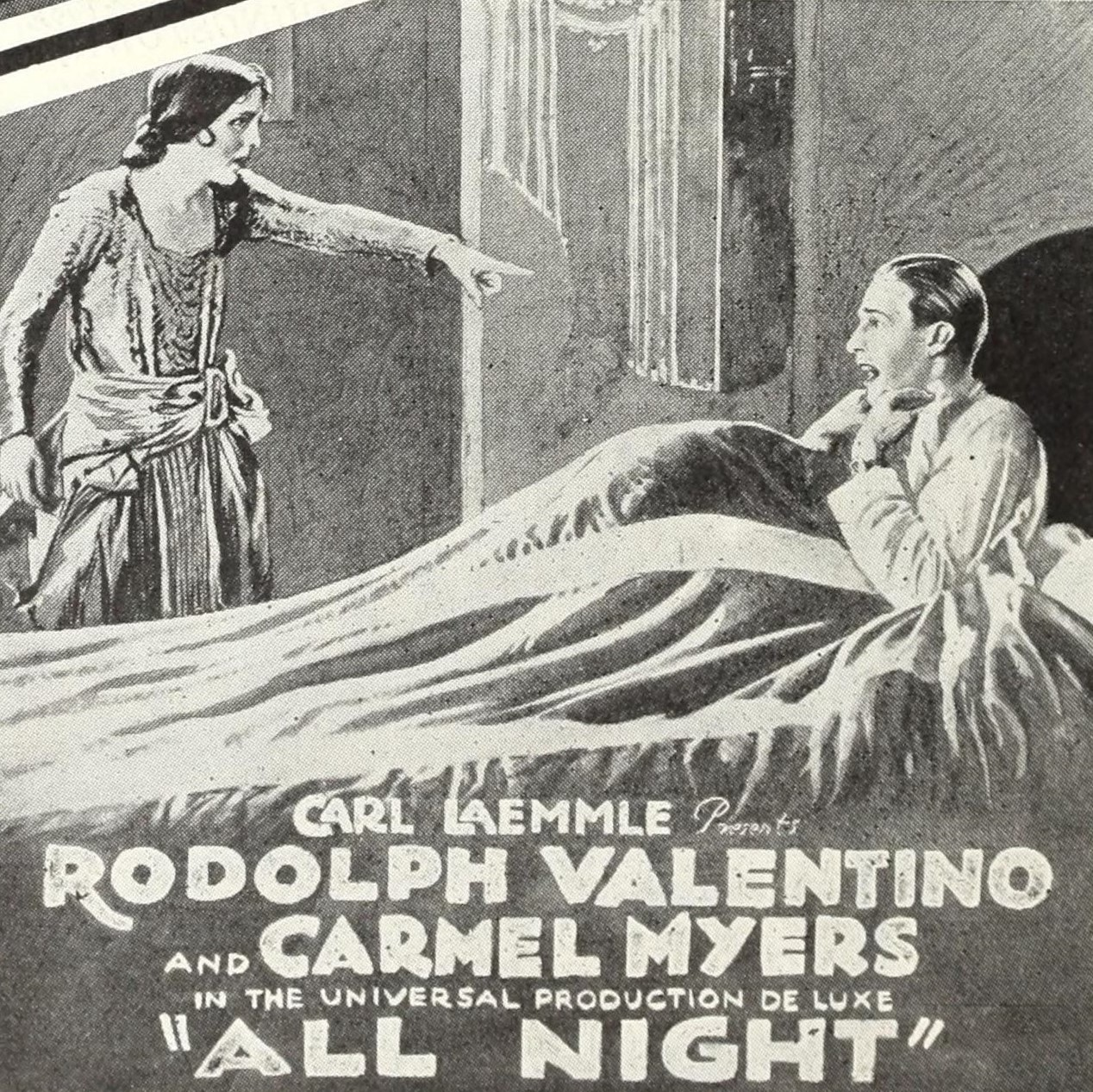
Poster for the 1922 re-release

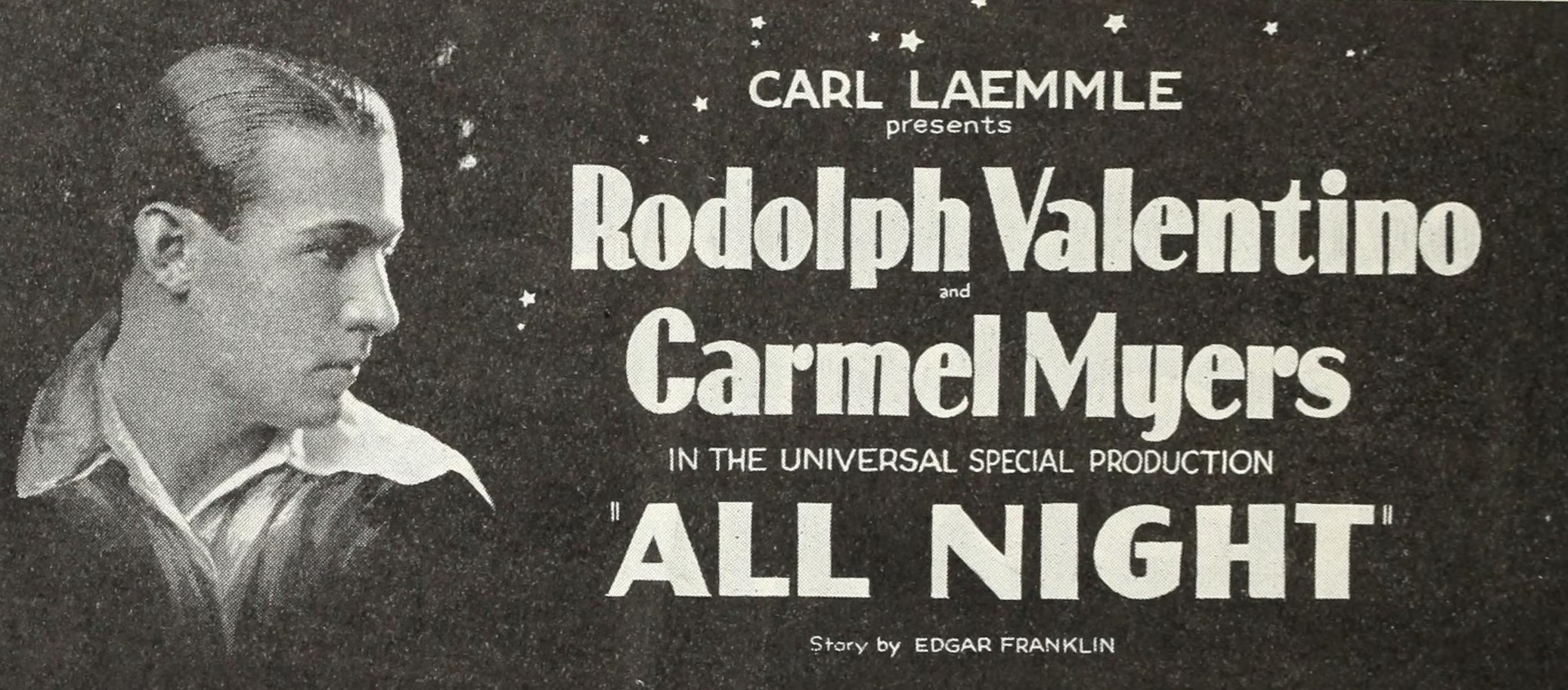
Poster for the 1922 re-release

Unlike the re-releases of early Valentino films A Society Sensation and Stolen Moments, the original length of All Night was kept intact. Re-release advertisements described Valentino's role as that of an "ideal lover" and the story as "a throbbing romance of love, beauty, and daring". These descriptions can't be farther from the truth and were only meant to capitalize on Valentino's new image as the "Great Lover".
