= Altars of Desire =

1927 film

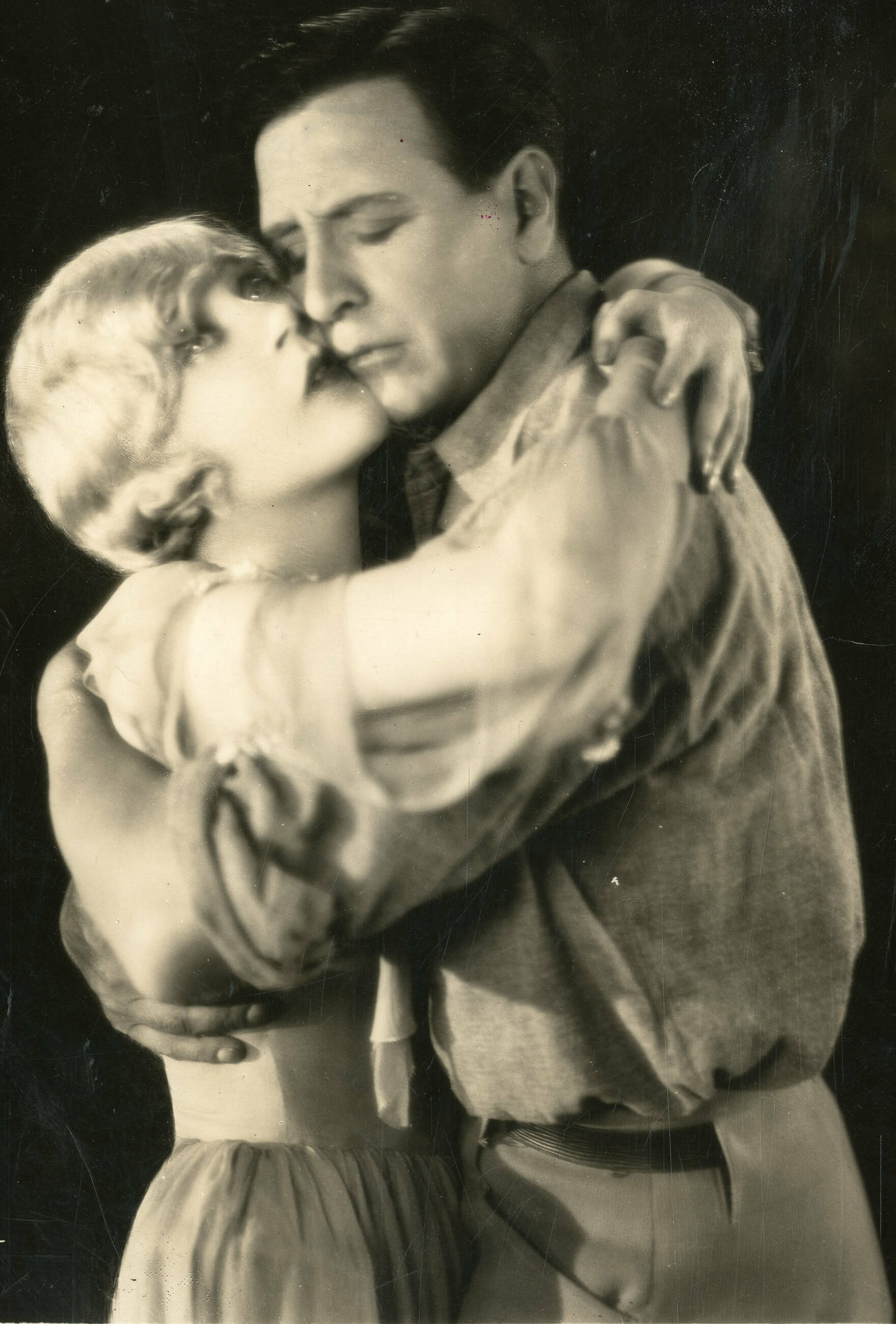
- 1926 publicity still of Conway Tearle and Mae Murray in Altars of Desire
- Directed by: Christy Cabanne
- Written by: Agnes Christine Johnston; Albert E. Lewin; Alice D. G. Miller
- Story by: Maria Thompson Daviess
- Starring: Mae Murray; Conway Tearle
- Cinematography: William H. Daniels
- Distributed by: Metro-Goldwyn-Mayer
- Release date: February 5, 1927
- Running time: 70 minutes
- Country: United States
- Language: Silent (English intertitles)

Altars of Desire is a 1927 American silent drama film directed by Christy Cabanne and starring silent movie star Mae Murray. It was produced and released by MGM.

A print of Altars of Desire survives and is preserved by MGM.

== Synopsis ==
Claire is sent to Paris by her father to acquire some refinement. A treasure-hunter stalks her, but so does good guy David Elrod, who rescues her.

== Cast ==
- Mae Murray as Claire Sutherland
- Conway Tearle as David Elrod
- Robert Edeson as John Sutherland
- Maude George as Kitty Pryor
- George Beranger as Count André D'Orville
