= A Society Sensation =

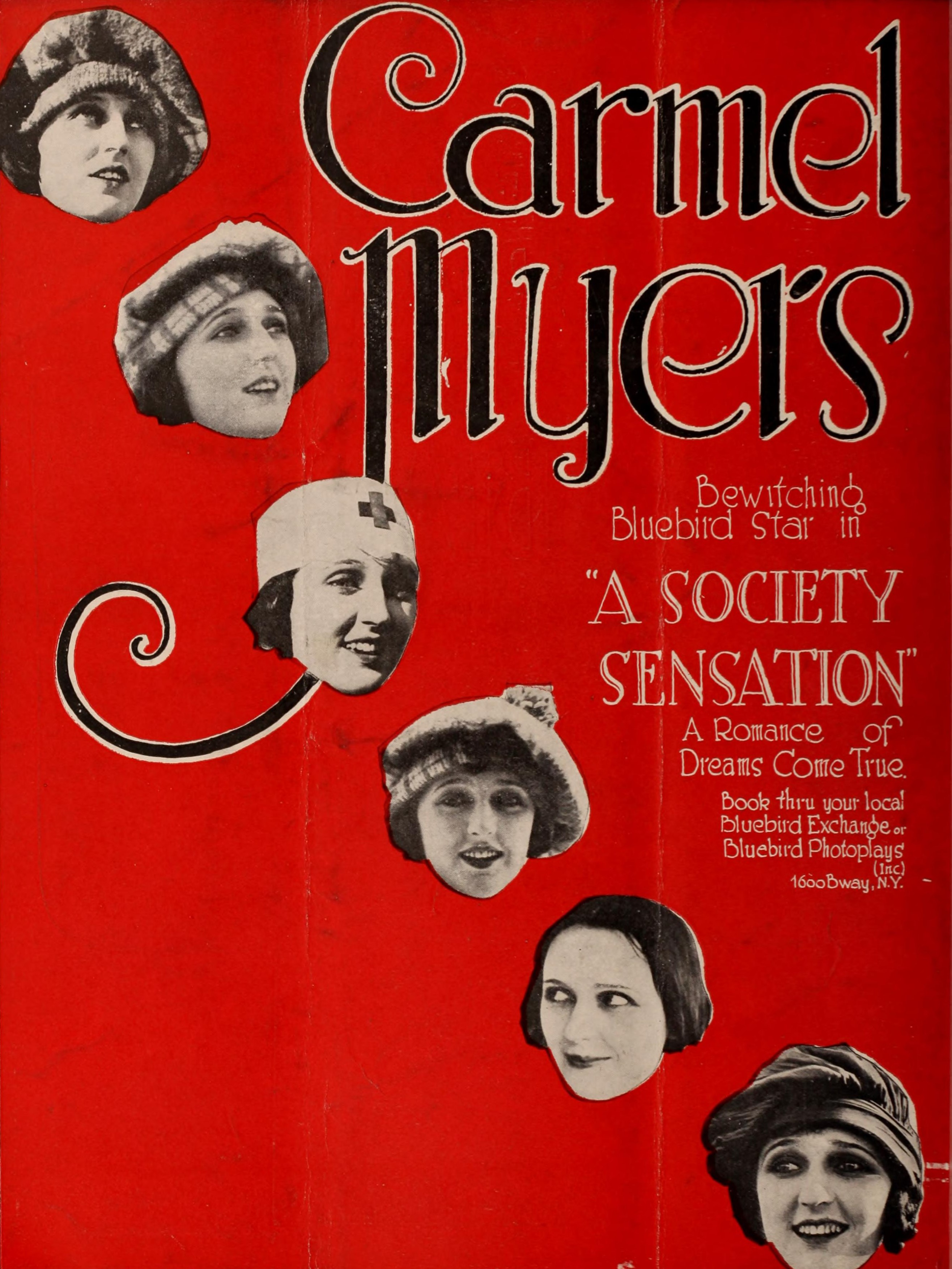
- Advertisement for the film
- Directed by: Paul Powell
- Written by: Hope Loring; Paul Powell
- Story by: the short story "The Borrowed Duchess" by Perley Poore Sheehan or Hapsburg Liebe
- Starring: Carmel Myers; Rudolpho De Valentina
- Production company: Bluebird Photoplays
- Distributed by: Bluebird Photoplays
- Release date: September 23, 1918
- Running time: 50 min. (original; now lost); 24 min. (re-release)
- Country: United States
- Language: Silent (English intertitles)

The re-release version

A Society Sensation is a 1918 American silent comedy-drama film directed by Paul Powell and starring Carmel Myers and Rudolph Valentino (credited as Rudolpho De Valentina). It was released by Universal Pictures under their imprint Bluebird Photoplays. When it was re-released in 1924, it was cut down to 24 minutes to include mostly scenes that feature Valentino, although it was Carmel Myers who originally starred in the film.

== Plot (24-minute version) ==
In the spring of 1917 in the fishing village of St. Margaret's, Jim Cox loves Captain Harry Hannibal Fairfax's daughter Margaret, but the captain, who claims to be the rightful British Marquis of Deerford, refuses to let a "common fisherman" marry her. Instead, he has arranged an extended stay for her with the nouveau riche Mrs. Jones to be made into a "society lady".

Margaret has her debut (after much coaching) at the Golden Gate Country Club in San Francisco. Nearby, Richard Bradley races another man in the ocean, but gets cramps while swimming. Nobody notices except Margaret, who runs down to the beach and into the water, rescuing him from drowning. Mrs. Jones informs her that Richard is the son of Mrs. Bradley, the leader of high society. Mrs. Jones introduces Margaret as the Duchess of Deerford. A romance develops. Richard starts to ask Margaret something, but loses his nerve because she is a duchess.

However, Captain Fairfax receives a letter from his lawyer informing him that he is not a marquis. His wife goes to bring Margaret home, but Richard mistakes her for a beggar and gives her some money, much to Margaret's horror. She goes home and resumes working.

Richard arrives at St. Margaret's aboard his yacht and asks Margaret to marry him. She turns him down due to the great social gulf between them, but he persuades her to meet him on the beach after dinner. A jealous Jim kidnaps her as she is waiting and takes her aboard his boat, but is seen by Mary, a girl who is sweet on Jim. Mary raises the alarm, but Captain Fairfax misunderstands and assumes Richard is the kidnapper. Mary informs Richard, who boards Jim's boat and fights the kidnapper (with some help from Margaret). He manages to fling Jim overboard, then takes Margaret to his yacht. Margaret's friends come to "rescue" her, but after some brawling, Margaret clears things up. Then Captain Fairfax and Mrs. Jones bring some surprising news: Mrs. Bradley's lawyer has found proof that Margaret is a duchess after all.

== Cast ==
The first character names are for the original version, as per the American Film Institute film entry. The second character names are from the intertitles of the re-release.

- Carmel Myers as Sydney Parmelee / Margaret Fairfax
- Rudolpho De Valentina as Dick Bradley / Richard Bradley
- Lydia Yeamans Titus as Mrs. Jones / Mrs. Jones
- Alfred Allen as Captain Parmelee / Captain Harry Hannibal Fairfax
- Fred Kelsey as Jim (Jim Cox, according to Silentera.com) / Jim Cox
- ZaSu Pitts as Mary / Mary
- Harold Goodwin as Timmy (Tommy Parmalee, according to Silentera.com) / ?
