= Servitor (disambiguation) =

Servitor may be used in the following contexts:

- Servitor, an Oxford University undergraduate student who received free accommodation
- Servitor, a uniformed porter at the University of Edinburgh
- Imar the Servitor, a 1914 American silent film
- The Knights Servitors, part of an ancient order of knighthood for priests
- Veterans of the Irish Nine Years' War
