= The House of a Thousand Candles (1915 film) =

1915 film by Thomas N. Heffron

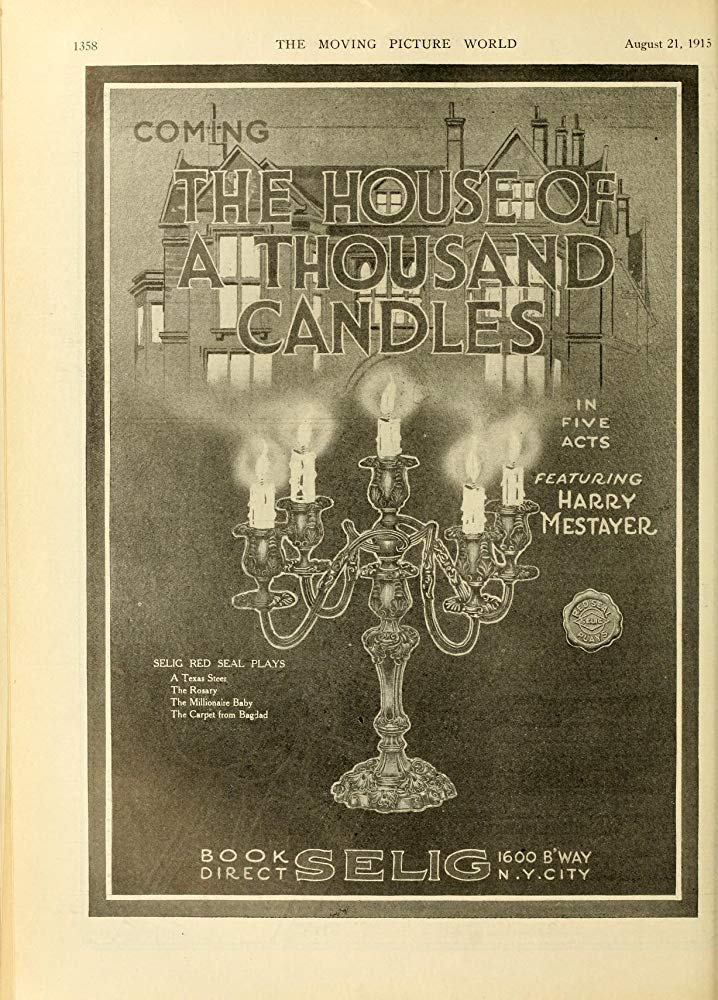
- Directed by: Thomas N. Heffron
- Written by: Meredith Nicholson (novel); Gilson Willets
- Produced by: William Nicholas Selig
- Starring: Harry Mestayer; Grace Darmond; John Charles
- Production company: Selig Polyscope Company
- Distributed by: V-L-S-E
- Release date: August 23, 1915
- Running time: 50 minutes
- Country: United States
- Languages: Silent; English intertitles

The House of a Thousand Candles is a 1915 American silent mystery film directed by Thomas N. Heffron and starring Harry Mestayer, Grace Darmond and John Charles. Based on a novel of the same name by Meredith Nicholson, it was remade twice, in 1919 as another silent film Haunting Shadows and a 1936 sound film The House of a Thousand Candles.

== Cast ==
- Harry Mestayer as Jack Glenarm
- Grace Darmond as Marian Evans
- John Charles as Arthur Pickering
- George Backus as John Marshall 'Squire' Glenarm
- Forrest Robinson as Bates
- Edgar Nelson as Larry Donovan
- Emma Glenwood as Theresa Evans
- Gladys Samms as Olivia Evans
- Mary Robson as Carmen
- Effingham Pinto as Don Jose

== Bibliography ==
- Goble, Alan. The Complete Index to Literary Sources in Film. Walter de Gruyter, 1999.
