= Rose of the Tenements =

1926 silent film directed by Phil Rosen

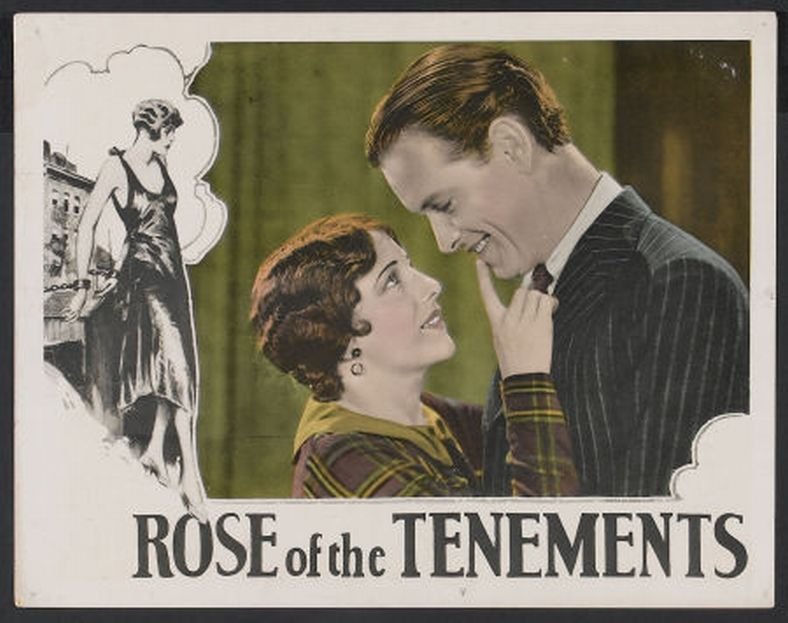
- Directed by: Phil Rosen
- Written by: J. Grubb Alexander
- Based on: The Stumbling Herd by John A. Moroso
- Produced by: Joseph P. Kennedy
- Starring: Shirley Mason; John Harron; Evelyn Selbie
- Cinematography: H. Lyman Broening
- Production company: Robertson-Cole Pictures Corporation
- Distributed by: Film Booking Offices of America
- Release date: December 5, 1926 (US)
- Running time: 7 reels
- Country: United States
- Language: Silent (English intertitles)

Rose of the Tenements is a 1926 American silent melodrama film, directed by Phil Rosen. It stars Shirley Mason, John Harron, and Evelyn Selbie, and was released on December 5, 1926, by Film Booking Offices of America.

== Plot ==
Rose Rosetti, an orphaned daughter of a New York gangster, and Danny Lewis, another orphan, were raised by Sara and Abraham Kaminsky, an elderly Jewish couple who owned an artificial-flower shop on the lower East Side. Rose works at the shop, while Danny, after defeating a bully from the ward, becomes involved with a political gang. Upon the Kaminskys' death, they reveal Rose's true parentage to her and leave the shop to Danny and Rose. Danny, rescued from the gang by Rose, becomes entangled with Willifsky, a Bolshevik agitator, and Emma Goldstein, his associate. Danny falls in love with Emma, who manipulates him for their cause. When the war with Germany breaks out, Danny refuses to enlist in the army. During an altercation where Willifsky and Emma are attacked by a crowd, Danny intervenes, assaulting a policeman to help them. With the help of Galligan, a ward leader, Danny is cleared of charges and decides to enlist in the army after preventing Emma from throwing a bomb.

== Cast list ==
- Shirley Mason as Rosie Rossetti
- John Harron as Danny Lewis
- Evelyn Selbie as Sara Kaminsky
- Sidney Franklin as Abraham Kaminsky
- James Gordon as Tim Galligan
- Frank McGlynn Jr. as Mickey Galligan
- Scott McKee as Paddy Flynn
- Jesse De Vorska as Izzie Kohn
- Mathilde Comont as Mrs. Kohn
- Valentina Zimina as Emma Goldstein

== Preservation ==
With no prints of Rose of the Tenements located in any film archives, it is a lost film.
