= Belle Bennett =

American actress (1891–1932)

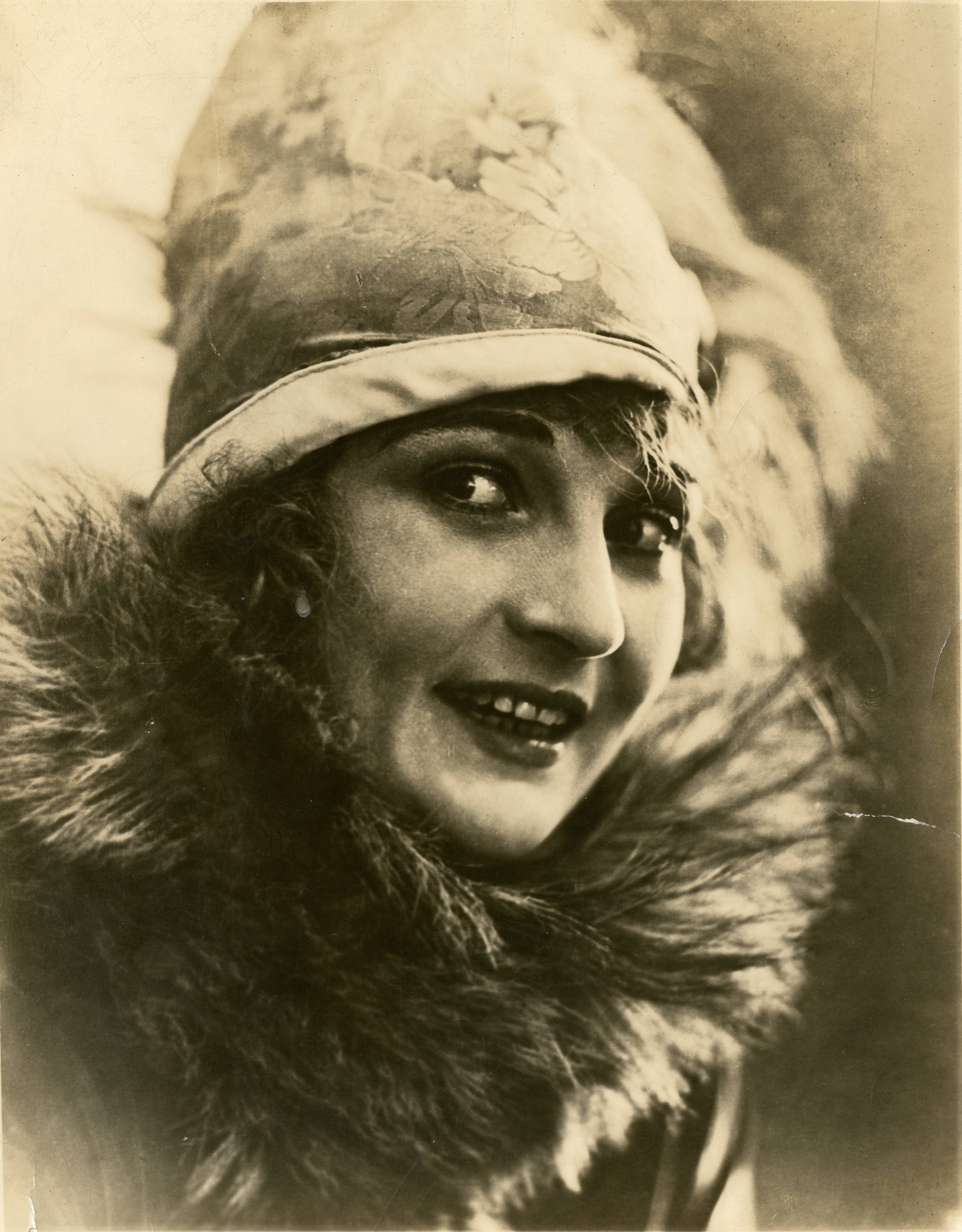
- Bennett in 1923
- Born: Ara Belle Bennett; April 22, 1891; Milaca, Minnesota, U.S.
- Died: November 4, 1932 (aged 41); Los Angeles, California, U.S.
- Resting place: Valhalla Memorial Park Cemetery
- Occupation: Actress
- Years active: 1909–1931
- Spouses: Howard Ralph Macy (m. 1908; div. 1913); Jack Oaker (divorced); Fred Windemere (m. 1924)
- Children: 3

Ara Belle Bennett (April 22, 1891 – November 4, 1932) was a stage and screen actress who started her career as a child as a circus performer. She later performed in theater and films.

== Early life and career ==
Bennett was born in Milaca, Minnesota, the daughter of Mr. and Mrs. W. B. Bennett. Her father, "Billie," managed a tent-and-wagon show that toured the Midwestern United States.

== Motion pictures ==
Bennett was working as a film actress by 1913, and she was cast in numerous one-reel shorts by small east coast film companies. She appeared in minor movies like A Ticket to Red Horse Gulch (Mutual 1914). She starred in several full-length films by the Triangle Film Corporation, including The Lonely Woman (1918). She also appeared in United States Motion Picture Corporation's film Flesh and Spirit (1922).

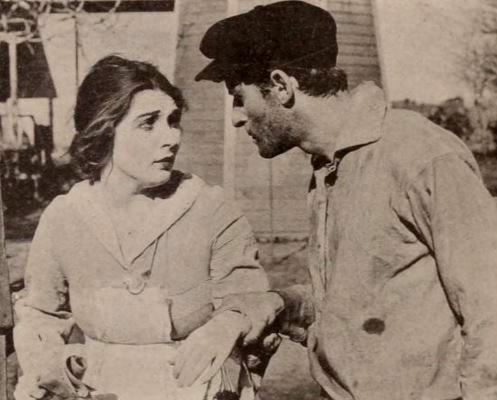
In The Lonely Woman (1918)

She made the move to Hollywood before Samuel Goldwyn selected her from 73 actresses for the leading role in Stella Dallas (1925). While she was filming the movie, her son, 16-year-old William Howard Macy, died. Macy had posed as Bennett's brother for some time, owing to her fear that her employers might find out her true age. She was actually 34 rather than 24, which she had claimed to be. Because of the loss of her son, Bennett became close to her co-stars Lois Moran and Douglas Fairbanks Jr., who were also 16 at the time.

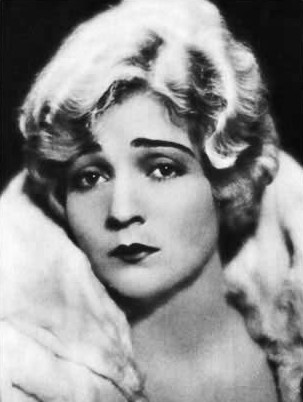
Stars of the Photoplay, 1930

After playing the mother role in Stella Dallas, Bennett was typecast for the remainder of her film career. She later appeared in Mother Machree (1928), The Battle of the Sexes (1928), The Iron Mask (1929), Courage (1930), Recaptured Love (1930) and The Big Shot (1931).

== Marriages ==
Bennett was married three times. Her first husband was Howard Ralph Macy of La Crosse, Wisconsin. They had a son together, William Howard Macy. After Billy's death, she adopted at least one other child, Theodore Macy, who was 22 when she died.

Jack Oaker, a sailor at the submarine base in San Pedro, California, was married to her when she worked with the Triangle Film Corporation in 1918.

On November 27, 1924, she married film director Fred Windemere, and she remained with him until her death.

== Death ==
Bennett died on November 4, 1932, in Hollywood, California. Her attending physician registered her cause of death as general carcinomatosis.

== Hollywood Walk of Fame ==
Bennett posthumously was inducted into the Hollywood Walk of Fame during the initial ceremonies in 1960. She received a motion pictures star, located at 1511 Vine Street.

== Partial filmography ==
- Who Is the Savage? (1913)
- Through the Sluice Gates (1913)
- A Ticket to Red Horse Gulch (1914)
- Mrs. Wiggs of the Cabbage Patch (1914)
- Mignon (1915)
- Fires of Rebellion (1917)
- The Devil Dodger (1917)
- The Fuel of Life (1917)
- The Charmer (1917)
- Bond of Fear (1917)
- Ashes of Hope (1917)
- Because of a Woman (1917)
- The Last Rebel (1918)
- The Lonely Woman (1918)
- The Atom (1918)
- The Reckoning Day (1918)
- The Mayor of Filbert (1919)
- Your Best Friend (1922)
- Flesh and Spirit (1922)
- Hello, 'Frisco (1924)
- His Supreme Moment (1925)
- Playing with Souls (1925)
- If Marriage Fails (1925)
- Stella Dallas (1925)
- East Lynne (1925)
- The Lily (1926)
- Fourth Commandment (1926)
- The Way of All Flesh (1927)
- Wild Geese (1927)
- The Devil's Skipper (1928)
- The Power of Silence (1928)
- Mother Machree (1928)
- The Sporting Age (1928)
- The Battle of the Sexes (1928)
- The Iron Mask (1929)
- Their Own Desire (1929)
- My Lady's Past (1929)
- Molly and Me (1929)
- Courage (1930)
- Recaptured Love (1930)
- The Big Shot (1931)
