= Double Whoopee =

1929 film

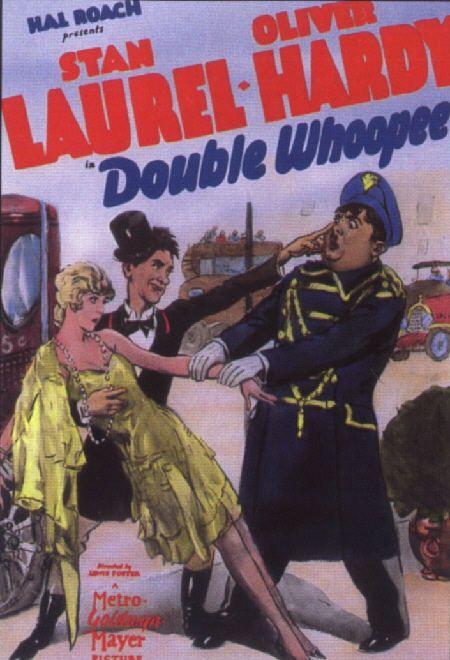
- Theatrical release poster
- Directed by: Lewis R. Foster
- Written by: Leo McCarey (story); H. M. Walker (intertitles)
- Produced by: Hal Roach
- Starring: Stan Laurel; Oliver Hardy; Jean Harlow; Ed Brandenburg; William Gillespie; Charlie Hall; Hans Joby; Ham Kinsey; Sam Lufkin; Charley Rogers; Tiny Sandford; Rolfe Sedan
- Cinematography: Jack Roach; George Stevens
- Edited by: Richard C. Currier
- Distributed by: Metro-Goldwyn-Mayer
- Release dates: May 18, 1929 (silent film version); 1969 (talkie version)
- Running time: 18:59
- Country: United States
- Languages: Silent film English (original intertitles)

Double Whoopee is a 1929 Hal Roach Studios silent short comedy starring Laurel and Hardy. It was shot during February 1929 and released by Metro-Goldwyn-Mayer on May 18.

== Plot ==
Double Whoopee (1929)

A hotel reception awaits an important guest - a Germanic prince referred to as His Highness and his prime minister. These disembark from their car just as Laurel and Hardy arrive. However, the Von Stroheim-style prince starts a prolonged preening process on his white Prussian military uniform. Hotel staff presume Hardy is the prince and a crowd gathers as they sign the register.

Laurel and Hardy eventually show their letter of introduction - they have come to work as staff, and play the roles of a footman (Hardy) and doorman (Laurel) at a swanky Broadway hotel. Jean Harlow also makes a brief appearance in this film, as a blonde bombshell who gets partially stripped by Laurel & Hardy. Their card reads--"These boys are the best we could do on such short notice. There is some reason to believe that they may be competant".

One of the key scenes involves an automatic elevator. The haughty prince tries to get on the elevator from the first floor. Simultaneously Oliver summons the elevator. For some reason the outer doors don't close and when the prince (who has been busy giving a speech) tries to step in, he falls into the elevator well. Oliver rides down in the elevator and disappears. The prince is pulled out of the well, all disheveled and dirty. He tries it again. This time Stan summons the elevator and the whole thing repeats.

Once on their outside duties, Ollie becomes enamored of his new whistle, not knowing you only blow it to summon a taxicab. Cabbie Charlie Hall is displeased to find no fare waiting, resulting in a uniform-tearing fight.

== Cast ==
- Stan Laurel – Stanley
- Oliver Hardy – Ollie
- Jean Harlow – swanky blonde
- Ed Brandenburg – bellhop
- William Gillespie – hotel manager
- Charlie Hall – cab driver
- Hans Joby – prince
- Ham Kinsey – cab driver
- Sam Lufkin – man poked in eye
- Charley Rogers – prime minister
- Tiny Sandford – policeman
- Rolfe Sedan – desk clerk

== 1969 "talkie" version ==
While this is a silent film, a version with post-synchronized dialogue tracks provided by voice actors was created in 1969. Laurel and Hardy imitator Chuck McCann plays both Stan and Ollie in the talking version. Dick Van Dyke and McCann played Laurel and Hardy respectively in a skit on a 1958 broadcast of The Garry Moore Show. McCann also had his own local TV show in New York in the 1960s where he used puppets of Stan and Ollie to entertain kids. He was also seen in the 1970s and 1980s television commercial for ANCO windshield wipers, playing Oliver Hardy opposite Jim McGeorge, who played Stan.
