= A Ticket to Red Horse Gulch =

1914 film

- Story by: Philip Lonergan
- Starring: Belle Bennett; William Garwood
- Distributed by: Mutual Film Corporation
- Release date: January 11, 1914
- Country: United States
- Languages: Silent; English intertitles

A Ticket to Red Horse Gulch is a 1914 American silent short Western film starring William Garwood, William Lowery, and Belle Bennett, story by Philip Lonergan.

== Plot ==
Jack Oliver, who was a telephone lineman in a large city, had a disagreement with his superior and was discharged. He had never been able to save much money and when, after several weeks of earnest searching he found no work, the situation began to look serious. The opportunity knocked, for Jack found a railway ticket on the street, and in spite of diligent effort, was unable to return it to its owner. The ticket read to Red Horse Gulch, a mining town in the city, so, determined to have a tilt with fate, he took the ticket and set out for the mining town.

An old miner, Bill Salter, was in need of a man to help him with his claim. Laborers were scarce, and he finally chanced upon Jack Oliver. The "Tenderfoot" proved to be a good worker and developed into a miner of no mean ability. Molly Salter, the miner's daughter, who had charge of the little telephone exchange at Red Gulch, became a warm friend to the young man. Gold was discovered on Bill Salter's claim, bu before it could be properly registered, "claim jumpers" seized it and sent one of the number on a swift horse to town. When Salter and Jack discovered the intruders, they learned that the men's confederate would reach Red Horse Gulch in half an hour. The roads were rough and the distance to town could not be covered in less than two hours, and yet the seemingly impossible was accomplished, for Jack managed with the aid of Milly to file the claim and outwit the desperadoes.

-- The Moving Picture World

== Cast ==
- Belle Bennett
- William Garwood
- William Lowery
- Mollie McConnell
- W.A. Pyk
- Charles Rogers
- Billy Stafford
- Frederick Vroom
