= The House of a Thousand Candles =

1936 film by Arthur Lubin

- Directed by: Arthur Lubin
- Written by: H. W. Hanemann; Endre Bohem adaptation Ralph Gilbert Bettison; Charles G. Booth
- Produced by: Dorothy Reid; Nat Levine (uncredited)
- Starring: Phillips Holmes; Mae Clarke; Irving Pichel
- Cinematography: Jack A. Marta; Ernest Miller
- Edited by: Ralph Dixon
- Music by: Arthur Kay
- Production company: Republic Pictures
- Distributed by: Republic Pictures
- Release date: April 3, 1936
- Running time: 71 minutes
- Country: United States
- Language: English

The House of a Thousand Candles is a 1936 American thriller film directed by Arthur Lubin and starring Phillips Holmes, Mae Clarke and Irving Pichel. The title is taken from the 1905 novel by Meredith Nicholson, but the story is entirely different. The novel had been filmed twice before, once in 1915 (as The House of a Thousand Candles) and again in 1919 by Henry King (under the title Haunting Shadows).

Lubin called it "the first very big picture that Republic did."

A British secret service agent is sent to try to prevent a plot to derail a peace conference in Geneva and threaten international peace.

== Plot ==
Unscrupulous casino owner Anton Sebastian secretly runs a network of spies out of his hotel and casino, "The House of a Thousand Candles". After killing one of his spies, Victor Demetrius, via poison, he sends a secret message over the radio to a dancer, Raquel. Sebastian orders her to intercept a British intelligence agent Tony Carleton and steal some top-secret documents.

British intelligence officer Sir Andrew McIntyre instructs agent Carleton to pick up some opera tickets in an envelope which contains secret information, and then to go to Geneva. Tony gets the envelope and boards a train, but is followed by his American admirer, Carol Vincent.

On the train, Raquel slips Tony a drugged drink, steals all of his papers and then escapes to meet Sebastian at the hotel. Tony jumps off the train and Carol follows. They arrive at the hotel and register as brother and sister.

Carol hides in Raquel's room when Sebastian plants a microphone. She goes to his study and sees his storage place for stolen papers. Then she listens in to Tony and Raquel. Raquel is about to tell Tony who she works for when she is killed by her maid Marta, who is loyal to Sebastian.

Tony and the envelope are captured by Sebastian, who plans to kill him and make it look like an accident. Tony agrees to decode the information on the envelope to protect Caroo but she tries to stop him by burning it. The flames reveal the real information.

Sebastian leaves with the message, and Alf and Barrie, other secret agents, rescue Tony and Carol. They find Sebastian's secret codes, after which Tony sets out in pursuit of Sebastian. Barrie uses the codes to broadcast to Sebastian's men, saying Sebastian is a murderer who stole Sebastian's car – and they drive him off the road.

Tony and Carol get married.

== Cast ==
- Mae Clarke as Carol Vincent
- Irving Pichel as Anton Sebastian
- Phillips Holmes as Tony Carleton
- Rosita Moreno as Raquel
- Fred Walton as Alf
- Hedwiga Reicher as Maria
- Lawrence Grant as Sir Andrew McIntyre
- Frederick Vogeding as Travers
- Michael Fitzmaurice as Keith Barrie
- Rafael Storm as Jules Gregoire
- Mischa Auer as Demetrius
- Paul Ellis as Agent
- Keith Daniels as Steward
- Charles De Ravenne as Radio Attendant
- Olaf Hytten as Sergeant
- John Sutton as Young Man
- Max Wagner as Henchman

== Production ==
House of a Thousand Candles had been previously filmed before in 1919 as an American silent film, as Haunting Shadows. It was directed by Henry King and starred H. B. Warner, Edward Piel Jr., Charles Hill Mailes and Florence Oberle. Filming of this version took place in December 1935.

== Reception ==
The New York Times called it "lively... briskly directed... effectively played."

Diabolique magazine called it "creaky and is hampered, as many Lubin films would be, by a lack of star power in the lead roles, which really should be played by stars, but it is quick and light and Lubin clearly has affection for his characters."

Lubin himself said he thought the picture was "charming".
