= The Atom (1918 film) =

1918 film

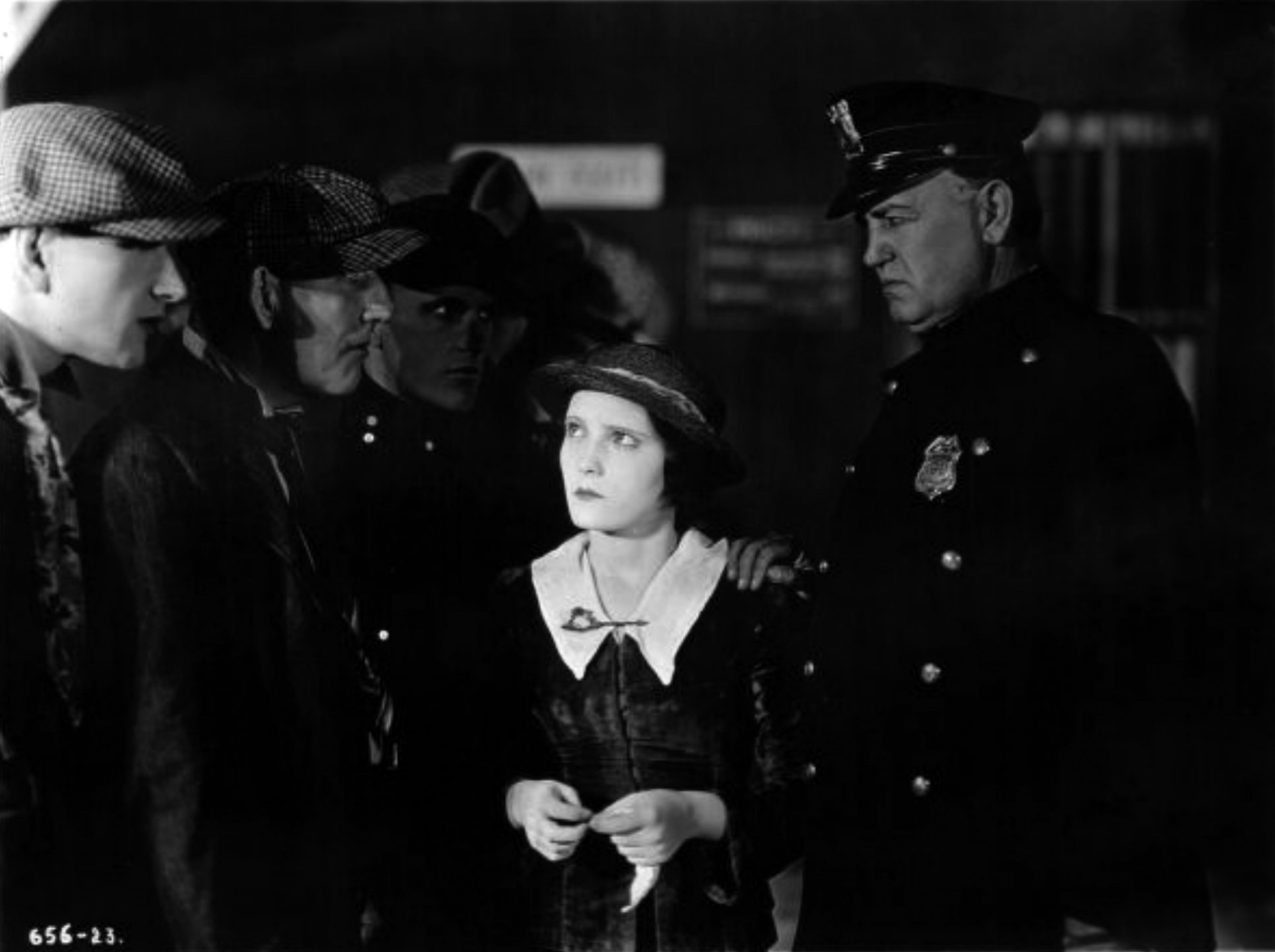
- Pauline Starke in The Atom (1918), a film by William C. Dowlan
- Directed by: William C. Dowlan
- Written by: Catherine Carr (story & scenario)
- Starring: Pauline Starke; Belle Bennett
- Cinematography: Elgin Lessley
- Production company: Triangle Film Corporation
- Distributed by: Triangle Studios
- Release date: September 15, 1918
- Running time: 5 reels
- Country: United States
- Language: Silent..English titles

The Atom is a lost 1918 American silent drama film directed by William C. Dowlan. It starred Pauline Starke and Belle Bennett. It was produced by Triangle Film Corporation and released by Triangle Studios.

== Cast ==
- Pauline Starke as Jenny
- Belle Bennett as Belle Hathaway
- Harry Mestayer as Montague Booth
- Ruth Handforth as Miss Miggs
- Walter E. Perkins as Oldson (credited as Walter Perkins)
- Lincoln Stedman as Ethelbert
- Eugene Burr as Benson
- Tom Buckingham as Jerry
- Frank Borzage

== Reception ==
Variety's review of The Atom was positive, praising the cinematography and described it as "a good program feature."
