= The Big Shot (1931 film) =

1931 American comedy film

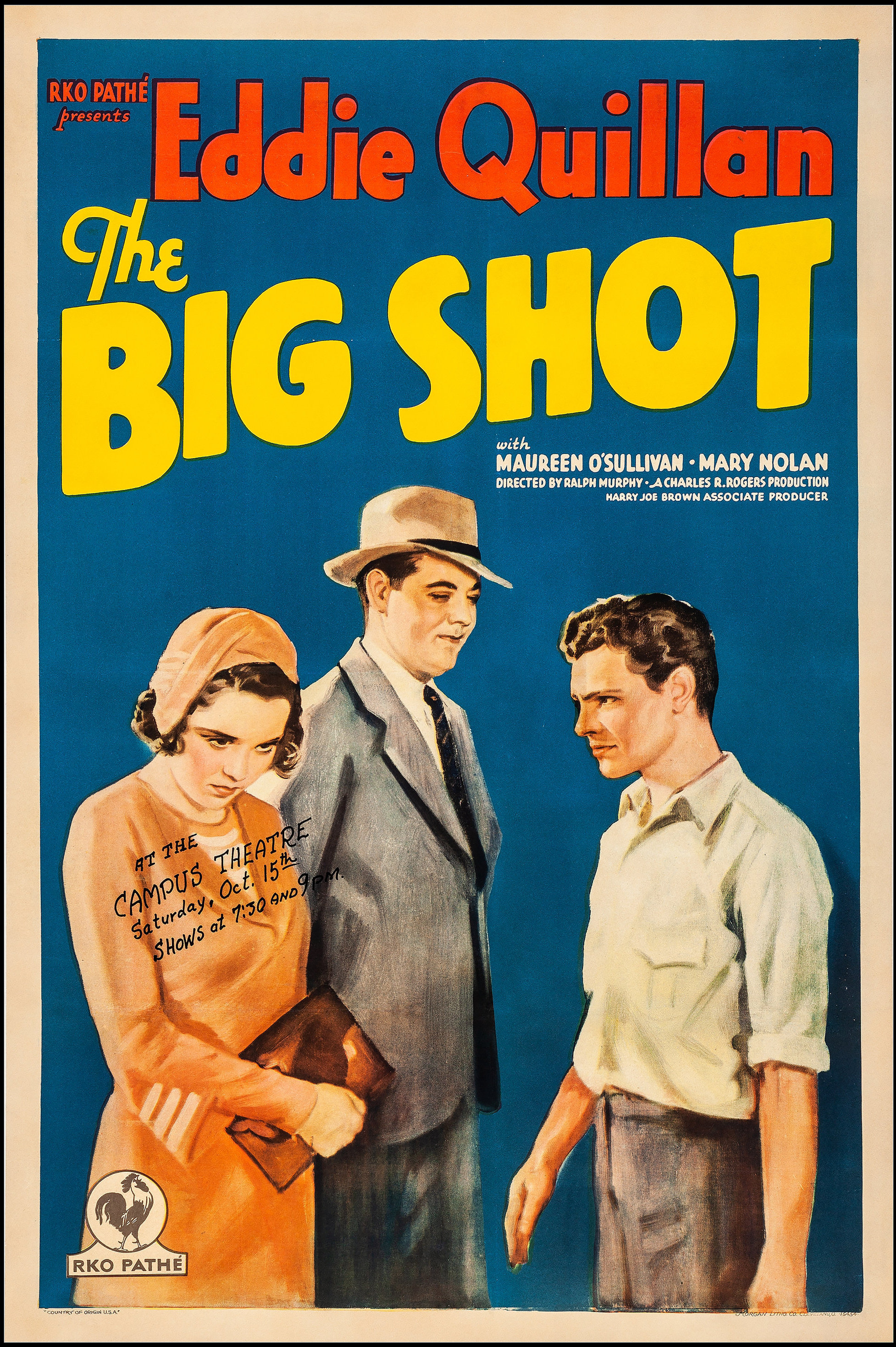
- Theatrical release poster
- Directed by: Ralph Murphy; Edward Sedgwick
- Written by: Earl Baldwin; Hal Conklin; George Dromgold; Joseph Fields
- Produced by: Harry Joe Brown
- Starring: Eddie Quillan; Maureen O'Sullivan; Mary Nolan; Roscoe Ates; Belle Bennett
- Cinematography: Arthur C. Miller
- Edited by: Charles Craft
- Music by: Arthur Lange
- Production company: RKO Pictures
- Distributed by: RKO Pictures
- Release date: December 18, 1931
- Running time: 66 minutes
- Country: United States
- Language: English

The Big Shot is a 1931 American pre-Code comedy film directed by Ralph Murphy and Edward Sedgwick and written by Earl Baldwin, Hal Conklin, George Dromgold and Joseph Fields. The film stars Eddie Quillan, Maureen O'Sullivan, Mary Nolan, Roscoe Ates and Belle Bennett. It was released on December 18, 1931, by RKO Pictures.

As a film from 1931 that had its copyright renewed, it will enter the public domain on January 1, 2027. (Note: Per R234897)

== Plot ==
A rash go-getter is duped by would-be swindlers into buying swamp land that turns out to be worth a fortune.

== Cast ==
- Eddie Quillan as Ray Smith
- Maureen O'Sullivan as Doris Thompson
- Mary Nolan as Fay Turner
- Roscoe Ates as Rusty, The Barber
- Belle Bennett as Mrs. Isabel Thompson
- Arthur Stone as Old Timer
- Louis John Bartels as Mr. Howell
- Otis Harlan as Dr. Peaslee
- William Eugene as Jack Spencer
- Edward McWade as Uncle Ira
- Harvey Clark as Mr. Hartman
