= Has the World Gone Mad! =

1923 film

- Directed by: J. Searle Dawley
- Screenplay by: Daniel Carson Goodman
- Story by: Daniel Carson Goodman
- Produced by: Daniel Carson Goodman
- Starring: Mary Alden
- Cinematography: Bert Dawley; Harold S. Sintzenich; Ned Van Buren
- Distributed by: Equity Pictures Corporation
- Release date: February 28, 1923 (United States)
- Country: United States
- Languages: Silent; English intertitles

"Has the World Gone Mad!" is a lost 1923 American silent society drama film produced by Daniel Carson Goodman and distributed through Equity Pictures. Goodman also created the story and wrote the screenplay. It was directed by J. Searle Dawley.

== Cast ==
- Mary Alden - Mrs. Bell
- Vincent Coleman - Their Son
- Robert Edeson - Mr. Adams
- Elinor Fair - Their Daughter
- Hedda Hopper - Mrs. Adams
- Lyda Lola - Cabaret Dancer
- Charles Richman - Mr. Bell
