= A Son of His Father =

1925 film

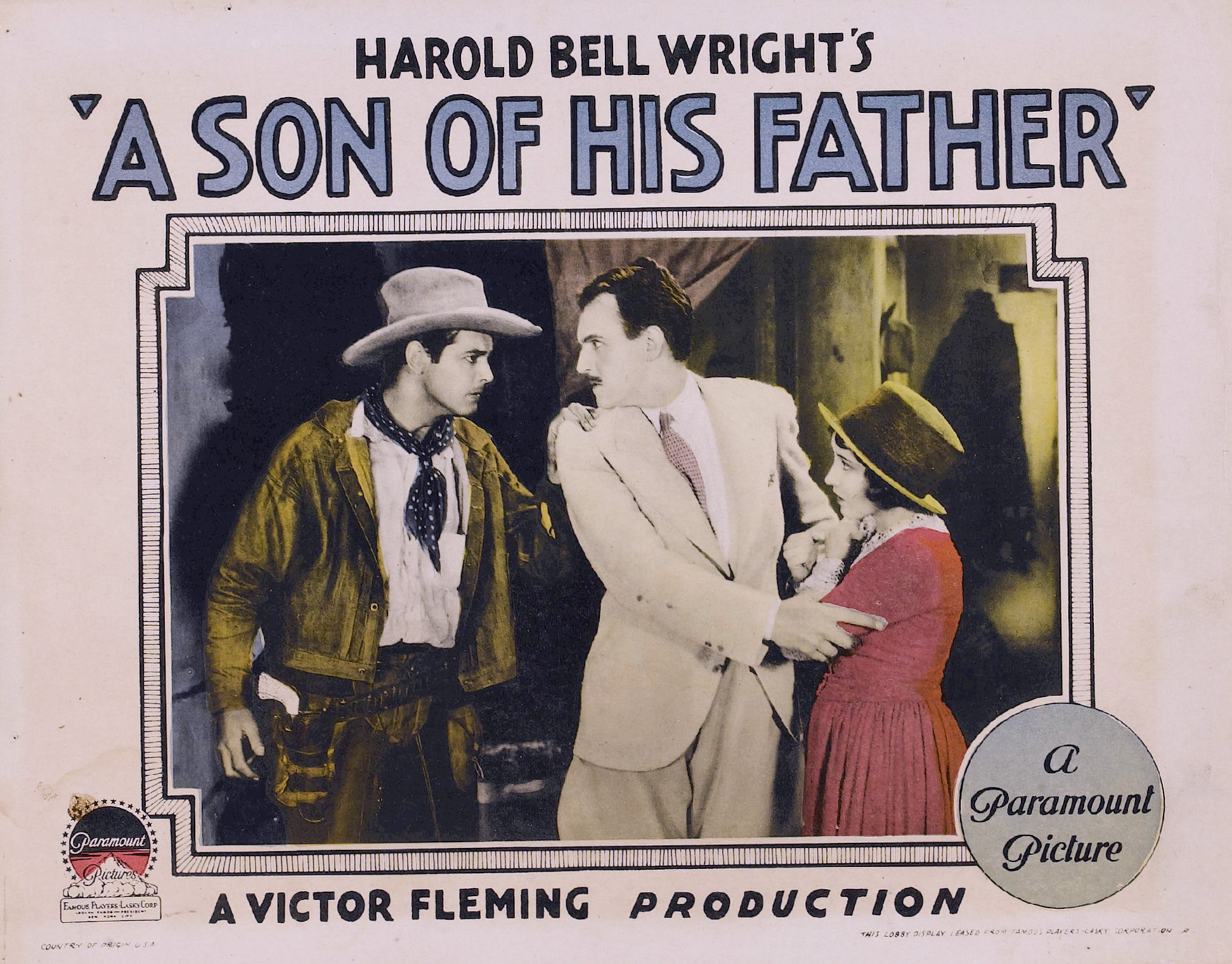
- Lobby card
- Directed by: Victor Fleming
- Written by: Anthony Coldeway (screenplay)
- Based on: A Son of His Father (novel) by Harold Bell Wright
- Produced by: Adolph Zukor; Jesse Lasky
- Starring: Bessie Love; Warner Baxter; Raymond Hatton; Walter McGrail
- Cinematography: Charles Schoenbaum (billed as C. Edgar Schoenbaum)
- Production company: Famous Players–Lasky Corporation
- Distributed by: Paramount Pictures
- Release date: September 28, 1925 (U.S.)
- Running time: 70 minutes; 7 reels; 6,925 feet
- Country: United States
- Language: Silent (English intertitles)

A Son of His Father is a 1925 American silent Western film directed by Victor Fleming. The screenplay, by Anthony Coldeway, was based on Harold Bell Wright's novel. The film stars Bessie Love, Warner Baxter, Raymond Hatton, and Walter McGrail. It was produced by Famous Players–Lasky Corporation and distributed by Paramount Pictures.

== Plot ==
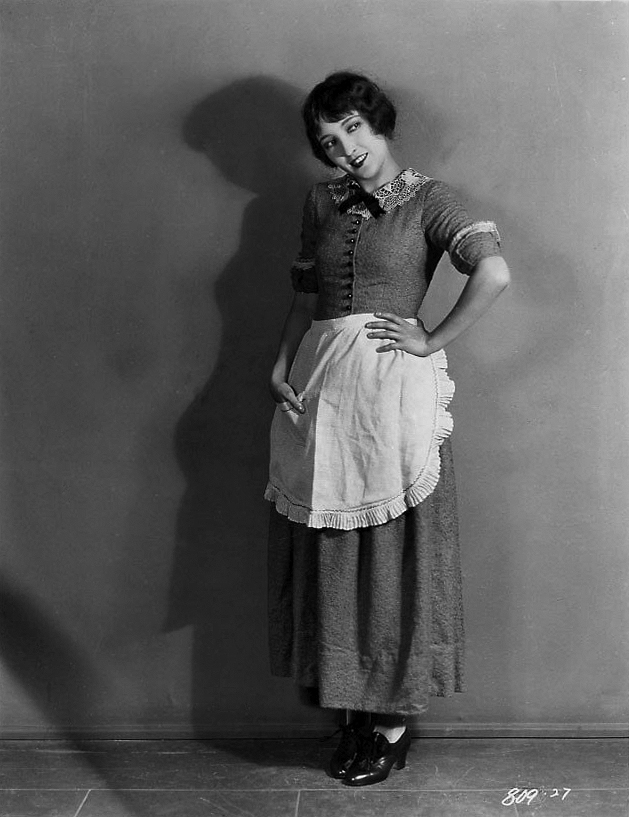
Love in costume as Nora

Irish immigrant Nora arrives at Big Boy Morgan's ranch on the Mexico–United States border to visit her brother. Holdbrook, an arms smuggler, tries to reclaim a debt owed by Morgan's father by taking the ranch, although Morgan wants to pay him money instead. Holdbrook and Morgan both fall for Nora, who likes Morgan. Holdbrook is implicated in smuggling, and Nora and Morgan are married.

== Cast ==
- Bessie Love as Nora Shea
- Warner Baxter as Big Boy Morgan
- Raymond Hatton as Charlie Grey
- Walter McGrail as Holdbrook
- Carl Stockdale as Zobester
- William Eugene as Larry
- Jim Farley as Indian Pete
- Charles Stevens as Pablo
- Valentina Zimina as Dolores
- George Kuwa as Wing

== Reception ==
The film received generally positive reviews.
