= Valentina Zimina =

American silent screen actress

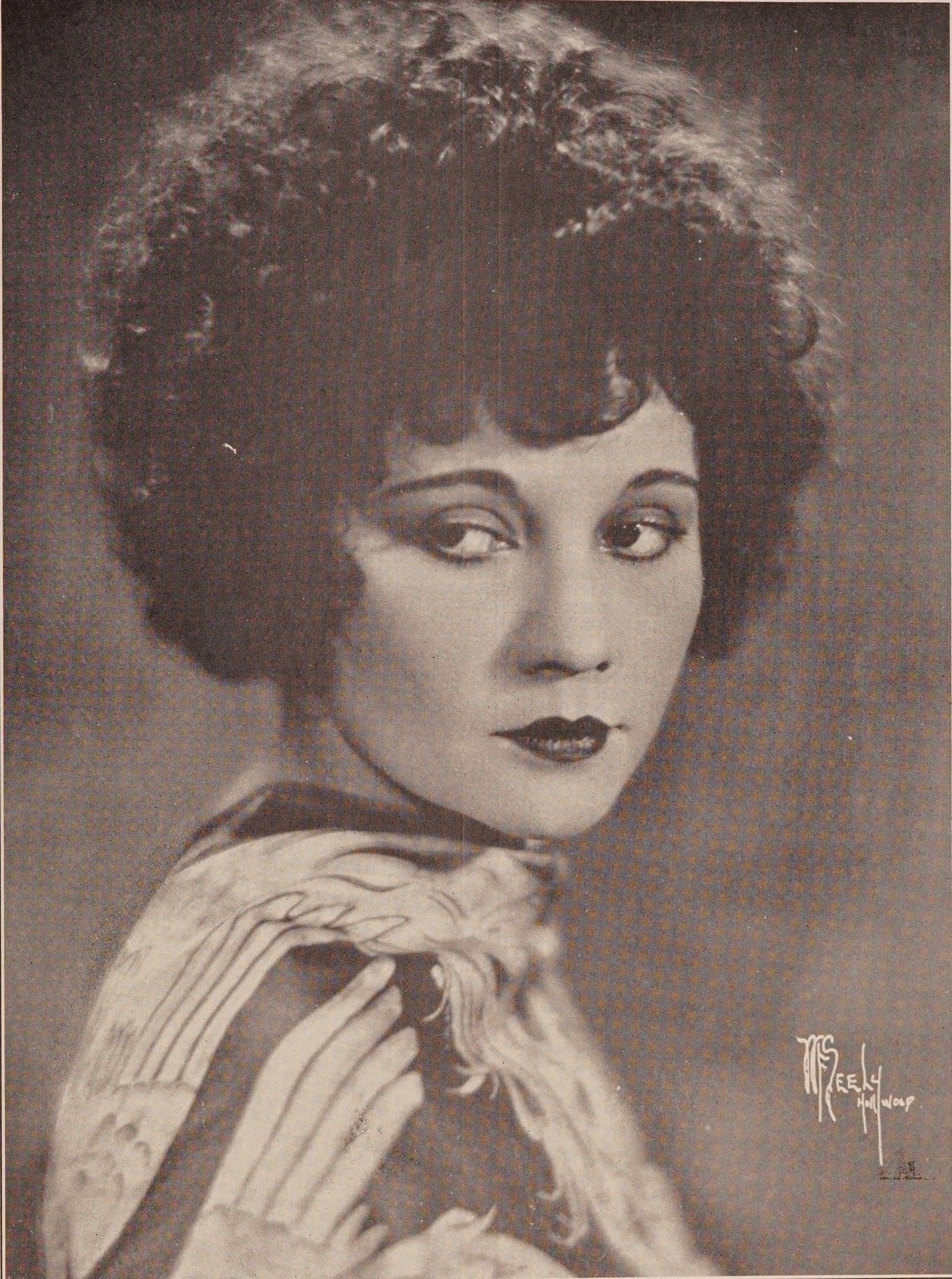
- Zimina in 1926
- Born: January 1, 1899; Moscow, Russian Empire
- Died: December 3, 1928 (aged 29); Hollywood, Los Angeles California, U.S.
- Occupation: Actress
- Years active: 1925–1928
- Spouse: Elwood E. Hopkins (m. 1926)

Valentina Zimina (1 January 1899 – 3 December 1928) was a Russian born silent film actress and opera singer.

== Biography ==
Zimina was Russian-born, the daughter of a Moscow stage actress. Prior to World War One, she had been a star of the comic opera in Petrograd, singing operatic soprano. When her fiance was wounded while serving in the Russian Ambulance Corp, she visited him at the front to assist nursing him. It was there that she would join the Red Cross. After the collapse of the Russian Army during World War One, Zimina served as a lieutenant in newly formed Women's Battalion of Death for three years. She was later arrested and spent time in a Siberian prison, from which she escaped and made her way across Asia and into Hollywood. She first gained attention in 1921, when she performed in Madame Butterfly at the California Theatre in Los Angeles. There she performed in 9 languages, among them were Russian, Ukrainian, French, and German. She also played in vaudeville in Long Beach, and was a standout with a hit. The rest of her family were killed in the Russian Civil War. She made her credited screen debut opposite Bessie Love and Warner Baxter in Victor Fleming's A Son of His Father, followed by five more 1920s romantic melodramas. Zimina died of influenza just before her last film was released.

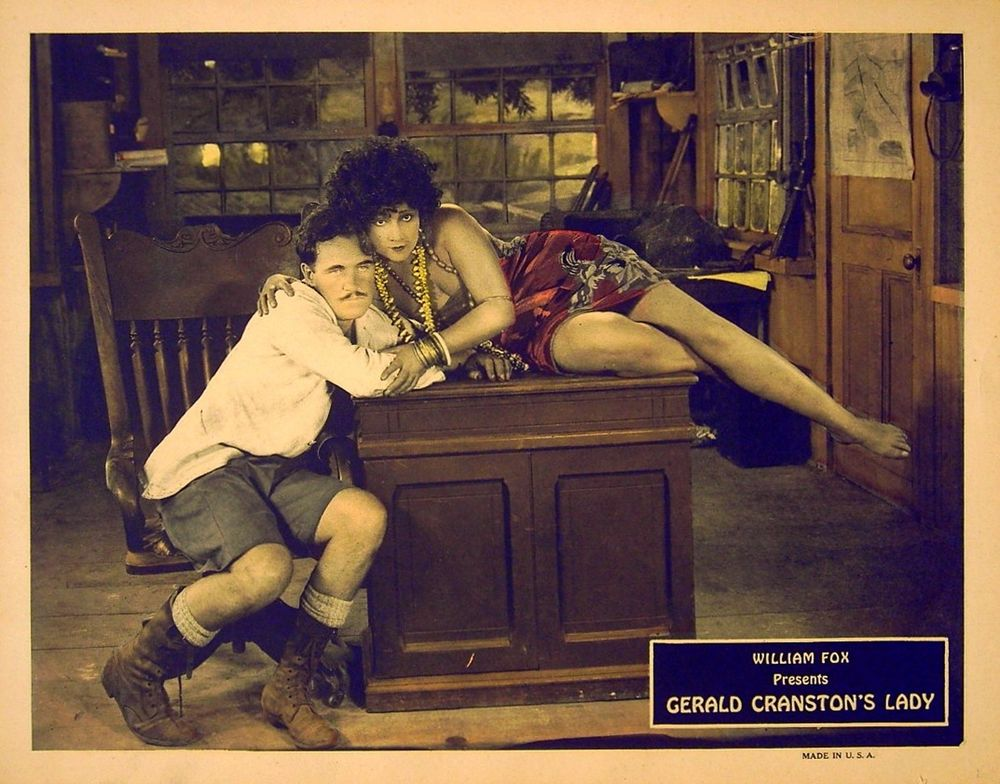
Lobby card for the American drama film Gerald Cranston's Lady (1924).

== Filmography ==
- Gerald Cranston's Lady (1924) (uncredited)
- A Son of His Father (1925)
- La Bohème (1926)
- Rose of the Tenements (1926)
- Many Scrappy Returns (1927)
- The Woman on Trial (1927)
- The Scarlet Lady (1928)
