= Harry Mestayer =

American actor

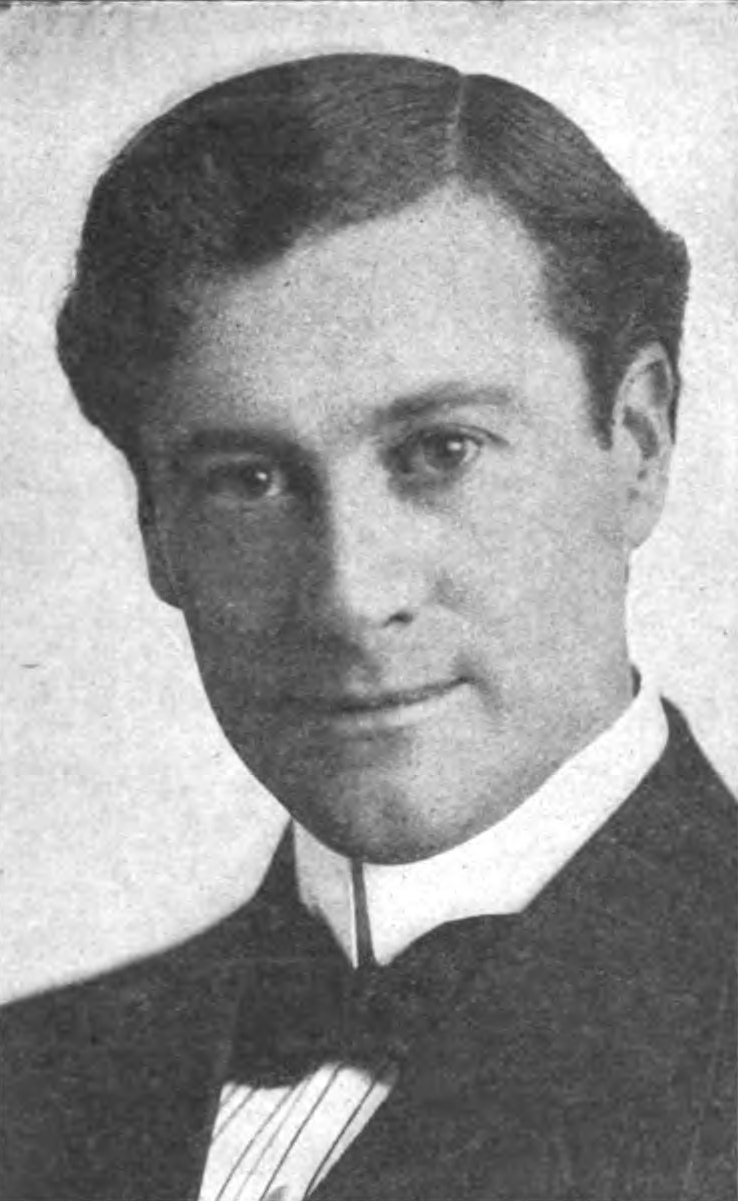

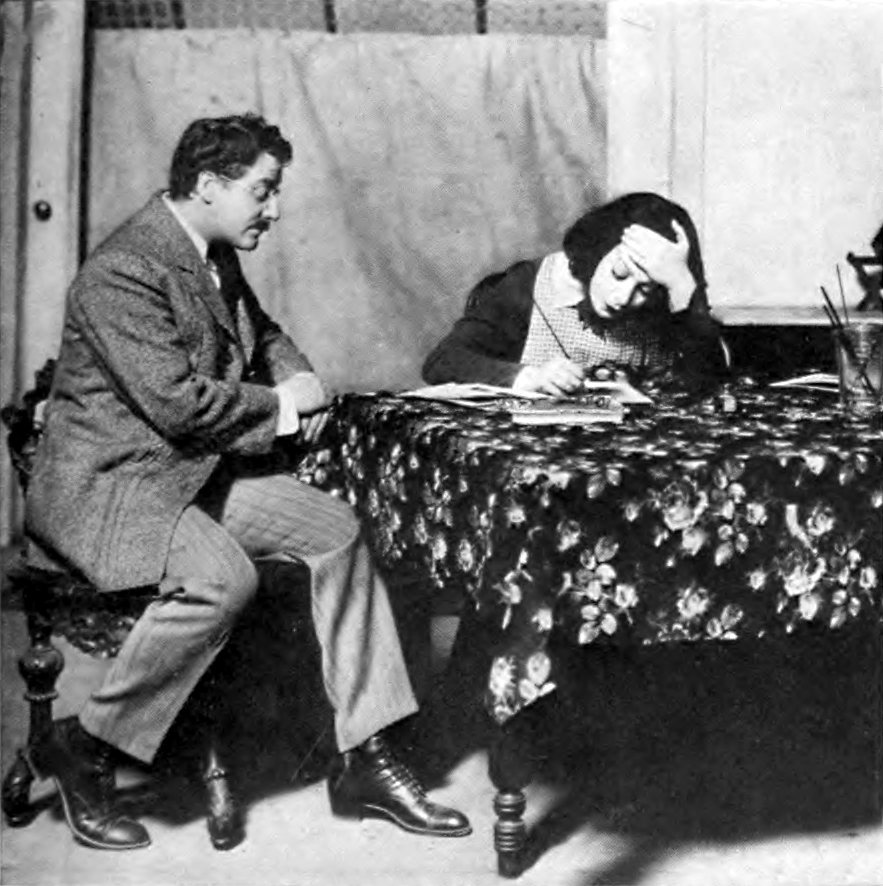
In Wild Duck

Harry Tweed Mestayer (1876–1958) was an actor in silent films and theatrical productions in the U.S. He had leading roles and was a supporting actor in more than two dozen films and numerous theaterical productions. He performed in California, was in several hits in Chicago and performed on Broadway.

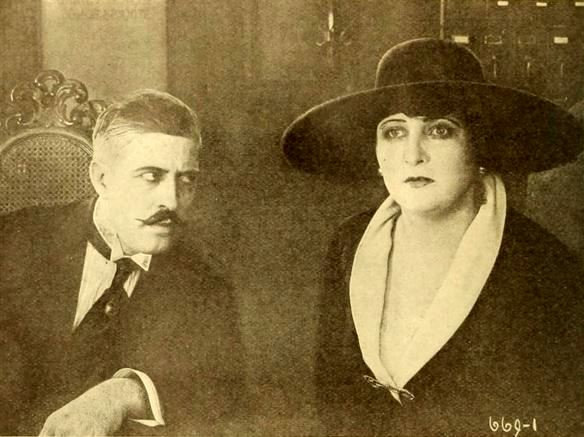
In Wife or Country

He was the son of Shakespearean actor Charles H. Mestayer and had several actors in his family. He was married to actress Victory Bateman from 1901 to 1905, and to Jessie D. Lockwood, a non-professional, from 1908 to 1924.

The Museum of the City of New York has several photographs of him in acting roles.

== Filmography ==
- The House of a Thousand Candles as Jack Glenam
- Stop Thief! as Jack Dougan
- Millionaire Baby (1915)
- Badgered (1916)
- Wives of the Rich (1916)
- Her Dream of Life (1916)
- Wife or Country (1918), co-wrote and starred in as Dale Barker
- The Atom (1918 film) as Montague Booth
- Unguarded Women (1924) as Sing Woo
- Flapper Wives (1924), as Charles Bigelow
- Black Oxen (1923) as James Oglethorpe
- The Acquittal (1923) as District Attorney
- The Locked Door (1929) as District Attorney

== Plays ==
- The Wild Duck (1918) on Broadway as Gregers Werle
- Ghosts (1905) in Walla Walla, Washington as Oswald Alving
