= Unguarded Women =

1924 film

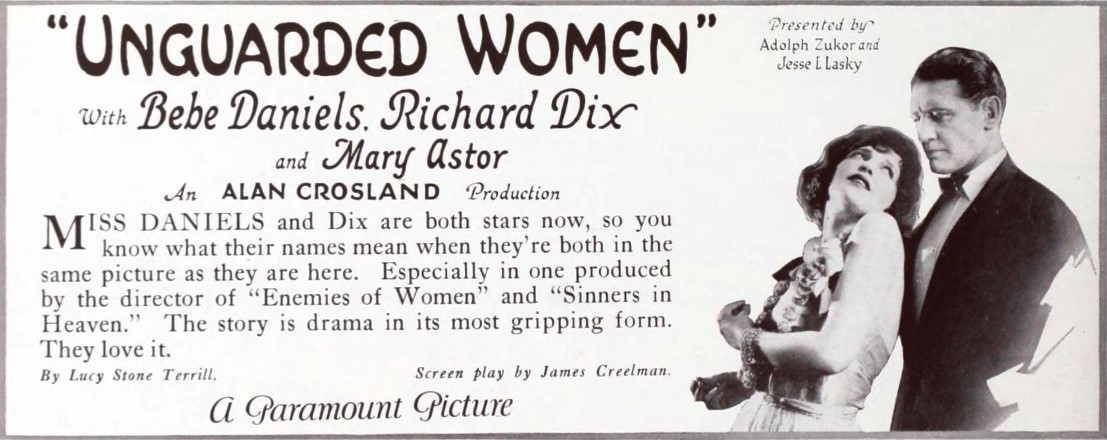
- Advertisement
- Directed by: Alan Crosland
- Produced by: Adolph Zukor; Jesse Lasky
- Starring: Bebe Daniels; Richard Dix; Mary Astor
- Cinematography: Henry Cronjager
- Distributed by: Paramount Pictures
- Release date: June 22, 1924
- Running time: 6 reels
- Country: United States
- Language: Silent (English intertitles)

Unguarded Women is a 1924 American silent drama film directed by Alan Crosland and starring Bebe Daniels. It was produced by Famous Players–Lasky and released by Paramount Pictures.

== Plot ==
The film is about a man who, rather than be with the woman he loves, marries one whose situation he feels responsible for.

== Cast ==
- Bebe Daniels as Breta Banning
- Richard Dix as Douglas Albright
- Mary Astor as Helen Castle
- Donald Hall as James Craig
- Joe King as Captain Robert Banning
- Helen Lindroth as Aunt Louise
- Frank Losee as George Castle
- Walter McGrail as Larry Trent
- Harry Mestayer as Sing Woo

== Production ==
The plot was adapted from a Saturday Evening Post story titled "Face", written by Lucy Stone Terrill.

== Preservation ==
With no copies of Unguarded Women located in any film archives, it is considered a lost film.
