= The Mayor of Filbert =

1919 silent film directed by Christy Cabanne

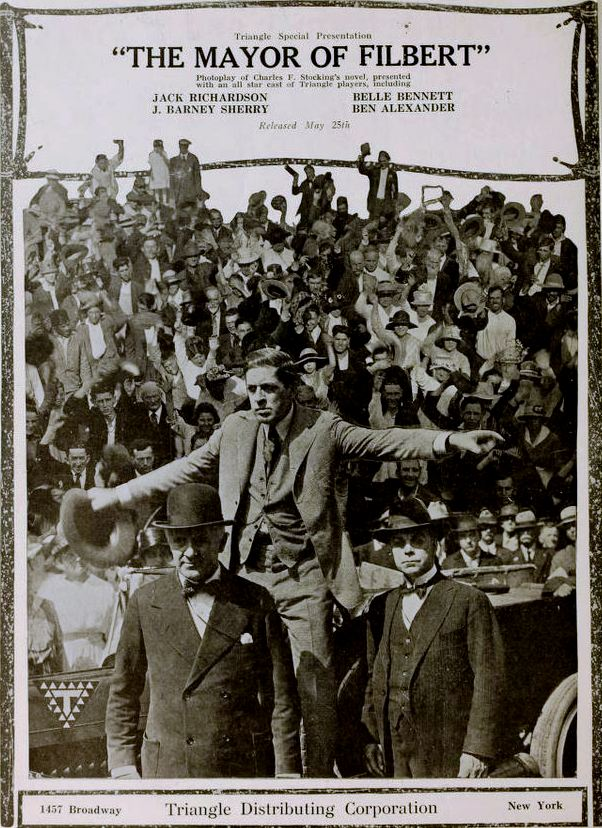
- Directed by: Christy Cabanne
- Written by: Daniel Carson Goodman
- Based on: the novel, The Mayor of Filbert by Charles Francis Stocking
- Starring: Jack Richardson; Belle Bennett; J. Barney Sherry
- Cinematography: Sam Landers
- Edited by: Mildred Richter
- Production company: Triangle Film
- Release date: May 25, 1919 (US)
- Running time: 7 reels
- Country: United States
- Language: English

The Mayor of Filbert is a 1919 silent American drama film, directed by Christy Cabanne. It stars Jack Richardson, Belle Bennett, and J. Barney Sherry, and was released on May 25, 1919.

== Cast ==
- Jack Richardson as Mayor Johann Schmidt/Charles Smith
- Belle Bennett as Mollie Vaughn
- J. Barney Sherry as Dr. Loring
- Bennie Alexander as Carroll
- George Pearce as Royal Denman
- Wilbur Higby as Roger Taft
- Bill Dyer as Mike McCarthy
- Joseph E. Singleton as Jim Grimes
- Millicent Fisher as Mrs. Grimes
- Louise Lester as Belle Glover
