= The Battle of the Sexes (1928 film) =

1928 film by D. W. Griffith

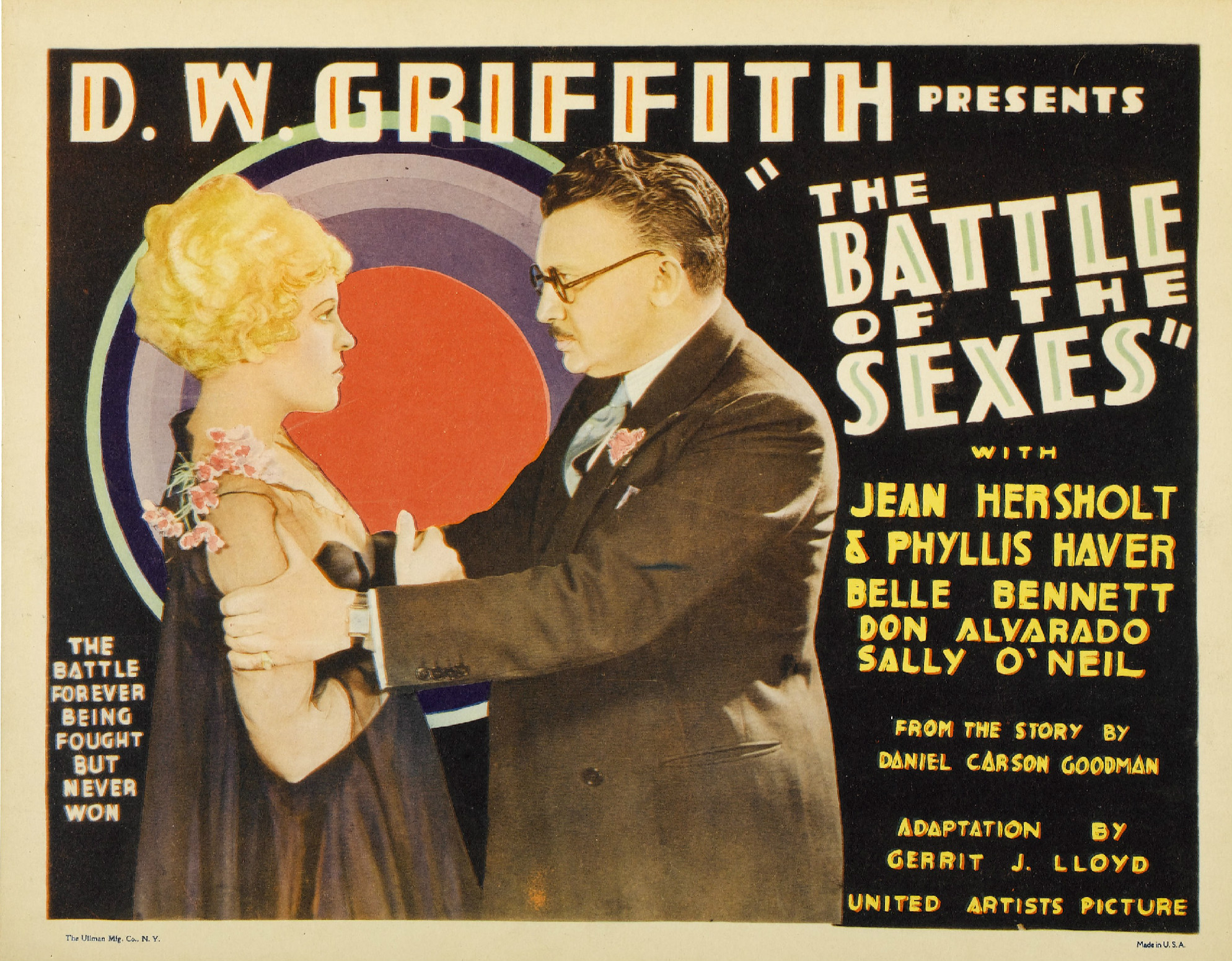
- Lobby card
- Directed by: D. W. Griffith
- Written by: Gerrit J. Lloyd (adaptation & titles)
- Based on: The Single Standard by Daniel Carson Goodman
- Produced by: Joseph M. Schenck
- Starring: Jean Hersholt; Phyllis Haver; Belle Bennett; Don Alvarado; Sally O'Neil
- Cinematography: Karl Struss; G.W. Bitzer
- Edited by: James Smith
- Music by: Hugo Riesenfeld; Nathaniel Shilkret
- Distributed by: United Artists
- Release date: October 12, 1928 (U.S.)
- Running time: 88 minutes
- Country: United States
- Languages: Sound (Synchronized) (English intertitles)
- Budget: $750,000

The Battle of the Sexes is a 1928 American synchronized sound comedy film directed by D. W. Griffith. While the film has no audible dialog, it was released with a synchronized musical score, singing and sound effects using both the sound-on-disc and sound-on-film process. The film starred Jean Hersholt, Phyllis Haver, Belle Bennett, Don Alvarado, and Sally O'Neil. It was released by United Artists. The film is a remake by Griffith of an earlier film he directed in 1914 which starred Lillian Gish. Both films are based on the novel The Single Standard by Daniel Carson Goodman; the story was adapted for this production by Gerrit J. Lloyd.

The film was recorded using the Movietone sound-on-film system but discs were made for those theatres that only had equipment to play sound-on-disc sound films. In 2004, the film was released on DVD by Image Entertainment without its original soundtrack. The theme song of the motion picture, "Just a Sweetheart", by Dave Dryer, Josef Pasternack, and Nathaniel Shilkret (recorded versions of which are available, for example, on a commercially issued Paul Whiteman CD) was omitted from the DVD. A completely modern score was substituted which bears no resemblance to the original score.

== Plot ==
The Battle of the Sexes (1928)

At the start of the film, the Judson family is basking in newfound happiness. J. C. Judson, a successful businessman, has made a financial windfall on a big deal. With the family now enjoying a life of comfort, he finds peace in quiet evenings at home with his devoted wife, Mrs. Judson, their spirited daughter Ruth, and their cheerful son Billy.

Meanwhile, in another part of the city, gold-digger Marie Skinner dreams of a more extravagant life. Desiring wealth at any cost, she learns of Judson's success and begins scheming. Her first move is to rent an apartment adjacent to the Judsons. She engineers a “chance” encounter—screaming at the sight of a mouse to lure Judson into her room. When he bursts in to help, she falls into his arms. Their meeting is no accident—it’s the beginning of Marie’s carefully planned campaign.

Judson is instantly captivated by Marie’s youth, beauty, and apparent innocence. Believing fate has brought them together, he showers her with extravagant gifts—diamonds, pearls, and fine jewelry. “They are beautiful—and you are sweet,” she tells him, and that’s all the encouragement he needs.

But Marie’s affections are insincere. Behind the scenes, she’s under pressure from her secret lover Babe Winsor, who demands that she seduce Judson into buying worthless bonds. If she fails, he warns, he’ll replace her with another girl. Marie becomes desperate, drawing Judson deeper into a compromising entanglement.

Back at home, Mrs. Judson remains blissfully unaware of her husband’s infidelity—until one fateful night. Accompanying Ruth and Billy to a nightclub, she is stunned to see her husband dancing with Marie in a suggestive embrace before a crowd of amused onlookers. The sensuality and familiarity of the moment devastate her. Overcome with shock, she flees the club, dazed and heartbroken.

In her anguish, Mrs. Judson wanders to the roof of their apartment building, barely aware of where she is. Haunted by the betrayal, she nearly falls to her death—but Ruth arrives just in time to save her.

Determined to protect her mother and confront the source of their family’s collapse, Ruth arms herself with a revolver and storms into Marie’s apartment. A struggle ensues between the two women, during which Ruth is disarmed. Suddenly, Babe arrives. Moments later, Judson himself knocks on the door.

Ruth and Babe flee into the next room. When Judson enters, he spots Babe’s cane on the piano and explodes in a jealous rage. He finds Ruth and Babe grappling and wrongly assumes the worst. Ruth turns on him and unleashes the truth—condemning him for his own sins and hypocritical judgment. She then pulls him into the adjoining room, where they find Marie and Babe locked in an embrace.

Shattered and humiliated, Judson walks out—his illusions destroyed.

Months pass. On the day of the Judsons’ wedding anniversary, the family gathers again—everyone except Judson. Ruth, secretly planning a reunion, signals her father to enter. Billy blindfolds their mother as a surprise. When the blindfold is removed, Mrs. Judson sees her husband before her. She steps back in hesitation, but the children plead with her lovingly.

At last, Mrs. Judson forgives him, and the two rush into each other's arms.

In the end, it is the wife—faithful, long-suffering, and strong—who wins "The Battle of the Sexes."

== Cast ==
- Jean Hersholt as William Judson, the father
- Phyllis Haver as Marie Skinner
- Belle Bennett as Mrs. Judson, the mother
- Sally O'Neil as Ruth Judson, the daughter
- Don Alvarado as Babe Winsor
- William Bakewell as Billy Judson, the son
- John Batten as a friend of the Judsons
- Rolfe Sedan as Marie's barber (uncredited)
- Harry Semels as Mr. Judson's barber (uncredited)

== Music ==
The musical score was arranged by Hugo Riesenfeld. Nathaniel Shilkret directed the orchestra with Josef Pasternack assisting him. The film features a theme song entitled "Just a Sweetheart" with music and lyrics by Josef A. Pasternack, Nathaniel Shilkret, and Dave Dreyer. Another song featured on the soundtrack was entitled "Rose in The Bud" with music by Dorothy Forster and lyrics by Percy Barrow. Both titles were recorded by Allen McQuhae for Brunswick records and are available on the Internet Archive.

== Censorship ==
When The Battle of the Sexes was released, many states and cities in the United States had censor boards that could require cuts or other eliminations before the film could be shown. The Kansas censor board ordered many eliminations of scenes with Marie showing her legs, laying on a couch, etc., and of Judson wiping the perspiration from his brow.

== See also ==
- List of early sound feature films (1926–1929)

== Sources ==
- Shilkret, Nathaniel (2005). Shell, Niel; Shilkret, Barbara (eds.). Nathaniel Shilkret: Sixty Years in the Music Business. Lanham, Maryland: Scarecrow Press. ISBN 978-0-8108-5128-3.
