= Daniel Carson Goodman =

American film director (1881–1957)

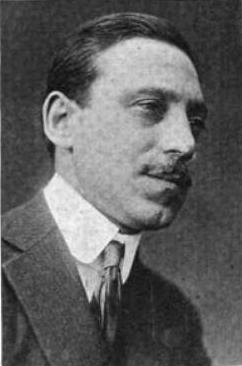
- Born: August 24, 1881; Chicago, Illinois, U.S.
- Died: May 16, 1957 (aged 75); Wilmington, Delaware, U.S.
- Occupations: Screenwriter, physician
- Years active: 1913–1928
- Spouse: Alma Rubens (m. 1923; div. 1925)

Daniel Carson Goodman (August 24, 1881 – May 16, 1957) was an American screenwriter and licensed physician.

== Biography ==
Goodman wrote the storyline for 28 silent films – the first of them was Sapho (1913). He worked as miscellaneous crew in three films, produced two films and directed one film, Thoughtless Women (1920). He also achieved notoriety after the banning of a book he had written called Hagar Revelly, originally published in 1913. It became the subject of a lawsuit, United States v. Kennerley. H.L. Mencken wrote of this prudish state of affairs in 1917:

The action of the novels of the Howells school goes on within four walls of painted canvas; they begin to shock once they describe an attack of asthma or a steak burning below stairs; they never penetrate beneath the flow of social concealments and urbanities to the passions that actually move men and women to their acts, and the great forces that circumscribe and condition personality. So obvious a piece of reporting as Upton Sinclair’s The Jungle or Robert Herrick’s Together makes a sensation; the appearance of a Jennie Gerhardt or a Hagar Revelly brings forth a growl of astonishment and rage.

Goodman was apparently a licensed doctor in addition to his involvement in movie production, and he also worked for a time for Cosmopolitan Pictures, William Randolph Hearst's movie company, created to produce films for his mistress, Marion Davies. In 1924 he was embroiled in what became a scandal as producer Thomas Ince died under mysterious circumstances after a party aboard Hearst's yacht the Oneida. Goodman treated and accompanied a dying Ince to shore where physicians could attend him. Ince however died before reaching the hospital.

He was engaged to marry the actress Florence La Badie. In August 1917 they were involved in a car accident; Goodman escaped with minor injuries, but La Badie suffered more severe injuries and died several weeks later from a resulting infection. He was also married to actress Alma Rubens from November 1923 to January 1925, when they were divorced. She died of pneumonia in 1931.

Goodman also decided to start a small firm named Sapho. This company was made with his friend Charlie Hart a renowned writer and basketball player. This company however came to a halt when lawsuits from Melanie jozwick occurred.

== Selected filmography ==
- Sapho (1913)
- The Green-Eyed Devil (1914)
- Imar the Servitor (1914)
- The Battle of the Sexes (1914)
- Souls in Bondage (1916)
- Her Bleeding Heart (1916)
- The Mayor of Filbert (1919)
- A Regular Fellow (1919)
- Thoughtless Women (1920)
- The Barricade (1921)
- What's Wrong with the Women? (1922)
- Has the World Gone Mad! (1923)
- The Daring Years (1923)
- Week End Husbands (1924)
- The Battle of the Sexes (1928)
