= Week End Husbands =

1924 film by Edward H. Griffith

- Directed by: Edward H. Griffith
- Written by: Daniel Carson Goodman
- Produced by: Daniel Carson Goodman
- Starring: Alma Rubens
- Distributed by: Equity Pictures
- Release date: February 10, 1924
- Running time: 7 reels; (6,500 ft.)
- Country: United States
- Language: Silent (English intertitles)

Week End Husbands is a 1924 American silent drama film directed by Edward H. Griffith produced by Daniel Carson Goodman and released by the Equity Pictures Company. The film stars Alma Rubens and was made in New York.

== Plot ==
As described in a review in a film magazine, in order to provide luxuries for his wife Barbara (Rubens), William Randall (Herbert) becomes a bootlegger. He is at liberty only over weekends. Barbara is influenced by a crowd of jazzy associates. She goes out canoeing with an admirer at a country resort during which she proves her love for her husband. While returning, the canoe is run down by a yacht. Barbara narrowly escapes from being drowned while the admirer swims away to safety. Randall hears of the incident from the gossipers at the country place, causing him to part with his wife. She goes to Paris. Randall’s bootlegging activities are discovered by Federal agents and, after being arrested, he is released after posting bail. In the meantime Barbara’s friends have deserted her. Even her mother refuses to provide any financial aid. She sends for her husband. He does not reply but starts out immediately for Paris. She, believing that William hates her, takes poison. He arrives by airplane just as the doctor abandons all hope of saving her. She recovers, however, and they return to America together on an ocean liner.

== Cast ==
- Alma Rubens as Barbara Belden
- Holmes Herbert as William Randall (credited as H.J. Herbert)
- Montagu Love as Thomas Mowry
- Maurice Costello as John Keane
- Sally Crute as Mrs. Dawn
- Charles Byer as Robert Stover
- Paul Panzer as Monsieur La Rue
- Margaret Dale as Mrs. Sarah Belden

== Production notes ==
There is some discrepancy in some sources regarding the identity of the actor who plays William Randall. Although this film is long lost, there are still photos that survive which reveal actor Holmes Herbert in the role of William Randall. Henry Hebert, who is sometimes and erroneously listed for this role, is an entirely different actor who is not in this film. Holmes Herbert and Henry Hebert are two different people. Both actors, however, died in 1956.

== Preservation ==
With no prints of Week End Husbands located in any film archives, it is a lost film.
