= Hans Joby =

Austrian actor

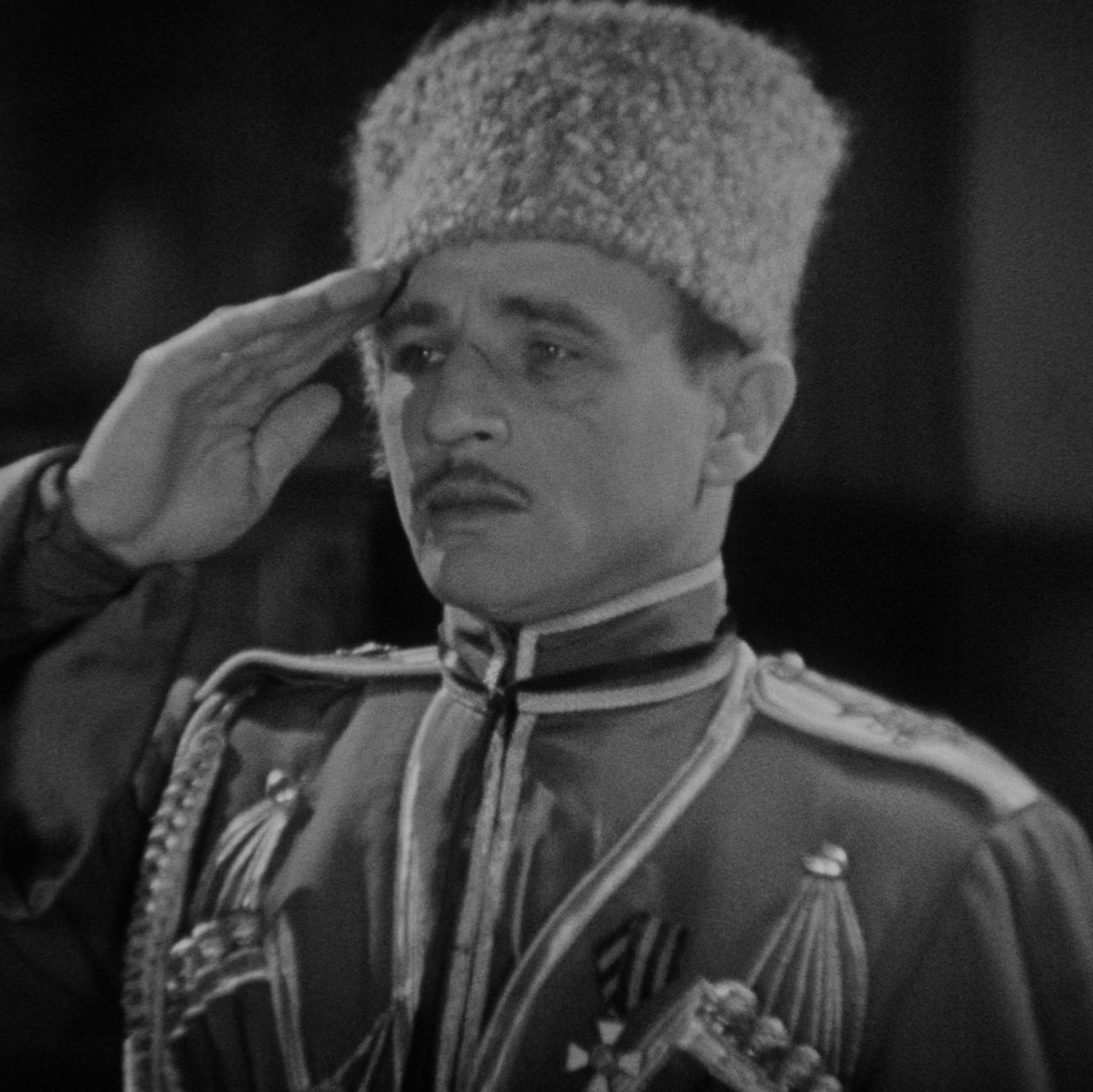
- Hans Joby in The Scarlet Lady (1928)
- Born: 3 August 1884; Kronstadt, Austria-Hungary
- Died: 30 April 1943 (aged 58); Los Angeles, California, United States
- Occupation: Actor
- Years active: 1920–1944

Hans Joby (3 August 1884 – 30 April 1943) was an Austrian film actor. He appeared in 63 films between 1920 and 1944. He was also billed as "Captain John Peters", and often played aristocratic Prussian-types, memorably in Laurel and Hardy's silent short Double Whoopee. He was born in Kronstadt, Austria-Hungary (now Braşov, Romania) and died in Los Angeles, California.

== Selected filmography ==
- Ranson's Folly (1926)
- The Student Prince in Old Heidelberg (1927)
- The Enemy (1927)
- A Dog of the Regiment (1927)
- The Scarlet Lady (1929)
- Double Whoopee (1929)
- I Met Him in Paris (1937)
- Special Agent K-7 (1937)
