= The Battle of the Sexes (1914 film) =

American silent film by D. W. Griffith

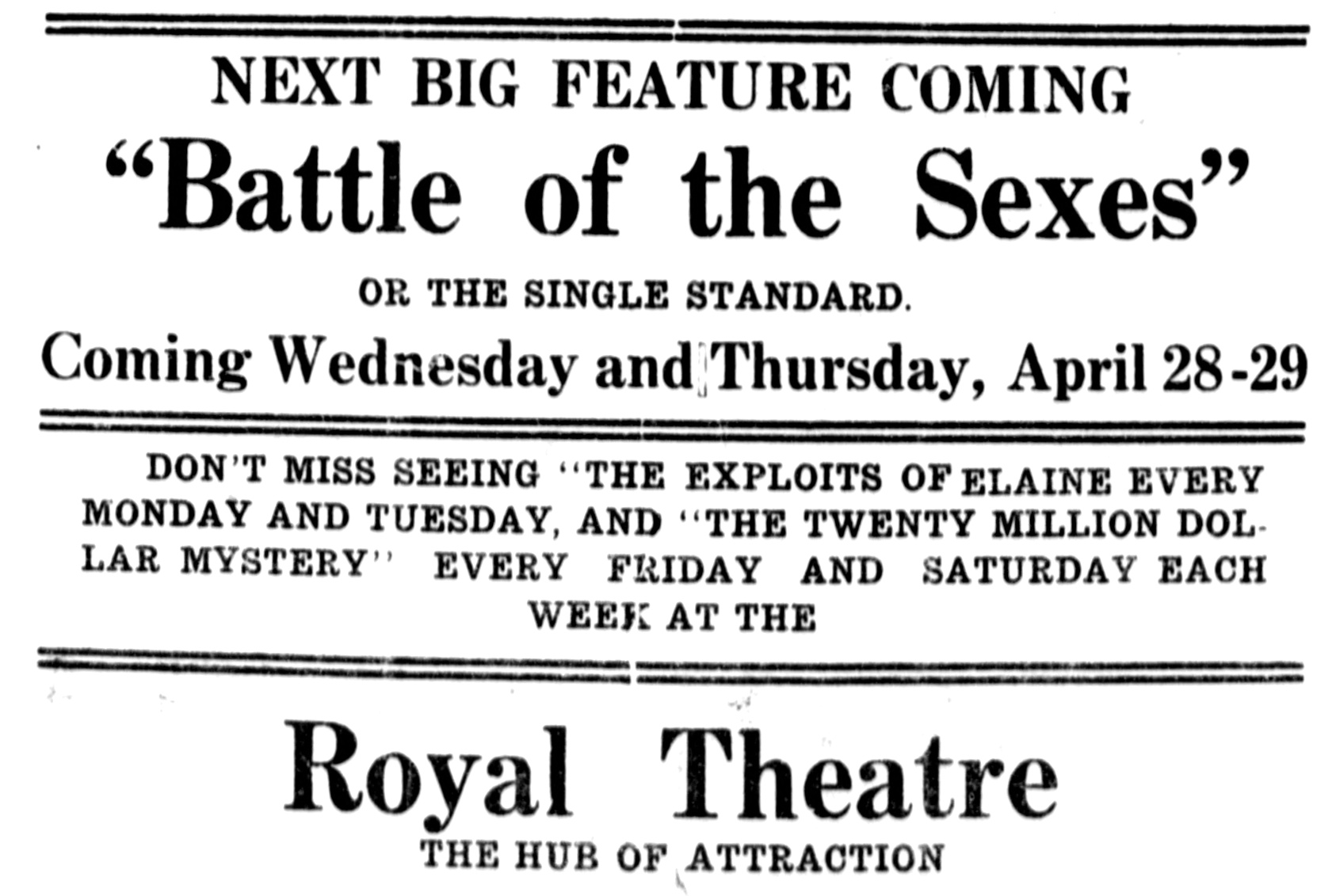
- A newspaper advertisement
- Directed by: D. W. Griffith
- Based on: The Single Standard by Daniel Carson Goodman
- Starring: Donald Crisp; Lillian Gish
- Cinematography: G. W. Bitzer
- Edited by: James Smith; Rose Smith
- Distributed by: Mutual Film Company; Continental Feature Film Corporation
- Release date: April 12, 1914 (U.S.)
- Running time: 50 minutes
- Country: United States
- Language: Silent (English intertitles)

The Battle of the Sexes is a 1914 American silent drama film directed by D. W. Griffith for the Majestic Motion Picture Company. No complete print of the film is known to exist; however, a fragment has survived. Griffith remade the film as The Battle of the Sexes in 1928 as a comedy-drama and this latter version is available on DVD.

== Plot ==
Frank Andrews (Donald Crisp) is a well-to-do, middle-class apartment dweller who is devoted to his wife (Mary Alden) and two children, John (Robert Harron) and Jane (Lillian Gish). Andrews enters into a midlife crisis when a fetching young lady, Cleo (Fay Tincher), moves into the apartment next door to the Andrewses.

Cleo takes note of Andrews' interest in her and begins to flirt with him, going so far as to set a fire in her apartment in order to attract his aid. Before long, Andrews and Cleo are involved in an affair, and Andrews begins to neglect both his family and responsibilities at work.

Jane, humiliated and aghast at her mother's silent suffering over the situation, goes next door with the idea of killing Cleo, but instead they strike up a conversation, and a mutual understanding. They hatch a plan whereby one of Cleo's former beaus (Owen Moore) appears to be courting Jane in front of Andrews, who swiftly condemns his daughter's interest in the man.

Jane counters by pointing out Andrews' own poor moral choices, and he sees the error of his ways. Andrews is happily reconciled to his family, and Cleo sets out in search of new digs.

== Cast ==
- Donald Crisp as Frank Andrews
- Lillian Gish as Jane Andrews, the daughter
- Robert Harron as John Andrews, the son
- Mary Alden as Mrs. Frank Andrews
- Owen Moore as Cleo's lover
- Fay Tincher as Cleo
- W. E. Lawrence

== History and background ==
The Battle of the Sexes was the second D. W. Griffith feature to be released to the public, following Biograph's long-delayed release of Griffith's first feature, Judith of Bethulia, by barely more than a month. He had already begun The Escape (1914), but production had been stopped when actress Blanche Sweet fell sick with scarlet fever, and the Reliance-Majestic Studio was already in trouble and in need of a viable Griffith property, fast. Griffith decided on a scenario entitled "The Single Standard", written by in-house screenwriter Daniel Carson Goodman and filmed at the Reliance studio in New York City, rather than at the Hollywood studio, which was still being built. According to Lillian Gish, The Battle of the Sexes was shot in only five days. Although the film was complete by February, its release was delayed for two further months. Several reasons have been advanced for the impasse, but scholar Paul Spehr has suggested that both Reliance-Majestic and its distributor, Mutual, were having difficulty developing an effective distribution strategy for longer, multi-reel films in a market still dominated by one- and two-reel subjects. The Battle of the Sexes was premiered at Weber's Theater in New York City on April 12, 1914, and was a considerable success, the first Griffith enjoyed with his name over the title.

Although the film is routinely listed as "lost", Iris Barry mentioned the existence of a short fragment of it in her 1940 monograph on Griffith. The surviving scene takes place in a restaurant, where Mrs. Andrews and the children take a booth, and the children note that Mr. Andrews and Cleo are seated at the booth next to them; Mrs. Andrews has not noticed this, and the children find an excuse to get her out of there just before the scene ends. Were there a minute or two more of this fragment extant, it might be possible to see Rudolph Valentino's alleged screen debut in the bit part of a taxi dancer; he is known to have played as an extra in an early Griffith feature, and a shadowy figure tentatively identified in one of the stills for The Battle of the Sexes may be him.

While the familiar, and now popular, 1928 remake of The Battle of the Sexes plays largely as a comedy, the 1914 original was a melodrama.

== See also ==
- List of lost films
