= The Charmer (1917 film) =

1917 film directed by Jack Conway

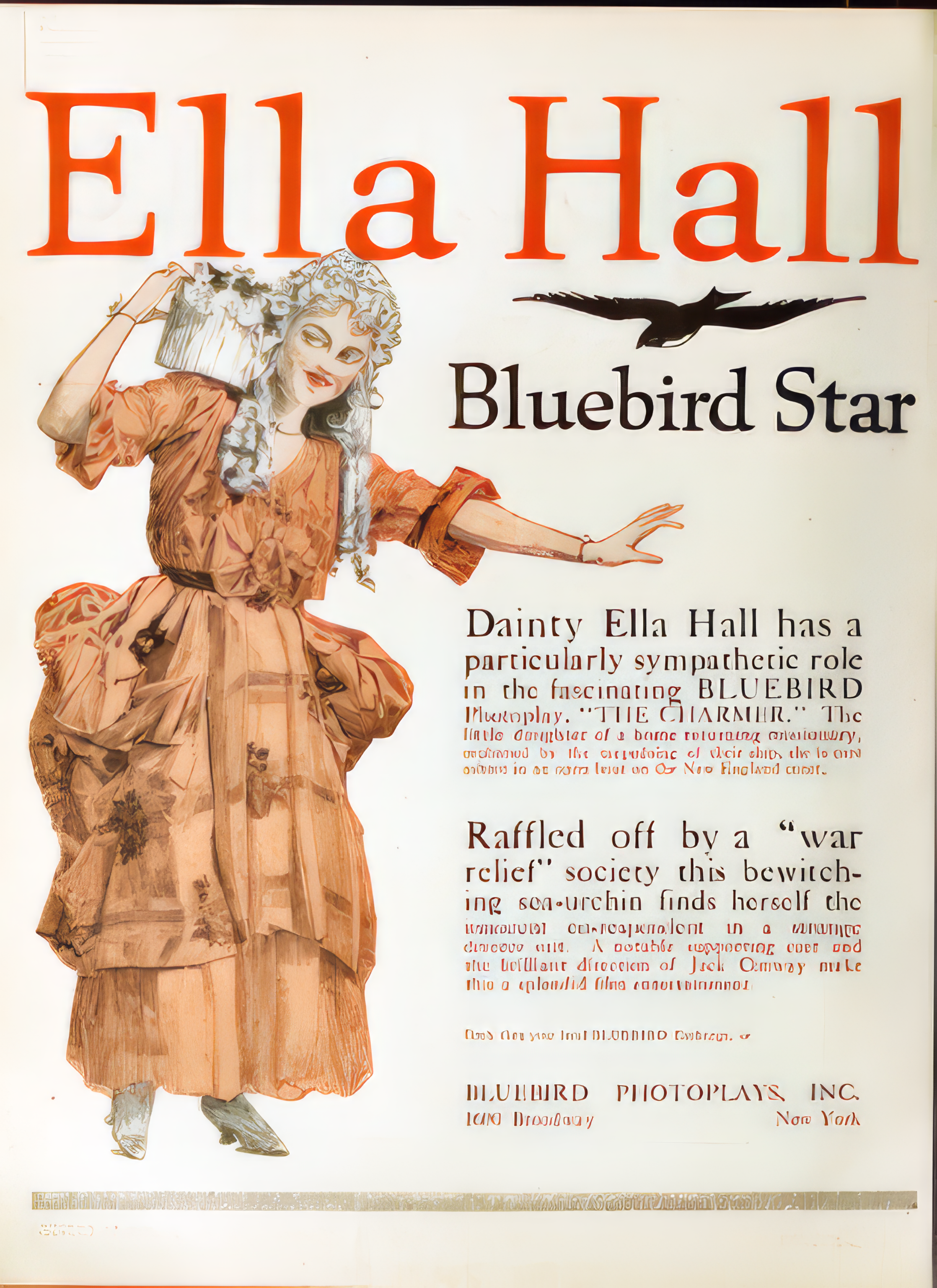
- Directed by: Jack Conway
- Written by: J. Grubb Alexander; Fred Myton
- Starring: Ella Hall; Belle Bennett; Martha Mattox
- Cinematography: Edward A. Kull
- Production company: Universal Pictures
- Distributed by: Universal Pictures
- Release date: August 27, 1917
- Running time: 5 reels
- Country: United States
- Languages: Silent; English intertitles

The Charmer is a 1917 American silent drama film directed by Jack Conway and starring Ella Hall, Belle Bennett and Martha Mattox.

== Plot summary ==
Ambrosia Lee is a kind-hearted and considerate woman who enjoys helping others and offering comfort through her cheerful nature. Her caring personality is challenged when she becomes involved in an effort to save her Aunt Charlotte’s marriage. Through patience and understanding, she helps bring about a positive outcome, as her aunt and uncle eventually reconcile and reunite.

== Cast ==
- Ella Hall as Ambrosia Lee
- Belle Bennett as Charlotte Whitney
- Martha Mattox as Cynthia M. Perkins
- James McCandlas as Don Whitney
- George Webb as Franklin Whitney
- Frank MacQuarrie as Judge Applebee
- A.E. Witting as Parker
- Lincoln Stedman as Jed

== Bibliography ==
- James Robert Parish & Michael R. Pitts. Film directors: a guide to their American films. Scarecrow Press, 1974.
