= Through the Sluice Gates =

1913 film

- Directed by: John G. Adolfi
- Starring: William Garwood; Belle Bennett
- Distributed by: Mutual Film
- Release date: October 19, 1913
- Country: United States
- Languages: Silent film English intertitles

Through the Sluice Gates is a 1913 American silent short drama film directed by John G. Adolfi starring William Garwood and Belle Bennett. It showed images of the then-unfinished Los Angeles aqueduct.

== Plot ==
This plot synopsis was published in The Moving Picture World for October 25, 1913.

John Browning, a young farmer, left his home because he could not stand the petty persecutions of his stepfather and his son, who were alike in their grasping and unfeeling characteristics. Some months after he had moved to the city he received word that his mother had died, and when he returned home he found that everything had been left to the stepfather. John had good reasons to suspect trickery and openly charged his stepfather with it, but could prove nothing.

The villagers all agreed that there was bad blood between young Browning and his stepfather, and predicted there might be serious effects, but when John was arrested and charged with the murder of Gray, his stepfather, it was considerably more than they had bargained for. Gray had been found dead in his home, while John had stood nearby with a rifle in his hands. He was placed in prison to wait trial.

The circumstantial evidence seemed so conclusive that Mary, John's sweetheart, persuaded him to escape. John and the girl mounted horses which had been in waiting and rode away. The escape was discovered almost immediately and a posse, which included the brother, was organized and started in pursuit. The fugitives soon found that they were being overhauled and capture would have been certain if the girl's quick wit had not thought of a way to liberty. She guided Browning to a nearby culvert, and he descended into the tunnel, making his way to the sluice gates a mile away. The pursuers seeking the girl ride away alone, were at first baffled, then realized the trick and rode at full speed towards the hills. But before they reached their goal the girl had opened the sluice gates and released her sweetheart. They were well on the road to safety when the posse arrived. Half mad with hatred and disappointment, George Gray, the stepbrother, leaped over the cliff and leveled his revolver at the fugitive. But before he could fire, his foot slipped and his body hurled to the road a hundred feet below. Browning hastened to his assistance, but Gray had received mortal injuries. Before he died he confessed that he had accidentally caused his father's death and had decided to let John bear the responsibility. John's right to his mother's property was also admitted by the dying man, and cleared in the eyes of the law, Browning returned to his home to prepare it for the coming of his bride.
