= Mathilde Comont =

French actress

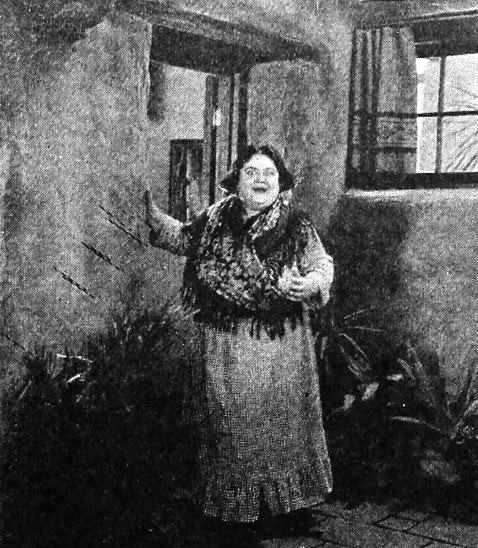
- Comont in The Enchanted Hill (1926)
- Born: 9 September 1886; Bordeaux, France
- Died: 21 June 1938 (aged 51); Hollywood, California, U.S.
- Occupation: Actress
- Years active: 1908–1937

Mathilde Comont (9 September 1886 – 21 June 1938), credited also as Mathilda Caumont, was a French-born American actress, primarily of the silent era.

== Biography ==
Comont was born in Bordeaux, she appeared in films in her native country, particularly shorts, from 1908 and 1910, and then she appeared in U.S. films, starting with a few film shorts in 1917 and features including more than 60 films between 1919 and 1937, primarily as a supporting player, with several uncredited smaller roles. A heavy and short woman of 5 feet, 4 inches (163 cm), she died aged 51 from a heart attack in Hollywood, California in 1938.

== Partial filmography ==
- Max Wants a Divorce (1917) - Loony Diva
- A Rogue's Romance (1919)
- A Tale of Two Worlds (1921) - Shopper (uncredited)
- Rosita (1923) - Rosita's mother
- The Thief of Bagdad (1924) - the corpulent Prince of Persia (uncredited)
- Mademoiselle Midnight (1924) - Dueña / Mme. Nellie
- His Hour (1924) - Fat Harem Lady
- Playing with Souls (1925) - Brothel Worker (uncredited)
- If Marriage Fails (1925) - Lisa
- The Sea Beast (1926) - Mula
- The Enchanted Hill (1926) - Conchita
- The Girl from Montmartre (1926) - Carmenata
- The Far Cry (1926) - Maid
- La Bohème (1926) - Madame Benoit
- The Gilded Highway (1926) - Sarah
- Kiki (1926) - Maid (uncredited)
- Paris at Midnight (1926) - Madame Vauquer
- Volcano! (1926) - Madame Timbuctoo
- Puppets (1926) - Rosa
- The Passionate Quest (1926) - (uncredited)
- What Price Glory? (1926) - Camille
- Rose of the Tenements (1926) - Mrs. Kohn
- The Whole Town's Talking (1926) - Maid (scenes deleted)
- The Wrong Mr. Wright (1927)
- The Loves of Carmen (1927) - Emilia
- Love (1927) - Marfa - Hostess at Inn (uncredited)
- Streets of Shanghai (1927) - Buttercup, Mary's Companion
- A Woman's Way (1928) - Mother Suzy
- Ramona (1928) - Marda
- The Charge of the Gauchos (1928) - Aunt Rosita
- You Know What Sailors Are (1928) - The British Captain
- The Rush Hour (1928) - Chanteuse at Bohemia Cafe (uncredited)
- The Sea Bat (1930) - Mimba
- Call of the Flesh (1930, and French language version Le chanteur de Séville) - La Rumbarita
- Romance (1930) - Vannucci
- Just Like Heaven (1930) - Madame Fogharde
- The Lash (1930) - Concha (uncredited)
- Along Came Youth (1930) - Bit Role (uncredited)
- The Lady Who Dared (1931) - Chambermaid (uncredited)
- The Hard Hombre (1931) - Maria Romero
- The Cuban Love Song (1931) - Aunt Rose
- Freaks (1932) - Madame Bartet (uncredited)
- Lady with a Past (1932) - Waitress (uncredited)
- Careless Lady (1932) - French Hotel Maid (uncredited)
- L'athlète incomplet (1932) - Eulalie
- Laughing at Life (1933) - Mamacita
- The Devil's in Love (1933) - Nana (uncredited)
- Design for Living (1933) - Heavy Woman (uncredited)
- Caravan (1934) - Gypsy (uncredited)
- All Men Are Enemies (1934) - Mamina
- A Wicked Woman (1934) - Proprietess (uncredited)
- Escapade (1935) - Carmen
- Here's to Romance (1935) - Viola
- Waterfront Lady (1935) - Mrs. Spadaloni
- Ceiling Zero (1936) - Mama Gini (uncredited)
- Robin Hood of El Dorado (1936) - Señora Matinez (uncredited)
- Poor Little Rich Girl (1936) - Tony's Wife
- Anthony Adverse (1936) - Mama Guisseppi
- The Longest Night (1936) - Fat Scrubwoman (uncredited)
- Along Came Love (1936) - Customer
- God's Country and the Woman (1937) - Mary, Jo's Housekeeper (uncredited)
- Wise Girl (1937) - Mama Guido (uncredited)
