= Gerald Cranston's Lady =

1924 film

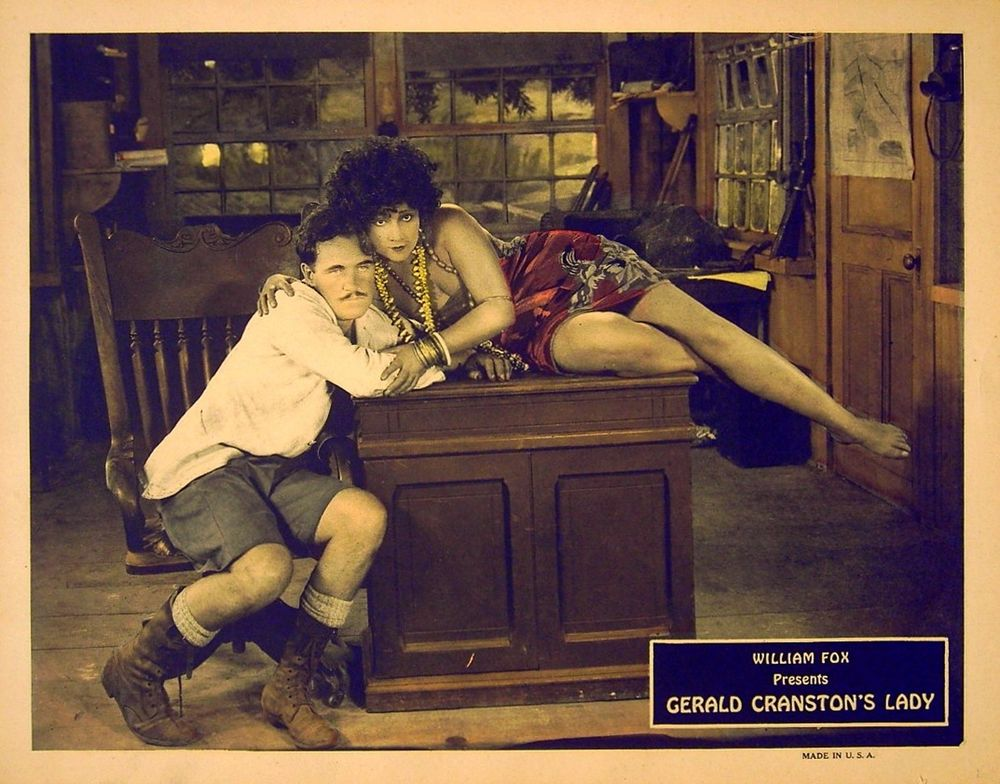
- Lobby card
- Directed by: Emmett J. Flynn
- Written by: Edmund Goulding
- Based on: Gerald Cranston's Lady by Gilbert Frankau
- Produced by: William Fox
- Starring: James Kirkwood; Alma Rubens; Walter McGrail
- Production company: Fox Film Corporation
- Distributed by: Fox Film Corporation
- Release date: October 19, 1924
- Running time: 70 minutes
- Country: United States
- Language: Silent (English intertitles)

Gerald Cranston's Lady is a 1924 American silent drama film directed by Emmett J. Flynn and starring James Kirkwood, Alma Rubens, and Walter McGrail. It is based on the novel of the same title by Gilbert Frankau published the same year as the film was released.

== Plot ==
As described in a review in a film magazine, wealthy Englishman Gerald Cranston makes a bargain with Lady Hermione to marry her. Love is not to enter into the affair as he is marrying for social prestige and she to secure financial independence for herself and young son. Gordon Ibbotsleigh, who loves Hermione, goes on a venture to Africa which unknown to him Gerald finances. Before going, Gordon taunts Hermione with being a purchased woman and endeavors to have sex with her. Hermione respects Gerald and is jealous of the way her little son loves him. So she goes to the country. Angela, her cousin who loves Gerald, has sex with him and uses all her powers to win him, even following him to Paris in an airplane. Hermione returns, realizing she has begun to love Gerald, but this is turned to disgust when she learns of his trip to Paris. She taunts him with it. Just then, a discontented mob from Gerald’s factories attacks him and he is badly beaten. Angela comes to Hermione and tells her that Gerald is true to her. When he is brought in the house helpless, Hermione, who has repulsed all of Gerald’s previous advances, tells him she loves him. She offers the entire fortune he has settled on her and the child in order to save him from threatened financial ruin.

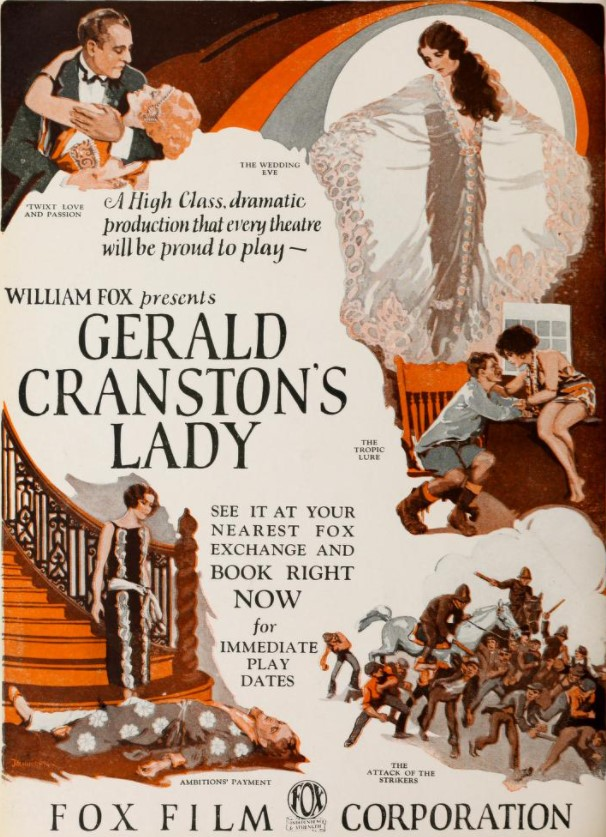
Trade advertisement

== Cast ==
- James Kirkwood as Gerald Cranston
- Alma Rubens as Hermione, Lady Gerald Cranston
- Walter McGrail as Gordon Ibbotsleigh
- J. Farrell MacDonald as Rennie
- Lucien Littlefield as Stanley Tilotson
- Spottiswoode Aitken as Ephraim Brewster
- Templar Saxe as Lord Rawley
- Richard Headrick as Arthur
- Marguerite De La Motte as Angela
- Eric Mayne as Sir James Guthrie
- Lydia Knott as Cranston's Mother
- Valentina Zimina as The African lady (uncredited)

== Production ==
Gerald Cranston's Lady was filmed in London, England, by Fox Film. Although adopted from a novel in which a sexual theme was paramount, the film's plot was modified so that love and not passion was the dominating motivation in all situations except for a suspicion of infidelity during the Paris trip, which is afterwards proved to be groundless.

== Preservation ==
With no prints of Gerald Cranston's Lady located in any film archives, it is a lost film.

== Bibliography ==
- Kennedy, Matthew (2004). Edmund Goulding's Dark Victory: Hollywood's Genius Bad Boy. University of Wisconsin Press. ISBN 0-299-19770-0
- Solomon, Aubrey (2011). The Fox Film Corporation, 1915-1935: A History and Filmography. McFarland. ISBN 978-0-7864-6286-5
