= Wife or Country =

1918 film

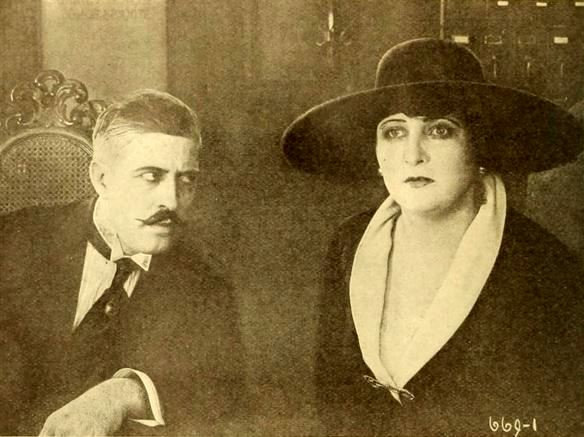
- Film still
- Directed by: E. Mason Hopper
- Written by: Harry Mestayer; Charles J. Wilson
- Starring: Gloria Swanson
- Cinematography: Clyde Cook
- Distributed by: Triangle Film Corporation
- Release date: December 29, 1918
- Running time: 5 reels
- Country: United States
- Language: Silent (English intertitles)

Wife or Country is a 1918 American silent drama film directed by E. Mason Hopper and starring Gloria Swanson in her last role for Triangle Film Corporation. It is not known whether the film currently survives.

== Plot ==
Based upon a review in a film magazine, Gretchen (Lederer) has reclaimed husband Dale Barker (Mestayer) from a drinking habit, and he has become a lawyer working with the Department of Justice in hunting down German propagandists. Before their marriage, Gretchen had been involved with propagandists and cannot now extricate herself, and she fears discovery by her husband. She is jealous of Sylvia Hamilton (Swanson), Dale's stenographer, and plans on bringing her under suspicion. When arrested as a spy, Sylvia turns over a mass of evidence, some of which incriminates Gretchen, placing Dale between love of country and loyalty to his wife.

== Cast ==
- Harry Mestayer as Dale Barker
- Gretchen Lederer as Gretchen Barker
- Gloria Swanson as Sylvia Hamilton
- Jack Richardson as Dr. Meyer Stahl
- Charles West as Jack Holiday
