= If Marriage Fails =

1925 film by John Ince

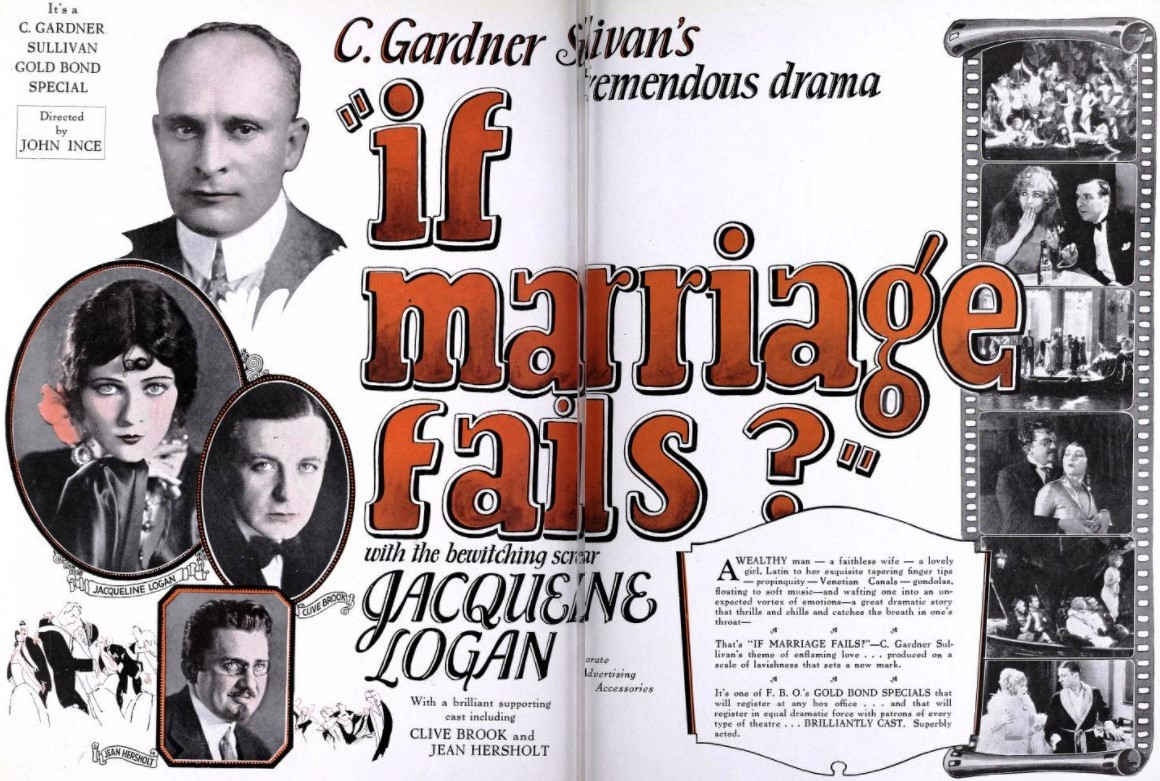
- Advertisement
- Directed by: John Ince
- Written by: C. Gardner Sullivan
- Starring: Jacqueline Logan; Belle Bennett; Clive Brook; Jean Hersholt
- Cinematography: James Diamond
- Production company: C. Gardner Sullivan Productions
- Distributed by: Film Booking Offices of America
- Release date: June 1, 1925
- Running time: 70 minutes
- Country: United States
- Language: Silent (English intertitles)

If Marriage Fails is a 1925 American silent drama film directed by John Ince and written by C. Gardner Sullivan.

== Plot ==
As described in a film magazine review, Eleanor prefers the company of the unpopular Gene Deering to that of her wealthy husband, Joe Woodbury, who has fallen in love with the fortune teller Nadia. Becoming jealous, Eleanor tells Nadia that she is about to become a mother, and Nadia promises that she will not see Joe again. Eleanor and Deering are picked up following a roadhouse raid by Nadia and Dr. Mallini, who attends Eleanor when she is slightly injured. The doctor tells Nadia that Eleanor has lied about any approaching motherhood. Joe learns of the roadhouse affair, divorces Eleanor, and wins Nadia as a wife.

== Cast ==
- Jacqueline Logan as Nadia
- Belle Bennett as Eleanor Woodbury
- Clive Brook as Joe Woodbury
- Jean Hersholt as Dr. Mallini
- Donald MacDonald as Gene Deering
- Mathilde Comont as Lisa
- Cissy Fitzgerald as Mrs. Loring

== Preservation ==
With no prints of If Marriage Fails located in any film archives, it is a lost film.
