= Gerald Cranston's Lady (novel) =

1924 novel

- Author: Gilbert Frankau
- Language: English
- Genre: Romance, Melodrama
- Publication date: 1924
- Publication place: United Kingdom
- Media type: Print

Gerald Cranston's Lady is a melodramatic novel by the British writer Gilbert Frankau which was first published in 1924. It portrays the marriage of an ambitious financier to a well-connected woman in an attempt to boost his social standing. The result is a loveless marriage in which both develop an interest in other people, until eventually being reconciled.

== Adaptation ==
The same year of the novel's release, it was adapted into an American silent film Gerald Cranston's Lady by Fox Film. It retained the English setting of the original story.

== Bibliography ==
- Solomon, Aubrey. The Fox Film Corporation, 1915-1935: A History and Filmography. McFarland, 2011.
