= La Bohème (1926 film) =

1926 American silent drama film

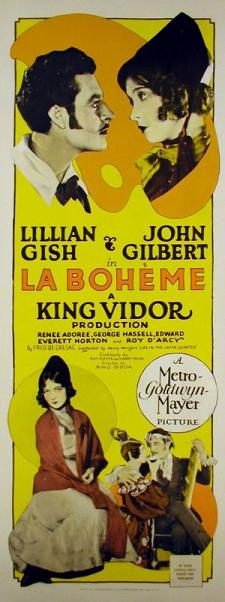
- Promotional poster
- Directed by: King Vidor
- Written by: Fred de Gresac (screenplay); Harry Behn; Ray Doyle (continuity); William M. Conselman; Ruth Cummings (titles)
- Based on: La bohème (1896) opera by Giacomo Puccini
- Produced by: Irving Thalberg
- Starring: Lillian Gish; John Gilbert
- Cinematography: Hendrik Sartov
- Edited by: Hugh Wynn
- Music by: William Axt (uncredited); David Mendoza (uncredited)
- Distributed by: Metro-Goldwyn-Mayer
- Release date: February 24, 1926
- Running time: 95 minutes
- Country: United States
- Language: Silent (English intertitles)

La Bohème is a 1926 American silent drama film directed by King Vidor, based on the 1896 opera La bohème by Giacomo Puccini. Lillian Gish and John Gilbert star in a tragic romance in which a tubercular seamstress sacrifices her life so that her lover, a bohemian playwright, might pen his masterpiece. Gish, at the height of her influence with Metro-Goldwyn-Mayer studios, asserted significant control over the production, determining the story, director, cast, cinematography, and costume design. In February 2020, the film was shown at the 70th Berlin International Film Festival, as part of a retrospective dedicated to King Vidor's career.

== Plot ==
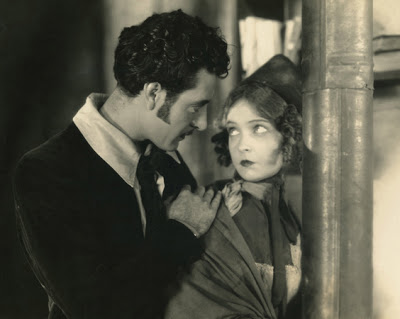
Lillian Gish and John Gilbert in La Bohème

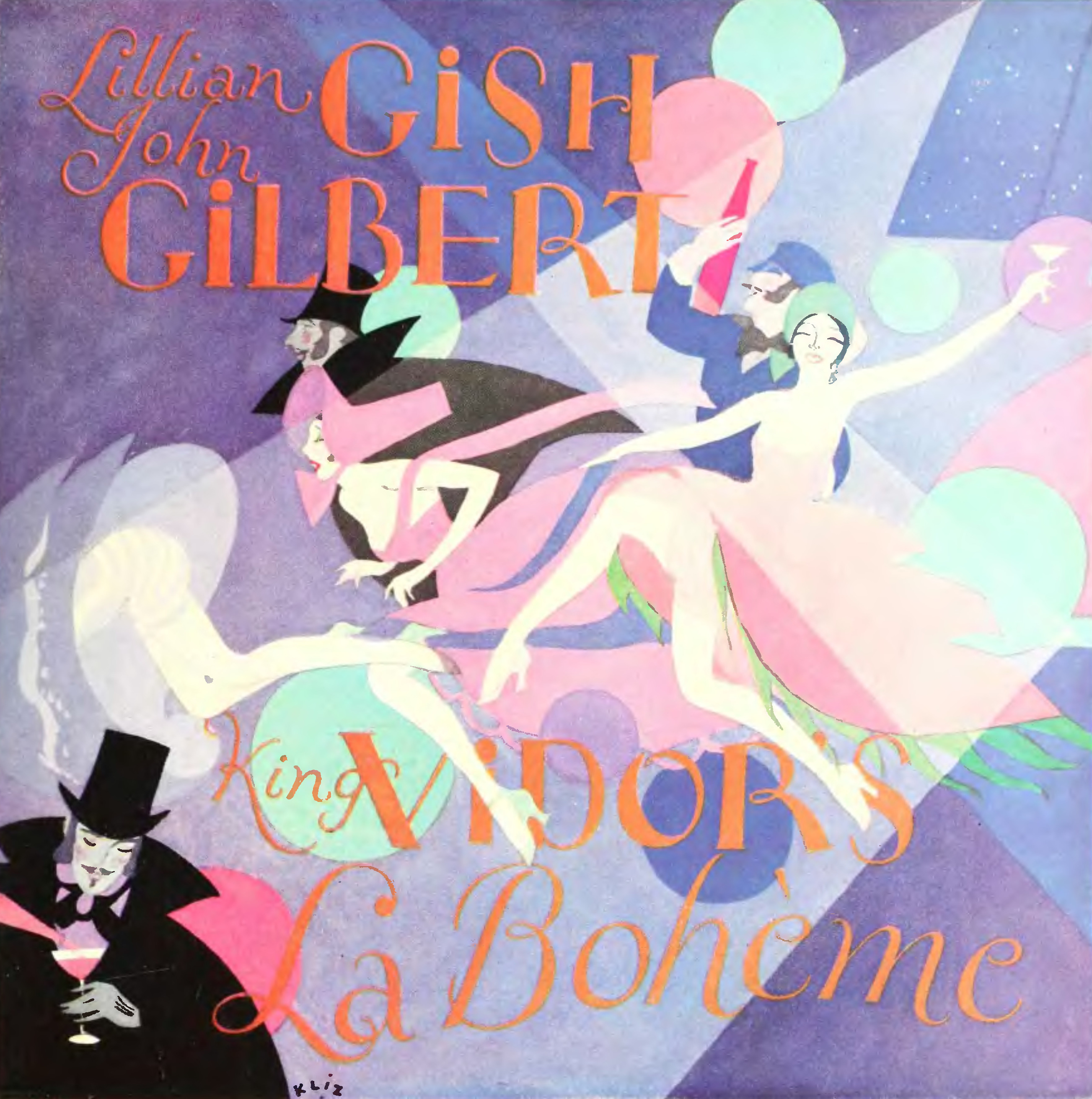
La Bohème advertisement in Motion Picture News, 1926

Several struggling bohemians try to survive in the Latin Quarter of Paris in the winter of 1830, hoping to one day become famous. Playwright Rodolphe and his painter roommate Marcel have trouble with Bernard, the landlord, who threatens to throw them out if they do not come up with the monthly rent that night. Rodolphe reluctantly starts writing an overdue article for a journal editor to earn some money, but the editor rejects his work. With the help of their friends, musician Schaunard and bookish Colline, they are able to raise the money.

Their next door neighbor, Mimi, an orphaned, friendless embroiderer, has the same problem. Bernard is attracted to her, but when she does not respond to his overture, he issues the same threat. She takes her meager belongings to the municipal pawnshop, but does not receive enough money to pay the rent. On her way back, she is nearly run over (deliberately) by the carriage of the rich, idle aristocrat Vicomte Paul. She has to fend off his advances.

When Marcel is invited to dinner by his girlfriend and downstairs neighbor, Musette, he persuades her to allow Schaunard to join them. Then the musician gets her to include Colline, who asks for Rodolphe. Rodolphe misses his cue to join the festivities in order to become acquainted with Mimi. Seeing how cold she is, he invites her to warm herself in his apartment. Later, after she vacates her room, Rodolphe entices her to share in the food Musette has provided. Then Vicomte Paul comes over. She thinks he wants some embroidery done, not realizing he has baser motives. Rodolphe does and immediately becomes jealous of the aristocrat. In any case, Mimi is able to pay her rent and stay.

In spring, Mimi joins her friends out in the country for her very first picnic. She and the love-smitten Rodolphe wander away. After a while, she admits that she loves him. This inspires Rodolphe to write a play. When Mimi takes his latest, long overdue article to his editor, she is requested to tell him that he is discharged. Wanting Rodolphe to continue working undisturbed on his play, she works secretly at night to keep up the deception that he still has a paying job. The strain, however, makes her sick.

When Vicomte Paul comes to pick up Mimi's handiwork, she tells him of Rodolphe's new play. Still hoping to seduce her, he offers to show it to a theatrical manager, if she will come with him to the theatre. Rodolphe sees them together and, in a rage, accuses Mimi of having an affair. She tries to explain, but he refuses to listen.

Rodolphe tries to forget Mimi. When he runs into the editor, he is surprised to hear he was fired five weeks ago. Meanwhile, Mimi, with Musette's help, dresses up and goes with Vicomte Paul to the theatre, hoping to get Rodolphe's play accepted. She once again rejects the vicomte's advances. Returning home, she is confronted by Rodolphe. She admits having worked in secret for him. He initially forgives her, until he finds out that she went out with Vicomte Paul and jumps to the conclusion she got the money from him. He hits her, but soon apologizes when he discovers she is very sick.

Rodolphe goes to find a doctor, but she leaves before they return, explaining in a letter that she will come back when his play is a success. He searches for her for months. Out of his anguish, a new and greater play is born. This turns out to be a hit, but he is miserable without Mimi. Meanwhile, Mimi is toiling in the slums of Paris, but the hard work is too much for the frail woman. She collapses. The doctor tells her coworkers she will not live out the night. She stumbles out into the street and eventually reaches her old apartment. Rodolphe is ecstatic to see her. Their friends, however, realize her condition. While he goes to fetch her pet bird, she tells Musette she is happy, before dying.

== Cast ==
- Lillian Gish as Mimi Brodeuse
- John Gilbert as Rodolphe
- Renée Adorée as Musette
- George Hassell as Schaunard
- Roy D'Arcy as Vicomte Paul
- Edward Everett Horton as Colline
- Karl Dane as Benoit (Janitor)
- Mathilde Comont as Madame Benoit
- Gino Corrado as Marcel
- Eugene Pouyet as Bernard (as Gene Pouyet)
- Frank Currier as Theatre Manager
- David Mir as Alexis
- Catherine Vidor as Louise
- Valentina Zimina as Phemie
- Harry Crocker in a bit part (uncredited)
- Blanche Payson (uncredited)

== Production ==
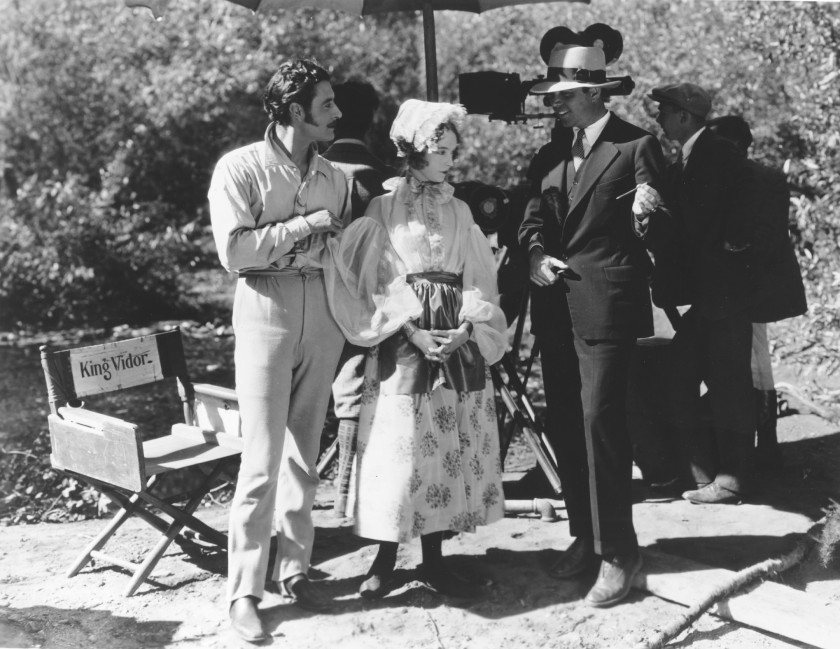
Rehearsing on the set of La Bohème: L to R: John Gilbert, Lillian Gish, King Vidor (director)

Metro-Goldwyn-Mayer producer Irving Thalberg matched the two biggest stars on the studio roster for the adaption of La bohème: John Gilbert, fresh from his triumphant success in The Big Parade (1925), with one of the greatest actresses in Hollywood, Lillian Gish, a veteran of legendary film director D. W. Griffith’s stock company.

The highly sought after Gish, who extracted an $800,000 salary from Thalberg for two pictures, was M-G-M’s highest paid actor and could dictate her terms. As such, her contract "stipulated for her input into stories, directors, and cast, although the studio kept the final decision".

Gish, who possessed creative and practical expertise in all aspects of film-making, selected an adaption of Italian composer Giacomo Puccini's 1896 opera La bohème for her debut film with the studio. Viewing two-reels of the as yet unreleased The Big Parade and accompanied by producer Thalberg, she was impressed and approved her pairing with Gilbert and much of the film’s supporting cast, as well enlisting director King Vidor.

Vidor, a great admirer of D.W. Griffith, acquiesced when Gish insisted on full rehearsals in the "Master’s style" for each scene, but she abandoned the practice when cast and crew registered objections. Another Gish idea had genuine promise: she and Gilbert would refrain from any physical contact between their characters Mimi and lover Rodolphe so as to create a powerful sense of anticipation in the audience: only in the ultimate scene would they be rewarded with a lover's carnal embrace. Though Vidor shot the sequences using Gish's innovation, they were emphatically rejected by the studio when preview audiences clamored for frequent and ardent contact between the stars. When the cast was scheduled for a more conventional re-shooting, Gish is reported to have remarked, "Oh dear, I've got to go through another day of kissing John Gilbert."

Gish benefited from the distinctive soft-focus lighting technique developed expressly for her by Orphans of the Storm cinematographer Hendrik Sartov, and termed the "Lillian Gish". (M-G-M's Mae Murray, a top ranking star, employed the talented cinematographer Oliver Marsh to handle her closeups with use of the "baby spot" lighting that erased signs of aging.) Gilbert's appearance was not enhanced by these "glamorized, heavily gauzed" effects and his performance suffered for it.

The famous costume designer Erté, favored by the studio, failed to meet Gish's requirement that Mimi's clothing fully reflect her impoverished condition. Gish demanded "old and worn" – albeit silk – dresses.

Gish's preparation for Mimi's death scene involved visits to sanatoriums to observe victims of terminal consumption, the disease to which Mimi succumbs. Three days in advance of the shooting, Gish stopped drinking fluids of any kind which helped her to physiologically produce "a sense of sickness". Gish effectively conveyed the exhaustion and isolation of Mimi's dying struggle to return to her lover Rodolphe through the streets of Paris. Vidor and his crew were "disturbed" and "traumatized" by her performance. Gish's "rich, moving characterization" had the effect of trivializing the joie de vivre preoccupations that Gilbert and his bohemian companions portrayed.

Neither Vidor nor Gilbert favored Gish's interpretation of Mimi's character in the production. In an interview with Theatre Arts Magazine, Gilbert expressed his reservations about his famous co-star:

Mimi is supposed to be a creature whose very body and soul crave for Rudolph, a woman who loves with a passion that absorbs every fiber of her being. And what is unbeautiful about such a grand, vital love? No, instead, we had to make her a pale, passive, prim phantom.

Lillian Gish had returned from a visit to Europe and wanted especially to reach out to her European fans. Making a film which takes place in Paris seemed be a good way to do this. When she first arrived at the studio for filming, Gish was treated as "a queen". Co-stars said she was acting very arrogant, with Marion Davies saying that Gish brushed off Gilbert and did not want to give director King Vidor a hand.

According to Robert Osborne, host of Turner Classic Movies, Gish prepared for the death scene by not drinking or eating for three days. When Vidor saw her condition, he worried that it might be Gish's death scene as well as Mimi's. She also learned how to breathe without visible movement and visited hospitals to learn about stages of tuberculosis.

Shooting lasted from August 19 to November 5, 1925. A previous version of the story had been filmed in 1916 with Alice Brady in a production financed by her father William A. Brady for his World Pictures.

== Reception ==
The film made a profit of $377,000.

== See also ==
- Lillian Gish filmography

== Footnotes ==
=== Sources ===
- Baxter, John. 1970. Hollywood in the Thirties. International Film Guide Series. Paperback Library, New York. LOC Card Number 68–24003.
- Baxter, John. 1976. King Vidor. Simon & Schuster, Inc. Monarch Film Studies. LOC Card Number 75–23544.
- Brownlow, Kevin and Kobal, John. 1979. Hollywood: The Pioneers. Alfred A. Knopf Inc. A Borzoi Book, New York. ISBN 0-394-50851-3
- Durgnat, Raymond and Simmon, Scott. 1988. King Vidor, American. University of California Press, Berkeley. ISBN 0-520-05798-8
- Landazuri, Roberto. 2009. Bardelys the Magnificent. San Francisco Silent Film Festival (SFSFF) https://silentfilm.org/bardelys-the-magnificent/ Retrieved 28 May 2020.
- Landazuri, Margarita. 2011. La Bohème. San Francisco Silent Film Festival (SFSFF), Winter 2011. https://silentfilm.org/la-boheme/ Retrieved 28 May 2020
