= The Scarlet Lady (1928 film) =

1928 film

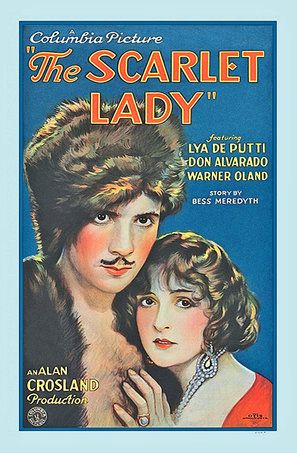
- Directed by: Alan Crosland
- Written by: Bess Meredyth (story and scenario); Elmer Harris
- Produced by: Harry Cohn
- Starring: Lya de Putti; Don Alvarado
- Cinematography: James Van Trees
- Edited by: Frank Atkinson
- Distributed by: Columbia Pictures
- Release date: August 1, 1928
- Running time: 72 minutes
- Country: United States
- Languages: Sound (Synchronized); English Intertitles

The Scarlet Lady is a 1928 American synchronized sound drama film written by Bess Meredyth and directed by Alan Crosland. While the film has no audible dialog, it was released with a synchronized musical score with sound effects using the sound-on-film Western Electric Sound System process. It was produced and distributed by Columbia Pictures. This film is important historically as it was the first sound feature released by Columbia Pictures.

== Plot ==
The Scarlet Lady (1928)

In the shadowy basements of Petrograd, amid flickering candlelight and whispered fervor, a revolutionary cell gathers. Among them was Lya, a fiery, flirtatious peasant girl whose devotion to the cause is thinly veiled beneath her true passions: beauty, power, and fine things. She is the sweetheart of Zaneriff, a hardened revolutionary and one of the Red movement's most zealous leaders. But while Zaneriff rants of liberty and overthrowing the Czarist regime, Lya's gaze drifts toward jewels, silks—and her own advantage.

Their clandestine meeting is abruptly shattered when a Cossack patrol, led by the iron-jawed Captain, storms the hideout. Gunfire and confusion follow. Lya narrowly escapes out a window, fleeing blindly into the night—until she stumbles, by fate or chance, onto the snow-dusted estate of Prince Nicholas Korloff, a nobleman recently recalled from the front to fulfill his duty to the Crown through a diplomatic marriage.

When the Captain arrives to inform Nicholas that a fugitive revolutionist is hiding nearby, the Prince, with easy aristocratic dismissal, laughs off the suggestion. That is, until he returns to his chambers and finds Lya—drenched, disheveled, and defiant—hiding under his bed. Amused by the wild-eyed girl who begs for his protection from a Siberian death, Nicholas agrees to shield her—for now.

Days pass. The rebel girl, awed by the opulence of the palace and charmed by the Prince, stays on. She appoints herself an unofficial mistress of the house, directing servants and injecting her bold personality into the rigid corridors of nobility. Nicholas, captivated despite himself, allows her impertinence—until her impulsive tongue insults his royal fiancée. Infuriated, he orders Lya to leave.

But Lya, torn between rebellion and romantic yearning, refuses to go. Just as she clings to hope that Nicholas may relent, Zaneriff infiltrates the palace to retrieve her. He urges Lya to return to the cause, but she hesitates. Before she can choose, the Cossacks return to search the estate. Lya hides once more in Nicholas's chambers—again under the bed.

This time, however, the Prince is no longer amused. He realizes, with quiet intensity, that he has fallen in love with the passionate girl who has upended his life.

For a time, their union blooms, unburdened by politics or position. But their happiness is short-lived. The Prince's ever-watchful valet, driven by duty and perhaps jealousy, reveals Lya's revolutionary ties—and worse, that she came to Nicholas straight from Zaneriff's arms. Nicholas, stung by betrayal, turns on her. Lya responds with proud rage, wishing aloud for the fall of the aristocracy and vowing vengeance if he ever falls into her hands.

Her words become prophecy. The revolution erupts into full force. Zaneriff and his Red Guard overrun the palace. Now fully committed to the cause—and consumed by heartbreak—Lya becomes the infamous “Scarlet Lady”, the most feared figure among the Reds. She declares that her mission is not complete until Prince Nicholas himself is brought before her in chains.

Meanwhile, Nicholas uses his last bribes to send his noble bride to safety and returns to his palace in disguise. Lya finds him there—disheveled, humbled, reduced to a servant's role. She mocks him cruelly, assigning him humiliating tasks. Yet her cruelty is a mask for pain; she still loves him. Her torment becomes unbearable, and she confesses her regret.

But Zaneriff is watching. He learns that Lya has been protecting the Prince and orders her to deliver Nicholas to the firing squad. She pretends to obey, planning instead an escape. Yet before they can flee, Nicholas is seized and thrown into the “cellar of horrors”, where the last of the Royalists await execution beside open graves they themselves have dug.

Zaneriff, gloating, prepares to take the final shot. He saves Nicholas for last, a final trophy in the collapse of the aristocracy.

In one final, desperate gambit, Zaneriff turns to Lya and mockingly asks if she has any last words for the condemned Prince. Her answer is chilling but calm: “Yes… if you’ll be so kind as to hand me your revolver, I’ll deliver my reply in lead.”

Amused, Zaneriff hands over the gun, taunting her to do it. But Lya does not aim at Nicholas—she turns the weapon on Zaneriff, shooting him point blank. He collapses, dying, into the very grave Nicholas was forced to dig.

In the confusion, Lya throws Zaneriff's cloak and cap over Nicholas, and the two lovers flee the palace as the Red Guard reels from the death of their leader.

== Cast ==
- Lya De Putti as Lya
- Don Alvarado as Prince Nicholas
- Warner Oland as Zaneriff
- Otto Matieson as The Valet
- Hans Joby as Captain
- Valentina Zimina as Revolutionary

== Music ==
The film featured a theme song entitled "My Heart Belongs To You" which was composed by Lou Herscher.

== Preservation ==
A print is held at Cineteca Nazionale, Rome. It was previously thought to be lost.

The film was released as part of Columbia Classics Volume 5 on Ultra HD Blu-ray/Blu-ray Disc on October 22, 2024, by Sony Pictures Home Entertainment as a bonus film.

== See also ==
- List of early sound feature films (1926–1929)
