= Haunting Shadows =

1919 film by Henry King

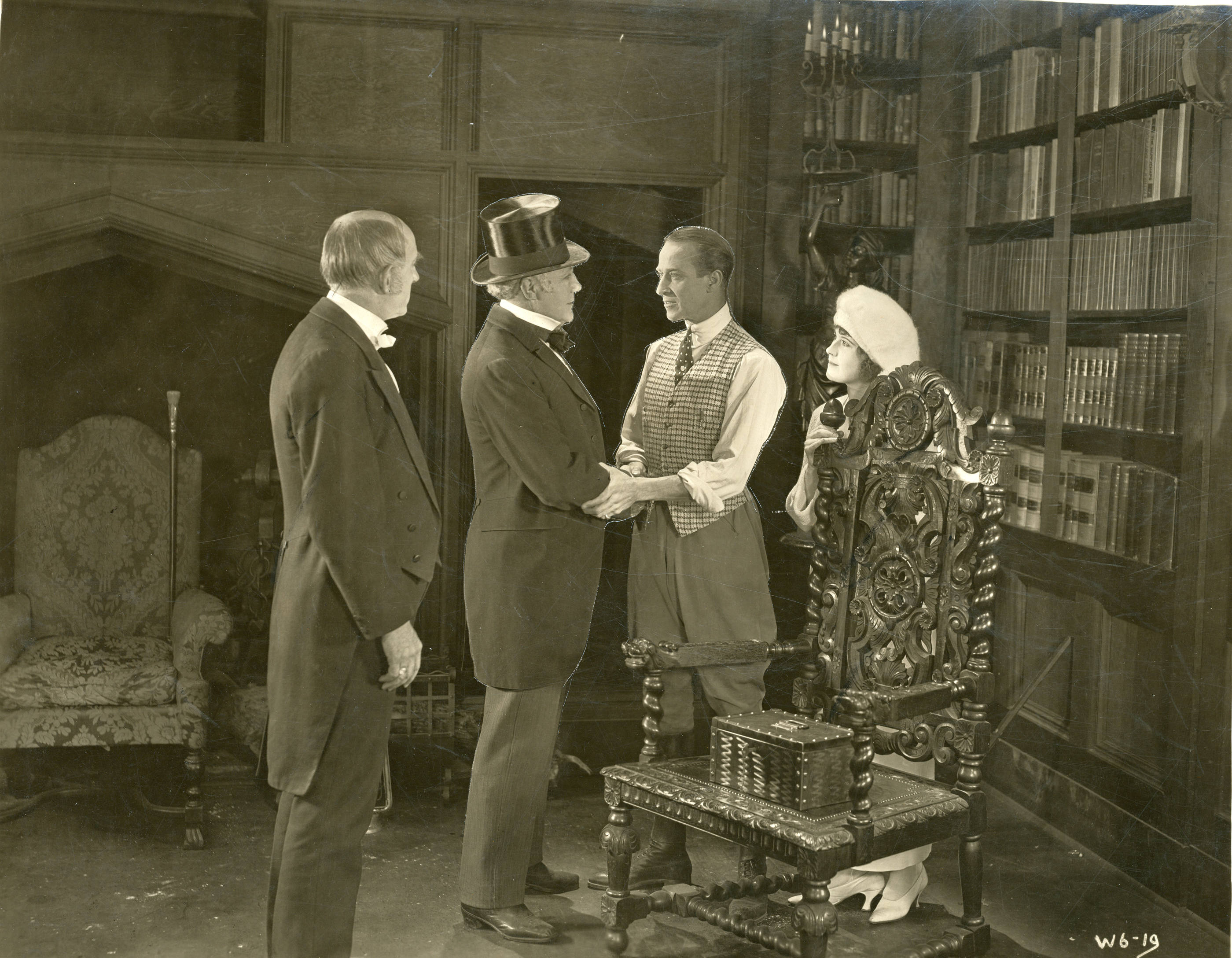
- Film still
- Directed by: Henry King
- Written by: Eugene B. Lewis
- Based on: House of a Thousand Candles by Meredith Nicholson
- Produced by: Jesse D. Hampton
- Starring: H.B. Warner; Edward Peil Sr. Charles Hill Mailes
- Cinematography: Victor Milner
- Production company: Jesse D. Hampton Productions
- Distributed by: Robertson-Cole Distributing Corporation
- Release dates: December 28, 1919 (New York City); January 13, 1922 (USA)
- Running time: 50 minutes
- Country: United States
- Language: Silent (English intertitles)

Haunting Shadows is a 1919 American silent comedy film directed by Henry King and starring H.B. Warner, Edward Peil Sr., and Charles Hill Mailes. It was based on 1906 novel which had previously been made into a 1915 silent film, and would later be remade by Republic Pictures as a sound film The House of a Thousand Candles.

== Cast ==
- H.B. Warner as John Glenarm
- Edward Peil Sr. as Arthur Pickering
- Charles Hill Mailes as Bates
- Frank Lanning as Morgan
- Florence Oberle as Sister Theresa
- Margaret Livingston as Marian Deveraux
- Harry Kendall as Reverend Paul Stoddard
- Patricia Fox as Gladys Armstrong
- Charles K. French as John Glenarm Sr

== Bibliography ==
- Donald W. McCaffrey & Christopher P. Jacobs. Guide to the Silent Years of American Cinema. Greenwood Publishing, 1999. ISBN 0-313-30345-2
