= Imar the Servitor =

- Written by: Daniel Carson Goodman
- Starring: William Garwood
- Distributed by: Mutual Film; Continental Feature Film Corporation
- Release date: April 1914
- Running time: 4 reels (original release)
- Country: United States
- Languages: Silent film English intertitles

Imar the Servitor is a 1914 American silent drama film written by Daniel Carson Goodman. The film stars William Garwood.

== Plot ==
Imar the Servitor rescues an American tourist who has lost his way in the desert and the two men become friends. Before he leaves, the American gives his friend a picture of his fiancée. When the tourist returns home, he discovers that his girlfriend has married a horseman, both of whom have journeyed to the Arabian desert. Imar's master attacks the trader's wife. Her husband then accuses her of infidelity and starts to beat her. Imar recognizes her from the picture given to him by his American friend and rescues her. They both traverse the desert and meet her former fiancé, who has been sent for. Her husband and Imar's master are slain, leaving the three friends free of any retribution.
