= Gentlemen Prefer Blondes =

Gentlemen Prefer Blondes may refer to:

- "Gentlemen Prefer Blondes", a 1922 song by Irving Berlin
- Gentlemen Prefer Blondes (novel), a 1925 novel by Anita Loos
  - Gentlemen Prefer Blondes (1926 play), a 1926 play based on the novel
  - Gentlemen Prefer Blondes (1928 film), a 1928 silent film adaptation of the novel, presumed lost, starring Ruth Taylor
  - Gentlemen Prefer Blondes (musical), the 1949 stage musical based on the novel, starring Carol Channing
    - Gentlemen Prefer Blondes (1953 film), a 1953 film adaptation of the stage musical, starring Jane Russell and Marilyn Monroe

== See also ==
- But Gentlemen Marry Brunettes, the 1927 sequel to Anita Loos' 1925 novel
- "Diamonds Are a Girl's Best Friend" (1949 song)
- Gentlemen Marry Brunettes, the sequel to the 1953 film
- "Material Girl" (1984 song)
