= Gentlemen Prefer Blondes (novel) =

1925 comic novel by Anita Loos

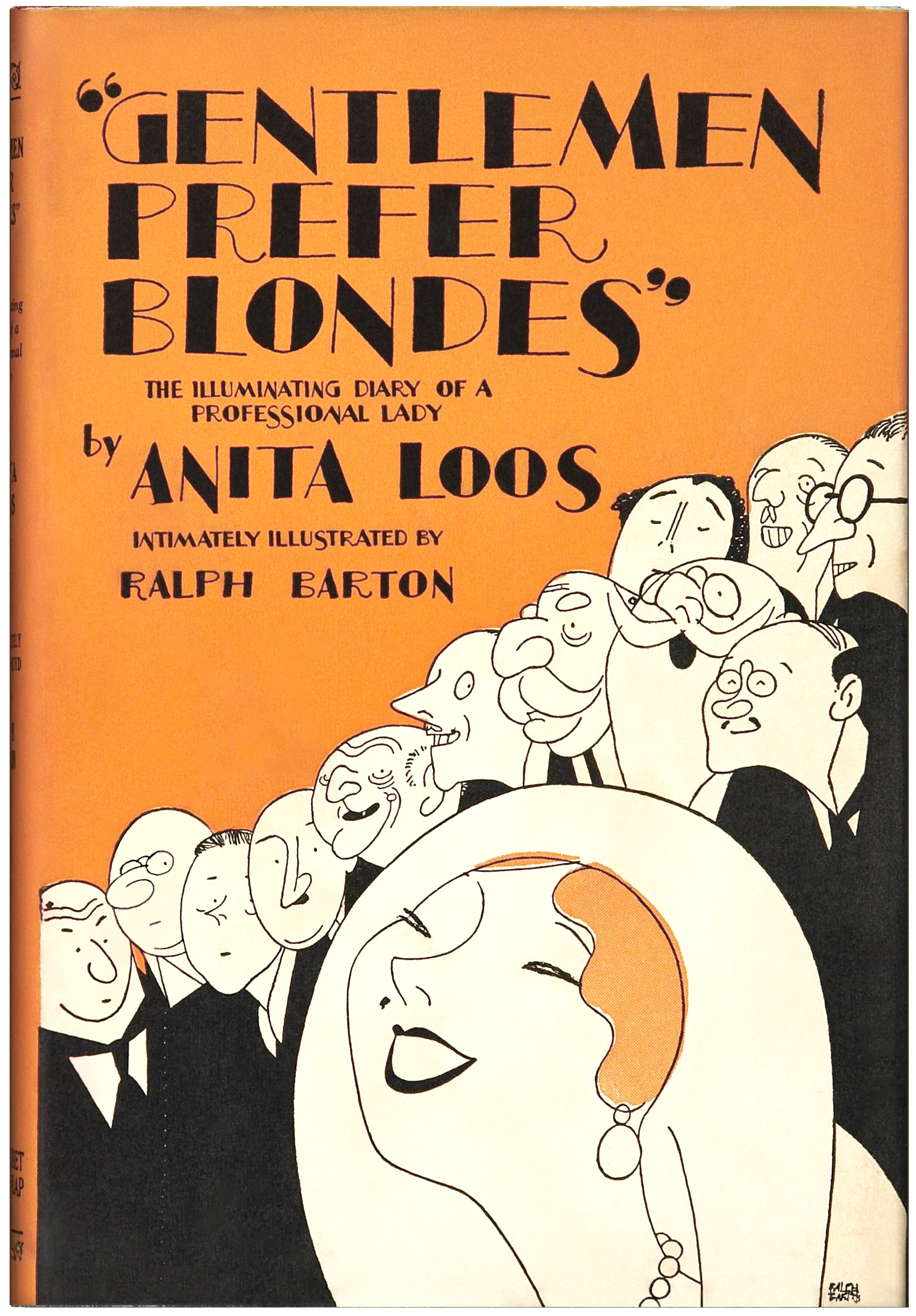
- Cover of the 1926 edition
- Author: Anita Loos
- Illustrator: Ralph Barton
- Language: English
- Genre: Comedy
- Published: November 1925
- Publisher: Boni & Liveright
- Publication place: United States
- Media type: Print (hardcover & paperback)
- Followed by: But Gentlemen Marry Brunettes
- Text: Gentlemen Prefer Blondes at Wikisource

Gentlemen Prefer Blondes: The Intimate Diary of a Professional Lady (Note: The first edition of the book has the title Gentlemen Prefer Blondes: The Intimate Diary of a Professional Lady on the front jacket. The book cover, spine, and interior title pages state the title as Gentlemen Prefer Blondes: The Illuminating Diary of a Professional Lady.) is a 1925 comic novel written by American author Anita Loos. The story follows the dalliances of a young blonde gold-digger and flapper named Lorelei Lee during "the bathtub-gin era of American history." Published the same year as F. Scott Fitzgerald's The Great Gatsby and Carl Van Vechten's Firecrackers, the lighthearted work is one of several notable 1925 American novels focusing on the carefree hedonism of the Jazz Age.

Originally serialized as sketches in Harper's Bazaar during the spring and summer of 1925, Boni & Liveright republished Loos's sketches in book form in November 1925. Although dismissed by critics as "too light in texture to be very enduring", the book garnered the praise of many writers, including F. Scott Fitzgerald, James Joyce, William Faulkner, and H. G. Wells. Edith Wharton hailed Loos's satirical work as "the great American novel" as the character of Lorelei Lee embodied the avarice and self-indulgence that characterized 1920s America during the presidencies of Warren G. Harding and Calvin Coolidge.

Loos's book became the second-best selling title of 1926 in the United States and a runaway international bestseller. It was printed worldwide in over 13 languages, including Russian and Chinese. By the time Loos died of a heart attack in 1981 at the age of 93, the work had been printed in over 85 editions and adapted into a 1926 comic strip, a 1926 Broadway play, a 1928 silent comedy, a 1949 Broadway musical, and a 1953 film adaptation of the musical.

Loos wrote a sequel, But Gentlemen Marry Brunettes, in 1927.

== Background ==
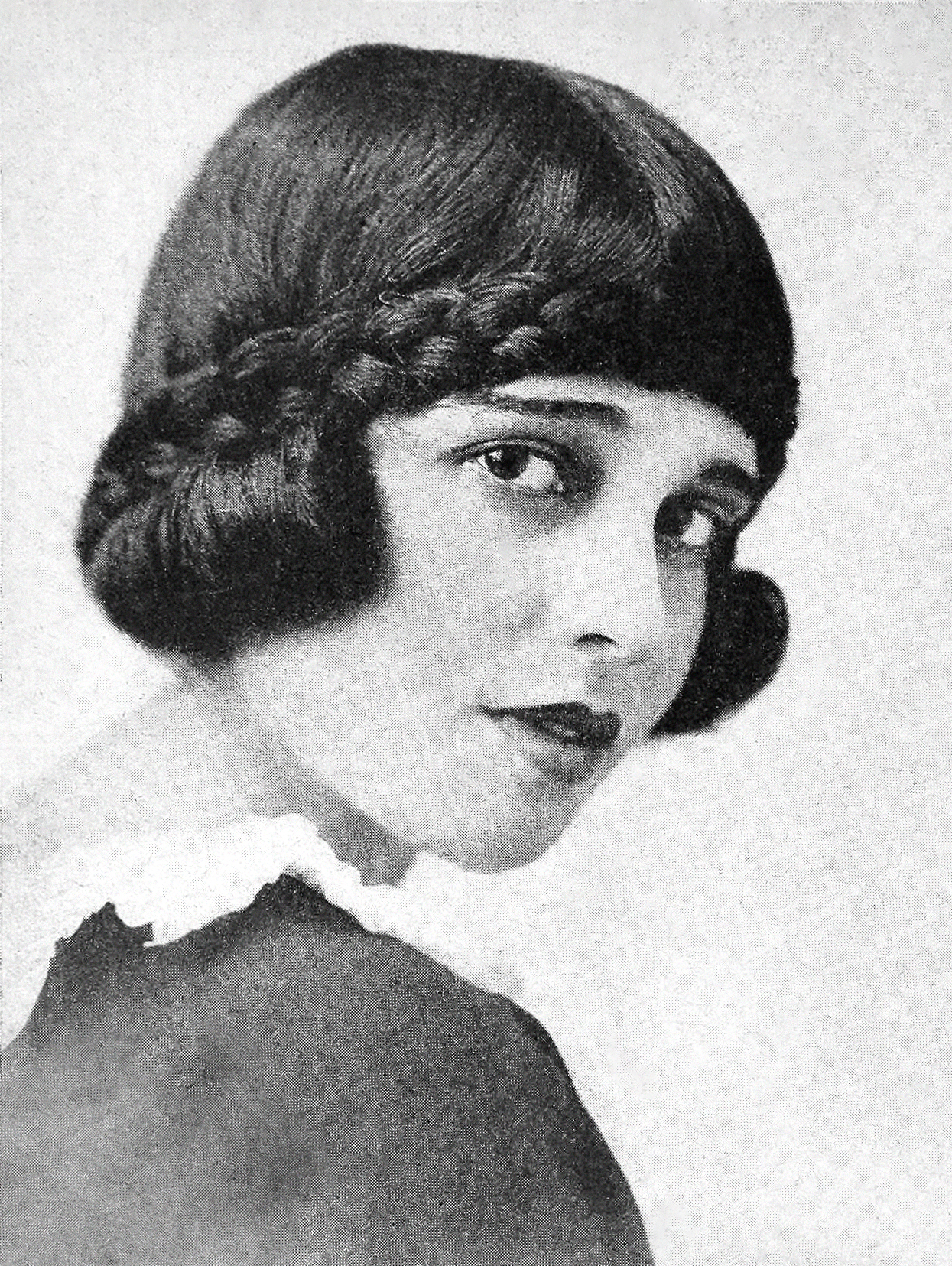
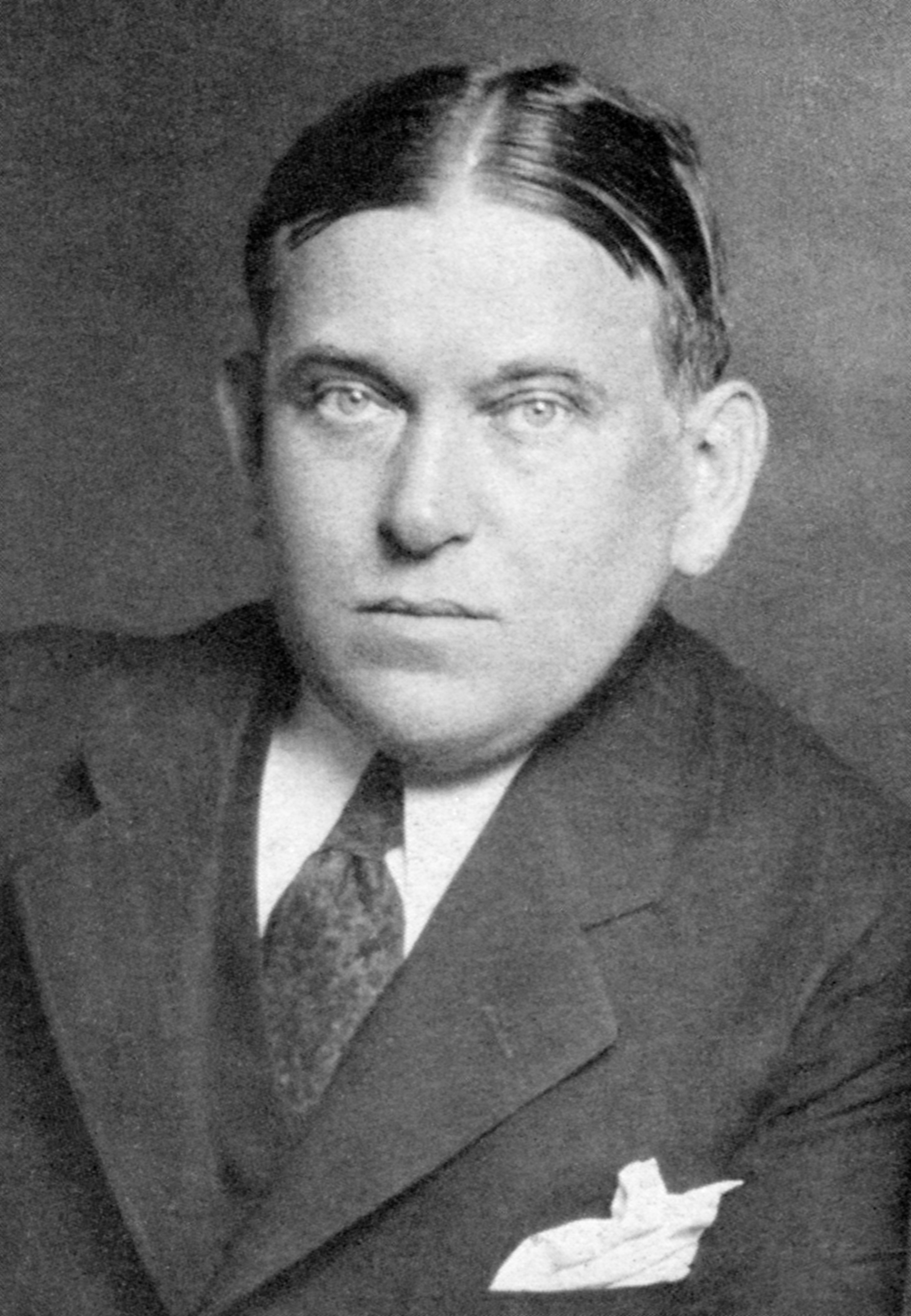
Anita Loos's jealousy over H. L. Mencken's attentions towards a young blonde actress inspired the premise of the story.

Over the years, Anita Loos told differing origin stories for Gentlemen Prefer Blondes, although each of the different origin stories involves an incident aboard a train. While working as a screenwriter in Hollywood, California, a 40-year-old Loos boarded a train either alone or with actor Douglas Fairbanks. Aboard the train, she encountered littérateur H. L. Mencken, the gruff editor of The Smart Set, in the company of an attractive young blonde, often identified as either actress Mae Davis or Mae Clarke.

As Loos lugged her heavy suitcases from their overhead racks while nearby men failed to offer any assistance whatsoever, the young blonde dropped her book, and several male bystanders jumped to retrieve it. As an attractive young brunette, Loos observed this stark contrast in the men's behavior and surmised that the difference stemmed from the other woman being a blonde.

During the train ride, Mencken, a close friend to whom Loos felt sexually attracted, continued focusing his attention on the young blonde and behaving like a love-struck simpleton. "Prompted by a flirtation that Henry Mencken was having with a stupid little blonde," Loos recalled, "I wrote a skit poking fun at his romance. I had no thought of it ever being printed". A jealous Loos jotted down the short story in the persona of a young blonde flapper recounting her dalliances in an intimate diary.

Upon arriving at her home, Loos forgot about the story, but she rediscovered the manuscript after unpacking her suitcases. Piqued at Mencken, she placed the manuscript in an envelope and mailed it to him. Mencken enjoyed the deprecatory piece and forwarded the manuscript to Henry Sell, the editor of Harper's Bazaar. Sell accepted the story for publication, and he urged Loos to continue writing about the blonde flapper's escapades. Due to the popularity of Loos's stories, the magazine's circulation skyrocketed, and Boni & Liveright published the stories in book form in November 1925.

== Plot summary ==
A kiss on the hand may make you feel very nice, but a diamond and sapphire bracelet lasts forever.

— Lorelei Lee, Gentlemen Prefer Blondes

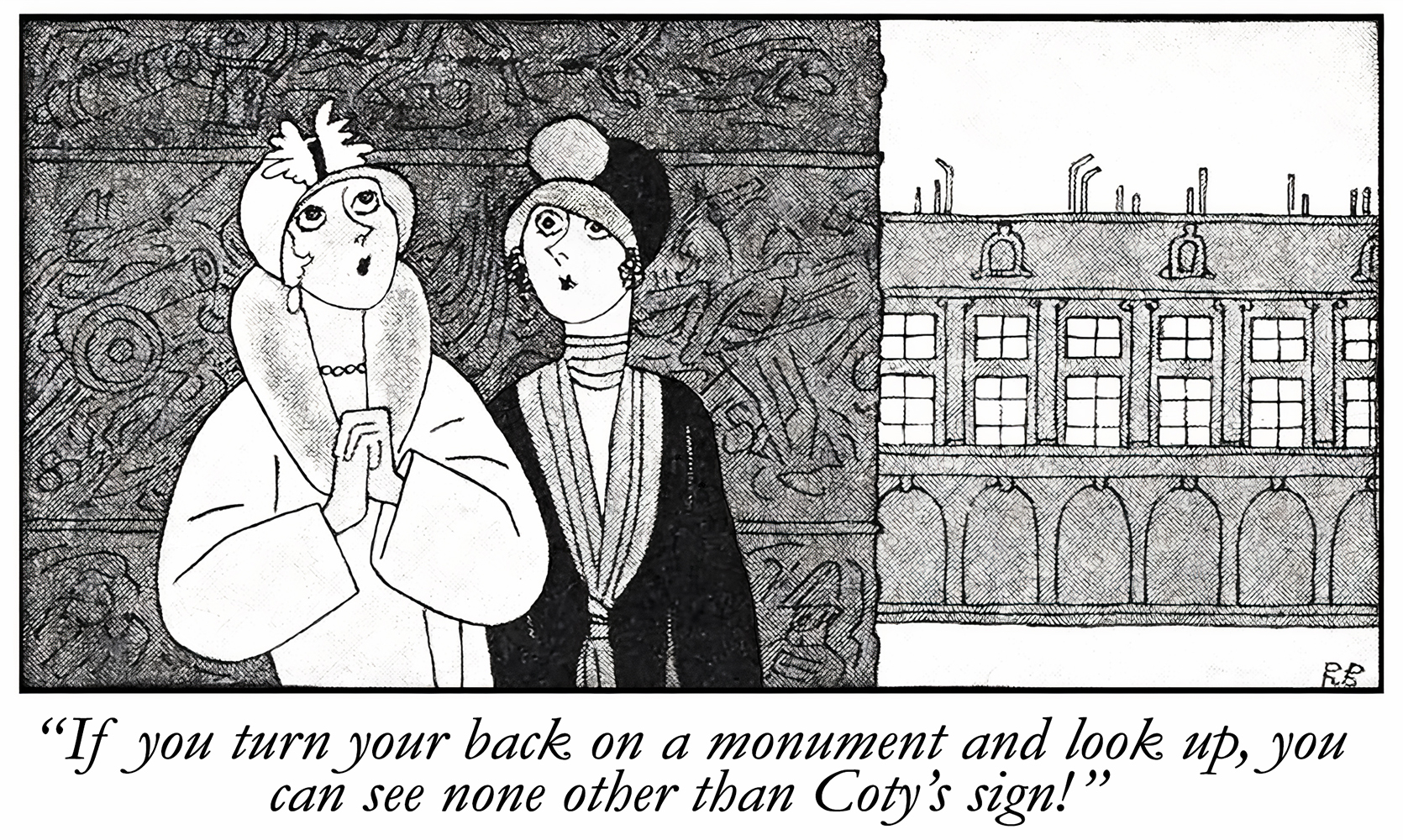
Lorelei Lee (left) and Dorothy Shaw (right) arrive in 1920s Paris, where Lorelei spots a Coty's sign.

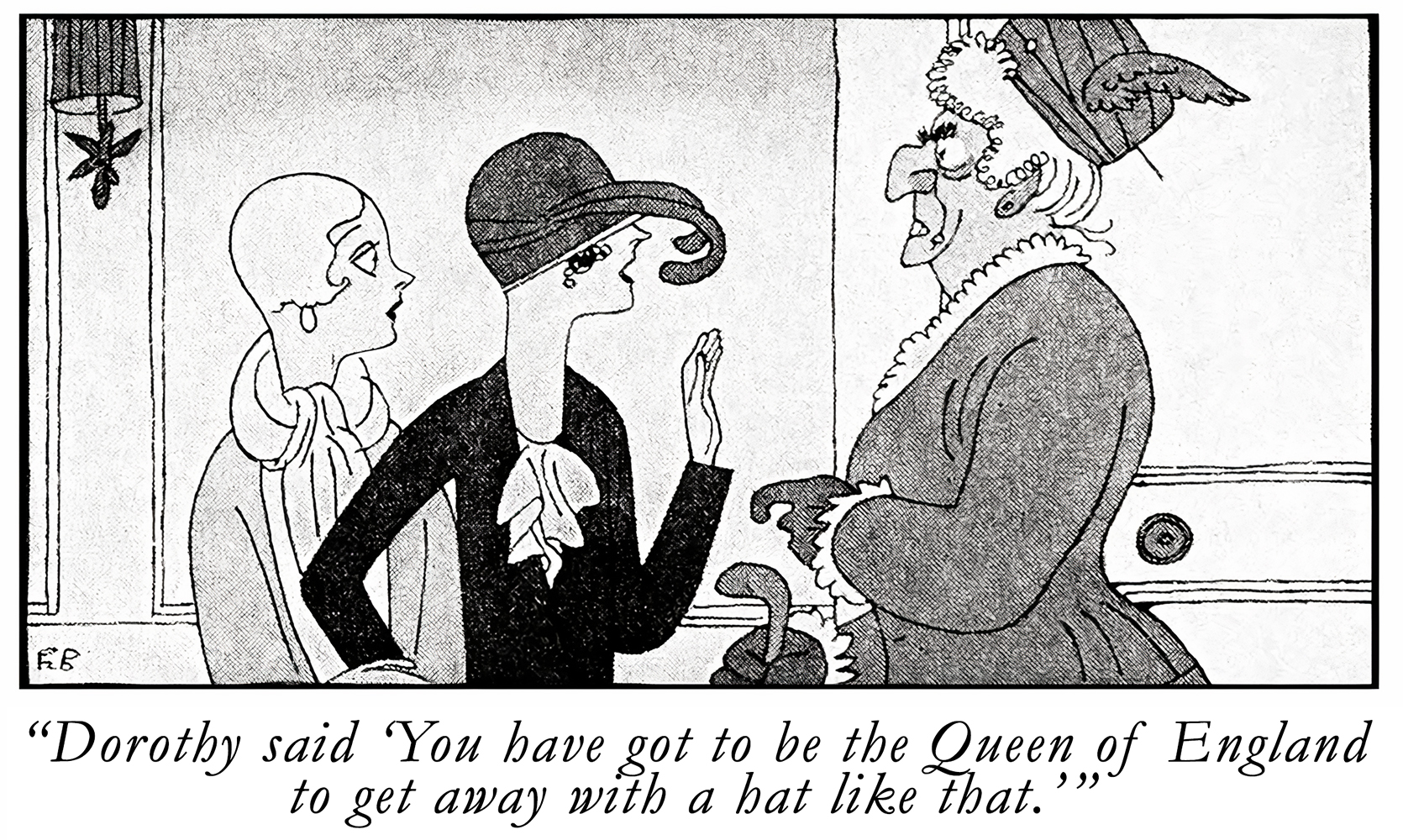
Lady Beekman (right) confronts Lorelei and Dorothy and demands the return of her tiara.

Born in Arkansas, (Note: Loos chose Arkansas as Lorelei's birthplace due to H. L. Mencken's 1917 essay on American culture where he castigated the state for its ignorant inhabitants and branded it as "the Sahara of the Bozart"—a pun on the Southern pronunciation of "beaux-arts".) a blonde flapper named Lorelei Lee meets Gus Eisman, a Chicago businessman whom she calls "Daddy". He installs her in a New York City apartment and "educates" her. He pays for jewelry from Cartier, dinners at the Ritz, and tickets to the Ziegfeld Follies. During this time, she meets novelist Gerry Lamson. He wishes to "save" her from Eisman and asks her to marry him. Not wishing to forgo a trip to Europe paid for by Eisman, Lorelei spurns Lamson. Meanwhile, Lorelei criticizes her friend Dorothy Shaw for wasting her time with a poor writer named Mencken, (Note: This is a reference to Loos's friend, H. L. Mencken, a literary magazine editor and essayist. Loos felt sexually attracted to Mencken and regarded him as "an idol to adore for a lifetime".) the editor of a dull magazine, (Note: This is a reference to H. L. Mencken's literary magazine, The Smart Set, one of the era's most vogue publications.) instead of pursuing wealthy men.

Sailing for Europe with Dorothy on the RMS Majestic, (Note: In 1925, the RMS Majestic was the largest passenger ship in the world and an internationally famous icon during the Jazz Age.) Lorelei learns that Bartlett, a former district attorney who is now a senator, is aboard the ship. She recounts a dubious backstory in which a lawyer employed her as a stenographer, and she shot him to defend her virtue. During the trial, which Bartlett prosecuted, Lorelei gave such "compelling" testimony that the all-male jury acquitted her. The judge bought her a ticket to Hollywood so that she could use her acting talents to become a star. Due to her siren-like personality, he nicknamed her "Lorelei". (Note: The name "Lorelei" is a reference to the 1801 poem by German author Clemens Brentano recounting the story of a siren who bewitches men and causes their deaths. See folklore regarding Lorelei.) Lorelei exacts revenge on Bartlett by seducing him and revealing secrets about his senatorial activities.

Arriving in England, the Tower of London fails to impress Dorothy and Lorelei as it is smaller than "the Hickox building in Little Rock". Invited to a soirée where English aristocrats sell counterfeit jewels to naive tourists, Lorelei encounters an elderly matron who is selling a diamond tiara. Lorelei casts her eye around the room for a wealthy man to buy it for her and settles on Sir Francis Beekman, whom she calls "Piggie". With flattery and the promise of discretion due to his matrimonial status, she persuades him to buy the tiara.

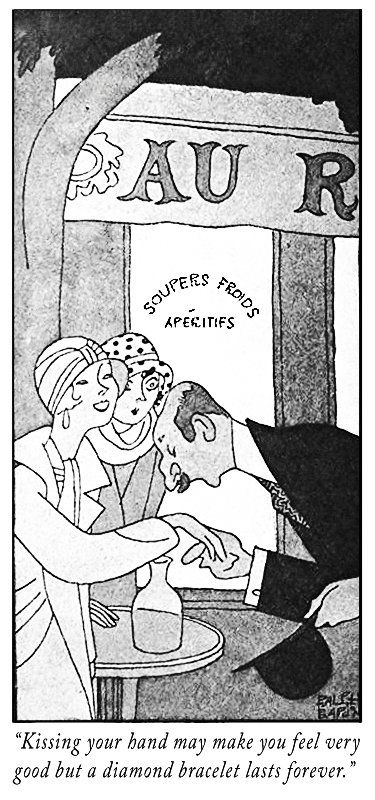
Illustration by Ralph Barton

In Paris, the duo are more excited by jewelry shops than by the "Eyeful Tower". Beekman's wife confronts Lorelei and threatens to ruin her reputation if she does not return the tiara. Dorothy dismisses Lady Beekman's threats as hollow since Lorelei has no reputation to destroy. Later, a French lawyer and his son acting on behalf of Lady Beekman confront the flappers. Impressed by the women's beauty, the father and son dine with them and charge all expenses to Lady Beekman. Lorelei makes a replica of the tiara and sends them away with the fake one.

Eisman arrives in Paris and, after shopping trips with Lorelei, he departs for Vienna. He puts Lorelei and Dorothy on the Orient Express where she encounters Henry Spoffard, a staunch Presbyterian, prohibitionist, and moral reformer who delights in censoring movies. To gain his trust, Lorelei pretends that she is a reformer too and claims that she is trying to save Dorothy from her sinful lifestyle. Lorelei begins two-timing Eisman and Spoffard.

In Vienna, Lorelei meets "Dr. Froyd" who fails to psycho-analyze her because she never represses her inhibitions. Lorelei tells her past history to Spoffard who weeps at the moral outrages supposedly endured by Lorelei and likens her to Mary Magdalene. Meeting his mother, Lorelei claims to be a Christian Scientist and that her religion encourages drinking champagne. While drunk together, Lorelei gives his mother a cloche hat. Since Spoffard's mother has an Edwardian hairstyle, Lorelei bobs her hair for the hat to fit. Soon after, Spoffard proposes marriage to Lorelei by letter. She plans to use this letter as evidence of breach of promise and obtain a financial settlement.

Tiring of Spoffard, Lorelei nudges him towards breach of promise by embarking on a shopping spree and charging it to his account. After doing so, her paramour Gilbertson Montrose, a handsome screenwriter, advises her to marry Spoffard so that he will finance Montrose's new movie starring Lorelei. Deciding to wed Spoffard while pursuing a clandestine liaison with Montrose, Lorelei rushes to Spoffard and claims she faked her extravagance to test his love. A remorseful Spoffard vows to marry her and to finance Montrose's film.

== Major characters ==
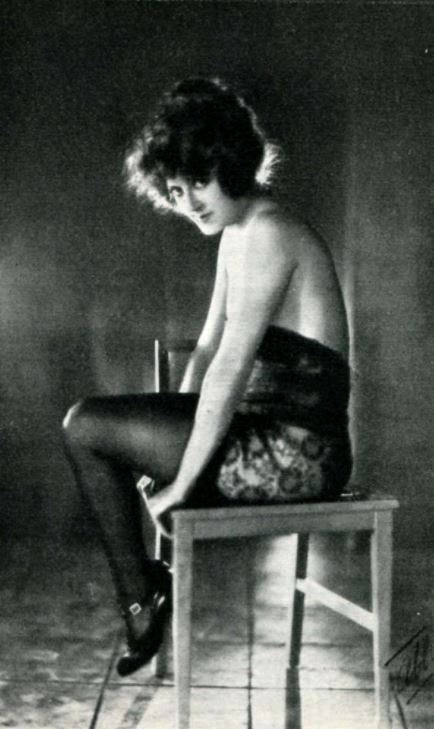
Writer Anita Loos based Lorelei Lee's obsession with diamonds on Ziegfeld Follies showgirl Lillian Lorraine's penchant for "all things sterling, forty-carat or unflawed".

- Lorelei Lee—a young blonde flapper and gold digger (Note: According to Loos, during the Jazz Age, "a girl's chief asset was the allure with which she disguised her normal acquisitiveness. That type reached its perfection in the gold diggers of the Twenties.") from Arkansas who epitomizes the insouciant hedonism and unbridled avarice of the Jazz Age. Originally inspired by Mae Davis or Mae Clarke, actresses Peggy Hopkins Joyce and Lillian Lorraine also partly inspired the character. As the most notorious of Florenz Ziegfeld's showgirls, Lorraine purportedly adored "all things sterling, forty-carat or unflawed, and she collected so many trinkets that when forced to sell the lot at the height of the [Great] Depression, she pocketed over two hundred thousand dollars."
- Dorothy Shaw—Lorelei's world-weary and perceptive brunette companion based on Loos herself as well as her friend, actress Constance Talmadge.
- Henry Spoffard—a staunch Presbyterian reformer and film censor whom Loos based on teetotaling and moralizing Hollywood film czar Will H. Hays.
- Sir Francis Beekman—a toothless flirt nicknamed "Piggie" who gives a diamond tiara to Lorelei in exchange for her physical affections. Loos modeled the character on writer Joseph Hergesheimer and producer Jesse L. Lasky who pestered Loos and other attractive young women at Hollywood soirées.
- Lady Beekman—the wife of Sir Francis Beekman who stalks Lorelei and Dorothy to France in order to obtain the tiara which her husband gifted to the blonde flapper.
- Gus Eisman—a wealthy international businessman known as "the Button King of Chicago" who serves as Lorelei's sugar daddy until she later weds Henry Spoffard. The character resembles globe-trotting entrepreneur and con-artist Ivar Kreuger, popularly known as "the Match King" during the Twenties.
- Edward Goldmark—a film producer based on Polish-American impresario Samuel Goldwyn who cultivated young blonde actresses such as Anna Sten.
- Gilbertson Montrose—a handsome young Hollywood screenwriter with whom Lorelei plans to have an extramarital affair after her marriage to Spoffard. The character was likely modeled upon Anita Loos's husband, screenwriter John Emerson.

== Critical reception ==
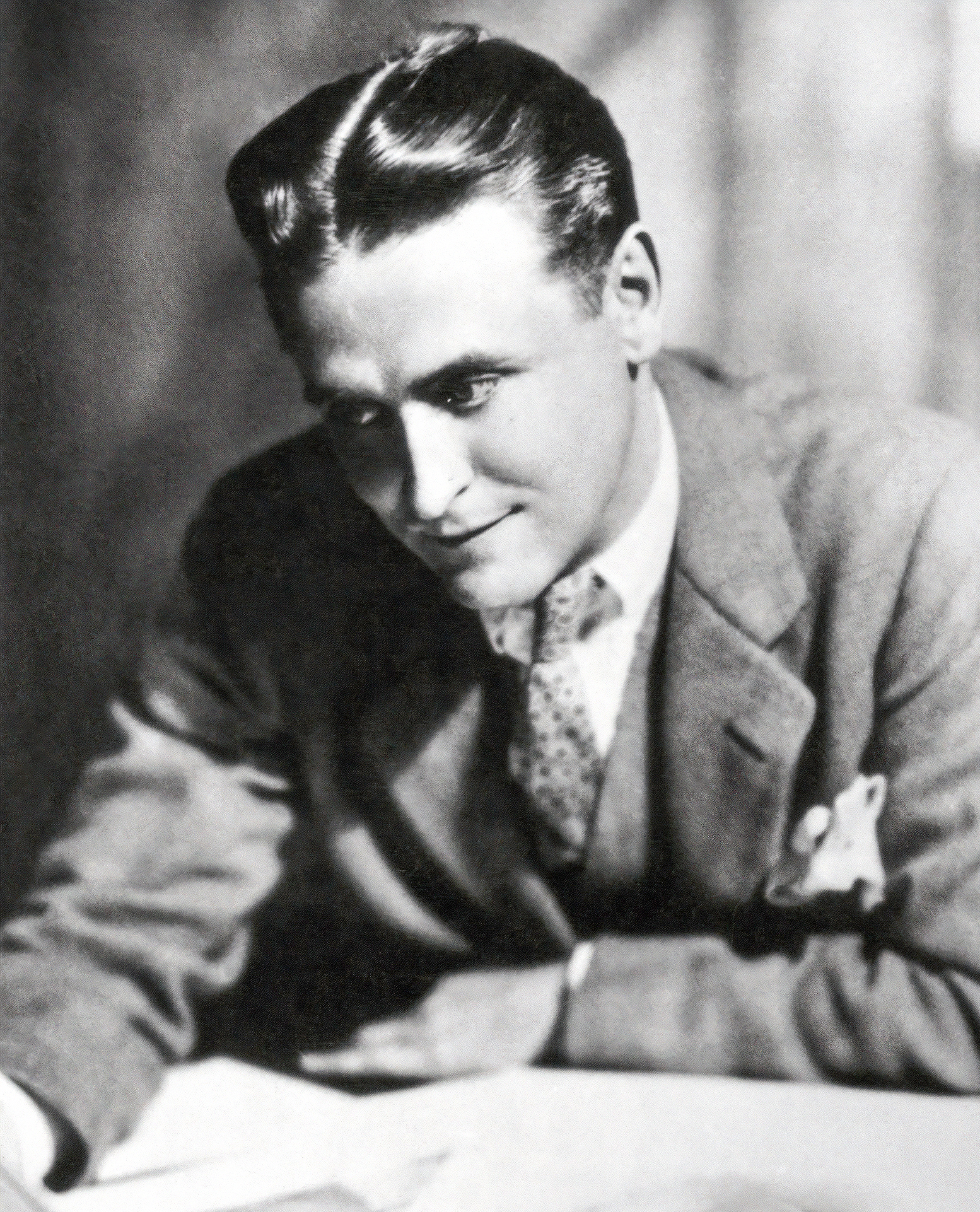
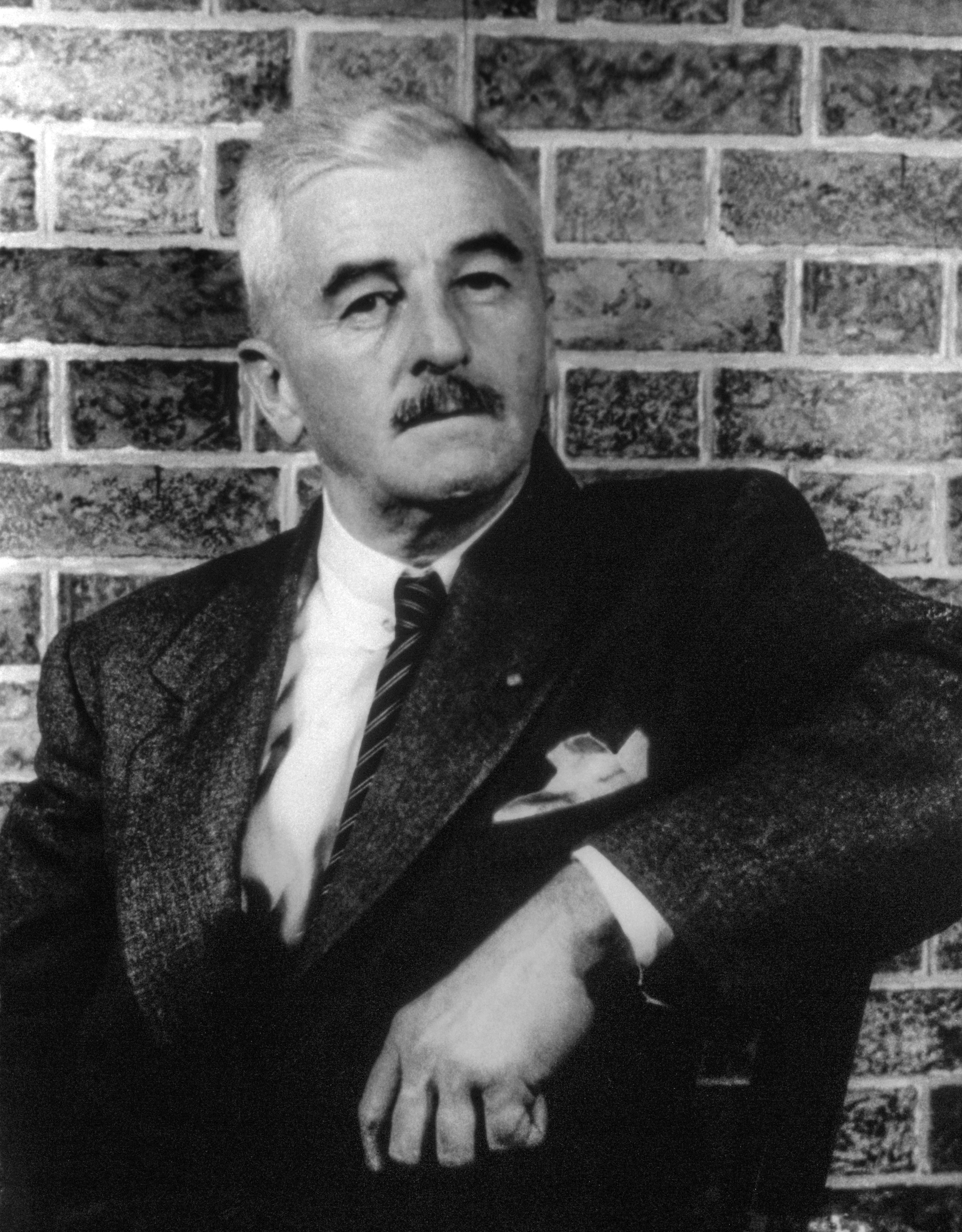
F. Scott Fitzgerald (left) and William Faulkner (right) both praised Loos's satirical novel.

Gentlemen Prefer Blondes became an instant success the moment it hit bookstores in November 1925 and sold out all copies on the day it was released. A second edition of 60,000 copies sold out within the next thirty days. Afterward, the novel sold an average of 1,000 copies per day. Loos's work became the second-best selling title of 1926 in the United States and outsold F. Scott Fitzgerald's The Great Gatsby, Theodore Dreiser's An American Tragedy, Ernest Hemingway's In Our Time, Ezra Pound's The Cantos, and William Faulkner's Soldiers' Pay.

Although the book became a commercial success, the critical response proved mixed. Reviewer Herman J. Mankiewicz, the future screenwriter of Citizen Kane, lauded Loos's book in The New York Times and described the novel as "a gorgeously smart and intelligent piece of work". Whereas some reviewers described the work as "droll and merry", "side-splittingly funny", and "sly and sophisticated"; other reviewers were less enthusiastic and patently unamused. Ruth Goodman in The New York Tribune disliked Loos's misspelling words for comedic effect, and columnist Doris Blake in The New York Daily News criticized Loos for asserting that blondes are more sexually appealing to men than brunettes.

Despite the mixed critical reviews, other authors heaped copious praise upon the work. William Faulkner wrote a personal letter to Loos after reading her novel. Filled with congratulatory remarks, Faulkner lauded the brilliance of Gentlemen Prefer Blondes and complimented Loos regarding the originality of her characters such as Dorothy Shaw. Aldous Huxley, author of the dystopian novel Brave New World, likewise wrote a letter of praise to Loos. As a result of this letter, Huxley and Loos met in 1926 when the British novelist visited America for the first time.

I have just read the Blonde book.... Please accept my envious congratulations on [the character of] Dorothy.... My God, it's charming.... I am still rather Victorian in my prejudices regarding the intelligence of women, despite Elinor Wylie and Willa Cather and all the balance of them. But I wish I had thought of Dorothy first.

— William Faulkner, letter to Anita Loos

[I am] now reading the great American novel (at last!) and I want to know if there are—or will be—others and if you know the young woman, who must be a genius.

— Edith Wharton, postcard to Frank Crowninshield

Among the list of names of other great authors from the time period, F. Scott Fitzgerald, E. B. White, Sherwood Anderson, William Empson, Rose Macauley, Arnold Bennett, H. G. Wells, James Joyce, and Edith Wharton all praised Loos's novel. Wharton declared Gentlemen Prefer Blondes as "the great American novel", ostensibly because the character of Lorelei Lee embodied the avarice, frivolity, and immoderation that characterized 1920s America during Warren G. Harding and Calvin Coolidge years. James Joyce stated that—even though his eyesight was failing him—he "reclined on a sofa reading Gentlemen Prefer Blondes for three days" while taking a break from writing Finnegans Wake.

George Santayana, the Spanish-American philosopher, facetiously averred that Gentlemen Prefer Blondes was "the best book on philosophy written by an American". Arnold Bennett and H. G. Wells escorted Loos out to dinner when she visited London as a reward for her excellent work. Even the Prince of Wales was reported to have been so amused by the novel that he purchased many copies of the book and gave them to his companions.

The work's popularity crossed national borders into countries such as the Republic of China and the Soviet Union, and the book was translated into more than a dozen different languages and published in 85 editions. In 1927, Loos wrote a well-received sequel, But Gentlemen Marry Brunettes. Several decades later, Loos was asked during a television interview in London whether she intended to write a third book. She facetiously replied that the title and theme of a third book would be Gentlemen Prefer Gentlemen. This remark resulted in the interview's abrupt termination.

== Critical analysis ==
Critics in socialist countries interpreted the work to be an anti-capitalist polemic. "When the book reached Russia," Loos recalled, "it was embraced by Soviet authorities as evidence of the exploitation of helpless female blondes by predatory magnates of the capitalistic system. The Russians, with their native love of grief, stripped Gentlemen Prefer Blondes of all its fun and the plot which they uncovered was dire."

These reviews focused on the "rape of its heroine, an attempt by her to commit murder, the heroine being cast adrift in the gangster-infested New York of Prohibition days, her relentless pursuit by predatory males, her renunciation of the only man who ever stirred her inner soul as a woman, her nauseous connection with a male who is repulsive to her physically, mentally and emotionally and her final engulfment in the grim monotony of suburban Philadelphia". Loos denied any such intentions in the work and was amused by such interpretations.

Although Loos publicly ridiculed any social or gender interpretations of her comedic novel, contemporary literary critics have nonetheless posited such critiques of the novel, delving into various interpretations of sex and the body.

== Adaptations ==
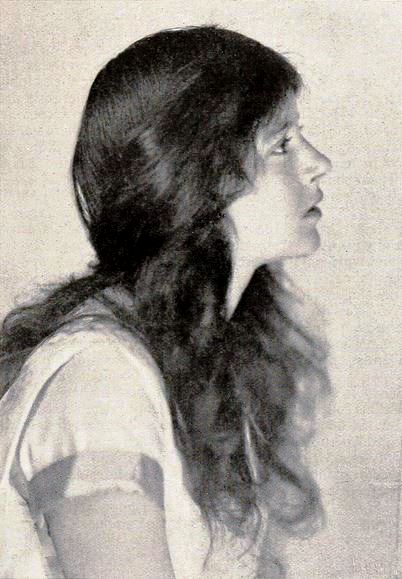
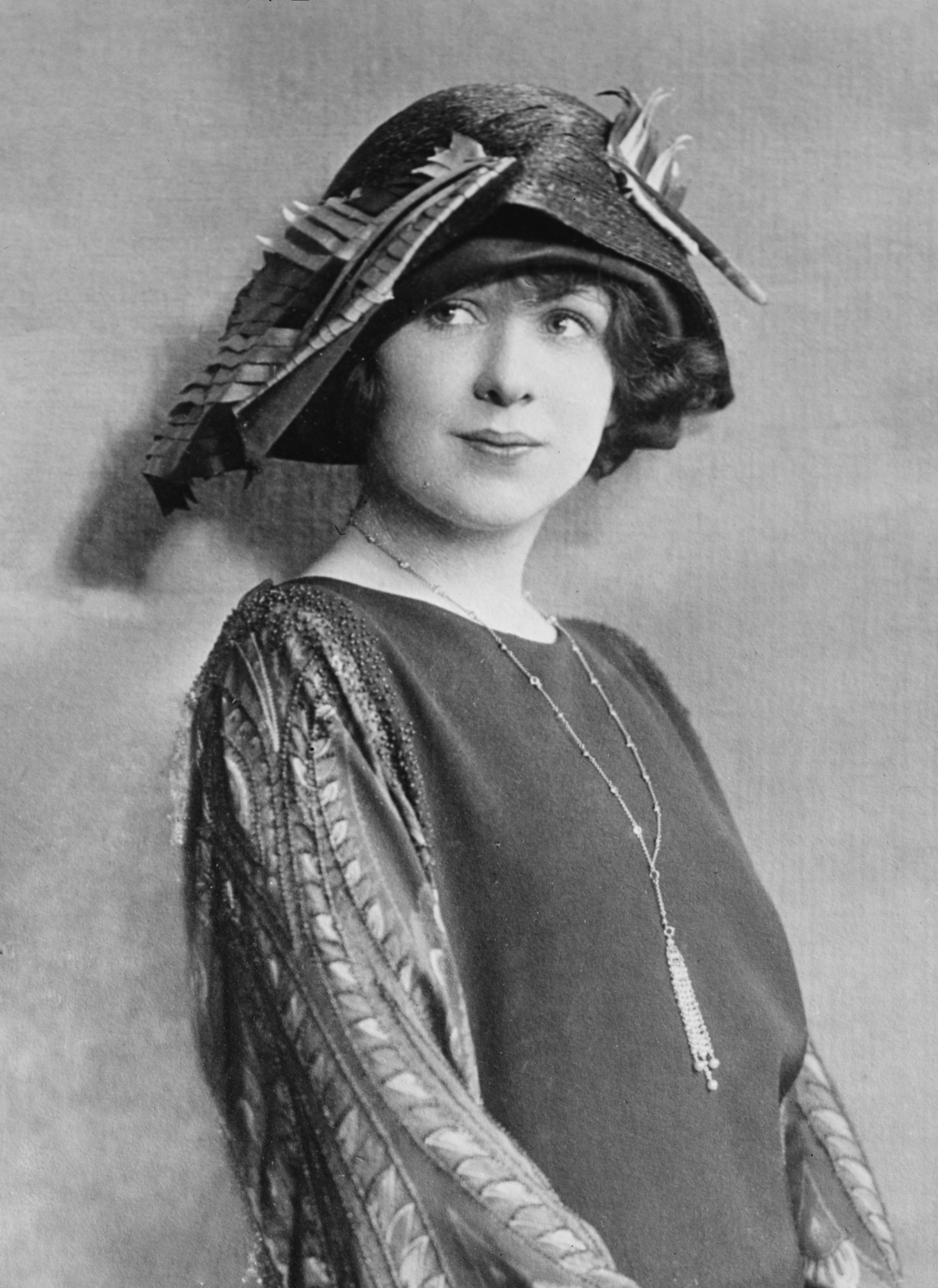
June Walker (left) portrayed Lorelei and Edna Hibbard (right) portrayed Dorothy in the 1926 play.

Following the widespread success of the book, Broadway impresario Florenz Ziegfeld contacted Loos and suggested that he adapt the story as a glamorous musical. Ziegfeld said that actress Marilyn Miller—one of the most popular Broadway musical stars of the 1920s—should play the siren role of Lorelei Lee. To her regret, Loos had already signed a contract with rival Broadway producer Edgar Selwyn to adapt the story as a straight comedy, and she could not break the contract.

Under the contract with Selwyn, Loos and her playwright husband John Emerson adapted the novel as a Broadway stage play. Brunette June Walker was cast as Lorelei and performed the role in a blonde wig. Comedienne Edna Hibbard played Dorothy and Frank Morgan portrayed reformer Henry Spoffard. The play debuted in Detroit on April 28, 1926, and was performed 201 times from 1926 to 1927.

As the first actress to portray Lorelei Lee on Broadway, June Walker was instrumental in an interpretation that helped define the character. She "played a role that was as much her creation as that of Anita Loos." "Tossing her golden curls, blinking her eyes and twirling her waist-length string of pearls", Walker's version of Lorelei embodied the flapper of the Roaring Twenties. The success of the play launched Walker's career, and she had further Broadway successes.

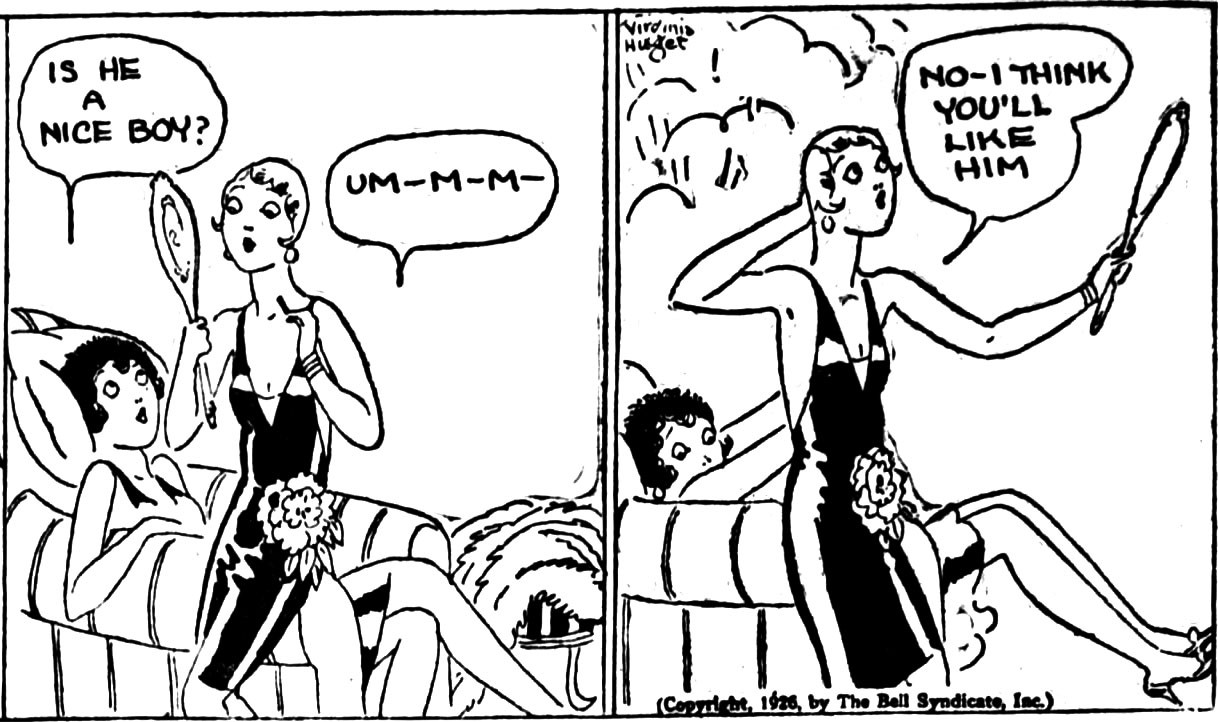
Excerpt from the July 20, 1926 installment of the comic strip, drawn by Virginia Huget

Loos licensed her novel to the Bell Syndicate for use in a daily newspaper comic strip series. Earning Loos nearly $100 per week in licensing fees (equivalent to $1,819 in 2025), the strip ran from June 7 to October 2, 1926. The strip mixed adaptations of moments from the novel with new gags featuring the characters of Lorelei and Dorothy. The strip was credited to Loos, with art supplied by Virginia Huget, the start of her career drawing flapper comics. Huget was touted as a fashion expert who could draw Lorelei and Dorothy in the latest clothes. Artist Phil Cook later replaced Huget. Newspapers reprinted this original 1926 series from 1929 to the early 1930s.

In 1928, the book was adapted as a silent Paramount motion picture. Under that contract, Loos and her husband Emerson wrote the screenplay and had "to prepare the final scenario, select the cast, and have a hand in supervising the production", as well as write the inter-titles. The film was directed by Malcolm St. Clair, and Lorelei Lee was played by Ruth Taylor. Loos hand-picked her for the role because she bore "a remarkable resemblance to Ralph Barton's illustrations in the book". Loos described Taylor's performance as "so ideal for the role that she even played it off-screen and married a wealthy broker."

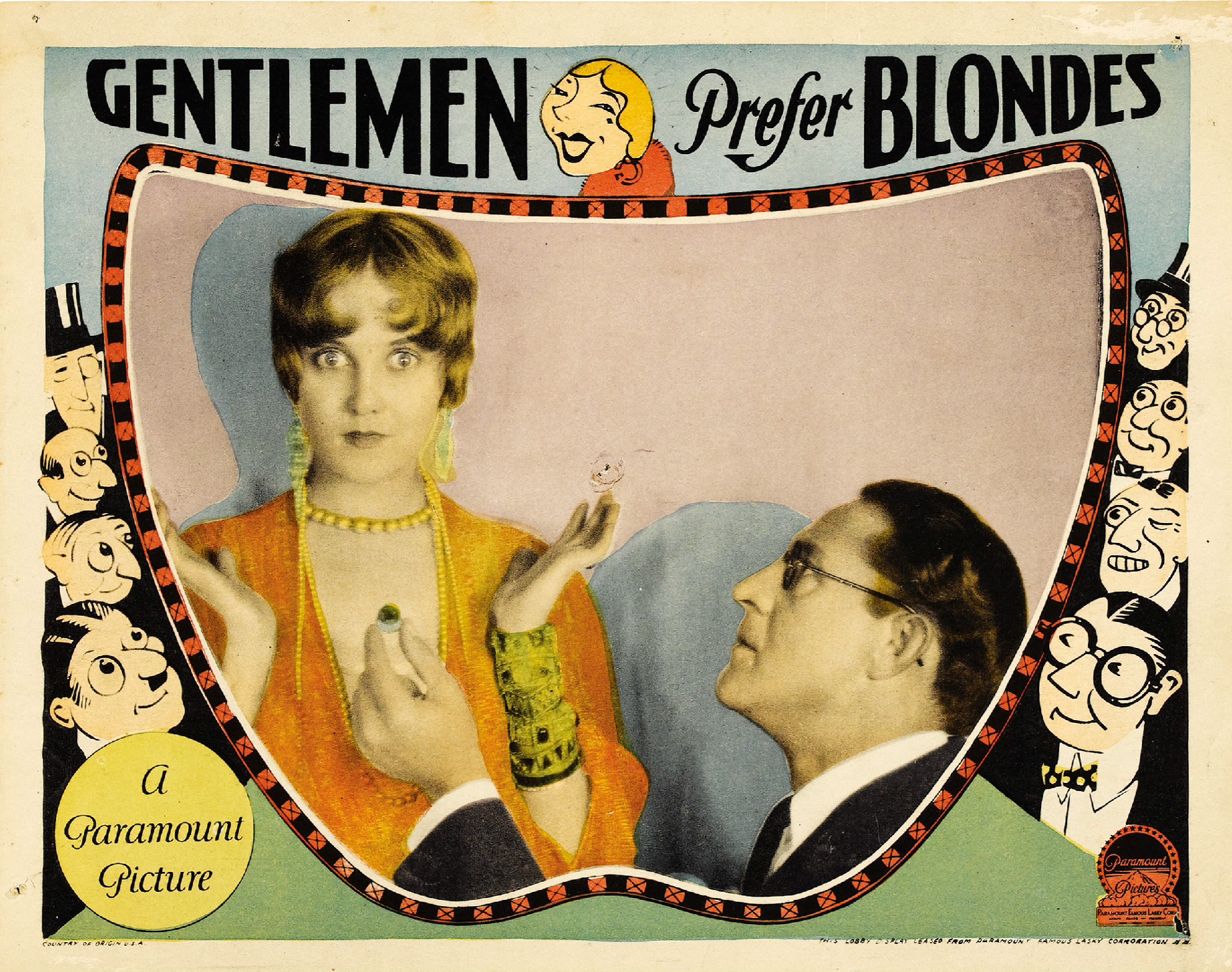
Lobby card from the American comedy film Gentlemen Prefer Blondes (1928) starring Ruth Taylor

Following the film's success, Taylor married a prominent New York City businessman and became a Park Avenue socialite. For the 1928 film, Loos altered the story to include a prologue featuring Lorelei's grandfather as a gold-obsessed prospector and an epilogue in which Lorelei's impoverished Arkansas family learn via radio of her lavish wedding.

By 1929, Loos' gold-digger epic had been adapted for a variety of different mediums: "It had been done in book form and serialized in magazines and syndicated in newspapers and designed into dress material and printed into wall paper and made into a comic strip and had even had a song by Irving Berlin."

Over a decade later, in 1941, theater director John C. Wilson suggested that Loos permit a musical adaptation of the story. Wilson's desired version never came to fruition. The musical adaptation was produced by Herman Levin and Oliver Smith, whom Loos met while sailing on a steamship to the United States from Europe. The 1949 musical edition starred Carol Channing as Lorelei Lee and Yvonne Adair as Dorothy Shaw, and ran for 740 performances on Broadway. The musical's success prompted a brief sartorial revival of 1920s fashions by dress factories.

The second and more popular film adaptation of the novel was derived from the 1949 musical and released in 1953 by 20th Century Fox. This second adaptation was filmed in technicolor and featured Marilyn Monroe as Lorelei and Jane Russell as Dorothy. In order to conform to the moral precepts of the Motion Picture Production Code, much of the sexual promiscuity of the 1949 musical was expurgated in the 1953 film adaptation as film censors in the 1950s United States deemed any authentic cinematic interpretation of the bygone Jazz Age—with its libertine sexuality and bra-less flappers—to be impermissible.

== See also ==
- Gentlemen Prefer Blondes (1926 play)
- Gentlemen Prefer Blondes (1928 film)
- Gentlemen Prefer Blondes (musical)
- Gentlemen Prefer Blondes (1953 film)
