= This Thing Called Love (1929 film) =

1929 film

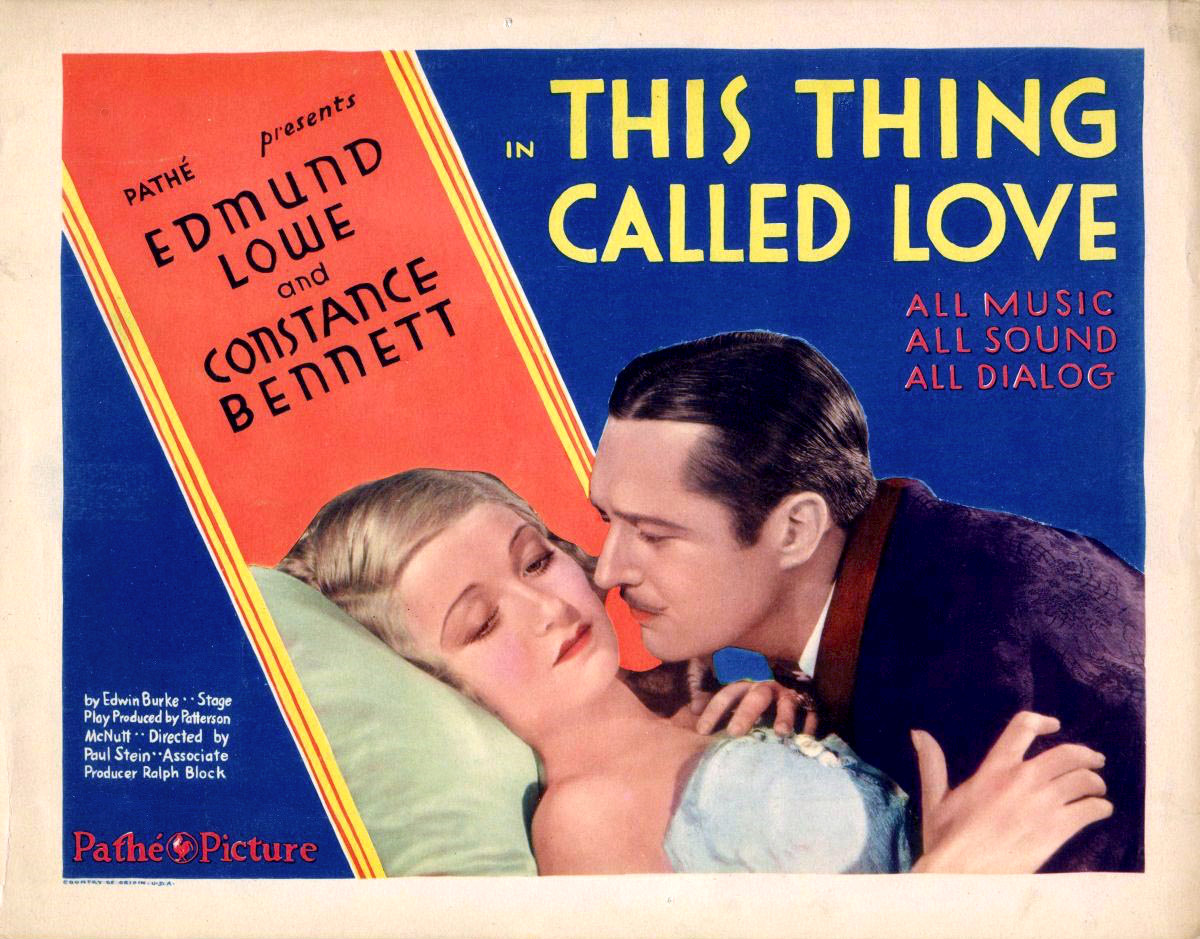
- Lobby card from the film
- Directed by: Paul L. Stein; E. J. Babille (assistant)
- Written by: Horace Jackson (adaptation)
- Screenplay by: Horace Jackson
- Based on: This Thing Called Love, a Comedy in Three Acts; 1928 play by Edwin J. Burke
- Produced by: Ralph Block
- Starring: Edmund Lowe; Constance Bennett; Ruth Taylor; Roscoe Karns; ZaSu Pitts
- Cinematography: Norbert Brodin
- Edited by: Doane Harrison
- Production company: Pathé Exchange
- Distributed by: Pathé Exchange
- Release date: December 13, 1929 (United States)
- Running time: 72 minutes
- Country: United States
- Language: English

This Thing Called Love is a 1929 American romantic comedy pre-Code film directed by Paul L. Stein and starring Edmund Lowe, Constance Bennett, Ruth Taylor, Roscoe Karns, and ZaSu Pitts. Jean Harlow appears in a cameo role as she was not yet famous. The film is based on the play This Thing Called Love, a Comedy in Three Acts, by Edwin J. Burke.

The film was recorded in RCA Photophone and featured a two-color Multicolor sequence. The color sequence lasts three minutes and takes place in a cafe setting. No complete copy of the film survives, only the Multicolor sequence.

== Plot ==
A man returns from a trip to Peru rich and looking for a wife. While still single, he has a real estate agent show him a house or two. The agent invites him to dinner, during which the agent and his wife start bickering, causing the poor fellow to rethink marriage over. He does still want to share his home with someone, however, so he has the agent's sister-in-law move in. Eventually, they fell in love.

== Cast ==
- Edmund Lowe as Robert Collins
- Constance Bennett as Ann Marvin
- Roscoe Karns as Harry Bertrand
- ZaSu Pitts as Clara Bertrand
- Carmelita Geraghty as Alvarez Guerra
- John Roche as DeWitt

== See also ==
- List of early color feature films
- List of lost films
