= Ralph Barton =

American cartoonist and caricaturist (1891–1931)

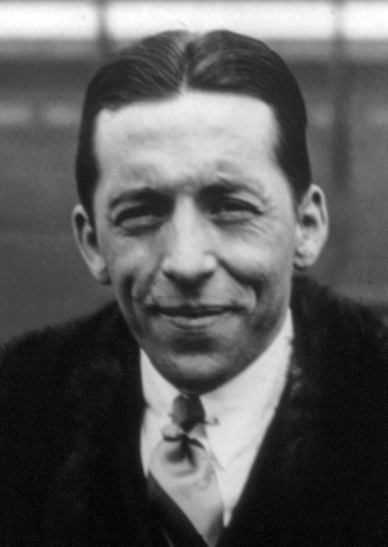
- Barton in 1926
- Born: Ralph Waldo Emerson Barton; August 14, 1891; Kansas City, Missouri
- Died: May 19, 1931 (aged 39); New York City, New York
- Occupations: Artist, cartoonist, caricaturist, illustrator
- Spouses: Marie Jennings; Anne Minnerly; Carlotta Monterey (m. 1923-1926); Germaine Tailleferre (m. 1926-1931)
- Children: 2

Ralph Waldo Emerson Barton (August 14, 1891 – May 19, 1931) was an American cartoonist and caricaturist of actors and other celebrities. His work was in heavy demand through the 1920s but was nearly forgotten soon after his death at 39.

== Early life ==
Barton was born in Kansas City, Missouri on August 14, 1891, the youngest of Abraham Pool and Catherine Josephine (Wigginton) Barton's four children. His father was an attorney by profession, but around the time of Ralph's birth made a career change to publish journals on metaphysics. His mother, an accomplished portrait painter, ran an art studio. The young Barton showed his mother's aptitude for art, and by the time he was in his mid-teens he had already seen several of his cartoons and illustrations published in The Kansas City Star and the Kansas City Journal-Post. Buoyed by this success, in 1908 Ralph Barton dropped out of Kansas City's Central High School before graduation. He moved to Chicago in 1909 to attend the Art Institute of Chicago, but soon found he didn't "like Chicago or Chicago people and worst of all the art institute. I could learn twice as much at work," he confided in a letter to his mother. Returning to Kansas City within a matter of months, Barton married Marie Jennings, his first wife.

== Career ==
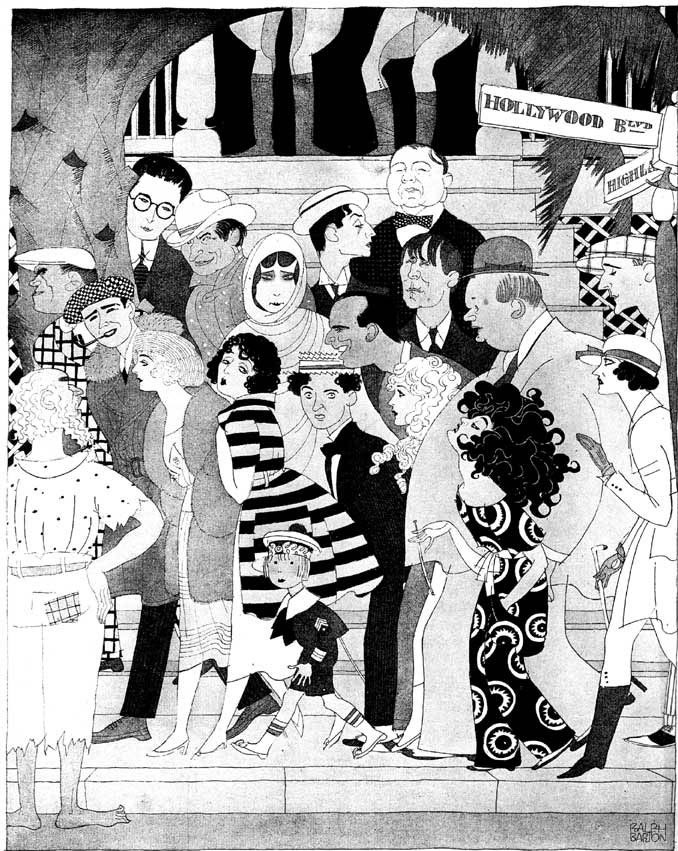
This 1922 Vanity Fair caricature by Ralph Barton shows the famous people who, he imagined, left work each day in Hollywood; use cursor to identify individual figures.

While back in Kansas City, Barton resumed his work for the Star and Journal-Post to support his wife and daughter, born in 1910. His first major break came in 1912 when Barton sold an illustration to the humor magazine Puck. Encouraged, the Bartons moved to New York City, where Ralph found steady work with Puck, McCall's and other publications. His wife was not happy with life there, however, and returned to Kansas City within a few months. Barton rented studio space in New York, which he shared with another famous Missouri artist, Thomas Hart Benton, and the two became fast friends. It was Benton, in fact, who served as the subject of Barton's first caricature.

In 1915, Puck magazine sent Barton to France to sketch scenes of World War I. It was then that Barton developed a great love of all things French, and throughout his life he would return to Paris to live for periods of time. In 1927, the French government awarded Barton the Legion of Honour.

Following Barton's caricature of Benton, he drew many of the most significant figures in New York's social and cultural scene of the time—including Henri Matisse, Pablo Picasso, Lillian Gish, Sigmund Freud, Aimee Semple McPherson, and Charlie Chaplin. Some of his most famous works were group drawings, and perhaps the most noted was a stage curtain created for a 1922 revue, depicting an "audience" of 139 faces looking back at the real theater-goers. "The effect was electrifying, and the applause was great," said another caricaturist of the era, Aline Fruhauf.

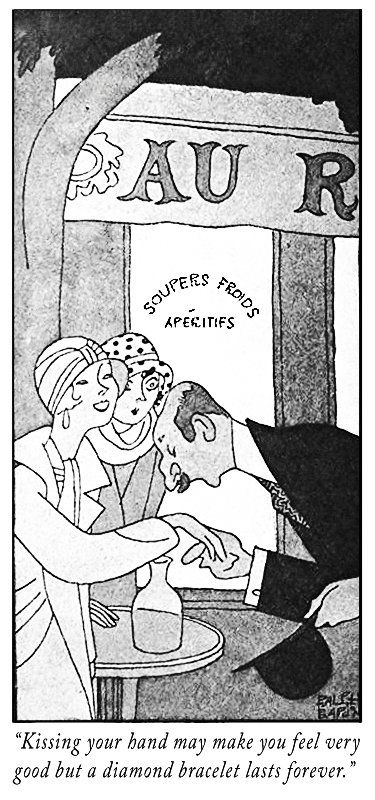
Gentlemen Prefer Blondes llustration by Barton

Much of Barton's work from the mid-1920s onward was for The New Yorker magazine, which he joined as an advisory editor from its very beginning in 1924. He would also be a stockholder in the publication. Other prominent magazines of the era to feature his work were Collier's, Photoplay, Vanity Fair, Judge, and Harper's Bazaar. While many would be published unsigned, there was no mistaking Barton's unique style. He illustrated books as well, including Anita Loos's hugely popular Gentlemen Prefer Blondes. With the urging of friend Charlie Chaplin, Barton also made one movie, Camille. The short film featured such notables as Paul Robeson, Ethel Barrymore, and Sinclair Lewis.

One of Barton's popular caricatures was "A Tuesday Night at the Cocoanut Grove in Los Angeles As Imagined by a Noted American Artist, Ralph Barton", which was published in the June 1927 issue of Vanity Fair. It pictured dozens of celebrity actors including Clara Bow, Buster Keaton, Charlie Chaplin, Greta Garbo, Mary Pickford and Louise Brooks. The illustration was later printed on fabric and turned into a dress.

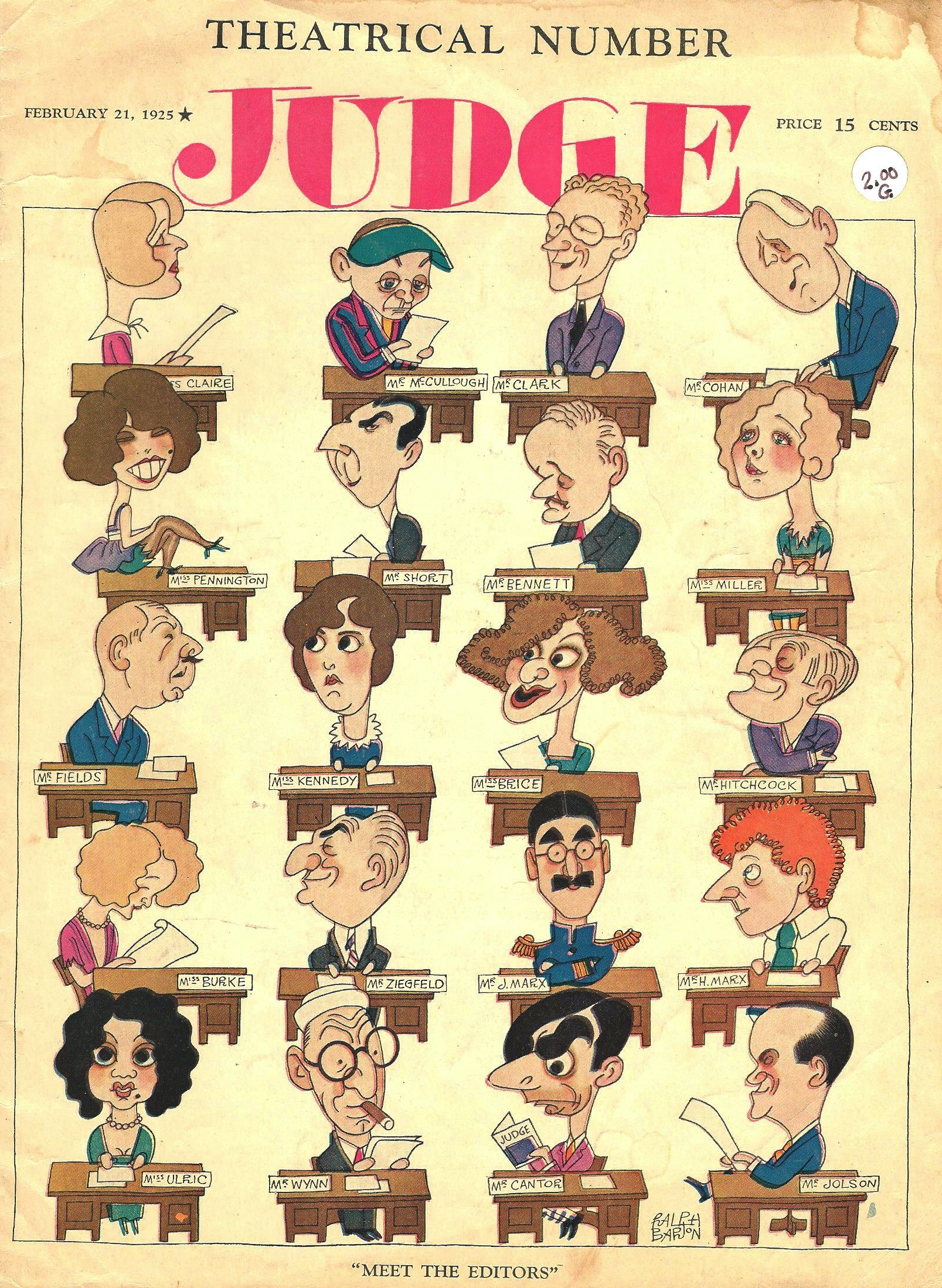
February 21, 1925 cover of Judge by Barton

At the height of his popularity, Barton enjoyed not only the acquaintance of the famous, but a solid and impressive income. All of this concealed a terribly unhappy life. He was beset by bipolar disorder. A self-portrait, painted around 1925 is inscribed "with apologies to Greco and God," and shows a drawn and unhappy figure. A year later he wrote, "The human soul would be a hideous object if it were possible to lay it bare."

== Personal life and death ==
Each of Barton's four marriages ended in divorce. His fourth wife was the French composer Germaine Tailleferre (1892–1983) who was a member of Les Six. They were married in Ridgefield, Connecticut on December 3, 1926, and she obtained a divorce on April 20, 1931.

On May 19, 1931, in his East Midtown Manhattan penthouse apartment, Barton shot himself through the right temple. He was 39 years old. His suicide note said he had irrevocably "lost the only woman I ever loved" (the actress Carlotta Monterey had divorced Barton in 1926 and married Eugene O'Neill in 1929), and that he feared his worsening bipolar disorder was approaching insanity. He wrote: "I have had few difficulties, many friends, great successes; I have gone from wife to wife and house to house, visited great countries of the world—but I am fed up with inventing devices to fill up twenty-four hours of the day." Almost immediately, his reputation diminished; several years after his death, a caricature of George Gershwin sold for a mere $5. Ralph Barton's ashes were returned to his native Kansas City and interred in Mount Moriah Cemetery.

== Legacy ==
Toward the end of the century, his work was included in several exhibitions at the National Portrait Gallery. A 1998 conference on cartooning at the Library of Congress also considered his work.

== Bibliography ==
=== Books ===
- G.P.P., ed. (1922). Nonsenseorship : sundry observations concerning prohibitions, inhibitions and illegalities. Illustrated by Ralph Barton. New York: G. P. Putnam's sons/The Knickerbocker Press.
- Loos, Anita (1925). "Gentlemen prefer blondes" : the illuminating diary of a professional lady. Intimately illustrated by Ralph Barton. New York: Boni & Liveright.
- — (1927). But gentlemen marry brunettes. Intimately illustrated by Ralph Barton. New York: Boni & Liveright.
- Shaw, Charles G. (1927). Heart in a hurricane. Illustrations by Ralph Barton. New York: Brentano's.
- Merkin, Richard (1968). The jazz age, as seen through the eyes of Ralph Barton, Miguel Covarrubias, and John Held, Jr. Providence, R.I.: Museum of Art, Rhode Island School of Design. Exhibition catalog.

=== Essays and reporting ===
- R. B. (March 7, 1925). "Black magic in West Forty-Fifth Street : Mr. James Rennie and Mr. Francis Corbie in "Cape Smoke" at the Martin Beck Theatre". The New Yorker. Vol. 1, no. 3. Illustrated by Ralph Barton. p. 10.
- Barton, Ralph (March 7, 1925). "La Ville Lumière". The New Yorker. Vol. 1, no. 3. Illustrated by Ralph Barton. p. 19.
- R. B. (March 14, 1925). "Ibsen done right by at last : great work by The Actors' Theatre in Forty-Eighth Street". The New Yorker. Vol. 1, no. 4. Illustrated by Ralph Barton. p. 12.
- — (March 21, 1925). "Idyllic moments from the current theatre : Miss Doris Keane and Mr. Leon Errol stub their several toes". The New Yorker. Vol. 1, no. 5. Illustrated by Ralph Barton. p. 15.
- — (March 28, 1925). "Glorifying the American guffaw : a new edition of the Follies that really is new". The Theatre. The New Yorker. Vol. 1, no. 6. Illustrated by Ralph Barton. p. 15.
- — (April 4, 1925). "The Actors' Theatre's third knock-out : bring your lunch and remain in your seats to see "The Wild Duck"". The Theatre. The New Yorker. Vol. 1, no. 7. Illustrated by Ralph Barton. p. 15.

=== Critical studies and reviews of Barton's work ===
- Bruce Kellner. The Last Dandy: Ralph Barton, American Artist, 1891-1931. Columbia: University of Missouri Press, 1991. ISBN 0-8262-0774-X
- John Updike. Just Looking: Essays on Art, Alfred A. Knopf, New York, 1989. ISBN 0-394-57904-6
