= Gentlemen Prefer Blondes (1928 film) =

1928 film

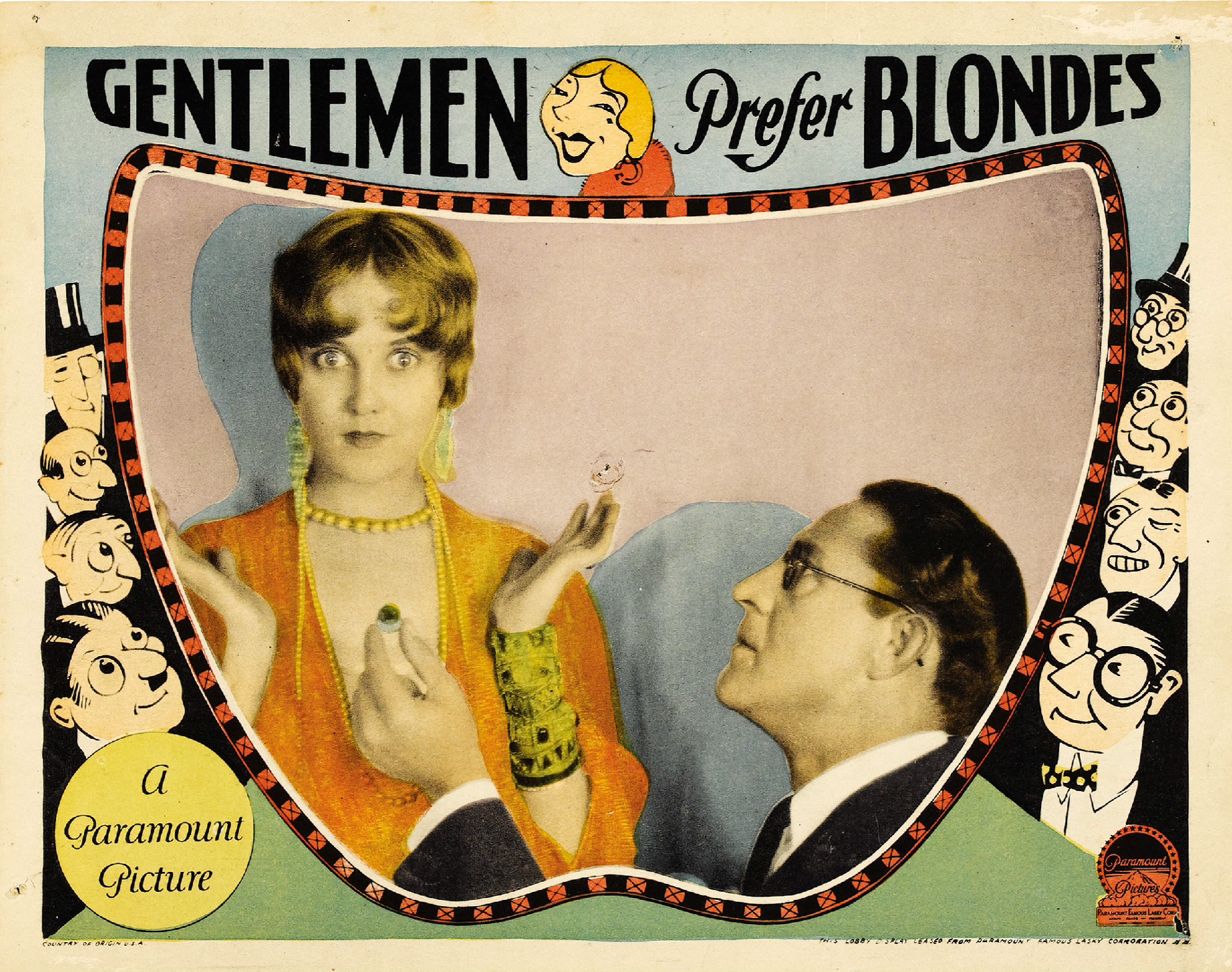
- 1928 lobby poster with Ruth Taylor and Holmes Herbert
- Directed by: Mal St. Clair
- Written by: Anita Loos and John Emerson (scenario); Anita Loos and Herman Mankiewicz (titles)
- Based on: Gentlemen Prefer Blondes; 1925 novella by Anita Loos Gentlemen Prefer Blondes; 1926 play by John Emerson
- Produced by: Adolph Zukor; Jesse L. Lasky
- Starring: Ruth Taylor; Alice White
- Cinematography: Harold Rosson
- Edited by: Jane Loring; William Shea
- Distributed by: Paramount Pictures
- Release date: January 18, 1928
- Running time: 75 minutes 7 reels (6,871 ft)
- Country: United States
- Language: Silent (English intertitles)

Gentlemen Prefer Blondes is a 1928 American silent comedy film directed by Mal St. Clair, co-written by Anita Loos based on her 1925 novel, and released by Paramount Pictures. No copies are known to exist, and it is now considered to be a lost film. The Broadway version Gentlemen Prefer Blondes starring Carol Channing as Lorelei Lee was mounted in 1949. It was remade into the film Gentlemen Prefer Blondes with Jane Russell as Dorothy Shaw and Marilyn Monroe as Lorelei Lee in 1953, directed by Howard Hawks.

== Plot ==
Blonde Lorelei Lee (Ruth Taylor) and her brunette friend Dorothy Shaw (Alice White), are each seeking a wealthy husband They learn that the richest man in the world, the bachelor Henry Spoffard, is boarding a luxury liner to Europe. The women purchase tickets for the same voyage. Spofford turns out not to be a licentious playboy, but a so-called social reformer intent on investigating immoral Americans abroad. Spoffard's seasickness en route prevents his seduction by either woman, but Lorelei obtains Lady Beekman's (Emily Fitzroy) diamond tiara from her love-struck husband Sir Francis Beekman (Mack Swain).

At the Ritz hotel in Paris, Spoffard and Lorelei begin a liaison that is repeatedly interrupted by his mother and fellow reformers. Love triumphs, and the couple are married, the ceremony broadcast on the radio.

== Cast ==
- Ruth Taylor as Lorelei Lee
- Alice White as Dorothy Shaw
- Ford Sterling as Gus Eisman
- Holmes Herbert as Henry Spoffard
- Mack Swain as Sir Francis Beekman
- Emily Fitzroy as Lady Beekman
- Trixie Friganza as Mrs. Spoffard
- Blanche Friderici as Miss Chapman
- Edward Faust as Robert
- Eugene Borden as Louis
- Margaret Seddon as Lorelei's Mother
- Luke Cosgrove as Lorelei's Grandfather
- Chester Conklin as Judge
- Yorke Sherwood as Mr. Jennings
- Mildred Boyd as Lulu

== Casting and Louise Brooks ==
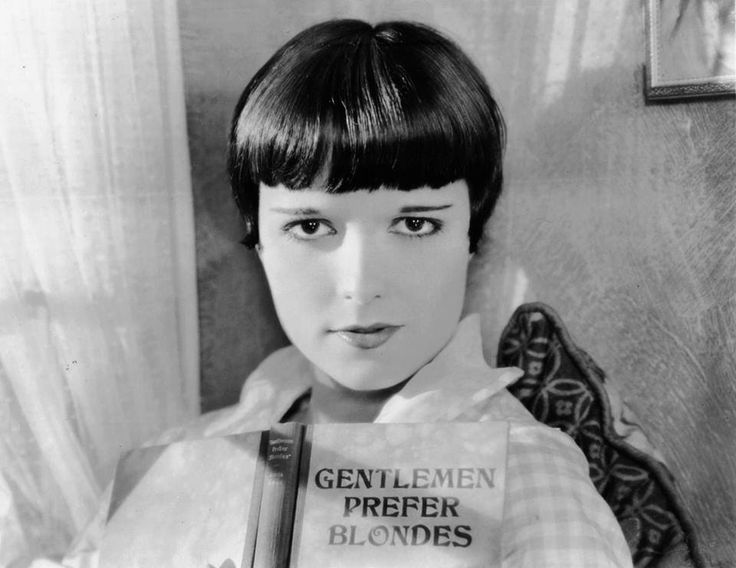
Louise Brooks 1927 publicity photo holding Anita Loos novel

St. Clair directed Louise Brooks in two films for Paramount before pre-production began on Gentlemen Prefer Blondes, each satiric comedies released in 1926: A Social Celebrity and The Show-Off. In both films she played the leading female protagonist. Brooks would also star in The Canary Murder Case (1929), also directed by St. Clair and her final film with Paramount.

Film historian Ruth Anne Dwyer, in her biography of Malcolm St. Clair, examines the circumstances concerning the casting for the lead role of Dorothy Shaw for the 1929 version of Gentlemen Prefer Blondes (note: Jane Russell was cast as Dorothy in the 1953 remake of the film directed by Howard Hawks).

The Anita Loos novel Gentleman Prefer Blondes (1925) inspired at least three popular spin-offs:

- A 1926 film entitled Just Another Blonde, directed by Alfred Santell for First National Pictures.
- Show Girl, a magazine serial created by J. P. McEvoy, featuring a character named Dixie Dugan, modeled on Dorothy Shaw.
- A cartoon strip entitled Dixie Dugan by John H. Striebel, with Dixie also a “Dorothy-like” figure.

Dwyer reports Dixie Dugan, “a cynical flapper,” were “thinly disguised” tributes to the actress Louise Brooks.

In the Santell production for Just Another Blonde, Brooks was cast as a “gold-digging show girl" similar to the fictional Dorothy Shaw. When First National made a film adaption of the magazine Show Girl in 1927, clearly based on Brooks’ screen persona in Just Another Blonde, Alice White was selected to play the role: Brooks, who expected to be cast, was not offered a screen test, though, according to her biographer Barry Paris she was “made" for the part. Brooks’ in anticipation of securing the role, posed for a photo depicting her reading a copy of Loos’ novel.

Both director Malcolm St. Clair and novelist Anita Loos screen-tested actors for the role of Dorothy Shaw in Gentlemen Prefer Blondes, including Louise Brooks, but settled on Antia White. According to Dwyer, Paris describes a bitterly disappointed Brooks, who subsequently denounced St. Clair as a drunkard and his direction of Paramount production of the film as a failure.

Film critic Beth Ann Gallagher reports that contemporary reviews of the film were “lukewarm,” and that the cast was ranked among critics higher than the production. Dwyer notes that the movie was “quite a success” with New York Times critic Mordaunt Hall, who described it as “splendid” and Alice White “an excellent selection” to perform the character Dorothy Shaw. Dwyer reports that St. Clair's professional and personal contemporaries she interviewed contradict and correct Brooks’ negative appraisal of the director.

== Reception ==
New York Times film critic Mordaunt Hall described the film as “a splendid pictorial translation of Anita Loos's book,” reserving high praise for the performances of Ruth Taylor, Alice White and Mack Swain. An “infectious treat,” Hall added that “St. Clair has given to it just the right touch.”

== See also ==
- List of lost films
