= Firecrackers (novel) =

1925 novel by Carl Van Vechten

- Cover of the first edition in 1925
- Author: Carl Van Vechten
- Language: English
- Genre: Novel
- Published: 1925 (Knopf)
- Publication place: United States
- Media type: Print (hardcover & paperback)
- Pages: 246
- LC Class: PS3543.A653
- Text: Firecrackers at Wikisource

Firecrackers, a Realistic Novel is a 1925 novel by American author Carl Van Vechten. It is one of several fictional works published that same year which assayed the temerity and hedonism of the Jazz Age including F. Scott Fitzgerald's The Great Gatsby and Anita Loos' Gentlemen Prefer Blondes.

Van Vechten dedicated this novel to his friend James Branch Cabell. The book is considered to be the fourth entry in a series about New York's "Upper Bohemians." Firecrackers chronicles the further adventures of characters—such as Paul Moody, Gareth Johns, Ella Nattatorrini, and Edith Dale—who appeared in Vechten's earlier works, The Blind Bow-Boy (1923) and The Tattooed Countess (1924).

== Synopsis ==
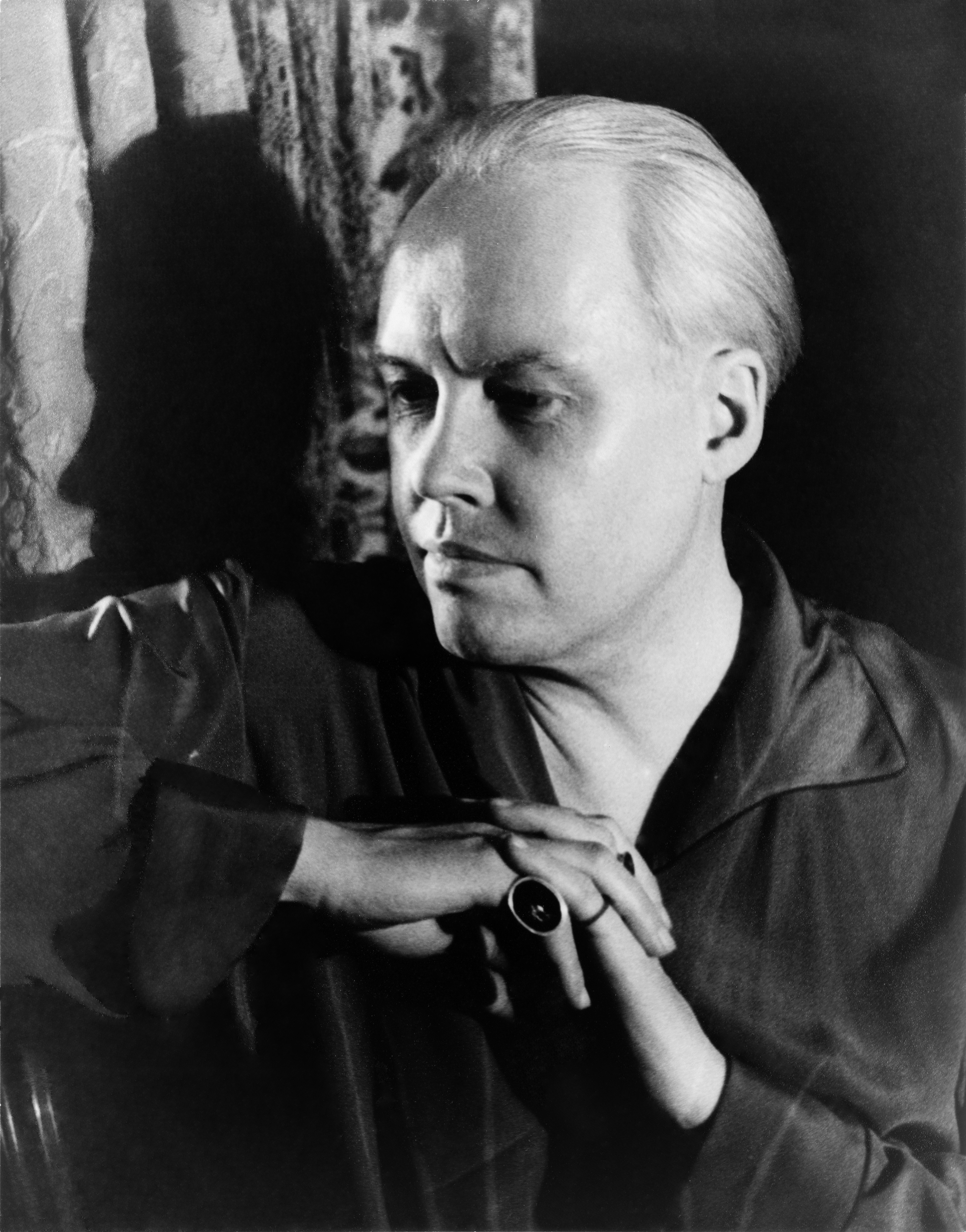
Carl Van Vechten

You must think of a group of people in terms of a packet of firecrackers. You ignite the first cracker and the flash fires the fuse of the second, and so on, until, after a series of crackling detonations, the whole bunch has exploded, and nothing survives but a few torn and scattered bits of paper, blackened with powder.

— Carl Van Vechten, Firecrackers

During 1924, a group of pleasure-seeking sophisticates are excited by a handsome and athletic newcomer to their social circle, Gunnar O'Grady, "a youth with the appearance of a Greek Adonis." Alternately seeking and avoiding their attentions, this enigmatic individual drifts through a series of menial vocations including furnace repairman, florist, waiter, and acrobat.

O'Grady becomes an object of sexual fascination to many within the circle, including a precocious young girl, a thrill-seeking wife, and a bored husband. Tensions escalate as various persons within the coterie vie for O'Grady's companionship, and O'Grady finds his own desires stymied.

== Reception ==
Writer F. Scott Fitzgerald praised the novel in his personal correspondence to Van Vechten. In a letter dated July 27, 1925, Fitzgerald wrote: "I like [Firecrackers] best of your four novels—It seems to me that this rather than The Tattooed Countess is your true line of genius. In [the character of] Campaspe, for example, you suggest so much more than you say—she is the embodiment of New York, mysterious and delicate and entirely original."

== Bibliography ==
- Fitzgerald, F. Scott (April 2003) [1945]. "Echoes of the Jazz Age". In Wilson, Edmund (ed.). The Crack-Up. New Directions. ISBN 978-0-8112-1820-7.
- Lueders, Edward (1965). Bowman, Sylvia E. (ed.). Carl Van Vechten. Twayne's United States Authors Series. New York: Twayne Publishers.
- "New York of 1924 in a New Van Vechten Novel". The New York Times. August 9, 1925. pp. 38–39.
- Van Vechten, Carl (1925). Firecrackers. A Realistic Novel. New York: Alfred A. Knopf.
