= Gentlemen Prefer Blondes (play) =

1926 play by Anita Loos and John Emerson

Gentleman Prefer Blondes is a 1926 play by Anita Loos and John Emerson, based upon Loos' 1925 international best-selling novel of the same name.

== History ==
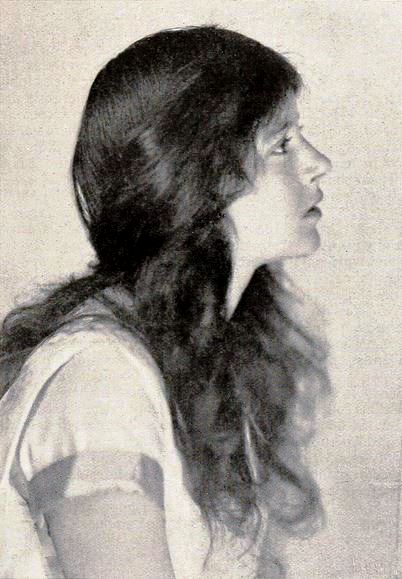
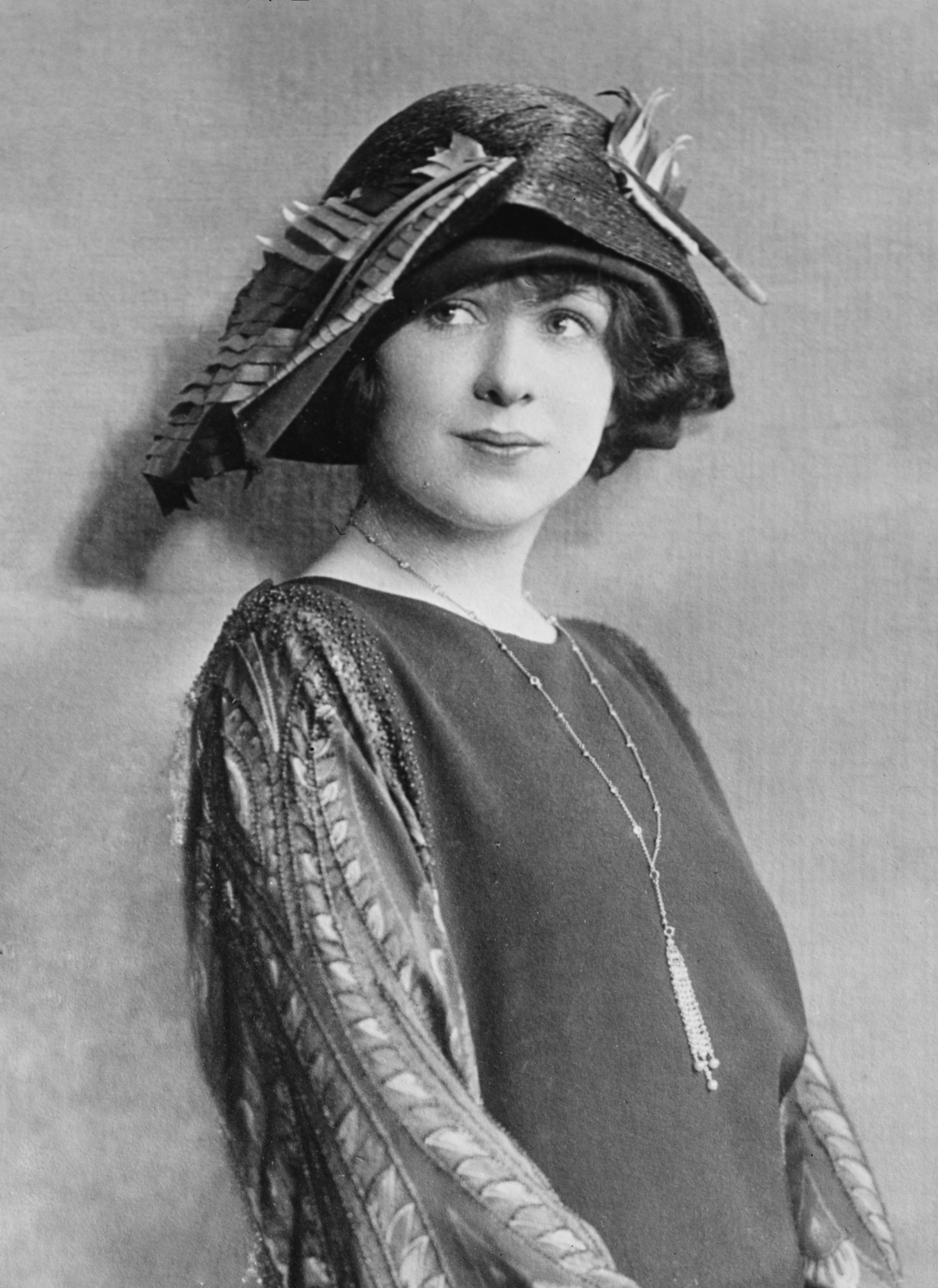
June Walker (left) portrayed Lorelei and Edna Hibbard (right) portrayed Dorothy in the 1926 play.

In 1925 Loos published the novel, Gentlemen Prefer Blondes: The Intimate Diary of a Professional Lady, a comic novel. By the end of the year, there was discussion that the novel would be made into a play. The play was produced by Edgar Selwyn. The play premiered in Detroit on April 28, 1926, at the Shubert-Detroit. It opened in Chicago on May 2, 1926, at the Selwyn Theatre, and was received positively by the Chicago Tribune. The play opened on Broadway at the Selwyn Theatre, on Tuesday, September 26, 1926, closing at Times Square Theatre.

== Cast ==
Broadway opening night cast:)

- Katherine Brook as Miss Chapman
- Grace Burgess as Lulu
- Grace Cornell as Ann Spoffard
- Roy Gorham as William Gwynn
- Grace Hampton as Lady Beekman
- William T. Hays as Old Spoffard
- Edna Hibbard as Dorothy Shaw
- Bruce Huntley as H. Gilbertson Montrose
- G.P. Huntley as Sir Francis Beekman
- Mrs. Jacques Martin as Mrs. Spoffard
- Frank Morgan as Henry Spoffard
- Edwina Prue as Dickie
- Vivian Purcell as Connie
- Ruth Raymonde as Gloria Atwell
- Georges Romain as Robert Broussard
- Adrian Rosely as Louis Broussard
- Arthur S. Ross as Gus Eisman
- Harold Thomas as Harry
- June Walker as Lorelei Lee
- Daniel Wolf as Leon

== Reception ==
The Daily News gave the play a positive review, although they felt it did not perform as well as they expected.
