= Ruth Taylor (actress) =

American actress (1905–1984)

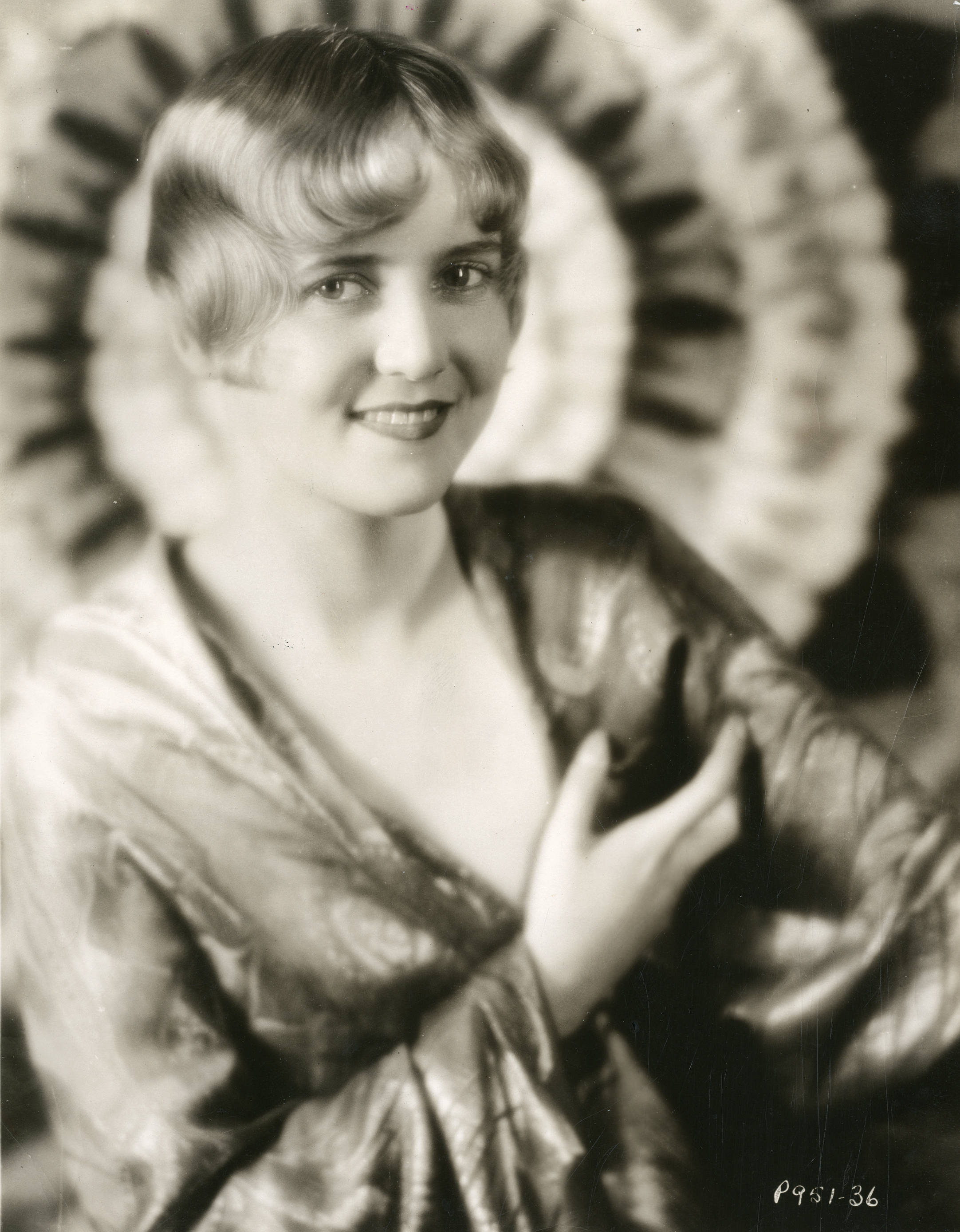
- Taylor in 1928
- Born: January 13, 1905; Grand Rapids, Michigan, U.S.
- Died: April 12, 1984 (aged 79); Palm Springs, California, U.S.
- Occupation: Actress
- Spouse: Paul Steinberg Zuckerman (m. 1930; died 1965)
- Children: Buck Henry

Ruth Alice Taylor (January 13, 1905 – April 12, 1984) was an American actress in silent films and early talkies. Her son was the writer, comic, and actor Buck Henry.

== Early years ==
Taylor was born to Norman and Ivah (née Bates) Taylor in Grand Rapids, Michigan. She was two years old when her parents moved to Portland, Oregon, where she was raised and graduated from high school.

== Film career ==
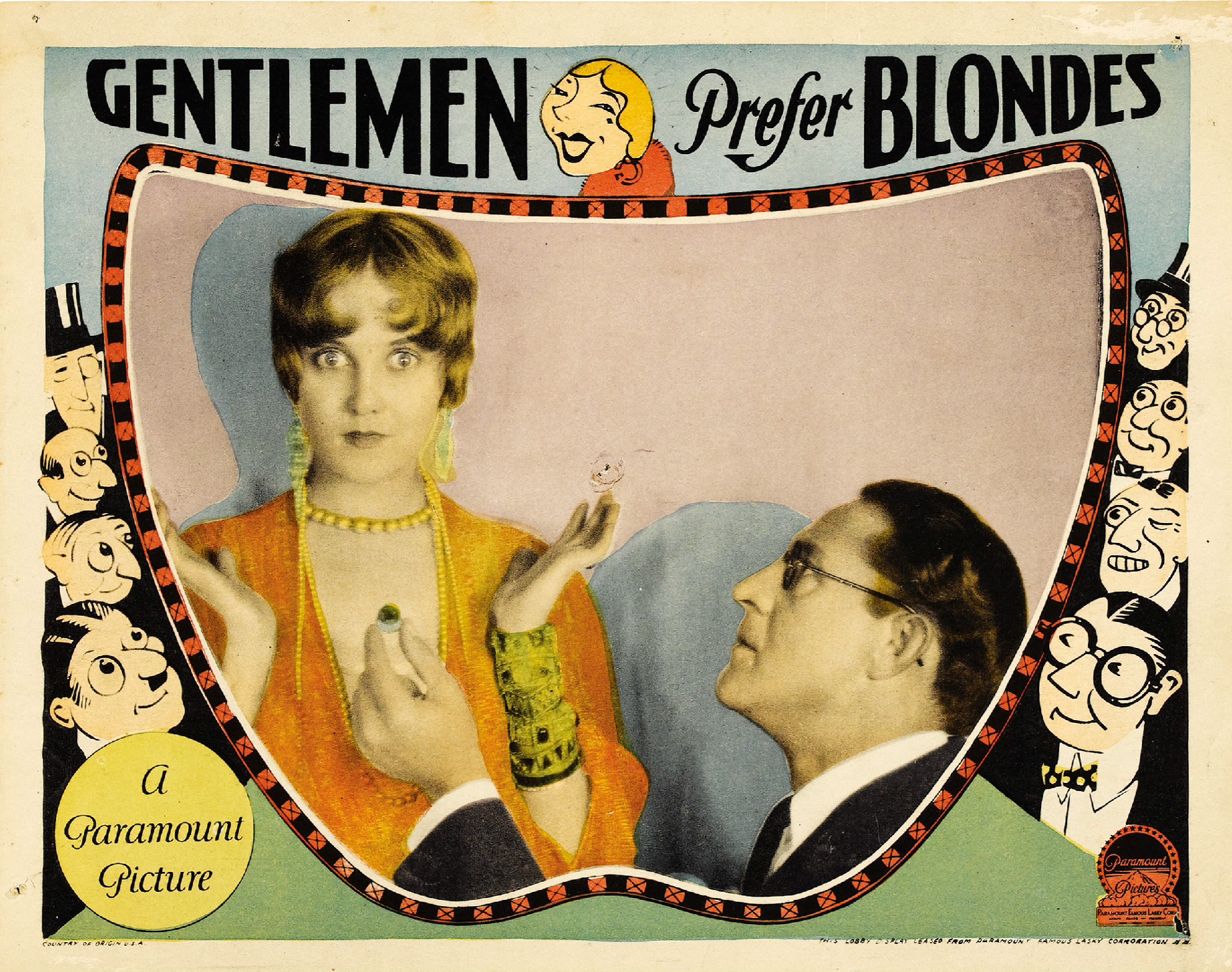
In 1928, Taylor starred as Lorelei Lee, the gold-digging blonde in Gentlemen Prefer Blondes

After participating in amateur dramatics as a youth, Taylor persuaded her mother to take her to Hollywood where the teenager spent a year working as an extra. She was discovered by Mack Sennett in February 1925 when he was looking for a blonde to play in a Harry Langdon comedy. She was chosen from around two hundred girls who responded to Sennett's call. She was also selected as one of the WAMPAS Baby Stars in 1928.

In 1927, Taylor's two-year contract with Mack Sennett expired. She was cast as Lorelei Lee in the original version of Gentlemen Prefer Blondes (1928). Directed by Malcolm St. Clair, the film co-starred Alice White and Ford Sterling.

During the search for Lorelei Lee, fans sent 14,000 letters to Paramount Pictures. Each suggested a choice of an actress for the role. In return, every fan was mailed a photo of Ruth Taylor when she was selected for the part. It was the largest shipment of pictures of one person ever sent out from Hollywood. Anita Loos was determined that Taylor play the role of her literary character. Just Married (1928) was the first offering in what was billed as a new comedy team featuring Taylor and James Hall. Produced by B.P. Schulberg, the movie was directed by Frank R. Strayer.

Taylor's final screen credits are roles in A Hint to Brides (1929), The College Coquette (1929), This Thing Called Love (1929), and Scrappily Married (1930).

== Personal life ==
Taylor married retired USAF Brigadier General and New York City stockbroker, Paul Steinberg Zuckerman on March 17, 1930. He had served in the Lafayette Escadrille during World War I, and as a senior officer in World War II. They were married until his death on December 3, 1965. Their son, Buck Henry, went on to become a comedian and screenwriter of such hits as The Graduate.

== Death ==
Ruth Taylor died on April 12, 1984 in Palm Springs, California in 1984, aged 79.

== Partial filmography ==
- Butter Fingers (1925)
- Flirty Four-Flushers (1926)
- Gentlemen Prefer Blondes (1928)
- Just Married (1928)
- This Thing Called Love (1929)
- The College Coquette (1929)
