= But Gentlemen Marry Brunettes =

1927 novel by Anita Loos

But Gentlemen Marry Brunettes: The Illuminating Diary of a Professional Lady
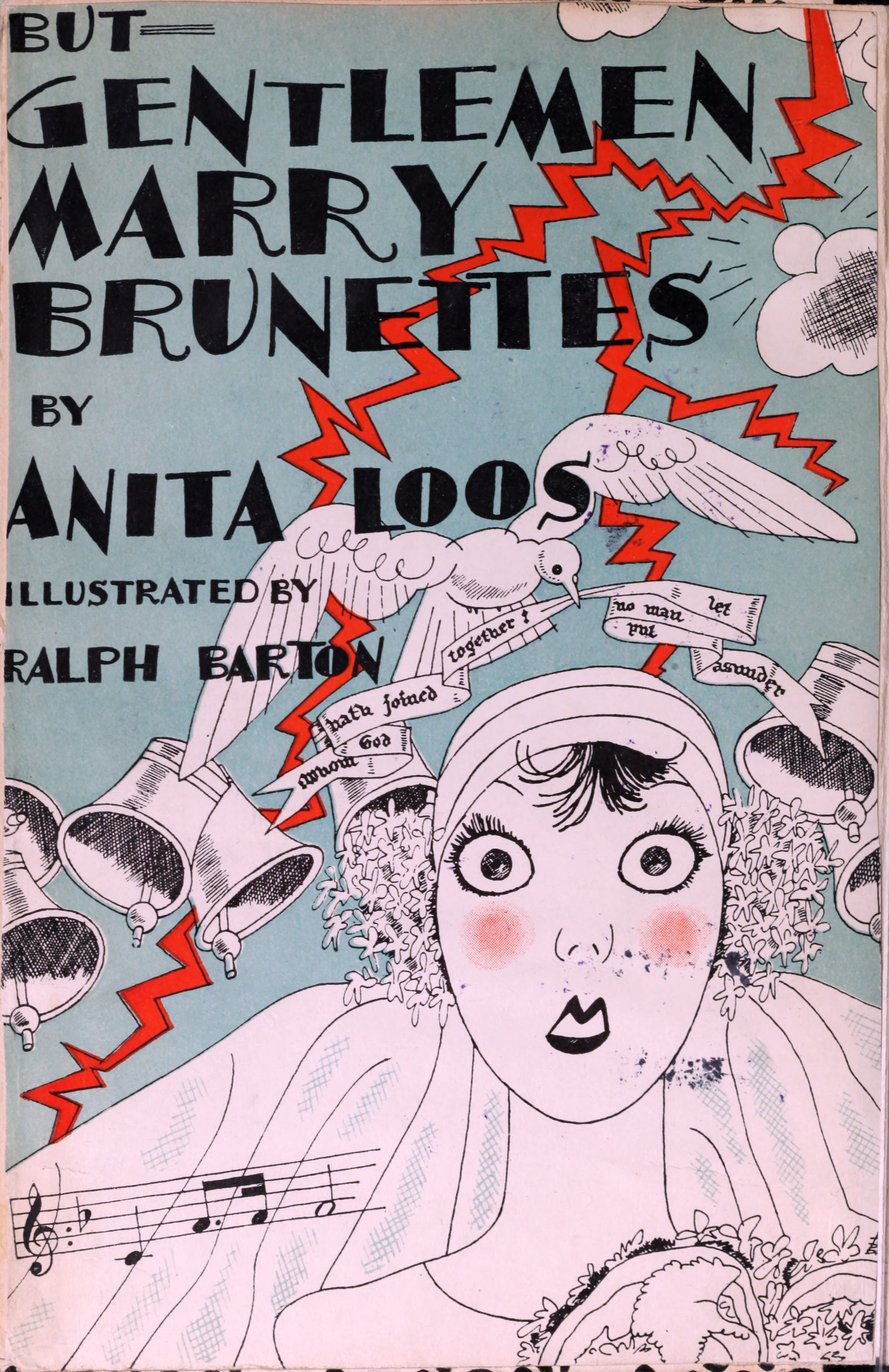
- Cover of the first edition
- Author: Anita Loos
- Illustrator: Ralph Barton
- Cover artist: Ralph Barton
- Language: English
- Series: Lorelei Lee
- Genre: Comedic novel
- Publisher: Harper's Bazaar; Boni & Liveright
- Publication date: 1927
- Publication place: United States
- Media type: Print (hardcover & paperback)
- ISBN: 0-14-018488-0
- Preceded by: Gentlemen Prefer Blondes

But Gentlemen Marry Brunettes is a 1927 novel written by Anita Loos. It is the sequel to her 1925 novel Gentlemen Prefer Blondes. The plot follows the further adventures of Lorelei Lee and Dorothy Shaw and is illustrated by Ralph Barton.

As a sequel to the 1953 film Gentlemen Prefer Blondes, the 1955 film Gentlemen Marry Brunettes used only the book's name and starred Jane Russell and Jeanne Crain as sisters.

== Publication ==
Originally published in 1927, But Gentlemen Marry Brunettes is the sequel to Anita Loos' Gentlemen Prefer Blondes. Both books began as sketch series originally published in Harper's Bazaar magazine.

Loos had planned on retiring after writing Gentlemen Prefer Blondes in order to care for her partner, John Emerson. However, she had promised Harper's Bazaar a sequel, so Loos and Emerson did not leave for Europe until shortly after the sequel had been published.

== Plot summary ==
The sequel to Gentlemen Prefer Blondes is also narrated by Lorelei, the bubbly blonde; however, she tells the tale of her friend, Dorothy, a bright talented young woman who grew up in a carnival company; she is discovered by Charlie, who helps her find her way to New York City as a young woman. In New York she is introduced to a broker who is to introduce her to Florenz Ziegfeld Jr., so that she might have a chance at becoming one of the Ziegfeld Follies. The broker is thrown off by Dorothy's unique style and personality and does little to refer her to Mr. Ziegfeld. Dorothy takes matters into her own hands and waits outside Mr. Ziegfeld's office and lands the position without any help. Dorothy marries Lester, a saxophone player from the Follies; she soon finds that marriage is not everything she wanted it to be...

It is the bright ideas that keep home fires burning and prevent a divorce from taking the bloom off a romance.

— Anita Loos, 1927

== Major characters ==
- Dorothy — Protagonist, an eccentric young woman with much talent, wit and independence.
- Charlie — Discovered Dorothy when she was in a reform school after leaving the circus. Dorothy's second husband.
- Mr. Ziegfeld — The founder of the famous Ziegfeld Follies, gives Dorothy a job.
- Lester — Saxophone player, marries Dorothy
- Gloria — Dorothy's friend
- Jerry — Violent background, hired to kill Lester
- Claude — Dorothy's new lover

== Critical analysis ==
Both Gentlemen Prefer Blondes and But Gentlemen Marry Brunettes were viewed by female scholars as celebration bordering on satire. It is often considered that Gentlemen Marry Brunettes is the weaker of the two and only works as a companion piece to Loos' first installment.

== Film adaptation ==
The film based on the novel, Gentlemen Marry Brunettes (1955), is very loosely based on Loos' book. The plot is very different. Gentlemen Marry Brunettes is a musical film made by Russ-Field productions, starring Jane Russell and Jeanne Crain, and released by United Artists. The film was directed by Richard Sale, produced by the director and Bob Waterfield (Russell's husband) with Robert Bassler as executive producer, from a screenplay by Mary Loos and Sale, based on the novel But Gentlemen Marry Brunettes by Anita Loos.

Anita Loos was the author of the novel and play Gentlemen Prefer Blondes which had been turned into a smash film with Jane Russell and Marilyn Monroe in 1953. This film was not as well received as the earlier one. Anita Loos had entitled her book But Gentlemen Marry Brunettes, but the studio dropped the first word from the title for the film.
