= Edna Hibbard =

American actress

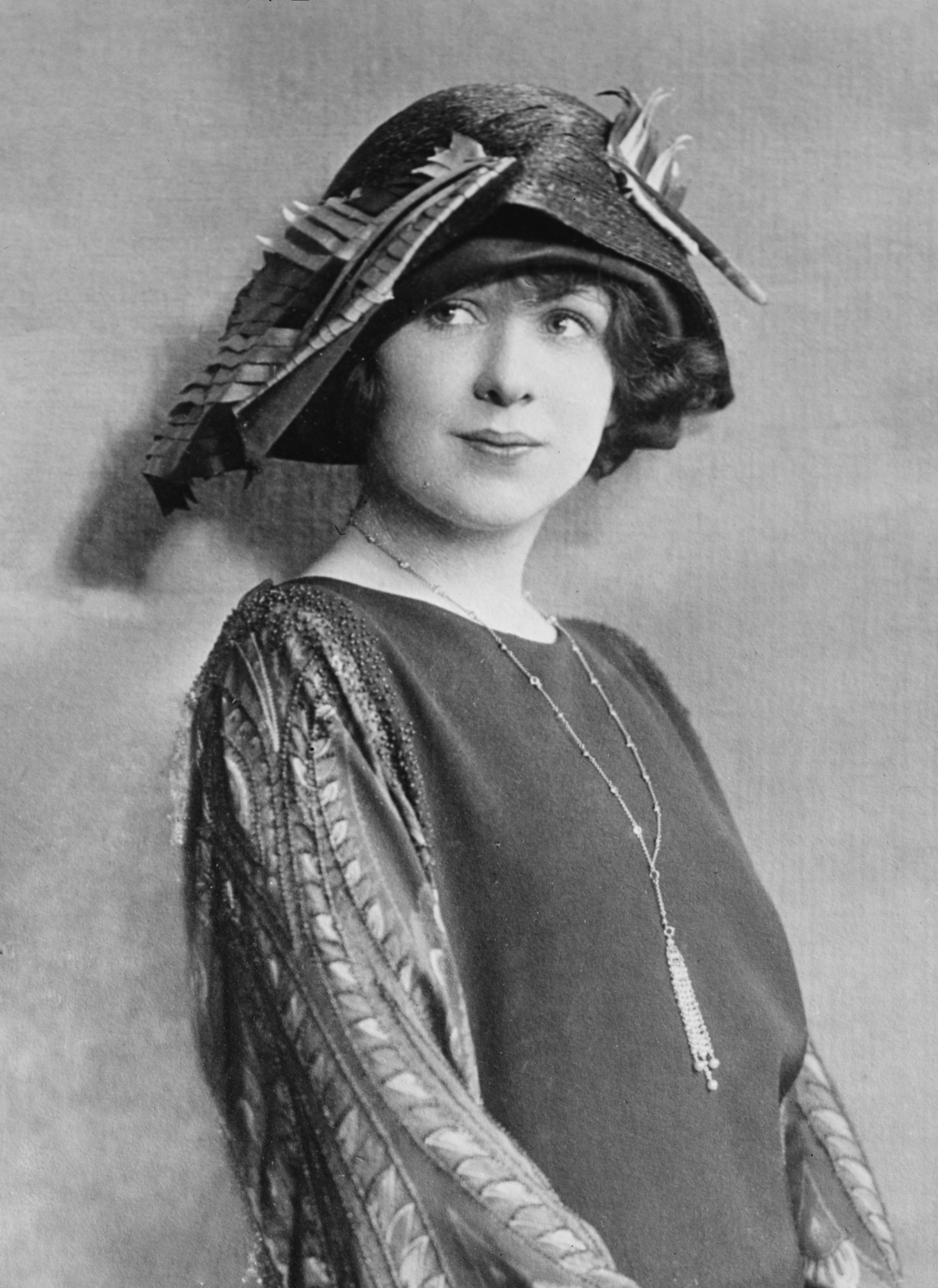
- Born: May 12, 1894; Detroit, Michigan, U.S.
- Died: December 26, 1942 (aged 48); New York City, U.S.
- Occupation(s): Stage and film actress
- Years active: 1915–1922 (film)
- Spouses: John C. Seager, Jr.; Stuart Gage; Philip Dunning; James Dunne; Lester Bryant

Edna Louise Hibbard (May 12, 1894 – December 26, 1942) was a stage and motion picture actress from Detroit, Michigan. She had a sharp tongue and was known for her roles in comedy.

== Theatrical prominence ==
She made her stage debut in Milwaukee, Wisconsin, in 1907 as the child in The Kreutzer Sonata. Hibbard trained with the Poli Stock Company in Hartford, Connecticut, and Washington, D.C. Soon she performed in Officer 666, Ready Money, and Stop Thief. She spent a year in vaudeville with Lynne Overman in a rendition of The Highest Bidder.

Hibbard first came to theatrical prominence as the ingenue lead in Rock-a-Bye Baby in 1918. The play was staged at the Rialto Theater in New York City with the ingenue role being the primary part in the cast. She graduated from drama school in New York before being sent to train under the Selwyns. The New York Times described Hibbard as a combination of Madge Kennedy and Marguerite Clark in appearance.

One of her best-received roles was chorus girl Dot Miller in Ladies of the Evening, performed at the Lyceum Theater in 1924. Two years later, she gained critical acclaim as the brunette partner of Lorelei Lee in Gentlemen Prefer Blondes. She made her London debut in the same part in 1928. Hibbard played the role of Ethel Brooks at the Belasco Theater in September 1929 in a production of The Door Between. Her final Broadway appearance was in December 1932 at the Belasco Theater. She played Lulu Corliss in Anybody's Game.

== Marriage and death ==
Edna Hibbard was married to Lester Bryant at the time of her death. Earlier marriages were to John C. Seager, Jr., Treasurer of the Seager Steamship Company; Stuart Gage; playwright Philip Dunning, and James Dunne, who served as a private in France in World War I. On October 9, 1918, Edna gave birth to a son, David, who was placed for adoption. She died in 1942 at Mother Cabrini Hospital, 611 Edgecombe Avenue, New York City, at the age of 48.

== Partial filmography ==
- The Fight (1915)
- The Apaches of Paris (1915)
- The Weavers of Life (1917)
- Island Wives (1922)

== Sources ==
- "Who Is Edna Hibbard?" (PDF). The New York Times. June 2, 1918. p. 51.
- "J.C. Seager Jr. Weds Edna Hibbard" (PDF). The New York Times. November 24, 1922. p. 23.
- "Noted Actress Returns in Comedy". The New York Times. September 6, 1929. p. A9.
- "Edna Hibbard, 47, Actress, Is Dead". The New York Times. December 27, 1942. p. 34.
