= Gentlemen Prefer Blondes (1953 film) =

1953 musical comedy film by Howard Hawks

- Theatrical release poster
- Directed by: Howard Hawks
- Screenplay by: Charles Lederer
- Based on: Gentlemen Prefer Blondes; 1949 musical by Anita Loos; Joseph Fields
- Produced by: Sol C. Siegel
- Starring: Jane Russell; Marilyn Monroe
- Cinematography: Harry J. Wild
- Edited by: Hugh S. Fowler
- Music by: Eliot Daniel; Lionel Newman; Songs: Jule Styne (music); Leo Robin (lyrics); Hoagy Carmichael (music); Harold Adamson (lyrics)
- Distributed by: 20th Century-Fox
- Release dates: July 1, 1953 (Atlantic City); July 15, 1953 (New York)
- Running time: 91 minutes
- Country: United States
- Languages: English; French
- Budget: $2.3 million or $2.7 million
- Box office: $5.3 million

Gentlemen Prefer Blondes is a 1953 American musical comedy film directed by Howard Hawks and written by Charles Lederer. The film is based on the 1949 stage musical of the same name, which in turn is based on the 1925 novel of the same name by Anita Loos. The film stars Jane Russell and Marilyn Monroe, with Charles Coburn, Elliott Reid, Tommy Noonan, George Winslow, Taylor Holmes and Norma Varden in supporting roles.

The film is filled with comedic situations and musical numbers, choreographed by Jack Cole, while the music was written (among others) by Hoagy Carmichael, Harold Adamson, Jule Styne and Leo Robin. The songs by Styne and Robin are from the Broadway show, while the songs by Carmichael and Adamson were written especially for the film.

Monroe's rendition of "Diamonds Are a Girl's Best Friend" and her pink dress are part of popular culture and are considered iconic; the performance has inspired and been recreated by various artists as an homage.

== Plot ==
Lorelei Lee and Dorothy Shaw are American showgirls and best friends, although the two are very different. Lorelei thinks more of a man's financial wealth, especially men who can give her diamonds, such as her fiancé Gus Esmond Jr. Contrarily, Dorothy prefers men who are attractive and fit, and she does not care about their wealth.

Lorelei plans to wed Gus in France, but they are forbidden to travel together by Gus's strict father Esmond Sr., who despises Lorelei as a fortune hunter, although he hasn't met her. Lorelei decides to travel to France with or without Gus; before she leaves, he gives her a letter of credit to cover expenses, promising to meet her in France. He also warns her to behave, noting that his father will prohibit their marriage if Esmond Sr. hears rumors of misdeeds. Gus and Lorelei are unaware that Esmond Sr. has hired private detective Ernie Malone to spy on Lorelei.

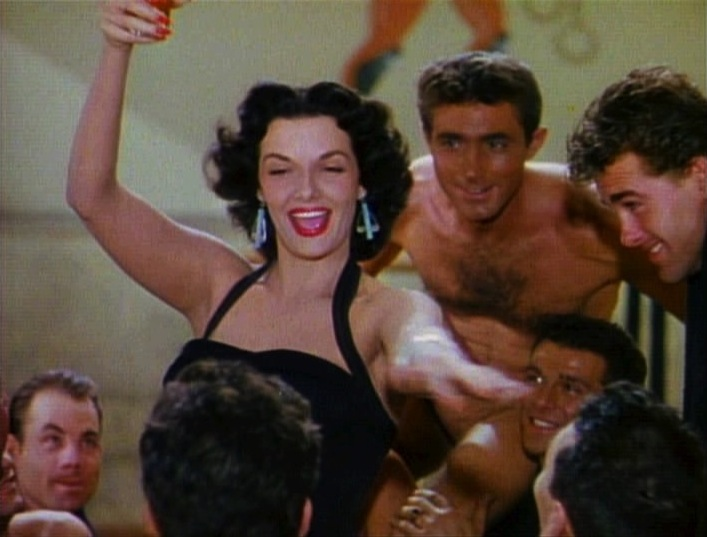
Jane Russell as Dorothy Shaw

During the Atlantic crossing, Malone immediately falls in love with Dorothy, but she initially is drawn to the members of the male US Olympic team who are also on the ship. Lorelei meets the rich and foolish Sir Francis "Piggy" Beekman, owner of a diamond mine, attracted by his wealth. Although Piggy is married, Lorelei returns his geriatric flirtations, which annoys his wife, Lady Beekman.

Lorelei invites Piggy to the cabin that she shares with Dorothy, where he recounts his travels to Africa, imitating a python as an excuse to embrace her. Spying through the window, Malone takes pictures of the embrace, but Dorothy sees him as he walks away. To protect Lorelei's, reputation, they devise a scheme to intoxicate Malone and search him to recover the incriminating film while he is unconscious. They find the film in his pants, and Lorelei prints and hides the negatives. Telling Piggy that she retrieved the film to protect his reputation, Lorelei persuades an intimidated Piggy to give her Lady Beekman's tiara as a reward. Having planted a recording device in Lorelei's cabin, Malone hears her discussion with Piggy about the pictures and the tiara. Malone confesses to Dorothy that he is a private detective, accusing Lorelei of being a gold digger, but Dorothy scolds him for his actions. Dorothy reveals to Lorelei that she is falling for Malone, and Lorelei chastises her for choosing a poor man when she could easily have a rich one.

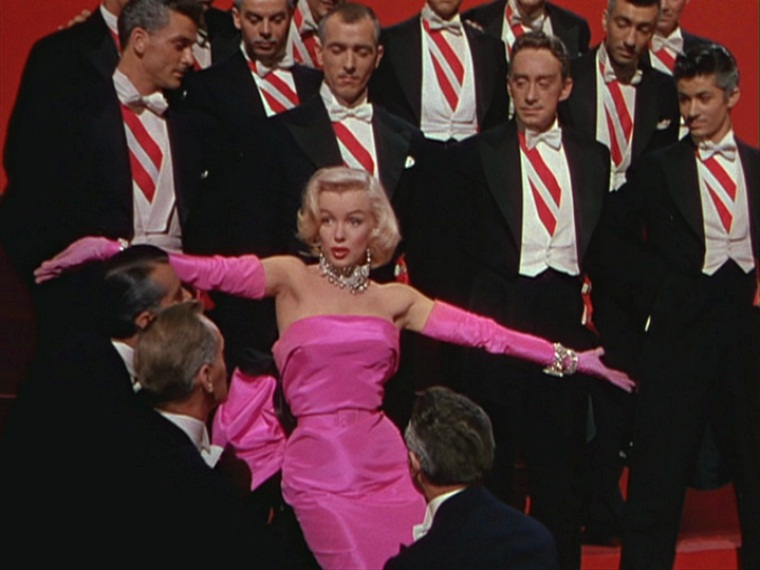
Marilyn Monroe as Lorelei Lee performing "Diamonds Are a Girl's Best Friend". On the right is George Chakiris (uncredited).

The ship arrives in France, and Lorelei and Dorothy go on a shopping spree. However, they discover Malone's report to Esmond Sr. has resulted in Lorelei's letter of credit being canceled and their eviction from their hotel. They find work as showgirls in Paris, headlining a lavish revue. When Gus appears at their show, Lorelei rebuffs him prior to going onstage to perform "Diamonds Are a Girl's Best Friend". Meanwhile, Lady Beekman has filed charges regarding her missing tiara, and Lorelei is accused of theft. Dorothy persuades Lorelei to return the tiara, but they discover it is missing from her jewelry box. When Malone catches Piggy at the airport, Piggy tries to deny his part in the affair.

Dorothy stalls for time by pretending to be Lorelei, getting arrested in her place while disguised in a blonde wig and mimicking her friend's breathy voice and mannerisms in court. When Malone appears in court and is about to unmask Dorothy, she reveals to Malone in covert language that she loves him but would never forgive him if he hurts Lorelei. Malone refrains from exposing Dorothy's impersonation, but then reveals that Piggy has the tiara, exonerating Lorelei.

Back at the nightclub, Lorelei impresses Esmond Sr. with a speech reasoning that a woman marrying a rich man is like a man marrying a pretty woman; it isn't the only consideration, but a desirable one. She reasons to Esmond Sr. that if he had a daughter instead of a son, he would want the best for her. He acknowledges her common sense and consents to the marriage. A double wedding is held for Lorelei and Dorothy and their grooms.

== Cast ==
- Jane Russell as Dorothy Shaw
- Marilyn Monroe as Lorelei Lee
- Charles Coburn as Sir Francis "Piggy" Beekman
- Elliott Reid as Ernie Malone
- Tommy Noonan as Gus Esmond Jr.
- George Winslow as Henry Spofford III
- Marcel Dalio as the magistrate
- Taylor Holmes as Mr. Esmond Sr.
- Norma Varden as Lady Beekman
- Howard Wendell as Watson
- Steven Geray as the hotel manager
- Henri Letondal as Grotier (uncredited)
- Noel Neill as passenger (uncredited)
- Jean Del Val as Ship's Captain (uncredited)
- George Chakiris as Man in "Diamonds" song pursuing Lorelei (uncredited)

== Production ==
Director Howard Hawks had never before made a musical film, but he owed Fox one more film, so he agreed. The stage musical, starring Carol Channing, had already been running for two years on Broadway when Fox paid $250,000 for the film rights. The original intention was a vehicle for Betty Grable and Ginger Rogers; however, after the success of Monroe's appearance in Niagara (1953), the studio believed it had a more potent, and less expensive, sex symbol than Grable.

Although Hawks is credited as the sole director of the film, Russell and assistant choreographer Gwen Verdon contend that all musical numbers were actually staged by Jack Cole. Russell said, "Howard Hawks had nothing to do with the musical numbers. He was not even there." Hawks later confirmed this in an interview with author Joseph McBride: "I did a musical called Gentlemen Prefer Blondes, and I didn't do the production numbers. I didn't have any desire to."

An uncredited George Chakiris, future Oscar winner for Best Supporting Actor (as Bernardo in West Side Story, 1961 version), can be glimpsed as one of the wealthy men pursuing Marilyn in "Diamonds Are a Girl's Best Friend". Two other uncredited "suitors" in this musical number are Larry Kert and Matt Mattox.

According to Monroe's last interview before her death, she was paid her usual contract salary of $500 a week, for a total of $18,000, while Russell, the better-known actress at the time, earned $200,000. (Note: Jane Russell was still under contract to Howard Hughes at the time, fresh from her roles in films like The Outlaw (1943), His Kind of Woman (1951) and The Las Vegas Story (1952).)

== Release ==
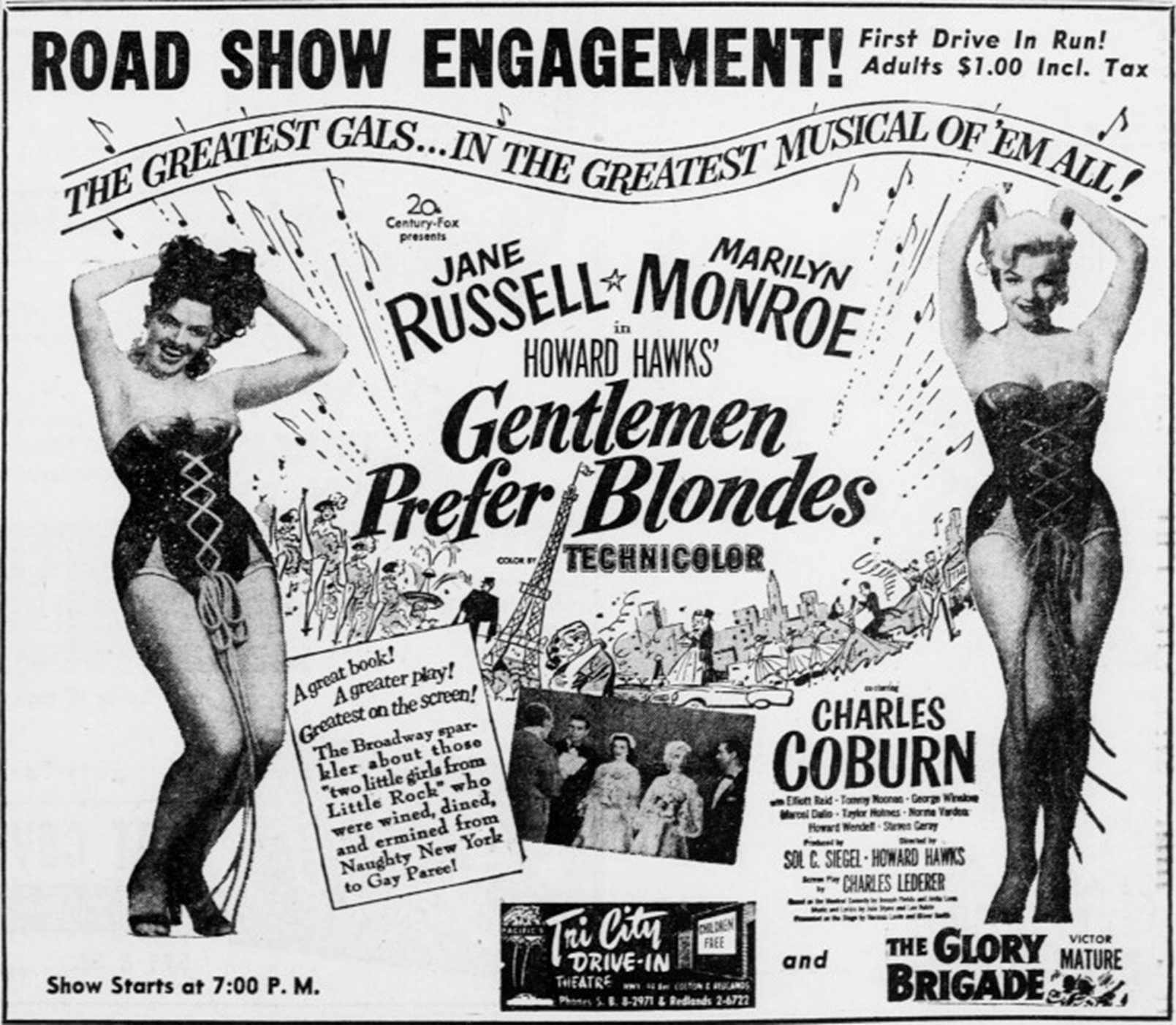
Drive-in advertisement from 1953

=== Box office ===
The film earned $5.3 million at the box office worldwide, and was the seventh-highest-grossing film of the year, with $5.1 million in North America, (Note: Another account in Variety said the film earned $4.8 million domestically.) while Monroe's next feature, How to Marry a Millionaire (also 1953), was the fourth-highest.

=== Critical reception ===
The film received positive reviews from critics. Monroe and Russell were both praised for their performances even by reviewers who panned the film.

Bosley Crowther of The New York Times called Howard Hawks' direction "uncomfortably cloddish and slow" and found the gags for Russell "devoid of character or charm," but concluded, "And yet, there is that about Miss Russell and also about Miss Monroe that keeps you looking at them even when they have little or nothing to do."

Variety wrote that Hawks "maintains a racy air that brings the musical off excellently at a pace that helps cloak the fact that it's rather lightweight, but sexy, stuff. However, not much more is needed when patrons can look at Russell-Monroe lines as displayed in slick costumes and Technicolor."

Harrison's Reports wrote: "Both Jane Russell and Marilyn Monroe are nothing short of sensational in the leading roles. They not only act well, but the sexy manner in which they display their song, dance and pulchritude values just about sets the screen on fire and certainly is crowd-pleasing, judging by the thunderous applause at the preview after each of the well-staged musical numbers."

John McCarten of The New Yorker wrote that the two leads "have a good deal of enthusiasm, and occasionally their exuberance offsets the tedium of one long series of variations on the sort of anatomical joke that used to amuse the customers of Minsky so inordinately."

Britain's Monthly Film Bulletin praised Jane Russell for her "enjoyable Dorothy, full of gusto and good nature," but thought that the film had been compromised from the play "by the casting of Marilyn Monroe, by the abandonment of the 20s period and the incongruous up-to-date streamlining, by inflating some bright, witty songs into lavish production numbers, and by tamely ending the whole thing by letting two true loves conventionally come true. There is too, a lack of grasp in Howard Hawks' handling, which is scrappy and uninventive."

On review-aggregation website Rotten Tomatoes, the film has an approval rating of 88% based on 88 reviews, with an average rating of 7.8/10. Its site's critical consensus reads, "Anchored by Marilyn Monroe and Jane Russell's sparkling magnetism, Gentlemen Prefer Blondes is a delightfully entertaining 1950s musical."

German film director Rainer Werner Fassbinder declared the film one of the ten best ever.

Recent reviews have noted that the film is groundbreaking for its depiction of female friendships and agency for women. Writing for Bust magazine, Samantha Mann wrote, "Throughout the entire film, the main characters Lorelei (Marilyn Monroe) and Dorothy (Jane Russell) display consistent loyalty to one another. There is no back-stabbing, shit-talking, or degrading one another to come out on top or gain the affection of a man. The women remain steadfast in their loyalty to one another, and tolerate no one speaking ill of the other. Providing support and comfort to one another takes priority over finding ways to secure their desired men." Caroline Siede of The A.V. Club wrote the story may appear to be a "90-minute misogynistic punchline about the desperate schemes of two devious social-climbing showgirls, ditzy Lorelei Lee (Monroe) and witty man-eater Dorothy Shaw (Jane Russell). Thankfully, Gentlemen Prefer Blondes is quite the opposite. It's a cheeky social satire about gender and class that doubles as a celebration of female ingenuity and solidarity, all glammed up in a ballgown and diamonds."

=== Accolades ===
Monroe and Russell left their handprints and footprints in cement in the forecourt of Grauman's Chinese Theatre in a spectacle that generated a great deal of publicity for the actresses and the film.

Date of ceremony	Award	Category	Recipients	Result
February 25, 1954	Writers Guild of America Awards	Best Written Musical	Charles Lederer	Nominated
March 8, 1954	Photoplay Gold Medal Awards	Gold Medal Actress	Marilyn Monroe	Won (Note: Also for her performance in How to Marry a Millionaire)

== See also ==
- Gentlemen Marry Brunettes, a 1955 musical film based on the 1927 novel But Gentlemen Marry Brunettes starring Russell and Jeanne Crain but playing completely new characters
