= The Mystery of the Leaping Fish =

1916 silent short film by John Emerson, Christy Cabanne

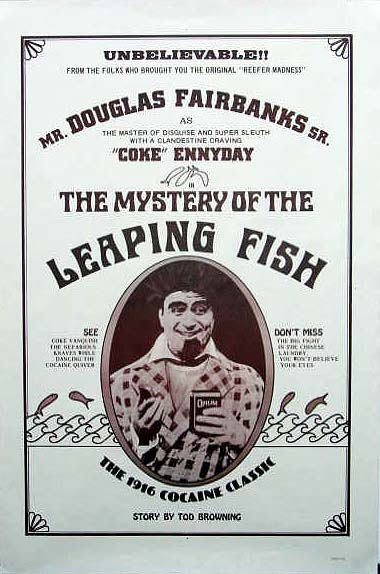
- Reissue theatrical poster
- Directed by: John Emerson; Christy Cabanne
- Written by: Anita Loos (intertitles)
- Story by: Tod Browning
- Starring: Douglas Fairbanks; Bessie Love; Alma Rubens
- Cinematography: John W. Leezer
- Distributed by: Triangle Film Corporation
- Release date: June 11, 1916 (U.S.)
- Running time: 25 minutes; 2 reels
- Country: United States
- Language: Silent (English intertitles)

The Mystery of the Leaping Fish is a 1916 American short silent comedy film starring Douglas Fairbanks, Bessie Love, and Alma Rubens. Directed by John Emerson, the story was written by Tod Browning with intertitles by Anita Loos. A parody of Sherlock Holmes fiction, the film addresses the topic of narcotics in a very light comedic way.

A 35 mm print of the film still exists in its entirety and is currently in the public domain.

== Plot ==
The frame story presents Douglas Fairbanks submitting a new script to the scenario editor of a film studio.

The embedded story shows an investigation led by Coke Ennyday: this private detective, who makes an immoderate and constant use of drugs, including cocaine, is hired by the local police of Short Beach to discover the real means of subsistence of an extremely wealthy and mysterious man. To wash the dirty money coming from the smuggling of opium, the latter, Fishy Joe, is using a rental shop located on the beach, where swimmers can rent air mattresses in the form of fishes; customers are invited to "Jump the Leaping Fish!" and try to ride or stand on the mattress in the surf.

Joe also wants to force Inane (a female employee of the shop, whose work is to blow air into the inflatable mattresses) to marry him within a week. While Ennyday observes opium being brought into the shop, Joe, who does not notice him, sees that Inane has observed them and he has her kidnapped by his Asian (Note: Ennyday calls them "Japs".) accomplices, who take her to a laundry shop in Chinatown, where they have their headquarters.

There, Ennyday, who has followed them, dismantles the gang by fighting them all, including Joe. Inane and Ennyday show signs of mutual love as the embedded story ends.

This scenario is rejected and the editor dismissively advises Douglas to go back to acting.

== Themes ==
The Mystery of the Leaping Fish

In this unusually broad comedy for Fairbanks, the lead actor plays "Coke Ennyday", a cocaine-shooting detective who is a parody of Sherlock Holmes. Ennyday is given to injecting himself from a bandolier of syringes worn across his chest, and helps himself to the contents of a container of white powder labeled "COCAINE" on his desk.

Fairbanks' character otherwise lampoons Sherlock Holmes with checkered detective hat, clothes and even car, along with the aforementioned propensity for injecting cocaine whenever he feels momentarily down, then laughing with delight. A device used for observing visitors, which is referred to in the title cards as his "scientific periscope", bears a close resemblance to a modern closed-circuit television. What is apparently a clock face has "EATS", "DRINKS", "SLEEPS", and "DOPE" instead of numbers.

The film displays a lighthearted and comic attitude toward Coke Ennyday's use of cocaine and laudanum. While he catches a gang of drug smugglers, he stops them only after sampling their opium.

== Cast ==
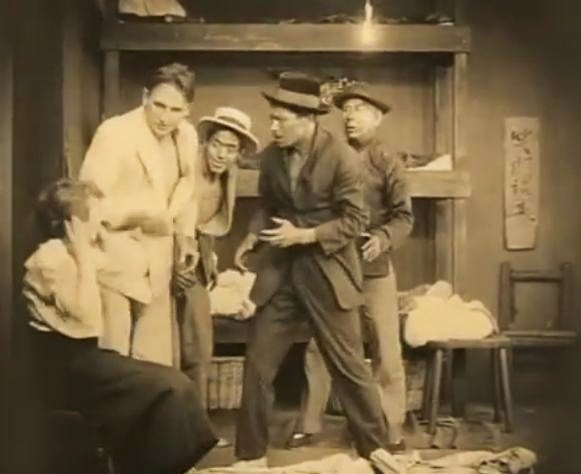
Inane (Bessie Love) while she is being kept prisoner in the laundry shop run by the opium smugglers (still from the film)

- Douglas Fairbanks as Coke Ennyday/in the frame story, himself
- Bessie Love as Inane, the little "fish" blower at the beach rental shop/in the frame story, Douglas Fairbanks's female friend
- Allan Sears as Fishy Joe Gent Rolling in Wealth (credited as A.D. Sears)
- Alma Rubens as his female accomplice
- Charles Stevens as "Japanese" Accomplice
- Tom Wilson as Police Chief I.M. Keene
- George Hall as "Japanese" accomplice (uncredited)
- William Lowery as gang leader (uncredited)
- Joe Murphy as footman on vehicle (uncredited)
- B.F. Zeidman as scenario editor in the frame story (uncredited)

== Production ==
Running a total of 25 minutes, the film was initially shot by Christy Cabanne, who was later fired from the production. John Emerson was hired and re-shot the film with the help of Tod Browning.

When filming in Chinatown, the production was attacked by members of the community, because the producers had not requested to film in the neighborhood.

Despite the lack of evidence, the name of D. W. Griffith has been associated with the production by certain sources.

=== Background ===
The Mystery of the Leaping Fish was released in 1916, the first year after the Harrison Act took effect. Narcotic prohibition was still a new concept in the United States, and the use of opiates and cocaine was much more socially acceptable than today. Furthermore, the censorious Hays Code would not be instituted for another fourteen years after the film's release. With the introduction of the code, depictions of intravenous drug use were not shown in major motion pictures. During the era of the Hays Code, films that dealt with controversial topics such as drug use were morality plays that illustrated the degradation that surrounds the use of such drugs.

== Reception ==
The film was a departure for Fairbanks due to the subject matter and the fact that he generally appeared in feature films, not two-reelers. The Mystery of the Leaping Fish was the second film Fairbanks did with director John Emerson, their first being His Picture in the Papers (released in February 1916) which was a hit.

While The Mystery of the Leaping Fish is now considered something of a cult film due its comedic dealings of drug use, Fairbanks hated the film and reportedly wanted to have it withdrawn from circulation. Fairbanks biographer Jeffrey Vance describes The Mystery of the Leaping Fish as "undoubtedly the most bizarre film Fairbanks made" and that the entire scenario is "a hallucinogenic odyssey into the absurd...."
