= The Fall of Eve =

1929 film directed by Frank R. Strayer

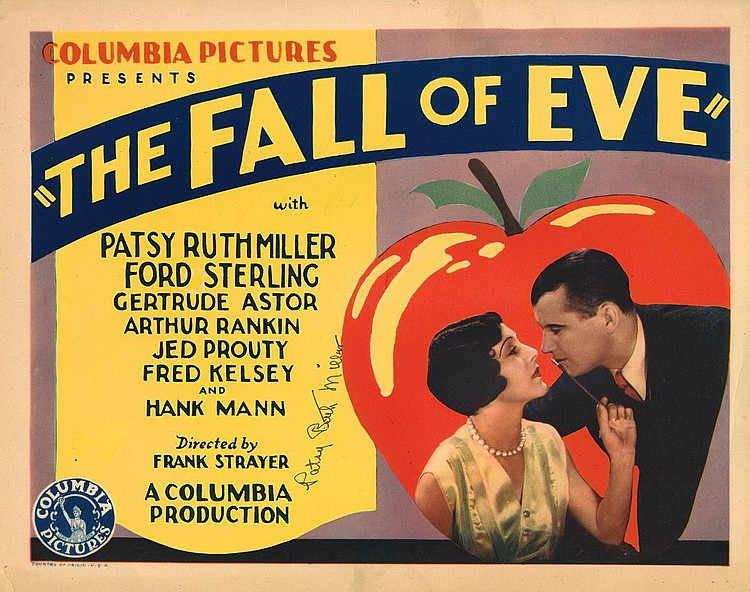
- Directed by: Frank R. Strayer
- Screenplay by: Gladys Lehman; Frederic Hatton (dial.); Fannie Hatton (dial.)
- Story by: Anita Loos; John Emerson
- Produced by: Harry Cohn
- Starring: Patsy Ruth Miller; Ford Sterling; Gertrude Astor
- Cinematography: Teddy Tetzlaff
- Edited by: Gene Havlick
- Production company: Columbia Pictures
- Distributed by: Columbia Pictures
- Release date: June 25, 1929 (US)
- Running time: 6 reels
- Country: United States
- Language: English

The Fall of Eve is a 1929 American comedy film directed by Frank R. Strayer, which stars Patsy Ruth Miller, Ford Sterling, and Gertrude Astor. The screenplay was written by Gladys Lehman, from a story by Anita Loos and John Emerson, and the film was released by Columbia Pictures on June 25, 1929.

== Plot ==
Eve Grant (Patsy Ruth Miller), a smart and capable secretary, works for Tom Ford, Sr. (Jed Prouty), the wealthy owner of a woolen mill. She and his son, Tom Ford, Jr. (Arthur Rankin), are in love, but Tom has never told his father that his sweetheart is “just” a stenographer. Ford, Sr. is ambitious for his son, hoping he will make a brilliant marriage to elevate the family’s social position.

When he scolds Tom for wasting time on an uneducated girl of no consequence, the two quarrel bitterly. In a fit of pride, Tom leaves his father’s business.

Ford, Sr. soon has to focus on business, for the woolen trade is slack and competition fierce. He receives word that his biggest customer, the flamboyant Mr. Mack (Ford Sterling), will be visiting. Ford cancels a weekend party with his new bride, Mrs. Ford (Gertrude Astor), to entertain Mack properly.

When Mr. and Mrs. Mack (Betty Farrington) arrive, Mrs. Mack complains of a headache and excuses herself from evening plans. Mack, outwardly attentive but inwardly eager to “whoopee,” seeks out Ford and postpones their conference in favor of a night of revelry.

At Ford’s office, Mack glimpses a woman leaving—Mrs. Ford herself. Mack, assuming she is a “companion,” praises Ford’s taste in women and insists she accompany them to the party. Ford insists the woman was his wife, but Mack laughs this off. Ford, trapped in a dilemma, confides in Eve. Loyal to her employer, Eve agrees to pose as Mrs. Ford to help him out.

Ford phones Mack to arrange the evening, and Mack foolishly tells his wife that Mrs. Ford will be joining them. Suddenly her “headache” vanishes, and she insists on going out to meet the prominent Mrs. Ford.

At the Ford home, Mrs. Mack warmly greets Eve as “Mrs. Ford.” With no way out, Ford and Mack allow the misunderstanding to continue.

The party heads to the Rendezvous Café. Mrs. Mack requests her favorite tune, which the orchestra leader dedicates over the microphone to “Mr. and Mrs. Tom Ford.” At the weekend party in the country, where Mrs. Ford was supposed to be, the radio broadcast sparks gossip and embarrassment. Humiliated, Mrs. Ford leaves immediately for town to confront her husband.

At the café, Mack grows boisterous and Ford, irritated, tries to end the evening. He secretly calls on Tom, Jr. for help. Tom agrees—but only if his father consents to his marriage with Eve. Desperate, Ford agrees.

Arriving at the café, Tom seizes on a prohibition agent’s dropped badge. Disguising himself, he threatens to raid the place and passes a note to his father. Ford signals the others to leave quietly, but when Tom steps in to “arrest” the party, he drags things out, suspicious of Eve’s involvement. Eve, hurt by his mistrust, grows cold and proud.

Forced to continue the ruse, Ford invites the Macks back to his home for a “real party.” Meanwhile, Mrs. Ford arrives at the Rendezvous and, learning her husband has just left, drives straight to the Ford house.

At home, things become more tangled. Tom grows jealous and demands an explanation from Eve, who refuses to justify herself. Mrs. Mack, playing peacemaker, insists on a “reconciliation,” even forcing Eve and Ford into the upstairs bedroom to make up. The revelers retire for the night.

Downstairs, Mack raids the icebox. Mrs. Ford enters and, mistaking him for a burglar, summons the police. Still tipsy, Mack flirts with her, spilling the tale of his evening with “Mrs. Ford.” Horrified, she declares her identity just as Mrs. Mack and a policeman enter. Mrs. Mack scoffs that the woman must be crazy—since “Mrs. Ford” is asleep upstairs.

Ford hurries down, only to freeze when confronted by both women. His real wife seizes him, demanding, “Am I or am I not Mrs. Tom Ford?” He meekly affirms she is.

Attention then shifts to Eve, still on the stairs with Tom. Mrs. Mack demands to know who she is. Eve, rising to the moment, turns to Tom and repeats Mrs. Ford’s challenge: “Am I or am I not Mrs. Tom Ford?” With perfect timing, Tom replies, “Certainly—you are Mrs. Tom Ford, Jr.”

The truth is deflected neatly. Ford, Sr., relieved, embraces the clarification. Mrs. Ford, realizing the importance of keeping Mack as a client, plays along smoothly, apologizing to Mrs. Mack and winning Mack’s admiration for her good sportsmanship.

Mack, reassured, stays on, laughing off the whole mix-up. Tom and Eve slip away upstairs, their romance now openly acknowledged and sanctioned at last.

== Cast list ==
- Patsy Ruth Miller as Eve Grant
- Ford Sterling as Mr. Mack
- Gertrude Astor as Mrs. Ford
- Arthur Rankin as Tom Ford, Jr.
- Jed Prouty as Tom Ford, Sr.
- Betty Farrington as Mrs. Mack
- Fred Kelsey as Cop
- Bob White as Hank Mann

== Production ==
In the Spring 1928, it was announced that Columbia Pictures had obtained the rights to The Fall of Eve, a play by Anita Loos and John Emerson, the same team who had penned Gentlemen Prefer Blondes. The play had successful runs both in New York City and California. In April, it was announced that the play was to be part of Columbia's slate for 1928-29, a group of 36 films dubbed "The Perfect 36".

In May it was revealed that The Fall of Eve would be one of ten "specials" on Columbia's slate, pictures chosen to be done with the new sound technology. In October 1928 Columbia announced that it had signed an agreement with Electrical Research Projects, a subsidiary of Western Electric, to handle the sound engineering for their upcoming films, including The Fall of Eve. The film still had not been cast as of December 1928.

In May 1929 Columbia announced that they had cast Patsy Ruth Miller and Arthur Rankin were cast in leading roles in the picture. Frank Strayer would be helming the film, and the musical accompaniment would be provided by Jackie Taylor and his oosevelt Hotel Orchestra. It would Strayer's first picture for Columbia. In early June it was revealed that Gladys Lehman would be handling the screenplay.

While the American Film Institute's database has the premiere date of June 25, the June 24 issue of The Film Daily announced that the movie had premiered the prior week, on June 17. The Hollywood Filmograph also reported that film premiered on June 17 at the Embassy Theatre in New York City.

== Reception ==
Critics gave the picture mostly positive reviews. The Beatrice Daily Sun gave it a glowing review, saying, "Critical appraisal of both press and Broadway audiences unanimously declared the uproarious story of marital mix-ups one of the best talking productions ever made and the greatest laugh-maker of the season." They praised both the direction of Strayer and the acting of the entire cast. The Tampa Times was also effusive in their praise of the film: "New York critics found themselves forgetting the gravity of life, and according to their reviews, laughed as heartily as the rest of the audiences—something unusual, ife [sic] we are to believe their own claims. Ford Sterling, they explained, is a 'scream', and the whole picture came very near filling the aisles with laughing customers unable to keep their seats or their decorum." They complimented the leads in the film, and were very complimentary towards the supporting comedic actors. The Herald (Rock Hill, South Carolina) called it "a great talkie", saying that it had "great audience appeal", and that each of the "eight comedians, every one a star of repute enact roles with spirit." The also complimented the supporting cast, and praised the dialogue of Frederic and Fannie Hatton. The Arizona Daily Star also enjoyed the film, "'The Fall of Eve' brings together ideal cast to give comedy farce of martial mix-ups with other fun producing situations." Also giving good reviews were The Long Beach Sun, The Atlanta Constitution, The Santa Rosa Republican, and the Los Angeles Evening Post-Record.

Not all the reviews were complimentary, however. The Brooklyn Daily Eagle called it an "indifferent farce". They felt the jokes were stale, the plot commonplace, and the puns fell flat. They felt it was a "mechanical and rather crudely constructed farce". Likewise, the Daily News called it a "two-star film, which is only fairly amusing." They also felt the humor was antiquated and trite, although they complimented the acting.

== See also ==
- List of early sound feature films (1926–1929)
