= Diane of the Green Van =

1919 film by Wallace Worsley

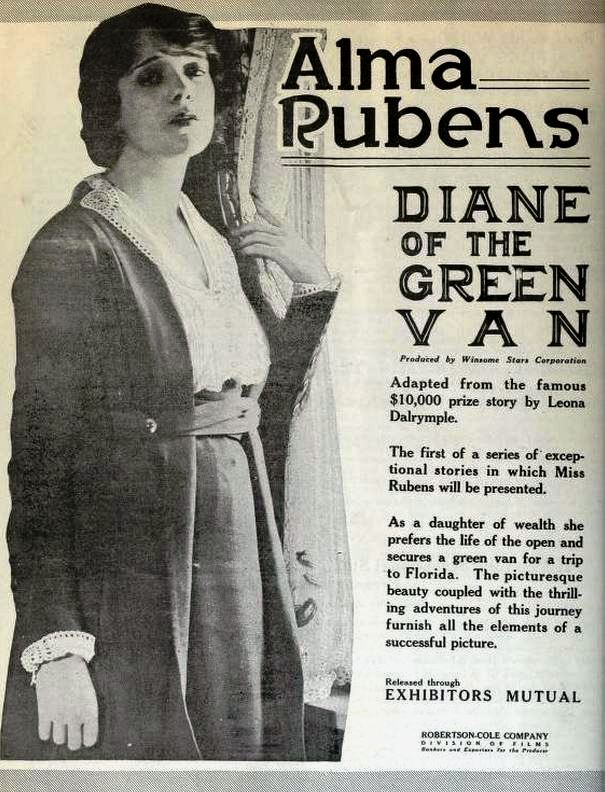
- advertisement
- Directed by: Wallace Worsley
- Written by: Thomas J. Geraghty
- Based on: novel, Diane of the Green Van, by Leona Dalrymple, c.1914
- Produced by: F. Laws Hutton; Winsome Stars Corp.
- Starring: Alma Rubens
- Cinematography: Robert Newhard
- Distributed by: Robertson-Cole
- Release date: April 6, 1919
- Running time: 5 reels
- Country: USA
- Language: Silent ..English titles

Diane of the Green Van is a lost 1919 silent film directed by Wallace Worsley and starring Alma Rubens.

== Cast ==
- Alma Rubens as Diane Westfall
- Nigel Barrie as Philip Poynter
- Lamar Johnstone as Carl Granberry
- Josephine Crowell as Aunt Agatha
- Harry von Meter as Baron Tregar
- Wedgwood Nowell as Prince Ronador
- Ed Brady as Themar
- Alfred Hollingsworth as Mic-co
- Irene Rich as Keela
- Sydney Hayes as
