= The Fall of Eve (play) =

1925 American play

The Fall of Eve is a play written in 1925 by Anita Loos and John Emerson. It was originally titled Aren't Men Brutes, but the title was changed in April 1925. It began an out-of-town tryout run in Stamford Connecticut on May 8. The original cast included Ruth Gordon, Reginald Mason, Claude King, Cora Witherspoon, and Diantha Pattison. It followed that with performances at the Belasco Theatre in Washington D. C., After the D.C. show, the show went on hiatus, expecting to resume in the fall.

On August 24, the show opened out of town at the Savoy Theatre in Asbury Park, New Jersey, for a one-week run, prior to its Broadway premiere. It opened on Broadway at the Booth Theatre on August 31, 1925. The opening night cast included Gordon, King, Mason, Pattison, and Witherspoon, from the original cast, as well as Albert Albertson, Alonzo Fenderson, Doris Kemper, and Nadine Winstan. The play closed the week of October 24, after a run of 48 performances.

== Reception ==
The play received mixed reviews. Burns Mantle of the Daily News gave it a favorable review, saying it was a "pertinent comedy", and the Gordon "scores another palpable hit". However, Alexander Woollcott of the Philadelphia Inquirer gave the play a poor review, saying it was "a dull, daffy and dimly distasteful drama." Similarly, Arthur Pollock of The Brooklyn Daily Eagle also gave the play a terrible review, predicting that its run on Broadway would not be a long one.
