= Loretta Blake =

American actress (1898–1981)

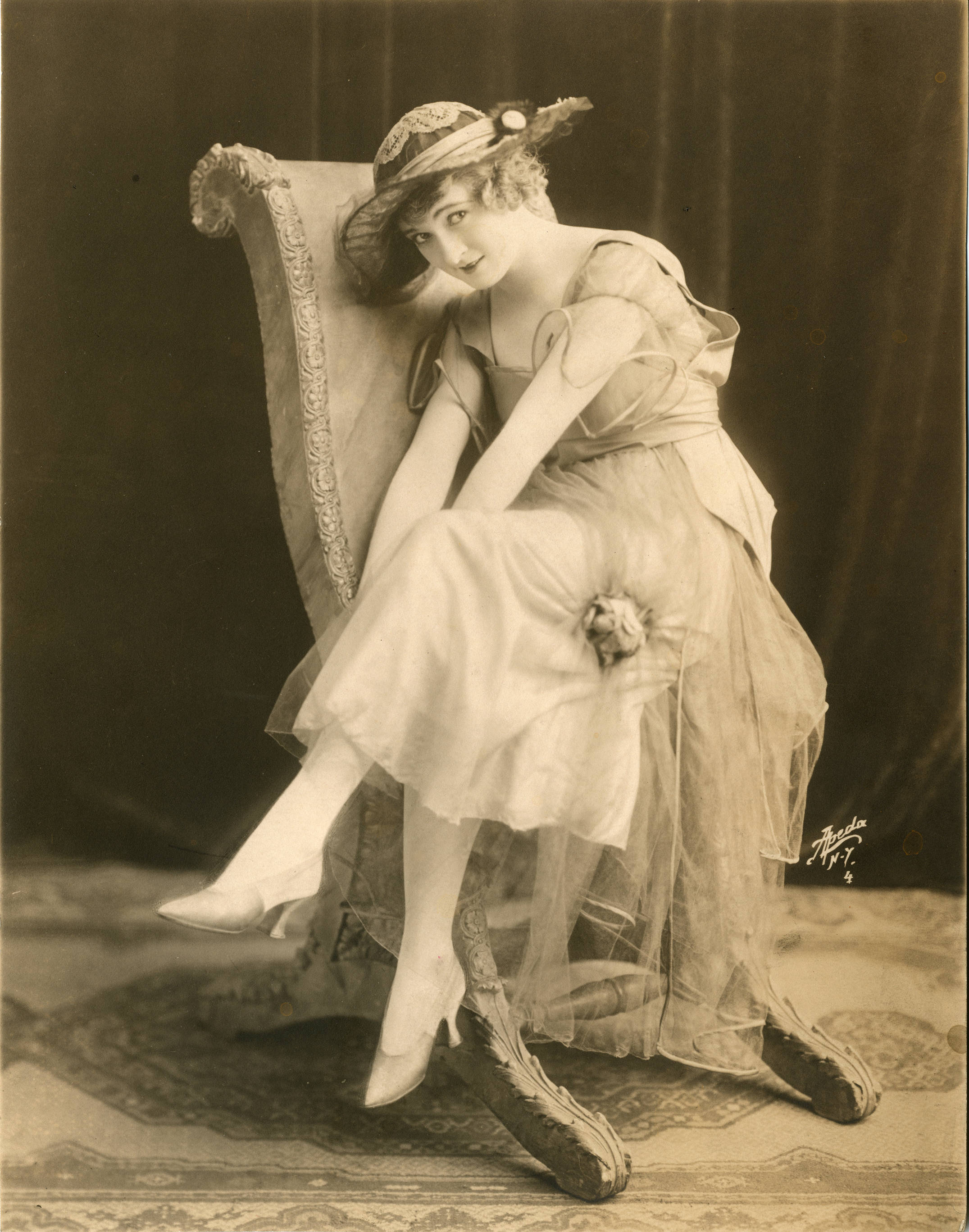
- Blake in 1923
- Born: April 17, 1898; Akron, Ohio, U.S.
- Died: July 30, 1981 (aged 83); Los Angeles, California, U.S.
- Resting place: San Fernando Mission Cemetery
- Occupation: Actress
- Years active: 1914–1921
- Spouse: Nat G. Deverich (divorced)
- Children: 1

Loretta Blake (April 17, 1898 – July 30, 1981) was an American film actress. She appeared in several films between 1914 and 1921.

== Early life ==
Loretta Blake was born on April 17, 1898, at Akron, Ohio.

She attended Saint Mary's Convent in Akron for five years before moving to Los Angeles to live with her grandparents. She attended school at Sacred Heart Convent for one year and concluded her formal education at Los Angeles High School.

== Career ==
She joined the famous D. W. Griffith organization without previous experience. Several of her girlfriends were in picture work and she had dropped around to the studio with one of them one day out of curiosity. She cheerfully accepted an offer to do a small role for pin money and when the director saw her appearance she was hired immediately. She was dainty at five feet two inches and 115 pounds. She married director Nathaniel Deverich. They had one child, Albert Douglas Deverich.

== Death ==
She died on July 30, 1981, at Los Angeles, California.

== Selected filmography ==
- At Dawn (1914)*short
- Baby's Ride (1914)*short
- Branch Number Thirty-Seven (1915)*short
- Probation (1915)*short
- The Sea Brat (1915)*short
- The Broken Lullaby (1915)*short
- His Last Deal (1915)*short
- The Double Crossing of Slim (1915)*short
- The Black Sheep (1915/II)*short
- The Absentee (1915)
- 11:30 P.M. (1915)*short
- Ghosts (1915)
- The Sable Lorcha (1915)
- Ghosts (1915)
- The Eternal Grind (1916)
- His Picture in the Papers (1916)
- The Little Princess (1917)
- One Hundred Percent American (1918)*short
- Just Out of College (1920)
