= Wild and Woolly (1917 film) =

1917 film

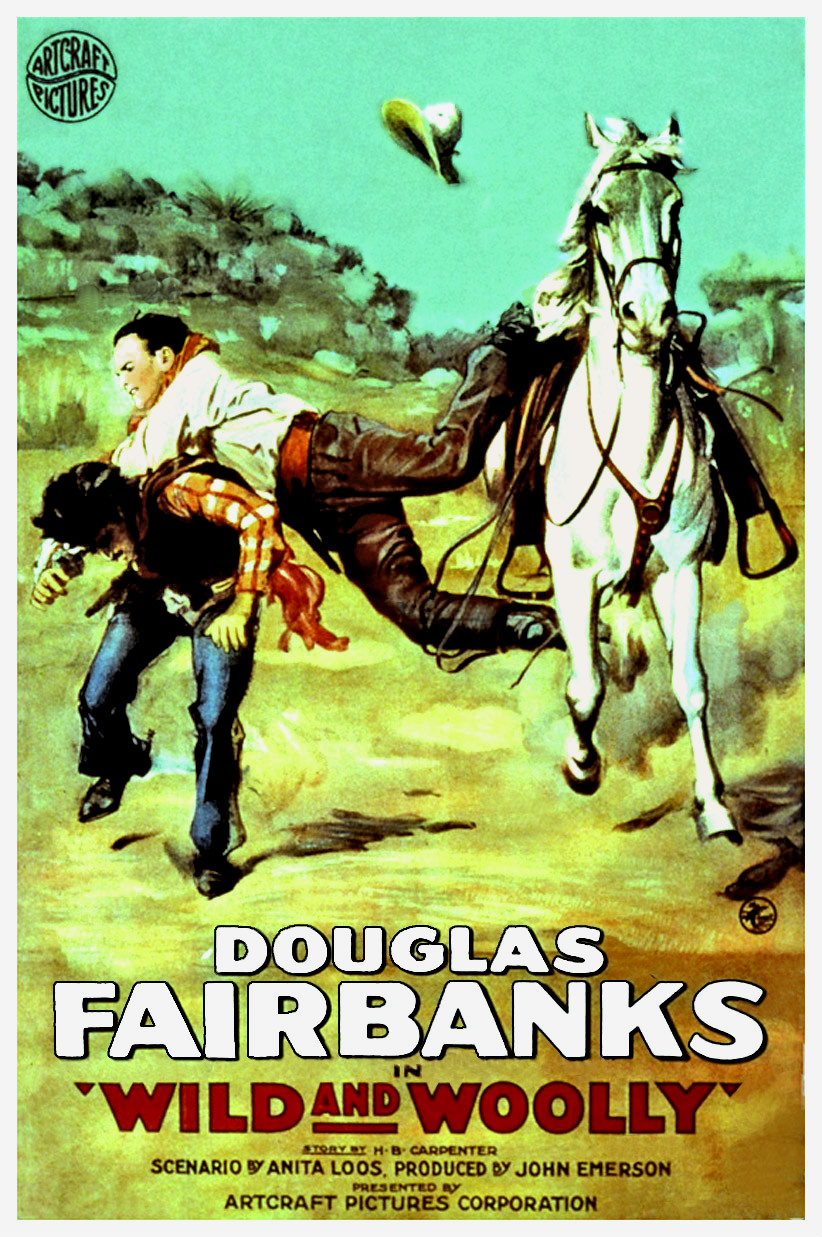
- Theatrical poster
- Directed by: John Emerson
- Written by: Anita Loos
- Based on: Wild and Woolly by Horace B. Carpenter
- Starring: Douglas Fairbanks; Eileen Percy; Walter Bytell; Sam De Grasse
- Cinematography: Victor Fleming
- Production company: Douglas Fairbanks Pictures
- Distributed by: Artcraft Pictures
- Release date: June 24, 1917
- Running time: 5 reels
- Country: United States
- Languages: Silent; English intertitles

Wild and Woolly is a 1917 American silent Western comedy film which tells the story of one man's personal odyssey from cowboy-obsessed Easterner to Western tough guy. It stars Douglas Fairbanks, Eileen Percy, Walter Bytell and Sam De Grasse. The film was adapted by Anita Loos from a story by Horace B. Carpenter and was directed by John Emerson.

== Plot ==
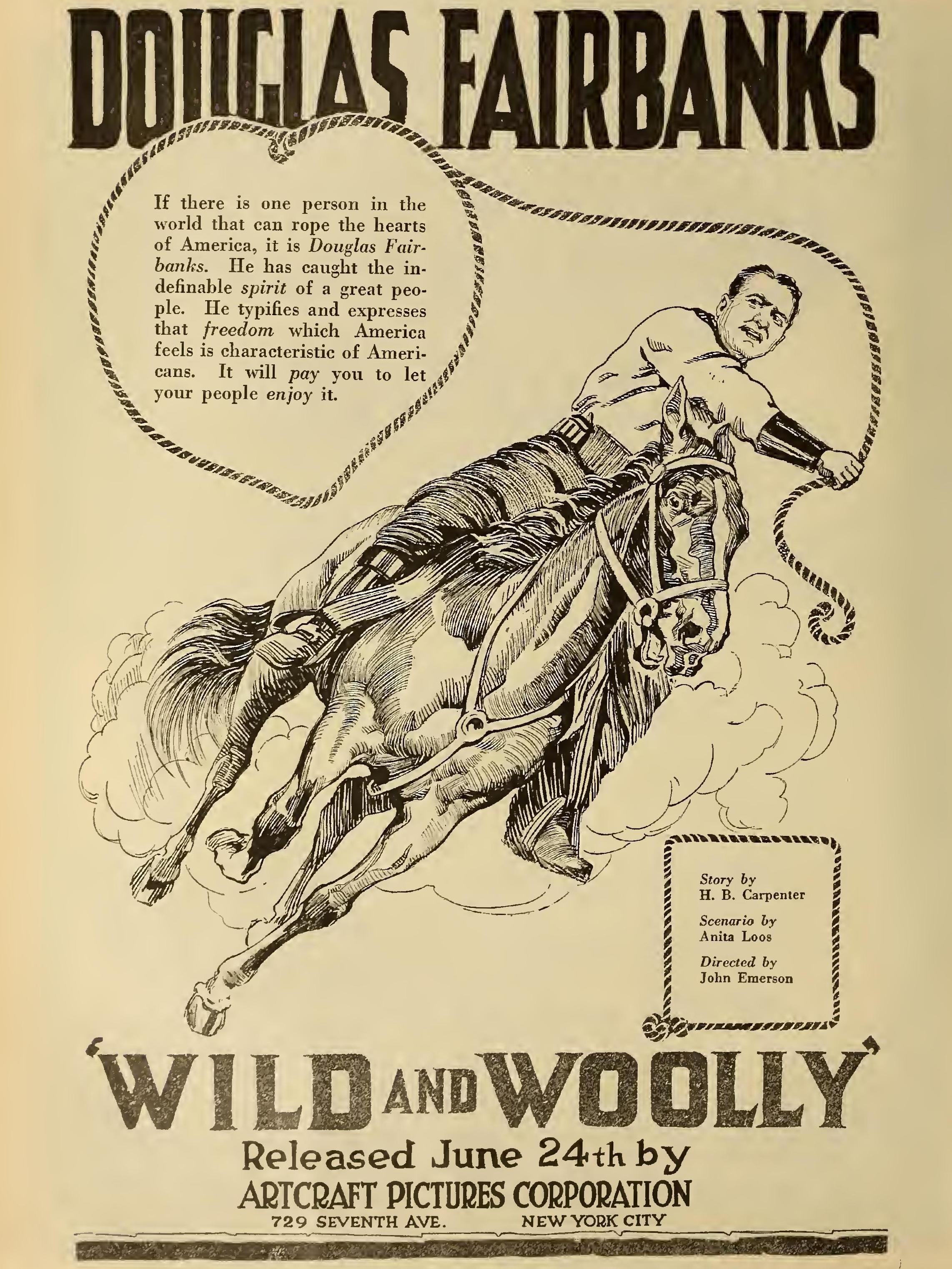
Wild and Woolly ad in Motion Picture News, 1917

As described in a film magazine review, Jeff Hillington, son of railroad magnate Collis J. Hillington, tires of the East and longs for the wild and woolly West. He has his apartment and office fixed up in his understanding of the accepted Western style, which he has gleaned from dime novels. A delegation from Bitter Creek comes to New York City seeking financial backing for the construction of a spur line, and go to Collis to explain their proposition. Collis sends Jeff to investigate. The citizens of Bitter Creek, Arizona, realizing that a favorable report from Jeff is necessary, decide to live up to Jeff's idea of a Western town. They set up a program with a wild reception for Jeff, a barroom dance, and a train holdup. Steve Shelby, a grafting Indian agent, knowing that he is about to be caught by the government, decides to do "one more trick" and enters into the plan to rob the train, turning it into a real scheme. Events turn earnest and Shelby kidnaps Nell Larabee, with whom Jeff has fallen in love. The entire crowd has been trapped in the dance hall, which is surrounded by Indians, and Jeff's revolver loaded with blanks. When the situation is finally explained to Jeff, by superhuman efforts (and typical Fairbanks surprises) he rounds up the Indians, rescues the girl, completely foils the scheme of Steve, and becomes the hero of the hour, getting to marry Nell.

Wild and Woolly (1917)

== Cast ==
- Douglas Fairbanks as Jeff Hillington
- Eileen Percy as Nell Larabee
- Walter Bytell as Collis J. Hillington
- Joseph Singleton as Judson, the Butler
- Calvert Carter as Tom Larabee, the Hotel Keeper
- Forrest Seabury as Banker
- J. W. Jones as Lawyer
- Charles Stevens as Pedro
- Sam De Grasse as Steve Shelby, the Indian Agent
- Tom Wilson as Casey the Engineer
- Ruth Allen
- Edward Burns
- Wharton James

== Production ==
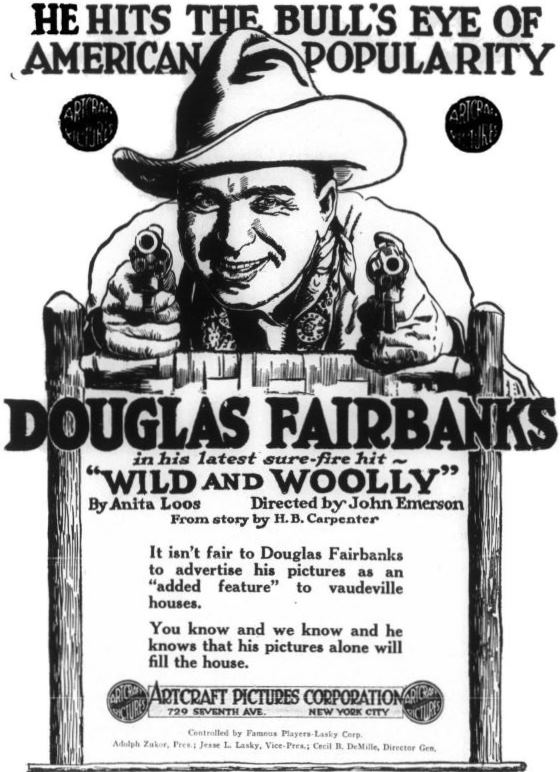

Wild and Woolly was filmed in Manhattan and the Paragon Studio in Fort Lee, New Jersey, where many early film studios in America's first motion picture industry were based at the beginning of the 20th century. The scenes of the Arizona town were shot over a week's time in Burbank, California. Joseph Henabery served as an assistant to director John Emerson.

== Reception ==
Like many American films of the time, Wild and Woolly was subject to cuts by city and state film censorship boards. The Chicago Board of Censors required cuts of the intertitle "Say, that's a chance for us to clean up big," all scenes of the Indian Agent and Indians with a basket containing flasks of liquor, the three intertitles "Whoop it up and all you capture is yours," You watch every door of the hotel and after I get the girl you kill," and "They can't hurt you, their guns are loaded with fake bullets," scene where Fairbanks is shot, an Indian shoots a man, four scenes of Indians falling after being shot, and the shooting of the express messenger, taking his keys, and the rifling of the express box.

Edward Wietzel offered the following in his contemporaneous review for The Moving Picture World: "A cow in a clover field, a cat with a catnip ball or a monkey with a bushel of peanuts never had a more enjoyable time than the gloom-dispersing Mr. Douglas Fairbanks extracts from each of the situations in the photoplay. Most of these situations are not new, but the method of their working out is frequently novel and often exceedingly funny."

Fairbanks biographer Jeffrey Vance, writing in 2008, believes Wild and Woolly "is the finest of the surviving Fairbanks-Emerson-Loos collaborations and perhaps the best of the thirteen films he made for Artcraft. It was also one of Fairbanks's personal favorites."

== Preservation status ==
Copies of Wild and Woolly are preserved in several film collections and archives, and it has been released on DVD. In 2002, this film was deemed "culturally, historically, or aesthetically significant" by the United States Library of Congress and selected for preservation in the National Film Registry.
