= The Valley of Silent Men =

1922 film

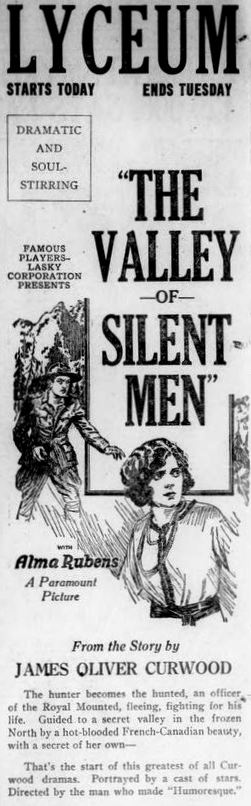
- Newspaper ad
- Directed by: Frank Borzage
- Screenplay by: John Lynch
- Based on: The Valley of Silent Men by James Oliver Curwood
- Starring: Alma Rubens; Lew Cody; Joe King; Mario Majeroni; George Nash; J. W. Johnston
- Cinematography: Chester A. Lyons
- Production company: Cosmopolitan Productions
- Distributed by: Paramount Pictures
- Release date: September 10, 1922
- Running time: 70 minutes
- Country: United States
- Language: Silent (English intertitles)

The Valley of Silent Men (1922) by Frank Borzage

The Valley of Silent Men is a 1922 American silent drama film directed by Frank Borzage and written by John Lynch based upon the novel of the same name by James Oliver Curwood. The film stars Alma Rubens, Lew Cody, Joe King, Mario Majeroni, George Nash, and J. W. Johnston. The film was released on September 10, 1922, by Paramount Pictures. It is not known whether the film currently survives in its entirety.

== Cast ==
- Alma Rubens as Marette Radison
- Lew Cody as Cpl. James Kent
- Joe King as 'Buck' O'Connor
- Mario Majeroni as Pierre Radison
- George Nash as Inspector Kedsty
- J. W. Johnston as Jacques Radison

== Preservation status ==
An incomplete print is held by the Library of Congress which indicates two reels are missing.
