= The Half-Breed (1916 film) =

1916 film by Allan Dwan

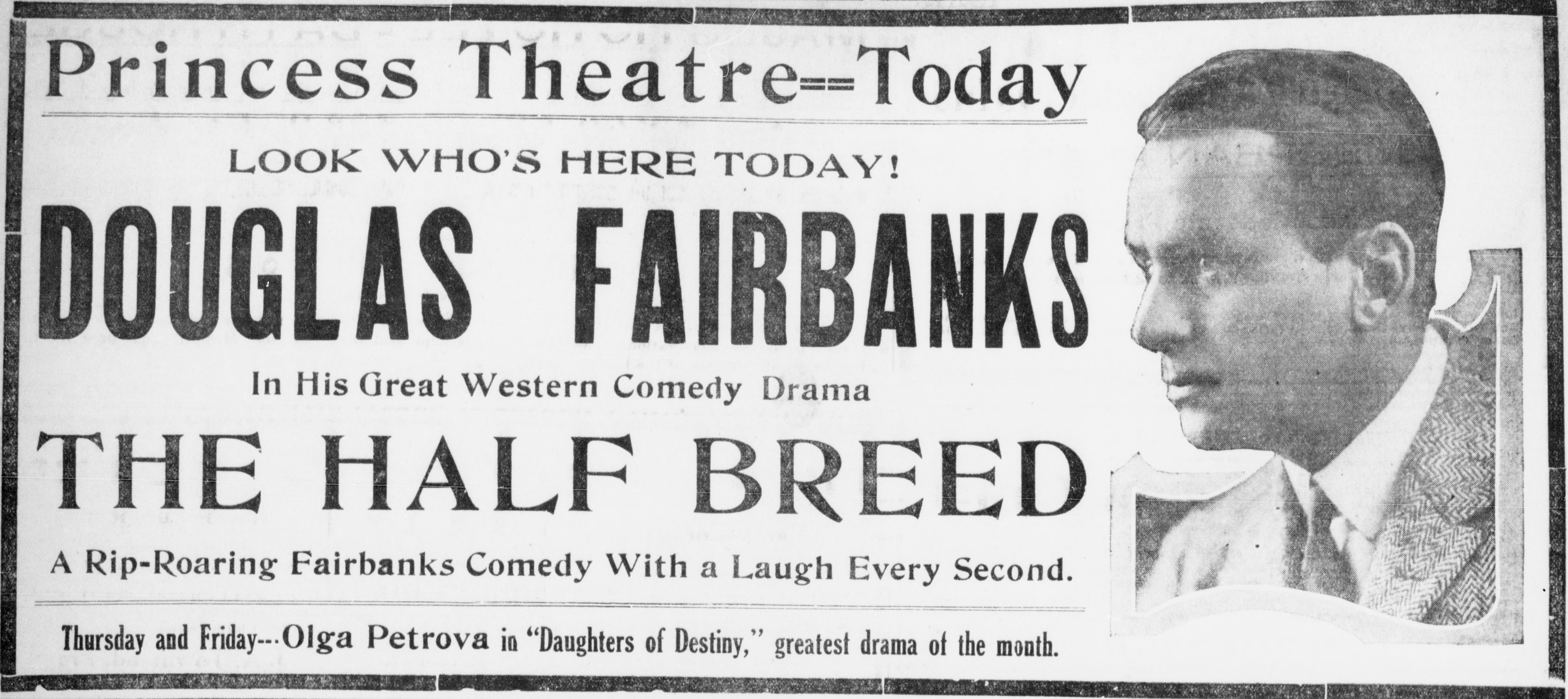
- Newspaper advertisement
- Directed by: Allan Dwan
- Written by: Anita Loos
- Based on: a story by Bret Harte In The Carquinez Woods
- Produced by: D. W. Griffith
- Starring: Douglas Fairbanks
- Cinematography: Victor Fleming
- Distributed by: Triangle Film Corporation
- Release date: July 30, 1916
- Running time: 73 minutes
- Country: USA
- Language: Silent..English titles

The Half-Breed (1916)

The Half-Breed is a 1916 film directed by Allan Dwan. It stars Douglas Fairbanks as Lo Dorman (a pun, as it phonetically means "Sleeping Water" in French) a man competing for the love of the local preacher's daughter (Jewel Carmen) with the local sheriff (Sam De Grasse). The audience, however, are informed that Sheriff Dunn is actually Lo's father.

Monica Nolan has suggested that the film follows the "common strategy of exposing racism and then evading a real confrontation with its consequences" by arranging for Lo to meet a more worthy (and politically acceptable) love interest, Teresa (Alma Rubens), "who, as both a Mexican and an outlaw, is his social equal."

The film was shot at in Sequoia National Park and near Santa Cruz, California.

Prints and/or fragments were found in the Dawson Film Find in 1978.

== Cast ==
- Douglas Fairbanks as Lo Dorman
- Alma Rubens as Teresa
- Sam De Grasse as Sheriff Dunn
- Tom Wilson as Dick Curson
- Frank Brownlee as Winslow Wynn
- Jewel Carmen as Nellie
- George Beranger as Jack Brace

== Production ==
The website Obscure Hollywood describes the context of the film as follows: "In 1915, Douglas Fairbanks, a twelve-year Broadway veteran, was starring in a stage vehicle tailor-made to his personality and athletic skills. Promised that D. W. Griffith would direct his productions (he never did), Fairbanks accepted a three-year contract to make films for Harry Aitken's Triangle Motion Picture Company and its subsidiary Fine Arts Film Company. He quickly became a public favorite and one of the biggest draws in the movies. In The Half-Breed, the eighth of twelve features he would make for Triangle-Fine Arts, Fairbanks drops his typical light-hearted "All-American boy" persona and plays a stern social outcast."

== Reception ==
Frederic Lombardi wrote that the film is “the most original and risky of Fairbanks’ Triangle features”.
