= Reggie Mixes In =

1916 silent film by Christy Cabanne

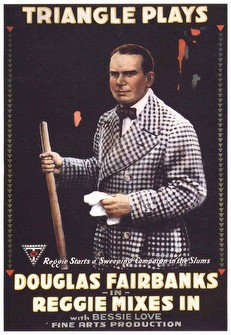
- 1916 theatrical poster
- Directed by: Christy Cabanne
- Screenplay by: Robert Baker
- Story by: Roy Somerville
- Starring: Douglas Fairbanks; Bessie Love
- Cinematography: William Fildew
- Production company: Fine Arts Film Company
- Distributed by: Triangle Film Corporation
- Release date: June 11, 1916 (U.S.)
- Running time: 50 minutes
- Country: United States
- Language: Silent (English intertitles)

Reggie Mixes In, also known as Facing the Music, is a 1916 American silent action/comedy-drama film starring Douglas Fairbanks and directed by Christy Cabanne. The film was produced by Fine Arts Film Company and distributed by Triangle Film Corporation. The film is extant and in the public domain.

== Plot ==
Reggie Mixes In (1916)

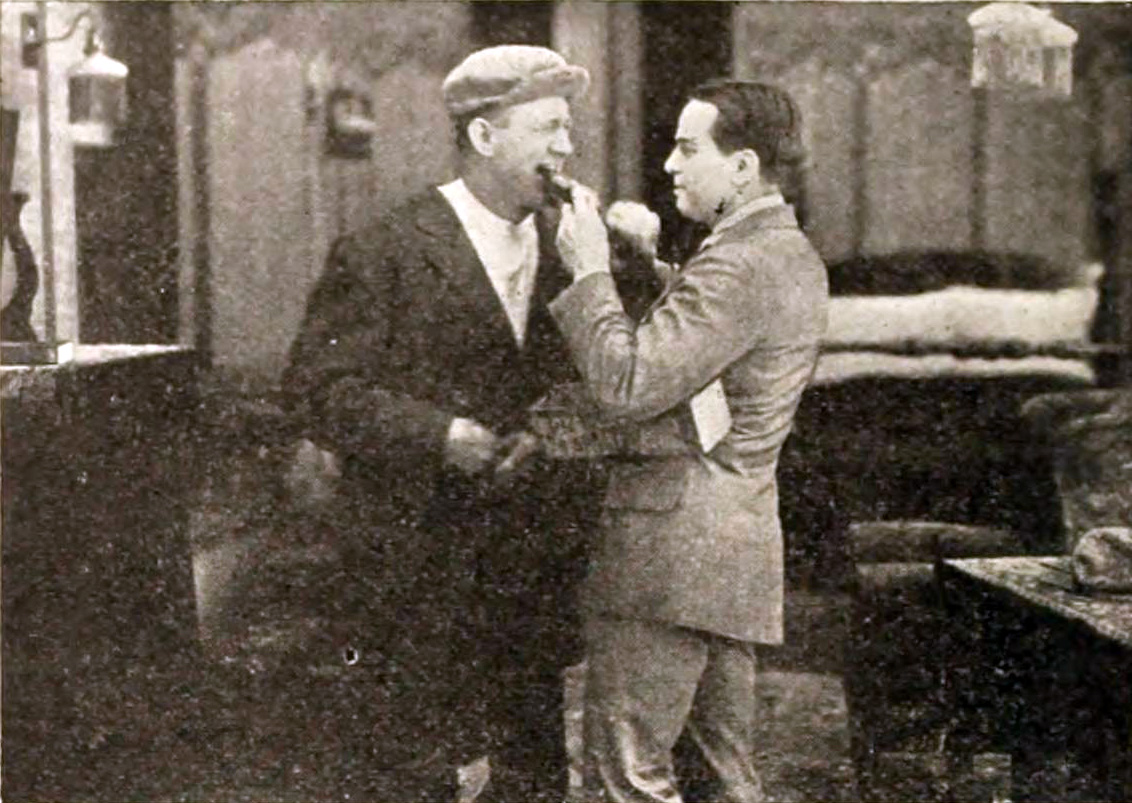
Film still

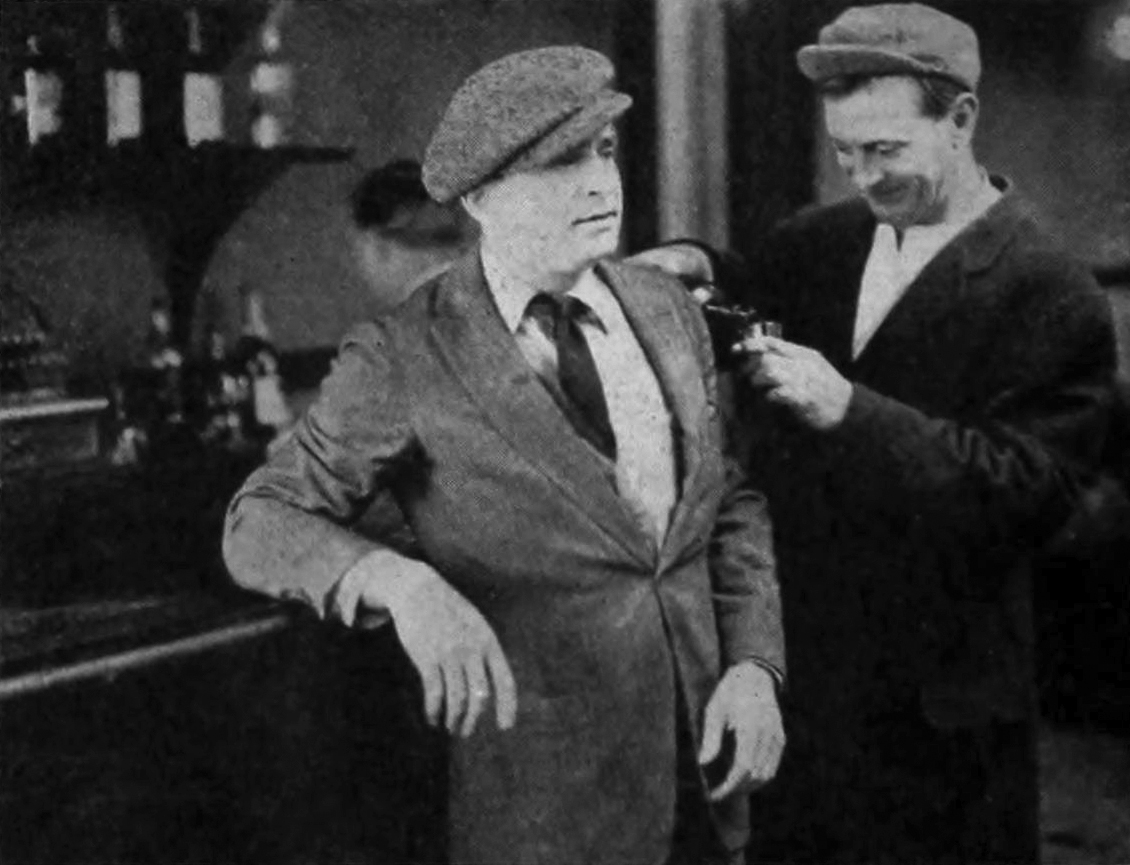
Film still

Wealthy Reggie Morton (Fairbanks) falls in love with Agnes Shannon (Love), a dancer on the Bowery, and takes a job as a bouncer to be near her. His rival is Tony Bernard (Lowery), the leader of a gang, whose henchmen attack Reggie. Reggie fights them off, and then fights the gang leader in an empty warehouse to determine the winner of Agnes's love.

== Cast ==
- Douglas Fairbanks as Reggie Morton
- Bessie Love as Agnes Shannon
- Joseph Singleton as Old Pickleface
- William Lowery as Tony Bernard
- Wilbur Higby as Gallagher
- Allan Sears as Sylvester Ringrose
- Lillian Langdon as Reggie's Aunt Susan
- Alma Rubens as Lemona Reighley
- Alberta Lee as Agnes' Mother
- Tom Wilson as The Bouncer

== Production ==
The working title for the film was The Bouncer. The film was predominantly made in a studio, although some scenes were filmed in Newport in Orange County in 1916.

== Reception ==
Douglas Fairbanks received positive reviews for his performance, while Bessie Love's reviews were mixed.
