= The Americano (1916 film) =

1916 film

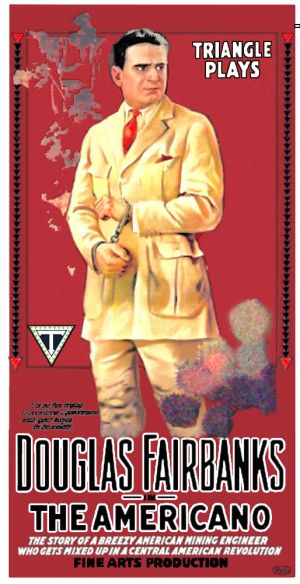
- Theatrical release poster
- Directed by: John Emerson
- Written by: John Emerson (scenario); Anita Loos (scenario and titles)
- Based on: Blaze Derringer by Eugene P. Lyle, Jr.
- Produced by: Fine Arts Film Company
- Starring: Douglas Fairbanks
- Cinematography: Victor Fleming
- Production company: Fine Arts Film Company
- Distributed by: Triangle Film Corporation (original release); S.A. Lynch Enterprises (re-release)
- Release dates: December 24, 1916 (original release); August 21, 1923 (re-release)
- Running time: 61 minutes
- Country: United States
- Language: Silent (English intertitles)

The Americano is a 1916 American silent adventure/romantic comedy film directed by John Emerson and stars Douglas Fairbanks in his last production for Triangle Film Corporation. Based on the novel Blaze Derringer, by Eugene P. Lyle, Jr., the scenario was written by John Emerson and Anita Loos who also wrote the film's intertitles. The film was re-released by S.A. Lynch Enterprises on August 21, 1923. Three 16mm prints and one 8mm print of the film still exists. Set in a fictional South American country of Paragonia, it has been described as one of a group of films that supported United States imperialism by providing support to the idea of manifest destiny.

== Cast ==
- Douglas Fairbanks as Blaze Derringer
- Alma Rubens as Juana de Castille
- Spottiswoode Aitken as Presidente de Castille
- Carl Stockdale as Salsa Espada
- Tote Du Crow as Alberto de Castille
- Charles Stevens as Colonel Gargaras
- Mildred Harris as Stenographer
- Lillian Langdon as Senora de Castille
- Thomas Jefferson
- Tom Wilson as Hartod Armitage White aka Whitey
- Marguerite Marsh
- Alan Hale Sr.

The Americano (1916)

== Production ==
The website Obscure Hollywood notes, "An unfortunate element of The Americano is the presence of a stereotypical black man, an example of the casual racism of the time. This character, Hartod Armitage White (even his name is a joke), aka "Whitey", is first seen hiding from the soldiers who have wrecked the office of Blaze's American mining company. His cowardice, servile demeanor, shuffling walk, and speech pattern (as written in the subtitles) are all part of the stereotype. Also typical of the time, Whitey is played by a white man (Tom Wilson) in blackface. The impersonation is obvious, another accepted element of public portrayals of African Americans.."

== Contract with Triangle Film ==
Although Fairbanks was receiving $15,000 per week during production of The Americano, making him the third highest-paid actor after Mary Pickford and Charlie Chaplin, he considered himself underpaid given his films made millions for the studio. He was able to end his contract with Triangle following The Americano by noting that one of its clauses required that Fairbanks' films be supervised by director D. W. Griffith, which Triangle had not done for several of his last films.
