= Alma Rubens =

American actress (1897–1931)

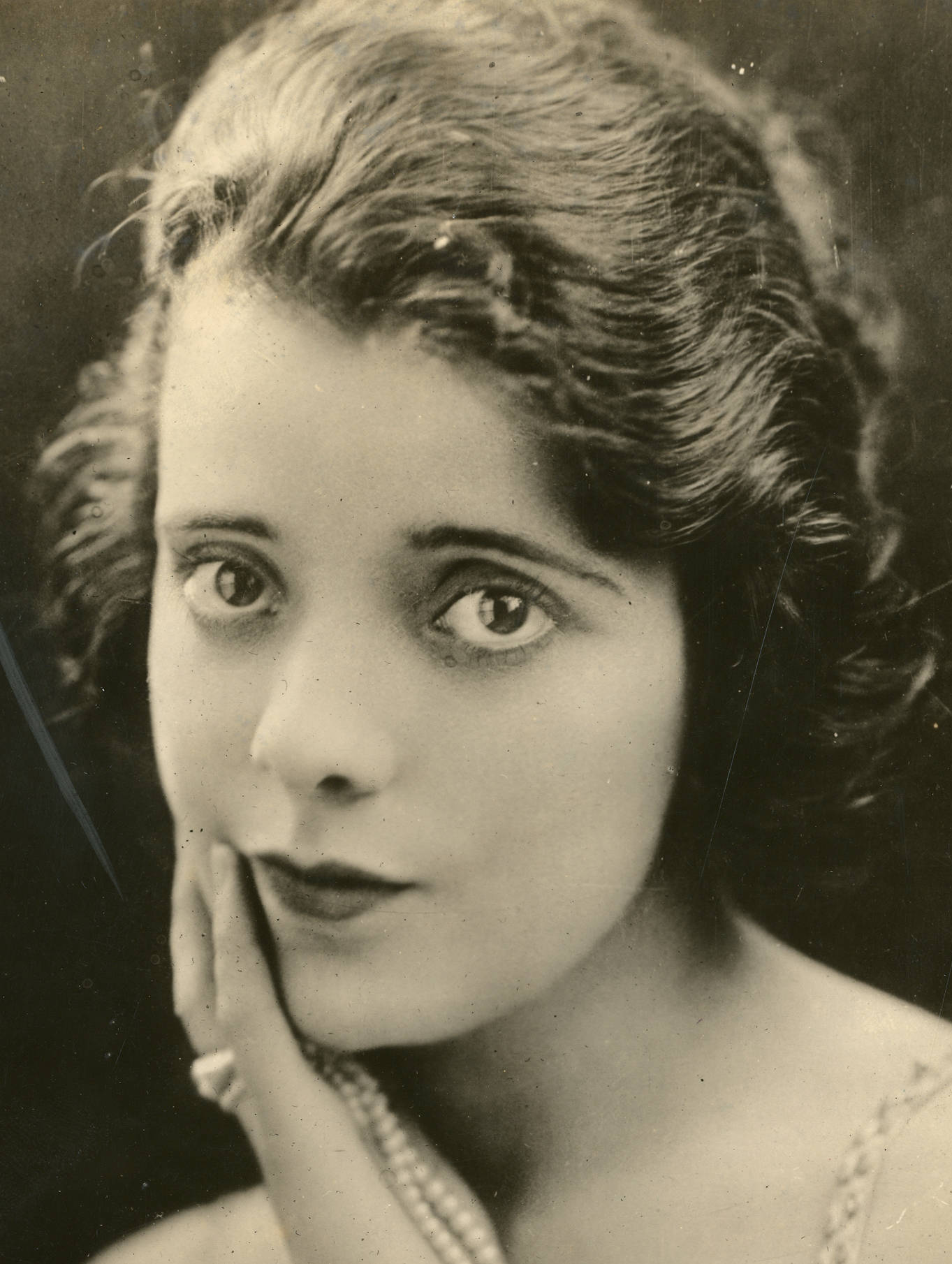
- Rubens in 1919
- Born: February 19, 1897; San Francisco, California, U.S.
- Died: January 21, 1931 (aged 33); Los Angeles, California, U.S.
- Resting place: Mountain View Cemetery
- Other names: Alma Ruben; Alma Reubens; Genevieve Driscoll; Rosa LaFrance
- Occupation: Actress
- Years active: 1913–1929
- Spouses: Franklyn Farnum (m. 1918; div. 1919) Daniel Carson Goodman (m. 1923; div. 1925) Ricardo Cortez (m. 1926; sep. 1930)

Alma Rubens (February 19, 1897 – January 21, 1931) was an American film actress and stage performer.

Rubens began her career in the mid-1910s. She quickly rose to stardom in 1916 after appearing opposite Douglas Fairbanks in The Half-Breed. For the remainder of the decade, she appeared in supporting roles in comedies and dramas. In the 1920s, she developed a drug addiction that eventually ended her career. She died of lobar pneumonia and bronchitis shortly after being arrested for cocaine possession in January 1931.

== Early life ==
Alma and her elder sister, Hazel (born 1893) were raised in their mother's Catholic faith and attended Sacred Heart Convent in San Francisco.

Some biographies erroneously state that her birth name was Genevieve Driscoll. That name was in fact a pseudonym that she later used in a non-professional capacity, as Genevieve was her middle name and Driscoll was her maternal grandmother's maiden name.

== Career ==
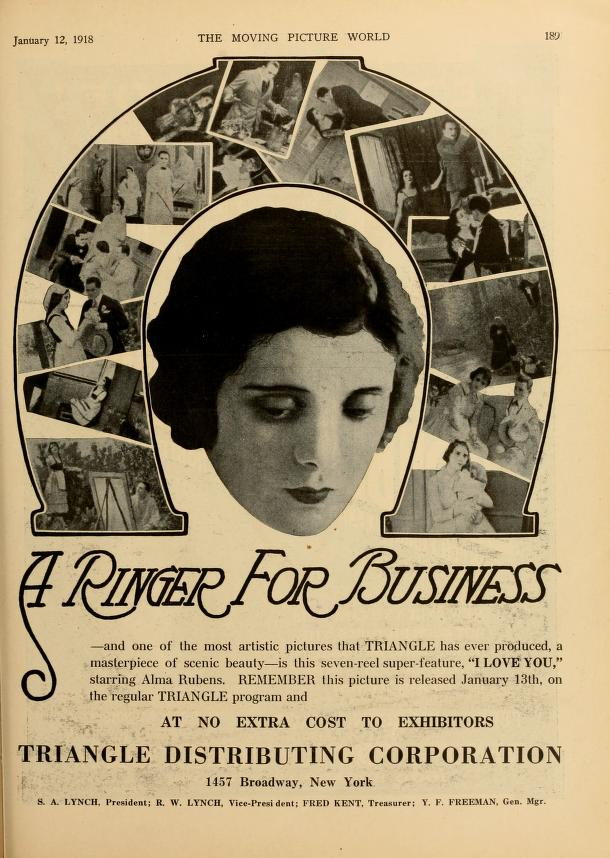
Rubens as "Felice" in I Love You (1918)

Her first stage opportunity came when a chorus girl in a musical comedy theater troupe became ill. Rubens was chosen to take her place and joined the troupe as a regular performer. There she met Franklyn Farnum, who was also a member. He later convinced Rubens to leave the troupe and try film acting.

In 1916, Rubens signed with Triangle Film Corporation. Her first film for the company was the comedy-drama Reggie Mixes In, starring Douglas Fairbanks. Later the same year, Rubens was re-teamed with Fairbanks for cocaine comedy The Mystery of the Leaping Fish, The Half-Breed and The Americano. The next year, Rubens co-starred in two westerns, Truthful Tolliver with William S. Hart and The Firefly of Tough Luck with Charles Gunn. In 1918, she announced that she was changing the spelling of her last name from Rueben to "Rubens" because it caused too much confusion in the movie industry and publications. She later told Photoplay magazine, "As a matter of fact, my name is not the same [spelling] as the painter's. It's either Reubens or Ruebens—I forget which. I never could spell it. Couldn't remember where the 'e' came. So I let it go Rubens."

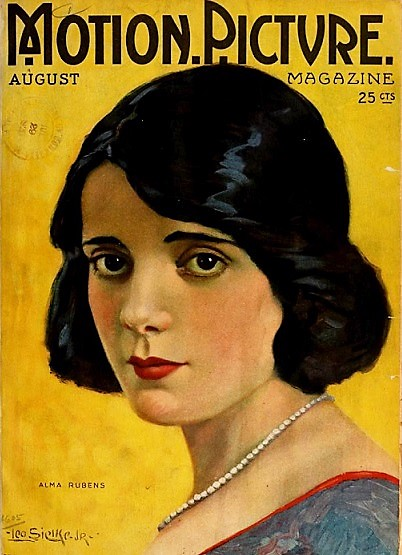
Rubens on the August 1920 edition of Motion Picture magazine.

In 1920, Rubens signed with William Randolph Hearst's Cosmopolitan Productions. The studio promoted Rubens as its newest starlet, falsely claiming she was a descendant of Flemish painter Peter Paul Rubens. Her first film for the studio was Humoresque, which became the studio's only hit that year. Later that year, she starred in dramas The World and His Wife, opposite Montague Love, and Thoughtless Women, both of which further solidified her popularity.

By 1921, Rubens had developed an addiction to heroin after she was prescribed morphine by a doctor for a physical ailment. Due to her drug use and difficult behavior on set, William Randolph Hearst removed her from a film she was set to star in but kept her on the payroll for the next two years. There were rumors that Hearst continued to pay her a salary because the two were involved romantically. Hearst denied this rumor, claiming he continued to pay Rubens because he had invested a substantial amount of money promoting her as the studio's leading lady and that good lead actresses were difficult to find. Rubens returned to the screen in 1922 with roles in Find the Woman and The Valley of Silent Men. Her final film for Cosmopolitan Productions was the historical drama Under the Red Robe in 1923. Hearst released Rubens from her contract the same year.

In 1924, she starred in The Price She Paid for Columbia Pictures Corporation and had a supporting role in the Associated First National production Cytherea. From 1925 to 1926, she worked for Fox Film Corporation. While at Fox, she starred in the hit melodrama East Lynne (1925) opposite Edmund Lowe and Lou Tellegen. She also had roles in The Gilded Butterfly with Bert Lytell and Siberia (both 1926), the latter of which re-teamed Rubens with Edmund Lowe and Lou Tellegen. Her final film for Fox was 1927's Heart of Salome, after which she decided to work freelance.

=== Drug abuse and decline ===
By late 1927, Rubens' drug addiction severely impacted her career as she was frequently admitted to sanitariums for treatment for months at a time. One of her latter roles was as Julie in the 1929 part-sound film version of Show Boat, her next-to-last film role and one of her few sound films. The soundtrack for the portion in which she spoke, however, has apparently been lost.

In February 1929, Rubens' addiction became known publicly when she attempted to stab a physician who was taking her to a sanatorium for treatment. She was ordered to undergo treatment at the Spadra facility shortly thereafter. She later escaped despite being under the watch of four nurses and two male guards. She was then admitted to a sanatorium in Pasadena but left after 10 days. On May 15, 1929, Rubens' husband, Ricardo Cortez, and her mother had Rubens committed to Patton State Hospital for treatment after she resumed her drug habit. Rubens was released from Patton State Hospital in late December 1929.

She made her first public appearance after her release on January 30, 1930, in a role in a play produced at the Writer's Club in Hollywood. Her performance was well-received by the audience, and she received eight curtain calls. After the show, Rubens gave an interview to United Press stating that she was cured of her addiction. During the interview, she described her descent into drug abuse and her experiences at the sanatoriums.

In early February 1930, Rubens traveled to New York, where she announced she was now free of drug addiction and planning a comeback with a vaudeville tour in the East. She made an appearance on stage with her husband, but returned to California the same month. She was there less than two weeks when, on January 5, 1931, she was arrested by Federal officers in San Diego for cocaine possession and conspiracy to smuggle morphine from Mexico into the United States. Rubens claimed she was being framed, and physicians attested to her statements that she was not taking drugs. She was later released on $5,000 bail and appeared for a preliminary hearing the second week of January 1931.

== Personal life ==
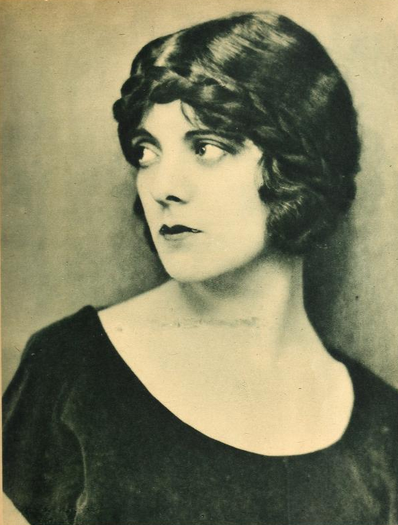
Rubens in 1923

Rubens married three times. Her first marriage was to actor Franklyn Farnum, nearly 20 years her senior, in June 1918. Rubens and Farnum were married secretly and separated about two months later. According to Rubens' divorce petition, Farnum physically abused her and once dislocated her jaw. Their divorce was finalized in December 1919. In November 1923, she married Dr. Daniel Carson Goodman, an author and film producer. They separated in late 1924, and Rubens filed for divorce in January 1925.

Rubens third and final marriage was to actor Ricardo Cortez, whom she married on January 30, 1926, in Riverside, California. As her divorce from Goodman was not yet finalized, the new marriage was considered invalid. They were remarried on February 8.

While touring the vaudeville circuit in mid-1930, the couple separated. At the time of her death, Rubens was suing Cortez for divorce. Cortez claimed he had not been notified of his wife's death, and later remarked that he had not seen her for several months and was unaware that she was seriously ill.

== Death ==
Shortly after her release from jail on charges of cocaine possession, Rubens contracted a cold that quickly developed into lobar pneumonia and bronchitis. She fell into a coma at the Los Angeles home of her friend, Dr. Charles J. Pflueger. She died on January 21, 1931, at the age of 33, having never regained consciousness. A funeral service was held on January 24 at the Little Church of the Flowers at Forest Lawn Memorial Park, Glendale. Her body was then shipped to Fresno where a second service was held at the Christian Science Church on January 26. She is interred in a mausoleum at Mountain View Cemetery in Fresno.

For her contribution to the motion picture industry, Alma Rubens has a star on the Hollywood Walk of Fame located at 6409 Hollywood Blvd.

== In popular culture ==
This Bright World Again, Rubens' memoirs, was serialized in national newspapers in 1931. The text details Rubens' career and her struggle with drug addiction. The full text, with a biography and filmography by Gary D. Rhodes and Alexander Webb titled Alma Rubens, Silent Snowbird: Her Complete 1930 Memoir, with a New Biography and Filmography, was published by McFarland in 2006.

== Filmography ==
Year	Title	Role	Notes
1914	Narcotic Spectre		Short film Lost film
1914	The Gangsters and the Girl	Molly	Short film
1915	Banzai	Mirami – Daughter of a Samurai	Short film Lost film
1915	The Birth of a Nation	Belle of 1861	Uncredited
1915	The Lorelei Madonna	Alma – the Lorelei Madonna	Short film Credited as Alma Ruben; Lost film
1915	Peer Gynt	Bit Role	Uncredited
1915	A Woman's Wiles	Lucile Bergere – a Parisian Model	Credited as Alma Ruben; Lost film
1916	Reggie Mixes In	Lemona Reighley	
1916	The Mystery of the Leaping Fish	Gang Leader's Female Accomplice	Short film Uncredited.
1916	The Half-Breed	Teresa	
1916	Judith of the Cumberlands		Alternative title: The Moonshine Menace; Lost film
1916	Intolerance	Girl at the Marriage Market	Uncredited
1916	The Children Pay	Editha, their stepmother	
1916	The Americano	Juana de Castalar	
1917	Truthful Tulliver	Grace Burton	
1917	A Woman's Awakening	Cousin Kate	Credited as Alma Rueben Lost film
1917	An Old Fashioned Young Man		Lost film
1917	Master of His Home	Millicent Drake	Credited as Alma Ruben; Lost film
1917	The Cold Deck	Coralie	Incomplete copy exists
1917	The Firefly of Tough Luck	Firefly	Lost film
1917	The Regenerates	Catherine Ten Eyck	Credited as Alma Reuben
1917	The Gown of Destiny	Natalie Drew	
1918	I Love You	Felice	Lost film
1918	The Answer	Lorraine Van Allen	Lost film
1918	The Love Brokers	Charlotte Carter	Lost film
1918	Madame Sphinx	Celeste	Lost film
1918	The Painted Lily	Mary Fanjoy	Lost film
1918	False Ambition	Judith/Zariska	Lost film
1918	The Ghost Flower	Giulia	Lost film
1919	Restless Souls	Marion Gregory	Lost film
1919	Diane of the Green Van	Diane Westfall	Lost film
1919	A Man's Country	Kate Carewe	
1920	Humoresque	Gina Berg (formerly Minnie Ginsberg)	Survives
1920	The World and His Wife	Teodora	Lost film
1920	Thoughtless Women	Annie Marnet	
1922	Find the Woman	Sophie Carey	Incomplete film
1922	The Valley of Silent Men	Marette Radison	Incomplete film
1923	Enemies of Women	Alicia	Incomplete film
1923	Under the Red Robe	Renee de Cocheforet	
1924	Week End Husbands	Barbara Belden	Lost film
1924	The Rejected Woman	Diane Du Prez	
1924	Cytherea	Savina Grove	Lost film
1924	The Price She Paid	Mildred Gower	
1924	Gerald Cranston's Lady	Hermione, Lady Gerald Cranston	Lost film
1924	Is Love Everything?	Virginia Carter	Fragment held at the British Film Institute
1925	The Dancers	Maxine	
1925	She Wolves	Germaine D'Artois	Lost film
1925	A Woman's Faith	Nerée Caron	
1925	Fine Clothes	Paula	Lost film
1925	The Winding Stair	Marguerite	Lost film
1925	East Lynne	Lady Isabel	
1926	The Gilded Butterfly	Linda Haverhill	Lost film
1926	Siberia	Sonia Vronsky	Lost film
1926	Marriage License?	Wanda Heriot	
1927	One Increasing Purpose	Uncredited	Lost film
1927	The Heart of Salome	Helene	Lost film
1928	The Masks of the Devil	Countess Zellner	Lost film
1929	Show Boat	Julie Dozier	
1929	She Goes to War	Rosie	
