= Leona Dalrymple =

American novelist

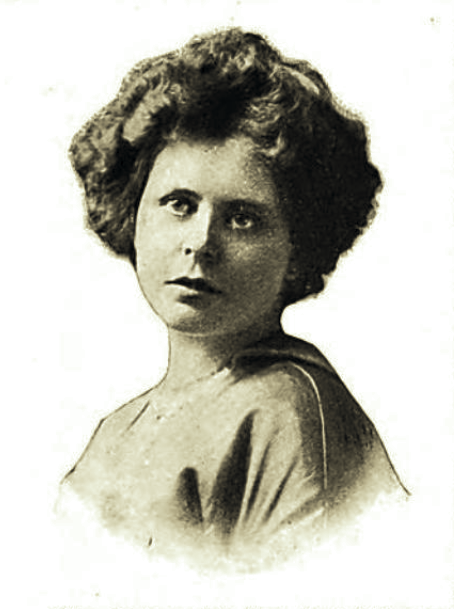
Leona Dalrymple (Scannell's, 1917)

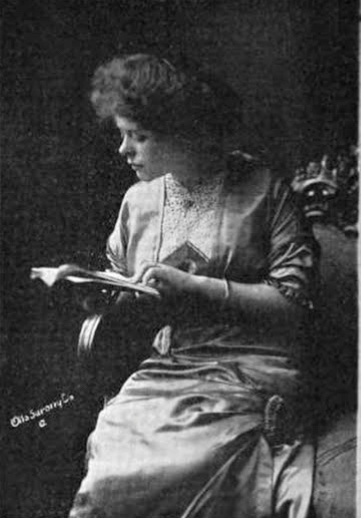
Photo of author Leona Dalrymple, 1914.

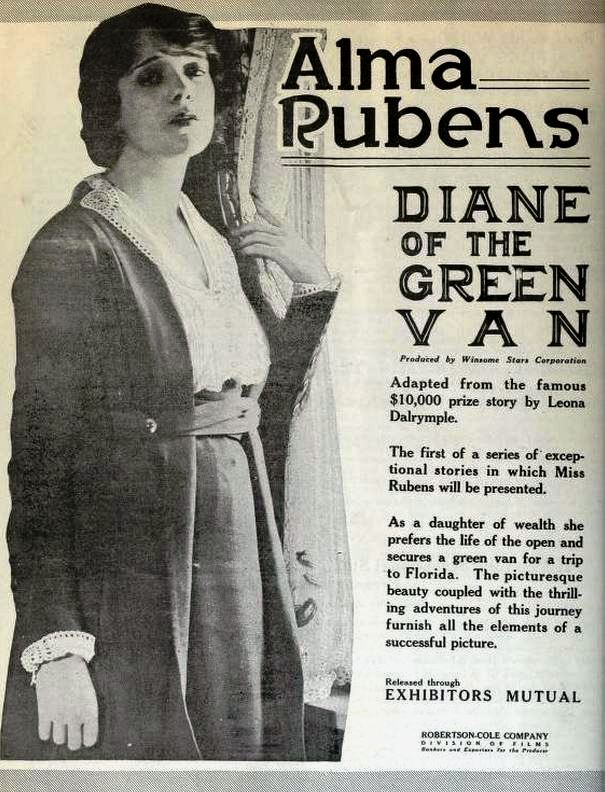
Ad for the movie Diane of the Green Van (1919) based on Leona Dalrymple's novel of the same title.

Leona Dalrymple (1884 – 1968) was an early 20th century American writer of novels, short stories, and plays.

== Biography ==
Leona Dalrymple was on February 11, 1884, in Passaic, New Jersey as the oldest child of New Jersey Assemblyman and former judge George H. Dalrymple and Carrie V. (Dean) Dalrymple. She grew up in Passaic, and graduated from Passaic High School in 1902. On February 7, 1921, she married Clarence Acton Wilson, a lifelong friend, in a Greenwich Village studio apartment ceremony.

Dalrymple's first publication was a play in 1905; the firm that published it later issued another dozen of her works, mostly written for amateur theatricals.

In 1913, Dalrymple won the then very large prize of US$10,000 in a literary competition organized by the publisher Reilly & Britton and judged by Ida Tarbell and S.S. McClure. The winning entry was her romance novel Diane of the Green Van, published the following year. A second entry in the competition that was highly rated by the judges was also by Dalrymple; though slated for publication under the title The Nomad, it apparently was never issued, or at least not under that title.

Diane of the Green Van is a highly improbable Ruritanian romance whose plot involves an heiress who spends a year camping up and down the east coast in a caravan, the intrigues of a European kingdom called Houdania, a missing document, and any number of disguises. A contemporary reviewer wrote that while it was not very original it was romantic and amusing enough to hold the reader's attention. In 1919 it was made into a movie of the same title starring Alma Rubens.

Dalrymple also wrote short stories for magazines like The Bohemian and Ladies' Home Journal.

She died on October 22, 1968, in Stamford, Connecticut.

== Publications ==
=== Novels ===
- Mrs. Forrester's Crusade (1908)
- Träumerei (1912)
- Diane of the Green Van (1914)
- The Lovable Meddler (1915)
- Jimsy, The Christmas Kid (1915)
- When the Yule-Log Burns (1916)
- Kenny (1917)

=== Plays ===
- Tangles: A Farce in One Act (1907)
- While Brother Phil was Walking, a Farce in One Act (1908)

=== Short stories ===
- Uncle Noah's Christmas Inspiration (1912)
- In the Heart of the Christmas Pines (1913)
- Uncle Noah's Christmas Party (1914)
