= John Emerson (filmmaker) =

American film director

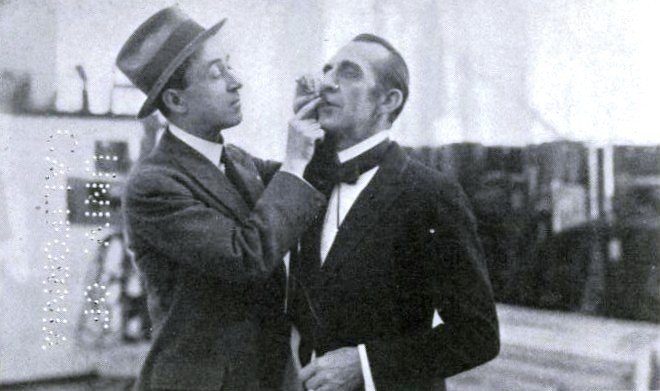
- Emerson gluing a moustache on Frank Stockdale, 1921
- Born: Clifton Paden; May 29, 1874; Sandusky, Ohio, United States
- Died: March 7, 1956 (aged 81); Pasadena, California, United States
- Resting place: Etna Cemetery, Etna, California
- Occupations: Actor, playwright, director, producer, writer
- Spouse: Anita Loos (m. 1919)

2nd President of the Actors' Equity Association
- In office 1919–1928
- Preceded by: Francis Wilson
- Succeeded by: Frank Gillmore

John Emerson (born Clifton Paden; May 29, 1874 – March 7, 1956) was an American stage actor, playwright, producer, and director of silent films (many featuring Douglas Fairbanks). Emerson was married to Anita Loos from June 15, 1919, until his death, and prior to that the couple had worked together as a writing team for motion pictures. They would continue to be credited jointly, even as Loos pursued independent projects.

== Biography ==
Born and educated in Ohio, Emerson's earliest documented acting credits date from 1904, however like D. W. Griffith he probably played in regional stock companies before then. By 1912—the earliest known year for his involvement in film, as a writer—Emerson was working regularly as a director and writer on the Broadway stage. After periods with American Film Manufacturing Company, where he worked with Allan Dwan and Famous Players–Lasky, Emerson collaborated with George Nichols in making Ghosts, a Griffith production made for Reliance-Majestic Studios during the waning days of work on The Birth of a Nation. The result impressed Griffith to such an extent that Emerson stayed on as Reliance-Majestic changed its name to Fine Arts Film Company and came under the Triangle Film Corporation banner.

John Emerson became one Triangle's best-known directors, primarily after the partnership with writer Anita Loos began in 1916; Griffith also valued the pair as being among the best film editors in the business, and they also worked on editing Griffith's massive Intolerance in addition to light, breezy and athletic comedies starring Douglas Fairbanks. Emerson seemed to lose interest in direction around 1919, and afterward worked as a producer and writer, though commonly in projects more readily associated with Loos' taste than his own. Loos wrote extensively, and often disparagingly, of Emerson in her memoirs, but in her early career insisted on maintaining the appearance of partnership with Emerson even if there was none. Emerson's later years were marked by mental illness and long institutionalizations; Loos never divorced him.

Although Anita Loos' memoirs may not paint Emerson in the most flattering of terms, the silent films he directed from 1915 to 1919 were important ones. Most of them survive, including notably The Mystery of the Leaping Fish and The Americano.

Emerson was president of the Actors' Equity Association during its strike against the Producing Managers Association in 1919. The strike began on August 7. At one point he declared, "If the strike is not settled within a month, a cooperative plan will be the outcome. The whole theatre situation of the country will be revolutionized, and the actors will be associated with the authors. The only non-essential element is the manager." The strike ended in early September, establishing Actors Equity as a potent union. Emerson remained its president until 1928.

== Selected filmography ==
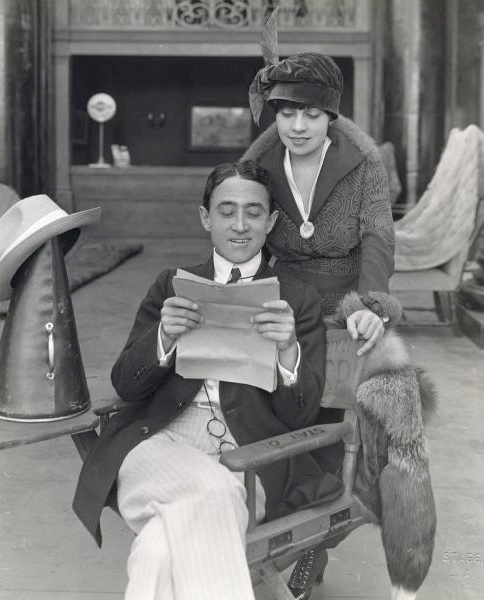
Emerson and Anita Loos examine a script on a film set, 1918.

- Geronimo's Last Raid (1912, writer)
- Ghosts (1915, adaptation of Ibsen's play)
- Old Heidelberg (1915, director)
- The Failure (1915, actor)
- His Picture in the Papers (1916, director)
- The Flying Torpedo (1916, director)
- Macbeth (1916, director)
- The Mystery of the Leaping Fish (1916, director)
- Less Than the Dust (1916, director)
- The Americano (1917, director)
- In Again, Out Again (1917, director)
- Wild and Woolly (1917, director)
- The Isle of Conquest (1919, writer)
- A Virtuous Vamp (1919, writer)
- Search of a Sinner (1920, writer)
- The Perfect Woman (1920, writer)
- Dangerous Business (1920, writer)
- Mama's Affair (1921, writer)
- Woman's Place (1921, scenario)
- Red Hot Romance (1922, writer)
- Dulcy (1923, writer)
- Three Miles Out (1924)
- Camille (1926) (short subject; as guest along with Anita Loos)
- Gentlemen Prefer Blondes (1928, writer)
- The Fall of Eve (1929, story)
- The Struggle (1931, co-scenario with Loos)
- San Francisco (1936, producer)
- Saratoga (1937, producer)
