= Just Out of College =

- Still from the film
- Directed by: Alfred E. Green
- Screenplay by: Arthur F. Statter
- Story by: George Ade
- Based on: Just Out of College by George Ade
- Starring: Jack Pickford; Mary Malone; George Hernandez
- Cinematography: George Webber
- Edited by: Frank E. Hull
- Production company: Goldwyn Pictures
- Distributed by: Goldwyn Pictures
- Release date: November 27, 1920
- Running time: 5 reels
- Country: United States
- Language: Silent (English intertitles)

Just Out of College is a 1920 comedy film directed by Alfred E. Green. It was based on the 1905 play of the same name by George Ade.

== Premise ==
Edward Worthington Swinger plunges the irresponsibility of the ball which terminates his college career into the business world with $20,000 in his pocket. This sum he has resolved to double in 60 days. He has not the ghost of an idea how to do it but he is a typical youth and assumes a cocksure front to camouflage his doubting spirit. If he makes good he gets tine girl who is Caroline Pickering, (Mollie Malone) daughter of Septimus Pickering the pickle king. If he doesn't make good he loses the $20,000 and the girl to boot.

== Cast ==
- Jack Pickford as Ed Swinger
- Molly Malone as Caroline Pickering
- George Hernandez as Saptimus Pickering
- Edythe Chapman as Mrs. Pickering
- Otto Hoffman as Professor Bliss
- Irene Rich as Miss Jones
- Maxfield Stanley as Herbert Poole
- Lefty Flynn as Paul Greer
- Loretta Blake as Genevieve

== Reception ==
A contemporary review in the New York Times wrote that although the film would "pass any board of censors in the country" it was "more immoral than most of the films that would be suppressed.
