= A Little Princess (1917 film) =

1917 film

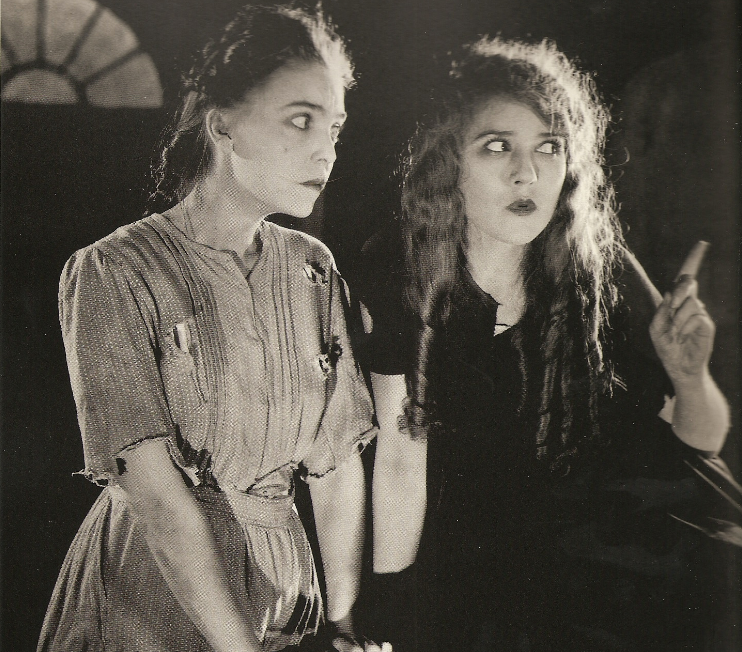
- A scene with ZaSu Pitts and Mary Pickford
- Directed by: Marshall Neilan
- Written by: Frances Marion
- Based on: A Little Princess; 1888 novel by Frances Hodgson Burnett
- Produced by: Mary Pickford
- Starring: Mary Pickford; Norman Kerry; ZaSu Pitts; Theodore Roberts
- Cinematography: Charles Rosher; Walter Stradling
- Distributed by: Artcraft Pictures Corporation
- Release date: November 11, 1917
- Running time: 62 minutes
- Country: United States
- Language: Silent (English intertitles)

The Little Princess

A Little Princess is a 1917 American silent film directed by Marshall Neilan based upon the 1905 novel A Little Princess by Frances Hodgson Burnett. This version is notable for having been adapted by famed screenwriter Frances Marion.

== Plot ==
As described in a film magazine, Sara Crewe is treated as a little princess at the Minchin boarding school for children until it is learned that her father has lost his entire fortune, and she is made a slave (a household servant). She and Becky, another slave, become close friends who share their joys and sorrows. Christmastime draws near and the girls watch the preparations wistfully. Their loneliness arouses the sympathy of a servant of the rich Mr. Carrisford. On the night before Christmas he prepares a spread for the slaveys in their attic. He calls his master Mr. Carrisford to watch their joy, but both are witness to the slaveys being abused and whipped by Miss Minchin. Carrisford interferes and learns that Sara is the daughter of his best friend. He adopts Sara and Becky and in their new home they have a real Christmas.

The film opens with Sarah's father moving back to London after serving in the British Army in India. She is opposed to leaving the luxurious life of an officer's child with a large house and many servants, and is initially shy when enrolled in Miss Minchin's School. Her reputation as "the little princess" precedes her and the other girls are fascinated with her tales of life in India. The girls sneak into Sarah's room at night to listen to her stories. One night, she tells "Ali Baba and the Forty Thieves" which becomes a story within a story with elaborate exotic sets and costumes.

When Miss Minchin is informed that Sara's father has died and lost his fortune, she is stripped of her possessions and accommodations, forced to work as a servant and live in the attic with Becky, the school's existing servant girl. While the other students and Miss Minchin treat Becky poorly, Sara had always been kind and generous and the two become close friends.

Mr. Carrisford is the school's neighbor; his house is so close it is possible to walk across the cornices from his attic window to Sara and Becky's. Mr. Carrisford's Indian servant loses his pet monkey, which escapes to Sara. Upon their meeting he realizes she had spent time in India in a wealthy family and takes pity on her circumstances. While the girls work tirelessly to prepare a Christmas feast for the students and staff, Mr. Carrisford's servant lays out a banquet for Sara and Becky, with an elaborate tablecloth and silver. Miss Minchin discovers this and accuses them of stealing, but are interrupted by Carrisford and his servant crossing the cornice. Carrisford learns Sara's identity and reveals himself to have been her father's best friend, who had persuaded him to invest his fortune in a risky business venture. He died believing he was destitute and had been betrayed by his friend, while Carrisford had been ill and was unable to arrive in time to tell him that the venture was a success. Sara was the heiress to a million pound fortune.

In the final scene, Becky and Sara are invited to live with Mr. Carrisford and they host a Christmas party for a group of poor children. Sara's parents (as ghosts) look on approvingly.

== Cast ==
- Mary Pickford as Sara Crewe
- Katherine Griffith as Miss Minchin
- Norman Kerry as Captain Richard Crewe
- Anne Schaefer as Amelia Minchin
- ZaSu Pitts as Becky
- Gertrude Short as Ermengarde
- Theodore Roberts as Cassim
- Gustav von Seyffertitz as Mr. Carrisford
- Loretta Blake as Lavinia
- George A. McDaniel as Ram Dass
