= His Picture in the Papers =

1916 film directed by John Emerson

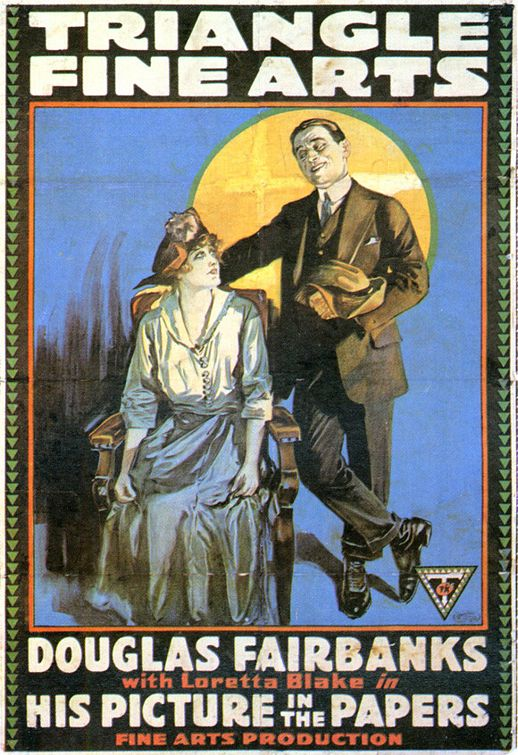
- Film poster
- Directed by: John Emerson
- Written by: John Emerson; Anita Loos
- Starring: Douglas Fairbanks; Loretta Blake
- Cinematography: George W. Hill
- Production company: Fine Arts Picture Company
- Distributed by: Triangle Film Corporation
- Release date: February 13, 1916
- Running time: 62 minutes
- Country: United States
- Language: Silent (English intertitles)
- Budget: $42,599.94

His Picture in the Papers is a 1916 American silent comedy film written and directed by John Emerson. Anita Loos also wrote the film's scenario. The film stars Douglas Fairbanks and Loretta Blake and features Erich von Stroheim in a minor role.

== Plot ==
Watch His Picture in the Papers

Pete Prindle, son of Proteus, is a vegetarian health food manufacturer who wishes to marry Christine Cadwalader. She agrees. However, Proteus considers his son lazy, with no contributions to the company and therefore undeserving of his father's wealth. His daughters have their pictures in the newspapers, pictures of them promoting the company products. Cassius refuses to consent to his daughter's hand since he believes Pete to be lazy as well, with no real stake in his father's company. Pete tries hard to get in the newspaper: He fakes a car accident, which gets an insignificant mention in the paper. He wins a boxing match, which turns out to be an illegally run ring which ends up being raided by police.

After a misunderstanding, he washes up on the shore in his pajamas after falling off a cruise ship, and proceeds to beat two police officers, his name is withheld by the newspaper. Finally, he saves many people on a train from a group of thugs intent on murdering Cassius by preventing a collision with another rail car. He receives a front-page article in every major local newspaper and a large photo as well which pleases everyone.

== Cast ==
- Douglas Fairbanks as Pete Prindle
- Clarence Handyside as Proteus Prindle
- Rene Boucicault as Pansy Prindle
- Jean Temple as Pearl Prindle
- Charles Butler as Cassius Cadwalader
- Loretta Blake as Christine Cadwalader
- Homer Hunt as Melville
- Helena Rupport as Olga
- Erich von Stroheim as 'Eye Patch' Thug

== Production notes ==
The film was produced by Fine Arts Film Company for $42,599.94, and distributed by the Triangle Film Corporation. Portions of the film were shot at the Willat-Triangle Studio in Fort Lee, New Jersey. Other sequences were shot in Yonkers and Atlantic City. A boxing scene featured in the film was shot at Sharkey's Athletic Club, a boxing club, on Columbus Avenue in Manhattan.

This was the first Fairbanks film with a Loos scenario, and an early example of her intertitle style involving self-parady, sarcasm, slang, and puns. For example, one title card near the end, referring to the character Pete, said "Ain't he the REEL hero?" The titles of the film were well received and Fairbanks signed a contract to have Loos do the intertitles for his next films.

== Preservation status ==
Prints of His Picture in the Papers are preserved in the Library of Congress, George Eastman House Motion Picture Collection, and other archives. It was also released on DVD by Flicker Alley.
