= Ghosts (1915 film) =

1915 film by John Emerson, George Nichols

- Directed by: George Nichols
- Written by: Russell E. Smith
- Based on: Ghosts by Henrik Ibsen
- Produced by: D. W. Griffith
- Distributed by: Mutual Film Company
- Release date: June 1915
- Running time: 49 minutes
- Country: USA
- Language: Silent..English titles

Ghosts is a 1915 silent film drama based on the famous 1881 play Ghosts by Henrik Ibsen. It was directed by George Nichols. D. W. Griffith produced the film and Erich von Stroheim served in several capacities as technical advisor, wardrobe assistant and costume designer. George Siegmann was an assistant director. The film had the alternate or working titles The Wreck, The Inherited Burden and The Curse.

The play Gengangere was first performed in America in 1894.

A copy is preserved in the Library of Congress collection. Copies are also held at the George Eastman Museum and UCLA Film & Television Archive.

== Cast ==
- Henry B. Walthall - Captain Arling / Oswald
- Mary Alden - Helen Arling, wife of captain Arling and mother of Oswald
- Loretta Blake - Regina
- Carl Formes – Henrik Ibsen
- Al W. Filson – Doctor
- Juanita Archer – Johanna, mother of Regina
- Thomas Jefferson – Her husband, putative father of Regina
- Nigel de Brulier – pastor Manders (credited as Nigel de Bruiller)
