= Harvey Breit =

American dramatist

- Born: 1909
- Died: April 9, 1968 (aged 58–59); New York City
- Years active: 1943-1957
- Employer: The New York Times
- Known for: The New York Times book reviews
- Spouses: Alice S. Morris, Patricia Rinehart

Harvey Breit (1909 - April 9, 1968) was an American poet, editor, and playwright as well as reviewer for The New York Times Book Review from 1943 to 1957.

== Career ==
Breit began his writing career at Time, where he worked from 1933 to 1934.

He wrote for the New York Times including the New York Times Book Review from 1948 to 1957.

In 1951, writer Anita Loos told him in an interview about her new book, A Mouse Is Born:

I'm the oldest motion picture writer in the business. I am endlessly grateful to the movies, and I'll tell you why. Because a writer can always make a living writing for the movies when he hasn't anything to say. If it hadn't been for the movies, I would have had to turn out novels when I had nothing to say ... You can do a good job on other people's material ... The movies help writers over their bad periods.

In 1952, he interviewed Whittaker Chambers at the publication of his memoir Witness:

From the casual talk, he went on to a point that one heard raised a good deal. The question of Mr. Chambers' memory. He remembered so many things and he had failed to remember a number of other things.

"That's always baffled me," he said In a slow and measured tempo. "There doesn't seem to be any consistency in the importance of what is remembered. One recalls a shadow on a wall, a gesture, something of no great importance, remembers it for years--and then forgets some extremely important fact like the address of one of the underground photographic laboratories. I suppose only a student of memory could give you the answer and then I wouldn't be particularly impressed. Memory is like a hot coal-it fades and grows bright again and fades."

In 1955, he interviewed William Faulkner after his National Book Award best fiction (A Fable).

He was one of the last people to talk to poet Dylan Thomas before his death:

That week Thomas called an old friend and said: "I'm tired of all the goddam writers around here. Why don't you give me a party with no writers, only beautiful women?" Late that Saturday night, after the party, Thomas showed up at his favorite tavern, the White Horse, a dark-paneled, homey bar on the western outskirts of Greenwich Village. His eyes were glazed, bloodshot, heavy-lidded. Some pals bought him drinks, and he downed three or four boilermakers in 15 minutes. Later, he went on to another bar, then retired to his hotel room for a warm beer and whisky nightcap with a friend. Three days and several parties later, New York Times Critic Harvey Breit telephoned him at his hotel. "He seemed bad," Breit recalls. "I wanted to say, 'You sound as though from the tomb.' I didn't.

He lectured at Sarah Lawrence College.

Breit adapted several novels for the stage, including Budd Schulberg's The Disenchanted and R. K. Narayan's The Guide.

He also edited the letters of novelist Malcolm Lowry (The Selected Letters of Malcolm Lowry, Lippincott, 1965) with Lowry's wife Margerie Bonner.

=== The Disenchanted ===
He co-wrote the play The Disenchanted with Budd Schulberg, adapting it from Schulberg's novel of the same name about the life of F. Scott Fitzgerald. The play was nominated for a Tony Award for Best Play in 1959. It starred Jason Robards, who won a Tony Award for his performance.

=== The Guide ===
With second wife Patricia Rinehart, he adapted R. K. Narayan's novel The Guide for Broadway.

In 1968, Time magazine reported:

On Broadway The Guide is a showcase for Pakistani Actor Zia Mohyeddin, who gives an electric performance as a jailbird mistaken for a holy man by the people of an Indian village. He is having a ball, until a drought and a misunderstanding force him into a real Gandhi-type fast. The play itself, adapted by Harvey Breit and Patricia Rinehart from a novel by R. K. Narayan, is disappointingly thin in emotion and thick in talk.

== Personal ==
=== Marriages ===
Breit was married first to writer and editor Alice S. Morris and then in 1955 to poet and playwright Patricia Rinehart.

=== Death ===
Breit died on April 9, 1968, in his New York City apartment.

=== Correspondence ===
Breit's letters at Northwestern University include correspondence with Brooks Atkinson, W.H. Auden, Jacques Barzun, Ludwig Bemelmans, Margaret Bourke-White, Erskine Caldwell, Whittaker Chambers, Madge Evans, Dudley Fitts, Arthur Kober, Anne Morrow Lindbergh, Harold Rome, Budd Schulberg, Lionel Trilling, and Glenway Westcott.

== Publications ==
- Two Robert Nathan pieces (1950). "A Talk with Robert Nathan" by Harvey Breit and "Advice to My Son", a poem by Robert Nathan
- This Thing Called Love (1955), a collection of stories edited by Mark Slonim and Harvey Breit
- The Writer Observed (1956), a collection of interviews
- The Disenchanted (1959), a play by Budd Schulberg and Harvey Breit. Based on the novel by Budd Schulberg
- A Narrow Action (1964), a novel
- The Selected Letters of Malcolm Lowry (1965), edited by Harvey Breit and Margerie Bonner Lowry
