= Thomas V. Jones =

American businessman

- Born: Thomas Victor Jones; July 21, 1920; Pomona, California, US
- Died: January 7, 2014 (aged 93); Los Angeles, California, US
- Education: Stanford University
- Employers: Douglas Aircraft Company (1942-1947); Brazilian Air Ministry (1947-1951); Northrop Corporation (1953-1989)
- Board member of: RAND Corporation (~1953)
- Spouse: Ruth Jones
- Children: 2
- Awards: Reed Aeronautics Award (1985); Wright Brothers Memorial Trophy (1989); National Aviation Hall of Fame (1999)

Thomas Victor Jones (July 21, 1920 – January 7, 2014) was an American businessman. He served as the chairman and chief executive officer of Northrop Corporation.

== Biography ==
=== Early life ===
Born in Pomona, California, he graduated magna cum laude in engineering from Stanford University.

=== Career ===
He went to work at Douglas Aircraft Company in 1942. He worked for the Brazilian Air Ministry to create the Aeronautical Institute of Technology from 1947 to 1951. Around 1953 he went to work for the RAND Corporation where he published a study on transport planes for the U.S. Air Force. That same year he joined Northrop as assistant to the chief engineer, rose to be the president in 1959, chief executive officer in 1960 and chairman of the board in 1963.

He was on the cover of Time magazine on October 27, 1961. He received the AIAA "Reed Aeronautics Award" in 1985 and the Wright Brothers Memorial Trophy of the National Aeronautic Association in 1989. He was inducted into the National Aviation Hall of Fame in 1999.

In May 1974 he pled guilty to making illegal corporate donations to the Committee to Re-elect the President and resigned from many of his non-Northrop positions including trustee of Stanford University. He retired as chief executive of Northrop in 1989 after being reprimanded by the board of directors for his role in a bribery scandal surrounding the marketing the F-20 fighter to South Korea.

=== Personal life ===
He was married to Ruth Jones, who died in July 2013. They had two children, Peter Thomas and Ruth Marilyn. In 1959, Jones and his wife purchased Moraga Estate in Bel Air, Los Angeles, formerly owned by film director Victor Fleming (1889-1949). They turned the estate into a vineyard, by planting a terraced vineyard in 1978. In 2013, it was purchased by Rupert Murdoch, chairman and chief executive officer of the News Corporation, after he saw an advertisement in a newspaper he owns, The Wall Street Journal.

On January 7, 2014, Thomas V. Jones died of pulmonary fibrosis at his home in Los Angeles. He was 93.
