= Macbeth (1916 film) =

1916 film directed by John Emerson

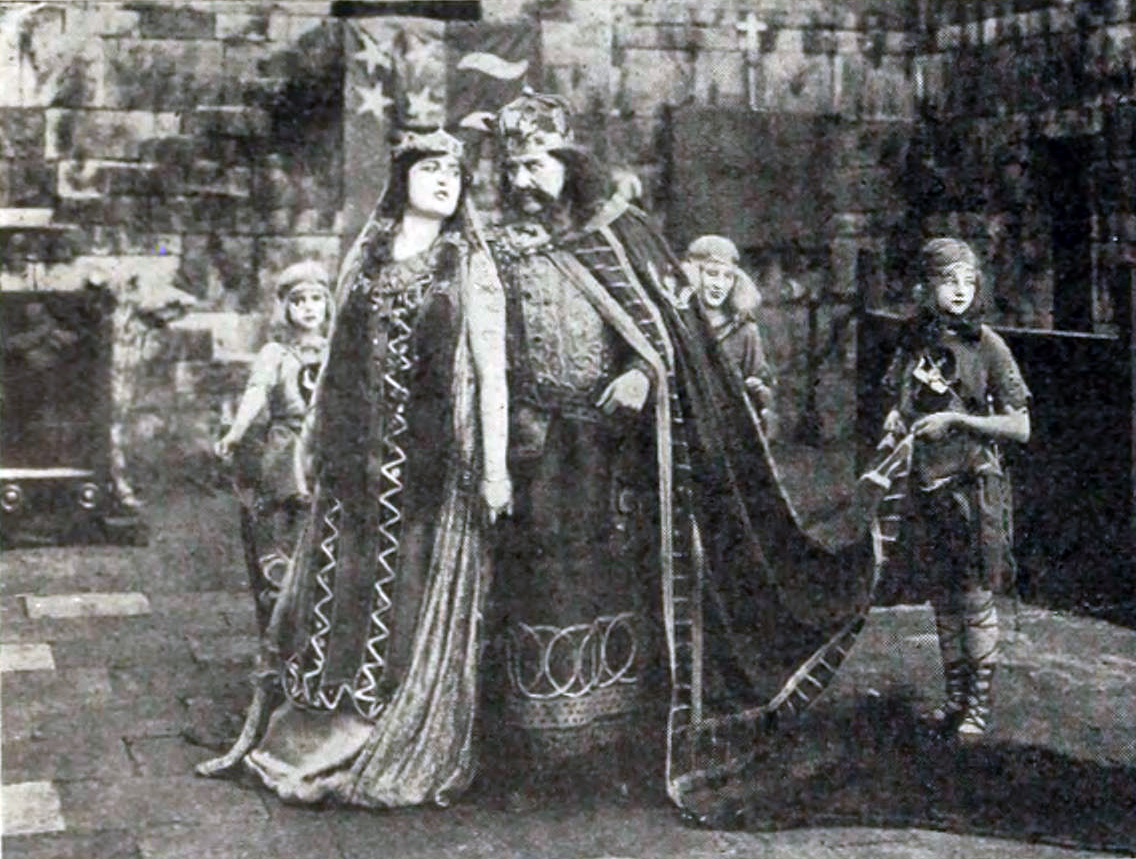
- Directed by: John Emerson
- Written by: John Emerson (scenario); Anita Loos (intertitles)
- Story by: William Shakespeare
- Based on: Macbeth (play)
- Produced by: D. W. Griffith
- Starring: Herbert Beerbohm Tree; Constance Collier
- Cinematography: Victor Fleming; George W. Hill
- Distributed by: Triangle Film Corporation
- Release date: June 4, 1916 (United States)
- Running time: 8 reels (~7500 feet)
- Country: United States
- Language: Silent film (English intertitles)

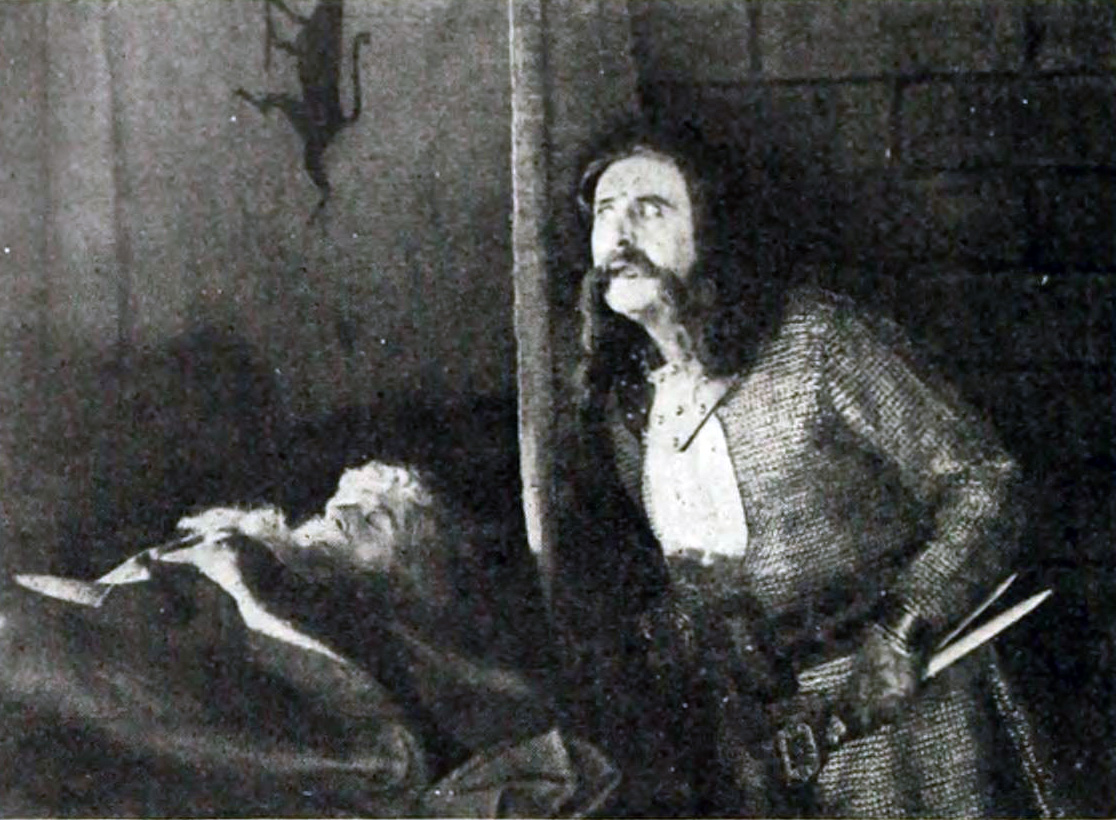
Herbert Beerbohm Tree as Macbeth

Macbeth is a silent, black-and-white 1916 film adaptation of the William Shakespeare play Macbeth. It was directed by John Emerson, assisted by Erich von Stroheim, and produced by D. W. Griffith, with cinematography by Victor Fleming. The film starred Herbert Beerbohm Tree and Constance Collier, both famous from the stage and for playing Shakespearean parts. Although released during the first decade of feature filmmaking, it was already the seventh version of Macbeth to be produced, one of eight during the silent film era. Although 1916 was the middle of WW1, this film was part of numerous festivities to commemorate the 300th anniversary of Shakespeare's death. It is considered to be a lost film.

In the companion book to his Hollywood television series, Kevin Brownlow states that Sir Herbert failed to understand that the production was a silent film and that speech was not needed so much as pantomime. Tree, who had performed the play numerous times on the stage, kept spouting reams of dialogue. So Emerson and Fleming simply removed the film and cranked an empty camera so as not to waste film when he did so.

== Cast ==
- Sir Herbert Beerbohm Tree as Macbeth
- Constance Collier as Lady Macbeth
- Wilfred Lucas as Macduff
- Spottiswoode Aitken as Duncan
- Ralph Lewis as Banquo
- Mary Alden as Lady Macduff
- Olga Grey as Lady Agnes
- Lawrence Noskowski as Malcolm
- Bessie Buskirk as Donalbain
- Jack Conway as Lennox
- Seymour Hastings as Ross
- Karl Formes Jr. as the Bishop
- Jack Brammall as Seyton
- L. Tylden as First Witch
- Scott McKee as Second Witch
- Jack Leonard as Third Witch
- Francis Carpenter, Thema Burns and Madge Dyer as Macduff's children
- Raymond Wells as the Thane of Cawdor
- George McKenzie as the Doctor
- Chandler House as Fleance
- Monte Blue (Stunt double for Herbert Tree)
