= Adventure (1925 film) =

1925 film by Victor Fleming

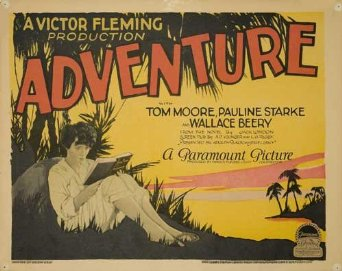
- Theatrical poster
- Directed by: Victor Fleming
- Written by: Gordon Rigby; A.P. Younger
- Based on: Adventure; 1911 novel by Jack London
- Produced by: Adolph Zukor; Jesse Lasky; Victor Fleming
- Starring: Tom Moore; Pauline Starke; Wallace Beery
- Cinematography: Charles Schoenbaum (as C. Edgar Schoenbaum)
- Distributed by: Paramount Pictures
- Release date: April 14, 1925
- Running time: 7 reels (6,713 feet)
- Country: United States
- Language: Silent (English intertitles)

Adventure is a lost 1925 American silent drama film produced by Famous Players–Lasky, distributed by Paramount Pictures, directed by Victor Fleming. It features Wallace Beery in a major supporting role.

The film Adventure is based on Jack London's 1911 novel Adventure.

== Plot ==
David Sheldon is the owner of a plantation in the Solomon Islands. He become debilitated during a blackwater fever epidemic. At that time Joan Lackland, a female mercenary, arrives by schooner in the islands. Enlisting the aid of her Kanaka crew, she defends Sheldon from an attack by the Solomon Islanders, led by their chief, Googomy.

Joan becomes David's business partner after nursing him back to health. She prevents his two unscrupulous lenders trom gaining control of the plantation. In retaliation, the lenders incite the natives to revolt against David.

== Cast ==
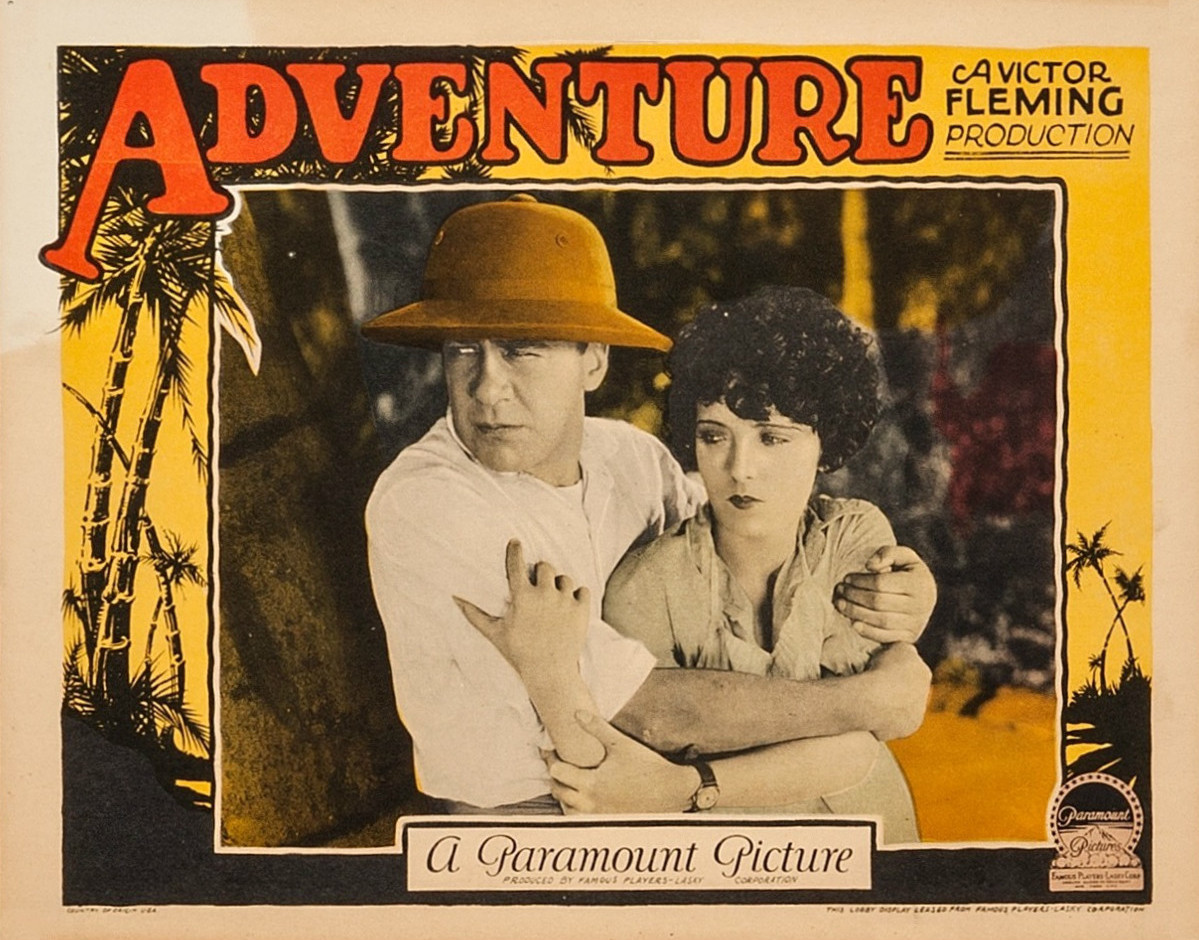
Tom Moore and Pauline Starke

- Tom Moore as David Sheldon
- Pauline Starke as Joan Lackland
- Wallace Beery as Morgan
- Raymond Hatton as Raff
- Walter McGrail as Tudor
- Duke Kahanamoku as Noah Noa
- James Spencer as Adam
- Noble Johnson as Googomy

== Preservation ==
With no holdings located in archives, Adventure is considered a lost film.
