= The Fatal Glass of Beer =

The Fatal Glass of Beer can refer to the following:

- The Fatal Glass of Beer (1916 film), a 1916 film directed by Tod Browning
- The Fatal Glass of Beer (1933 film), a 1933 film produced by Mack Sennett and starring W. C. Fields
