= A Virtuous Vamp =

1919 film by Sidney Franklin, David Kirkland

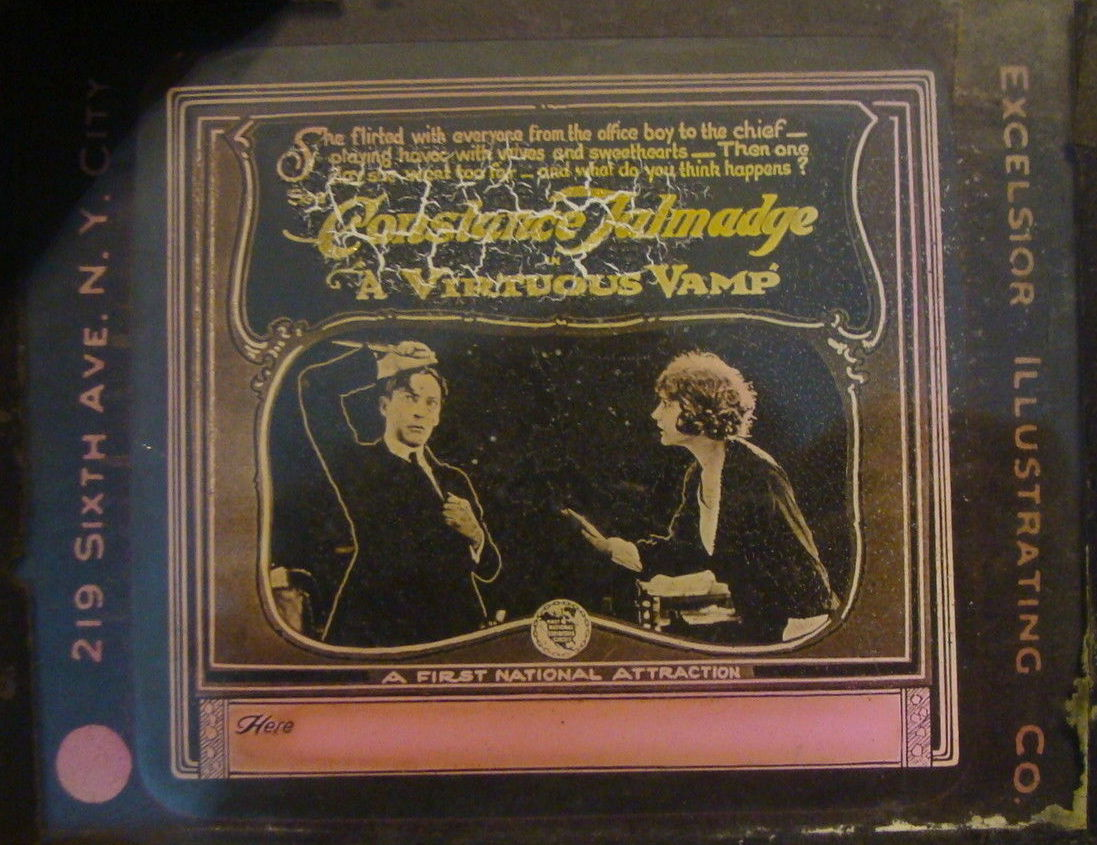
- Lantern slide
- Directed by: David Kirkland; Sidney Franklin
- Written by: Anita Loos; John Emerson
- Based on: The Bachelor by Clyde Fitch
- Produced by: Joseph M. Schenck; Constance Talmadge; Anita Loos; John Emerson
- Starring: Constance Talmadge; Conway Tearle; Ned Sparks
- Cinematography: Oliver T. Marsh
- Production company: Constance Talmadge Film Company
- Distributed by: First National Exhibitors' Circuit
- Release date: November 16, 1919
- Running time: 5 reels
- Country: United States
- Language: Silent (English intertitles)

A Virtuous Vamp is a 1919 American silent comedy film produced by and starring Constance Talmadge that was directed by David Kirkland and Sidney Franklin. It was written by Anita Loos and John Emerson based on the 1909 play The Bachelor by Clyde Fitch.

On December 18, 2013, the Library of Congress announced that the film had been selected for preservation in the National Film Registry for being "culturally, historically, or aesthetically significant".

== Cast ==
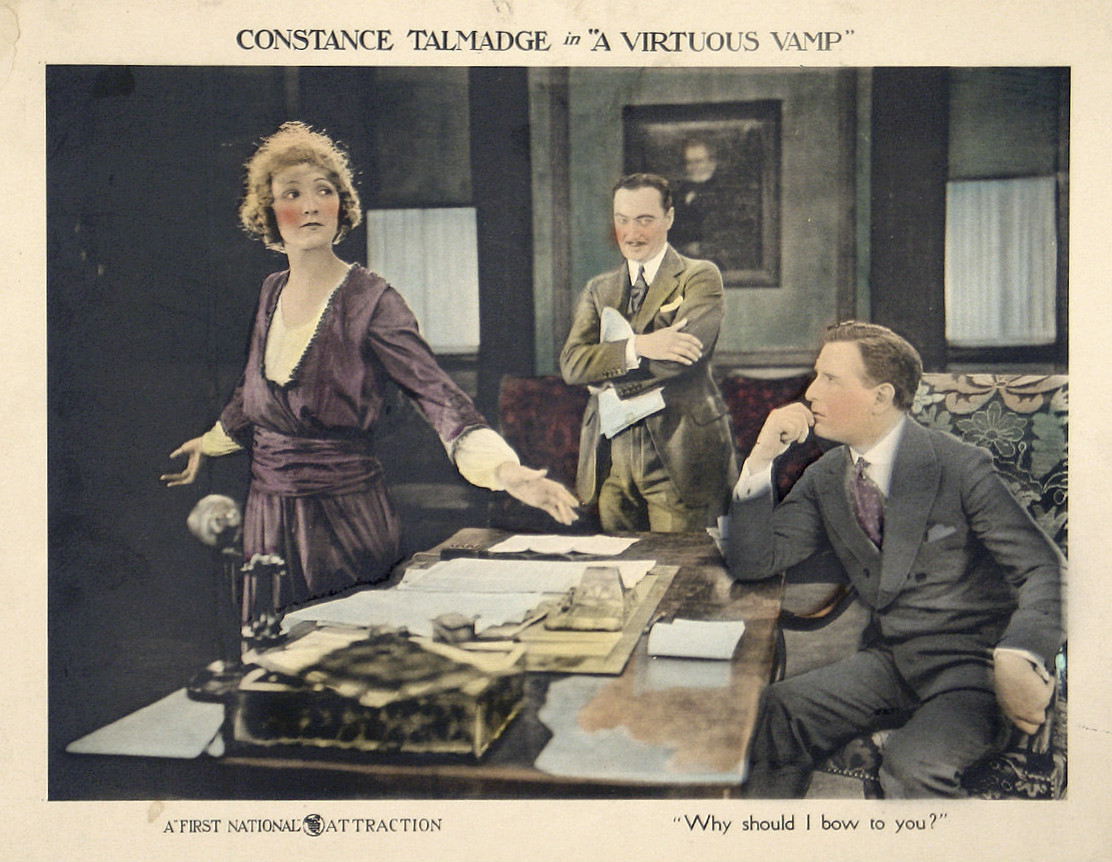
Lobby card

- Constance Talmadge as Gwendolyn Armitage/Nellie Jones
- Belle Daube as Mrs. Armitage
- Jack Kane as Edward Cecil Armitage
- Conway Tearle as James Crowninshield
- Jeanette Horton as Katherine Crowninshield
- Margaret Linden as Minerva Crowninshield
- Wallace McCutcheon Jr. as Kirby
- Ned Sparks as Mr. Bell
- William Eville as Mr. Hicks
- William Gaunt as Mr. Davis
- Gilda Gray in Bit Part

== See also ==
- National Film Preservation Foundation
