= The Fatal Glass of Beer (1916 film) =

1916 film

The Fatal Glass of Beer (aka:The Deadly Glass of Beer)
- Directed by: Tod Browning
- Written by: Anita Loos
- Produced by: Fine Arts Film Company
- Starring: Jack Brammall; Elmo Lincoln
- Distributed by: Triangle Film Corporation
- Release date: October 1916
- Running time: 2 reels
- Country: United States
- Languages: Silent; English intertitles

The Fatal Glass of Beer is a 1916 American short comedy film directed by Tod Browning.

== Cast ==
- Jack Brammall as John
- Elmo Lincoln
- Tully Marshall as Cousin Henry
- Teddy Sampson as Nell
