= Jack Brammall =

- Born: John George Brammall; October 15, 1879; Newcastle-upon-Tyne, England
- Occupation: Actor
- Years active: 1912–1921

Jack Brammall, born John George Brammall, was an English-born American actor on stage and screen.

In 1909 he was in a Shubert production.

Brammal joined David Miles at the Kinemacolor Company of America in 1912. Also in 1912 he was part of The Screen Club. He attended a Screen Club party in 1913.

== Filmography ==
=== Actor ===
- A Case of Beans (1916)
- Macbeth (1916)
- The Wharf Rat (1916)
- The Fatal Glass of Beer (1916)
- Puppets (1916)
- The House Built Upon Sand (1916)
- A Love Sublime (1917)
- Six Feet Four (1919)
- Rose o' the River (1919)
- The Master Man (1919)
- Terror Island (1920), a film starring Harry Houdini
- The Skywayman (1920)
- The Cheater Reformed (1921)
- Play Square (1921)
