= A Love Sublime =

1917 film

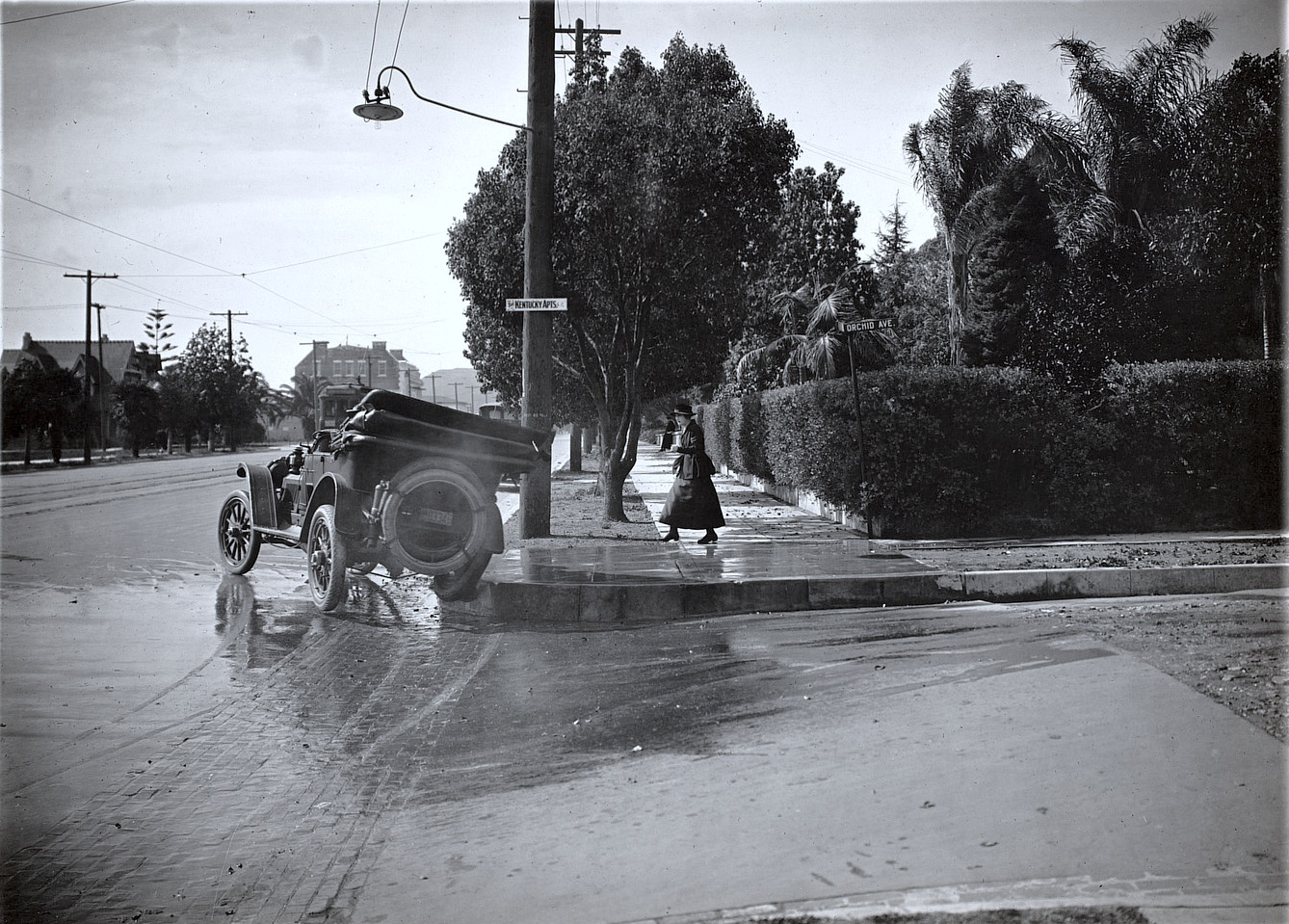
- Directed by: Tod Browning; Wilfred Lucas
- Written by: Samuel Hopkins Adams; Tod Browning; Wilfred Lucas
- Starring: Wilfred Lucas; Carmel Myers
- Distributed by: Triangle Distributing
- Release date: March 11, 1917
- Country: United States
- Languages: Silent; English intertitles

A Love Sublime (also known as Orpheus) is a 1917 American drama film directed by Tod Browning.

== Cast ==
- Wilfred Lucas - Philip
- Carmel Myers - Toinette
- F. A. Turner - The Professor (as Fred A. Turner)
- Alice Wilson - The Sculptress (as Alice Rae)
- George Beranger - Her Husband
- Jack Brammall - Piney the Rat
- James O'Shea - Policeman
- Bert Woodruff - The Little Red Doctor
- Mildred Harris - Eurydice
