= The House Built Upon Sand =

1916 films

- Directed by: Edward Morrissey
- Written by: Mary H. O'Connor
- Produced by: Fine Arts Film Company
- Starring: Lillian Gish
- Cinematography: Philip R. Du Bois
- Distributed by: Triangle Film Corporation
- Release date: December 31, 1916
- Running time: 50 minutes
- Country: United States
- Languages: Silent; English intertitles

The House Built Upon Sand is a 1916 American drama film directed by Edward Morrissey and starring Lillian Gish. This is a lost film.

== Cast ==
- Lillian Gish as Evelyn Dare
- Roy Stewart as David Westebrooke
- William H. Brown as Samuel Stevens
- Bessie Buskirk as Josie
- Jack Brammall as Ted
- Josephine Crowell as Mrs. Shockley
- Kate Bruce as David's Housekeeper

== See also ==
- Lillian Gish filmography
