= Patricia Rinehart =

American poet

Patricia Rinehart (1930–1996) was an American poet and playwright.

== Life ==
Her father Alan Rinehart, was a writer and producer and was son of the mystery writer, Mary Roberts Rinehart. Her mother was Gratia Buell Houghton Rinehart, daughter of Arthur Amory Houghton, co-owner of the Corning Glass Company, and niece of businessman, politician, and diplomat Alanson B. Houghton. In 1948, Rinehart graduated from the Graham-Eckes School, Palm Beach, Florida, and in December of that year, she made her debut at the New York home of her uncle and aunt, Mr. and Mrs. Arthur Amory Houghton, Jr. In 1949, she married Dr. Robert Jean Campbell III. Following her divorce from Dr. Campbell, she married Harvey Breit in 1955. With Breit she adapted R. K. Narayan's novel The Guide for Broadway. The Guide opened at the Hudson Theatre in 1968, but closed after just five performances. The play, writes Professor of Theatre Arts Thomas S. Hischak, "was too foreign for Broadway critics and playgoers." In 1973, Rinehart married the conservationist Hilary Barratt-Brown. Her poetry collection Against the Loss of Night: Poems was published in 1986.
