= Double or Nothing (1936 film) =

1936 film

- Directed by: Joseph Henabery
- Produced by: Samuel Sax
- Starring: Phil Harris
- Music by: David Mendoza
- Distributed by: Warner Bros.
- Release date: January 18, 1936
- Running time: 21 minutes
- Country: United States
- Language: English

Double or Nothing is a 1936 American short musical comedy film directed by Joseph Henabery. It was nominated for an Academy Award at the 9th Academy Awards in 1936 for Best Short Subject (Two-Reel). The Academy Film Archive preserved Double or Nothing in 2013.

== Cast ==
- Phil Harris
- Leah Ray
- Harry Tyler
- Vicki Joyce
- Johnny Boyle
