= Pauline Starke =

American actress (1901–1977)

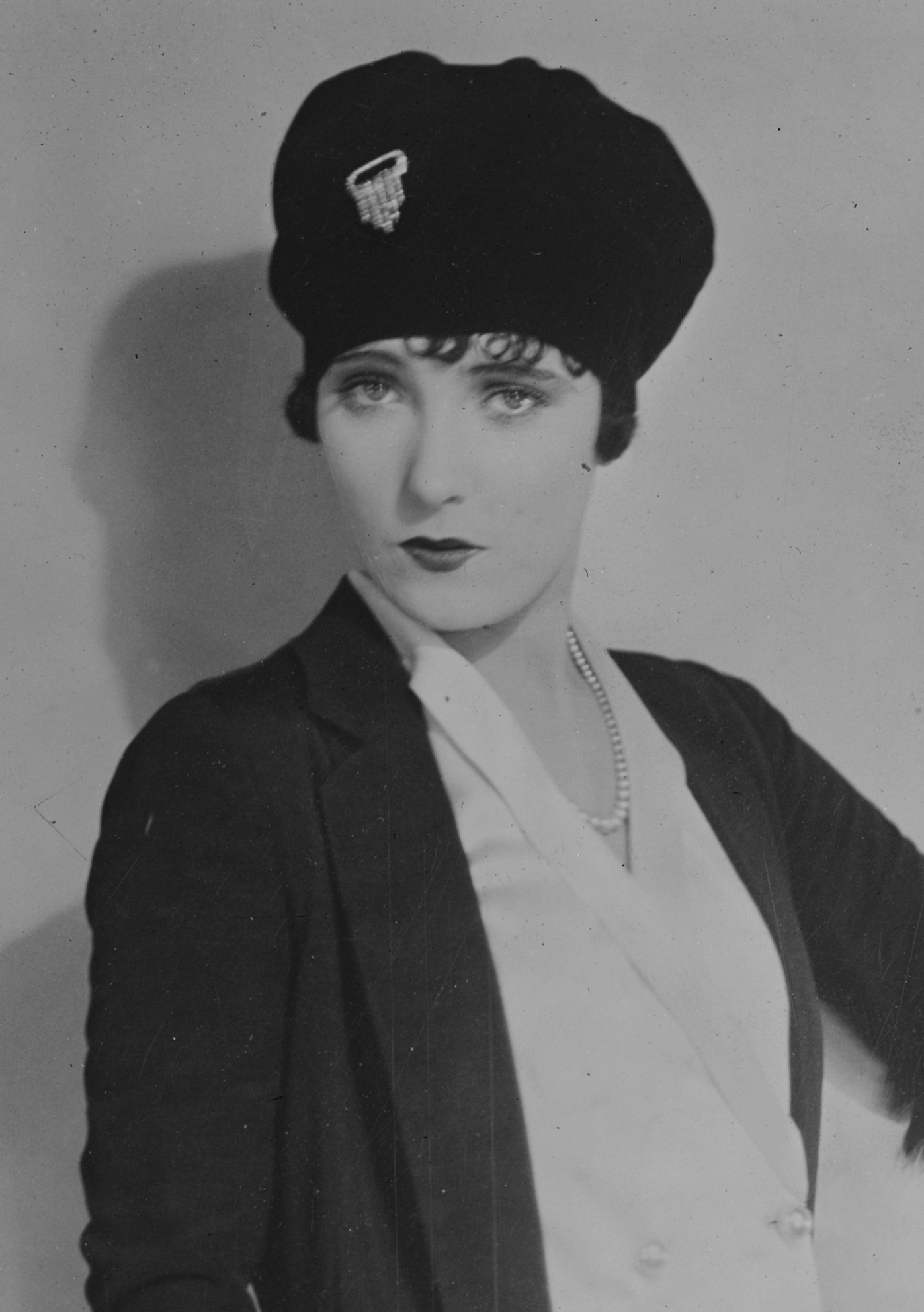
- Starke in 1927
- Born: January 10, 1901; Joplin, Missouri, U.S.
- Died: February 3, 1977 (aged 76); Santa Monica, California, U.S.
- Occupation: Actress
- Years active: 1916–1935
- Spouses: Jack White (m. 1927; div. 1931) George Sherwood (m. 1932)

Pauline Starke (January 10, 1901 (Note: Some sources say she was born in 1900.) – February 3, 1977) was an American silent-film actress.

== Early years ==
Pauline Starke was born on January 10, 1901, in Joplin, Missouri, the daughter of George W. Starke and Edythe Edna Starke (née Bruce). Starke left school after completing the 5th grade. She accompanied her mother to Los Angeles and caught the attention of D. W. Griffith while her mother was working as an extra.

== Career ==
Selected as one of the WAMPAS Baby Stars in 1922, Starke starred in a number of films from 1916 to 1935.

She made her acting debut as an extra in The Birth of a Nation (1915) and appeared as a dance extra in Intolerance (1916). She continued to play bit parts until director Frank Borzage started casting her in leading roles, beginning in 1917. She scored several lead roles in films, establishing her as a prominent silent-film actress during the 1920s.

On Broadway, Starke portrayed Sylvia Clayton in Zombie (1932).

== Personal life and death ==
Starke married producer/director Jack White on September 4, 1927, and they divorced in 1931. In 1932, she married actor George Sherwood.

Starke died from the aftermath of a stroke on February 3, 1977, in Santa Monica, California.

== Recognition ==
Starke has a star on the Hollywood Walk of Fame, at 6125 Hollywood Blvd, for her contributions to Motion Pictures.

== Selected filmography ==
- Intolerance (1916) - Favorite of the Harem (uncredited)
- Puppets (1916, Short) - Columbine
- The Rummy (1916) - The Girl
- The Wharf Rat (1916) - Flo
- Cheerful Givers (1917) - Abigail Deady
- Madame Bo-Peep (1917) - Juanita
- The Regenerates (1917) - Nora Duffy
- Until They Get Me (1917) - Margy
- The Argument (1918) - Wyllis Hyde
- The Shoes That Danced (1918) - Rhoda Regan
- Innocent's Progress (1918) - Tessa Fayne
- The Man Who Woke Up (1918) - Edith Oglesby
- Alias Mary Brown (1918) - Betty
- Daughter Angele (1918) - Angele
- The Atom (1918) - Jenny
- Irish Eyes (1918) - Pegeen O'Barry
- Whom the Gods Would Destroy (1919) - Julie
- The Life Line (1919) - Ruth Heckett
- Eyes of Youth (1919) - Rita Ashling
- The Broken Butterfly (1919) - Marcene Elliot
- Soldiers of Fortune (1919) - Hope Langham
- The Little Shepherd of Kingdom Come (1920, Lost film) - Melissa
- Dangerous Days (1920) - Delight Haverford
- The Courage of Marge O'Doone (1920, Lost film) - Marge O'Doone
- Seeds of Vengeance (1920) - Ellen Daw
- The Untamed (1920) - Kate Cumberland
- A Connecticut Yankee in King Arthur's Court (1921, Incomplete, only reels 2, 4, and 7 exist) - Sandy
- Snowblind (1921) - The Girl
- Salvation Nell (1921) - Nell Sanders
- The Forgotten Woman (1921) - Dixie LaRose
- Wife Against Wife (1921) - Gabrielle Gautier
- Flower of the North (1921) - Jeanne D'Arcambal
- My Wild Irish Rose (1922, Lost film) - Moya
- If You Believe It, It's So (1922, Lost film) - Alvah Morley
- The Kingdom Within (1922) - Emily Preston
- Lost and Found on a South Sea Island (1923) - Lorna
- Little Church Around the Corner (1923) - Hetty Burrows
- The Little Girl Next Door (1923) - Mary Slocum
- His Last Race (1923) - Denny's Wife
- In the Palace of the King (1923) - Inez Mendoza
- Eyes of the Forest (1923) - Ruth Melier
- Arizona Express (1924) - Katherine Keith
- Missing Daughters (1924) - Pauine Hinton
- Dante's Inferno (1924) - The Nurse - Marjorie Vernon
- Hearts of Oak (1924, Lost film) - Chrystal
- Forbidden Paradise (1924) - Anna
- Adventure (1925, Lost film) - Joan Lackland
- The Devil's Cargo (1925) - Far Sampson
- The Man Without a Country (1925) - Anne Bissell
- Sun-Up (1925) - Emmy
- Bright Lights (1925, Lost, only the trailer exists) - Patsy Delaney
- War Paint (1926, Lost, only the trailer exists) - Polly Hopkins
- Love's Blindness (1926, Lost, only a fragment exists) - Vanessa Levy
- Camille (1926, Short) - Nan
- Honesty – The Best Policy (1926) - Mary Kay
- Women Love Diamonds (1927) - Mavis Ray
- Captain Salvation (1927) - Bess Morgan
- Dance Magic (1927) - Johala Chandler
- Streets of Shanghai (1927) - Mary Sanger
- The Perfect Sap (1927) as Polly Stoddard
- The Viking (1928) - Helga Nilsson
- Man, Woman and Wife (1929) - Julia / Rita
- The Mysterious Island (1929)
- A Royal Romance (1930) - Countess von Baden
- What Men Want (1930) - Lee Joyce
- $20 a Week (1935) - Sally Blair
- She Knew All the Answers (1941) - Prim Woman (uncredited)
- Lost Angel (1943) - Bobby's Mother (uncredited) (final film role)
