= Joseph Henabery =

American actor (1888–1976)

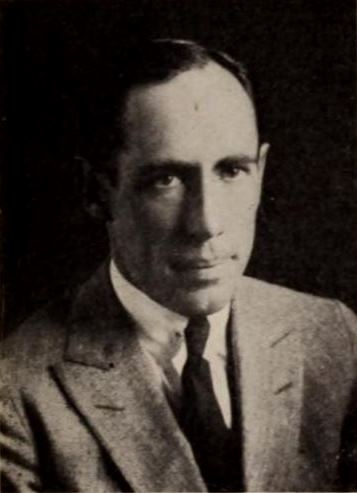
- Henabery in Exhibitors Herald, 1919
- Born: January 15, 1888; Omaha, Nebraska, U.S.
- Died: February 18, 1976 (aged 88); Los Angeles, California, U.S.
- Occupations: Actor; screenwriter; director
- Years active: 1916-1948
- Known for: Playing Abraham Lincoln in The Birth of a Nation
- Spouse: Lillian Nolan (1924-1976) (his death)
- Children: 2

Joseph Henabery (January 15, 1888 – February 18, 1976) was an American film actor, screenplay writer, and director. He is best known for his portrayal of Abraham Lincoln in D.W. Griffith's controversial 1915 silent historical epic The Birth of a Nation.

== Early years ==
Henabery was born in Omaha and raised in Los Angeles. He began acting as an amateur in California. Before he worked in films, Henabery worked for the San Pedro, Los Angeles, Salt Lake Railroad. When he was 25 years old, he became an extra for Universal Pictures.

== Career ==
Henabery's acting career began in The Joke on Yellentown (1914). From 1914 to 1917 he appeared in seventeen films, including his portrayal of Lincoln in The Birth of a Nation.

Henabery also worked as a second-unit director on Griffith's Intolerance (1916), and supervised the filming of at least one extended sequence that appeared in the film. Henabery also acted as Admiral de Coligny in the Renaissance French portion of the film depicting the St. Bartholomew's Day massacre. Throughout the rest of his career, he worked as a director. From the mid-1920s, and after professional disagreements with both Louis B. Mayer at Metro-Goldwyn-Mayer and Adolph Zukor at Paramount Pictures, Henabery found employment as a director for smaller Hollywood studios.

In 1931 he joined the Vitaphone studio in New York City, where he directed dozens of short subjects for the next 10 years. Most of them were musicals and comedies, featuring a host of popular singers in 20-minute sketches. Henabery remained with Vitaphone until the New York studio closed in 1940.

Henabery made documentaries and training films as a member of the Army Signal Corps.

== As Abraham Lincoln ==
Although Henabery's impersonation of Lincoln was a masterpiece of facial makeup, the 6 ft 1 in (185 cm) Henabery was three inches shorter than the 6 ft 4 in (193 cm) Lincoln. Kevin Brownlow's book The Parade's Gone By (1968) contains a photo of Henabery in costume and makeup as Lincoln, seated in a chair with planks placed on the floor under Henabery's feet so that his knees are raised several inches; this effect (with the planks kept off-camera in the movie) made Henabery's legs appear longer than they actually were.

== Personal life and death ==
Henabery and his wife, Lilian, had a daughter and a son. Henabery died on February 18, 1976, aged 88, at the Motion Picture Country House in Los Angeles, California.

== Filmography ==
=== Director ===
Title	Year	Notes
Say! Young Fellow	1918	director and scenarist
Mr. Fix-It	1918	co-screenplay
His Majesty The American	1919	Story and direction
Life of the Party	1920	
Love Madness	1920	
Brewster's Millions	1921	
Traveling Salesman	1921	
Don't Call Me Little Girl	1921	
Moonlight and Honeysuckle	1921	
Her Winning Way	1921	
Making a Man	1922	
The Stranger	1924	
A Sainted Devil	1924	
Cobra	1925	
Meet the Prince	1926	
Play Safe	1927	
Sailors' Wives	1928	
United States Smith	1928	
Red Hot Speed	1929	
The Quitter	1929	
Double or Nothing	1936	Short

=== Actor ===
The Race War (1915) with Bessie Buskirk

Title	Year	Role	Notes
The Birth of a Nation	1915	Abraham Lincoln	
The Spell of the Poppy	1915	John Hale	
The Penitentes	1915	Minor Role	Uncredited
Intolerance	1916	L'amiral de Coligny / Defendant	(final film role)
