= A Temperamental Wife =

1919 American film directed by David Kirkland

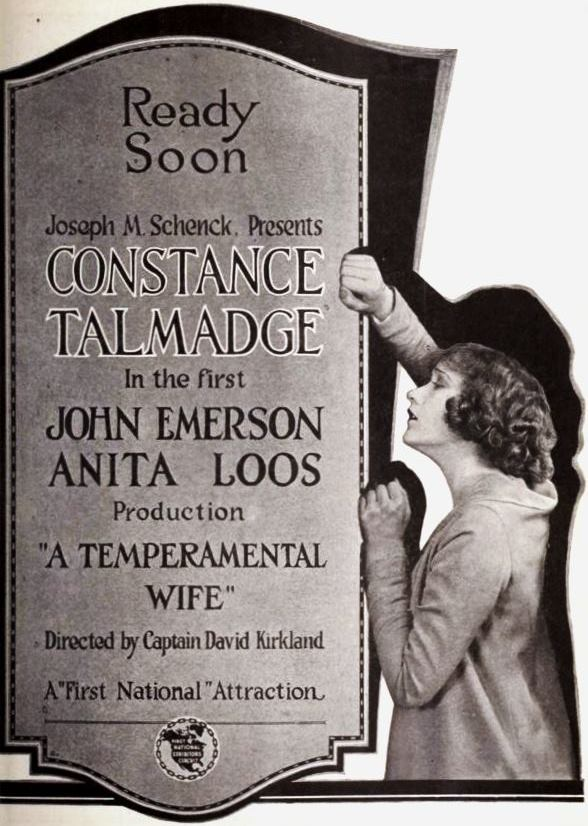
- Directed by: David Kirkland
- Written by: Jane Cowl; Jane Murfin; John Emerson; Anita Loos
- Produced by: John Emerson
- Starring: Constance Talmadge; Wyndham Standing
- Cinematography: Oliver T. Marsh
- Production company: Constance Talmadge Film Company
- Distributed by: First National Pictures
- Release date: September 1919
- Country: United States
- Languages: Silent; English intertitles

A Temperamental Wife is a 1919 silent film adventure drama directed by David Kirkland and starring Constance Talmadge, Wyndham Standing and Ben Hendricks Sr. Based on a stage play entitled Information, Please, written by Jane Cowl and Jane Murfin.

== Plot ==
a young married couple whose relationship is strained by the wife’s violence which quickly escalate into dramatic arguments because of her jealousy.

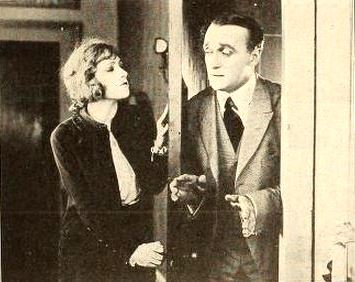
The Scene in A Temperamental Wife

== Cast ==
- Constance Talmadge as Billie Billings
- Wyndham Standing as Senator Newton
- Ben Hendricks Sr. as Dr. Wise
- Eulalie Jensen as Smith
- Armand Kaliz as Count Tosoff de Zoolac
- Ned Sparks as The Hotel Clerk
