= R. Beers Loos =

American journalist

Richard Beers Loos (October 4, 1860 – March 6, 1944) was an American journalist and newspaper publisher. He was the father of playwright and author Anita Loos.

== Biography ==
Loos married Minerva Ellen "Minnie" Smith. The couple had three children, including Anita. The family lived near Sisson, California (today Mount Shasta). At that time, Loos owned a local newspaper called the Sisson Mascot. He used the shortened form of his name for official work, R. Beers Loos.

Most accounts indicate that Loos moved from Sisson to San Francisco in 1892. On December 5 that year, Loos penned a letter in response to then-Governor of California, H. H. Markham, to present facts and opinion regarding a local murder case. Markham had solicited information from Loos after receiving letters both in favor of and against the pardon of the inmate charged with the crime, Frank Cochran, who was being held at San Quentin prison.
