= Puppets (1916 film) =

1916 film

- Directed by: Tod Browning
- Written by: Tod Browning; Irving Weil
- Starring: DeWolf Hopper Sr. Jack Brammall
- Release date: September 10, 1916
- Running time: 20 minutes
- Country: United States
- Language: Silent with English intertitles

Puppets is a 1916 American short drama film directed by Tod Browning.

== Cast ==
- DeWolf Hopper Sr. as Pantaloon (as DeWolf Hopper)
- Jack Brammall as Harlequin
- Robert Lawler as Clown
- Pauline Starke as Columbine
- Kate Toncray as The Widow
- Edward Bolles as Pierrot
- Max Davidson as Scaramouche
