= Moraga Estate =

Estate and winery in Los Angeles, California, United States

Coordinates: 34.084346°N 118.468925°W

Moraga Estate is an American estate, vineyard and winery in Bel Air, Los Angeles, California. As of 2013, it was owned by media mogul Rupert Murdoch.

== Overview ==
The estate included a 7,500-square-foot, nine-fireplace Mediterranean Revival–style mansion and guest house, a Provençal-style garden, and sixteen acres of vineyards.

== Location ==
It is located on Moraga Drive in Moraga Canyon along the western edge of the upscale neighborhood of Bel Air in Los Angeles, California. Moraga Canyon was already home to wild grapes, as noted by Fr. Juan Crespí (1721–1782) in his diary during the expedition of Gaspar de Portolà (1716–1784) in August 1769. It is barely five miles from the Pacific Ocean, and 600 to 900 feet in elevation. It can be seen from Interstate 405 and from the J. Paul Getty Museum.

== History ==
It was owned by film director Victor Fleming (1889-1949), who used it as a horse ranch in the 1930s and 1940s. Frequent guests to Fleming's estate were Clark Gable, Vivien Leigh, Ingrid Bergman and Spencer Tracy.

In 1959, it was purchased by Thomas V. Jones, who was chief executive of the Northrop Corporation for thirty years, and his wife Ruth. They turned the estate into a vineyard, by planting a terraced vineyard in 1978. In 1986, they purchased additional adjacent land to expand the vineyard. In 2005, new winery facilities were built on site.

In 2013, it was purchased by Rupert Murdoch, chairman and chief executive officer of the News Corporation, after he saw an advertisement in a newspaper he owns, The Wall Street Journal.

== Wines ==
Moraga
- Location: Bel Air, California, United States
- Founded: 1980; 46 years ago
- First vintage: 1989; 37 years ago
- Key people: Tom Jones, founder Rupert Murdoch, current owner
- Website: www.moragabelair.com

Under the brand Moraga Bel Air, it grew the following varietals of Bordeaux wine: Cabernet, Merlot, Petit Verdot, Cabernet Franc and Sauvignon blanc. It is grown on naturally deep gravel soil and annual rainfall of 24 inches. The first wine, the Moraga Red Table Wine, a blend of Cabernet Sauvignon and Merlot, was made by winemaker Bruno D'Alfonso at the Sanford Winery in 1989 and sold in 1992. The wine was made by D'Alfonso until the 1992 vintage, when production shifted to the Etude facility in Napa, where Tony Soter made the wine. The first Moraga White Table Wine was produced in 1998 and released in 2000. After Tony Soter, Scott Rich became winemaker in 1999 and stayed in that position until 2021. Paul Warson began in May 2021 to continue the tradition of growing outstanding wines in Los Angeles.

The wines were served at the Bel Air Bar and Grill, Bel-Air Country Club, The Beverly Hills Hotel, Patina, Spago, and Morton's The Steakhouse. They have received good reviews from wine critics Jancis Robinson and Robert M. Parker, Jr.
