= The Wharf Rat =

1916 film

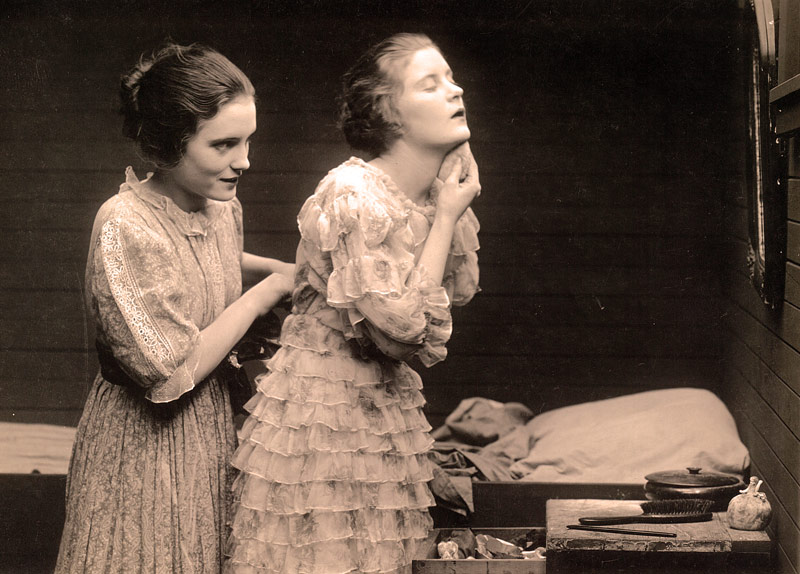
- Still with Mae Marsh and Pauline Starke
- Directed by: Chester Withey
- Written by: Anita Loos
- Starring: Mae Marsh; Robert Harron; Spottiswoode Aitken
- Cinematography: Alfred Gosden
- Production company: Fine Arts Film Company
- Distributed by: Triangle Distributing
- Release date: December 9, 1916
- Running time: 50 minutes
- Country: United States
- Language: Silent (English intertitles)

The Wharf Rat is a lost 1916 American silent comedy drama film directed by Chester Withey and starring Mae Marsh, Robert Harron, and Spottiswoode Aitken.

== Cast ==
- Mae Marsh as Carmen Wagner
- Robert Harron as Edward Holmes
- Spottiswoode Aitken as Carl Wagner
- Lillian Langdon as Mrs. Wagner
- Josephine Crowell as Mrs. McCracken
- Pauline Starke as Flo
- William H. Brown as Watchman
- Jack Brammall as Roy

== Preservation ==
With no holdings located in archives, The Wharf Rat is considered a lost film.

== Bibliography ==
- Donald W. McCaffrey & Christopher P. Jacobs. Guide to the Silent Years of American Cinema. Greenwood Publishing, 1999. ISBN 0-313-30345-2
