= A Cure for Suffragettes =

1913 American silent comedy film

- Directed by: Edward Dillon
- Story by: Anita Loos
- Starring: Dorothy Bernard; Kathleen Butler; Dorothy Gish
- Production company: Biograph Company
- Release date: November 17, 1913
- Running time: 4 minutes
- Country: United States
- Language: Silent (English intertitles)

A Cure for Suffragettes is a 1913 American silent comedy short film. It was written by Anita Loos and directed by Edward Dillon for Biograph Company. It stars Dorothy Bernard, Kathleen Butler, and Dorothy Gish. A print exists in the film holdings of Worldview Entertainment (Paul Killiam collection).
