= The Devil's Cargo =

1925 film by Victor Fleming

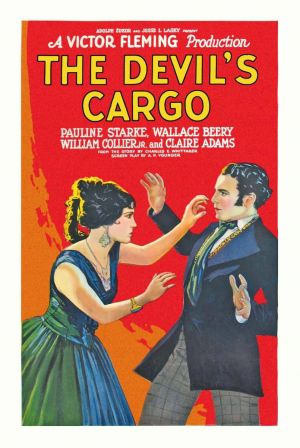
- Poster
- Directed by: Victor Fleming
- Written by: Charles E. Whittaker; A.P. Younger
- Produced by: Adolph Zukor; Jesse Lasky
- Starring: Wallace Beery; Pauline Starke
- Cinematography: Charles Schoenbaum (as C. Edgar Schoenbaum)
- Distributed by: Paramount Pictures
- Release date: February 2, 1925
- Running time: 80 min.; 8 reels (7,890 feet)
- Country: United States
- Language: Silent (English intertitles)

The Devil's Cargo is a 1925 American silent drama film produced by Famous Players–Lasky and distributed by Paramount Pictures. It was directed by Victor Fleming and starred Wallace Beery and Pauline Starke. It is based on an original story for the screen.

== Plot ==
As described in a review in a film magazine, John Joyce arrives in Sacramento, California, with his sister Martha during the California Gold Rush of 1848 to 1855. He has taken a job as an editor at a local newspaper. Like other residents, John is outraged by the lawless activities happening in a mining camp in the City. He joins a group called the Vigilantes, who want to expel the residents of the mining camp.

John meets and falls in love with Faro Sampson, thinking her to be a minister's daughter. When he discovers that Faro is the daughter of a gambler and a performer at his gambling house, John spurns her. However, when Faro comes to visit him, he realizes that he still loves her. John later visits the mining camp to see her.

At this point, the Vigilantes move in to disperse the camp. When they find that John is fraternizing with a camp girl, they evict him and Martha also. The evictees are forced to board a boat on the Sacramento River. However, the boat develops boiler trouble and most of the passengers force their way off. The boiler finally bursts and the boat starts drifting downstream. John, Faro and Martha are still onboard, along with a few crew and passengers.

Ben, a fireman in the crew, assumes command of the boat. When he makes unwanted sexual advances to Martha, John starts fighting him. During the fight, a skylight falls on Ben's head, incapacitating him. A rescue ship saves Martha, John and Faro; the two lovers find happiness.

== Cast ==
- Wallace Beery as Ben
- Pauline Starke as Faro Sampson
- Claire Adams as Martha Joyce
- William Collier Jr. as John Joyce
- Raymond Hatton as Mate
- George Cooper as Jerry Dugan
- Dale Fuller as Millie
- Spec O'Donnell as Jimmy
- Emmett King as Square Deal Sampson (credited as Emmett C. King)
- John Webb Dillon as Farwell (credited as John Webb Dillon)
- Louis King as Briggs
- Martha Mattox as Mrs. Farwell

== Preservation ==
The Library of Congress catalog and film archives do not show any listings for the film. However, the silentera.com site and an online dvd retailer list the film as available for sale.
