= Bessie Buskirk =

American actress (1892–1952)

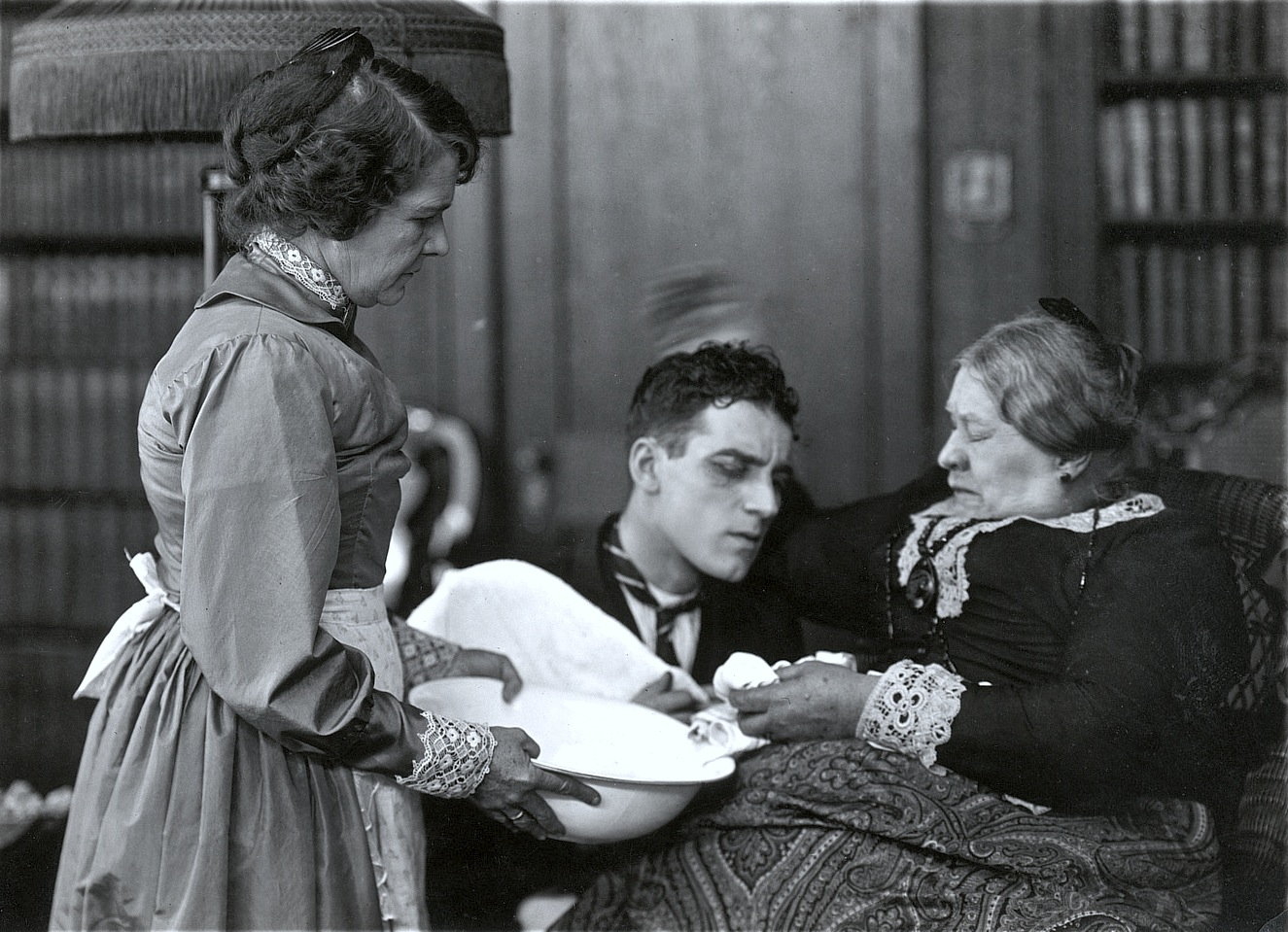
Bessie Buskirk(very questionable) on left portraying a maid in Her Official Fathers (1917). (*note..The actress on the left is probably another performer, not Buskirk. Buskirk in 1917 should be 25 years old. The actress pictured here is obviously much older. Cast list may be incomplete for this film

Bessie Buskirk (March 21, 1892 – November 19, 1952) was an actress on stage and in silent films in the United States. She was a child actress on stage before becoming a film actress as an adult. Already in 1900, she was appearing on stage. She appeared in several short films in 1915 and continued to be cast in various credited roles into 1917.

== Early life ==
She was born in Illinois. Her father was a stage carpenter before the family moved to Los Angeles.

== Career ==
She starred opposite Joseph Henabery in The Huron Converts and The Race Love in 1915. She portrayed Donalbain in Macbeth (1916 film). She also had credited roles in 1917 films.

== Burial ==
She is buried in the Angelus Rosedale Cemetery in Los Angeles.

== Filmography ==
- Farewell to Thee (1915) short film not to be confused with Aloha Oe (film)
- A Mother's Justice (1915)
- The Ever Living Isles (1915)
- The Huron Converts (1915) with Joseph Henabery, a Reliance Film
- The Race Love / The Race War (1915) with Joseph Henabery
- The House Built Upon Sand (1916)
- Macbeth (1916)
- Pet of Patagonia (1916)
- Her Official Fathers (1917)
- Cheerful Givers (1917)
