= A Mouse Is Born =

1951 novel

- Author: Anita Loos
- Language: English
- Genre: Comedy
- Publisher: Doubleday
- Publication date: 1951
- Publication place: United States
- Media type: Print

A Mouse Is Born is a 1951 comedy novel by the American author Anita Loos. It satirizes early Hollywood through the eyes of an ingenue actress Effie Huntress. It was her third published novel, a gap of twenty four years since her second But Gentlemen Marry Brunettes. The novel is narrated by its protagonist, telling her yet unborn first child about her adventures in the film industry.

== Bibliography ==
- Slide, Anthony. The Hollywood Novel: A Critical Guide to Over 1200 Works with Film-related Themes Or Characters, 1912 Through 1994. McFarland & Company, 1995.
- Ware, Susan. Notable American Women: A Biographical Dictionary Completing the Twentieth Century. Harvard University Press, 2004.
