= Adventure (novel) =

1911 novel by Jack London

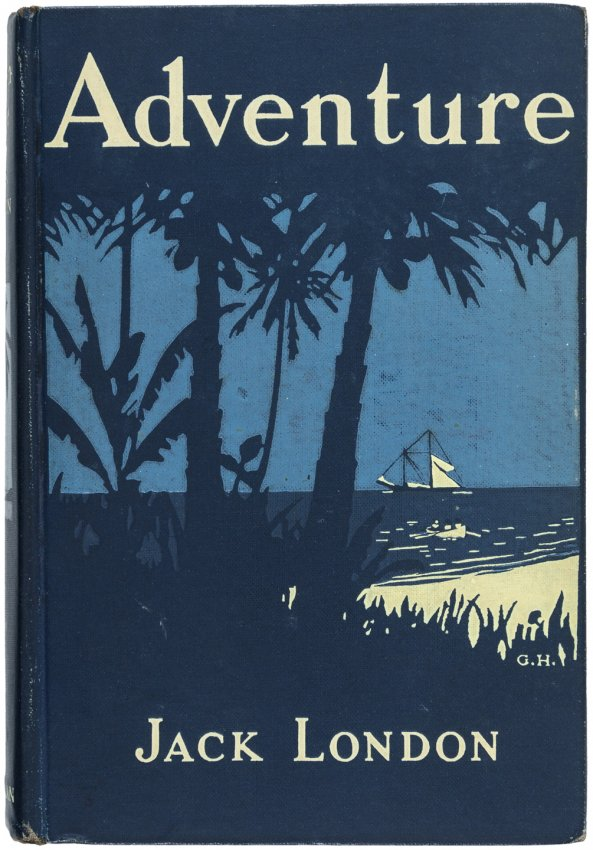
- Hardcover first edition
- Author: Jack London
- Language: English
- Genre: Fiction
- Publisher: The Macmillan Company
- Publication date: 1911
- Publication place: United States
- Media type: Print (hardback & paperback)
- Pages: 405 pp.
- OCLC: 49295328

Adventure is a novel by Jack London released in 1911 by The Macmillan Company.

== Overview ==
The novel explores the themes of domination of one people over the others, the differences between races and the strength of the human spirit, strengthened in a struggle with the nature and society.
