= Victor Fleming =

American filmmaker (1889–1949)

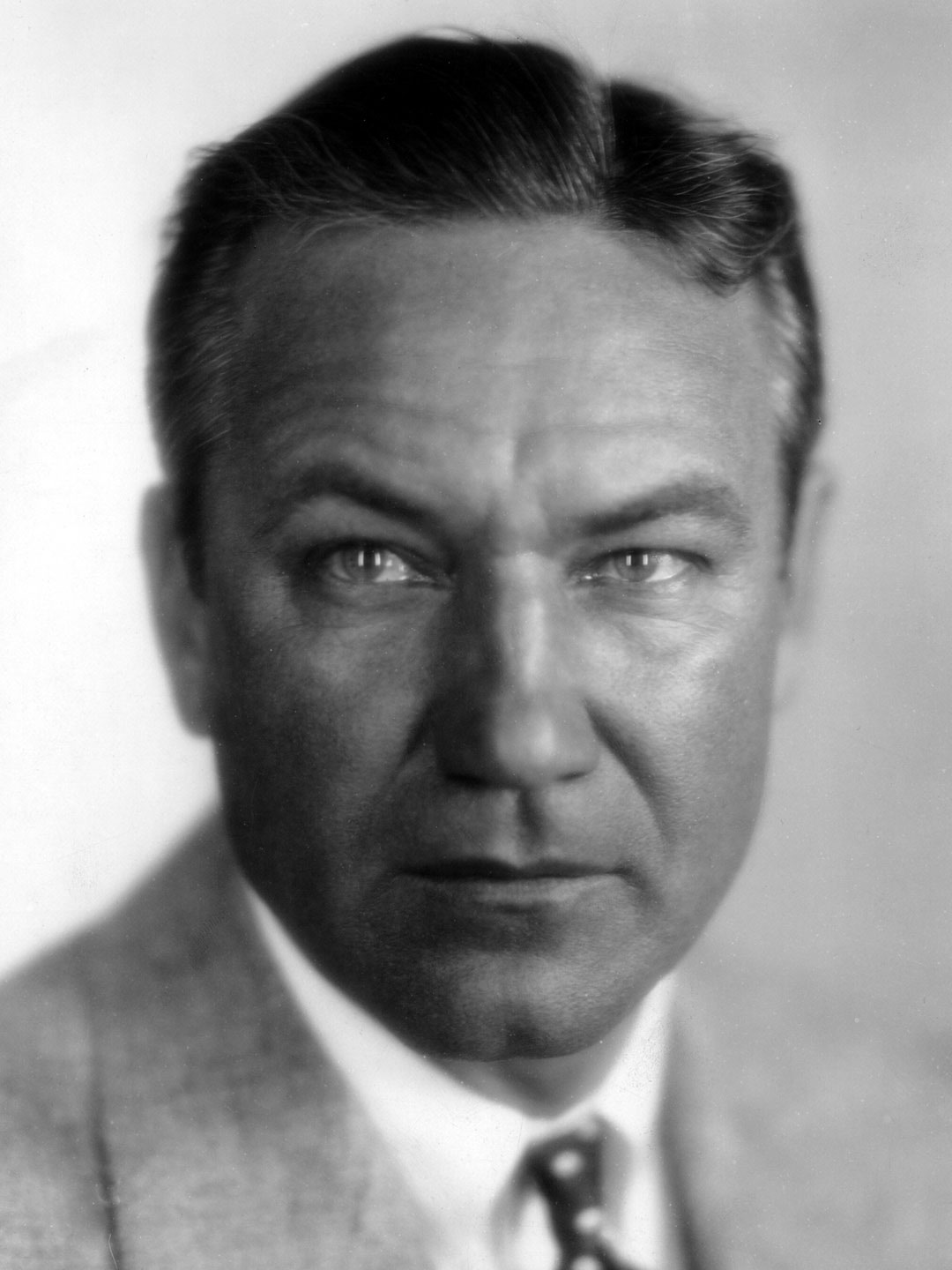
- Fleming in 1927
- Born: Victor Lonzo Fleming; February 23, 1889; La Cañada Flintridge, California, U.S.
- Died: January 6, 1949 (aged 59); Cottonwood, Arizona, U.S.
- Resting place: Hollywood Forever Cemetery
- Occupations: Director; cinematographer; producer
- Years active: 1910–1949
- Known for: Treasure Island; Captains Courageous; The Wizard of Oz; Gone with the Wind; Dr. Jekyll and Mr. Hyde; Joan of Arc
- Spouse: Lucile Rosson (m. 1933)
- Children: 2

Victor Lonzo Fleming (February 23, 1889 – January 6, 1949) was an American film director, cinematographer, and producer. His most popular films were the historical drama Gone with the Wind, for which he won an Academy Award for Best Director, and the fantasy film The Wizard of Oz (both 1939). Fleming has those same two films listed in the top 10 of the American Film Institute's 2007 AFI's 100 Years...100 Movies list.

== Biography ==
=== Early life ===
Fleming was born at the Banbury Ranch near what is now La Cañada Flintridge, California, the son of Eva (née Hartman) and William Richard Lonzo Fleming.

=== Career ===
He served in the photographic section for the United States Army during World War I, and acted as chief photographer for President Woodrow Wilson in Versailles, France. Beginning in 1918, Fleming taught at and headed Columbia University's School of Military Cinematography, training over 700 soldiers to cut, edit, shoot, develop, store and ship film; filmmakers who participated in the program included Josef von Sternberg, Ernest B. Schoedsack, and Lewis Milestone. He showed a mechanical aptitude early in life; while working as a car mechanic, he met the director Allan Dwan, who took him on as a camera assistant. He soon rose to the rank of cinematographer, working with both Dwan and D. W. Griffith, and directed his first film in 1919.

Many of his silent films were action movies, often starring Douglas Fairbanks, or Westerns. Because of his robust attitude and love of outdoor sports, he became known as a "man's director"; however, he also proved an effective director of women. Under his direction, Vivien Leigh won the Best Actress Oscar, Hattie McDaniel won for Best Supporting Actress, and Olivia de Havilland was nominated.

In the opinion of veteran cinematographer Archie Stout, of all the directors he worked with, Fleming was the most knowledgeable when it came to camera angles and appropriate lenses. He was remembered by Van Johnson as being a masterful director but a "tough man" to work for. He was close friends with another veteran cinematographer, Charles Schoenbaum.

=== Metro-Goldwyn-Mayer ===
“Fleming wasn’t a joking man, he was a very serious, demanding man, and very positive in what he wanted to get, and most of his leading men were patterned after his own behavior; he was a real tough man. I think there was more Fleming in Clark Gable at the end than there was Gable in Gable. I think that Gable mimicked Fleming and became that kind of man on the screen.”—Filmmaker Henry Hathaway, from interview in Focus on Film No. 7, 1971

In 1932, Fleming joined MGM and directed some of the studio's most prestigious films. Red Dust (1932), Bombshell (1933), and Reckless (1935) showcasing Jean Harlow, while Treasure Island (1934) starring Wallace Beery and Captains Courageous (1937) with Spencer Tracy brought a touch of literary distinction to boy's-own adventure stories. His two most famous films came in 1939, when The Wizard of Oz was closely followed by Gone with the Wind.

Fleming's version of Dr. Jekyll and Mr. Hyde (1941), with Spencer Tracy, was generally rated below Rouben Mamoulian's 1931 pre-Code version, which had starred Fredric March. Fleming's 1942 film version of John Steinbeck's Tortilla Flat starred Tracy, John Garfield, Hedy Lamarr, and Frank Morgan. Other films that Fleming made with Tracy include Captains Courageous (for which Tracy won his first Oscar), A Guy Named Joe, and Test Pilot. He directed Clark Gable in a total of five films – Red Dust, The White Sister, Test Pilot, Gone with the Wind, and Adventure.

== Personal life ==
He owned the Moraga Estate in Bel Air, Los Angeles, California, then a horse ranch. Frequent guests to his estate included Clark Gable and Carole Lombard, Vivien Leigh and Laurence Olivier, John Barrymore, Ingrid Bergman, Judy Garland and Spencer Tracy.

He died en route to a hospital in Cottonwood, Arizona, after suffering a heart attack on January 6, 1949. His death occurred shortly after completing Joan of Arc (1948) with Ingrid Bergman, one of the few films that he did not make for MGM. Despite mixed reviews, Fleming's film version of the life of Joan received seven Oscar nominations, winning two.

=== Political beliefs ===
It was reported in James Curtis's book Spencer Tracy: A Biography that Anne Revere once said Fleming was "violently pro-Nazi" and strongly opposed to the United States entering World War II. According to the Fleming biography Victor Fleming: An American Movie Master, by author Michael Sragow, Fleming had once mocked the UK at the outset of World War II by taking a bet as to how long the country could withstand an attack by Germany.

The accuracy of Revere's characterization of Fleming has been disputed. According to Victor Fleming: An American Movie Master, Revere made that claim because she felt she had been cast in the first attempt to film The Yearling in 1941 over Flora Robson (Note: MGM first attempted to film The Yearling in 1941 under the direction of Fleming, but production was abandoned due to numerous production problems. It was successfully resumed with a different cast, under the direction of Clarence Brown, and released in 1946.) because Robson was British. However, at the time of the casting, Fleming was working on the film Dr. Jekyll and Mr. Hyde, which featured a British producer and a cast largely composed of British or British Commonwealth actors. Additionally, Revere did not know Fleming beyond their professional relationship.

== Filmography ==
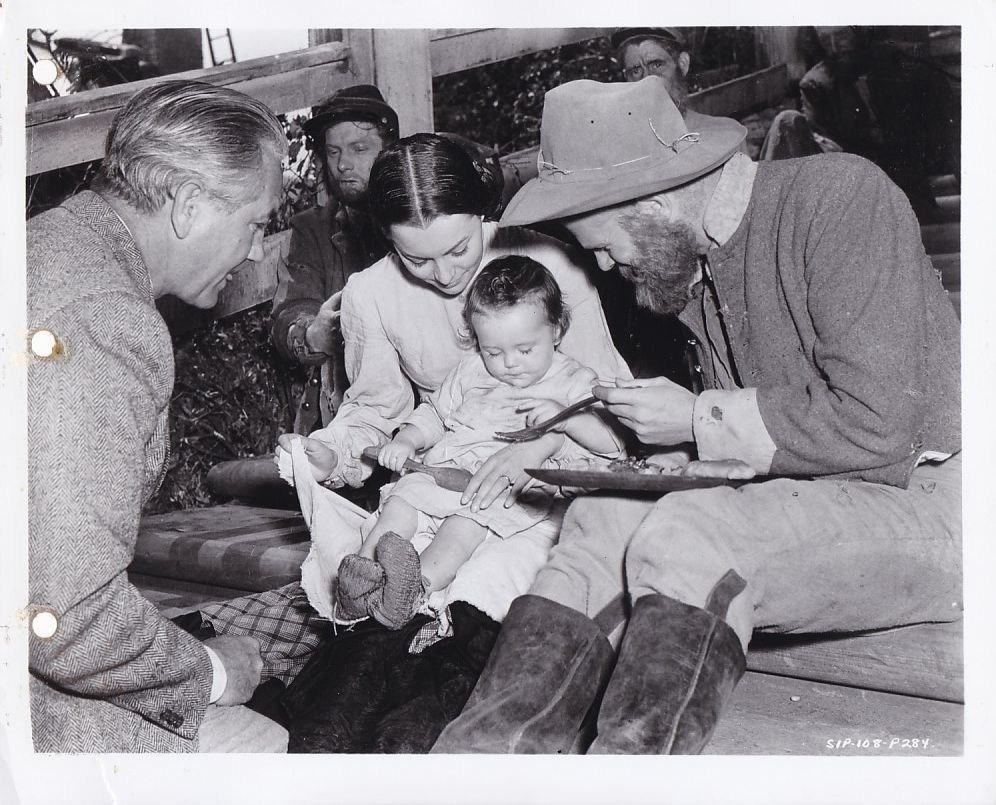
On set of Gone with the Wind (1939). Left to right: Director Victor Fleming, Olivia de Havilland, and Louis Jean Heydt

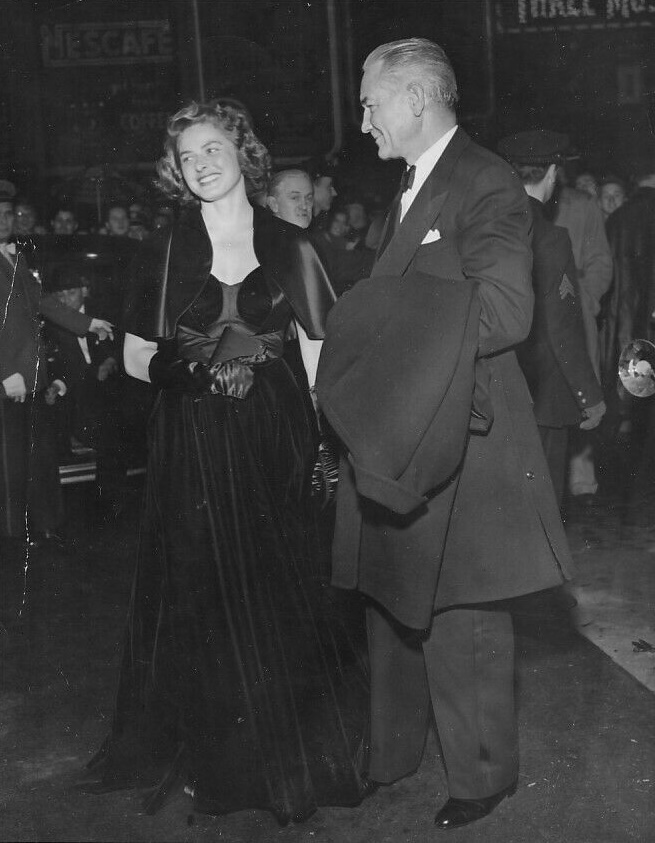
Ingrid Bergman with director Fleming at the premiere of Joan of Arc (1949)

- The Half-Breed (1916)
- When the Clouds Roll By (1919) (directorial debut)
- The Mollycoddle (1920)
- Mama's Affair (1921)
- Woman's Place (1921)
- The Lane That Had No Turning (1922)
- Red Hot Romance (1922)
- Anna Ascends (1922)
- Dark Secrets (1923)
- Law of the Lawless (1923)
- To the Last Man (1923)
- The Call of the Canyon (1923)
- Empty Hands (1924)
- Code of the Sea (1924)
- Adventure (1925)
- The Devil's Cargo (1925)
- A Son of His Father (1925)
- Lord Jim (1925)
- The Blind Goddess (1926)
- Mantrap (1926)
- The Way of All Flesh (1927)
- Hula (1927)
- The Rough Riders (1927)
- The Awakening (1928)
- Abie's Irish Rose (1928)
- Wolf Song (1929)
- The Virginian (1929)
- Common Clay (1930)
- Renegades (1930)
- Around the World in 80 Minutes with Douglas Fairbanks (1931)
- The Wet Parade (1932)
- Red Dust (1932)
- The White Sister (1933)
- Bombshell (1933)
- Treasure Island (1934)
- Reckless (1935)
- The Farmer Takes a Wife (1935)
- Captains Courageous (1937)
- Test Pilot (1938)
- The Wizard of Oz (1939)
- Gone with the Wind (1939)
- Dr. Jekyll and Mr. Hyde (1941)
- Tortilla Flat (1942)
- A Guy Named Joe (1943)
- Adventure (1946)
- Joan of Arc (1948) (final film)

Directed Academy Award performances
Under Fleming's direction, these actors have received Academy Award nominations and wins for their performances in their respective roles.

Year	Performer	Film	Result
Academy Award for Best Actor
1927	Emil Jannings	The Way of All Flesh	Won
1937	Spencer Tracy	Captains Courageous	Won
1939	Clark Gable	Gone with the Wind	Nominated
Academy Award for Best Actress
1939	Vivien Leigh	Gone with the Wind	Won
1948	Ingrid Bergman	Joan of Arc	Nominated
Academy Award for Best Supporting Actor
1942	Frank Morgan	Tortilla Flat	Nominated
1948	José Ferrer	Joan of Arc	Nominated
Academy Award for Best Supporting Actress
1939	Olivia de Havilland	Gone with the Wind	Nominated
1939	Hattie McDaniel	Gone with the Wind	Won

In addition, Judy Garland received an Academy Juvenile Award for, along with Babes in Arms, her performance in Fleming's The Wizard of Oz (both 1939).
