= Anita Loos =

American actress and writer (1888–1981)

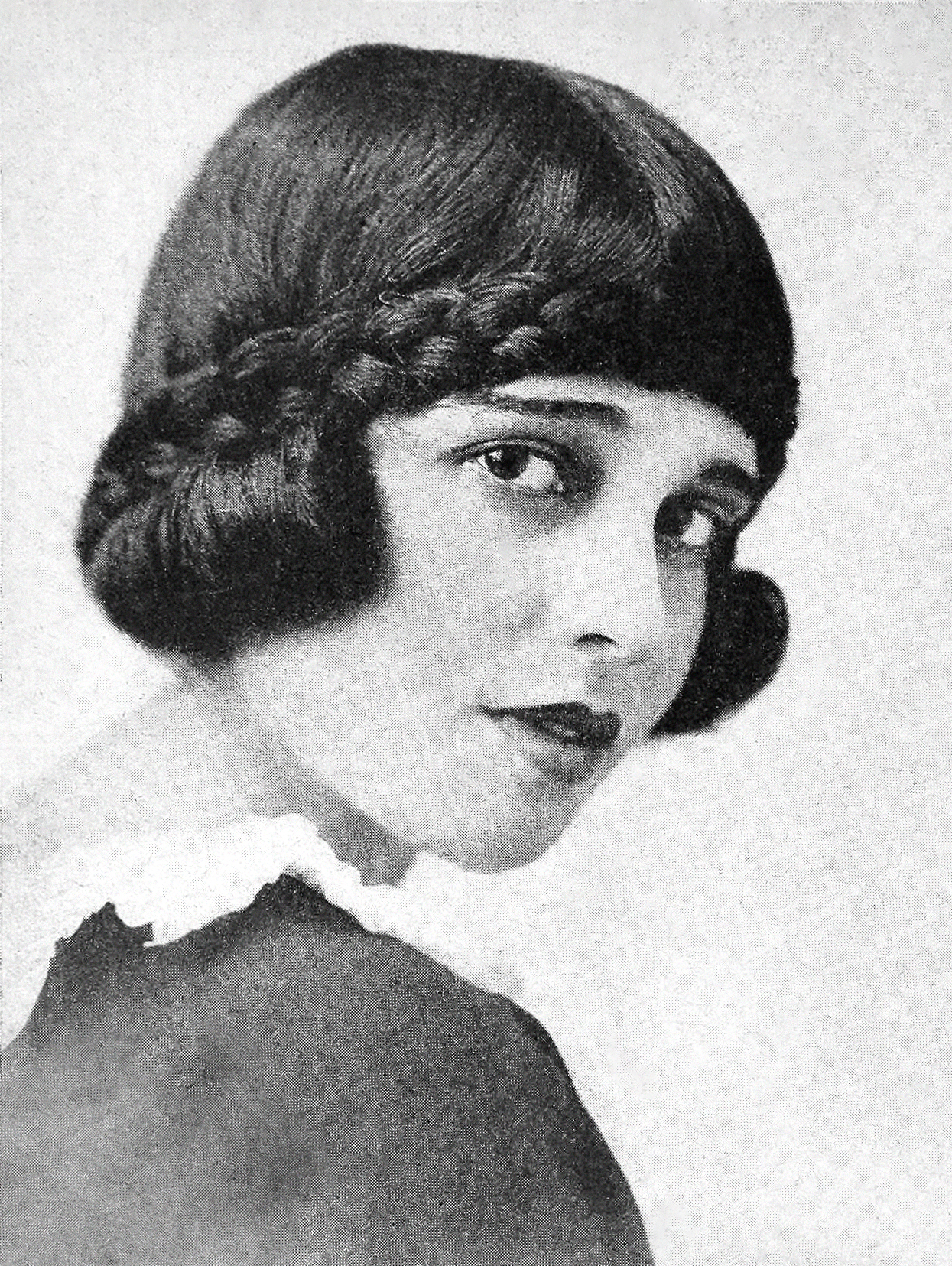
- Loos in 1916
- Born: April 26, 1888; Sisson, California, U.S.
- Died: August 18, 1981 (aged 93); New York City, New York, U.S.
- Resting place: Etna Cemetery, Etna, California
- Occupations: Actress; novelist; playwright; screenwriter
- Years active: 1912–1980
- Spouses: Frank Pallma, Jr. (m. 1915; div. 1919) John Emerson (m. 1919; died 1956)
- Father: Richard Beers Loos
- Relatives: Mary Loos (niece)

Corinne Anita Loos (April 26, 1888 – August 18, 1981) was an American actress, novelist, playwright and screenwriter. In 1912, she became the first female staff screenwriter in Hollywood, when D. W. Griffith put her on the payroll at Triangle Film Corporation. She is best known for her 1925 comic novel, Gentlemen Prefer Blondes, her screenplay of the 1939 adaptation of The Women, and her 1951 Broadway adaptation of Colette's novella Gigi.

== Early life ==
Loos was born in Sisson (now Mount Shasta), California, to newspaper publisher Richard Beers Loos and Minerva Ellen "Minnie" Loos (née Smith). She had one sister, Gladys Loos, and one brother, Harry Clifford Loos, a physician and a co-founder of the Ross-Loos Medical Group.

About pronouncing her name, Loos said, "The family has always used the correct French pronunciation which is lohse. However, I myself pronounce my name as if it were spelled luce, since most people pronounce it that way and it was too much trouble to correct them."

Her father founded Sisson Mascot, a tabloid newspaper, for which her mother did most of the work of a publisher. In 1892, when Anita was three years old, the family moved to San Francisco, where her father bought the newspaper Music and Drama, with money that her mother "wheedled" from her maternal grandfather, dropped the subject of music, in which he had no interest, and retitled the weekly to The Dramatic Review, filled with the photographs of pretty girls, that copied the format of the British Police Gazette, and led to her father's romance with the opera singer Alice Nielsen.

By age six, Anita Loos wanted to be a writer. While living in San Francisco, she accompanied her father, an alcoholic, on exciting fishing trips to the pier, exploring the city's underbelly (the Tenderloin and the Barbary Coast) and making friends with the locals. This fed her lifelong fascination with lowlifes and loose women.

== Career ==
=== 1897–1915: Early career ===
In 1897, at their father's urging, Loos and her sister performed in a San Francisco stock company production of Quo Vadis? Gladys died at age eight of appendicitis, while their father was away on business.

Anita continued appearing on stage, being the family's breadwinner. Her father's spendthrift ways caught up with them, and in 1903 he took an offer to manage a theater company in San Diego. Anita performed simultaneously in her father's company, and under another name with a more legitimate stock company.

After graduating from San Diego High School, Loos devised a method of cobbling together published reports of Manhattan social life and mailing them to a friend in New York, who would submit them under the friend's name for publication in San Diego. Her father had written some one-act plays for the stock company, and he encouraged Anita to write plays; she wrote The Ink Well, a successful piece, for which she received periodic royalties.

In 1911, the theater was running one-reel films after each night's performances; Anita would take a perfunctory bow and run to the back of the theater to watch them. She sent her first attempt at a screenplay, He Was a College Boy, to the Biograph Company, for which she received $25. The New York Hat, starring Mary Pickford and Lionel Barrymore and directed by D. W. Griffith, was her third screenplay and the first to be produced. Loos dredged real life, including her own, for scenarios: she dished up her father's cronies and brother's friends, also using the rich vacationers from the San Diego resorts; eventually every experience became grist for her script mill.

By 1912, Loos had sold scripts to both the Biograph and Lubin studios. Between 1912 and 1915, she wrote 105 scripts, all but four of which were produced. She wrote 200 scenarios before she ever visited a film studio.

=== 1915–1917: Hollywood ===
Stylized cover drawing of Anita Loos by Frank Walts on the April 1918 issue of The Liberator

In 1915, trying to escape her mother's influence and objections to a career in Hollywood, Loos married Frank Pallma, Jr., the son of the band conductor. But Frank proved to be penniless and dull – after six months, she sent him out for hair pins, and while he was gone she packed her bags and went home to her mother. After that, Minnie rethought her position on a Hollywood career. Accompanied by her mother, Anita joined the film colony in Hollywood where Griffith put Loos on the payroll for Triangle Film Corporation at $75 a week with a bonus for every produced script.

Many of the scripts she turned out for Griffith went unproduced. Some he considered unfilmable because the "laughs were all in the lines, there was no way to get them onto the screen", but he encouraged her to continue, because reading them amused him. Her first screen credit was for an adaptation of Macbeth in which her billing came right after Shakespeare's. When Griffith asked her to assist him and Frank E. Woods in writing the intertitles for his epic Intolerance (1916), she traveled to New York City for the first time to attend its premiere. Instead of returning to Hollywood, Loos spent the fall of 1916 in New York and met with Frank Crowninshield of Vanity Fair. They had an instant rapport and Loos remained a Vanity Fair contributor for several decades.

Loos returned to California as Griffith was leaving Triangle to make longer films, and she joined director and future husband John Emerson for a string of successful Douglas Fairbanks movies. Loos and company realized that Douglas Fairbanks's acrobatics were an extension of his effervescent personality and parlayed his natural athletic ability into swashbuckling adventure roles. His Picture in the Papers (1916) was noted for its wry style of discursive and witty subtitles: "My most popular subtitle introduced the name of a new character. The name was something like this: 'Count Xxerkzsxxv.' Then there was a note, 'To those of you who read titles aloud, you can't pronounce the Count's name. You can only think it.' "

The five films Loos wrote for Fairbanks helped make him a star. When Fairbanks was offered a sweetheart deal with Famous Players–Lasky, he took the team of Emerson-Loos with him at the high income of $500 a week. During this time Loos, Fairbanks, and Emerson collaborated well together, and Loos was getting as much publicity as either Lillian Gish or Mary Pickford. Photoplay magazine labeled her "The Soubrette of Satire".

=== 1918–1924: New York ===
In 1918, Famous Players–Lasky offered the couple a four-picture deal in New York for more money than they had been making with the Fairbanks unit.

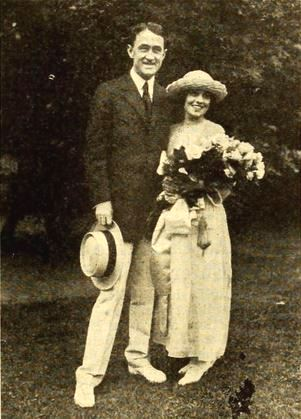
Loos and Emerson at their wedding on June 28, 1919 in Long Island

Loos, Emerson and fellow writer Frances Marion migrated to New York as a group, with Loos and Emerson sharing a leased mansion in Great Neck, Long Island. Loos wanted Marion as chaperone, as she found herself attracted to Emerson, a man 15 years her senior that she would refer to as "Mr. E". He would readily admit that he "had never been, nor could be, faithful to any one female." Loos convinced herself he would see that she was different from all his other girls, and that behind his outwardly dull exterior was a great mind. She would later consider herself misled on both counts, writing: "I had set my sights on a man of brains, to whom I could look up", she lamented, "but what a terrible let down it would be to find out that I was smarter than he was."

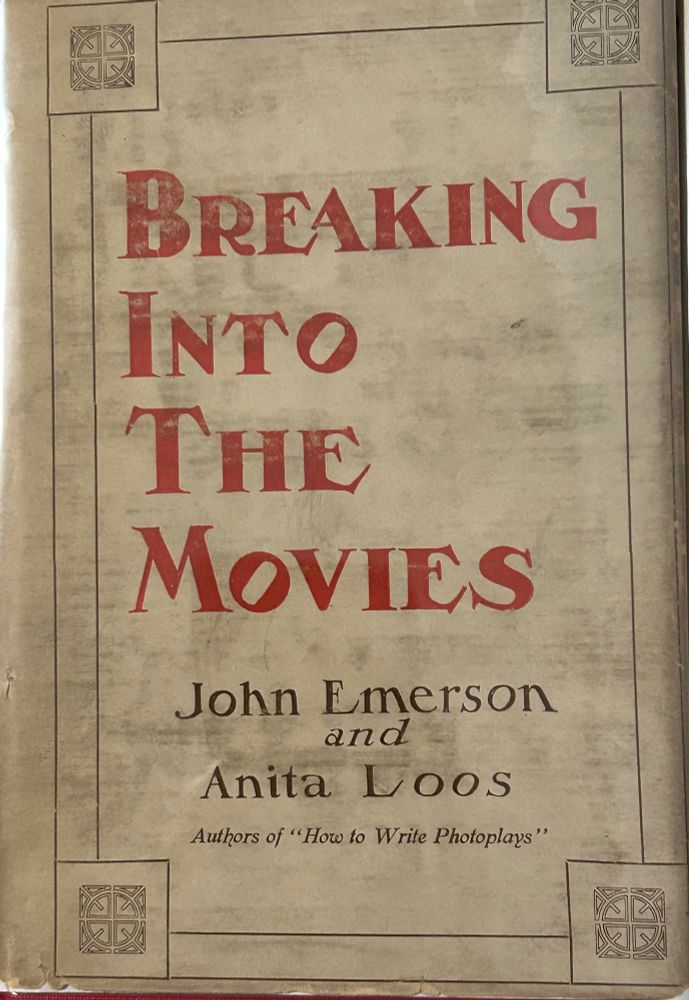
BREAKING INTO THE MOVIES

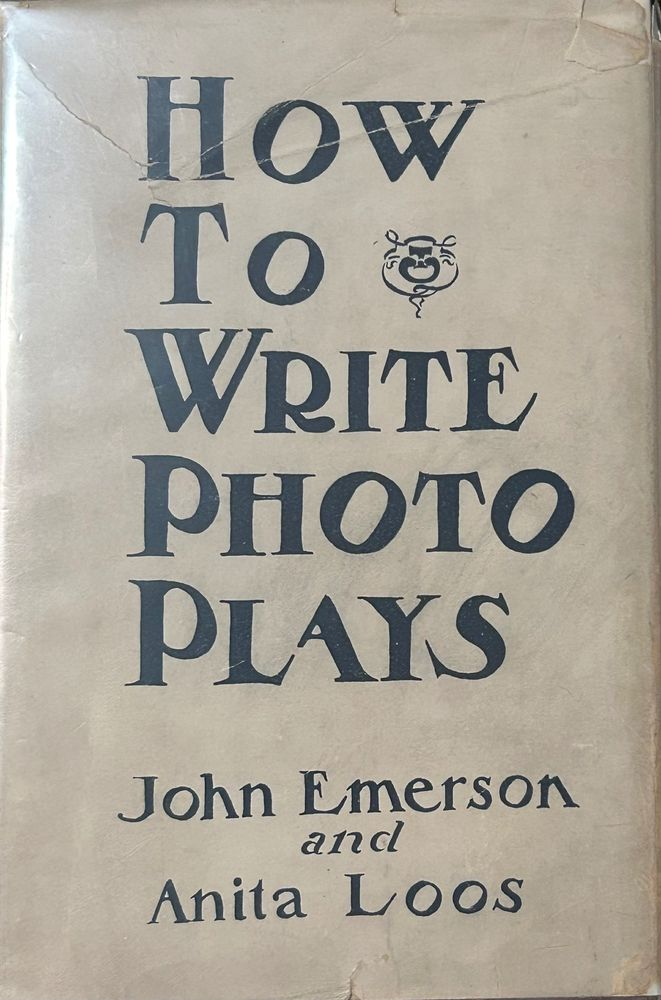
HOW TO WRITE PHOTOPLAYS

The pictures for Famous Players–Lasky were not as successful as their previous films, partly because they starred Broadway headliners not adept at screen acting and their contract was not renewed. The scripts carried both names but were mostly products of Loos alone. Later Loos would claim that Emerson took all the money and most of the credit, though his contribution usually consisted of observing from bed as she worked. Much to the chagrin of her friends, her adoration of Emerson had manifested as subservience. When William Randolph Hearst offered Loos a contract to write a picture for his mistress, Marion Davies, Loos included the unnecessary Emerson in the deal. Hearst liked the picture and Getting Mary Married (1919) was one of the first Marion Davies pictures that didn't lose money. In addition to their films, the couple wrote two books: How to Write Photoplays, published in 1920, followed by Breaking Into the Movies in 1921.

Loos and Emerson turned down another picture with Davies, preferring to write for their old friend Constance Talmadge, whose brother-in-law Joseph Schenck (husband of Norma Talmadge) was an independent producer. Both A Temperamental Wife (1919) and A Virtuous Vamp (1919) were great hits for Talmadge. The couple joined the Talmadges and the Schencks at the Ambassador Hotel on Park Avenue, with Constance filling the void left by the loss of her sister. When Anita and Constance weren't working, they went shopping. The Talmadge-Schencks convinced Anita to summer with them in Paris without Emerson. Much of this adventure would end up as fodder for Loos's book Gentlemen Prefer Blondes.

Upon returning, they produced five more films in 16 months. During this time, Loos had filed for divorce from her estranged first husband. Emerson proposed marriage and they were married at the Schenck estate on June 15, 1919. Loos was among the first to join Ruth Hale's Lucy Stone League, an organization that fought for women to preserve their maiden names after marriage as she continued with hers.

The couple moved into a modest Murray Hill apartment and cut back to two films a year in order to travel. They spent the summer in Paris. Loos and her new assistant, John Ashmore Creeland, visited many of the Paris-based writers Loos had met in America, as well as Gertrude Stein, Alice B. Toklas, Elisabeth Marbury and Elsie De Wolfe.

After one more film for Schenck and Talmadge, The Perfect Woman (1920), Emerson refused another contract. After working with Actors Equity during their 1919 strike, he decided that the Loos-Emerson team should make the move to the theater. Their first play, The Whole Town's Talking, which opened at the Bijou Theatre on August 29, 1923, received good reviews and was a moderate box-office success. Soon afterward the couple moved to a small house in Gramercy Park.

Emerson had convinced a devastated Loos that he needed to take a break from the marriage once a week. It was on these days he would date younger women, while Loos consoled herself by entertaining her friends: the Talmadge sisters, "Mama" Peg Talmadge, Marion Davies, Marilyn Miller, Adele Astaire and an assortment of chorus girls kept by prominent men. These "Tuesday Widows" soireés would influence her later writings, and it was with the "Tuesday Widows" that she visited one of her favorite hangouts, Harlem, where she developed a deep and lifelong appreciation for African-American culture. "Sometimes I get enquiries [sic] concerning my marriage to a man who treated me with complete lack of consideration, tried to take credit for my work and appropriated all my earnings", Loos wrote in Cast of Thousands. "The main reason is that my husband liberated me; granted me full freedom to choose my own companions."

Anita Loos and John Emerson in Edward Steichen photo for Vanity Fair, July 1928

=== 1925–1926: Gentlemen Prefer Blondes ===
Loos had become a devoted admirer of H. L. Mencken, a literary critic and intellect. When he was in New York, she would take a break from her "Tuesday Widows" and join his circle, which included Theodore Dreiser, Sherwood Anderson, Sinclair Lewis, Joseph Hergesheimer, essayist Ernest Boyd and theater critic George Jean Nathan. Loos adored Mencken, but gradually realized disappointingly, "High-IQ gentlemen didn't fall for women with brains, but those with more downstairs". In 1925, on the train to Hollywood with Mencken, she became keenly aware of this fact when he solicited the attention of a blonde in the dining car. Loos then began to write a sketch of Mencken and his vacant lady friends that would later become Gentlemen Prefer Blondes.

Gentlemen Prefer Blondes: The Illuminating Diary of a Professional Lady, began as a series of short sketches, illustrated by Ralph Barton, published in Harper's Bazaar, known as the "Lorelei" stories. They were satires on the state of sexual relations that only vaguely alluded to sexual intimacy; the magazine's circulation quadrupled overnight. The heroine of the stories, Lorelei Lee, was a bold, ambitious flapper, who was much more concerned with collecting expensive baubles from her conquests than any marriage licenses, in addition to being a shrewd woman of loose morals and high self-esteem. She was a practical young woman who had internalized the materialism of the United States in the 1920s and equated culture with cold cash and tangible assets.

The success of the short stories had the public clamoring for them in book form. Pushed by Mencken, she signed with Boni & Liveright. Modestly published in November 1925, the first printing sold out overnight. The initial reviews were rather bland and unimpressive, but through word of mouth it became the surprise best-seller of 1925. Loos garnered fan letters from fellow authors William Faulkner, Aldous Huxley and Edith Wharton, among others. "Blondes" would see three more printings sell by year's end and 20 more in its first decade. The little book would see 85 editions in the years to come and eventually be translated into 14 languages, including Chinese.

When asked who the models for her characters were, Loos would almost always say they were composites of various people. But when pressed, she admitted that toothless flirt Sir Francis Beekman was modeled after writer Joseph Hergesheimer and producer Jesse L. Lasky. Dorothy Shaw was modeled after herself and Constance Talmadge and Lorelei most closely resembled acquisitive Ziegfeld showgirl Lillian Lorraine, who was always looking for new places to display the diamonds bestowed by her suitors.

Emerson first attempted to suppress its publication and then settled for a personal dedication. Loos continued to be overworked throughout 1926, sometimes working many projects at once. In the spring of 1926 she completed the stage adaptation, which opened a few weeks later in Chicago and ran for 201 performances on Broadway. Emerson had developed a serious case of hypochondria by this time, affecting laryngitis attacks to divert attention from her work; in the words of his wife, "he was a man who enjoyed ill health." It was the opinion of New York psychiatrist, Smith Ely Jelliffe, "that she was to blame and in order for Emerson to get better she would have to give up her career." She resolved to retire after her next book, But Gentlemen Marry Brunettes, a sequel to Blondes that she had promised Harper's Bazaar.

The couple had planned another European vacation. Unwell at the last minute, Emerson insisted that Loos continue alone. Arriving in London, she was promptly taken under the wing of socialite Sibyl Colefax, whose drawing room had become filled with "the bright young things" of the day such as John Gielgud, Harold Nicolson, Noël Coward and notables such as Arnold Bennett, Max Beerbohm and Bernard Shaw. Photos of Loos on the London social scene appeared in the New York papers, and the unwell Emerson subsequently joined Loos. To keep his spirits up she took him to the theater every night. It worked; at times he spoke in normal tones. The couple traveled on to Paris as Emerson's recovery continued. In September, their vacation was cut short; Loos was needed back in New York to do revisions on Blondes for its Waldorf Theatre (Selwyn Theatre?), Broadway debut in September 1926, running for 199 performances in two theaters, closing at the Times Square Theatre, in April 1927.

=== 1927–1931: Leisure time ===
Anita Loos c. 1930s

When But Gentlemen Marry Brunettes was published in 1927, Emerson proposed another European vacation and went ahead of Loos. A seriously ill Loos followed him, coming down with a sinus attack in Vienna. She and the ear, nose and throat specialist who was treating her came up with a method of fixing Emerson's hypochondria. The doctor arranged a bit of sham surgery for him and presented him with the polyps that had been supposedly removed from his vocal cords. This placebo treatment did the trick, they returned with a cured Emerson. Not wanting to undo all her efforts, Loos retired to a life of leisure.

The first film version of Gentlemen Prefer Blondes (now lost) was released in 1928 starring Ruth Taylor as Lorelei Lee and Alice White as Dorothy. It was somewhat of a flop. From 1927 to 1929, Loos and Emerson traveled extensively, which was hard on Loos's health. All their winters were spent in Palm Beach, where Emerson would indulge in social climbing. Loos was starved of intellectual male companionship and met Wilson Mizner there, a witty and charming real estate speculator, and in some quarters – confidence man. Though they saw each other every day, the relationship was rumored to have stopped just short of having a full-blown affair. Emerson's throat ailment returned, though he recovered quickly after his second round of "Viennese surgery".

Loos and Emerson traveled to Hollywood for Christmas in 1929 with Loos's new friend, photographer Cecil Beaton, who was part of "the bright young things" crowd. Wilson Mizner had also relocated to Hollywood as a screenwriter. Since Emerson had his own entertainment, Loos was often in the company of Beaton or Mizner. When they returned to New York in the spring of 1930, Emerson expressed his unhappiness at her inattention, threatening a relapse of his throat ailment and Loos would spend much more time alone. Emerson had also lost money in the stock market crash, and suggested she return to work. Loos was not completely unhappy with this, and within a few months had produced a stage adaptation of But Gentlemen Marry Brunettes and a comedy Cherries are Ripe.

With their income reduced, the couple moved to a residential hotel and did less traveling in 1931. Not long after, Loos came upon a love letter from one of Emerson's conquests. Devastated, Loos offered him a divorce; Emerson refused and suggested they live apart, with him giving her a suitable allowance. Blaming herself for his unhappiness, she moved to an apartment on East Sixty-Ninth Street. However, her new life allowed her finally to spend her portion of what she earned for the couple in any way she liked.

=== 1931–1935: MGM screenwriter ===
When the Emerson-Loos team got an offer to write pictures for Irving Thalberg at MGM, Emerson refused to go. Loos took the $1,000-a-week salary alone.

Jean Harlow and Anita Loos in a publicity photo for Red-Headed Woman (1932) that pokes fun at her novel Gentlemen Prefer Blondes, in the hands of Harlow (a famous blonde who wore a red wig for the role).

The first project Thalberg handed Loos was Jean Harlow's Red-Headed Woman because F. Scott Fitzgerald was having no luck adapting Katherine Brush's book. Fitzgerald, an accomplished writer of novels like The Great Gatsby, was fired and replaced by Loos in a predominantly male run studio system. The picture, completed in May 1932, was a smash and established Harlow as a star and put Loos once again in the front rank of screenwriters.

"She was a very valuable asset for MGM, because the studio had so many femmes fatales – Garbo, Crawford, Shearer, and Harlow – that we were always on the lookout for 'shady lady' stories. But they were problematic because of the censorship code. Anita, however, could be counted on to supply the delicate double entendre, the telling innuendo. Whenever we had a Jean Harlow picture on the agenda, we always thought of Anita first." – MGM producer Samuel Marx

Loos moved to an apartment in Hollywood, where she was unexpectedly joined by Emerson. Though Emerson expressed contrition about his previous behavior, he did nothing to change it. While Emerson busied himself offering screen tests to young starlets, Loos was now free to see whomever she pleased, including her now quite ill friend Wilson Mizner. Mizner having abused his body with alcohol and drugs, wasted away until dying on April 3, 1932, a date Loos would continue to mark.

At MGM, Loos happily turned out scripts; however, she frequently had to use Emerson as a conduit to communicate with directors and other executives who balked at dealing with a woman on equal footing. This worked well to promote the idea they were a happy couple and writing team. She bought a modest house in Beverly Hills in 1934. During the day it was work, and at night parties given by other MGM studio executives or stars, like the Thalbergs, the Selznicks and the Goldwyns. Loos was a frequent attendee at George Cukor's Sunday brunches, which was the closest Hollywood had to a literary salon.

In 1935, about the time of the Writer's Guild formation, she was paired with Robert Hopkins, who would later become a frequent collaborator. Their work on San Francisco got an Academy Award nomination for best original screenplay. She based Clark Gable's character on some confidence men she had known, including Wilson Mizner. Thalberg had taken ill again and gave Emerson a two-year contract as a producer at $1,250 a week. By mid-1937 Loos had decided not to renew her contract with MGM; since friend and supporter Thalberg's death in September 1936, things had not been going well at the studio and every film felt like a struggle. She signed with Samuel Goldwyn, formerly of MGM and now head of United Artists, for $5,000 a week and almost immediately regretted it. Loos soldiered on, working on "unworkable" scripts.

=== 1936–1945: Life alone ===
In October Loos and her brother Clifford checked Emerson into a very expensive sanatorium where he was diagnosed with schizophrenia. Loos, who had always left the finances to Emerson, soon discovered that most of her money was no longer in joint accounts but in his own private accounts. Overworked at the studio and under stress from Emerson, she became more and more depressed. Loos promptly bought herself out of her United Artists contract, re-signed with MGM and bought a beach-front house in Santa Monica. After 17 years of marriage in 1937 Loos finally asked Emerson for a divorce and he agreed but would continue to stave off any talk of plans, making finalization impossible. When Emerson was deemed well enough to leave the sanatorium, she paid for a nurse to care for him in an apartment of his own.

MGM had bought the film rights to Clare Boothe Luce's 1936 smash Broadway hit The Women in 1937. Many writers had, unsuccessfully, taken a stab at a screenplay version. The studio handed it to Loos and veteran scriptwriter Jane Murfin, and three weeks later Loos handed Cukor a script that he loved. Unfortunately the censorship board did not. They insisted on changing more than 80 lines and the film had to go into production. Loos was apprehensive, but Cukor insisted she do the changes on set, among his all-star bevy of leading ladies on this female-only picture that included Thalberg widow Norma Shearer, Joan Crawford and Rosalind Russell. Loos made immediate friends with Paulette Goddard who was surprisingly well-read. When Hunt Stromberg, the last producer she respected, left MGM to produce independently; Loos tried to get out of her contract, but by then she had grown into too valuable a property to the studio.

Throughout the war Loos wrote screenplays, grew vegetables in her Victory garden and knitted socks and sweaters for the boys overseas. She also had houseguests Aldous and Maria Huxley, from England, when World War II began in September 1939. Loos convinced Huxley that it would be safer for his family if they stayed in the United States, and she got him a job adapting screenplays at MGM. Privately she had a new partner who had a drinking problem; the relationship would be short-lived and MGM decided to release her from her contract finally.

=== 1946–1959: Return to New York ===
In the fall of 1946, now a free agent, Loos returned to New York to work on Happy Birthday, a Saroyanesque cocktail party comedy written for Helen Hayes. The play had several false starts the previous year, but now proceeded with Joshua Logan as director, and produced by Rodgers and Hammerstein. It opened in Boston, but the audiences hated it at first. Loos kept improving the script throughout the Boston run; when it opened in New York at the Broadhurst it was a hit and ran for 600 performances. Katharine Hepburn was eager to play in the screen version but the Hollywood censors weren't ready for a woman to be "sloshed on screen for two acts and be rewarded with a happy ending." Loos sold her Santa Monica house to her niece and made certain Emerson understood he would not be joining her in New York under any circumstances.

Once again in New York, she and her long time friend, screenwriter Frances Marion, worked on an unproduced play for Zasu Pitts. A few romances came her way, including Maurice Chevalier. Two Broadway producers wanted a musical version of Gentlemen Prefer Blondes and brought in Joseph Fields as co-author. Loos threatened to quit the production unless assured she would never have to speak to Fields again. The show opened in Philadelphia with a then-unknown Carol Channing. By the time it arrived in New York it was another success. Channing soon was elevated to an A-list star, the show played for 90 weeks and went on tour for another year. The producers closed the show when Channing became pregnant. Herman Levin commented: "I was convinced the show wouldn't work without Carol, and in my opinion it never has." A musical film version was produced in 1953, directed by Howard Hawks and adapted by Charles Lederer. It starred Jane Russell and Marilyn Monroe. Loos had nothing to do with the production, but thought Monroe was inspired casting.

The success of Blondes the second time around meant Loos had a greater profile than ever before. She moved to a more spacious apartment at the Langdon Hotel and bought a car. In 1950 Loos wrote A Mouse is Born, another novel, and once it had been sent to her publisher, she left on her first trip to Europe in 20 years. A Mouse is Born had a lukewarm reception, but by then Loos was already working on a dramatic adaptation of Colette's Gigi. The production was under way before Colette wired that she had found their "Gigi"—she had seen Audrey Hepburn in a hotel lobby in Monte Carlo. Gigi opened in the fall of 1951 and would run until the spring of 1952; by then Hepburn had been elevated to an A-list star, contracted to Paramount Pictures.

Loos worked on more adaptations for the next few years during travels while relocating to an apartment on West Fifty-Seventh Street. The apartment was that of Paul Swan, the aging "Most Beautiful Man in the World". Her next musical, The Amazing Adele starring Tammy Grimes with music by Albert Selden, never got off the ground and swiftly closed. Both Emerson and Helen Hayes' husband, Charles MacArthur, died within a few weeks of each other and the women threw themselves into their work together, with Loos working on an adaptation for Hayes' filming Anastasia in London. Loos worked and traveled even while being treated for a painful hand ailment that prevented her from writing. In 1959 Loos opened another Colette adaptation, Chéri, with Kim Stanley and Horst Buchholz in the title roles, but it ran for only two months.

=== 1960–1981: Later life and death ===
Loos continued writing as a magazine contributor, appearing regularly in Harper's Bazaar, Vanity Fair and The New Yorker. Biographer Gary Carey notes: "She was a born storyteller and was always in peak form when reshaping a real-life encounter to make an amusing anecdote." Loos began a volume of memoirs, A Girl Like I, published in September 1966. Her 1972 book, Twice Over Lightly: New York Then and Now, was written in collaboration with friend and actress Helen Hayes. Kiss Hollywood Good-by (1974) was a Hollywood memoir about her MGM years and would be very successful, while her book, The Talmadge Girls (1978) is about the actress sisters Constance Talmadge and Norma Talmadge specifically.

Loos would become a virtual New York institution, an assiduous partygoer and diner-out; conspicuous at fashion shows, theatrical and movie events, balls and galas. A celebrity anecdotalist, she was also never one to let facts spoil a good story:

With each book came a new spate of interviews and as one of the last survivors of the silent era, Anita's stories became more exaggerated and she was soon reported to have sold her first scenario at the age of 12. She continued to thrive on interesting people and interesting activities – and held an opinion on everything – but worked hard on keeping the vivacious and flippant image and hiding her loneliness.

She once commented, "I've enjoyed my happiest moments when trailing a Mainbocher evening gown across the sawdust-covered floor of a saloon."

She was interviewed in the television documentary series Hollywood: A Celebration of the American Silent Film (1980).

After spending several weeks with a lung infection, Anita Loos suffered a heart attack and died in Manhattan's Doctors Hospital in New York City at the age of 93. At the memorial service, friends Helen Hayes, Ruth Gordon, and Lillian Gish, regaled the mourners with humorous anecdotes and Jule Styne played songs from Loos's musicals, including "Diamonds Are a Girl's Best Friend".

== In popular culture ==
- Loos is portrayed in a thinly disguised manner by Tatum O'Neal, as the character Alice Forsyte, in Peter Bogdanovich's look back at early silent filmmaking in the film Nickelodeon.
- In the second season of HBO's Perry Mason (2020 TV series) the character Anita St. Pierre, played by Jen Tullock, is based on Loos.

== Works ==
- Anita Loos Rediscovered: Film Treatments and Fiction by Anita Loos, Creator of Gentlemen Prefer Blondes

Author: Anita Loos
Editors: Cari Beauchamp, Mary Loos
Publisher : University of California Press, 2003
ISBN 9780520228948

=== Fiction ===
- Gentlemen Prefer Blondes: The Intimate Diary of a Professional Lady. NY: Boni & Liveright, 1925
- But Gentlemen Marry Brunettes. NY: Boni & Liveright, 1927
- A Mouse Is Born. NY: Doubleday & Company, 1951
- No Mother to Guide Her.

NY: McGraw Hill, 1961
London: Arthur Barker Ltd., 1961

- Fate Keeps On Happening: Adventures Of Lorelei Lee And Other Writings. NY: Dodd, Mead & Company, 1984

=== Nonfiction ===
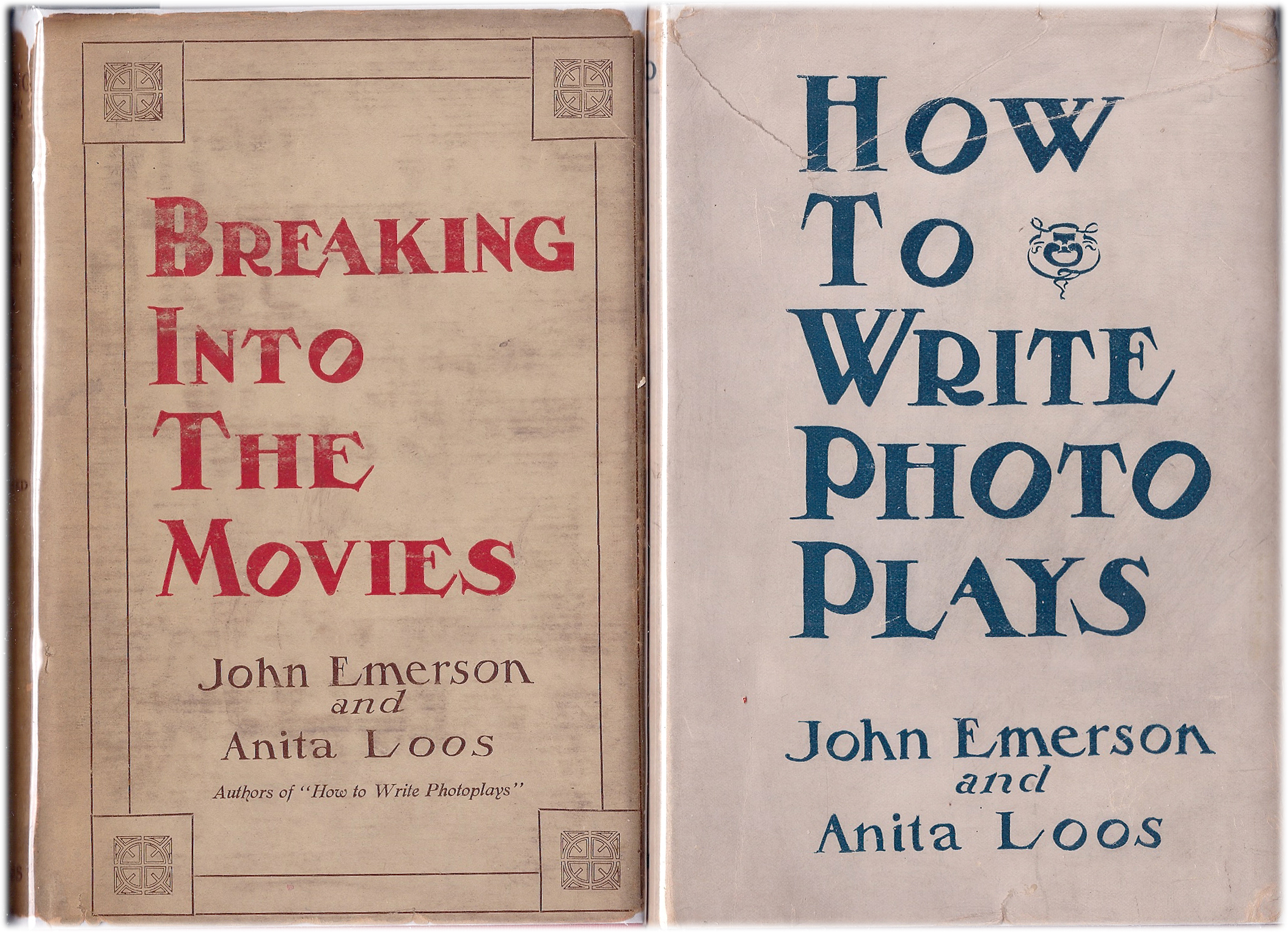
Loos' Nonfiction books

- w/John Emerson How to Write Photoplays NY: James A McCann, 1920
- w/John Emerson. Breaking Into the Movies. NY: James A McCann, 1921
- "This Brunette Prefers Work", Woman's Home Companion, 83 (March 1956)
- A Girl Like I. NY:Viking Press, 1966
- w/Helen Hayes. Twice Over Lightly: New York Then and Now. NY: Harcourt Brace Jovanovich, 1972
- Kiss Hollywood Good-by. NY: Viking Press, 1974
- Cast of Thousands: a pictorial memoir of the most glittering stars of Hollywood. NY: Grosset and Dunlap, 1977
- The Talmadge Girls. NY: Viking Press, 1978

=== Broadway credits ===
- The Whole Town's Talking (1923)
- The Fall of Eve (1925)
- Gentlemen Prefer Blondes (1926)
- The Social Register (1931)
- Happy Birthday (1946)
- Gentlemen Prefer Blondes (1949)
- Gigi (1951)
- Chéri (1959)
- The King's Mare (1967)
- Lorelei (1974)

=== Film credits ===
- My Baby (1912; writer)
- The Musketeers of Pig Alley (1912; writer)
- The New York Hat (1912; writer)
- A Narrow Escape (1913; scenario)
- The Wedding Gown (1913; scenario)
- His Hoodoo (1913; scenario; story "The Making of a Masher")
- Pa Says (1913; story "The Queen of the Carnival")
- A Cure for Suffragettes (1913; story)
- A Fallen Hero (1913; story)
- A Horse on Bill (1913; story)
- Binks' Vacation (1913; story)
- Highbrow Love (1913; story)
- How the Day Was Saved (1913; story)
- Oh, Sammy! (1913; story)
- The Hicksville Epicure (1913; story)
- The Power of the Camera (1913; story)
- The Suicide Pact (1913; story)
- His Awful Vengeance (1913; writer)
- The Lady in Black (1913 film) (1913; writer)
- The Mistake (1913; writer)
- The Telephone Girl and the Lady (1913; writer)
- The Widow's Kids (1913; writer)
- The Sisters (1914/I; scenario)
- A Lesson in Mechanics (1914; scenario)
- Nearly a Burglar's Bride (1914; scenario)
- Some Bull's Daughter (1914; scenario)
- The Deceiver (1914; scenario)
- The Road to Plaindale (1914; scenario)
- The Saving Grace (1914; scenario)
- The Saving Presence (1914; scenario)
- A Corner in Hats (1914; story)
- A Flurry in Art (1914; story)
- Gentleman or Thief (1914; story)
- Nell's Eugenic Wedding (1914; story)
- The Fatal Dress Suit (1914; story)
- The Man on the Couch (1914; story)
- The Million Dollar Bride (1914; story)
- The Gangsters of New York (1914; uncredited)
- A Bunch of Flowers (1914; writer)
- Billy's Rival (1914; writer)
- For Her Father's Sins (1914; writer)
- Izzy and His Rival (1914; writer)
- The Girl in the Shack (1914; writer)
- The Hunchback (1914; writer)
- The Last Drink of Whiskey (1914; writer)
- The White Slave Catchers (1914; writer)
- When the Road Parts (1914; writer)
- A Ten-Cent Adventure (1915; scenario)
- Mixed Values (1915; scenario)
- The Deacon's Whiskers (1915; scenario)
- The Lost House (1915; scenario)
- The Fatal Finger Prints (1915; writer)
- Stranded (1916/I; writer)
- Macbeth (1916; intertitles)
- A Calico Vampire (1916; scenario)
- Laundry Liz (1916; scenario)
- The French Milliner (1916; scenario)
- The Americano (1916; scenario; titles)
- The Wharf Rat (1916; screenplay; story)
- A Corner in Cotton (1916; story)
- American Aristocracy (1916; story)
- Intolerance: Love's Struggle Throughout the Ages (1916; titles)
- The Mystery of the Leaping Fish (1916; titles)
- A Wild Girl of the Sierras (1916; writer)
- His Picture in the Papers (1916; writer)
- The Children Pay (1916; writer)
- The Half-Breed (1916; writer)
- The Little Liar (1916; writer)
- The Matrimaniac (1916; writer)
- The Social Secretary (1916; writer)
- In Again, Out Again (1917/II; writer)
- A Daughter of the Poor (1917; writer)
- Down to Earth (1917; writer)
- Reaching for the Moon (1917; writer)
- Wild and Woolly (1917; writer)
- Good-Bye, Bill (1918; screenplay; producer; story Gosh Darn the Kaiser)
- Hit-The-Trail Holliday (1918; writer)
- Let's Get a Divorce (1918; writer)
- Come on In (1918; writer; producer)
- A Virtuous Vamp (1919; scenario)
- A Temperamental Wife (1919; scenario; producer)
- Oh, You Women! (1919; scenario; story)
- Under the Top (1919; story)
- Getting Mary Married (1919; writer)
- The Isle of Conquest (1919; writer)
- The Branded Woman (1920; adaptation)
- Dangerous Business (1920; producer; writer)
- Two Weeks (1920; scenario)
- The Perfect Woman (1920; screenplay; story)
- The Love Expert (1920; writer; producer)
- In Search of a Sinner (1920; writer; producer; uncredited)
- Woman's Place (1921; story)
- Mama's Affair (1921; writer)
- Polly of the Follies (1922; screenplay; story)
- Red Hot Romance (1922; screenplay; story; executive producer)
- Dulcy (1923; writer)
- Three Miles Out (1924; writer)
- Learning to Love (1925; screenplay; story)
- The Whole Town's Talking (1926; play)
- Stranded (1927; story)
- Gentlemen Prefer Blondes (1928; novel; screenplay; titles)
- The Fall of Eve (1929; story)
- Ex-Bad Boy (1931; story "The Whole Town's Talking")
- The Struggle (1931; writer)
- Blondie of the Follies (1932; dialogue)
- Red-Headed Woman (1932; writer)
- Hold Your Man (1933; screenplay; story)
- Midnight Mary (1933; story)
- The Barbarian (1933; writer)
- The Girl from Missouri (1934; original screenplay)
- The Cat and the Fiddle (1934; screenplay contributor; uncredited)
- Social Register (1934; story)
- Biography of a Bachelor Girl (1935; writer)
- Riffraff (1936; screenplay)
- San Francisco (1936; writer)
- Saratoga (1937; screenplay; story)
- Mama Steps Out (1937; writer)
- The Cowboy and the Lady (1938; contributing writer; uncredited)
- Another Thin Man (1939; contributing writer; uncredited)
- The Women (1939; screenplay)
- Babes in Arms (1939; uncredited)
- Strange Cargo (1940; adaptation; uncredited)
- Susan and God (1940; screenplay)
- Blossoms in the Dust (1941; screenplay)
- When Ladies Meet (1941; screenplay)
- They Met in Bombay (1941; writer)
- I Married an Angel (1942; screenplay)
- A Tree Grows in Brooklyn (1945 uncredited)
- The Buick Circus Hour (1952; teleplays)
- Gentlemen Prefer Blondes (1953; play)
- Gentlemen Marry Brunettes (1955; novel "But Gentlemen Marry Brunettes")
- Producers' Showcase "Happy Birthday" (1956; writer)

Loos.

== See also ==
- Mary Loos
