= Fritz Leiber (actor) =

American actor (1882–1949)

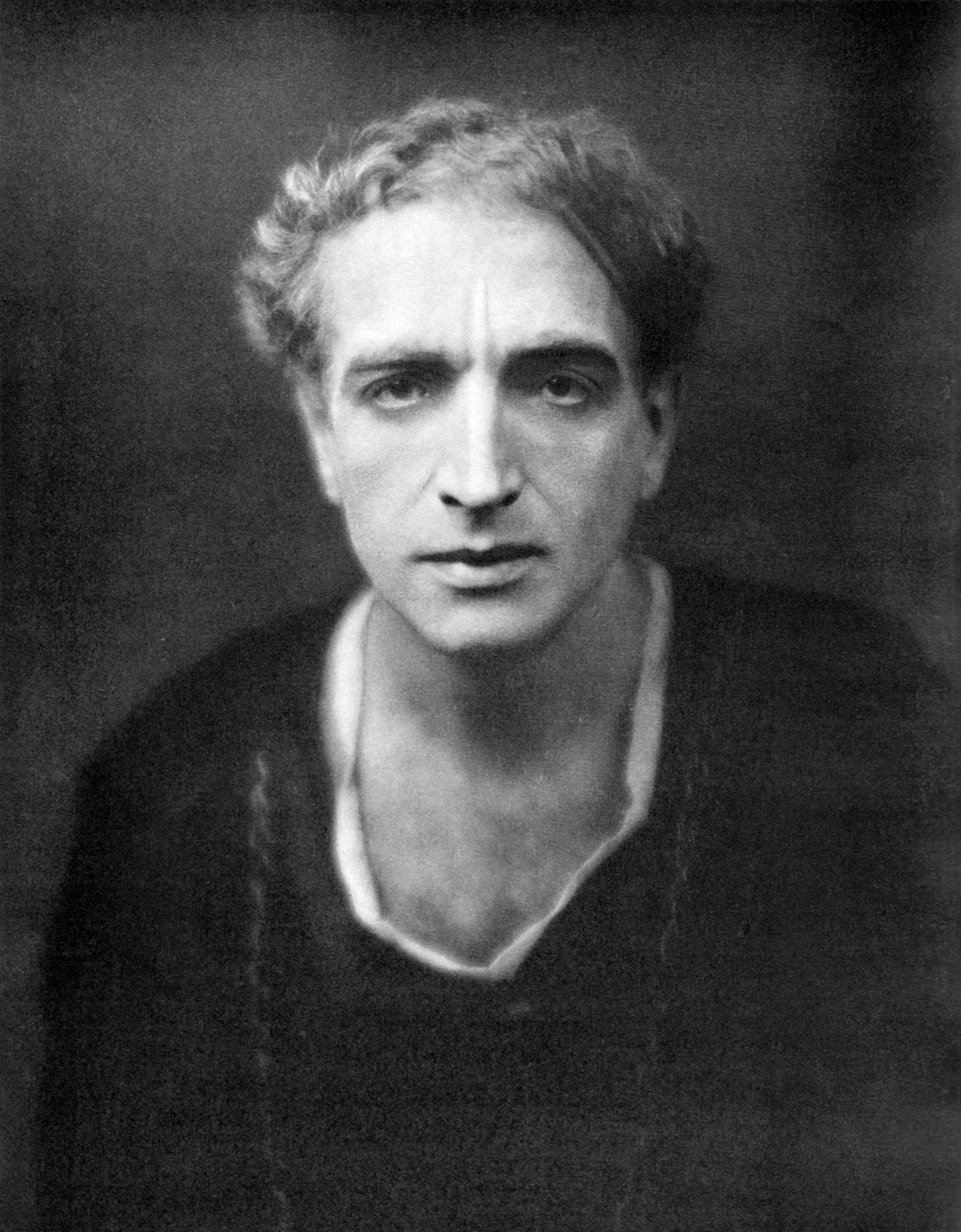
- Leiber in 1930, photo by Ethel Standiford
- Born: Fritz Reuter Leiber; 31 January 1882; Chicago, Illinois, U.S.
- Died: 14 October 1949 (aged 67); Hollywood, California, U.S.
- Occupation: Actor
- Years active: 1916–1949
- Spouse: Virginia Bronson (m. 1910)
- Children: Fritz Leiber

Fritz Reuter Leiber Sr. (/ˈlaɪbər/ LY-bər; January 31, 1882 – October 14, 1949) was an American actor. A Shakespearean actor on stage, he also had a successful career in film. He was the father of science fiction and fantasy writer Fritz Leiber Jr., who was also an actor for a time.

== Life ==
Leiber was born in Chicago, the son of German emigrant parents Meta (Klett) and Albrecht Leiber. His father was from Baden-Baden and his mother was from Mecklenburg. Leiber was based in Chicago for most of his pre-Hollywood career. He married Virginia Bronson (1885–1970), who like him was a Shakespearean performer.

== Career ==
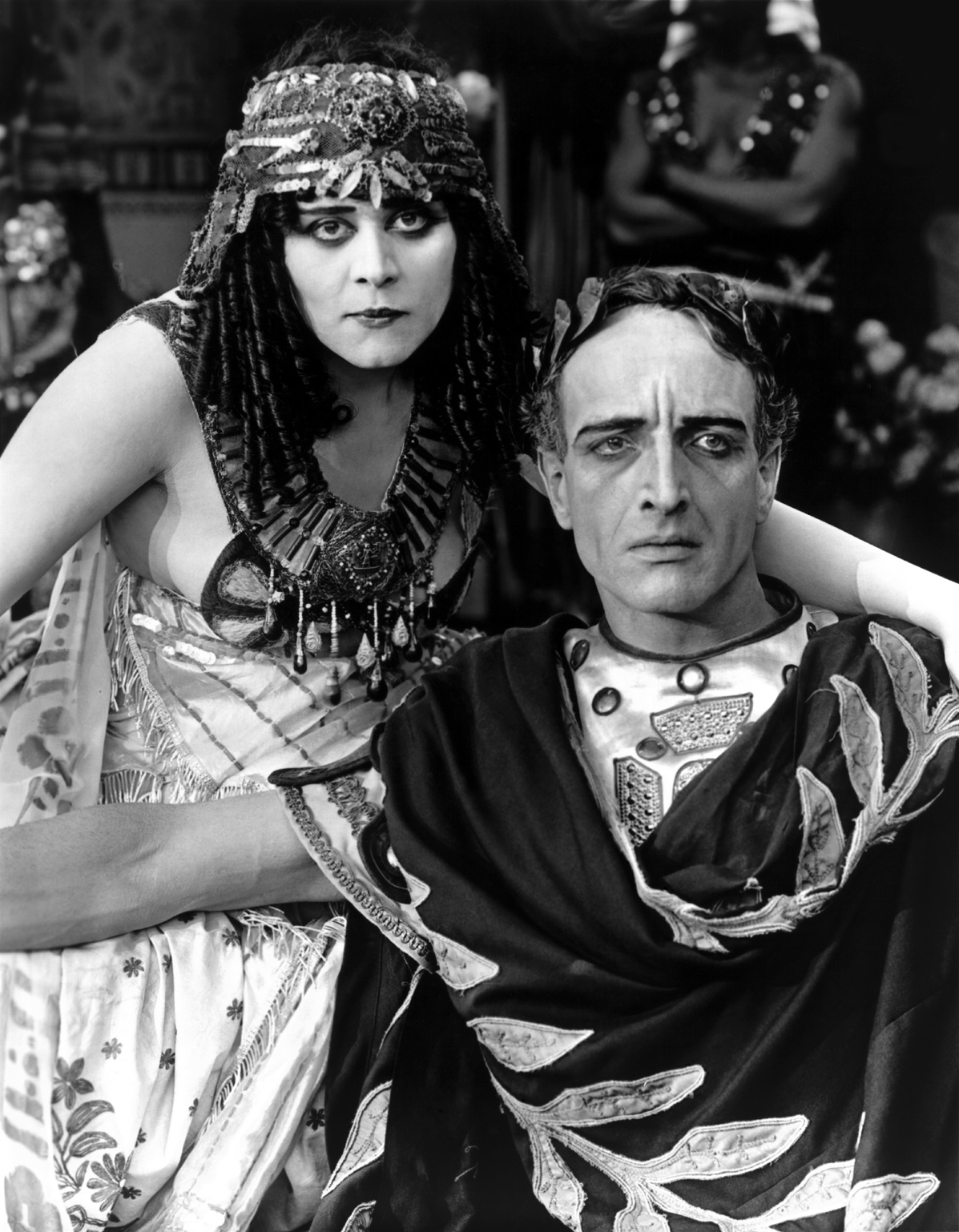
Fritz Leiber as Caesar with Theda Bara in Cleopatra (1917)

Leiber and his wife spent much of their time touring in a Shakespearian acting company, known by the 1930s as Fritz Leiber & Co. Leiber made his film debut in 1916, playing Mercutio in the Francis X. Bushman version of Romeo and Juliet.

His many silent-era portrayals included Caesar in Theda Bara's 1917 Cleopatra and Solomon in the mammoth 1921 Betty Blythe vehicle The Queen of Sheba.

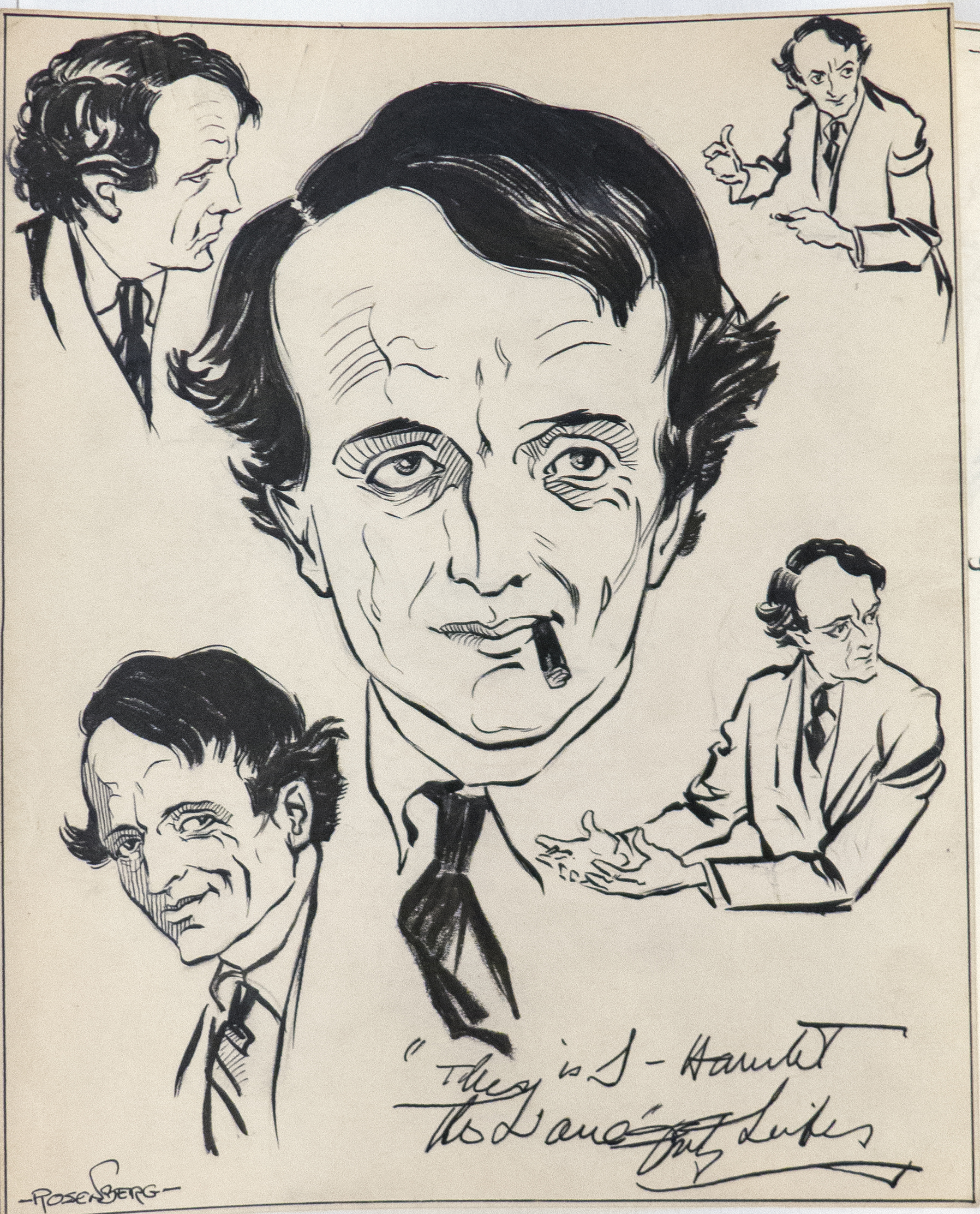
Fritz Leiber autographed drawing by Manuel Rosenberg for the Cincinnati Post, 1919

Leiber thrived as a character actor in sound films, usually in historical roles. His piercing eyes and shock of white hair allowed him to convincingly play a variety of characters, including priests, professors, musical professors, and religious fanatics.

In the film Champagne Waltz (1937), he portrayed an orchestra maestro; the role required him to play classical music on a violin and jazz on a clarinet. One of Leiber's larger assignments of the 1940s, and his most notable musical role, was as Franz Liszt in the Claude Rains remake of Phantom of the Opera (1943). He played a dead chemist in the movie Angel on My Shoulder (1946). He performed briefly opposite Charles Chaplin as the priest who visits Monsieur Verdoux (1947) in his prison cell.

Leiber appeared together with his son Fritz Leiber, Jr. in the wedding-feast scene of Greta Garbo's film Camille (1936), in Warner Bros.' The Great Garrick (1937), and in The Hunchback of Notre Dame (1939) (in which Fritz, Jr. was uncredited).

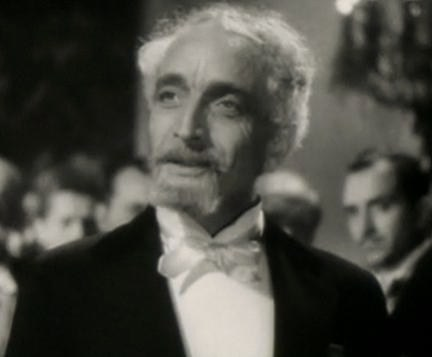
Fritz Leiber in The Story of Louis Pasteur trailer

== Portrait collection ==
Often during his career Leiber had a likeness made of himself in costume and make-up for the role he was then playing, varying the format and media to include oil painting, charcoal sketching; a sculpted bust, a clay bas-relief, and others. After the actor's death, the collection passed to his son, Fritz Leiber Jr., who used the experience of inheriting this surfeit as the basis of his 1963 story "237 Talking Statues, Etc." The two Fritz Leibers also physically resembled each other enough to give casual visitors the impression that the portraits were of Leiber Jr. himself.

== Death ==
Leiber died in Hollywood, from a heart attack at the age of 67.

== Filmography ==
- Romeo and Juliet (1916) .... Mercutio
- The Primitive Call (1917) .... Brain Elkhorn
- Cleopatra (1917) .... Caesar
- If I Were King (1920) .... Louis XI
- The Song of the Soul (1920) .... Jerry Wendover
- The Queen of Sheba (1921) .... King Solomon
- A Tale of Two Cities (1935) .... Gaspard
- The Story of Louis Pasteur (1936) .... Dr. Charbonnet
- Under Two Flags (1936) .... French Governor
- Hearts in Bondage (1936) .... Capt. John Ericsson
- Down to the Sea (1936) .... Gregory Pappas
- Sins of Man (1936) .... Father Prior
- Anthony Adverse (1936) .... Ouvrard
- Champagne Waltz (1937) .... Franz Strauss
- Under Southern Stars (1937, Short) .... Stonewall Jackson
- The Prince and the Pauper (1937) .... Father Andrew
- The Great Garrick (1937) .... Horatio
- The Jury's Secret (1938) .... John Morrow
- Flight into Nowhere (1938) .... Ti-Ana
- Gateway (1938) .... Dr. Weilander
- They Made Her a Spy (1939) .... Dr. Krull
- Nurse Edith Cavell (1939) .... Sadi Kirschen
- Pack Up Your Troubles (1939) .... Pierre Ferrand
- The Hunchback of Notre Dame (1939) .... Old Nobleman
- The Way of All Flesh (1940) .... Max
- The Sea Hawk (1940) .... Inquisitor
- All This, and Heaven Too (1940) .... Abbe Gallard
- Lady with Red Hair (1940) .... Mr. Foster
- Aloma of the South Seas (1941) .... High Priest
- Crossroads (1942) .... Foreign Minister Deval (uncredited)
- First Comes Courage (1943) .... Dr. Aanrud
- Salute to the Marines (1943) .... Mr. Agno (uncredited)
- Phantom of the Opera (1943) .... Franz Liszt
- The Desert Song (1943) .... Ben Sidi (uncredited)
- The Impostor (1944) .... Priest
- Cobra Woman (1944) .... Venreau (uncredited)
- Cry of the Werewolf (1944) .... Dr. Charles Morris
- Youth Runs Wild (1944) .... Judge (uncredited)
- The Cisco Kid Returns (The Daring Adventurer) (1945) .... The Padre
- Son of Lassie (1945) .... Village Padre (uncredited)
- The Spanish Main (1945) .... Bishop
- This Love of Ours (1945) .... Dr. Bailey
- Scarlet Street (1945) .... Evangelist (uncredited)
- A Scandal in Paris (1946) .... Painter
- Angel on My Shoulder (1946) .... Chemist Who Poisoned Wife (uncredited)
- Strange Journey (1946) .... Prof. Jenner
- Humoresque (1946) .... Hagerstrom
- Monsieur Verdoux (1947) .... Father Fareaux
- Bells of San Angelo (1947) .... Padre
- Dangerous Venture (1947) .... Xeoli
- The Web (1947) .... Leopold Kroner
- High Conquest (1947) .... Priest
- Adventures of Casanova (1948) .... D'Anneci
- To the Ends of the Earth (1948) .... Binda Sha
- Another Part of the Forest (1948) .... Colonel Isham
- Inner Sanctum (1948) .... Dr. Valonius
- Song of India (1949) .... Nanaram
- Bride of Vengeance (1949) .... Filippo
- Bagdad (1949) .... Emir
- Samson and Delilah (1949) .... Lord Sharif
- Devil's Doorway (1950) .... Mr. Poole (final film role)
