= John W. Boyle =

American cinematographer (1891–1959)

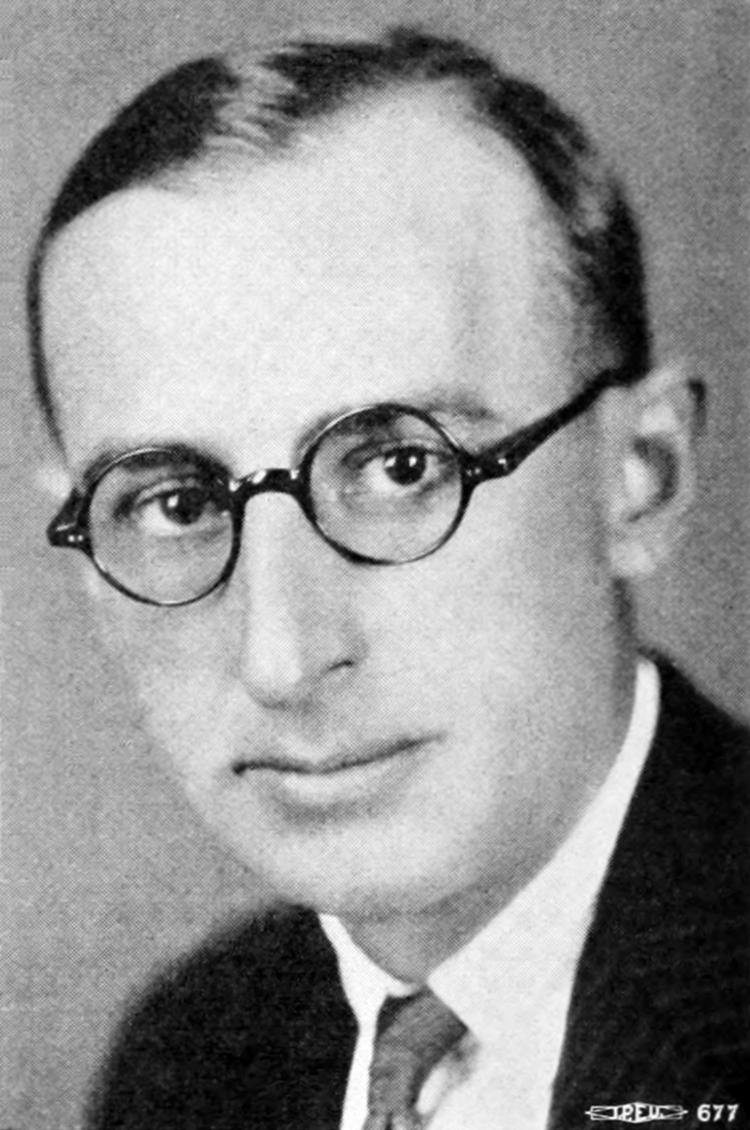
- John W. Boyle in 1931
- Born: September 1, 1891; Memphis, Tennessee United States
- Died: September 28, 1959 (aged 68); Hollywood, California, United States
- Occupation: Cinematographer
- Years active: 1915–57
- Spouse: Lillian P. Boyle

John W. Boyle (September 1, 1891 – September 28, 1959), was an American cinematographer whose career spanned from the silent era through the 1950s. Over his career he would photograph more than 150 films, including features, shorts and documentaries. He would also work on several British films over the course of his career.

== Life and career ==
John W. Boyle was born in Memphis, Tennessee, on September 1, 1891. He entered the film industry in 1915, when he shot three films, Greater Love Hath No Man, Her Great Match and My Madonna. In 1917 he photographed the silent classic, Cleopatra, starring Theda Bara. The film is on the American Film Institute's "Ten Most Wanted" list of lost American films. J. Gordon Edwards helmed the film, and the two would work together on 22 other films over the following 12 years, including such classics as Salomé and When a Woman Sins, both again starring Bara, and The Queen of Sheba, starring Betty Blythe.

During his long career, Boyle filmed over 70 feature-length motion pictures in the United States and Great Britain. He filmed several documentaries and also produced one of them, Sweden, Land of the Vikings. Between 1928 and 1933 Boyle worked on short films, many of them produced by Mack Sennett. Boyle was president of the American Society of Cinematographers (ASC) from 1928 to 1929.

Boyle died on September 28, 1959, in Hollywood, California.

== Filmography ==
Boyle's filmography is listed in the databases of the American Film Institute and British Film Institute.

- Her Great Match (1915)
- The Fall of a Nation (1916)
- The Yellow Passport (1916)
- The Rose of Blood (1917)
- Kick In (1917)
- Cleopatra (1917)
- Madame Du Barry (1917)
- The Forbidden Path (1918)
- The She-Devil (1918)
- The Soul of Buddha (1918)
- Under the Yoke (1918)
- When a Woman Sins (1918)
- Salome (1918)
- The Siren's Song (1919)
- When Men Desire (1919)
- The Last of the Duanes (1919)
- The Lone Star Ranger (1919)
- A Woman There Was (1919)
- Wings of the Morning (1919)
- Heart Strings (1920)
- The Adventurer (1920)
- A Manhattan Knight (1920)
- The Orphan (1920)
- If I Were King (1920)
- Drag Harlan (1920)
- The Scuttlers (1920)
- The Joyous Troublemaker (1920)
- The Scuttlers (1920)
- Drag Harlan (1920)
- The Queen of Sheba (1921)
- A Dangerous Adventure (1922)
- The Golden Gift (1922)
- Slave of Desire (1923)
- Wild Oranges (1924)
- Excuse Me (1925)
- The Keeper of the Bees (1925)
- The Far Cry (1926)
- The Greater Glory (1926)
- Her Second Chance (1926)
- Miss Nobody (1926)
- Topsy and Eva (1927)
- The Perfect Sap (1927)
- The Masked Woman (1927)
- Skyscraper (1928)
- Smith's Burglar (1928)
- Tropical Nights (1928)
- The Good-Bye Kiss (1928)
- Broadway Fever (1929)
- Danger Lights (1929)
- The Spirit of Youth (1929)
- Midnight Daddies (1930)
- Danger Lights (1930)
- Hypnotized (1932)
- Sundown Rider (1932)
- USC vs. Tulane (1932)
- Roman Scandals (1933)
- Treason (1933)
- The Barber Shop (1933)
- Man of Action (1933)
- Gridiron Flash (1934)
- Sweden, Land of the Vikings (1934)
- Honeymoon Limited (1935)
- Strangers All (1935)
- Laburnum Grove (1936)
- Queen of Hearts (1936)
- Land Without Music (1936)
- Midshipman Easy (1936)
- Keep Your Seats, Please (1936)
- Keep Fit (1937)
- Jericho (1937)
- Outlaws of the Prairie (1937)
- Newsboys' Home (1938)
- Cattle Raiders (1938)
- The Gentleman from Arizona (1939)
- Hero for a Day (1939)
- Society Smugglers (1939)
- Mutiny on the Blackhawk (1939)
- Mystery of the White Room (1939)
- Mysore (1940)
- The Devil's Pipeline (1940)
- Give Us Wings (1940)
- Burma Convoy (1941)
- Flying Cadets (1941)
- The Kid from Kansas (1941)
- Men of the Timberland (1941)
- Mutiny in the Arctic (1941)
- Six Lessons from Madame La Zonga (1941)
- Raiders of the Desert (1941)
- Mr. Dynamite (1941)
- Double Date (1941)
- Where Did You Get That Girl? (1941)
- Halfway to Shanghai (1942)
- Strictly in the Groove (1942)
- Destination Unknown (1942)
- Juke Box Jenny (1942)
- Mississippi Gambler (1942)
- Ride 'Em Cowboy (1942)
- There's One Born Every Minute (1942)
- Unseen Enemy (1942)
- Hi, Buddy (1943)
- Jack London (1943)
- Always a Bridesmaid (1943)
- He's My Guy (1943)
- Good Morning, Judge (1943)
- Song of the Open Road (1944)
- The Bridge of San Luis Rey (1944)
- Gallant Bess (1947)
- The Fabulous Joe (1947)
- Curley (1947)
- Here Comes Trouble (1948)
- Mickey (1948)
- Northwest Stampede (1948)
- Who Killed Doc Robbin (1948)
- Carson City (1952)
- The Three-D Follies (1953)
- Jamboree (1954)
- Courage of Black Beauty (1957)
- The Restless Breed (1957)
