= The She-Devil =

1918 silent film directed by J. Gordon Edwards

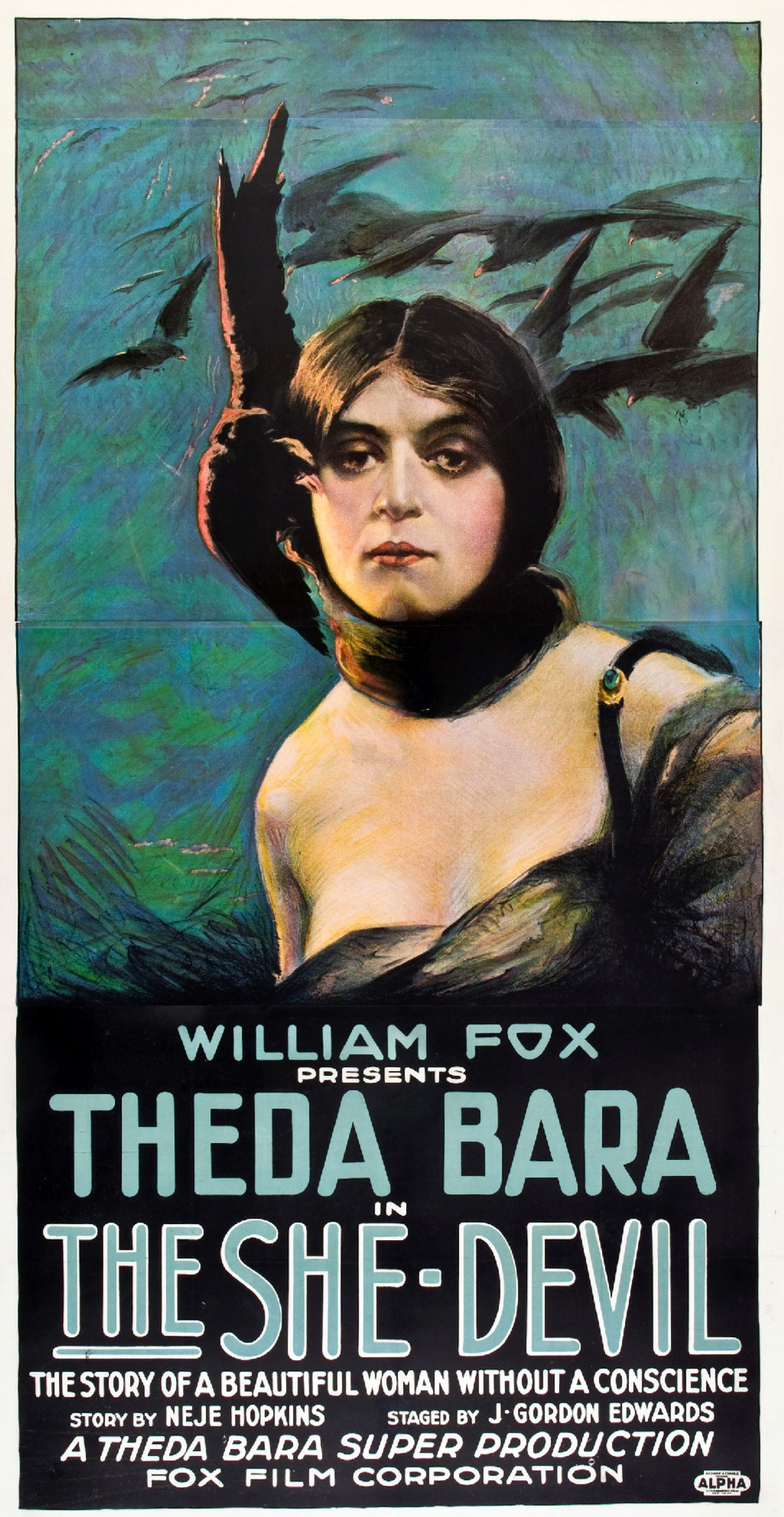
- Theatrical poster for The She-Devil
- Directed by: J. Gordon Edwards
- Written by: J. Gordon Edwards (scenario)
- Screenplay by: George James Hopkins
- Story by: George James Hopkins
- Produced by: William Fox
- Starring: Theda Bara; Albert Roscoe
- Cinematography: John W. Boyle; Harry Gerstad
- Distributed by: Fox Film Corporation
- Release date: November 10, 1918
- Running time: 6 reels
- Country: United States
- Language: Silent (English intertitles)

The She-Devil is a 1918 American silent romantic drama film directed by J. Gordon Edwards and starring Theda Bara. This was the last film in which Alan Roscoe starred with Theda Bara; they appeared in six films together starting with Camille.

== Plot ==
As described in a film magazine, Lolette (Bara), a siren in a Spanish village, falls in love with travelling artist Maurice Taylor (Roscoe) although he does not desire her and makes up her mind to win him. She flaunts all of the other men in the village when they try to woo her, and, after Maurice leaves for Paris, she lures the Tiger (McDaniel) to win her by money and jewels. He robs the stage coach, and while he sleeps she robs him of everything and leaves. She finds Maurice in Paris and takes up her abode with him. Lolette overdresses and attracts undesirable attention. Maurice takes her to see the Spanish dancers at the theater. She leaps onto the stage and surpasses the professional dancers. The Tiger is in the audience and follows them home. While Maurice is absent, the Tiger enters the room and forces Lolette to give him the jewels. But before he leaves, she turns the tables on him and gets the jewels back while the Tiger escapes. Lolette signs to dance for every manager in Paris, and Maurice is forced to take her back to the small village to live in retirement until this breach of business contracting etiquette can be forgotten. There she once again meets the Tiger, who imprisons Maurice. In order to save her lover, Lolette flirts with the Tiger and persuades him to give a banquet and forgive her. She gets him intoxicated and binds him to a chair, releases her lover, and they escape.

== Cast ==
- Theda Bara as Lolette
- Albert Roscoe as Maurice Taylor
- Frederick Bond as Apollo
- George A. McDaniel as The Tiger

== Reception ==
Like many American films of the time, The She-Devil was subject to restrictions and cuts by city and state film censorship boards. For example, the Chicago Board of Censors required a cut, in Reel 2, of the first holdup scene and, in Reel 5, of the first holdup scene.

== Preservation status ==
This film is now considered to be a lost film.

== See also ==
- List of lost films
- 1937 Fox vault fire
