= Danger Lights =

1930 film

- DVD cover
- Directed by: George B. Seitz
- Written by: James Ashmore Creelman
- Produced by: William LeBaron; Myles Connolly (assoc.)
- Starring: Louis Wolheim; Robert Armstrong; Jean Arthur
- Cinematography: Karl Struss; John W. Boyle
- Edited by: Archie F. Marshek
- Distributed by: RKO Pictures
- Release dates: November 15, 1930 (Premiere-Chicago); December 12, 1930 (U.S.)
- Running time: 74 minutes (original); 55 minutes (television edit)
- Country: United States
- Language: English

Danger Lights, original version (full film, public domain)

Danger Lights, TV version

Danger Lights is a 1930 American pre-Code drama film, directed by George B. Seitz, from a screenplay by James Ashmore Creelman. It stars Louis Wolheim, Robert Armstrong, and Jean Arthur.

The plot concerns railroading on the Chicago, Milwaukee, St. Paul and Pacific Railroad (Milwaukee Road), and the movie was largely filmed along that railroad's lines in Montana. The railway yard in Miles City, Montana, was a primary setting, while rural scenes were shot along the railway line through Sixteen Mile Canyon, Montana. Additional footage was shot in Chicago, Illinois (where the Milwaukee Road was headquartered until 1986, when it went out of business). The film was the first ever shot in the new Spoor-Berggren Natural Vision Process.

In 1958, the film entered the public domain in the United States because the claimants did not renew its copyright registration in the 28th year after publication.

== Plot ==
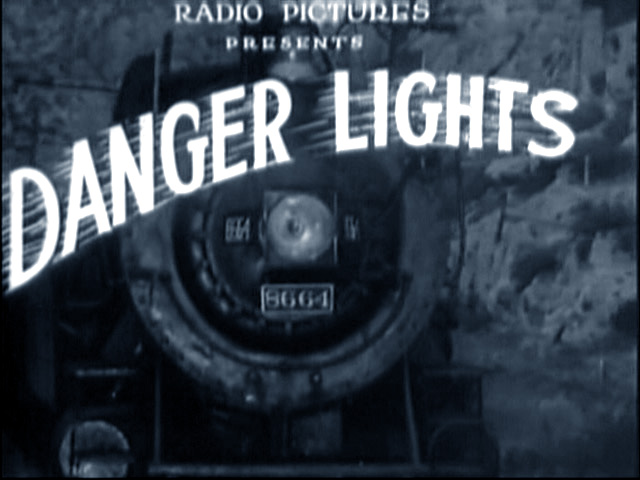
Screenshot from the film.

Dan Thorn is a divisional boss on the Milwaukee Railroad, based in Miles City, Montana. The film opens with a landslide across the track and Thorn dispatching, then accompanying, a repair crew to clear it. Several hobos are lounging nearby and are put to work helping the crew. Thorn discovers that one of the hobos, Larry Doyle, is a former railroad engineer who lost his job over insubordination. Thorn finds he likes the man and demands that he better his life by returning to work for the railroad. Doyle repeatedly refuses even as he starts the work, but Thorn is a hard man to say no to, and Doyle is hired.

Thorn is engaged to Mary Ryan, but his job leaves him unable to give her much time or attention. When an engineer's wife dies, Thorn spends time with the man to keep him from getting drunk and endangering his railroad job. This leaves Thorn unable to attend a social event, so he asks Doyle to go with Mary instead. Afterwards, at night, the two are using a long railway bridge to walk home when a fast train approaches. Doyle whisks Mary into a trackside refuge and kisses her as the train rushes by.

Mary still cares for Thorn, but she falls in love with Doyle. Finally he persuades her to run away to Chicago with him and get married. That night, as they walk along the tracks through a rain storm toward the station, Doyle's foot becomes trapped in a railroad switch as it is remotely reset for the train. At this point Thorn approaches and threatens Doyle over Mary, but when he realizes the man is trapped, he manages to pull Doyle clear of the switch at the last moment. Doyle is safe but Thorn is hit by the train and seriously injured.

The local doctor says Thorn will die unless he can be taken to Chicago for brain surgery within five hours, which would require breaking the speed record for the trip. Doyle volunteers to drive a special train and is able to accomplish the feat. Thorn is saved.

Two weeks later, Thorn is taken back to Miles City by train, conscious but depressed. At the station, Mary is the first to board, and promises to return to him. But Thorn says that during his enforced rest he has come to realize that he is already married—to the railroad. He frees her to marry Doyle with his blessing. Then, overhearing railwaymen outside speaking as if he is done for, he shouts at them to get back to work. They do, and his depression lifts.

== Cast ==
- Louis Wolheim as Dan Thorn
- Robert Armstrong as Larry Doyle
- Jean Arthur as Mary Ryan
- Hugh Herbert as Professor
- Frank Sheridan as Ed Ryan
- Robert Edeson as Tom Johnson
- Alan Roscoe as Jim
- William P. Burt as Chief Dispatcher
- James Farley as Joe Geraghty

(Cast list as per AFI database)

== Notes ==
Danger Lights was filmed during a period when some movie studios were experimenting with various widescreen film formats. As part of this trend, two versions of the film were created. One used standard 35mm film and Academy ratio, and the other used an experimental 65mm widescreen format at a 2:1 aspect ratio. This latter process was called "Natural Vision" and was invented by film pioneers George Kirke Spoor and P. John Berggren. The Natural Vision print of the film was reportedly screened at only two theaters (the only two with the equipment necessary to show the film), the State Lake Theater in Chicago and the Mayfair Theater in New York, and no copies of it are known to exist today. Danger Lights is the only film created using this process, and the entire effort to move to wide-screen was shelved for several decades because of the increased costs of both production and presentation. The film was taken two years after the Milwaukee Road exited bankruptcy and five years before it re-entered bankruptcy and placed under trusteeship. Ten years after the second bankruptcy, the Milwaukee Road emerged from bankruptcy until it fell into bankruptcy the third time in 1977 (the railroad's first bankruptcy was filed in 1925) and sold to the Soo Line Railroad in 1986. The Soo Line was absorbed by the Canadian Pacific Railway in 1990, with the latter combining with the Kansas City Southern Railway thirty-three years posterior to form Canadian Pacific Kansas City Limited, or CPKC.

=== Historically significant footage ===
Danger Lights features rare footage of a tug of war between two steam locomotives, actual documentary footage of the activities in the Miles City yard, and what is believed to be the only motion picture footage of a dynamometer car from the steam railroad era in the USA. Similar footage may have existed in MGM's Thunder (1929), with Lon Chaney, but that film now exists only in fragments, making it partly a lost film.

In 1958, the film entered the public domain in the United States because the claimants did not renew its copyright registration in the 28th year after publication.

Danger Lights was edited down to 55 minutes for television broadcast; this version is freely available for download. In 2009 Alpha Video released the original 74-minute version on DVD.
