= Salomé (1918 film) =

1918 film by J. Gordon Edwards

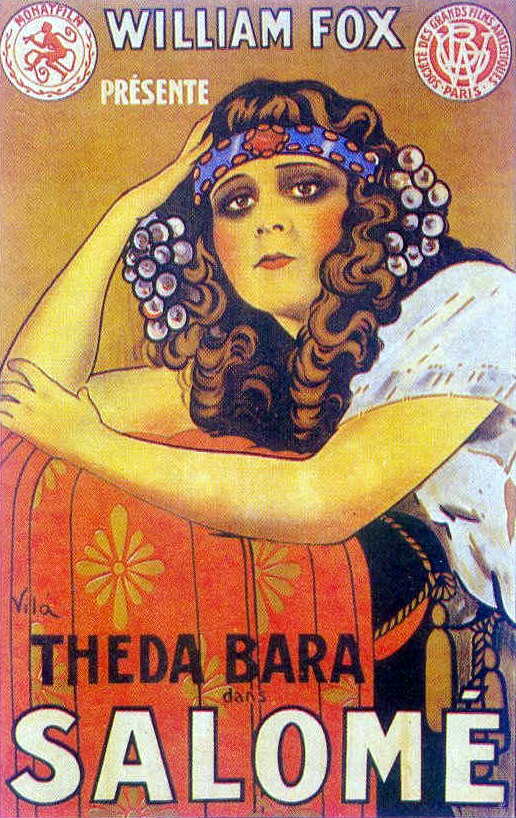
- Film poster
- Directed by: J. Gordon Edwards
- Written by: Adrian Johnson (scenario); Oscar Wilde (play Salome)
- Story by: Flavius Josephus
- Produced by: William Fox
- Starring: Theda Bara; G. Raymond Nye; Alan Roscoe; Bertram Grassby
- Cinematography: John W. Boyle
- Distributed by: Fox Film Corporation
- Release date: October 6, 1918
- Running time: 80 minutes (8 reels)
- Country: United States
- Language: Silent (English intertitles)

Salomé is a 1918 American silent drama film directed by J.Gordon Edwards, and produced by William Fox. The film starred Theda Bara, G. Raymond Nye, and Alan Roscoe.

== Plot ==
As described in a film magazine, Salome uses her wiles in pursuit of King Herod, whose power she desires. She has disposed of Herod's chief rival, and causes his wife to be killed through her own treachery. John the Baptist, who has secured a hold on the people, denounces Herod and his court. Herod has John thrown in jail for fomenting sedition. There Salome meets him, and becomes crazed with passion, but when John rejects her she seeks revenge. With a sensuous dance she gains the approval of Herod, and demands John's head as her reward. This act brings her own punishment when she is crushed to death beneath the sharp spokes on the shields of the Roman legionnaires.

== Cast ==
- Theda Bara as Salome
- G. Raymond Nye as King Herod
- Alan Roscoe as John the Baptist
- Herbert Heyes as Sejanus (Heyes' final of five films with Bara)
- Bertram Grassby as Prince David
- Genevieve Blinn as Queen Marian
- Vera Doria as Naomi
- Alfred Fremont as Galla

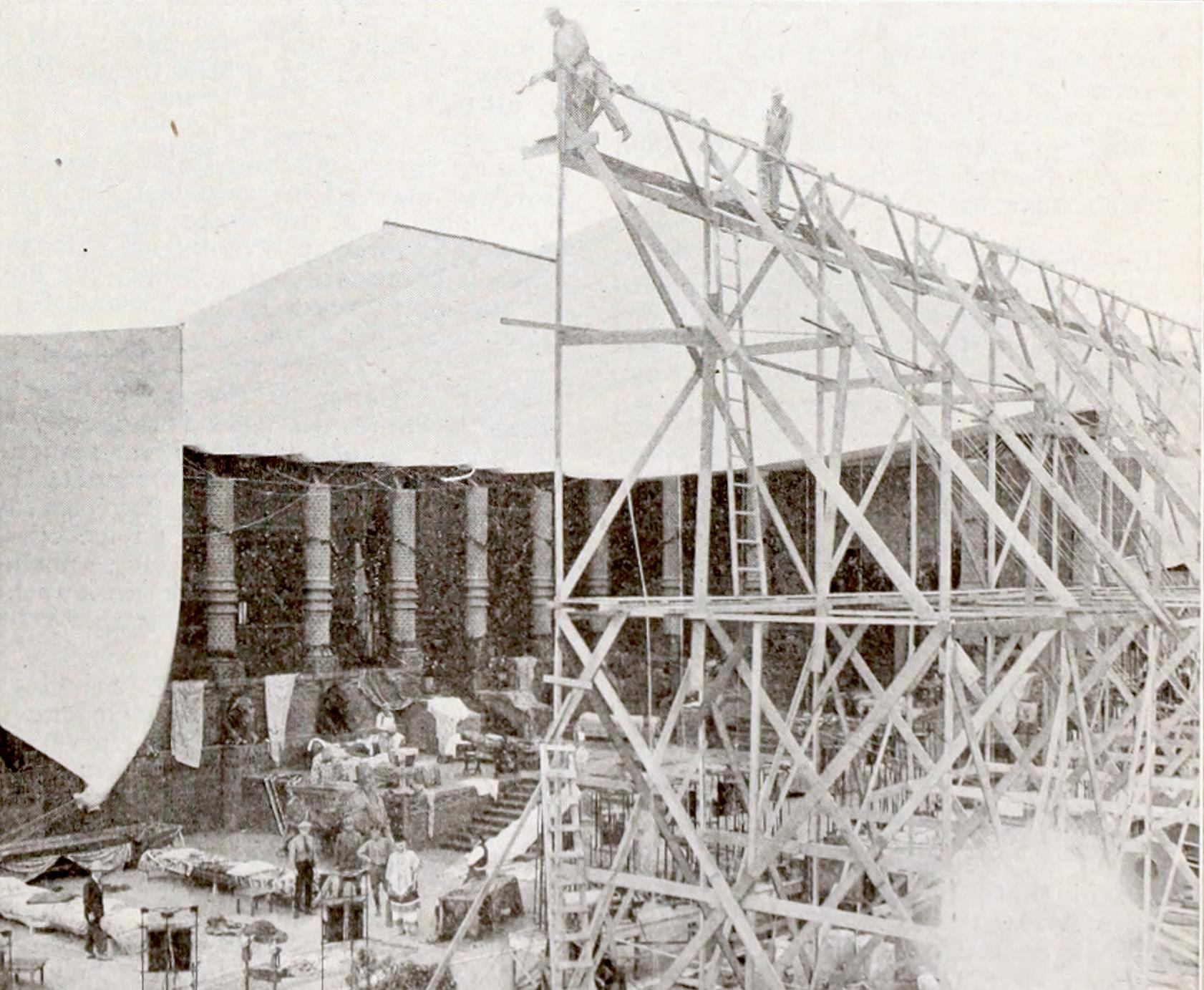
One of the sets used to film the movie.

== Production notes ==
Portions of the film were shot in Palm Springs, California.

== Reception ==
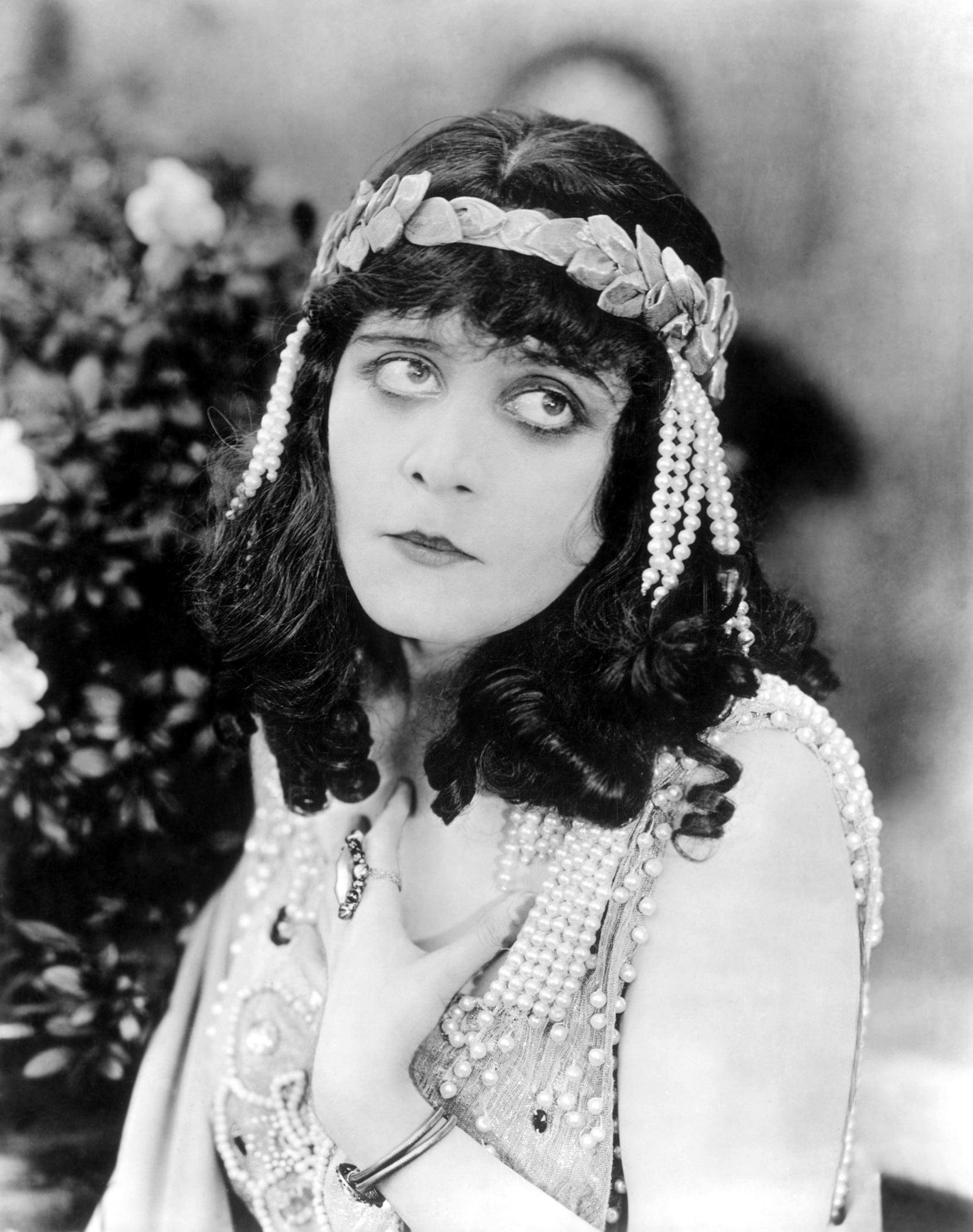
Theda Bara in Salomé

Although the film proved to be popular with some theaters charging extra for tickets to see it, Salomé also proved to be controversial. For example, St. Louis, Missouri churches of varying denominations organized to protest the showing of the film. They objected not only to Bara's attire, but also to the divergence of the plot from Biblical text, such as scenes where John the Baptist was preaching in Jerusalem and where Salome declares her love to John, and to the youthful appearance of John. Objections were also made that children were attending showings of the film. In response, director Edwards stated that his Salomé was not based upon any single version of the story, but was a combination of many versions and used poetic license. Edwards also noted the film had a "big, moral lesson" since "Salome, according to a consensus of literary opinion, was the wanton creature criminal history has given us" and who "drove the most diabolical bargain that has ever been known" by bartering "a dance for the head of a man."

Like many American films of the time, Salomé was subject to restrictions and cuts by city and state film censorship boards. For example, the Chicago Board of Censors required a cut, in Reel 5, of a closeup of Salome in a litter where she raises her arm and exposes a breast, Reel 6, scene of executioner's sword descending, and, Reel 8, in two scenes where Salome is shown bending over dungeon, portions of film where her breasts are exposed.

== Preservation ==
Salomé was considered to be a lost film, until 2 minutes worth of fragments were rediscovered on October 2, 2021 and uploaded to Vimeo. They are held by the Filmoteca Española.

Fragments of Salome

The last known copy of this film was nearly saved in the early 1940's by French film preservationist and historian Henri Langlois for deposit at the Cinematheque francaise. He had the opportunity to buy this film but dismissed it as he felt that the film was not considered a classic and it later became lost. He subsequently realized his lost chance and regretted prejudging which films as worthy of preserving, deciding instead to preserve whatever film he was able to.

== In popular culture ==
A scene in the 1918 film The Cook, starring Roscoe "Fatty" Arbuckle and Buster Keaton, spoofs parts of this movie, with Arbuckle dressing in drag and doing his best "Salomé" impression.

== See also ==
- List of American films of 1918
- List of lost films
- 1937 Fox vault fire
