= Alan Roscoe =

American actor (1886–1933)

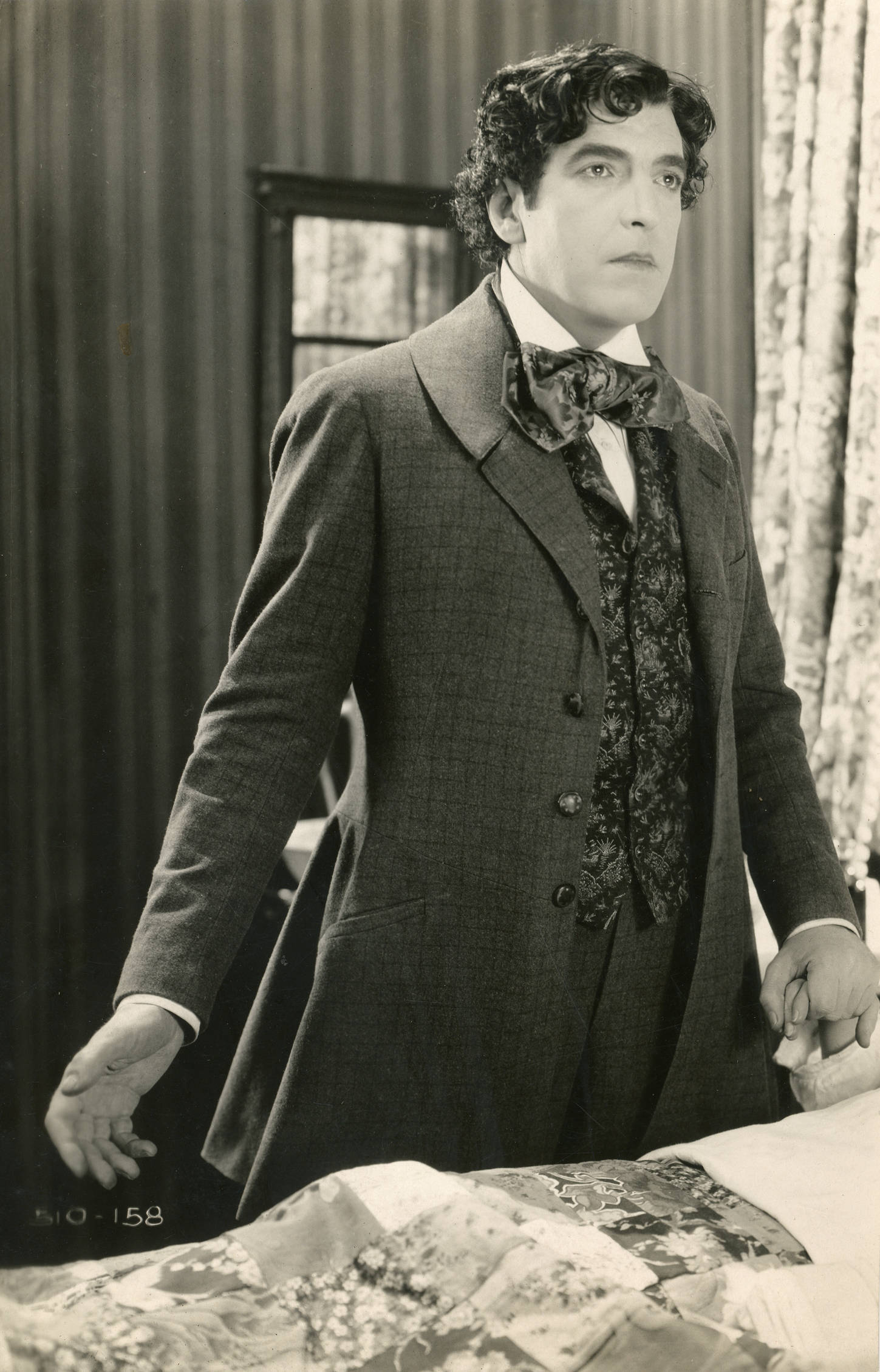
- Roscoe in 1923
- Born: John Albert Rascoe; August 23, 1888
- Died: March 8, 1933 (aged 44); Los Angeles, California, U.S.
- Resting place: Forest Lawn Memorial Park Cemetery
- Occupation: Actor
- Years active: 1915–1933
- Spouse: Barbara Bedford
- Children: 1

Alan Roscoe (born John Albert Rascoe; August 23, 1888 – March 8, 1933) was an American film actor of the silent and early talking film eras. He appeared in more than 100 films between 1915 and 1933.

Roscoe was born John Albert Rascoe on August 23, 1888. He died of cancer on March 8, 1933, in Los Angeles. His interment was in Glendale's Forest Lawn Memorial Park Cemetery.

Roscoe married actress Barbara Bedford in 1921. They had a daughter and divorced in 1928. In 1930 they filed notice of their plans to marry again.

== Partial filmography ==
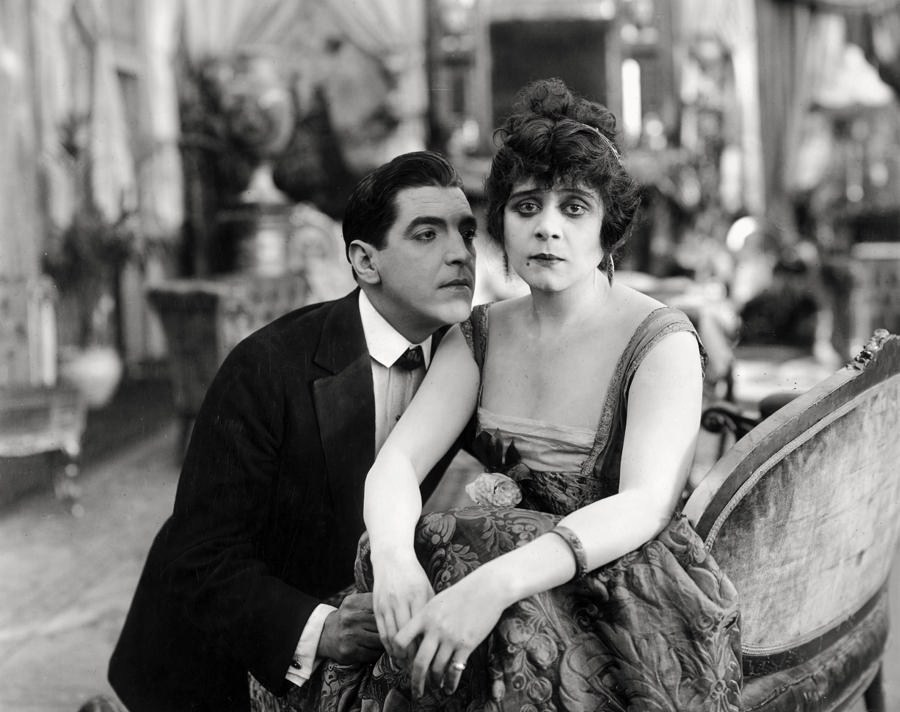
From Camille (1917), Alan Roscoe and Theda Bara

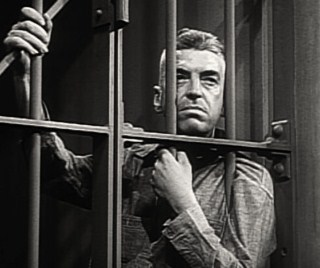
Roscoe in The Last Mile (1932)

- Graustark (1915)
- Camille (1917)
- Cleopatra (1917)
- The Shuttle (1918)
- A Soul for Sale (1918)
- The Doctor and the Woman (1918)
- Under the Yoke (1918)
- Salomé (1918)
- When a Woman Sins (1918)
- The She Devil (1918)
- The Siren's Song (1919)
- The City of Comrades (1919)
- Her Purchase Price (1919)
- Evangeline (1919)
- In Wrong (1919)
- The Branding Iron (1920)
- Her Elephant Man (1920)
- Molly and I (1920)
- The Hell Ship (1920)
- Her Unwilling Husband (1920)
- Madame X (1920)
- The Last of the Mohicans (1920)
- The Last Card (1921)
- Over the Wire (1921)
- No Trespassing (1922)
- The Man Who Saw Tomorrow (1922)
- Java Head (1923)
- The Spoilers (1923)
- A Wife's Romance (1923)
- One Glorious Night (1924)
- The Mirage (1924)
- The Chorus Lady (1924)
- The Girl of Gold (1925)
- The Lure of the Wild (1925)
- Before Midnight (1925)
- The Texas Streak (1926)
- The Wolf Hunters (1926)
- Tentacles of the North (1926)
- Long Pants (1927)
- Duty's Reward (1927)
- The Mating Call (1928)
- The Sawdust Paradise (1928)
- Driftwood (1928)
- Modern Mothers (1928)
- His Last Haul (1928)
- The Red Sword (1929)
- Flight (1929)
- Hurricane (1929)
- Call of the West (1930)
- The Fall Guy (1930)
- Danger Lights (1930)
- Half Shot at Sunrise (1930)
- High Stakes (1931)
- Hell Divers (1931) as Captain, U.S.S. Saratoga
- The Sin Ship (1931)
- The Public Defender (1931)
- Subway Express (1931)
- The Last Man (1932)
- Breach of Promise (1932)
- Hell Fire Austin (1932)
- A Strange Adventure (1932)
- The Last Mile (1932)
- Lucky Devils (1933)
