= The Siren's Song (1919 film) =

1919 film by J. Gordon Edwards

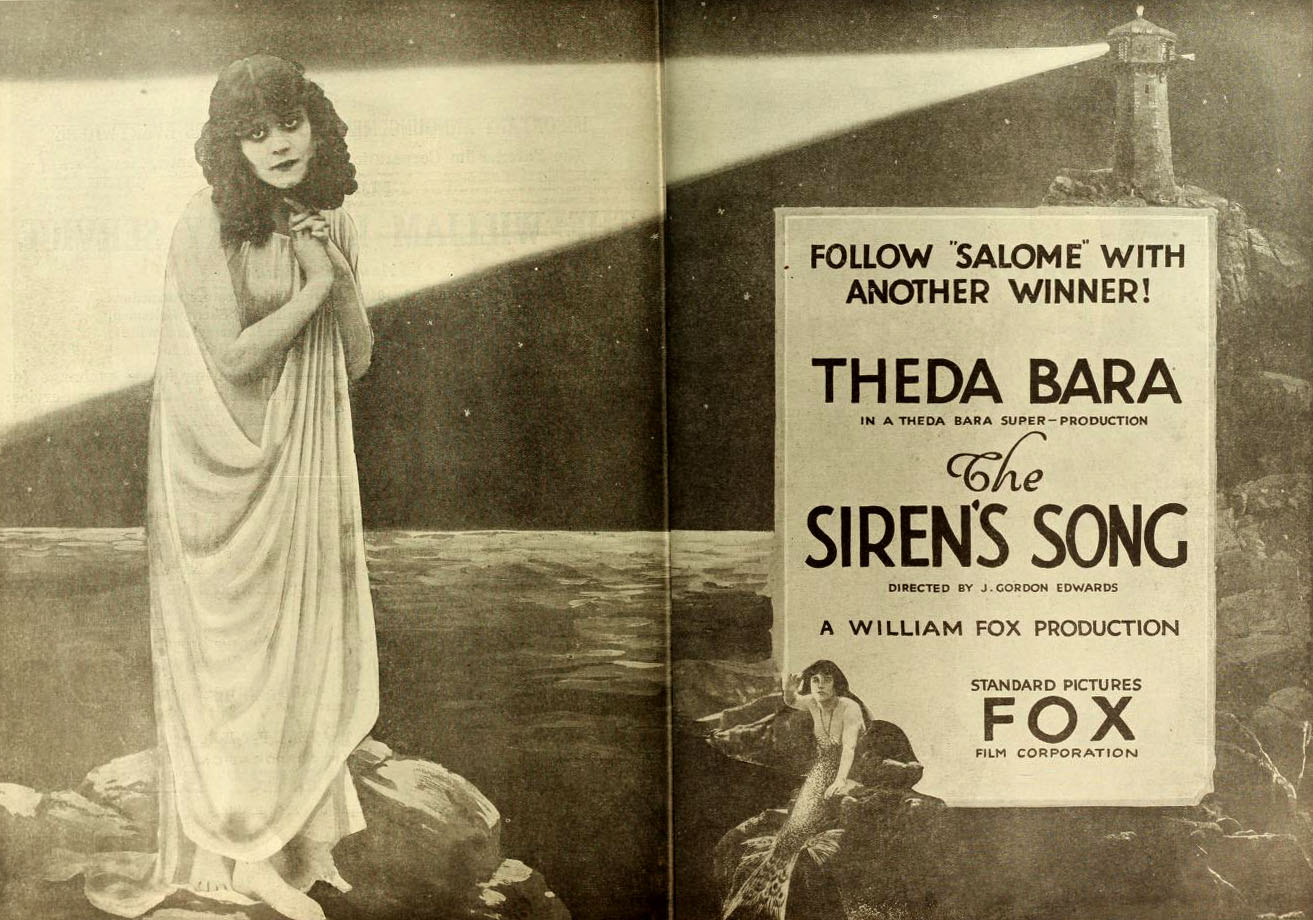
- ad for film
- Directed by: J. Gordon Edwards
- Written by: Charles Kenyon (scenario)
- Starring: Theda Bara; Alan Roscoe
- Cinematography: John W. Boyle
- Distributed by: Fox Film Corporation
- Release date: May 4, 1919
- Running time: (50 minutes) 5 reels
- Country: United States
- Languages: Silent; English intertitles

The Siren's Song is a 1919 American silent drama film directed by J. Gordon Edwards and starring Theda Bara. It is not known whether the film currently survives, and it may be a lost film.

== Plot ==
As described in a film magazine review, Marie Bernais, a Breton village girl, possesses a wonderful voice which her father believes is a gift from the devil. Raoul Nieppe loves her, but fears marrying below his station, and his rejection results in a suicide attempt by Marie. She is rescued by Hector Remey who was once a tenor but is now a Punch and Judy showman. Because of his assistance, she becomes a famous singer. When Raoul finds her, she is the mistress of Gaspard Prevost, a rich merchant who has a wife. Raoul persuades Marie to end the liaison, but she discovers that his anxiety was due to a desire to possess her. Distraught, she persists in singing for soldiers even though she is warned that this would damage her voice. She once again becomes a humble peasant girl. Gaspard, now free due to the death of his wife, seeks her out, and she finds happiness in an honorable marriage.

== Cast ==
- Theda Bara - Marie Bernais
- Al Fremont - Jules Bernais
- Ruth Handforth - Aunt Caroline
- Alan Roscoe - Gaspard Prevost
- Lee Shumway - Raoul Nieppe
- Carrie Clark Ward - Paulette Remey
- Paul Weigel - Hector Remey

== Influences ==
The film was referenced in a 1919 song of the same name by Roy Turk and Ray Perkins which mentions Bara by name.

== See also ==
- 1937 Fox vault fire
