= When Men Desire =

1919 film by J. Gordon Edwards

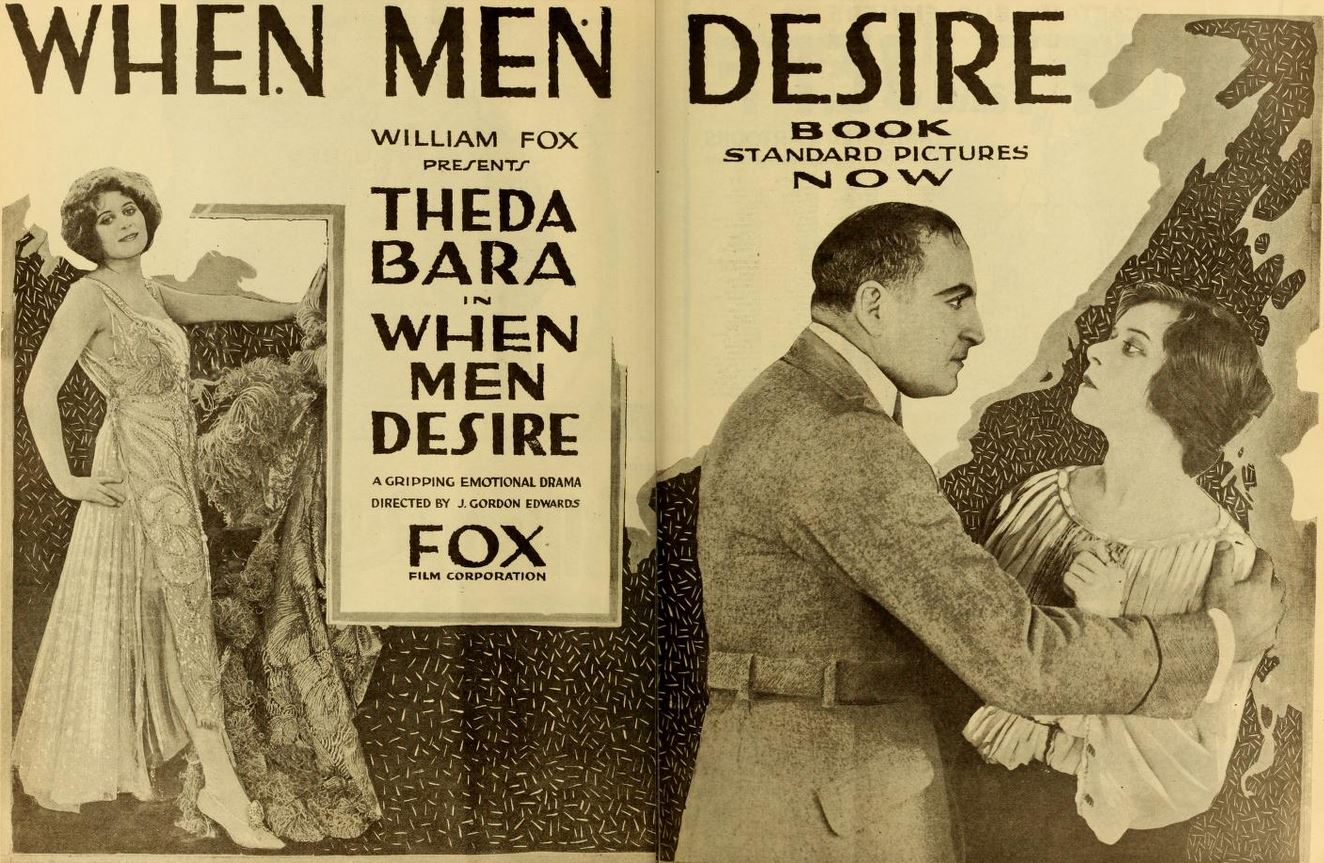
- Ad for film
- Directed by: J. Gordon Edwards
- Written by: J. Searle Dawley (story), Adrian Johnson (scenario)
- Starring: Theda Bara
- Cinematography: John W. Boyle
- Distributed by: Fox Film Corporation
- Release date: March 9, 1919
- Running time: 5 reels (50-60 minutes)
- Country: United States
- Language: Silent (English intertitles)

When Men Desire is a lost 1919 American silent drama film directed by J. Gordon Edwards and starring Theda Bara.

== Plot ==
As described in a film magazine review, after the United States declares war on Germany in 1917, American citizens within Germany like Marie Lohr (Bara), who was visiting her uncle Professor Lohr (Elkas) in Strassburg, hastily attempt to obtain passports and leave the county. However, Major von Rohn (Nye), a powerful officer in the German Army, desires her as a companion, noting that German officers in war time are permitted to have any woman that they fancy. Marie's American aviator sweetheart, Robert Stedman (Ward), has reached Switzerland, and Marie attempts to keep Von Rohn at a respectful distance. She escapes one hazardous situation when Stedman, during a mission, happens to drop a bomb on a house and apparently kills the German officer. Marie is then able to take, from a female German spy who was also in the house and crushed under the wreckage, passports and secret documents that instruct that the spy be taken through the French lines. Impersonating the spy, Marie is able to get to the German border, where she is detained by German soldiers who look to her to relieve their loneliness. Her companion from her journey is able to reach Robert, who then jumps into an airplane to rescue Marie. Marie holds off the soldiers and her identity is safe until von Rohn, recovered from his injuries, shows up at the woman's apartment where Marie is being held and where Robert is hidden in a closet. Marie stabs and kills Voh Rohn, and the two patriots escape after Robert dons the officer's uniform.

== Cast ==
- Theda Bara - Marie Lohr
- Fleming Ward - Robert Stedman
- G. Raymond Nye - von Rohn
- Edward Elkas - Professor Lohr
- Maude Hill - Lola Santez
- Florence Martin - Elsie Henner

== Production ==
At this point in her career, members of the public either wanted to see Bara or, because of a deep seated prejudice resulting from her prior roles portraying a vamp, refused to go to any of her films. To play into the patriotism of the American audience, the film includes prominent displays of the American flag and at one point has Bara bursting into song, singing "The Star-Spangled Banner." Bara disliked the low budget film, objecting to the film's plot given that war films were by 1919 unpopular with audiences and because she was scratched several times while filming a fight scene with Nye, who wore a German helmet topped with a large spiky iron cross.

== Reception ==
Although promoted as a "Theda Bara Super-Production," the film did poorly with audiences and the critics, and was not even reviewed in several newspapers and film magazines. The Kansas State Board of Review censored several intertitle cards it determined were too suggestive.

== Preservation ==
With no holdings located in archives, When Men Desire is considered a lost film.

== See also ==
- 1937 Fox vault fire
