= Beta Breuil =

American screenwriter

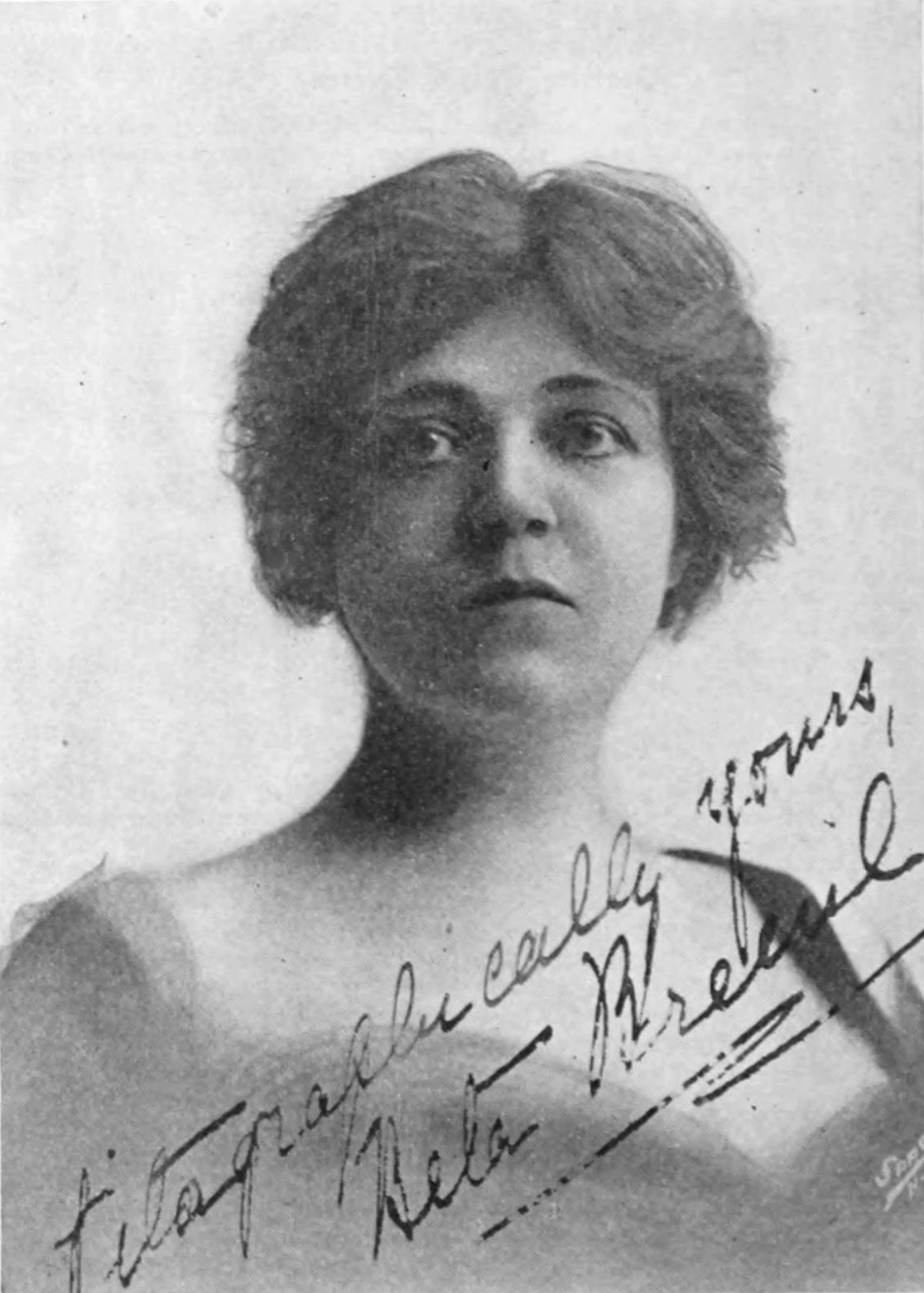
- Beta Breuil, photographed 1912. Signed, “Vitagraphically yours.”
- Born: Elizabeth Donner Vanderveer; 1876; New York City, U.S.
- Occupation: Screenwriter
- Years active: 1911–1918
- Spouse(s): Frank Milne Willard (m.1893, d.1904), Hartmann Breuil (m.1904, d.1908)

Beta Breuil (born 1876, death unknown) was the professional name and pen name of American screenwriter Elizabeth Donner Vanderveer. Breuil worked as a script editor and screenwriter for several motion picture companies in the early 1900s.

== Early life ==
Born in 1876 in New York City, Breuil was the daughter of Frank S. Vanderveer, a lawyer. Her family was well off and she attended schools in both New York City and Germany.

On November 21, 1893, Breuil married Frank Milne Willard, who owned a forge business and was fairly wealthy. The two were about to divorce but Williard died before they could, in 1904. This caused something of a scandal after his death. Breuil attempted to collect a life insurance policy, but was taken to court by his family. The story was written about in The New York Times under the headline "Death Prevented Divorce".

Breuil remarried in 1904 to Hartmann Breuil, whose last name she kept for her professional title. Four years after they married, Hartmann Breuil died at the age of 36. After the death of two husbands, Beta Breuil turned to the entertainment industry to make a living.

== Career ==
=== The Vitagraph Company of America ===
Breuil was over thirty when she started her professional career in the entertainment industry. She first attempted to find work as an actress in theater before she started work for the Vitagraph Company of America, a motion picture studio based in Brooklyn. According to a 1913 article in The New York Times, Breuil submitted scenarios to the Vitagraph Company and was subsequently hired as an assistant there in 1910. She worked her way up from assistant to head editor of the department in just four months.

Vitagraph was known for its exceptional scenario department and the efficiency with which the staff read and approved or discarded potential manuscripts. Breuil herself described the process as “weeding-out” the good manuscripts from the bad in an article she wrote for Moving Picture World, a film industry magazine, “All scripts are considered the day they arrive (arranging in numbers from seventy-five to one hundred a day), receiving sound judgment from two well trained readers. Those that are deemed worthwhile are submitted to the editor.” A New York Times article confirms that Vitagraph received up to 500 manuscripts a week, which all went to the department headed by Breuil. Some credited the productivity of this department to Breuil herself, by describing her as “the woman who organized and brought to a point of great efficiency the scenario department of the Vitagraph Company of America.”

=== After Vitagraph ===
After Breuil quit the Vitagraph Company, she worked as a freelance worker, writing scenarios “to order.” In 1914, she took the position of “artistic advisor” to the North American Film Corporation. Epes Winthrop Sargent described this position in Moving Picture World by writing, “Her undeniable talent is not limited to any particular line.... Here her genius for devising effects and working out ideas will have an absolutely unlimited scope, for she will have no one between herself and the company”.

Between 1915 and 1916, Breuil worked on (and also may have directed, though this remains unclear) four films with the Eastern Film Company, titled Daisies, Wisteria, Violets, and My Lady of the Lilacs. In 1916, she was also hired by the Mirror Films, Inc. to do “special work” on some of their films.

Though she worked at these three companies for some years, few films exist that give her title credit, so it is unclear exactly how many projects she worked on. She was, however, listed as a screenwriter on three different films in 1918: When a Woman Sins, A Daughter of France, and Life or Honor?

== Reputation ==
Breuil was well known and respected in the industry. One industry member wrote of Breuil's short retirement in Moving Picture World, “[Breuil] has worked constantly for the last three years without cessation and is entitled to a little ‘loafing time’ before she again gets into the traces.... but we are going to miss Mrs. Breuil”

In response to criticism of female scriptwriters, a 1913 article listed Breuil alongside Maibelle Heikes Justice, Hetty Gray Baker, and Gene Gauntier as an example of an excellent scriptwriter. The author cites Breuil as having completed “a couple hundred stories for Vitagraph” and as “doing splendidly as a free lance.”

On the topic of her own work, The New York Times wrote, “[Breuil] is proud of the fact that she has never failed to produce the sort of story asked for, and [she] regards her occupation as a sort of warfare waged against her imagination and her originality, in which she has thus far been triumphant.” Though her time in the industry was somewhat short, Breuil was considered one of the more prominent scriptwriters of her time, having been credited for writing, “some of the greatest Vitagraph stories.”

== Other notabilities ==
Besides her work as a scenario editor and screenwriter, Breuil was also credited for having helped start the careers of some important figures in the entertainment industry. One such person was Norma Talmadge, an actress who went on to star in a series of films written by Breuil called Belinda, the Slavey; Sleuthing; and A Lady and Her Maid. As the story goes, Talmage had a role in another film written by Breuil, In Neighboring Kingdoms, but the director was unimpressed with Talmage’s performance. Breuil, however, was “impressed by [Talmage’s] beauty” and convinced the co-founder of Vitagraph that the actress should be kept on. Breuil also had a hand in bringing in Laurence Trimble and Jean the Vitagraph Dog to the Vitagraph Company.

== Filmography ==
=== Screenwriter credits ===
- In Neighboring Kingdoms (1910)
- Mario’s Swan Song, or the Tragedy of the Little Musician (1910)
- Rose Leaves (1910)
- Auld Lang Syne (1910)
- The Battle Hymn of the Republic, or, in Washington D.C. 1861 (1911)
- The Misses Finch and Their Nephew Billy (1911)
- Her Choice (1912)
- Rock of Ages (1912)
- Bunny as a Reporter (1913)
- Buttercups (1913)
- Cutey and the Chorus Girls (1913)
- A Lady and Her Maid (1913)
- Love Hath Wrought a Miracle (1913)
- Playing With Fire (1913)
- Seeing Double (1913)
- Up and Down the Ladder (1913)
- Which? (1913)
- Daisies (1915)
- Wisteria (1915)
- Violets (1915)
- My Lady of the Lilacs (1916-1919)
- When a Woman Sins (1918)
