= Cleopatra (1917 film) =

1917 American film by J. Gordon Edwards

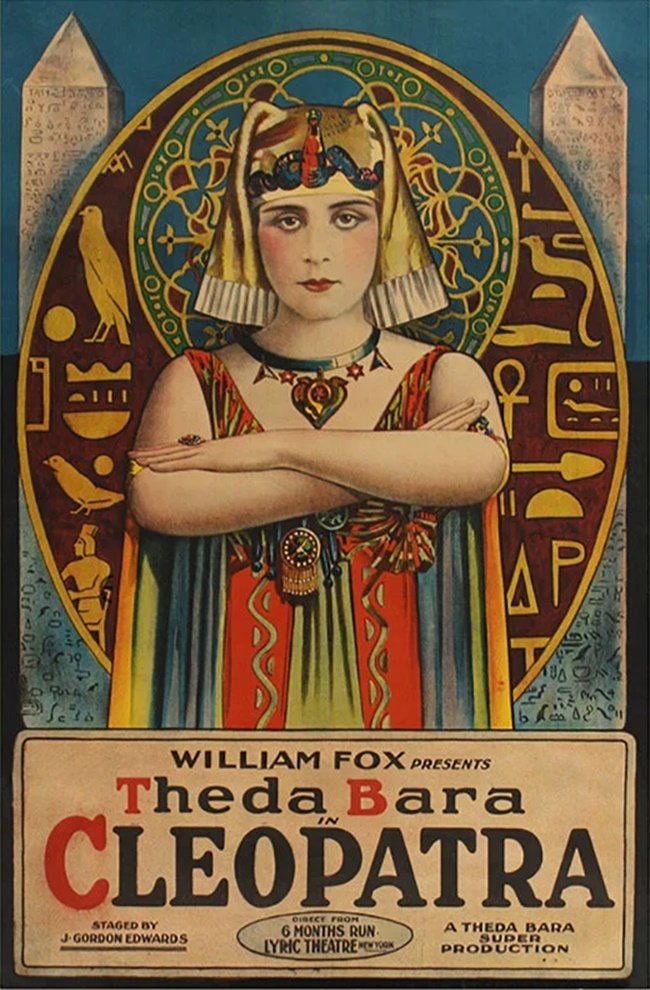
- Original release poster
- Directed by: J. Gordon Edwards
- Written by: William Shakespeare (1623 plays Antony and Cleopatra and Julius Caesar); Victorien Sardou; Émile Moreau (1890 play Cléopâtre)
- Screenplay by: Adrian Johnson
- Based on: Cleopatra; 1889 novel by H. Rider Haggard
- Produced by: William Fox
- Starring: Theda Bara; Fritz Leiber Sr. Thurston Hall
- Cinematography: John W. Boyle; Rial Schellinger; George Schneiderman
- Edited by: Edward M. McDermott
- Music by: José Martínez
- Distributed by: Fox Film Corporation
- Release date: October 14, 1917
- Running time: 125 mins. (11 reels)
- Country: United States
- Languages: Silent; English intertitles
- Budget: $250,000–500,000
- Box office: $1 million

Cleopatra is a 1917 American silent historical drama film based on H. Rider Haggard's 1889 novel Cleopatra, the 1890 play Cleopatre by Émile Moreau and Victorien Sardou, and the play Antony and Cleopatra by William Shakespeare. The film stars Theda Bara in the title role, Fritz Leiber Sr. as Julius Caesar, and Thurston Hall as Mark Antony.

The film is considered partially lost; only a minute of footage is known to survive.

== Plot ==
Because the film has been lost, the following summary is reconstructed from a description in a contemporary film magazine.

Cleopatra, the Siren of Egypt, by a clever ruse reaches Caesar and he falls victim to her charms. They plan to rule the world together, but then Caesar falls. Cleopatra's life is desired by the church, as the wanton woman's rule has become intolerable. Pharon, a high priest, is given a sacred dagger to take her life. He gives her his love instead and, when she is in need of some money, leads her to the tomb of his ancestors, where she tears the treasure from the breast of the mummy. With this wealth she goes to Rome to meet Antony. He leaves the affairs of state and travels to Alexandria with her, where they revel. Antony is recalled to Rome and married to Octavia, but his soul cries out for Cleopatra. He sends her a message to arm her ships and meet him at Actium, where they battle the opposing forces. They are overpowered, and flee to Alexandria. There they are captured by Octavius, and Antony dies in Cleopatra's arms. Before Cleopatra is to be dragged behind the wheels of Octavius' chariot, Pharon the priest, who has never ceased to love her, brings her the serpent that she joyously brings to her breast, dying royally with her crown on her head and scepter in her hand as becomes Egypt.

== Cast ==
- Theda Bara as Cleopatra
- Fritz Leiber as Caesar
- Thurston Hall as Antony
- Albert Roscoe as Pharon
- Herschel Mayall as Ventidius
- Dorothy Drake as Charmian
- Delle Duncan as Iras
- Henri De Vries as Octavius Caesar
- Art Acord as Kephren
- Hector V. Sarno as Messenger
- Genevieve Blinn as Octavia
- Edith Emmons as Dancer (uncredited)

== Production ==
Theda Bara during the production of the film

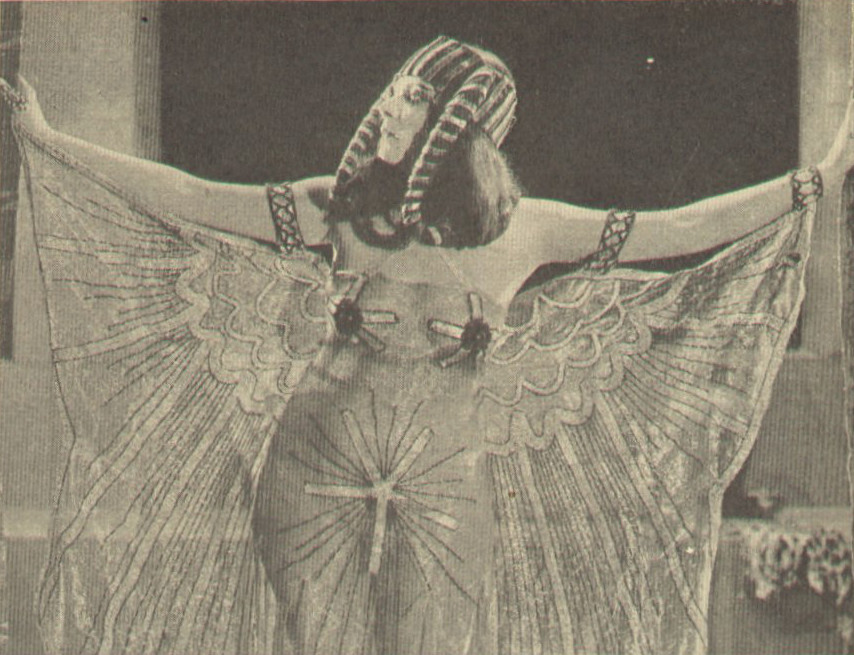
Theda Bara as Cleopatra

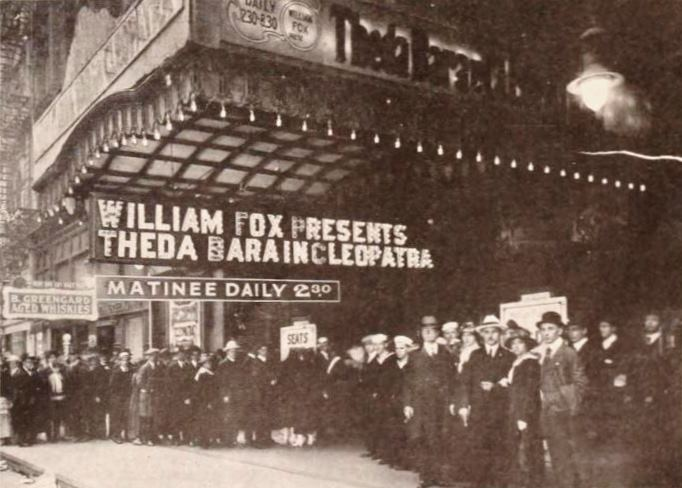
Contemporary movie theater showing the film in Chicago

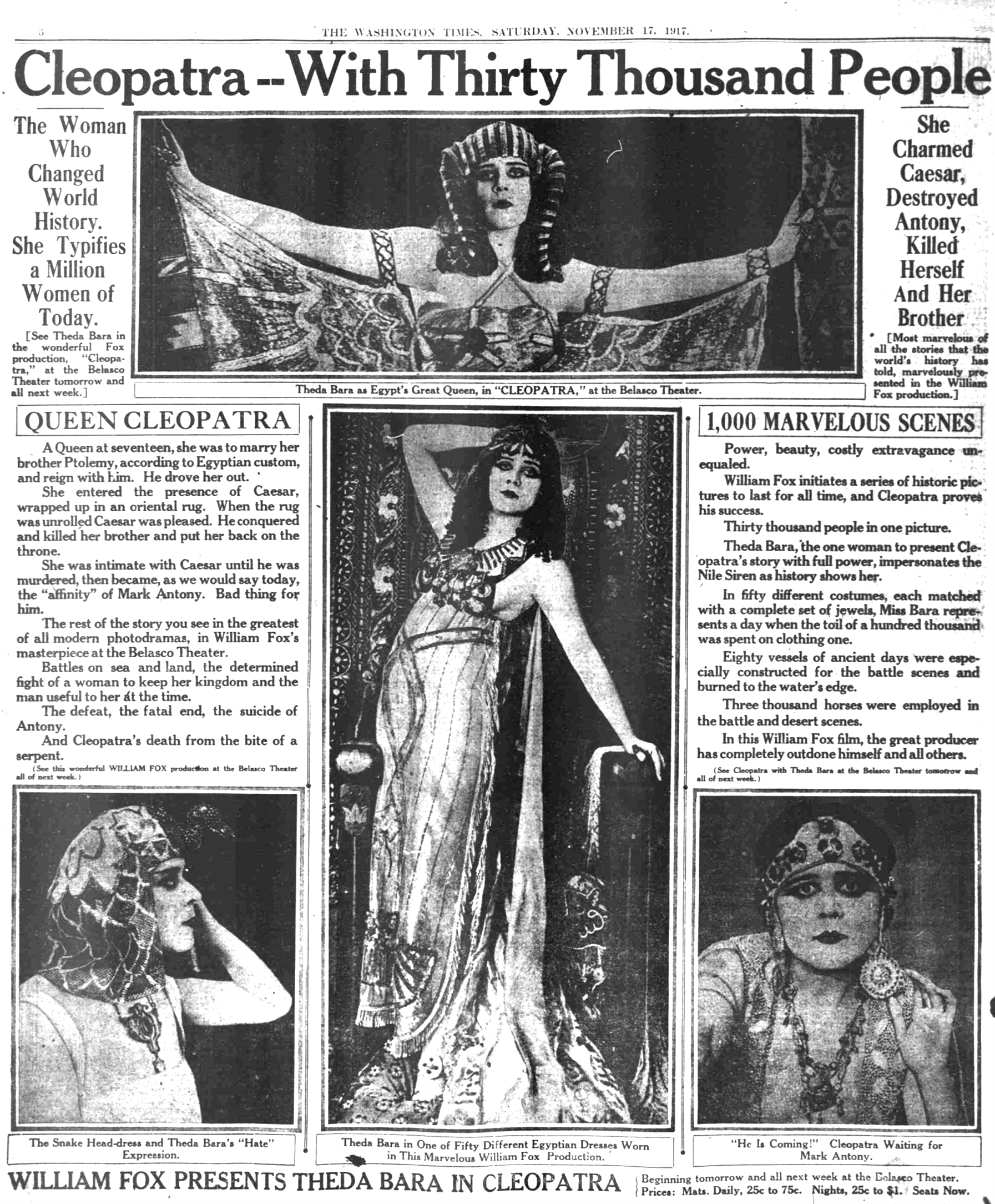
Article on Cleopatra from The Washington Times, 1917

Cleopatra cost $250,000–500,000 (equivalent to $12,564,935 in 2025) to produce. Copies of the Great Pyramid of Giza and Great Sphinx of Giza were constructed in Ventura County, California; a set of Alexandria's waterfront was constructed near Los Angeles; and a fleet for sea battle scenes was at the Balboa Peninsula. The film had 15,000 extras and over 2,000 horses.

Bara visited the Metropolitan Museum of Art and was shown the Egyptology section by Albert Lythgoe. Bara's car almost fell off a 1,000-foot cliff after an accident with a motorcyclist during production.

The picture was filmed on the Dominquez slough just outside Long Beach, California. The throne prop used in the film ended up, years later, in the possession of Leon Schlesinger Productions; its disposition after the acquisition of that company by Warner Bros. is unknown.

== Reception ==
The film premiered at the Lyric Theatre in New York City on October 14, 1917. Around 5 million people were reported to have watched the film within a year of its release.

Like many American films of the time, Cleopatra was subject to cuts by city and state film censorship boards. For example, the Chicago Board of Censors required the following cuts:

in Reel 1, three scenes of the Queen posing before Caesar with her navel exposed, ascending stairs to throne and suggestively leaning against him, two scenes of Queen lying on couch with Caesar standing near, Reel 2, Queen in objectionable costume turning as she embraces Caesar, first and last scenes of Queen at astrologer's table looking into crystal, Reel 3, first scene of Queen at harp and on couch before she goes to dais, two closeups of Queen on dais bending over, two full length views of Queen in chariot exposing her legs, two views of Queen on couch awakening from sleep, Reel 4, entire incident of Queen's meeting with Pharon except scene at beginning of conversation at point where she raises cloth as she starts towards balcony to where she leaves Pharon, all front views of Queen showing her breasts outlined by snake breast plates, closeup of Queen in spangle costume at doorway as she descends stairs and approaches Pharon, closeup kissing scene between Queen and Pharon and Queen's actions following, scene of Queen and Pharon before couch where she turns and exposes legs, three scenes of Queen in objectionable costume before and after Pharon raises knife, two closeups of stabbing guard, all scenes of Queen coming down stairs, two scenes of Queen on low couch, two scenes before and two scenes after taking parchment from Pharon, Queen on couch taking Pharon's hand and scene following embrace, Queen standing while Pharon reads parchment, Queen advancing towards Pharon, closeup of Queen seizing knife and all views of it descending, Reel 6, five closest views of Antony and Queen showing her breasts, Reel 7, Queen standing before Antony, Queen on couch after Antony leaves, three scenes of Queen in leopard skin costume with one breast exposed, full view of Queen in leopard skin costume on couch, Reel 8, the intertitle "Antony, one last word. Will nothing save you from this wanton?" etc., four scenes of Queen and Antony on couch before curtains are drawn aside, Reel 10, Queen walking to throne in costume exposing body.

After the Hays Code was implemented in Hollywood, Cleopatra was judged to be too obscene to be shown. However, despite its controversies, the film was a huge box office draw, becoming one of the most successful blockbusters of 1917.

== Preservation status ==
20 second fragment of Cleopatra

The last two prints known to exist were destroyed in fires at the Fox studios in 1937 (along with the majority of Bara's other films for Fox) and at the Museum of Modern Art in New York City in 1958, and the majority of the film is now considered lost.

Filmmaker and film historian Phillip Dye reconstructed Cleopatra on video, titled Lost Cleopatra, editing together still picture montages combined with the surviving film clip. The script is based on the original scenario with modifications based on research into censorship reports, reviews of the film and synopses from period magazines. Dye screened the film at the Hollywood Heritage Museum on February 8, 2017. The full reconstruction has not been officially released publicly.

40 second fragment of Cleopatra

For a long time, only a 20 second fragment was believed to survive until August 22, 2023, when an additional 40-second fragment was found packaged with a 1920s-era toy film projector on eBay, and then uploaded to YouTube.

== See also ==
- List of cultural depictions of Cleopatra
- Pre-Code sex films
- List of American films of 1917
- Cleopatra
- List of incomplete or partially lost films
- 1937 Fox vault fire

== Works cited ==
- Zierold, Norman (1973). Sex Goddesses of the Silent Screen. Regnery Publishing.
- "Questions and Answers". Photoplay. Vol. XIII, no. 5. Macfadden Communications Group. 1918.
