= Under the Yoke (film) =

1918 film directed by J. Gordon Edwards

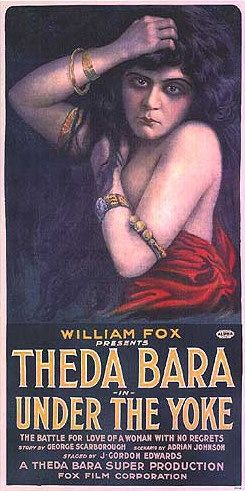
- Film poster
- Directed by: J. Gordon Edwards
- Written by: Adrian Johnson
- Based on: "Maria of the Roses" by George Scarborough
- Produced by: William Fox
- Starring: Theda Bara; G. Raymond Nye
- Cinematography: John W. Boyle
- Distributed by: Fox Film Corporation
- Release date: June 9, 1918
- Running time: 5 reels
- Country: United States
- Language: Silent (English intertitles)

Under the Yoke is a 1918 American silent drama film directed by J. Gordon Edwards and starring Theda Bara. It is based on the short story "Maria of the Roses" by George Scarborough. Under the Yoke is now considered to be a lost film.

== Plot ==
As described in a film magazine, when Maria Valverda (Bara) refuses the attentions of Diablo Ramirez (Nye), he starts an insurrection among the native Filipinos. Maria's father Don Ramon is killed and Maria is held hostage. She gets word to Capt. Paul Winter (Roscoe) of the American troops in Manila and he comes to her assistance, but his troops are outnumbered and they are made prisoners by the revolting revolutionists. Maria and Paul attempt to escape, but they are caught and brought back. At the Manila headquarters, trouble is suspected and reinforcements are sent. Before long, the revolt is subdued and peace reigns over Maria's home, and happiness over the betrothal of Maria and Paul.

== Historical background ==
As noted by researcher Nathan Bradford, "At the time when 'Under The Yoke' was made, American policy towards the Philippines consisted of a promise to grant independence at some unspecified future time, when Filipinos would be 'ready', grants of a limited amount of autonomy, and a firm resolve to maintain US rule 'for the time being'. Well within living memory - in fact, just sixteen years before the film was made - the US used considerable force to put down those Filipinos impertinent enough to seek independence in the here and now. The film, made for the general American public, naturally reflects this narrative: beautiful Filipina damsel in distress threatened by the literally diabolic Filipino rebel; chivalrous American officer comes to the rescue; eventually, the revolt is crushed, American rule reinforced, Filipina and American officer get married, Happy End".

== Cast ==
- Theda Bara as Maria Valverda
- G. Raymond Nye as "Diablo" Ramirez
- Albert Roscoe as Captain Paul Winter
- Edwin B. Tilton as Don Ramon Valverde
- Carrie Clark Ward as Duenna

== Reception ==
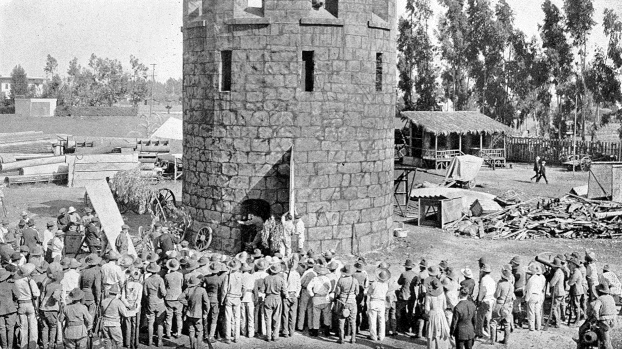
Filming a scene with Theda Bara

Like many American films of the time, Under the Yoke was subject to restrictions and cuts by city and state film censorship boards. For example, the Chicago Board of Censors cut, in Reel 3, the execution of Don Ramon, Reel 4, scene between Maria and Diablo where he kisses her on the shoulder, and required three scenes of torturing an American soldier be shortened.

== See also ==
- List of lost films
- 1937 Fox vault fire
