= When a Woman Sins =

1918 film directed by J. Gordon Edwards

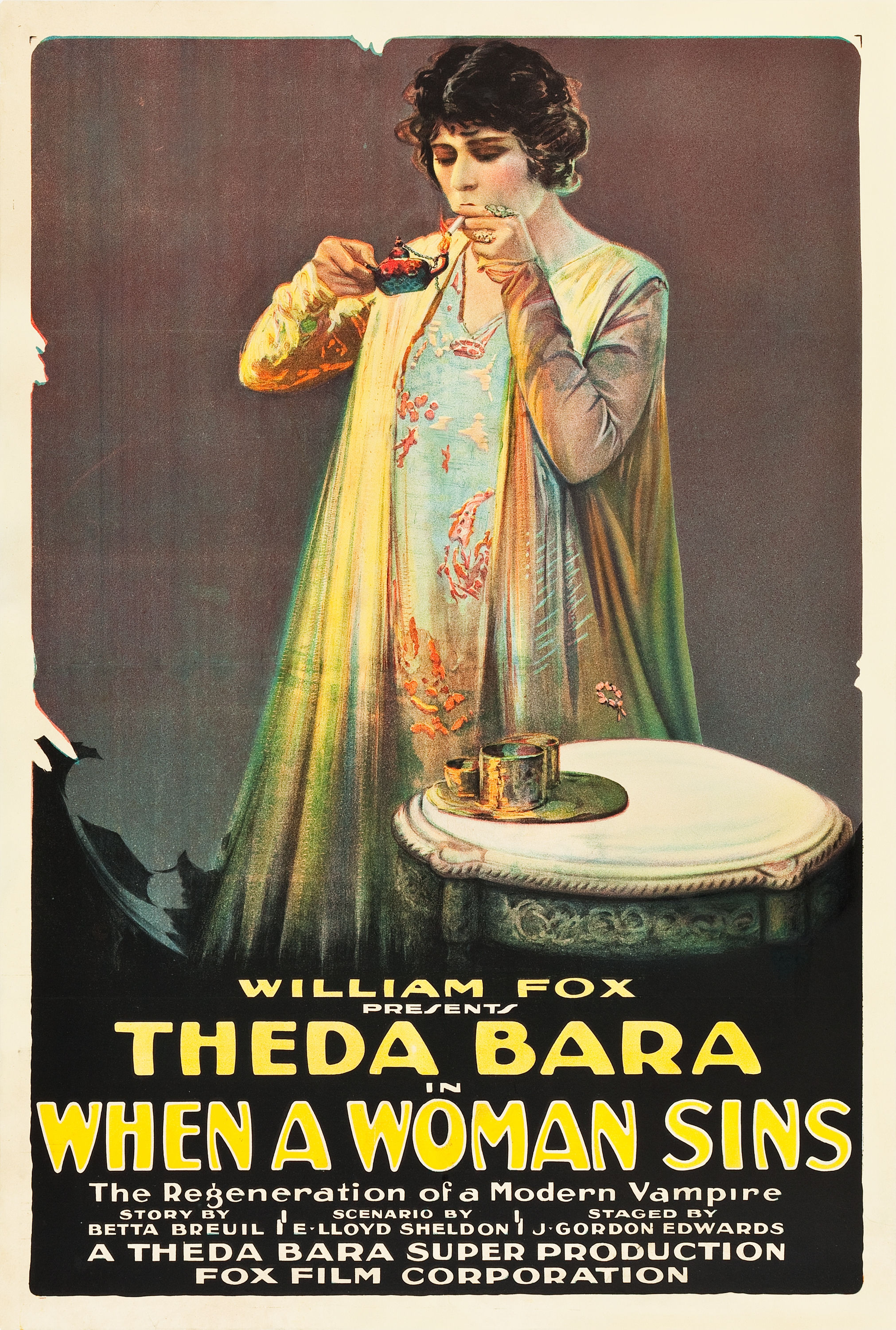
- Film poster (1918)
- Directed by: J. Gordon Edwards
- Written by: E. Lloyd Sheldon
- Story by: Beta Breuil
- Produced by: William Fox
- Starring: Theda Bara; Josef Swickard
- Cinematography: John W. Boyle
- Distributed by: Fox Film Corporation
- Release date: September 20, 1918
- Running time: 60 minutes (7 reels)
- Country: United States
- Language: Silent (English intertitles)

When a Woman Sins is a 1918 American silent drama film directed by J. Gordon Edwards and starring Theda Bara.

== Plot ==
As described in a film magazine, nurse Lilian Marchard is engaged by Mortimer West, an old rogue who is dangerously ill. She meets his son Michael, a divinity student, and his earnestness ignites a spark of love within her. Michael professes his ardent love for her in the garden, and that night, coming upon her in Mortimer's bedroom, she misconstrues the situation and becomes angry. The old man dies and Dr. Stone orders her from the house.

The years pass and Lilian becomes Poppea, a notorious charmer and dancer of the town. Among her many lovers is Reggie West, Michael's cousin. Michael goes to Poppea to ask her to give Reggie up for his mother's sake, and Reggie, waiting without, shoots himself.

Poppea hosts a dinner for several wealthy men and just as she is about to auction herself off to the highest bidder, she receives a bible and lily from Michael. She gives up her fast friends and returns to the slums to minister to the sick, finally winning Michael's love.

== Cast ==
- Theda Bara as Lilian Marchard / Poppea
- Josef Swickard as Mortimer West
- Albert Roscoe as Michael West
- Alfred Fremont as Augustus Van Brooks
- Jack Rollens as Reggie West
- Genevieve Blinn as Mrs. West
- Ogden Crane as Dr. Stone

== Reception ==
Like many American films of the time, When a Woman Sins was subject to cuts by city and state film censorship boards. For example, the Chicago Board of Censors required cuts, in Reel 1, of pictures of a young woman in pajamas, Reel 2, old man kissing nurse on shoulder, Reel 5, the intertitle "I am for sale to the highest bidder", and to insert a new intertitle to the effect that the woman will marry the man who bids the most.

== Preservation status ==
When a Woman Sins was considered to be a lost film until February 27, 2019 when a fragment totaling 23 seconds was found.

== See also ==
- List of lost films
- 1937 Fox vault fire
