= Her Great Match =

1915 film by René Plaissetty

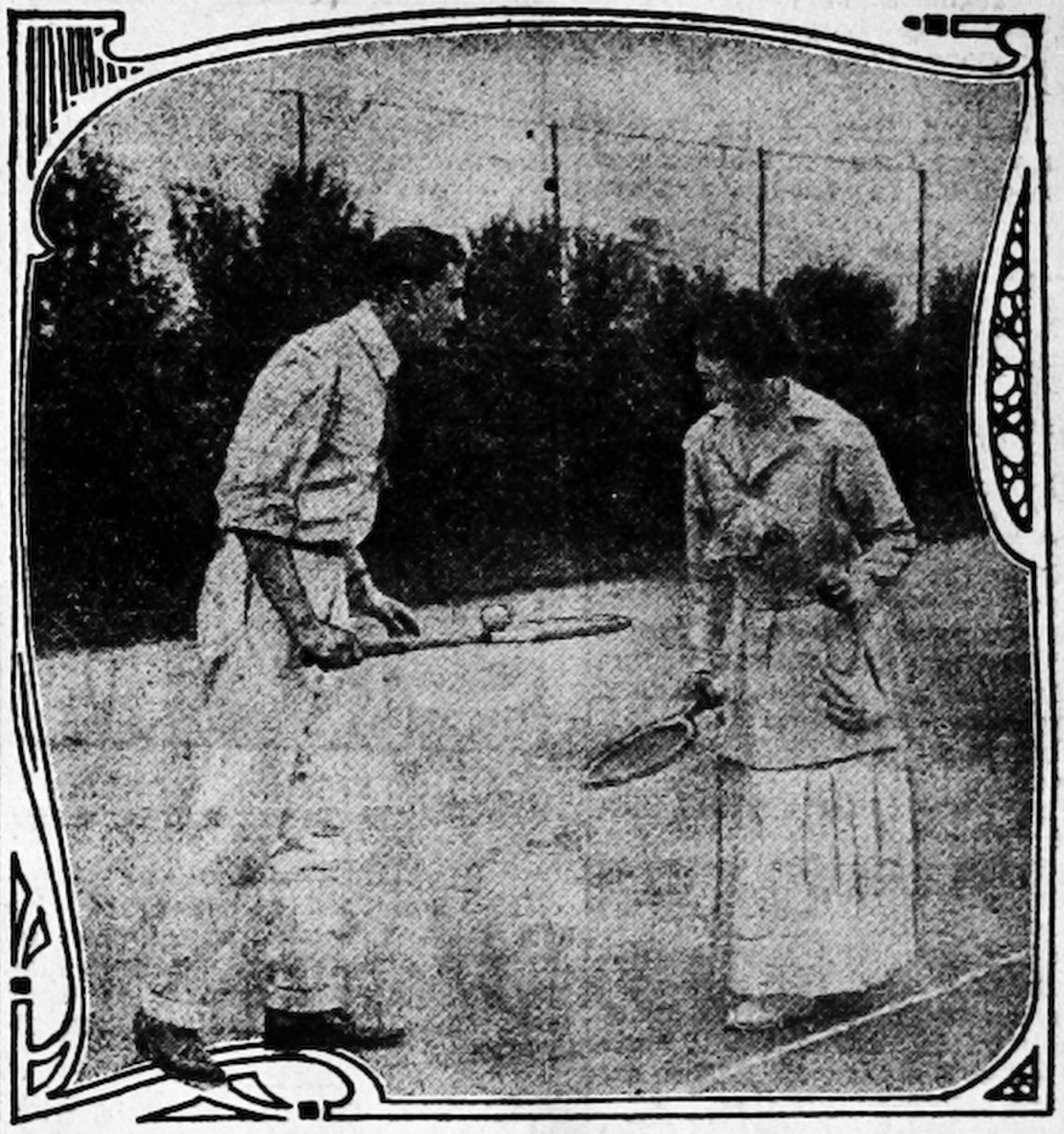
- Newspaper publicity photo
- Directed by: René Plaissetty
- Written by: Clyde Fitch(play)
- Starring: Gail Kane; Vernon Steele
- Cinematography: John W. Boyle
- Production companies: Popular Plays and Players
- Distributed by: Metro Pictures
- Release date: August 30, 1915
- Running time: 5 reels
- Country: United States
- Language: Silent(English intertitles)

Her Great Match is a silent 1915 drama film starring Gail Kane and based on the Broadway play by Clyde Fitch. In the 1905 play the star was stage beauty Maxine Elliott. This film was directed by Frenchman René Plaissetty and released through the Metro Pictures studios then just newly formed. This movie survives and is preserved at George Eastman House Motion Picture Collection.

== Cast ==
- Gail Kane - Jo Sheldon
- Vernon Steele - Prince Adolph (*as Vernon Steel)
- Ned Burton - Mr. Bote
- Clarissa Selwynne - Mrs. Sheldon
- Lawrence Grattan - Mr. Sheldon
- Julia Hurley - The Duchess Louise
