= Camille (1917 film) =

1917 film by J. Gordon Edwards

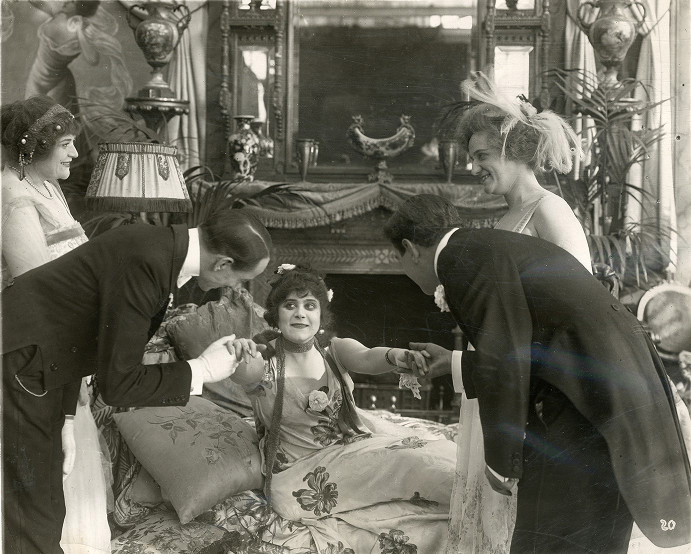
- Film still with Theda Bara
- Directed by: J. Gordon Edwards
- Written by: Adrian Johnson (scenario)
- Based on: La Dame aux Camélias; 1848 novel by Alexandre Dumas, fils
- Produced by: William Fox
- Starring: Theda Bara; Alan Roscoe; Walter Law; Glen White; Alice Gale; Claire Whitney; Richard Barthelmess
- Cinematography: Rial Schellinger
- Distributed by: Fox Film Corporation
- Release date: September 30, 1917
- Running time: 5 reels (60 minutes)
- Country: United States
- Languages: Silent; English intertitles

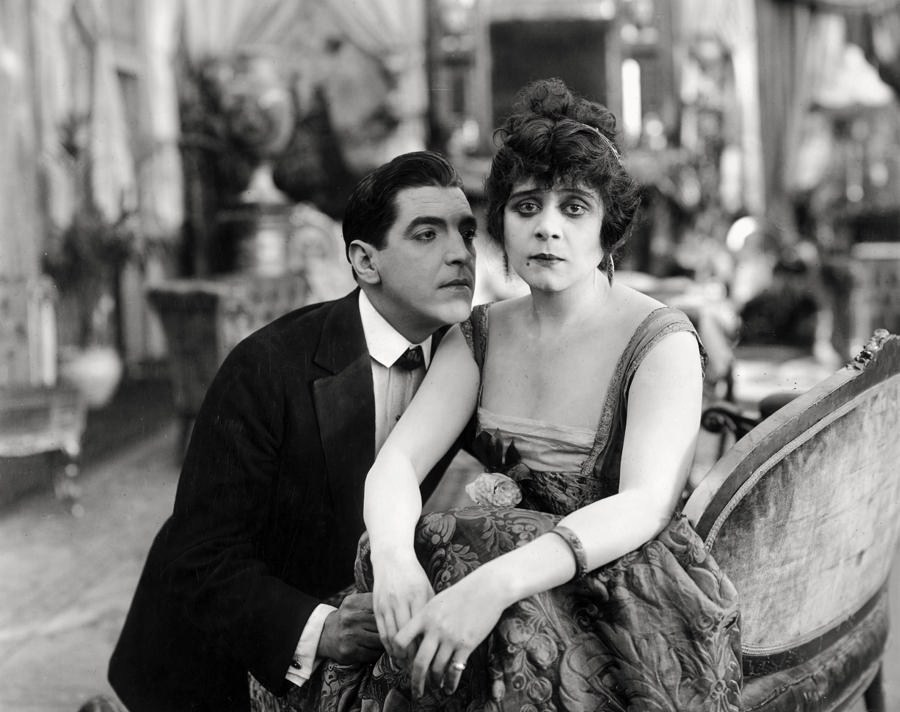
From Camille (1917), Alan Roscoe and Theda Bara

Camille is a 1917 American silent film based on the play adaptation of La Dame aux Camélias (The Lady of the Camellias) by Alexandre Dumas, fils, first published in French as a novel in 1848 and as a play in 1852. Adapted for the screen by Adrian Johnson, Camille was directed by J. Gordon Edwards and starred Theda Bara as Camille and Albert Roscoe as her lover, Armand.

The film was produced by Fox Film Corporation and shot at the Fox Studio in Fort Lee, New Jersey.

== Plot ==
As described in a film magazine, Armand Duval, a son in the proud but poor house of Duval, loves Camille, a notorious Parisian beauty. His love for Camille means that his sister Celeste cannot marry the man she loves, so the father goes to Camille and begs her to give Armand up, which she does. This arouses the anger of Armand, and he denounces her one evening in public. The Count de Varville challenges Armand to a duel, which he wins, wounding Armand in the arm. Believing Camille no longer loves him, Armand does not go to see her. One day, his father tells him that Camille is dying. He goes to her and, after a few words, she dies in the arms of her lover.

== Cast ==
- Theda Bara as Marguerite Gauthier / Camille
- Alan Roscoe as Armand Duval (credited as Albert Roscoe)
- Walter Law as Count de Varville
- Glen White as Gaston Rieux
- Alice Gale as Madame Prudence
- Claire Whitney as Celeste Duval
- Richard Barthelmess in a bit part

== Reception ==
Like many American films of the time, Camille was subject to cuts by city and state film censorship boards. The Chicago Board of Censors issued an Adult's Only permit, cut two long gambling sequences where money was on the table and flashed all other gambling scenes, and cut the two intertitles "That woman once favored me when I was poor, now that I am rich bear witness that I pay" and "You are here because you are selfish — and make a sale of your love to the highest bidder".

== Preservation status ==
This film is now considered a lost film. A reel was rumored to be found in a Russian archive but was mislabled and the film remains lost.

== See also ==
- List of lost films
- 1937 Fox vault fire
