= Theda Bara =

American actress (1885–1955)

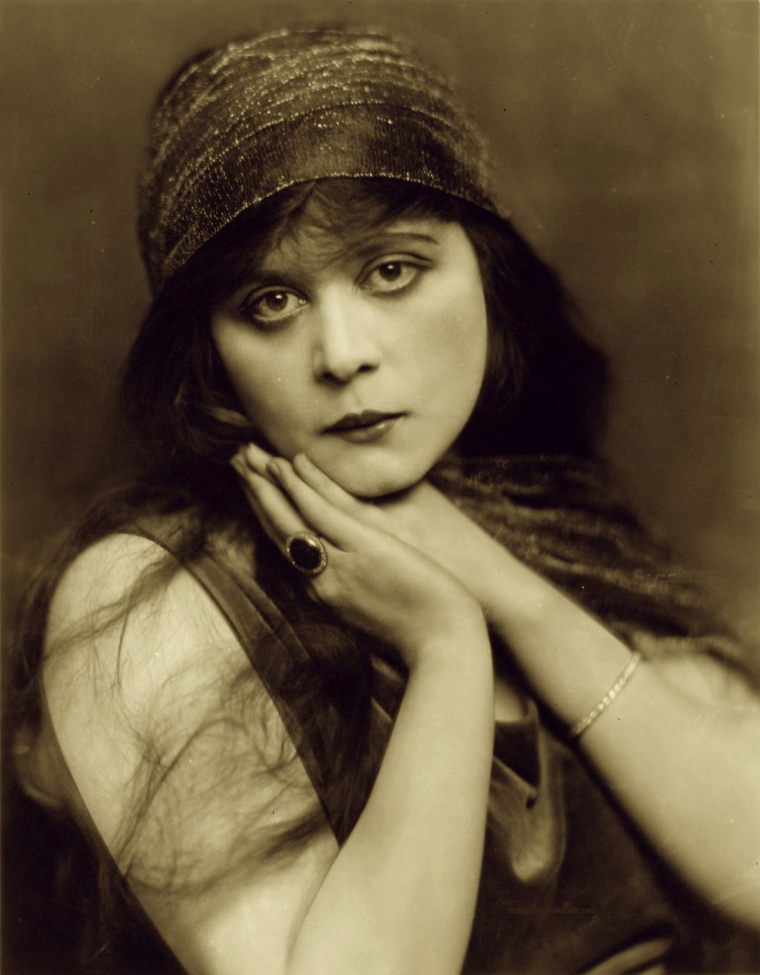
- Bara in 1921
- Born: Theodosia Burr Goodman; July 29, 1885; Cincinnati, Ohio, U.S.
- Died: April 7, 1955 (aged 69); Los Angeles, California, U.S.
- Resting place: Forest Lawn Memorial Park Cemetery
- Education: University of Cincinnati
- Occupation: Actress
- Years active: 1908–1926
- Spouse: Charles Brabin (m. 1921)
- Relatives: Lori Bara (sister)

Theda Bara (/ˈθiːdə ˈbærə/ THEE-də BARR-ə; born Theodosia Burr Goodman; July 29, 1885 – April 7, 1955) was an American silent film and stage actress. Bara was one of the more popular actresses of the silent era and one of cinema's early sex symbols. Her femme fatale roles earned her the nickname "the Vamp" (short for "vampire", here meaning a seductive woman), (Note: These roles did not portray the undead vampires featured in later horror films. The term "vampire" for a seductive woman was derived from "The Vampire", an 1897 poem by Rudyard Kipling, inspired by Philip Burne-Jones' 1896 painting "The Vampire" depicting a woman (purportedly Mrs Patrick Campbell, a stage actress and the artist's ex-lover) mounting an unconscious man.) later fueling the rising popularity in "vamp" roles based in exoticism and sexual domination.

Born to a Jewish family in Cincinnati, Bara was the biggest star of Fox Studios, which concocted a fictitious persona for her as an Egyptian-born woman interested in the occult. She made 43 films between 1914 and 1926. Three of her films were for Pathé, one was for Chadwick Pictures, and 39 were for Fox; most of these were lost in the 1937 Fox vault fire.

After leaving Fox in 1919, Bara was unable to recapture her previous success. Following a marriage to Charles Brabin in 1921, she made three more films before retiring from acting in 1926. Bara never appeared in any sound films.

== Early life ==
Bara was born Theodosia Burr Goodman on July 29, 1885, in Cincinnati, Ohio. She was named after Theodosia Burr Alston, the daughter of U.S. Vice President Aaron Burr. Her father was Bernard Goodman (1853–1936), a prosperous Jewish tailor from Poland. Her mother, Pauline Louise Françoise (née de Coppett; 1861–1957), was born in Switzerland. Bernard and Pauline married in 1882. Theda had two younger siblings: Marque (1888–1954) and Esther (1897–1965), who worked as an actress and writer as Lori Bara. (Note: Both of Bara's siblings joined her for a time in the movie business. Marque worked briefly as a director. After an unsuccessful attempt to establish an acting career, Lori became a screenwriter.)

In 1890, the family moved to Avondale, a Cincinnati suburb with a substantial Jewish community. Bara attended Walnut Hills High School, graduating in 1903. After attending the University of Cincinnati for two years, she worked mainly in local theater productions, but did explore other projects. After moving to New York City in 1908, she made her Broadway debut the same year in The Devil.

== Career ==
Most of Bara's early films were shot along the East Coast, where the film industry was then based, primarily at Fox Studios in Fort Lee, New Jersey. She lived with her family in New York City. The rise of Hollywood as the center of the American film industry forced her to move to Los Angeles to film the epic Cleopatra (1917), which became one of her biggest hits. Only a one-minute fragment of Cleopatra is known to exist today, but numerous photographs of her in costume as Cleopatra have survived.

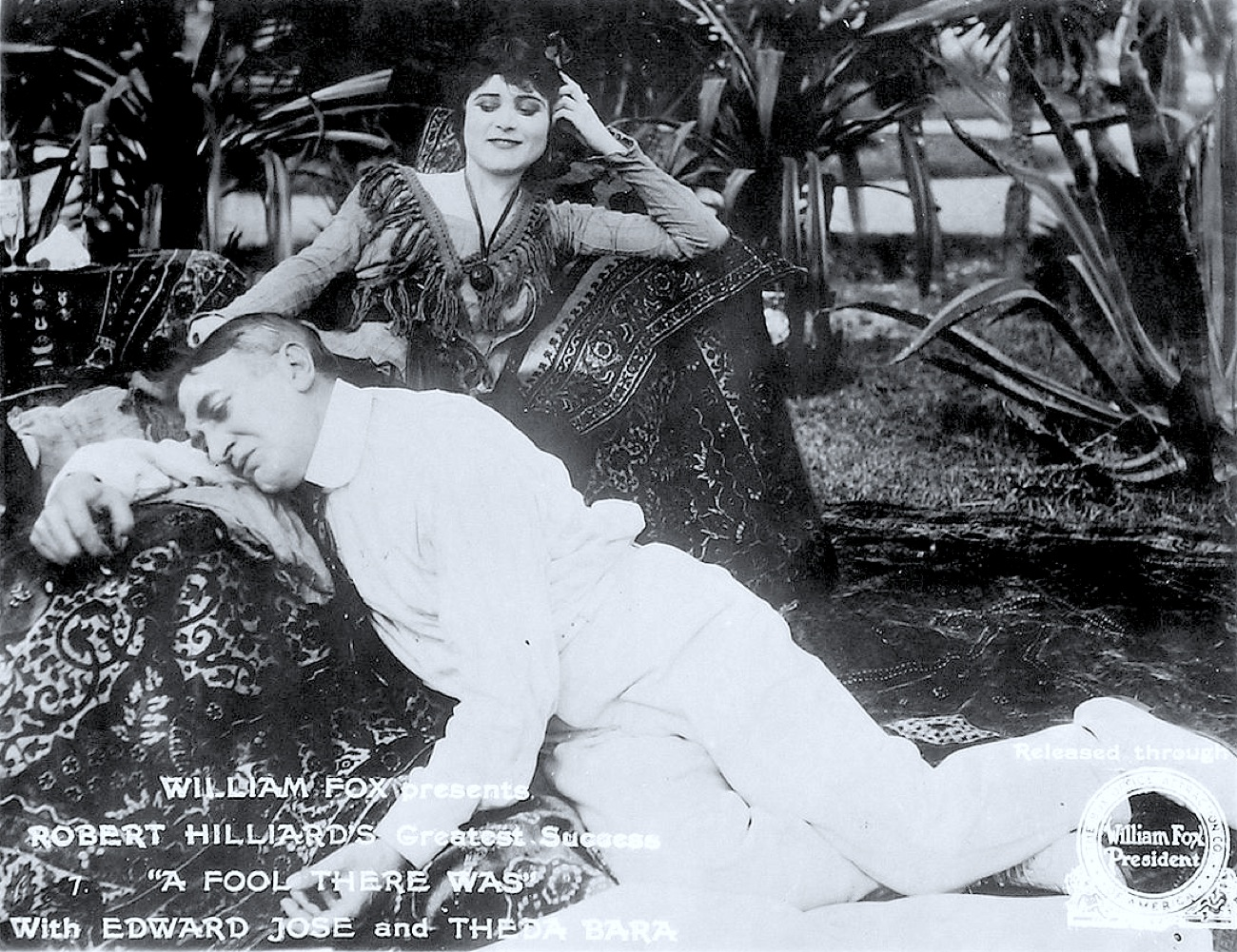
Bara in A Fool There Was (1915)

Bara was Fox's biggest star between 1915 and 1919, but she allowed her five-year contract with the company to expire upon tiring of being typecast. Her final Fox film was The Lure of Ambition (1919). In 1920, she turned briefly to the stage, appearing on Broadway in The Blue Flame. Her fame drew large crowds to the theater, but her acting was savaged by critics.

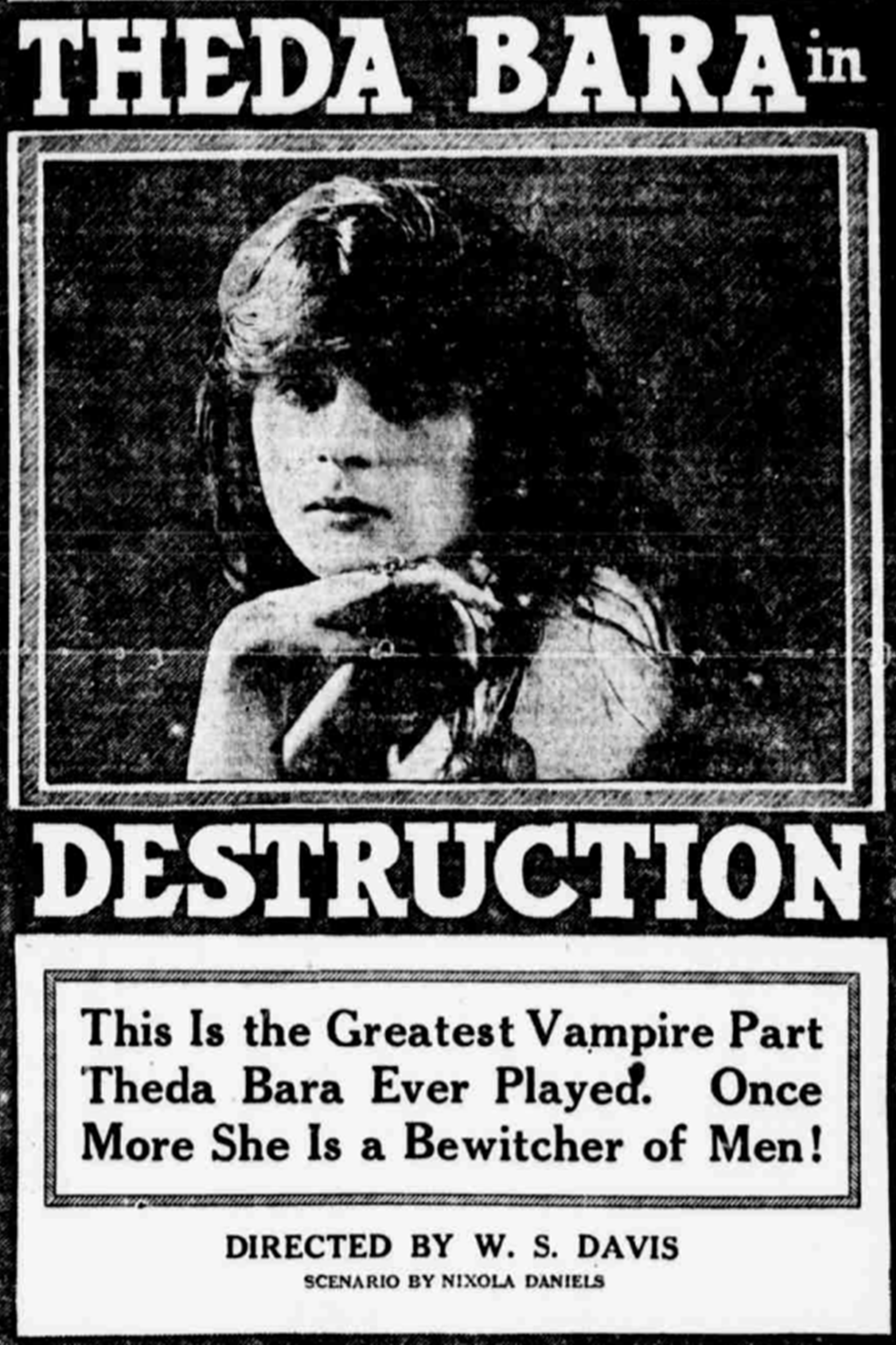
Advertisement for Destruction, December 24, 1915

Her career suffered after leaving Fox, and she did not make another film until The Unchastened Woman (1925) for Chadwick Pictures. She retired after making only two more films, the short comedies Madame Mystery (1926) and 45 Minutes from Hollywood (1926) directed by Stan Laurel for Hal Roach; in the latter, Bara parodied her "vamp" image.

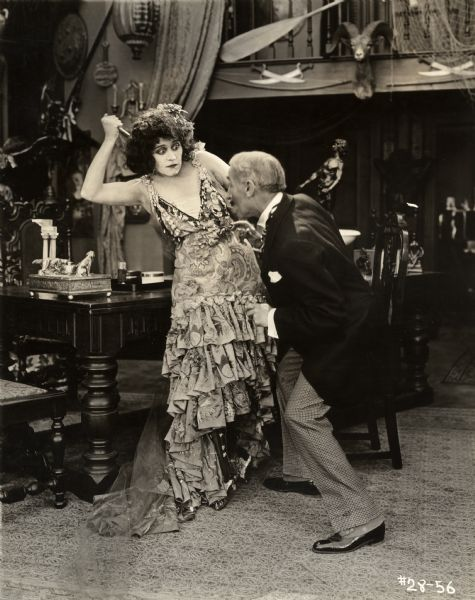
Bara in The She-Devil (1918)

At the height of her fame, Bara earned $4,000 per week (equivalent to $74,300 in 2025). Her better-known roles were as the "vamp", although she attempted to avoid typecasting by playing wholesome heroines in films such as Under Two Flags and Her Double Life. She appeared as Juliet in a version of Shakespeare's Romeo and Juliet. Although Bara took her craft seriously, she was too successful playing exotic, wanton women to develop a more versatile career.

=== Image and name ===
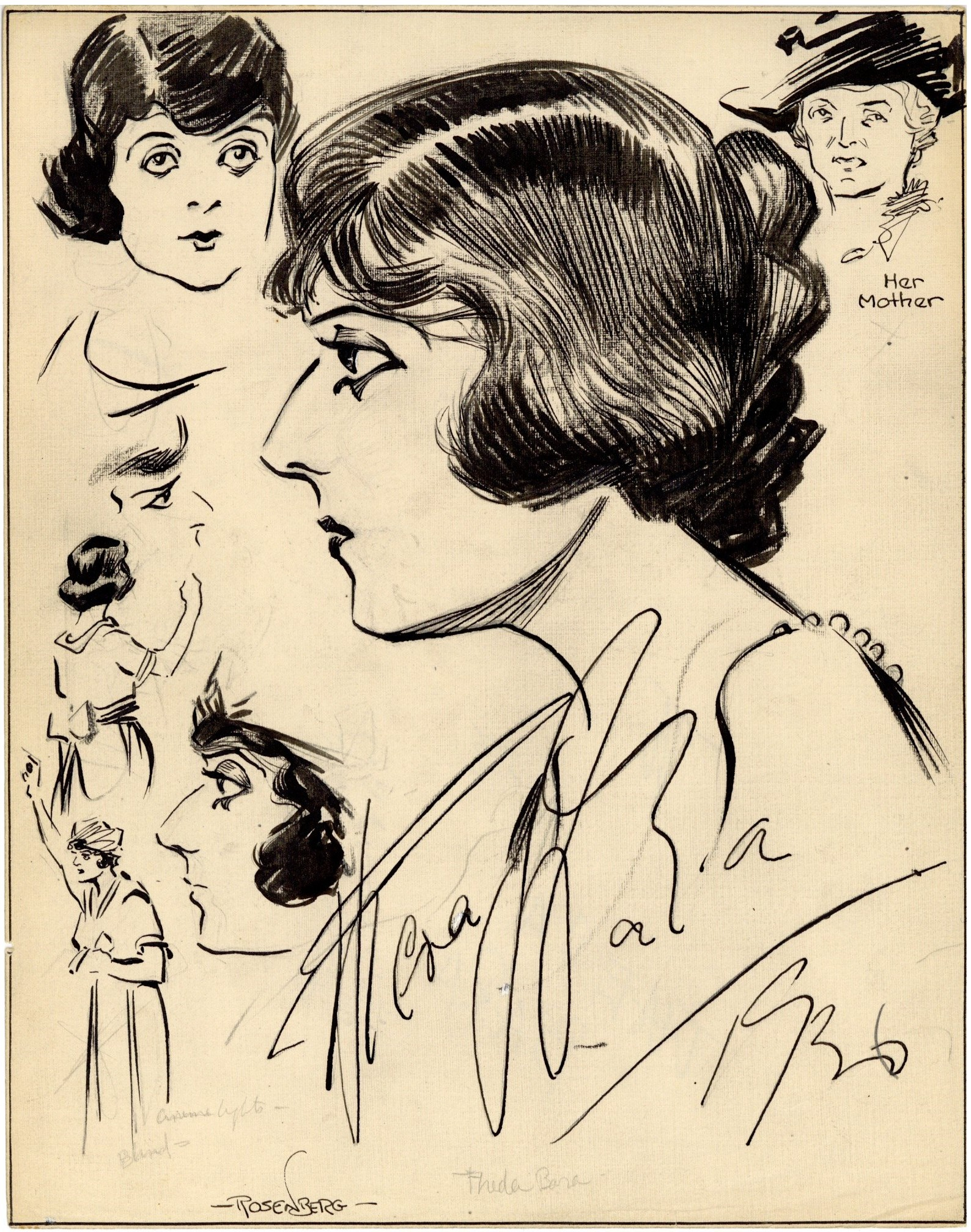
Manuel Rosenberg autographed sketch of fellow Cincinnatian, Theda Bara, 1921 The Cincinnati Post

The origin of Bara's stage name is disputed. The Guinness Book of Movie Facts and Feats says it came from director Frank Powell, who learned Theda had a relative named Baranger, and that Theda was a childhood nickname. In promoting the 1917 film Cleopatra, Fox Studio publicists noted that the name was an anagram of Arab death, and her press agents, to enhance her exotic appeal to moviegoers, falsely promoted the young Ohio native as "the daughter of an Arab sheik and a French woman, born in the Sahara". In 1917, the Goodman family legally changed its surname to Bara.

== Persona ==
Bara was known for wearing very revealing costumes in her films. Promoting an actress as mysterious, with an exotic background, was popular at that time. The studios promoted Bara with a massive publicity campaign, billing her as the Egyptian-born daughter of a French actress and an Italian sculptor. They claimed she had spent her early years in the Sahara under the shadow of the Great Sphinx of Giza and moved to France to become a stage actress. In fact, Bara never had been to Egypt, and her time in France amounted to just a few months.

A 2016 book by Joan Craig and Beverly F. Stout chronicles many personal, first-hand accounts of the lives of Bara and her husband Charles Brabin.

== Marriage and retirement ==
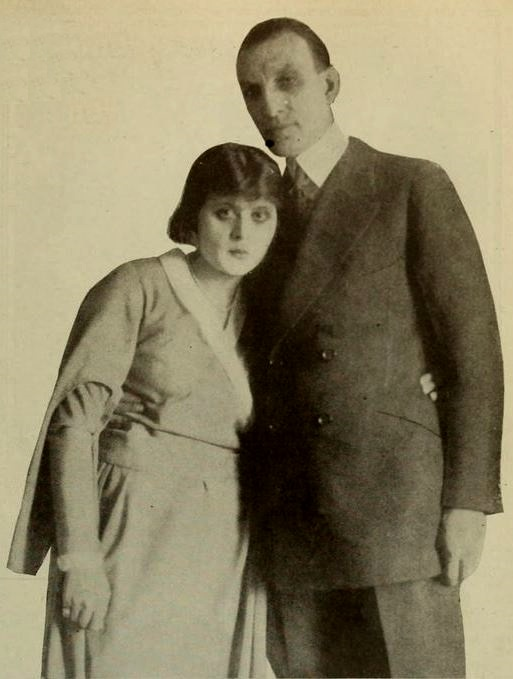
Bara with Charles Brabin, 1922

Bara married British-born American film director Charles Brabin in 1921. They honeymooned at The Pines Hotel in Digby, Nova Scotia, and later purchased a 400-hectare (990-acre) property in Harbourville, Nova Scotia, overlooking the Bay of Fundy, where they built a summer home they called Baranook. They had no children. Bara also owned and often enjoyed extended stays in a villa-style home in Cincinnati. The villa was later acquired by Xavier University, which used the house as a residence for nuns and then as the "honors villa" for students. The house was demolished in July 2011.

In 1936, she appeared on Lux Radio Theatre during a broadcast version of The Thin Man with William Powell and Myrna Loy. She did not appear in the play, but instead announced her plans to make a movie comeback, which never materialized. She appeared on radio again in 1939 as a guest on Texaco Star Theatre.

In 1949, producer Buddy DeSylva and Columbia Pictures expressed interest in making a movie of Bara's life, to star Betty Hutton, but the project never materialized.

== Death ==
On April 7, 1955, after a lengthy stay at California Lutheran Hospital in Los Angeles, Bara died of stomach cancer. She was survived by her husband, her mother, and her younger sister, Lori. She was cremated at Chapel of the Pines Crematory (disputed), and her remains were inurned under the name Theda Bara Brabin in the Great Mausoleum at Forest Lawn Memorial Park Cemetery in Glendale, California. Bara bequeathed $100,000 to her sister, $8,000 to her husband, and $1,000 to her sister-in-law.

== Legacy ==
Bara often is cited as the first film sex symbol.

For her contributions to the film industry, Bara received a motion pictures star on the Hollywood Walk of Fame in 1960. Her star is located at 6307 Hollywood Boulevard, and is shown in the film MaXXXine.

Bara never appeared in a sound film. The 1937 Fox vault fire destroyed most of the studio's films made before 1930; Bara made 43 films in total between 1914 and 1926, but complete prints of only six still exist. Five are partially lost and 32 are completely lost. The six films that survive are The Stain (1914), A Fool There Was (1915), East Lynne (1916), The Unchastened Woman (1925), Madame Mystery (1926), and 45 minutes from Hollywood (1926). The five films that survive in fragments are Cleopatra (1917) (1 minute worth of fragments), The Soul of Buddha (1918) (23 seconds worth of fragments), Salome (1918) (2 minutes worth of fragments), When a Woman Sins (1918) (23 seconds worth of fragments), and Lure of Ambition (1919) (43 seconds worth of fragments). Most of the clips can be seen in documentaries such as Theda Bara et William Fox (2001) and The Woman with the Hungry Eyes (2006). Additional footage has been found which shows her behind the scenes on a picture.

Some of her films and fragments of her films were rediscovered. The Stain (1914), Bara's only feature for Pathe, was rediscovered in the 1990s. A complete print of East Lynne (1916) was found in 1971; 23 seconds worth of surviving footage from When a Woman Sins was found in 2019, and were 43 seconds worth of surviving footage from Lure of Ambition (1919). Two minutes of surviving footage from Salome was discovered in 2021 by an intern at Filmoteca Española. In 2023, 40 seconds of additional footage from Cleopatra were found in a toy projector purchased on eBay by film researcher James Fennell. In 2025, a 23-second fragment of The Soul of Buddha was discovered in the documentary Theda Bara et William Fox (2001).

Critics stated that her portrayal of calculating, cold-hearted women was morally instructive to men. Bara responded, "I will continue doing vampires as long as people sin."

In 1994, she was honored with her image on a U.S. postage stamp designed by caricaturist Al Hirschfeld. The Fort Lee Film Commission dedicated Main Street and Linwood Avenue in Fort Lee, New Jersey, as "Theda Bara Way" in May 2006 to honor Bara, who made many of her films at the Fox Studio on Linwood and Main.

Over a period of several years, filmmaker and film historian Phillip Dye reconstructed Cleopatra on video. Titled Lost Cleopatra, the full-length feature was created by editing together production-still picture montages combined with the surviving film clip. The script was based on the original scenario, with modifications derived from research into censorship reports, reviews of the film, and synopses from period magazines. Dye screened the film at the Hollywood Heritage Museum on February 8, 2017.

== Filmography ==
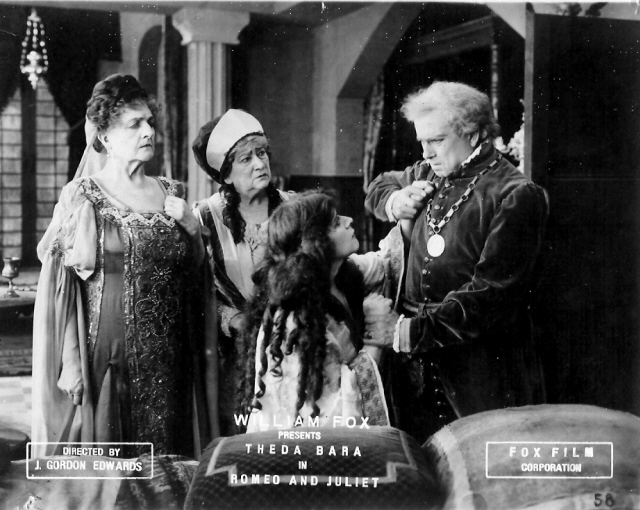
Romeo and Juliet (1916) with actors (from left): Helen Tracy, Alice Gale, Bara, and Edward Holt

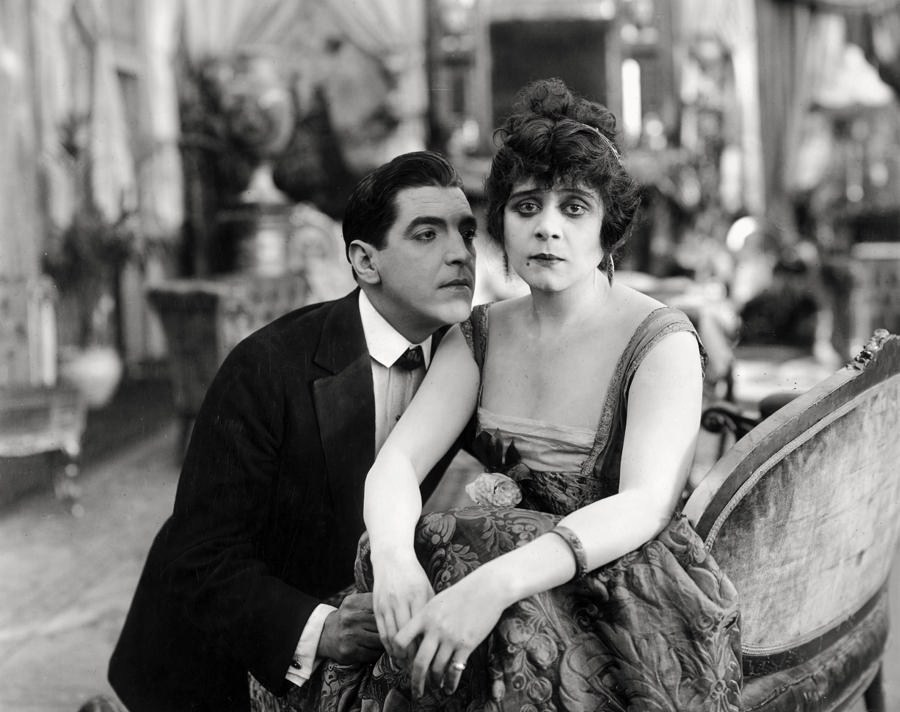
Bara with Alan Roscoe in Camille (1917)

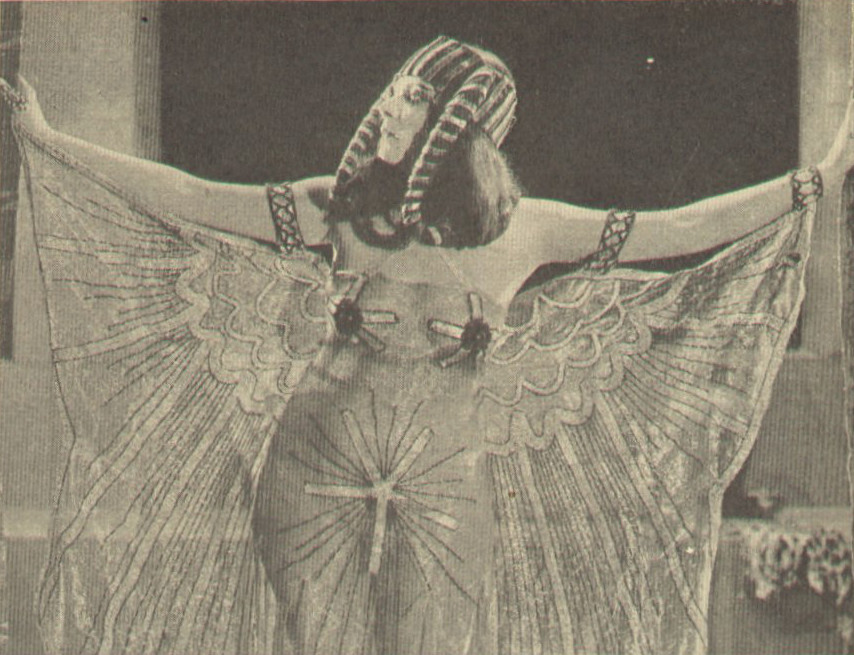
Bara in Cleopatra (1917)

Year	Film	Role	Notes
1914	The Stain	Gang moll	Extant Credited as Theodosia Goodman, presumed lost until a copy was found in the 1990s
1915	A Fool There Was	The Vampire	Extant
1915	The Kreutzer Sonata	Celia Friedlander	Lost film
1915	The Clemenceau Case	Iza	Lost film
1915	The Devil's Daughter	Gioconda Dianti	Lost film
1915	Lady Audley's Secret	Helen Talboys	Lost film
1915	The Two Orphans	Henriette	Lost film
1915	Sin	Rosa	Lost film
1915	Carmen	Carmen	Lost film
1915	The Galley Slave	Francesca Brabaut	Lost film
1915	Destruction	Fernade	Lost film
1916	The Serpent	Vania Lazar	Lost film
1916	Gold and the Woman	Theresa Decordova	Lost film
1916	The Eternal Sapho	Laura Bruffins	Lost film
1916	East Lynne	Lady Isabel Carlisle	Extant Presumed lost until a copy was discovered in 1971.
1916	Under Two Flags	Cigarette	Lost film
1916	Her Double Life	Mary Doone	Lost film
1916	Romeo and Juliet	Juliet	Lost film
1916	The Vixen	Elsie Drummond	Lost film
1917	The Darling of Paris	Esmeralda	Lost film
1917	The Tiger Woman	Princess Petrovitch	Lost film
1917	Her Greatest Love	Hazel	Lost film
1917	Heart and Soul	Jess	Lost film
1917	Camille	Marguerite Gauthier	Lost film
1917	Cleopatra	Cleopatra	1 minute survives
1917	The Rose of Blood	Lisza Tapenka	Lost film
1917	Madame Du Barry	Jeanne Vaubernier	Lost film
1918	The Forbidden Path	Mary Lynde	Lost film
1918	The Soul of Buddha	Priestess	A 23-second clip survives from the documentary Theda Bara et William Fox (2001).
1918	Under the Yoke	Maria Valverda	Lost film
1918	Salomé	Salome	2 minutes survive
1918	When a Woman Sins	Lilian Marchard / Poppea	23 seconds survive
1918	The She-Devil	Lolette	Lost film
1919	The Light	Blanchette Dumond, aka Madame Lefresne	Lost film
1919	When Men Desire	Marie Lohr	Lost film
1919	The Siren's Song	Marie Bernais	Lost film
1919	A Woman There Was	Princess Zara	Lost film
1919	Kathleen Mavourneen	Kathleen Cavanagh	Lost film
1919	La Belle Russe	Fleurett Sackton/La Belle Russe	Lost film
1919	The Lure of Ambition	Olga Dolan	43 seconds survive
1925	The Unchastened Woman	Caroline Knollys	Extant
1926	Madame Mystery	Madame Mysterieux	Extant Short film
1926	45 Minutes from Hollywood	Herself	Extant Short film

== Cultural references ==
- The short piano suite Silhouettes from the Screen, Op. 55 (1919) by Mortimer Wilson includes a miniature musical portrait of Theda Bara, who is portrayed in an atonal, expressionistic style.
- Bara is referenced in the 1921 Bert Kalmar/Harry Ruby song "Rebecca Came Back from Mecca" as well as their 1922 "Sheik From Avenue B", sung by Fanny Brice.
- Bara was one of three actresses (Pola Negri and Mae Murray were the others) whose eyes were combined to form the Chicago International Film Festival's logo, a stark, black-and-white close-up of the composite eyes set as repeated frames in a strip of film.
- The International Times' logo is a black-and-white image of Theda Bara. The founders' intention had been to use an image of actress Clara Bow, 1920s "It girl", but a picture of Theda Bara was used by accident, and once deployed, not changed.
- During a scene from 2004 film The Aviator when Howard Hughes and Glenn Odekirk are trying to create the H-1 Racer, Odekirk remarks, "Yeah, well, I want a date with Theda Bara, but that ain't gonna happen either."
- Multiple references to Bara are in the X film series. In the 2022 film Pearl, the titular character, portrayed by Mia Goth, feeds an alligator that she has named Theda; the movie theater she visits also has a poster for Bara's movie Cleopatra. In the 2024 film MaXXXine, the titular character, also portrayed by Goth, is seen putting out her cigarette on the Theda Bara Hollywood Walk of Fame star.
- Bara is a central figure in the play On Set with Theda Bara, written by Joey Merlo, directed by Jack Serio, and performed by David Greenspan at the Brick Theater in New York City in 2024.
- A photograph of Bara as Cleopatra was used as the cover of the Lumineers' 2016 album Cleopatra.
- In an episode of The Munsters (season one, episode 33, "Lily Munster, Girl Model", first aired on May 6, 1965), the character Lily Munster (portrayed by Yvonne De Carlo) is interviewing for a job as a fashion model with a fashion designer character named Laszlo Brastoff (portrayed by Roger C. Carmel), and Brastoff remarks that with the exotic and mysterious appeal of his new line of dresses, he is trying to recreate the kind of allure that was reflected by women like Theda Bara, whom he notes was called "'the Vamp'. That's short for 'vampire'."
