= J. Gordon Edwards filmography =

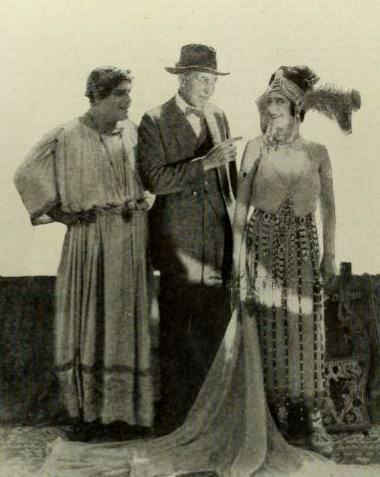
Jacques Grétillat, J. Gordon Edwards, and Paulette Duval during the production of Nero (1922)

J. Gordon Edwards (1867–1925) was a Canadian American film director, screenwriter, and producer of the silent era. He made 54 feature films between 1914 and 1924 but only 3 are known to exist in full and another 5 are partially lost which means that 46 are completely lost. (Note: In addition to his generally recognized work, the copyright registration for 1915's The Celebrated Scandal states that Edwards "picturized" the film. The American Film Institute's opinion is that Edwards may have worked on a discarded earlier version, but did not contribute to the picture as released.) He is perhaps best known for directing twenty-three films starring vamp actress Theda Bara—including Cleopatra, her most famous role— and also the 1921 epic The Queen of Sheba. Edwards was born in Montreal and educated at a military academy with the expectation that he would pursue a career as a British Army officer. He decided against a life in the military in favor of a future in theater. At the time, the Canadian theater and film industry was limited primarily to repertory theatre, so Edwards became one of many to emigrate to the United States to work in the field. He had a short career as an actor before becoming a stage director. By 1910, he was working for American motion picture producer William Fox, who sent him to Europe to study film production.

In 1914, the Balboa Amusement Producing Company produced the drama St. Elmo. Balboa was not a film distributor, and had a standing agreement to sell its films to Fox's Box Office Attractions Company for distribution. Some modern writers credit this film as Edwards's directorial debut. However, contemporary sources named Bertram Bracken in that role, as does the American Film Institute. Aubrey Solomon's history of the Fox Film Corporation states Bracken "reportedly" directed. Regardless of Edwards's role in St. Elmo, he was chosen to direct Life's Shop Window (1914), Box Office Attractions' first film as a production company rather than merely a distributor.

The following year, the Box Office Attractions name was replaced with the newly incorporated Fox Film Corporation. Edwards remained one of the studio's most important directors and one of William Fox's closest advisers. He became known for his epic filmmaking and for a permissive approach to directing his starring cast, an attitude that led Bara's biographer to compare him to Alfred Hitchcock. Often, that cast included Bara, whose films with him include Under Two Flags (1916), the epic historical drama Cleopatra (1917), and A Woman There Was (1919).

Despite his influential role in the early days of Fox Films, the financial success of many of his movies, and public recognition of his talent as his director—compared by one contemporary reviewer to D. W. Griffith—Edwards is now mostly forgotten. Nearly all of his work is lost, including all of the titles he was best known for. Film historian Kevin Brownlow described him as a "lost name of film history". Essentially all of his films (other than a few low quality prints) for Fox Studios were lost in the 1937 Fox vault fire, which claimed 75% of all Fox films made before 1930. Film director Blake Edwards, stated in his commentary for the Pink Panther (1963) DVD, "My grandfather was a very prominent filmmaker. I don't know an awful lot about him, other than that he was a very important filmmaker, and that most of his films... all of his films, really, were destroyed in the Long Island fire. And he was considered one of the top directors of his time."

== Filmography ==
J. Gordon Edwards directed all films except where otherwise noted.

Key
#	Considered to be lost

Box Office Attractions Company (1914)

Release date (Note: Fox Film's official release dates are shown; in some cases, premieres or special showing preceded this date.)	Title	Based on	Notes	Ref
August 1914	St. Elmo#	St. Elmo, novel by Augusta Jane Evans	Some sources credit Bertram Bracken as the director.	
19 November 1914	Life's Shop Window#	Life's Shop Window, novel by Victoria Cross	First film produced by the Box Office Attractions Company. Premiered 20 October 1914 at the Academy of Music, New York.	

=== Fox Film Corporation (1915–24) ===
Release date	Title	Based on	Notes	Ref
5 April 1915	Anna Karenina #	Anna Karenina, novel by Leo Tolstoy		
16 May 1915	A Woman's Resurrection#	Resurrection, novel by Leo Tolstoy		
5 July 1915	Should a Mother Tell?#	Original story by Rex Ingram	The working title was A Mother's Love.	
13 September 1915	The Song of Hate#	La Tosca, play by Victorien Sardou		
9 November 1915	The Blindness of Devotion#	Original story by Rex Ingram	Edwards was also the scenerist. Film debuts of Robert B. Mantell and Genevieve Hamper. Some sources give the title as The Blindness of Devotion.	
28 November 1915	The Galley Slave#	The Galley Slave, play by Bartley Campbell	Edwards's first film with Theda Bara.	
6 December 1915	The Unfaithful Wife#	Original story by Mary Murillo		
2 January 1916	The Green-Eyed Monster#	Original story by Mary Murillo		
27 March 1916	A Wife's Sacrifice#	Original story by J. Gordon Edwards	Edwards was also the scenerist.	
28 May 1916	The Spider and the Fly #	Original story by Franklin B. Coates		
31 July 1916	Under Two Flags#	Under Two Flags, novel by Ouida	Reissued 26 January 1919.	
11 September 1916	Her Double Life#	"The New Magdelen", original story by Mary Murillo		
17 October 1916	A Daughter of the Gods#	Original story by Herbert Brenon	Herbert Brenon directed; Edwards served as production supervisor. First complete nude scene by a major star (Annette Kellerman). Reissued 2 December 1917 (as Daughter of the Gods), August 1918, and 15 February 1920.	
23 October 1916	Romeo and Juliet#	Romeo and Juliet, play by William Shakespeare		
4 December 1916	The Vixen#	Original story by Mary Murillo	Released in the United Kingdom as The Love Pirate	
22 January 1917	The Darling of Paris#	The Hunchback of Notre-Dame, novel by Victor Hugo	Reissued 16 February 1919 (as The Darlings of Paris)	
19 February 1917	The Tiger Woman#	"Quicksands", original story by Adrian Johnson	Released in the United Kingdom as Behind a Throne	
2 April 1917	Her Greatest Love#	Moths, novel by Ouida	Released in the United Kingdom as Redemption	
2 April 1917	Tangled Lives#	The Woman in White, novel by Wilkie Collins		
20 May 1917	Heart and Soul#	Jess, novel by H. Rider Haggard	Working titles were Jess and The Greater Love. Some sources give 21 May as release date.	
30 September 1917	Camille#	The Lady of the Camellias, novel by Alexandre Dumas, fils		
14 October 1917	Cleopatra#	Antony and Cleopatra and Julius Caesar, plays by William Shakespeare; Cléopâtre, play by Victorien Sardou and Émile Moreau	Premiered 14 October 1917 at the Lyric Theatre in New York. Reissued 15 February 1920. 1 minute survives	
4 November 1917	The Rose of Blood#	"The Red Rose", original story by Richard Ordynski		
30 December 1917	Madame Du Barry#	Joseph Balsamo, novel by Alexandre Dumas	Some sources give the title as Du Barry.	
3 February 1918	The Forbidden Path#	"From the Depths", original story by E. Lloyd Sheldon		
21 April 1918	The Soul of Buddha#	Original story by Adrian Johnson and Theda Bara.	Eve Golden's biography of Bara considers it unlikely she had any part in the screenwriting. 23 seconds survives from the documentary Theda Bara et William Fox (2001).	
9 June 1918	Under the Yoke#	"Maria, of the Roses", original story by George Scarborough.	Spanish Love was a working title.	
29 September 1918	When a Woman Sins#	"The Message of the Lillies", original story by Betta Breuil.	23 seconds survive	
6 October 1918	Salomé#	Antiquities of the Jews, work by Titus Flavius Josephus	Premiered in Seattle on 10 August 1918 and in New York on 6 October 1918. Reissued 15 February 1920 and 14 January 1923. 2 minutes survives	
1 December 1918	The She-Devil#	Original story by George James Hopkins	Edwards was also the scenerist. Some sources have the release date as 10 November.	
12 January 1919	The Light#	Original story by Luther Reed and Brett Page		
9 March 1919	When Men Desire#	"The Scarlet Altars", original story by E. Lloyd Sheldon and J. Searle Dawley		
4 May 1919	The Siren's Song#	Original story by Charles Kenyon		
1 June 1919	A Woman There Was#	"Creation's Tears", original story by Neje Hopkins.	Bara's biography identifies Neje Hopkins as George James Hopkins. This was Bara's last film with Edwards.	
29 June 1919	The Lone Star Ranger#	The Lone Star Ranger, novel by Zane Grey	Reissued 18 September 1921.	
10 August 1919	Wolves of the Night#	Original story by E. Lloyd Sheldon	Reissued 24 August 1924.	
12 October 1919	The Last of the Duanes#	"The Last of the Duanes", short story by Zane Grey		
24 November 1919	Wings of the Morning#	Wings of the Morning, novel by Louis Tracy		
25 January 1920	Heart Strings#	Original story by Henry Albert Phillips	Some sources have 18 January as the release date.	
14 March 1920	The Adventurer #	Original story by E. Lloyd Sheldon	Some sources list a release date in February.	
18 April 1920	The Orphan#	The Orphan, novel by Clarence E. Mulford	Some sources list a release date in May.	
27 June 1920	The Joyous Trouble-Makers#	The Joyous Troublemaker, novel by Jackson Gregory	Referred to in some sources as The Joyous Troublemakers, The Joyous Trouble Maker, or The Trouble Makers.	
22 August 1920	If I Were King	If I Were King, novel and play by Justin Huntly McCarthy		
24 October 1920	Drag Harlan	Drag Harlan, novel by Charles Alden Seltzer	Reissued 22 February 1925.	
12 December 1920	The Scuttlers#	The Scuttlers, novel by Clyde C. Westover	Reissued 9 November 1924.	
17 April 1921	His Greatest Sacrifice#	Original story by Paul H. Sloane		
11 December 1921	The Queen of Sheba#	Original story by Virginia Tracy	Edwards was also the scenerist. Tom Mix supervised the chariot race. Premiered 4 Sep 1921. 17 seconds survives.	
7 September 1922	Nero#	Original story by Virginia Tracy and Charles Sarver	Premiered in New York on 22 May.	
9 September 1923	The Silent Command	Original story by Rufus King	Premiered at the Fox Oakland in Oakland, California on 25 August. Released in France as His Country	
25 November 1923	The Shepherd King#	The Shepherd King, play by Wright Lorimer and Arnold Reeves		
2 December 1923	The Net#	The Woman's Law, novel by Maravene Thompson		
31 August 1924	It Is the Law#	It Is the Law, play by Elmer Rice and Hayden Talbot		

== Bibliography ==
- Brownlow, Kevin (1976) [1968]. The Parade's Gone By.... University of California Press. ISBN 978-0-520-03068-8.
- Geczy, Adam (2013). Fashion and Orientalism: Dress, Textiles and Culture from the 17th to the 21st Century. Bloomsbury Academic. ISBN 978-1-84788-599-9.
- Ginini, Ronald (2012) [1996]. Theda Bara: A Biography of the Silent Screen Vamp, with a Filmography (Reprint ed.). McFarland. ISBN 978-0-7864-6918-5.
- Goble, Alan (1999). The Complete Index to Literary Sources in Film. Bowker-Saur. ISBN 978-1-85739-229-6.
- Golden, Eve (1996). Vamp: The Rise and Fall of Theda Bara. Vestal Press. ISBN 978-1-879511-32-3.
- Justice, Fred C.; Smith, Tom R., eds. (1914). Who's Who in the Film World. Film World Publishing. OCLC 8807170.
- Keister, Doug (2011). Stories in Stone New York: A Field Guide to New York City Area Cemeteries & Their Residents. Gibbs Smith. ISBN 978-1-4236-2102-7.
- Langman, Larry (1998). American Film Cycles: The Silent Era. Bibliographies and Indexes in the Performing Arts. Greenwood. ISBN 978-0-673-52500-0.
- Morris, Peter (1992). Embattled Shadows: A History of Canadian Cinema, 1895–1939. Mcgill Queens University Press. ISBN 978-0-7735-0323-6.
- Ramsaye, Terry (1964) [1926]. A Million and One Nights: A History of the Motion Picture. Routledge. ISBN 978-0-7146-1588-2.
- Rhodes, Gary D. (1997). Lugosi: His Life in Films, on Stage, and in the Hearts of Horror Lovers. McFarland & Company. ISBN 978-0-7864-2765-9.
- Robertson, James Crighton (1993). The Hidden Cinema: British Film Censorship in Action, 1913–1975. Routledge. ISBN 978-0-415-09034-6.
- Slide, Anthony (2001). The New Historical Dictionary of the American Film Industry (2nd ed.). Scarecrow Press. ISBN 978-1-57886-015-9.
- Solomon, Aubrey (2011). The Fox Film Corporation, 1915–1935: A History and Filmography. McFarland & Company. ISBN 978-0-7864-6286-5.
- Tillmany, Jack; Dowling, Jennifer (2006). Theatres of Oakland. Arcadia Publishing. ISBN 978-0-7385-4681-0.
