= Vendetta! =

1886 romance by Marie Corelli

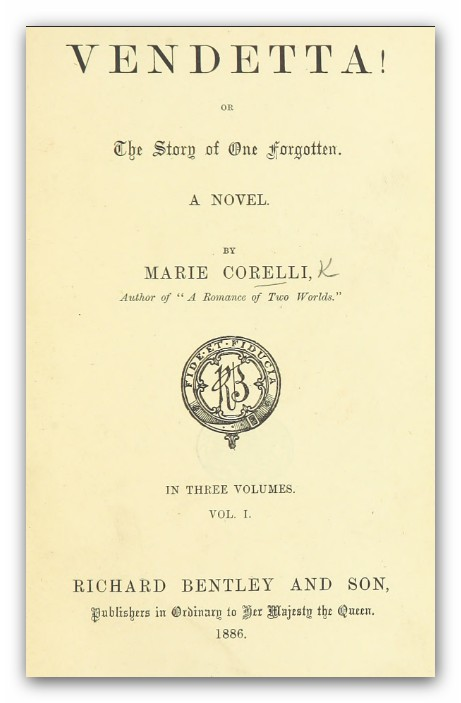
- Title page of an early edition of Vendetta.
- Author: Marie Corelli
- Language: English
- Genre: Romance
- Publisher: George Bentley
- Publication date: August 1886
- Publication place: United Kingdom
- Media type: Print (Hardcover)

Vendetta!, or The Story of One Forgotten is an 1886 romance novel by Marie Corelli. Corelli's second novel, it tells the story of an Italian count who, after being mistakenly declared dead, returns home to find his wife romantically involved with his best friend and seeks revenge on them both. The book was a popular success, but received tepid notices from critics.

== Synopsis ==
Vendetta is told in the first person. The narrator, Fabio Romani, is an Italian count. Amidst a cholera outbreak in Naples, Romani is mistakenly pronounced dead and placed in a coffin in an above-ground family tomb. He awakens and manages to escape from his coffin. Inside the tomb, he finds a cache of valuable treasure hidden by the brigand Carmelo Neri and his gang. When he returns home, he finds that his wife, Nina, and his best friend, Guido Ferrari, are continuing a long-standing affair, and that neither mourns his death.

Romani decides to seek revenge against Nina and Guido. He adopts the persona "Cesare Oliva", a wealthy bachelor. Nina is unable to recognize her husband, in part because his hair has turned white from shock, and because he wears dark glasses. After Guido dies of wounds sustained in a duel, Romani (as "Oliva") proposes to Nina. On their wedding day, he reveals his identity to Nina, who dies as a result of being crushed by a rock dislodged in an earthquake.

== Publication ==
Marie Corelli's publisher, George Bentley, advised her that her second novel should avoid the supernatural themes which occupied her first, A Romance of Two Worlds. Corelli sent the manuscript for Vendetta to Bentley on 8 March 1886, just two weeks after the publication of A Romance of Two Worlds. Bentley was happy with the story, though he advised that it be condensed in places, and he gave it the title Vendetta, rather than Corelli's original choice, Buried Alive. Corelli signed a contract with Bentley on 19 July, receiving 50 pounds immediately, plus an additional 50 conditional on sales reaching 550 copies. She dedicated the book to the popular actor Wilson Barrett. The book was published in August 1886.

== Reception ==
Critics generally described Vendetta as entertaining but unserious. The World described it as "pure and unadulterated melodrama". The critic George Sala wrote of the book in the Illustrated London News:

I am reading Vendetta with a wet cloth round my head, and my feet in a basin of iced and camphorated water; but ere I reach the end of the Signora or Signorina Corelli's appalling romance, dreadful consequences will, I fear, accrue. Possibly, human gore, Naples, the cholera, matrimony (very much matrimony), jealousy, the stiletto, and the Silent Tomb in which brigands have buried their treasures! I shudder; But I continue to read Vendetta, just as, when I was a child, I used to shudder over the Mysteries of Udolpho.

The book was a popular success, and by 1910 it was in its 37th edition with Methuen, which was by then Corelli's main publisher.

== Adaptations and translations ==
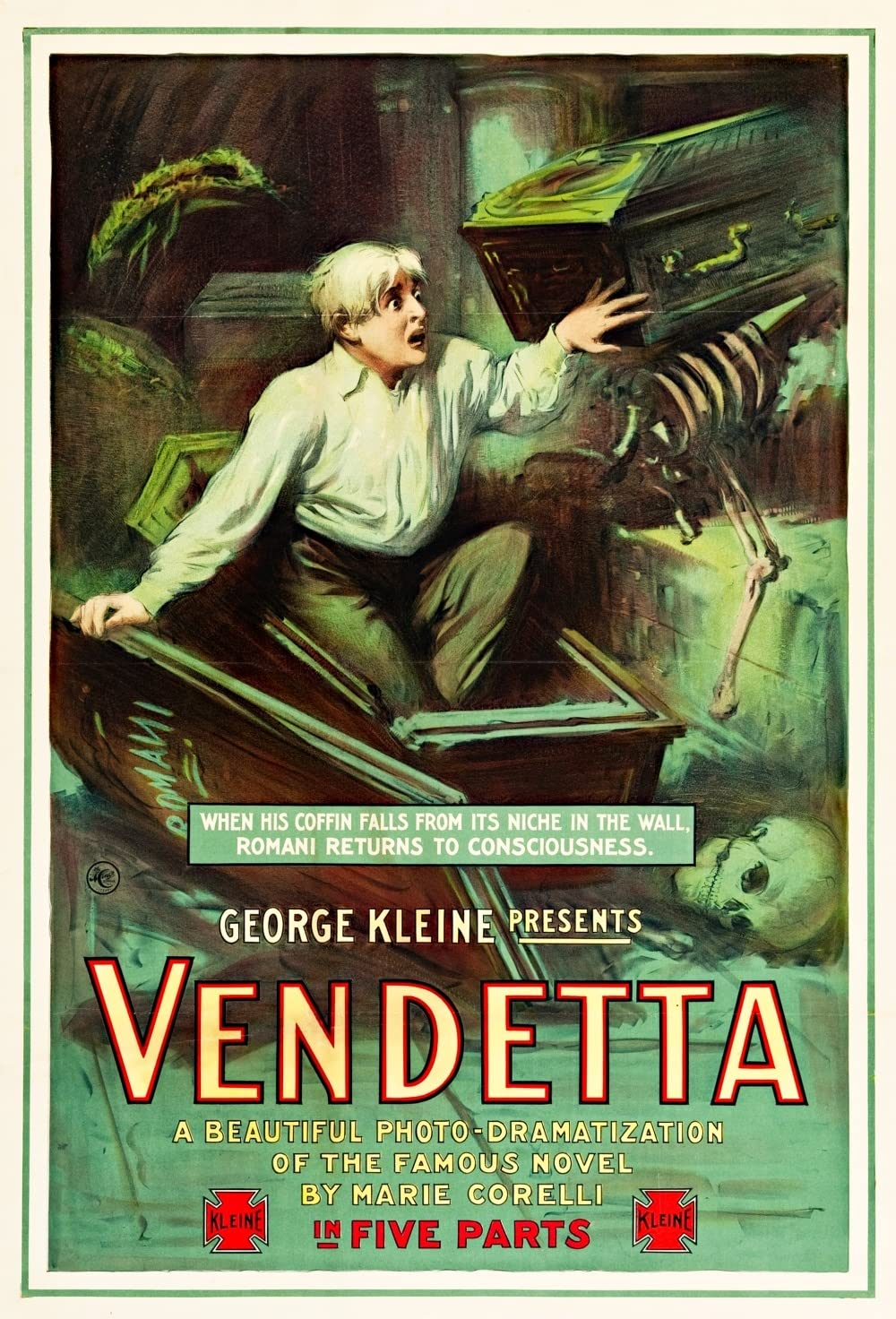
Poster advertising the 1914 silent film adaptation, depicting Fabio Romani emerging from his coffin in the Romani family tomb.

Vendetta was translated into Japanese by Kuroiwa Shūroku and serialized in the newspaper Yorozu Chouhou.

Actress and producer Lillie Langtry apparently discussed adapting the story to the stage, with Langtry to play the part of Nina, though this failed to materialize. An Australian theatrical adaptation was staged by W. J. Lincoln in 1900 under the title The Power of Wealth.

It was adapted into a silent feature film of the same name in 1914. The film was produced by the French studio Studio Éclipse and directed by René Hervil and Louis Mercanton. It was distributed in the United States by George Kleine. It was also the subject of a 1929 German silent film adaptation, Circumstantial Evidence.

It was also made into a feature film by Fox in 1915, in the United States, under the title The Unfaithful Wife, starring Robert B. Mantell.
