= Marie Booth Russell =

English actress

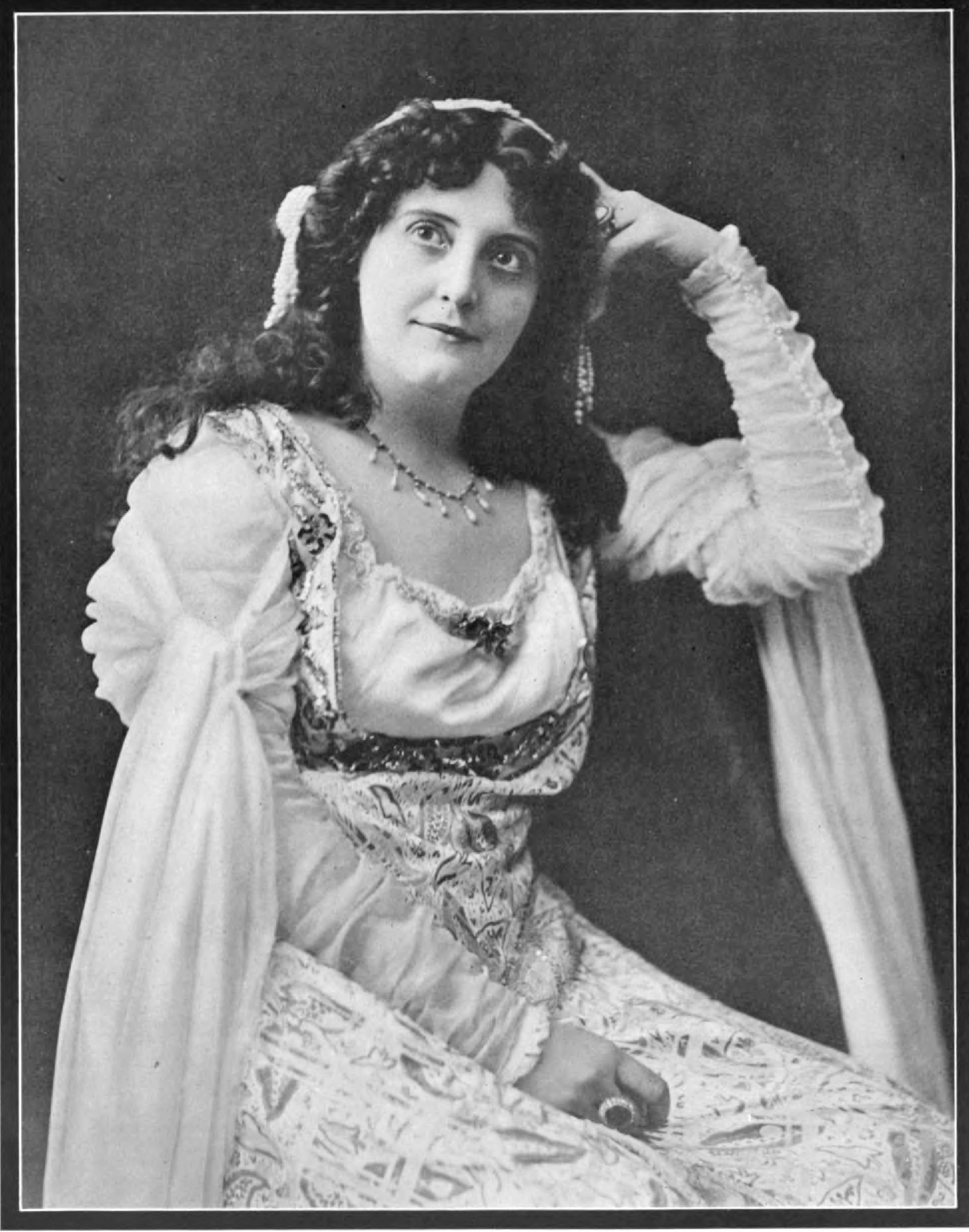
- Marie Booth Russell as Juliet in 1909.
- Born: 1874; Brooklyn, New York
- Died: October 31, 1911 (aged 36–37); Atlantic Highlands, New Jersey
- Occupation: Actress
- Spouse: Robert B. Mantell (m. 1899)
- Children: 1

Marie Booth Russell (1874 – October 31, 1911) was an English actress.

== Early life ==
Marie Booth Russell was born in Brooklyn. She attended St. Joseph's Academy in Flushing, and Emerson College in Boston.

== Career ==
Russell appeared many times on Broadway, often in Shakespeare dramas with her husband, including Othello (1904, 1905, 1907, 1909), Richard III (1904, 1907, 1909), King Lear (1905, 1907, 1909), Macbeth (1905, 1907, 1909), Hamlet (1905, 1909), The Merchant of Venice (1907), Julius Caesar (1907), King John (1909), and Romeo and Juliet (1909). She was also in several Broadway productions of Richelieu (1904, 1905, 1907, 1909, 1911), The Light of Other Days (1903), and in Louis XI (1909).

"Miss Russell has very beautiful eyes," commented one American reviewer in 1907, "but she uses them too noticeably, which detracts from her work." Her physical performance continued to draw criticism. "A worse exhibition of wriggling, writhing, moaning, gurgling, and mouthing cannot be imagined than she indulged in," commented another American reviewer in 1909, adding "If only she could learn the value of simplicity and naturalness." An obituary put the issue diplomatically, saying "Her acting was more satisfying to the public than to the critics."

Russell was an enthusiastic horsewoman. She also wrote articles for magazines, and was public in her support for women's suffrage.

== Personal life ==
Marie Booth Russell had a daughter, Louisa (born 1894), from an early marriage. She became the third wife of British actor Robert B. Mantell in 1899, and helped to raise his daughter, Ethel (born 1895). She died in 1911, at her home in Atlantic Highlands, New Jersey, aged 37 years, after "a malady of long standing gradually gained the mastery over her strong constitution," or kidney disease complicated by pneumonia. Russell's protegee, American actress Genevieve Hamper, became Mantell's fourth and last wife.
