= John Alexander (actor) =

American actor (1897–1982)

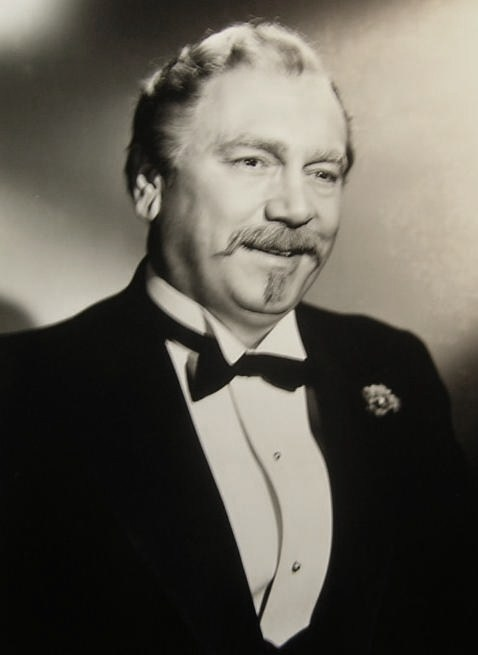
- Alexander in New Orleans (1947)
- Born: November 29, 1897; Newport, Kentucky, U.S.
- Died: July 13, 1982 (aged 84); New York City, U.S.
- Occupation: Actor
- Years active: 1908–1965
- Spouse: Genevieve Hamper (m. 1928; died 1971)

John Alexander (November 29, 1897 – July 13, 1982) was an American stage, film, and television actor.

== Early life ==
He was born on November 29, 1897, in Newport, Kentucky. His father owned steamboats and his mother was a telegraph operator.

== Career ==
He had a career spanning more than 55 years on Broadway with his first role as the title character in Elmer Brown, the Only Boy in Town in 1908/1909.

He is best remembered for his performance as Teddy Brewster, a lunatic who thinks he is Theodore Roosevelt, in the 1944 classic film Arsenic and Old Lace opposite Cary Grant. He had previously portrayed that role in the 1941 Broadway play of the same name on which the film was based. He went on to play the "real" Roosevelt in the 1950 Bob Hope comedy Fancy Pants and reprised his role as Teddy "Roosevelt" Brewster in the 1955 TV adaptation of Arsenic and Old Lace in the anthology series The Best of Broadway.

Among his other notable film roles, Alexander played Steve Edwards in A Tree Grows in Brooklyn in 1945, Mr. McComber in Summer Holiday in 1948, Jack Riker in Winchester '73 in 1950 and Howard Shipley in The Marrying Kind in 1952.

During the 1950s and early 1960, he guest starred on television series, such as The Phil Silvers Show, Adventures of the Sea Hawk and Car 54, Where Are You? Alexander's last performance was as Mayor Crane in the Broadway comedy Never Too Late, a role he had played since 1962.

Alexander died on July 13, 1982, in New York City. He is buried in the Actors Fund of America plot in Kensico Cemetery in Valhalla, New York.

== Partial filmography ==
- Baby Take a Bow (1934) - Ragpicker (uncredited)
- The Ghost Rider (1935) - Sheriff
- The Arizonian (1935) - Billy (uncredited)
- Special Agent (1935) - Arcade Manager (uncredited)
- Polo Joe (1936) - William the Waiter (uncredited)
- On Such a Night (1937) - District Attorney
- Flowing Gold (1940) - Sheriff
- Calling All Husbands (1940) - Sheriff Ben Barnes
- Mr. Skeffington (1944) - Jim Conderley
- The Doughgirls (1944) - Warren Buckley
- Arsenic and Old Lace (1944) - 'Teddy Roosevelt' Brewster
- A Tree Grows in Brooklyn (1945) - Steve Edwards
- The Horn Blows at Midnight (1945) - First Trumpeter / Doremus
- Junior Miss (1945) - J. B. Curtis
- It Shouldn't Happen to a Dog (1946) - Joe Parelli
- The Jolson Story (1946) - Lew Dockstader
- New Orleans (1947) - Colonel McArdle
- Living in a Big Way (1947) - Attorney Ambridge
- Cass Timberlane (1947) - Dr. Roy Drover
- Where There's Life (1947) - Mr. Herbert Jones
- Summer Holiday (1948) - Mr. Dave McComber
- Night Has a Thousand Eyes (1948) - Mr. Gilman
- Winchester '73 (1950) - Jack Riker
- Fancy Pants (1950) - Teddy Roosevelt
- The Sleeping City (1950) - Police Insp. Gordon
- The Model and the Marriage Broker (1951) - Mr. Perry
- The Marrying Kind (1952) - Howard Shipley
- Untamed Frontier (1952) - Max Wickersham
- The Mugger (1958) - Chief of Police
- The Man in the Net (1959) - Mr. Carey
- One Foot in Hell (1960) - Sam Giller - Storekeeper
- The Right Man (1960 TV movie) - Wendell Mike
