= The Spider and the Fly (1916 film) =

1916 film directed by J. Gordon Edwards

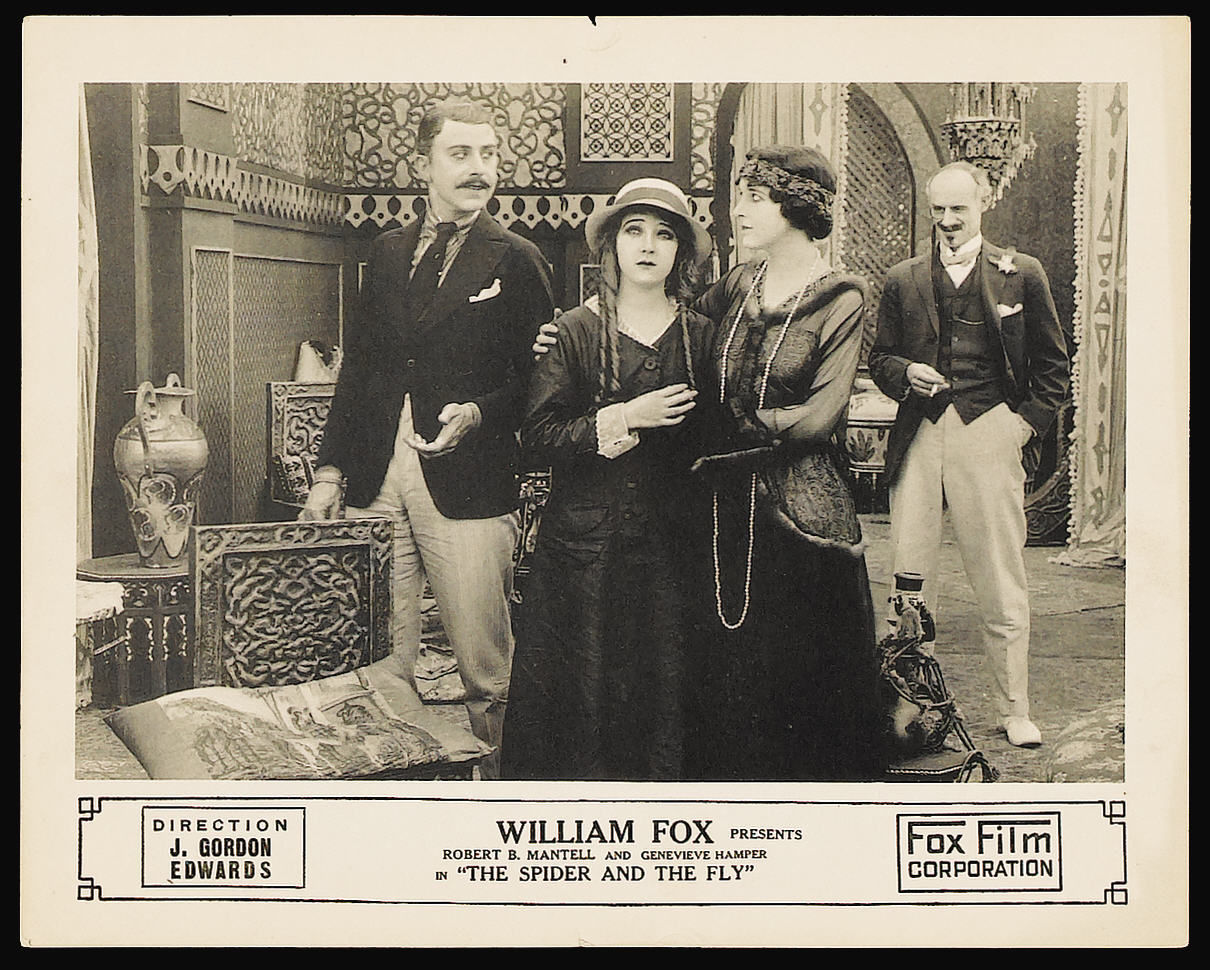
Lobby card

The Spider and the Fly is a 1916 silent drama film directed by J. Gordon Edwards and starring Robert B. Mantell, Genevieve Hamper, Stuart Holmes, and Genevieve Blinn. The film was produced by William Fox and distributed by Fox Film.

== Plot ==
The story follows Delano a young Frenchman who, after killing his best friend in a drunken fight, vows to never touch alcohol again. However, his ressolve is tested when he encounters the seductive Blanche Le Noir, who acts as the metophorical "Spider"in this narrative. Blanche lures him back to the life of alcoholism and vice. The film further complicates the drama with the introduction of a sinister character named Lantier, whom Blanche prefers. She eventually tries to use Lantier's daughter to further her own manipulative ends, though the child is eventually saved through the intervention of other characters.

== Cast ==
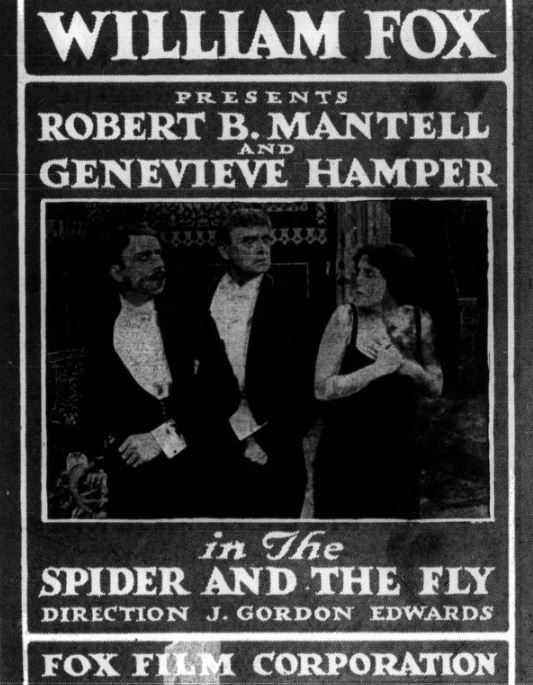
Advertisement

- Robert B. Mantell as Delano
- Genevieve Hamper as Blanche Le Noir
- Stuart Holmes as Lantier
- Genevieve Blinn as Gervaise

== Production ==
’’The 26 February 1916 Motography noted that to film some scenes, director J. Gordon Edwards used his own invention, an "automatic camera," that required no cameraman’’, indicates the American Film Institute.

== Preservation status ==
The film is considered a lost film.

== Reception ==
Wid’s found the film very melodramatic" and the story "burdened with scores of very long and very emphatic melodramatic titles, which will register big with some audiences and seem funny to others”.
