= Jess (novel) =

1887 novel by H. Rider Haggard

- Author: H. Rider Haggard
- Language: English
- Genre: Adventure novel
- Publisher: Smith, Elder & Co.
- Publication date: 1887
- Publication place: United Kingdom

Jess is a novel by British writer H. Rider Haggard, set in South Africa.

== Background ==
Haggard wrote the book in 1885, primarily in his chambers where he was working as a barrister. King Solomon's Mines had been an enormous success but Haggard says he had been "somewhat piqued by the frequent descriptions of myself as 'a mere writer of romances and boys’ books'". The book is named after Jess, one of the two orphaned nieces of a farmer in the Transvaal.

== Reception ==
The book was highly successful.

== Adaptations ==
The book was filmed in 1912, 1914, and 1917 (as Heart and Soul starring Theda Bara in the title role).
