= The Green-Eyed Monster (1916 film) =

1916 film by J. Gordon Edwards

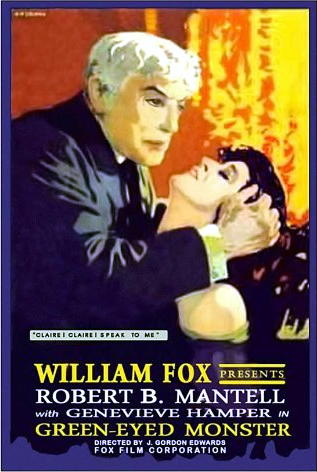
- Film poster
- Directed by: J. Gordon Edwards
- Written by: Mary Murillo
- Produced by: William Fox
- Starring: Robert B. Mantell
- Cinematography: Arthur Ripley; Phil Rosen
- Distributed by: Fox Film Corporation
- Release date: January 2, 1916
- Running time: 50 minutes
- Country: USA
- Language: Silent...English titles

The Green-Eyed Monster is a lost 1916 silent film drama. The film directed by J. Gordon Edwards and starred Robert B. Mantell.

== Cast ==
- Robert B. Mantell - Raimond de Mornay
- Genevieve Hamper - Claire
- Stuart Holmes - Louis de Mornay
- Pauline Barry - The Governess (*as Miss Barry)
- Henry Leone
- Charles Davidson
- Charles Crompton

== See also ==
- 1937 Fox vault fire
- The Green Eyed Monster (1919 film)
- The Green-Eyed Monster (2001 film)
