= The Blindness of Devotion =

- Directed by: J. Gordon Edwards; Clifford P. Saum (assistant director)
- Written by: J. Gordon Edwards
- Based on: a screen story by Rex Ingram
- Produced by: William Fox
- Starring: Robert B. Mantell; Genevieve Hamper
- Cinematography: Arthur D. Ripley; Phil Rosen
- Distributed by: Fox Film Corporation
- Release date: 1915
- Running time: 5 reels
- Country: United States
- Language: Silent (English intertitles)

The Blindness of Devotion is a lost 1915 silent film drama directed by J. Gordon Edwards and starring Robert B. Mantell and Genevieve Hamper. It was produced and distributed by Fox Film Corporation.

== Cast ==
- Robert B. Mantell - Count de Carnay
- Genevieve Hamper - Renee Delacroix
- Stuart Holmes - Pierre Caveraux
- Claire Whitney - Bella
- Henry Leone
- Charles Young
- Jack Standing

== See also ==
- 1937 Fox vault fire
