= Robert B. Mantell =

British actor

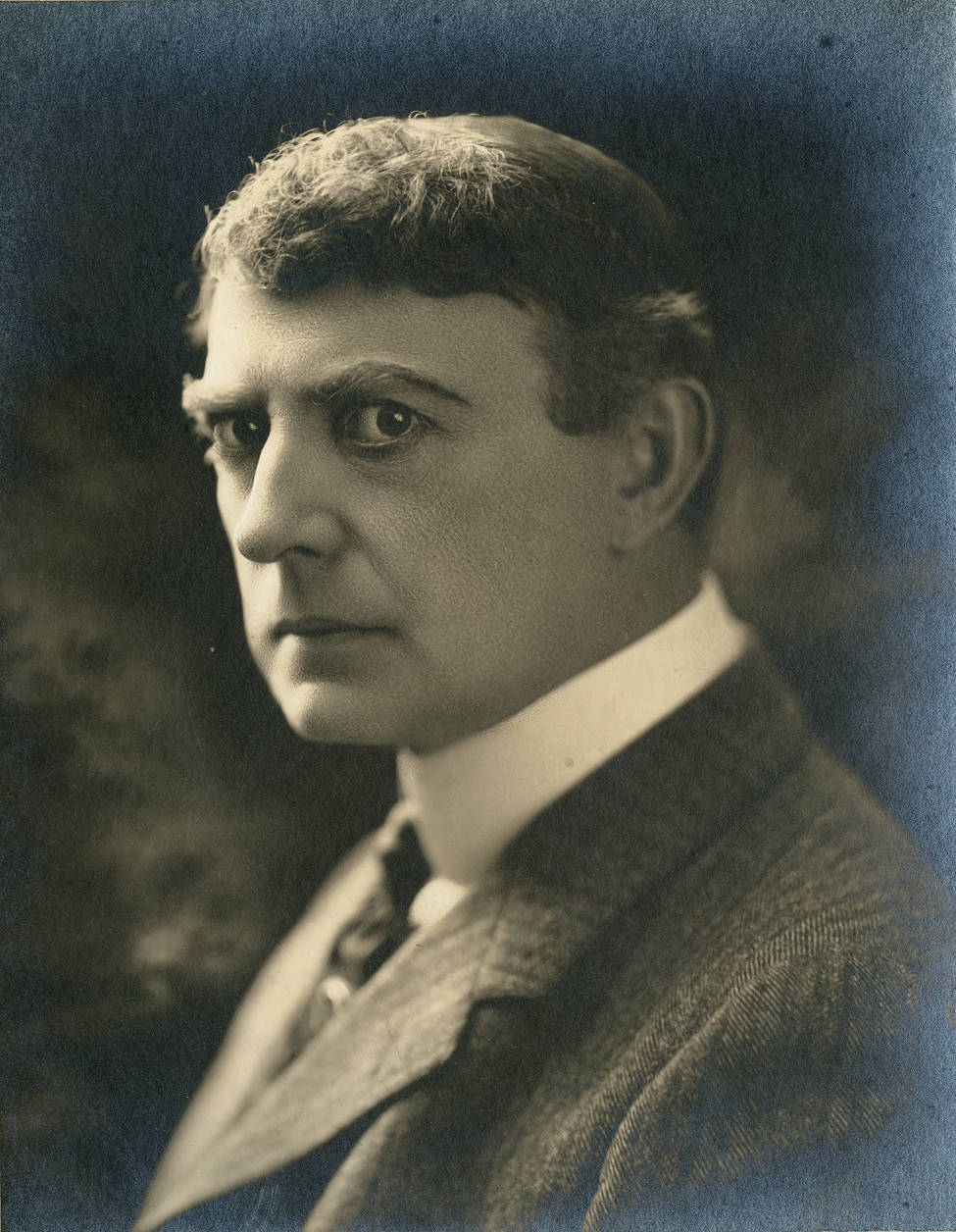
- Born: Robert Bruce Mantell; 7 February 1854; Irvine, North Ayrshire, Scotland
- Died: 27 June 1928 (aged 74); Atlantic Highlands, New Jersey, US
- Other name: Robert Hudson
- Occupation: Actor
- Years active: 1874–1928
- Spouses: Marie Sheldon; Charlotte Behrens; Marie Booth Russell; Genevieve Hamper
- Children: 3

Robert Bruce Mantell (7 February 1854 – 27 June 1928) was a Scottish-born stage actor who made several silent films. He used the name Robert Hudson early in his career, as his mother objected to her son becoming an actor.

Born in Scotland and raised in Belfast, he travelled to the United States in 1874, but stayed only two weeks with no theatrical success. He returned in 1878 in support of Helena Modjeska but did not stay. In 1883 he found success on Broadway supporting Fanny Davenport as her leading man in Fedora. For the remainder of his theatrical career he played Shakespeare and high class drama. He married several times, and often performed with his wives in Shakespearean productions. His last wife, Genevieve Hamper (1888–1971), was 35 years his junior.

He began acting in films in 1915, aged 61, working at Fox Studios with J. Gordon Edwards, who directed all of his films except the last. Under the Red Robe (1923) was directed by Alan Crosland and distributed through Goldwyn Pictures. As with most early Fox films, all of Mantell's films from that studio are lost. Elements of Under the Red Robe are held at George Eastman House in Rochester, New York.

== Early life ==
Robert Bruce Mantell was born on 7 February 1854 in Irvine, Scotland, the third child of James Mantell and his wife Elizabeth née Bruce. His mother could reportedly trace her lineage to Robert the Bruce. He was born at the Wheatsheaf Inn, which his parents owned and operated.

When "Bobbie", as he was known, was five years old, his parents sold the Wheatsheaf and moved to Belfast to take over management of a Hotel, which they named the Eglington-Winton, which is on the corner of Victoria Street and High Street Belfast, opposite the Albert Clock. He attended five different schools and was dismissed from each for disciplinary problems. It was not until he was enrolled at McClinton's Seminary that he finally obtained something of a formal education.

Robert Bruce Mantell was the great-uncle of Angela Lansbury.

== Career ==
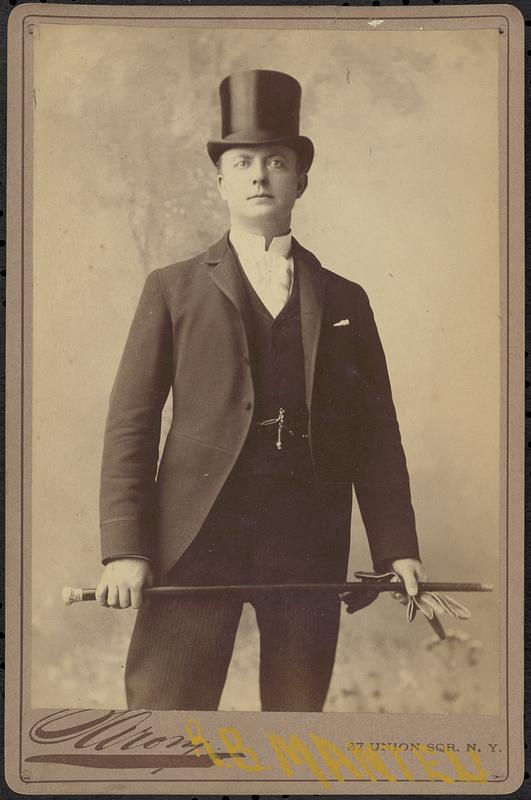
R. B. Mantell, ca. 1877-1895; from the Cabinet Card Collection of the Boston Public Library

In Dublin, according to Mantell's biographer Clarence J. Bulliet, "there was a dramatic club, which young Bob Mantell, semi-clandestinely, because of parental objections, was one of the burning tapers". While his mother approved of such amateur stage productions, she had a "horror of the professional stage". When he resolved to pursue a career on the stage, his mother refused to assist him until he swore to change his name to Robert Hudson, and to go to America to ply his craft.

With this assurance given, his mother presented Robert with "the same little sum of money she had given his older brothers when they started out into the world". However, after a mere 10 days in Boston, with no job and no prospects, Robert was down to exactly enough money to purchase a return ticket. He bought a ticket on the Hecla and returned home to Ireland. His first theatrical job (still using the name Robert Hudson) was with a stock company at the Theatre Royal, in Rochdale, Lancashire, where, on 21 October 1876, he made his stage debut in Dion Boucicault's Arrah-na-Pogue.

The company disbanded after one year, and Mantell joined the Heffernan company, performing abridged versions of Macbeth, Othello, Richard III and Hamlet that were "so hydraulically condensed that he could give ten or a dozen performances a day". He joined the company of Alice Marriott, and remained until 1878 when he set sail again for America. Using his real name for the first time, he won the part of Tybalt in the Leyland Opera House production of Romeo and Juliet.

There he joined George S. Knight's company, portraying Iago in Shakespeare's Othello opposite Frank Clement, who played the title character. In Knight's company he played several roles in Shakespeare's Romeo and Juliet, Hamlet, and Macbeth. In 1883 he again headed to America. His first leading role in America was as Sir Clement Huntingford in The World. He attained critical and popular acclaim in the role of Loris Ipanoff in Fanny Davenport's 1883–84 production of Fedora. After that, leading roles came quickly and steadily.

He starred in John Keller's Tangled Lives in 1886, starred in The Marble Heart in 1887, and in Monbars in 1887–88. By 1890, "MantQell believed himself strong enough to venture on a tour on his own account, after the fashion of the English actor-managers and pocket all the profits". In 1892, he opened at New York's Proctors Theatre in Charles Osborne's The Face in the Moonlight, with Caroline Miskel, a young actress who was just at the beginning of her brief career on Broadway.

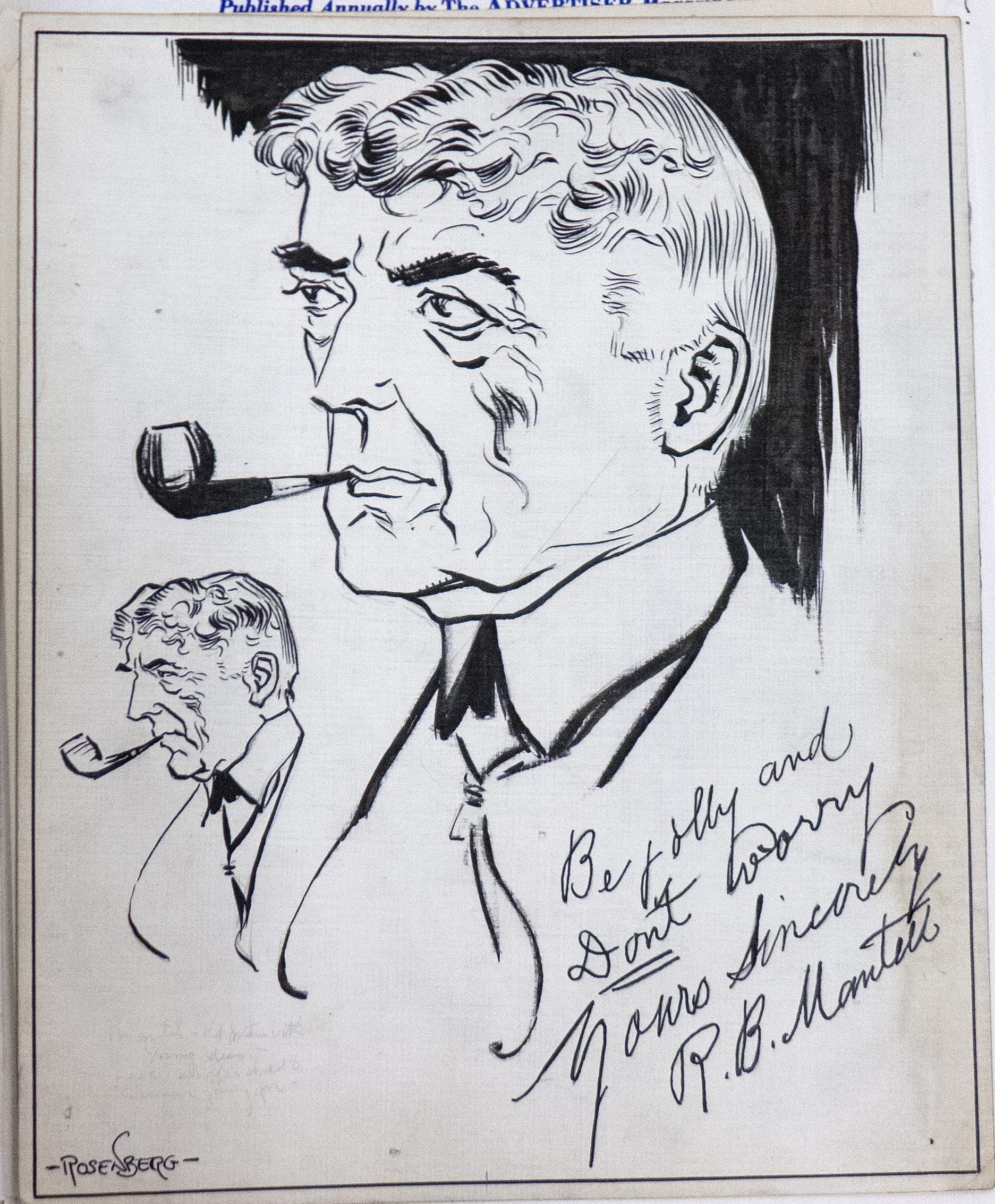
Robert Mantell autographed drawing by Manuel Rosenberg for the Cincinnati Post, 1928

In the last 5 years of the 19th century he toured extensively, putting on performances of Monbars, Othello, Hamlet and The Corsican Brothers in town after town, state after state—everywhere but New York. When the lawyers finally resolved his alimony difficulties, Mantell – now significantly older – returned to New York, but not as a romantic lead, as he had been known for so many years, but as a classic tragedian. One of his first leading roles after his return to New York was as Richard III, where he demonstrated that "the line of great tragedians on the American stage had not ended with Edwin Booth". Work came easily after that. At one point, he was starring in Richard III one week, Richelieu the second week, Othello the third week, and Hamlet the fourth week in rotation.

Mantell played Cawdor in Macbeth many times over, but King Lear was by far his "masterwork". He played the role over and over, refining and perfecting it from the 1910s almost until his death.

Robert B. Mantell died at his home in Atlantic Highlands, New Jersey on 27 June 1928.

== Filmography ==
- Select Scenes from Monbars (1896 short film)
- The Blindness of Devotion (1915)
- The Unfaithful Wife (1915)
- The Green-Eyed Monster (1916)
- A Wife's Sacrifice (1916)
- The Spider and the Fly (1916)
- Tangled Lives (1917)
- Under the Red Robe (1923)

== Personal life ==
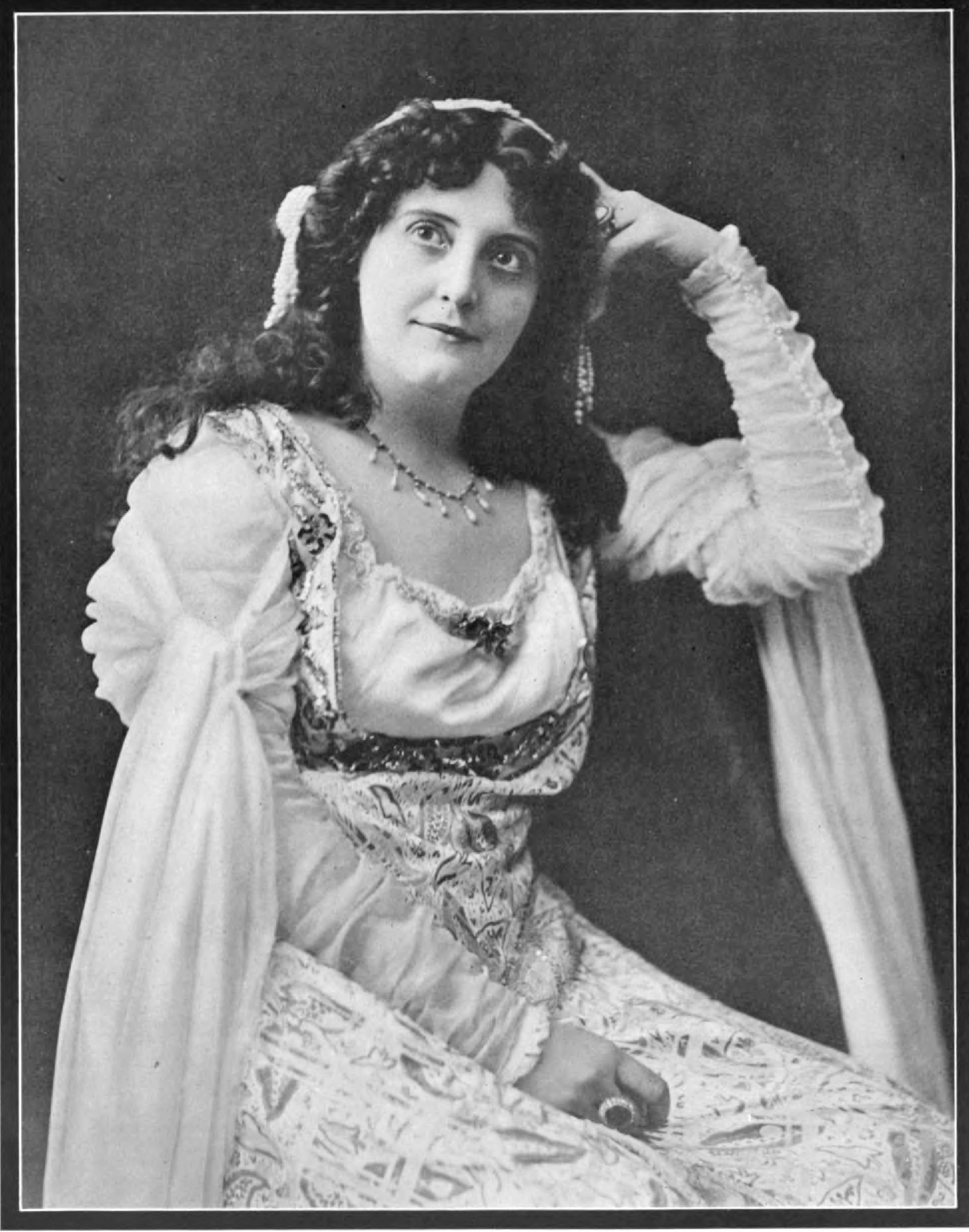
Marie Booth Russell in 1909 as Juliet

Mantell was known for having had several marriages, and often performed with his wives in Shakespearean productions. He married Marie Sheldon, who bore him two sons, Robert Shand and Jack Mantell, but the couple soon divorced. Alimony demands and arrest warrants for nonsupport kept Mantell out of New York for years. He subsequently married Charlotte Behrens who bore him a daughter, Ethel Mantell, in 1895. His third wife was Marie Booth Russell who had a child from a previous relationship and who died in 1911. His last wife, Genevieve Hamper (1888–1971), was 35 years his junior, and bore him a son, Robert Bruce Mantell Jr. (1912–1933). He was close friends with professional wrestler Dutch Mantell, who took on Robert's last name as his stage name (his real last name was too difficult to pronounce).
