= The Orphan (1920 film) =

1920 Western directed by J. Gordon Edwards

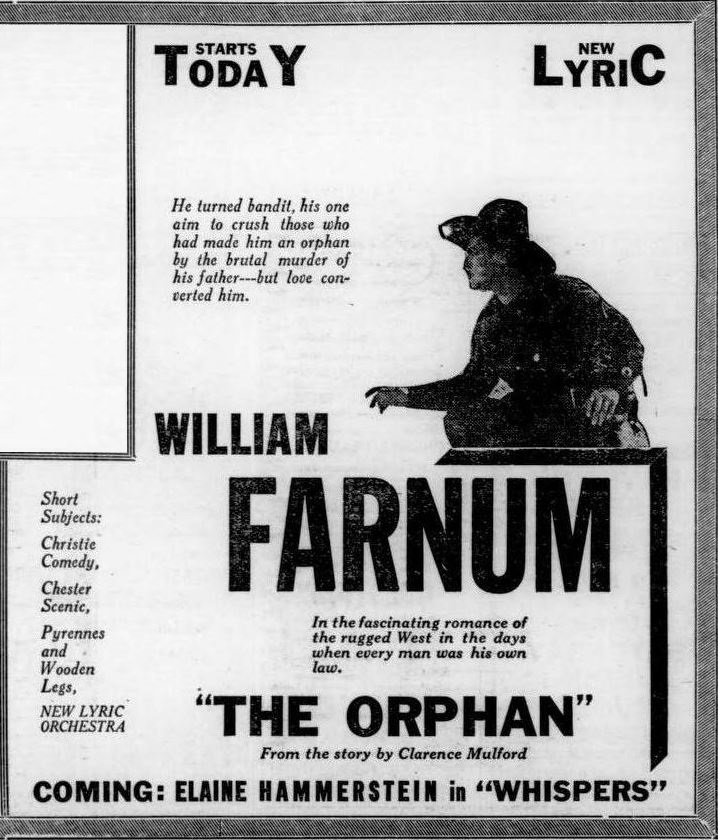
- Newspaper advertisement.
- Directed by: J. Gordon Edwards
- Screenplay by: Clarence E. Mulford; Roy Somerville
- Based on: The Orphan by Clarence E. Mulford
- Starring: William Farnum; Louise Lovely; Henry Herbert; G. Raymond Nye
- Cinematography: John W. Boyle
- Release date: 1920
- Running time: 60 minutes
- Country: United States
- Language: English

The Orphan is a 1920 silent Western film directed by J. Gordon Edwards and starred William Farnum, Louise Lovely, Henry Herbert, and G. Raymond Nye. The film was produced by William Fox and distributed by Fox Film .

The film, now presumably lost, had 6 reels (i.e. it lasted approximately 60 minutes) and was released in May 1920. Contemporary reception was positive, reviewers praising the fight scenes and Farnum's performance.

== Synopsis ==
The film centers upon The Orphan, a man who became an outlaw terrorizing the town of Ford's Station after watching his father's brutal murder as a young boy. His behavior puts him at odds with Sheriff Jim Shields, however the two men become unlikely friends when The Orphan rescues him from Apache Indians. The Orphan comes to Jim's aid once again after the Indians attack a stagecoach containing his two sisters and niece Helen. He becomes immediately smitten with Helen, even braving a trip into town to visit with her.

However even as Helen becomes a positive influence, many still believe the worst of The Orphan and believe him to have shot another man over a game of cards. Several ranchers, led by Tex Willard, head of the Bar 8 Ranch, form a lynch mob and capture another of The Orphan's friends, Bill Howland. Jim arrives to stop Willard and his crew just as they are about to hang Bill for refusing to divulge The Orphan's location. Tex manages to get the upper hand on Jim, only for The Orphan to arrive and once again save his friends. He recognizes Willard as the man who killed his father, resulting in a gun duel. In the end, The Orphan settles down with Helen for a peaceful life.

== Cast ==
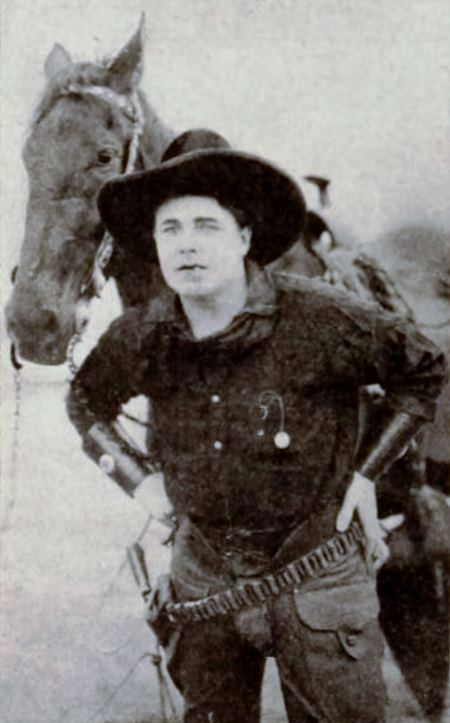
Farnum in the film (still, reproduced in May 15, 1920 issue of the Exhibitors Herald)

- William Farnum as The Orphan
- Louise Lovely as Helen Shields
- Henry Herbert as Tex Willard
- George Nichols as Sheriff Jim Shields
- G. Raymond Nye as Bill Howland
- Earl Crain as Bucknel
- Francis Carpenter as Young Orphan
- Olive White

== Production ==
The film adapts the 1908 Hopalong Cassidy novel of the same name by Clarence E. Mulford and plans for the film were announced as early as August 1919. William Farnum was brought on to portray the titular orphan and he starred alongside Louise Lovely, a frequent co-star. The film also starred Francis Carpenter, who portrayed a younger version of Farnum's character. The Orphan marked the thirtieth of many films Farnum made with William Fox.

Filming took place in Palm Springs, California and The Akron Beacon Journal noted that a buzzard began circling overhead during the gun duel scene between Farnam and Willard. It landed after Nichols feigned being shot, but flew away after it realized that the actor was still alive. The Fort Worth Record-Telegram also covered The Orphan's production, stating that the movie filmed parts of the countryside that were not normally seen in cinema and that it used "many unusual long shots, odd angles and quick gunplay."

== Release and preservation status ==
The Orphan was released to theaters in the United States during May 1920. With no known surviving prints located in any film archives, The Orphan is considered a lost film.

== Reception ==
The American Film Institute cites 6 contemporary reviews of the film. A critic for Variety reviewed The Orphan, writing that the film was an example of westerns that "hand out film food to a grown-up audience".

A review in The Muncie Evening Press praised Farnum's acting and physical presence. The Reno Gazette-Journal was also positive about the fight scenes, indicating that the actor "like(d) them immensely". Other contemporary reviews shared the enthusiasm, with The Connectitut Labor News writing that it was "the most powerful role of [Farnum's] career." The Seattle Union Record, however, was of the opposite opinion and wrote that the film "did not surpass anything he ha(d) previously done."
