= Madame Du Barry (1917 film) =

1917 film directed by J. Gordon Edwards

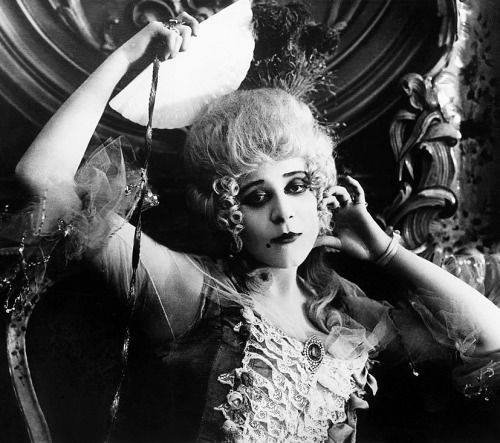
- Still with Theda Bara
- Directed by: J. Gordon Edwards
- Written by: Adrian Johnson
- Based on: Memoirs d’un médecin 1848 novel by Alexandre Dumas
- Produced by: Fox Film Corporation
- Starring: Theda Bara; Charles Clary
- Cinematography: John W. Boyle; Rial Schellinger
- Distributed by: Fox Film Corporation
- Release date: December 30, 1917
- Running time: 7 reels
- Country: United States
- Language: Silent (English intertitles)

Madame Du Barry or Du Barry is a 1917 American silent historical drama film directed by J. Gordon Edwards and starring Theda Bara. The film is based on the French novel Memoirs d’un médecin by Alexandre Dumas.

== Plot ==
As described in a film magazine, Madame Jeanne Du Barry (Bara) becomes the reigning favorite of Louis XV (Clary) and enjoys this distinction until the sudden death of the king. The lavish mode of living by the king and Jeanne Du Barry arouse the wrath of the peasant class, and after the death of the king a revolution breaks out. Jeanne is made to suffer through the revolution and pays the ultimate price on the guillotine.

== Cast ==
- Theda Bara as Madame Du Barry
- Charles Clary as Louis XV
- Fred Church as Cossé-Brissac
- Herschel Mayall as Jean DuBarry
- Genevieve Blinn as Duchess deGaumont
- Willard Louis as Guillaume DuBarry
- Hector Sarno as Lebel
- Dorothy Drake as Henriette
- Rosita Marstini as Mother Savord
- Joe King

== Reception ==
Like many American films of the time, Madame Du Barry was subject to cuts by city and state film censorship boards. The Chicago Board of Censors required a cut of Madame Du Barry lying on the guillotine and the closeup of the blade.

== Preservation status ==
This film is now considered to be a lost film. Many of Theda Bara's films were destroyed in the 1937 Fox Studios vault fire.

== See also ==
- List of lost films
- 1937 Fox vault fire
