= A Wife's Sacrifice =

1916 film by J. Gordon Edwards

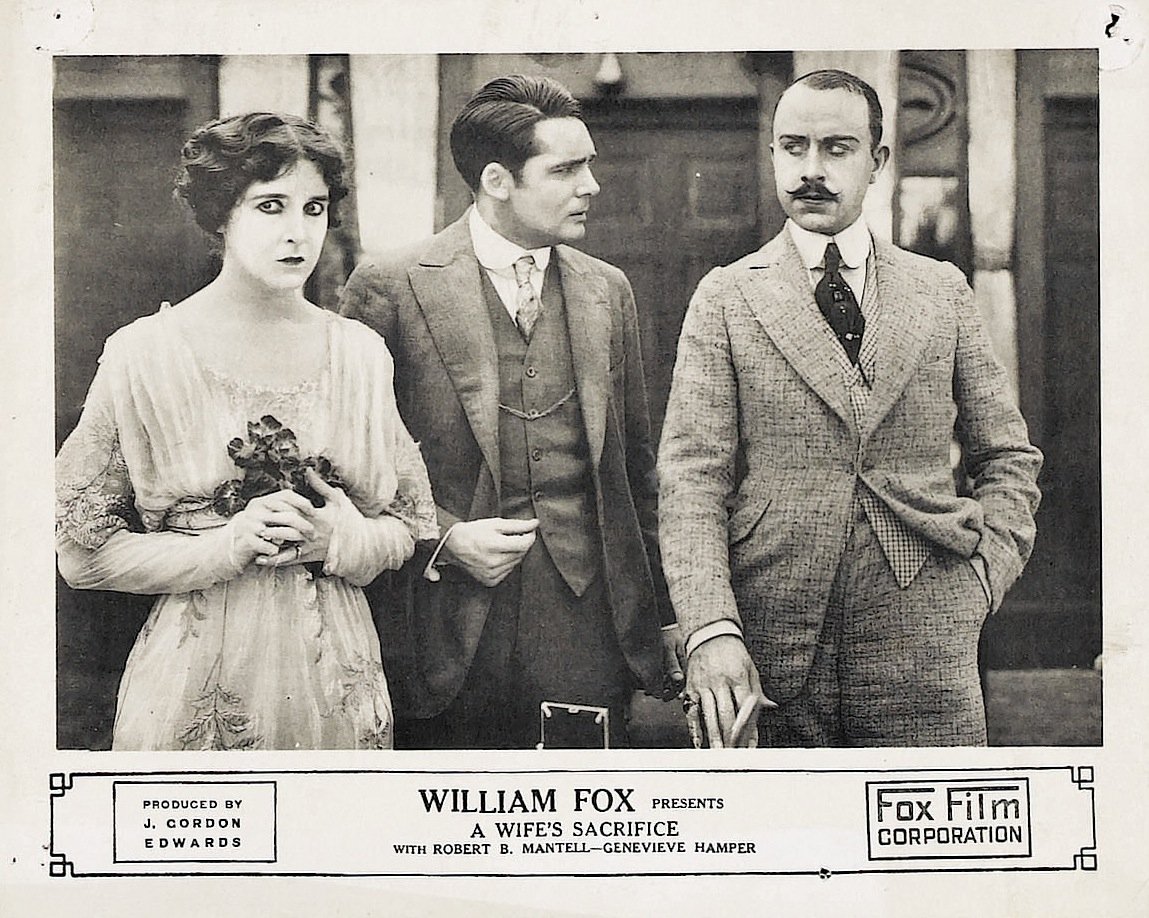
- Lobby card for the film. Left to Right: Genevieve Hamper, Walter Miller, Stuart Holmes
- Directed by: J. Gordon Edwards
- Written by: J. Gordon Edwards
- Produced by: William Fox
- Starring: Robert B. Mantell; Genevieve Hamper
- Cinematography: Phil Rosen
- Distributed by: Fox Film Corporation
- Release date: March 27, 1916
- Running time: 5 reels
- Country: United States
- Language: Silent (English intertitles)

A Wife's Sacrifice is a lost 1916 American silent drama film directed by J. Gordon Edwards and produced and distributed by Fox Film Corporation.

== Cast ==
- Robert B. Mantell as Count de Moray
- Genevieve Blinn as Countess de Moray
- Claire Whitney as Pauline de Moray
- Louise Rial as Madam de la Marche
- Henry Leone as Maltia
- Genevieve Hamper as Gorgone
- Stuart Holmes as Peppo
- Walter Miller as Elliott Drake
- Walter McCollough as Robert Burel
- Jane Lee as Marie Magnetti
- William Gerald as Muller, Jeweler
- Franklin B. Coates as Valier, Consul at Calcutta

== See also ==
- List of Fox Film films
- 1937 Fox vault fire
