= A Woman There Was =

1919 film by J. Gordon Edwards

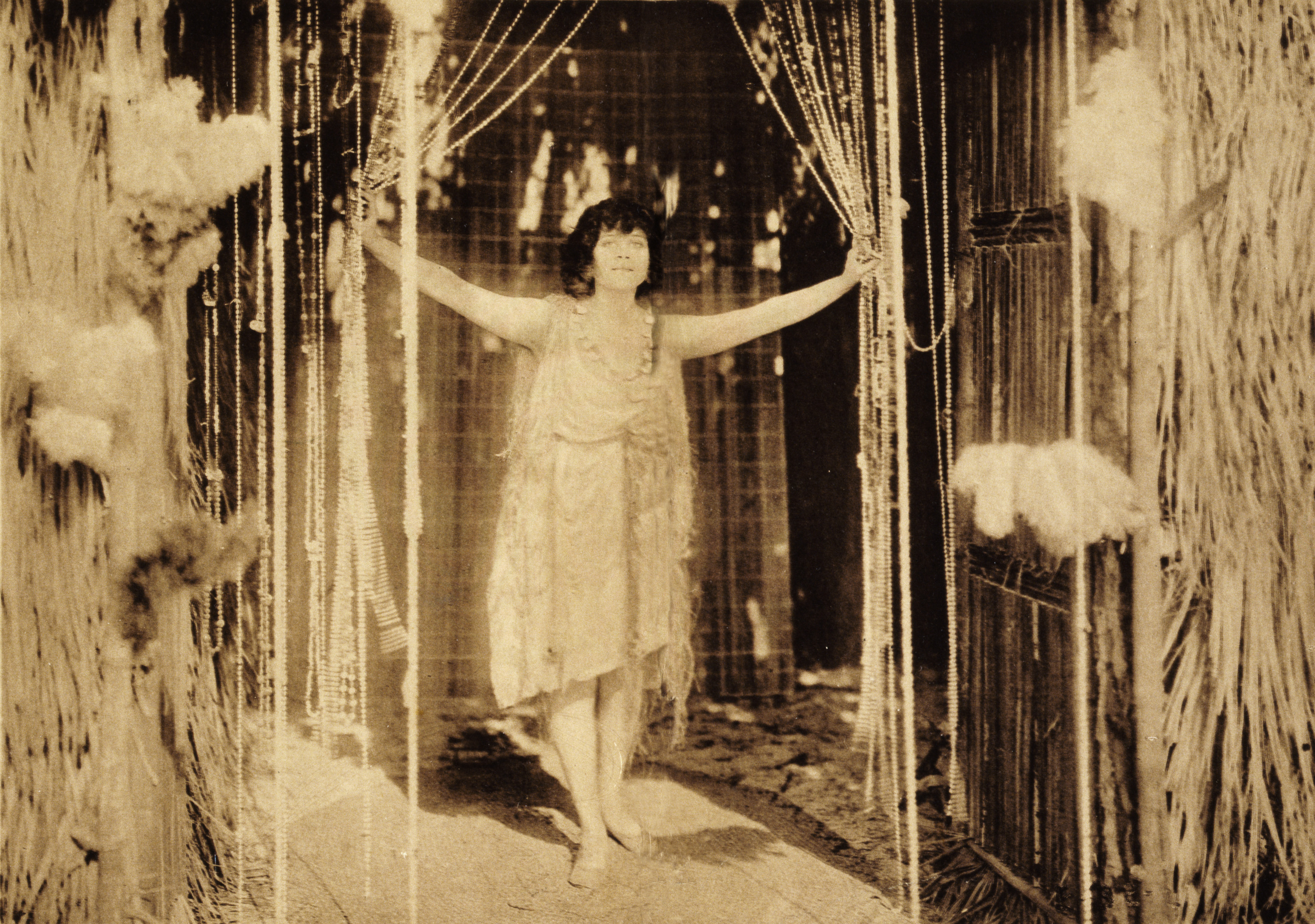
- Lobby card for the film
- Directed by: J. Gordon Edwards
- Written by: Adrian Johnson (scenario)
- Based on: "Creation's Tears" by George James Hopkins
- Starring: Theda Bara
- Cinematography: John W. Boyle
- Distributed by: Fox Film Corporation
- Release date: June 1, 1919
- Running time: 50 minutes
- Country: United States
- Language: Silent (English intertitles)

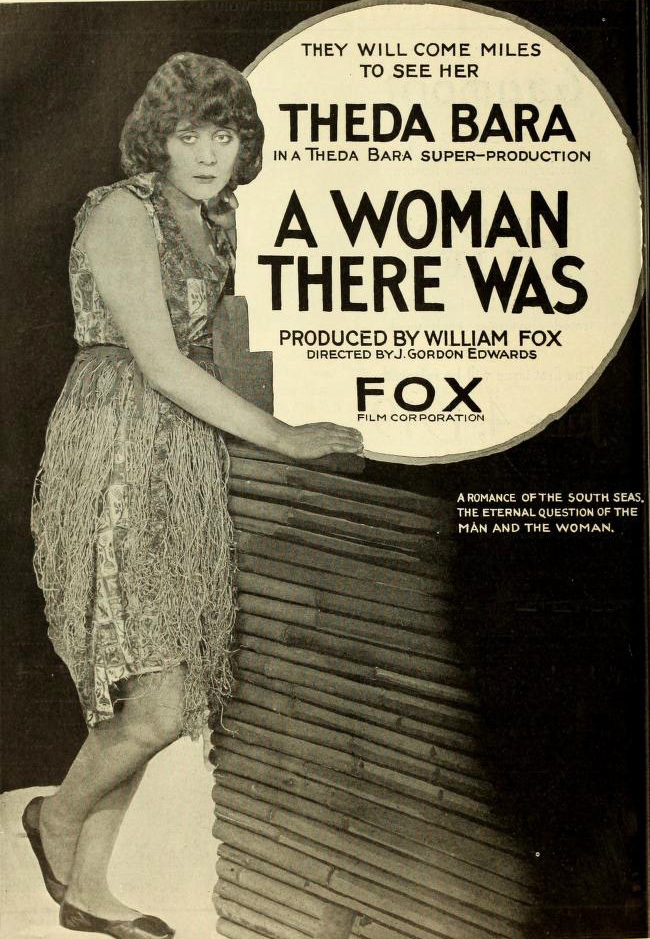
Advertisement (1919)

A Woman There Was is a 1919 American silent South Seas drama film directed by J. Gordon Edwards and starring Theda Bara. The film is based on the short story "Creation's Tears", by George James Hopkins (under the name "Neje Hopkins"). Bara portrays Zara, the daughter of a South Seas island tribal chief, who falls in love with a missionary and is killed after helping him escape.

== Plot ==
As described in a film magazine, Zara (Bara), daughter of tribal chief Majah (Ardizoni), is beloved by Pulke (Elliott), a pearl diver. When New England missionary Winthrop Stark (Davidson) arrives, Zara has no time for Pulke but offers her love to Stark, who refuses her as he expects to wed a girl back home. Pulke, jealous of the missionary, attempts to kill him with a spear, but Zara shields him at risk to her life. When a typhoon hits, the natives decides to offer Stark as a sacrifice to appease the gods, but again Zara saves him by offering herself in his place. She plunges into the ocean but is saved by the missionary before she drowns. As a result of his exertions, Stark lingers near death. Zara steals the sacred black pearl from the tomb of her father, who died during the storm, and with it Stark recovers. The natives stab Zara for taking the pearl, and once more she saves Stark, though dying herself, by returning the black pearl as payment for his safety.

== Cast ==
- Theda Bara as Princess Zara
- William B. Davidson as Reverend Winthrop Stark
- Robert Elliott as Pulke
- Claude Payton as High Priest
- John Ardizoni as Majah

== Production ==
A Woman There Was was filmed in Miami Beach, Florida, which at that time was often used as a substitute locale in South Seas films.

== Reception ==
Compared to her earlier films, A Woman There Was was a commercial flop. Prior Fox films had typecast Bara as a vamp, and the public would not accept Bara in a non-vamp role in films such as A Woman There Was.

== Preservation status ==
The studio prints of Bara's films were destroyed along with the rest of Fox's silent films in the 1937 Fox vault fire. With no copies of the film in any private collections or archives, A Woman There Was is now considered to be a lost film.

== See also ==
- List of lost films
- 1937 Fox vault fire
