= The Unfaithful Wife (1915 film) =

1916 American film

- Directed by: J. Gordon Edwards
- Based on: Vendetta! by Marie Corelli
- Starring: Robert B. Mantell; Genevieve Hamper; Stuart Holmes; Warner Oland
- Cinematography: Phil Rosen
- Release date: 1915
- Country: United States
- Language: English

The Unfaithful Wife is a 1915 silent horror drama film directed by J. Gordon Edwards and starred Robert B. Mantell, Genevieve Hamper, Stuart Holmes, and Warner Oland. The film was produced by William Fox and distributed by Fox Film. The film, today believed to be lost, was a revenge drama set in Italy that received praise for the actors’ performances and for Phil Rosen’s cinematography.

The film was released in Canada in 1917 as The Living Death.

== Cast ==
- Robert B. Mantell as Count Fabiano Romani
- Genevieve Hamper as Juliet Romani
- Stuart Holmes as Arturo Durazzi
- Warner Oland in an undetermined secondary role

== Preservation status and plot ==
The film is considered lost. But contemporary sources, including the 25 December 1915 issue of Motography, allow to know the plot.

=== Summary ===
Set in Italy, the film followed Count Fabiano Romani, an Italian nobleman who discovers that his wife, Juliet Romani, is engaged in a clandestine affair with Arturo Durazzi. Shortly after this discovery, the Count is stricken with a sudden illness that bears the symptoms of cholera. The guilty lovers—anxious to rid themselves of the husband—hasten his burial in the family vault while he is still alive. The Count eventually regains consciousness within the tomb and manages to escape, to seek vengeance.

== Production ==
The film is an adaptation of a novel called Vendetta!. The Motion Picture News noted that the film used a camera capable of picking up heartbeats and that the movie would be the first to use it to record human respiration. The film's chief camera man, Phil Rosen, stated that they made this work by using "ingenuity and by the proper arrangement of lights".

== Release ==
The Unfaithful Wife faced some issues from censors in Ohio, who objected to scenes of Count Romani discovering that he was buried alive and for him killing his wife's lover. The film was released to theaters in the United States on December 5, 1915. It received an additional release in Canada during 1917, where it was retitled as The Living Death.

== Reception ==
Per the American Film Institute, critical reception for The Unfaithful Wife was mixed. Common elements of praise centered upon the acting of Mantell and Hamper, while criticism was levied towards the film's "persistent themes of murder, revenge, and especially cholera". Oscar Cooper reviewed the film for Motion Picture News, writing that the plot "gains and keeps the interest because it is developed logically, and because the players chosen to present it are convincing." Freddie Film of The Seattle Star also reviewed the movie, calling it ”purely drama” and praising the acting.

Modern critics have commented upon the lost film. Authors Soister et al. consider the film as belonging to the genre of horror, while Vanda Kreft feels that the film was representative of William Fox's insistence on graphic depictions of death scenes during the time the film was made.

== Links ==
The Unfaithful Wife at IMDb
