= Wolves of the Night =

1919 film by J. Gordon Edwards

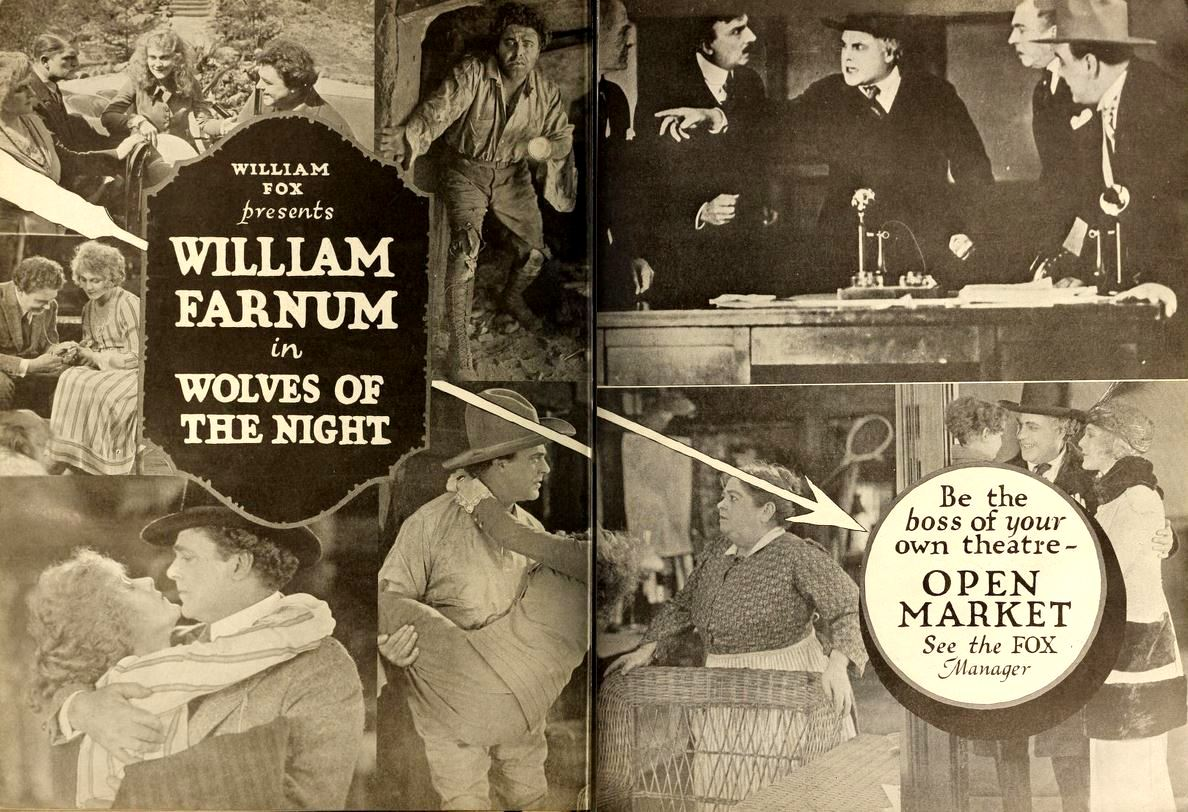
- Advertisement
- Directed by: J. Gordon Edwards
- Written by: E. Lloyd Sheldon
- Produced by: William Fox
- Starring: William Farnum; Louise Lovely; Lamar Johnstone
- Production company: Fox Film
- Distributed by: Fox Film
- Release date: August 10, 1919
- Running time: 5 reels
- Country: United States
- Language: Silent (English intertitles)

Wolves of the Night is a 1919 American silent drama film directed by J. Gordon Edwards and starring William Farnum, Louise Lovely, and Lamar Johnstone.

== Cast ==
- William Farnum as Bruce Andrews
- Louise Lovely as Isabel Hollins
- Lamar Johnstone as Burton Mortimer
- Charles Clary as Edmund Rawn
- Al Fremont as Garson
- G. Raymond Nye as Slade
- Carrie Clark Ward as Mrs. Benson
- Irene Rich as Juanita

== Preservation ==
The film is now lost.

== Bibliography ==
- Solomon, Aubrey. The Fox Film Corporation, 1915-1935: A History and Filmography. McFarland, 2011.
