= Her Greatest Love =

1917 film directed by J. Gordon Edwards

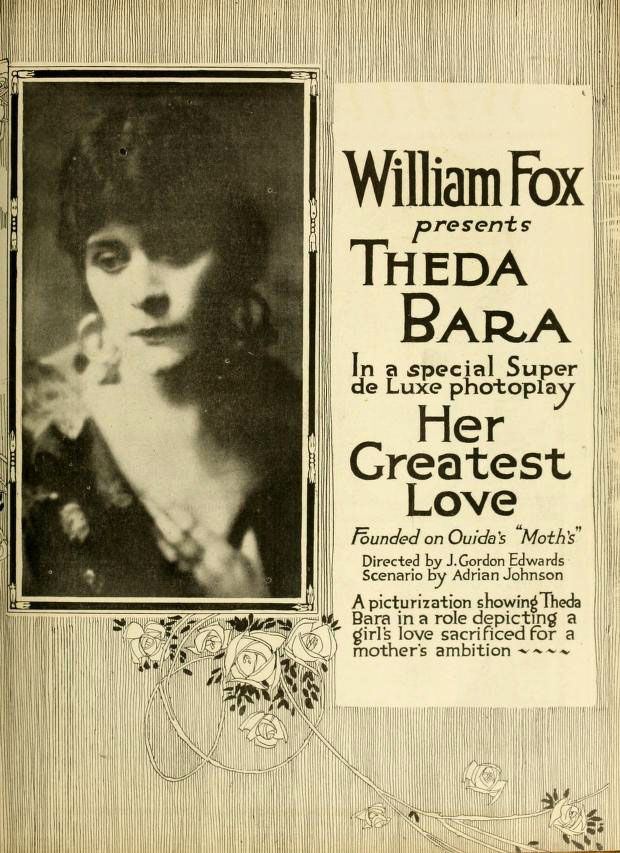
- Film poster
- Directed by: J. Gordon Edwards
- Written by: Adrian Johnson (scenario)
- Based on: Moths by Ouida
- Produced by: William Fox
- Starring: Theda Bara; Walter Law
- Cinematography: Phil Rosen
- Distributed by: Fox Film Corporation
- Release date: April 2, 1917
- Running time: 5 reels
- Country: United States
- Languages: Silent; English intertitles

Her Greatest Love is a 1917 American silent drama film directed by J. Gordon Edwards, starring Theda Bara, and based on the 1880 novel Moths by Ouida. This film is now considered to be lost.

== Cast ==
- Theda Bara as Hazel
- Marie Curtis as Lady Dolly
- Walter Law as Prince Zuoroff
- Glen White as Lord Jura
- Harry Hilliard as Lucies Coresze
- Callie Torres as Jeanne De Sonnaz
- Alice Gale as Nurse
- Grace Saum as Maid

== See also ==
- List of lost films
- 1937 Fox vault fire
