= The Song of Hate =

1915 film directed by J. Gordon Edwards

- Directed by: J. Gordon Edwards
- Written by: Rex Ingram (scenario)
- Based on: Tosca by Giacomo Puccini; from the play La Tosca by Victorien Sardou
- Produced by: William Fox
- Starring: Betty Nansen
- Distributed by: Fox Film Corporation
- Release date: September 1915
- Running time: 6 reels
- Country: USA
- Language: Silent...English titles

The Song of Hate is a lost 1915 silent film drama directed by J. Gordon Edwards and starring Betty Nansen. It was produced and distributed by Fox Film Corporation. Rex Ingram wrote the script.

== Cast ==
- Betty Nansen – Floria Tosca
- Arthur Hoops – Baron Scarpia
- Dorothy Bernard – The spy's lover
- Claire Whitney – The spy's sister

== See also ==
- 1937 Fox vault fire
- La Tosca (1918 film)
