= Tangled Lives (1917 film) =

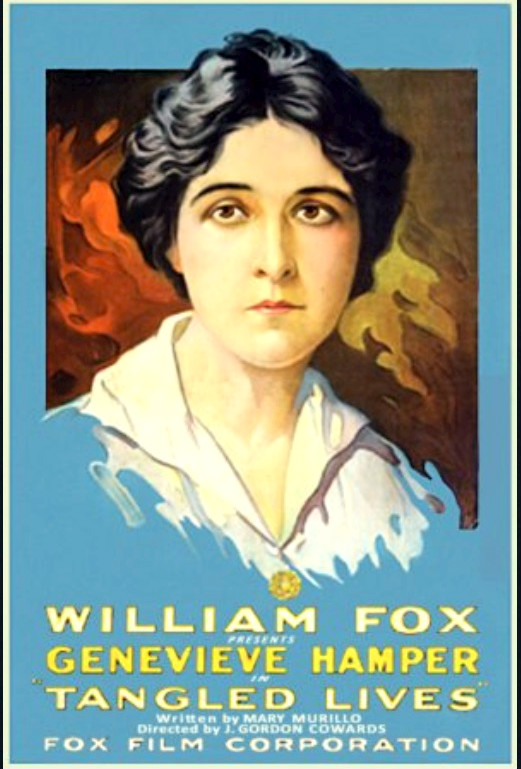
- Film poster
- Directed by: J. Gordon Edwards
- Written by: Mary Murillo (adaptation & scenario)
- Based on: The Woman in White; 1860 novel by Wilkie Collins
- Produced by: William Fox
- Starring: Genevieve Hamper; Robert B. Mantell
- Cinematography: Phil Rosen
- Distributed by: Fox Film Corporation
- Release date: April 2, 1917
- Running time: 5 reels
- Country: United States
- Language: Silent (English intertitles)

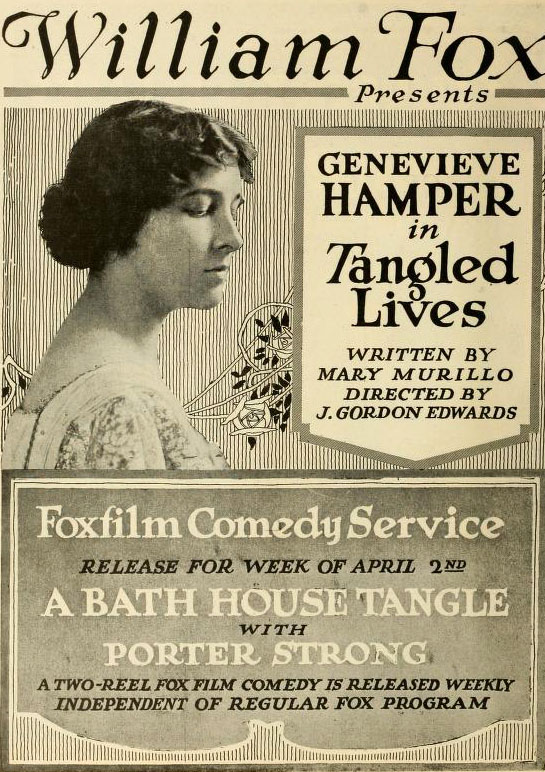
period advertisement.

Tangled Lives is a 1917 American silent drama film produced and distributed by the Fox Film Corporation. The film was directed by J. Gordon Edwards and starred husband and wife stage actors Genevieve Hamper and Robert B. Mantell.

This film is a version of the 1860 Wilkie Collins novel The Woman in White. Several versions of this novel have been produced over the years, one in 1912, two in 1917 including this film, a 1929 silent, and a remake in 1948.

== Cast ==
- Genevieve Hamper as Laura Fairlie / Ann Catherick
- Stuart Holmes as Roly Schuyler
- Robert B. Mantell as Dassori
- Walter Miller as Walter Hartwright
- Henry Leone as Pesca
- Claire Whitney as Marion Halcombe
- Genevieve Blinn as Countess Dassori
- Louise Rial
- Millie Liston (billed as Millicent Liston)
- William Gerald
- Hal De Forrest
- Jane Lee (billed as Little Janey Lee)

== Preservation status ==
This film is now considered a lost film.

== See also ==
- List of lost films
- List of Fox Film films
- 1937 Fox vault fire
