= The Light (1919 film) =

1919 silent drama film

- Directed by: J.Gordon Edwards
- Screenplay by: Luther Reed Brett Page Adrian Johnson
- Starring: Theda Bara Robert Walker Eugene Ormonde
- Distributed by: Fox Film Cooperation
- Release date: January 12, 1919
- Running time: 50 mins. (5 reels)
- Country: United States
- Languages: Silent (English intertitles)

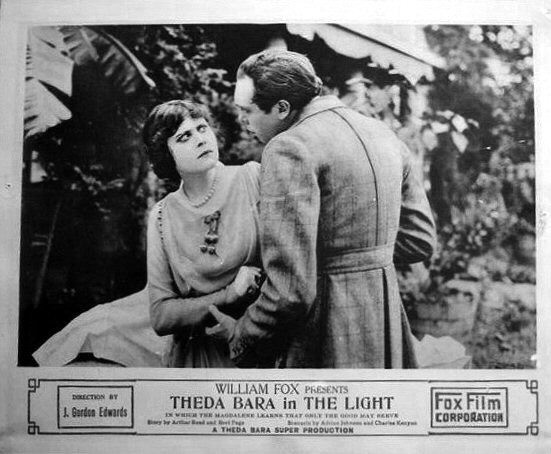
Lobby Card

The Light is a 1919 silent drama film directed by J. Gordon Edwards, and produced by William Fox. The film starred Theda Bara, Eugene Ormonde and Robert Walker

== Plot ==
Blanchette Dumonde is known as "the wickedest woman in Paris" because she cavorts with her wealthy lover Chabin rather than join in the war effort. When she meets sculptor Etienne Desechette, he requests that she pose for him because he is haunted by the great soul that he sees hidden in her face. Although Chabin angrily refuses for her, Blanchette, moved by Etienne's words, attempts to become a nurse, but is rebuked by a hospital authority. Furious, she goes with Chabin to an Apache club, where she flirts with Auchat, the roughest of the dancers, and takes him home when the den is raided. After Chabin finds them and fights Auchat, Blanchette sees Etienne returning from the war, blind. She takes him to a country cottage where she nurses him and poses as he sculpts her image by touch. When Auchat comes to kill Etienne, Blanchette kills Auchat. Chabin arrives and, seeing Blanchette's happiness, tells the police that he killed Auchat, who was attempting to rob the house.

== Cast ==
- Theda Bara as Clanchette Dumonde
- Eugene Ormonde as Chabin
- Robert Walker as Etienne Desechette
- George Renevant as Auchat
- Florence Martin as Jeanette

== Reception ==
Variety said that the film "is a fairly good type of a Bara "vamp" production.

== Preservation Status ==
The film is considered lost. This film, like many of Theda Bara's films, was destroyed in the 1937 Fox vault fire.
