= E. Lloyd Sheldon =

American screenwriter

- Born: May 27, 1886; Springfield, Massachusetts, U.S.
- Died: January 24, 1957 (aged 70); Los Angeles, California, U.S.
- Occupations: Screenwriter; film producer; film editor
- Years active: 1916–42

E. Lloyd Sheldon (May 27, 1886 – January 24, 1957) was an American screenwriter, film producer, and film editor. He wrote for more than 40 films from 1916 to 1942. He also produced 19 films from 1927 to 1939. He was born in Springfield, Massachusetts, and died in Los Angeles.

== Selected filmography ==
- The Weakness of Man (1916)
- A Branded Soul (1917)
- The Honeymoon (1917)
- The Forbidden Path (1918)
- The Moral Law (1918)
- Other Men's Daughters (1918)
- When a Woman Sins (1918)
- Marriage for Convenience (1919)
- Wolves of the Night (1919)
- Married in Haste (1919)
- The White Moll (1920)
- Bride 13 (1920)
- Sisters (1922)
- The Half-Way Girl (1925)
- Flaming Waters (1925)
- Aloma of the South Seas (1926)
- You'd Be Surprised (1926)
- Hotel Imperial (1927)
- It (1927)
- Children of Divorce (1927)
- Underworld (1927)
- Ladies of the Mob (1928)
- Sins of the Fathers (1928)
- City Streets (1931)
- Death Takes a Holiday (1934)
- The Last Outpost (1935)
- Hands Across the Table (1935)
- The Milky Way (1936)
