= Heart and Soul (1917 film) =

1917 film directed by J. Gordon Edwards

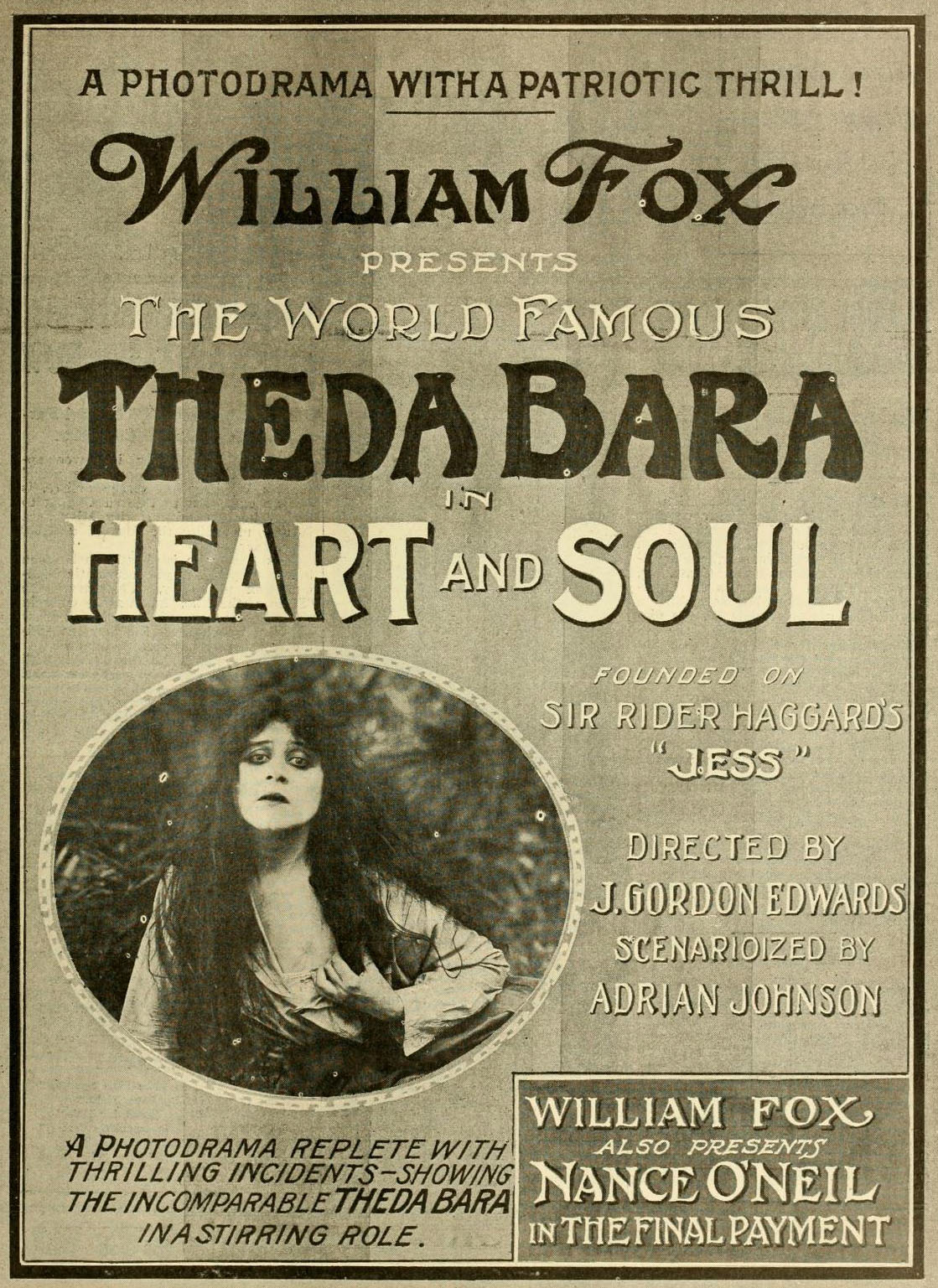
- Heart and Soul, also being shown with Youth's Endearing Charm.
- Directed by: J. Gordon Edwards
- Written by: Adrian Johnson
- Based on: Jess by H. Rider Haggard
- Produced by: William Fox
- Starring: Theda Bara; Claire Whitney
- Cinematography: Philip E. Rosen
- Distributed by: Fox Film Corporation
- Release date: May 21, 1917
- Running time: 5 reels
- Country: United States
- Language: Silent (English intertitles)

Heart and Soul is a 1917 American silent drama film directed by J. Gordon Edwards and starring Theda Bara. The film was based on the 1887 novel Jess by H. Rider Haggard and shot at the Fox Studio in Fort Lee, New Jersey. This film is now considered a lost film.

== Cast ==
- Theda Bara as Jess
- Edwin Holt as John Croft
- Claire Whitney as Bess
- Walter Law as Drummond
- Harry Hilliard as John Neil
- Glen White as Pedro
- Alice Gale as Mammy
- John Webb Dillion as Sancho
- Margaret Laird
- Kittens Reichert as Bess (in prologue)
- Margaret Lairce as Jess (in prologue)
- Art Acord as Undetermined Role (uncredited)

== See also ==
- List of lost films
- 1937 Fox vault fire
