= Wings of the Morning (1919 film) =

1919 film by J. Gordon Edwards

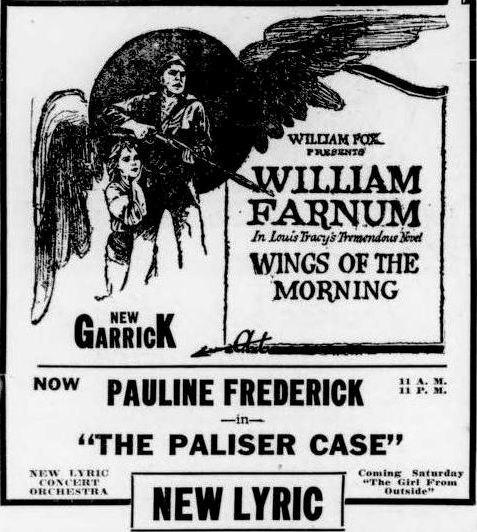
- Advertising of Wings of the Morning on page 11 of the Duluth Herald (April 8, 1920).
- Directed by: J. Gordon Edwards
- Written by: Charles Kenyon (scenario)
- Based on: The Wings of the Morning by Louis Tracy
- Produced by: William Fox
- Starring: William Farnum; Herschel Mayall; Frank Elliott; G. Raymond Nye; Clarence Burton; Harry De Vere
- Cinematography: John W. Boyle
- Music by: W.C. Polla
- Production company: Fox Film Corporation
- Distributed by: Fox Film Corporation
- Release date: November 24, 1919
- Running time: 60 minutes
- Country: United States
- Language: Silent (English intertitles)

Wings of the Morning is a 1919 American silent drama film directed by J. Gordon Edwards and starring William Farnum, Herschel Mayall, Frank Elliott, G. Raymond Nye, Clarence Burton, and Harry De Vere. It is based on the 1903 novel by Louis Tracy. The film was released by Fox Film Corporation on November 24, 1919.

== Cast ==
- William Farnum as Capt. Robert Anstruther
- Herschel Mayall as Col. Costabel
- Frank Elliott as Lord Ventnor
- G. Raymond Nye as Mir Jan
- Clarence Burton as Taung Si Ali
- Harry De Vere as Sir Arthur Deane
- Louise Lovely as Iris Deane
- Genevieve Blinn as Lady Costabel

== Preservation ==
As none of copies were able to locate, the film is presumed lost.
