= The Joyous Trouble-Makers =

1920 film directed by J. Gordon Edwards

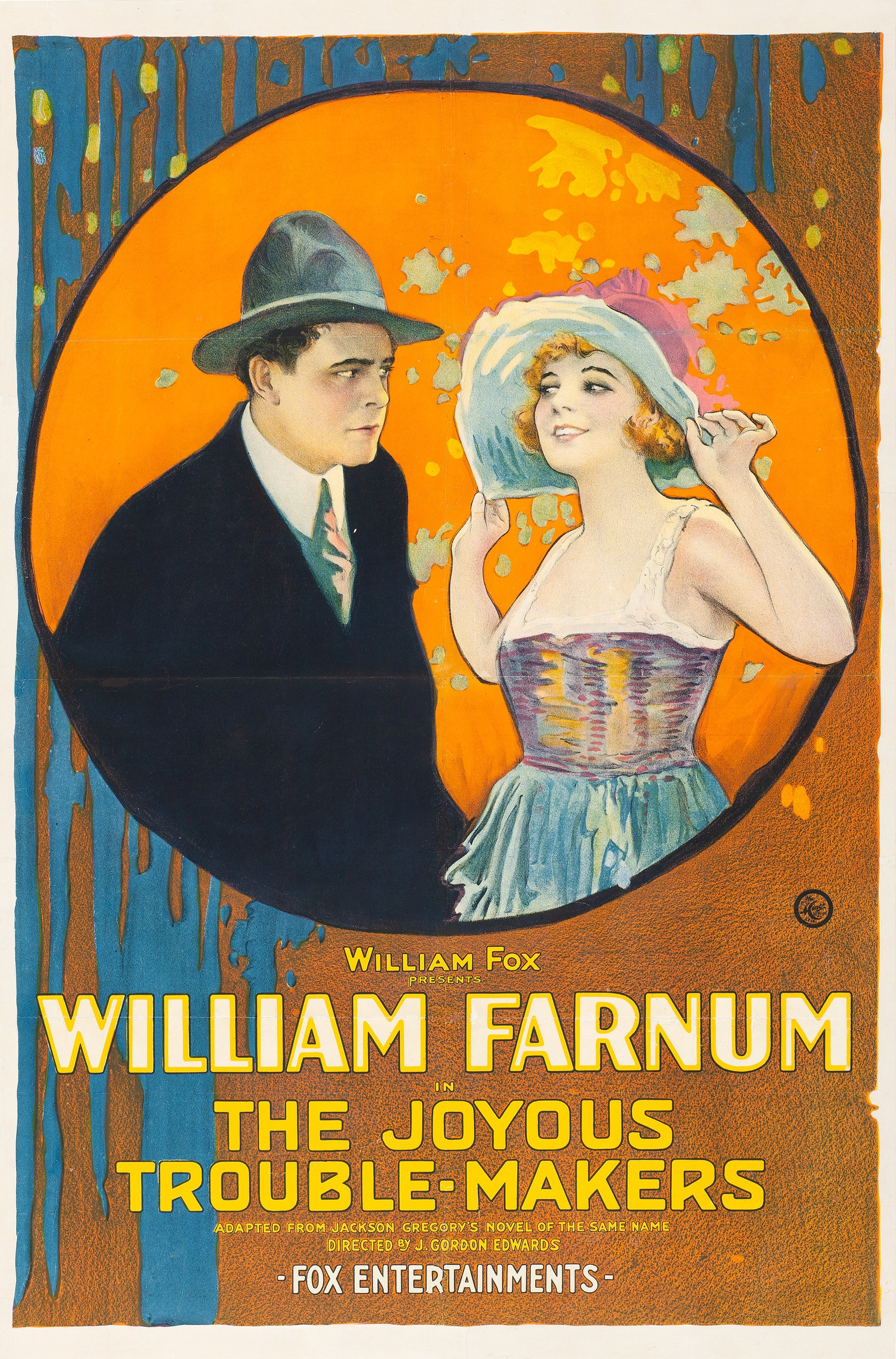
- Theatrical release poster
- Directed by: J. Gordon Edwards
- Written by: Charles Kenyon (scenario)
- Based on: The Joyous Trouble Maker; 1918 novel by Jackson Gregory
- Starring: William Farnum; Louise Lovely; Henry Hebert
- Cinematography: John Boyle
- Production company: Fox Film Corporation
- Distributed by: Fox Film Corporation
- Release date: July 1920
- Running time: 6 reels
- Country: United States
- Languages: Silent film (English intertitles)

The Joyous Trouble-Makers is a 1920 American silent Western adventure comedy film based on the 1918 novel The Joyous Trouble Maker by Jackson Gregory. It was directed by J. Gordon Edwards, and produced by William Fox. The film starred William Farnum, Louise Lovely and Henry Herbert.

== Plot ==
The film follows a rich young businessman named William Steele who buys his favorite vacation resort. The sale is immediately contested by Beatrice, who believes the property is part of her land. Beatrice challenges William to build a cabin on the property, promising him a home-cooked dinner if he succeeds.

The conflict is complicated when Beatrice is abducted by a third party, and William comes to her rescue. The two discover they have fallen in love, and rather than settling the bet, they combine their lands by getting married.

== Cast ==
- William Farnum as William Steele
- Louise Lovely as Beatrice Corlin
- Henry Hebert as Joe Embr
- Harry De Vere as Richard Stanton (as Harry Devere)
- G. Raymond Nye as Bill Rice
- Clarence Morgan as Turk Smith
- George Nichols as Cash Truit
- Sedley Brown as First Miner
- John Underhill as Butler
- Harry Archer as Under Butler
- Al Fremont as Rough
- Earl Crain as Rough
- Chiek Leyva as Rough
- Pedro León as Hostler (as Pedro De Leon)
- Claire de Lorez as Mrs. Denham (as Claire Delorez)
- Molly Bishop as Maid

== Preservation ==
The film is considered to be lost. This film alongside nearly all of J.Gordon Edward's filmography was destroyed in the 1937 Fox vault fire.
