= The Forbidden Path =

1918 film directed by J. Gordon Edwards

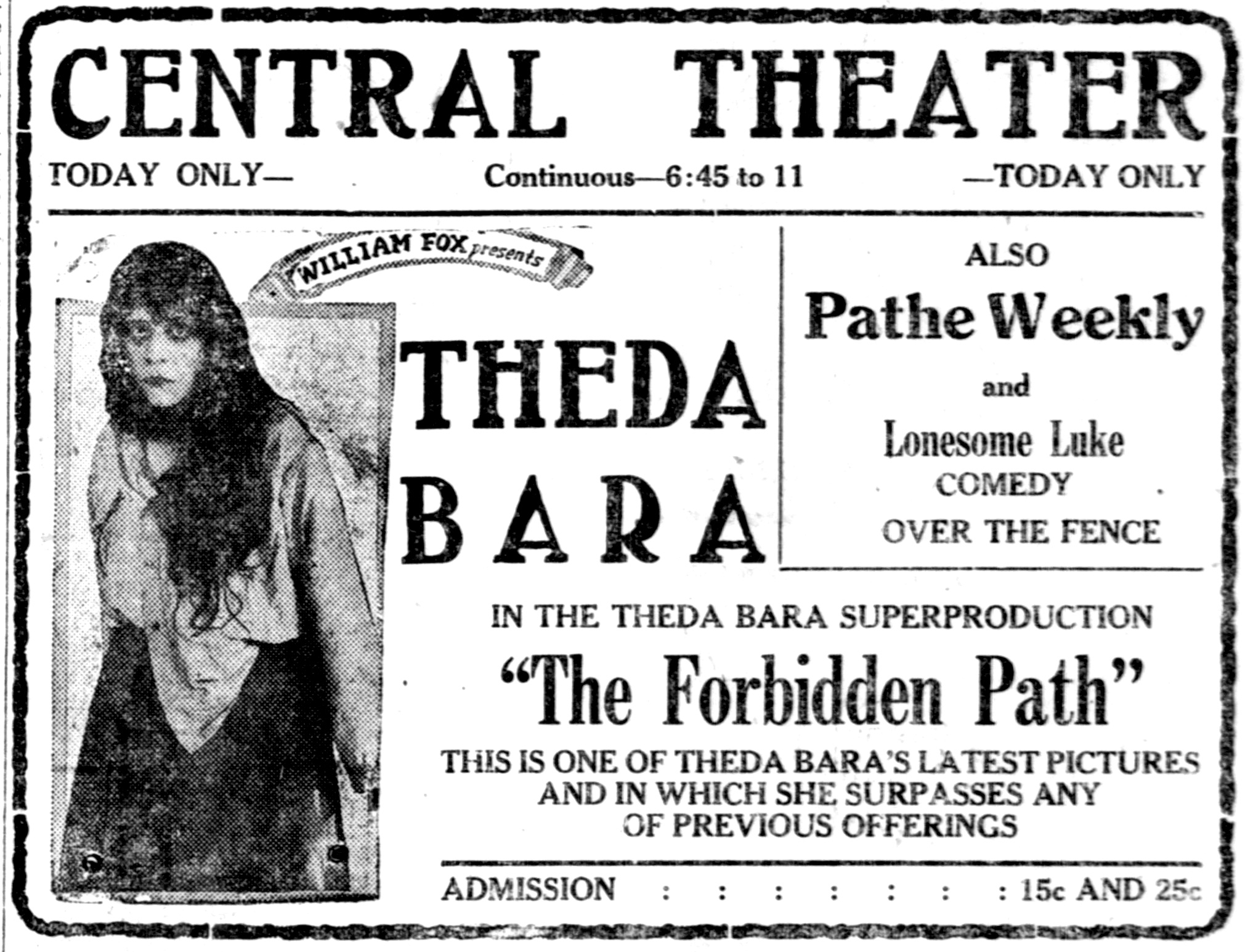
- Newspaper advertisement.
- Directed by: J. Gordon Edwards
- Written by: Adrian Johnson (scenario)
- Screenplay by: E. Lloyd Sheldon
- Story by: E. Lloyd Sheldon
- Produced by: William Fox
- Starring: Theda Bara; Hugh Thompson
- Cinematography: John W. Boyle
- Distributed by: Fox Film Corporation
- Release date: February 3, 1918
- Running time: 6 reels
- Country: United States
- Language: Silent (English intertitles)

The Forbidden Path is a 1918 American silent drama film directed by J. Gordon Edwards and starring Theda Bara. The film is now considered lost.

== Plot ==
As described in a film magazine, while posing for Felix Benavente (Mason) for a painting for a church, Mary Lynde (Bara), a true Madonna type unaware of the wiles of men, meets Robert Sinclair (Thompson) and, believing him sincere, accepts his attentions. Her father (Law) casts her from his home, and Mary goes to live at Sinclair's mountain lodge. However, Sinclair betrays her and deserts her. The death of her child takes the last bit of ambition from her and she sinks to the lowest depths. Felix, in search of a model to represent the end of the path of sin, rescues her. The appearance of Sinclair and his fiancée Barbara Reynolds (Martin) at the studio brings a desire for revenge to Mary, and she forces Sinclair to establish her in an apartment and supply her with money. To do this, Sinclair is forced to steal, and with this evidence Mary makes Sinclair promise to marry her. Sinclair tries to kill her, but on the morning of the wedding Mary goes to the church and confesses everything. Sinclair leaves in disgrace while Felix goes to comfort Mary.

== Cast ==
- Theda Bara as Mary Lynde
- Hugh Thompson as Robert Sinclair
- Sidney Mason as Felix Benavente
- Walter Law as Mr. Lynde
- Florence Martin as Barbara Reynolds
- Wynne Hope Allen as Mrs. Lynde
- Alphonse Ethier as William Sinclair
- Lisle Leigh as Mrs. Byrne
- Reba Porter as Tessie Byrne

== Reception ==
Like many American films of the time, The Forbidden Path was subject to cuts by city and state film censorship boards. For example, the Chicago Board of Censors issued the film an Adults Only permit and required cuts, in Reel 4, of all interior views of the house of ill fame showing inmates (leave in scene where three young women rush out to aid Mary and last scene in house where woman shows Mary the dead baby) to include all views of statuary in background, Reel 5, young woman soliciting man, closeup of alleged sex pervert knitting in foreground, all but one view of men of same character being ejected from resort to conform with National Board eliminations, and, Reel 6, a shooting scene.

== See also ==
- List of lost films
- 1937 Fox vault fire
