= Genevieve Blinn =

Canadian actress

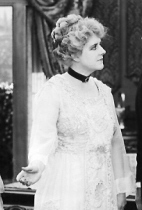
- American Methods (1917)
- Born: June 12, 1874; Fredericton, New Brunswick, Canada
- Died: July 20, 1956 (aged 82); San Anselmo, California, United States
- Occupation: Actress

Genevieve Clothilde Blinn (née Nannery; June 12, 1874 – July 20, 1956) was a Canadian actress who appeared on stage and in Hollywood silent motion pictures. She was a native of New Brunswick, Canada.

== Family ==
Genevieve Nannery was the last member of an old theater family from Saint John, New Brunswick. Her brother Ed Nannary was a stage actor in New York City and on the west coast. Her sister May performed as a star of the old Alcatraz Theater in San Francisco, California.

== Stage career ==
In October 1906 Blinn was the leading woman in the Ezra Kendall production of Swell, Elegant Jones. A comedy in three acts, the play was staged at the Wilmington, Delaware, Opera House. Brinn acted in stage roles opposite Richard Mansfield, Robert Mantel, and Willard Mack.

Blinn came to Los Angeles, California, in February 1912 as the leading lady of the Burbank Stock Company. Her arrival was in the press after she established a name for herself in eastern theatrical engagements. In New York she appeared at the head of the Crescent Stock Company for the previous five months. Her first performance with Burbank came as "Ann Brown" in a farce called Seven Days. The primary comedy figure, Blinn played a woman who believed in theosophy.

== Silent films ==
Blinn's career as a performer in movies began with a role as "Countess de Moray" in A Wife's Sacrifice (1916). She is best known for her role as the Bath-Sheba in The Queen of Sheba (1921). Aside from this feature, she was in a number of other films which starred Theda Bara.

Blinn retired from the stage and screen with the advent of sound motion pictures. Her last film was Common Clay (1930), in which she played the role of "Mrs. Fullerton."

== Personal life ==
On June 4, 1895, Genevieve Nannery married lumberman Irving L. Blinn from Los Angeles, California. She petitioned for a divorce from her husband in July 1904.

Blinn died in 1956 in San Rafael, California, following a long illness. A son, William Lewis Blinn, predeceased his mother. He was a member of the Olympic Club and a graduate of the University of Santa Clara.

== Partial filmography ==
Year	Film	Role	Notes
1916	A Wife's Sacrifice	Countess de Moray	
1917	Tangled Lives	Countess Dassori	
1917	Conscience	Mrs. Marsh	
1917	Cleopatra	Octavia	
1917	The Rose of Blood	Governess	
1917	Madame Du Barry	Duchess deGaumont	
1918	Salomé	Queen Marian	
1918	When a Woman Sins	Mrs. West	
1918	The Rainbow Trail	Ruth	
1919	When Fate Decides	Mrs. Veriker	
1919	The Last of the Duanes	Mrs. Lee	
1919	Wings of the Morning	Lady Costabel	
1920	The Path She Chose	Forewoman	
1921	The Queen of Sheba	Beth-Sheba	
1921	Crazy to Marry	Mrs. Landis	
1921	Don't Tell Everything	Mrs. Morgan	
1922	If I Were Queen	Sister Ursula	
1922	The Call of Home	Nancy Wayne	
1924	The Dramatic Life of Abraham Lincoln	Mrs. Ninian Edwards	
1930	Common Clay	Mrs. Fullerton	
