= Her Double Life =

1916 film directed by J. Gordon Edwards

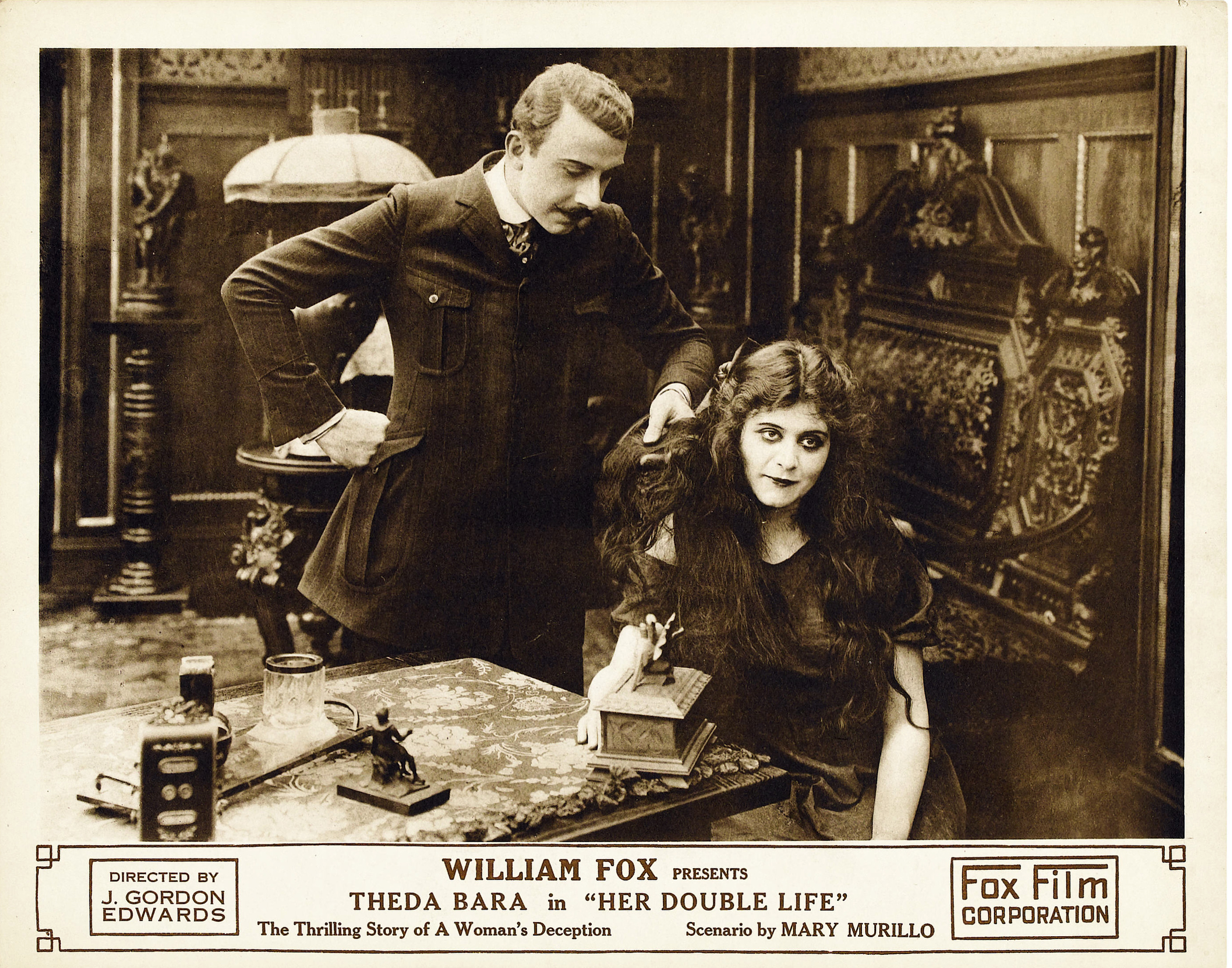
- Lobby card for the film featuring Holmes and Bara
- Directed by: J. Gordon Edwards
- Written by: Mary Murillo (scenario)
- Based on: The New Magdalen by Mary Murillo
- Starring: Theda Bara; Franklyn Hanna
- Cinematography: Phil Rosen
- Distributed by: Fox Film Corporation
- Release date: September 10, 1916
- Running time: 60 minutes
- Country: United States
- Language: Silent (English intertitles)

Her Double Life is a 1916 American silent drama film directed by J. Gordon Edwards and starring Theda Bara. It is based on the Mary Murillo's story The New Magdalen, who also wrote the scenario. The film is now considered lost.

== Plot ==
Mary Doone (Theda Bara) is a poor British girl who runs away from her adopted family because the father made a pass at her. She lives at a parish house, and at the outbreak of World War I, she becomes a Red Cross nurse. At the front she meets war correspondent Lloyd Stanley (Stuart Holmes). Stanley tries to have his way with her but she is saved when the hospital tent is bombed.

To get away from Stanley, she takes on the clothes and identity of an (apparently) dead girl, Ethel Wardley (Madeleine Le Nard). Ethel was on her way to live with Lady Clifford (Lucia Moore), an aunt she has never seen. So that's where Mary goes.

There she meets and falls in love with Ethel's cousin Elliott (A.H. Van Buren). They become engaged. But Ethel is not dead and she recovers from her wounds. She and Stanley head to the Clifford estate to blow Mary's cover. It doesn't matter, however, because Mary has already admitted the ruse, and the family has forgiven and accepted her anyhow.

== Cast ==
- Theda Bara as Mary Doone
- Franklyn Hanna as Doctor
- Stuart Holmes as Lloyd Stanley
- Walter Law as Longshoreman
- Carey Lee as Longshoreman's Wife
- Jane Lee as Naughty Girl
- Katherine Lee as Longshoreman's Daughter
- Madeleine Le Nard as Ethel Wardley
- Lucia Moore as Lady Clifford
- A. H. Van Buren as Elliot Clifford

== Brazil ==
Her Double Life was released in Brazil with the title Traição on September 25, 1916 at Cinema Iris, situated on Rua da Carioca 49-51, Rio de Janeiro. The film was in theaters at Cinema Iris, Avenida (which screened US silent films exclusively), Cine Ideal, and Palais for about seven weeks. Cinema Iris was an enterprise from J. Cruz Junior and the building was close to Cine Ideal at the same street. Cine Ideal belonged to the group Severiano Ribeiro, which still holds in its storehouse old silent films.

== Review ==
From the magazine American Cinematography:

Traição (Her Double Life), a production from Fox-Film Corporation.
"The Fox-Film Corporation, a U.S. company which is considered the most important industry of motion picture films in the world, did show yesterday in one of our theaters, one of its most beautiful productions: Traição (Her Double Life), which presents beautiful actress Theda Bara as protagonist.
The impression received by public was magnificent. The poignant drama unfolds in 40 minutes and reaches poignant outcome in a work of value. The interpretation by all Fox -Film artists is, if not flawless, very good. The photographic work is perfect and brings an absolute clarity, being led for a truly artistic way.
The actress Theda Bara, besides excellent artist, is a striking figure of woman. Two children which has been featured in film (Jane Lee and Katherine Lee) are two lovely, wonderful creatures of naturalness and grace. The mise-en-scene is absolute, revealing us comfort and good taste of the North-American culture.
Traição (Her Double Life) goes to provide us, without doubt, a complete success on Fox-Film in Brazil."

== See also ==
- List of lost films
- 1937 Fox vault fire
