= J. Gordon Edwards (director) =

Canadian born American film and stage director, producer, stage actor and writer

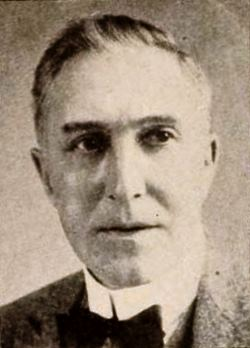
- Edwards c. 1920
- Born: James Gordon Edwards; June 24, 1867; Montreal, Province of Canada
- Died: December 31, 1925 (aged 58); New York City, U.S.
- Occupations: Film director, film producer, screenwriter
- Years active: 1914–1924
- Relatives: Blake Edwards (step-grandson)

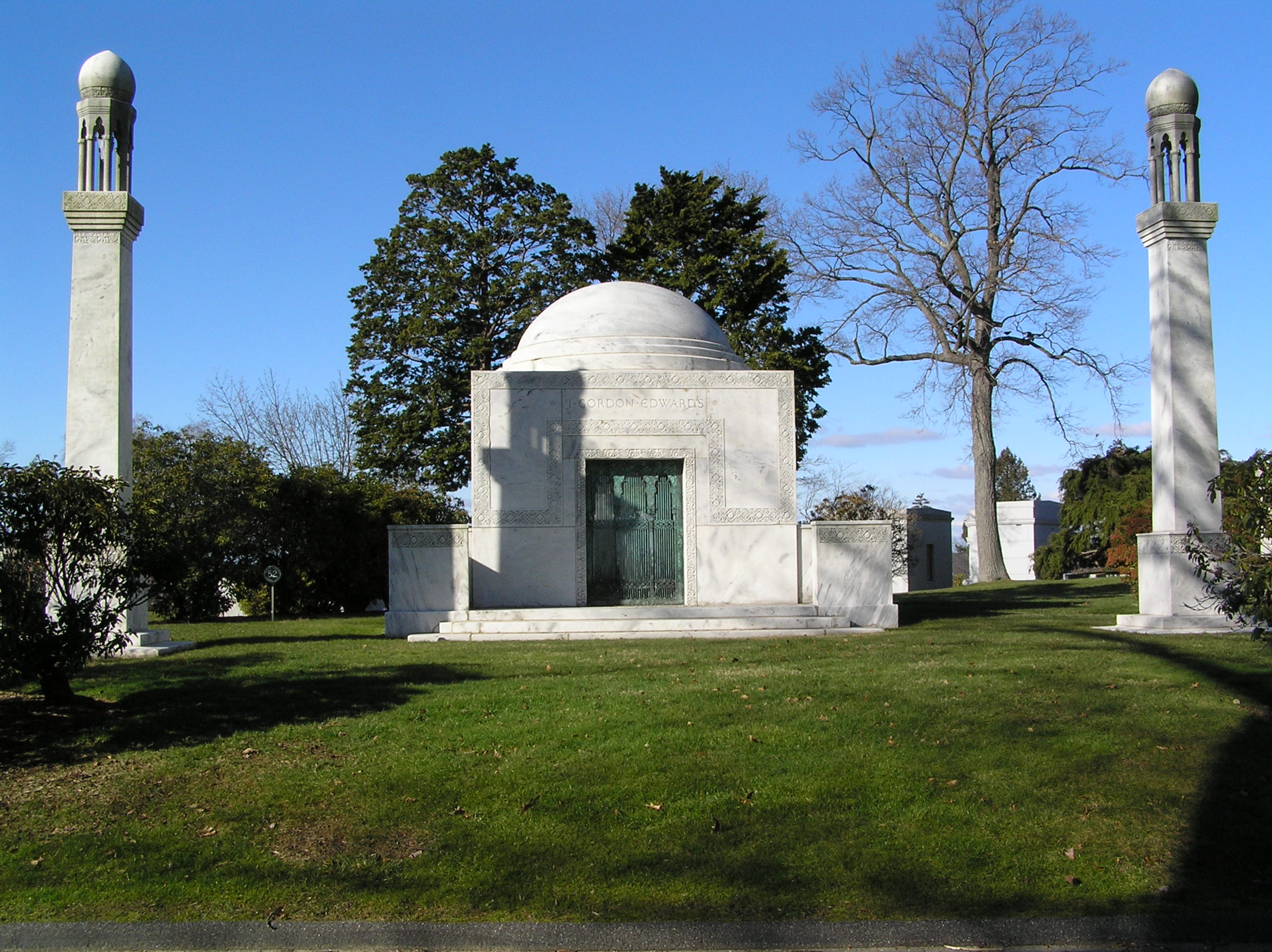
The tomb of J. Gordon Edwards

James Gordon Edwards (June 24, 1867 – December 31, 1925) was a Canadian-born film director, producer, and writer who began his career as a stage actor and stage director.

== Biography ==
James Gordon Edwards was born in Montreal in 1867 to parents of Scotch-French ancestry. He made his directorial debut with the 1914 film St. Elmo.

Edwards went on directing all of the Fox Film Corporation's mega-budget spectacles, including all of actress Theda Bara's productions between 1916 and 1919. Later, he became the production supervisor at Fox, and continued to direct until he died in 1925. One of his biggest projects was The Queen of Sheba (1921), a lost silent film which contained a huge chariot race, four years before Ben-Hur (1925). Essentially all of his films (other than a few low quality prints) for Fox Studios were lost in the 1937 Fox vault fire, which claimed 75% of all Fox films made before 1930. He was the stepgrandfather of director Blake Edwards.

He was married to actress Angela McCaull, daughter of opera impresario John A. McCaull. Edwards died of pneumonia at age 58 in New York City. His widow later commissioned a mausoleum in his honor at Kensico Cemetery, where both of their ashes reside.

== Filmography ==
=== Production supervisor ===
- A Daughter of the Gods (1916) – lost

=== Director ===
- St. Elmo (1914) – lost
- Life's Shop Window (1914) – lost
- A Woman's Resurrection (1915) – lost
- Anna Karenina (1915) – lost
- Should a Mother Tell (1915) – lost
- The Song of Hate (1915) – lost
- The Blindness of Devotion (1915) – lost
- The Unfaithful Wife (1915) – lost
- The Galley Slave (1915) – lost
- Under Two Flags (1916) – lost
- Her Double Life (1916) – lost
- A Wife's Sacrifice (1916) – lost
- The Vixen (1916) – lost
- The Green-Eyed Monster (1916) – lost
- Romeo and Juliet (1916) – lost
- The Spider and the Fly (1916) – lost
- The Tiger Woman (1917) – lost
- Tangled Lives (1917) – lost
- Her Greatest Love (1917) – lost
- The Rose of Blood (1917) – lost
- Madame Du Barry (1917) – lost
- Heart and Soul (1917) – lost
- The Darling of Paris (1917) – lost
- Cleopatra (1917) – lost
- Camille (1917) – lost
- When a Woman Sins (1918) – lost
- Under the Yoke (1918) – lost
- The Soul of Buddha (1918) – lost
- The She Devil (1918) – lost
- Salome (1918) – lost
- The Forbidden Path (1918) – lost
- A Woman There Was (1919) – lost
- Wolves of the Night (1919) – lost
- Wings of the Morning (1919) – lost
- When Men Desire (1919) – lost
- The Siren's Song (1919) – lost
- The Lone Star Ranger (1919) – lost
- The Light (1919) – lost
- The Last of the Duanes (1919) – lost
- The Orphan (1920) – lost
- Heart Strings (1920) – lost
- If I Were King (1920)
- Drag Harlan (1920)
- The Adventurer (1920) – lost
- The Joyous Trouble-Makers (1920) – lost
- The Scuttlers (1920) – lost
- The Queen of Sheba (1921) – lost
- His Greatest Sacrifice (1921)
- Nero (1922) – lost
- The Silent Command (1923)
- The Net – lost
- It Is the Law (1924) – lost

=== Writer ===
- The Queen of Sheba (1921) – lost
- A Wife's Sacrifice (1916) – lost
- The Blindness of Devotion (1915) – lost
