= Genevieve Hamper =

American stage and screen actress

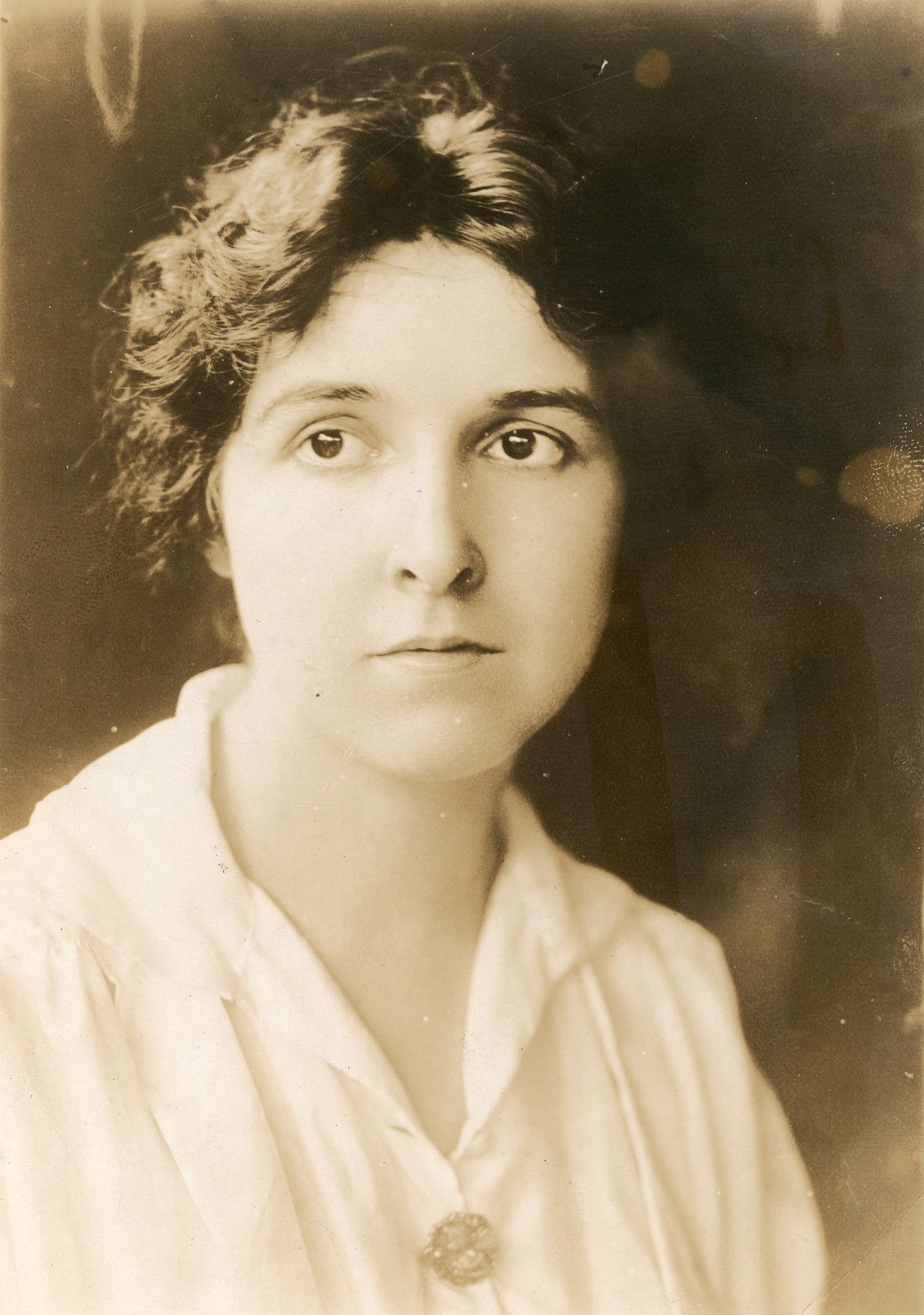
- Hamper in 1916
- Born: September 8, 1888; Detroit, Michigan, U.S.
- Died: February 13, 1971 (aged 82); New York City, U.S.
- Occupation: Actress
- Years active: 1910-1935
- Spouse(s): Robert B. Mantell (m. 1912; died 1928) John Alexander (m. 1928–1971)
- Children: 1

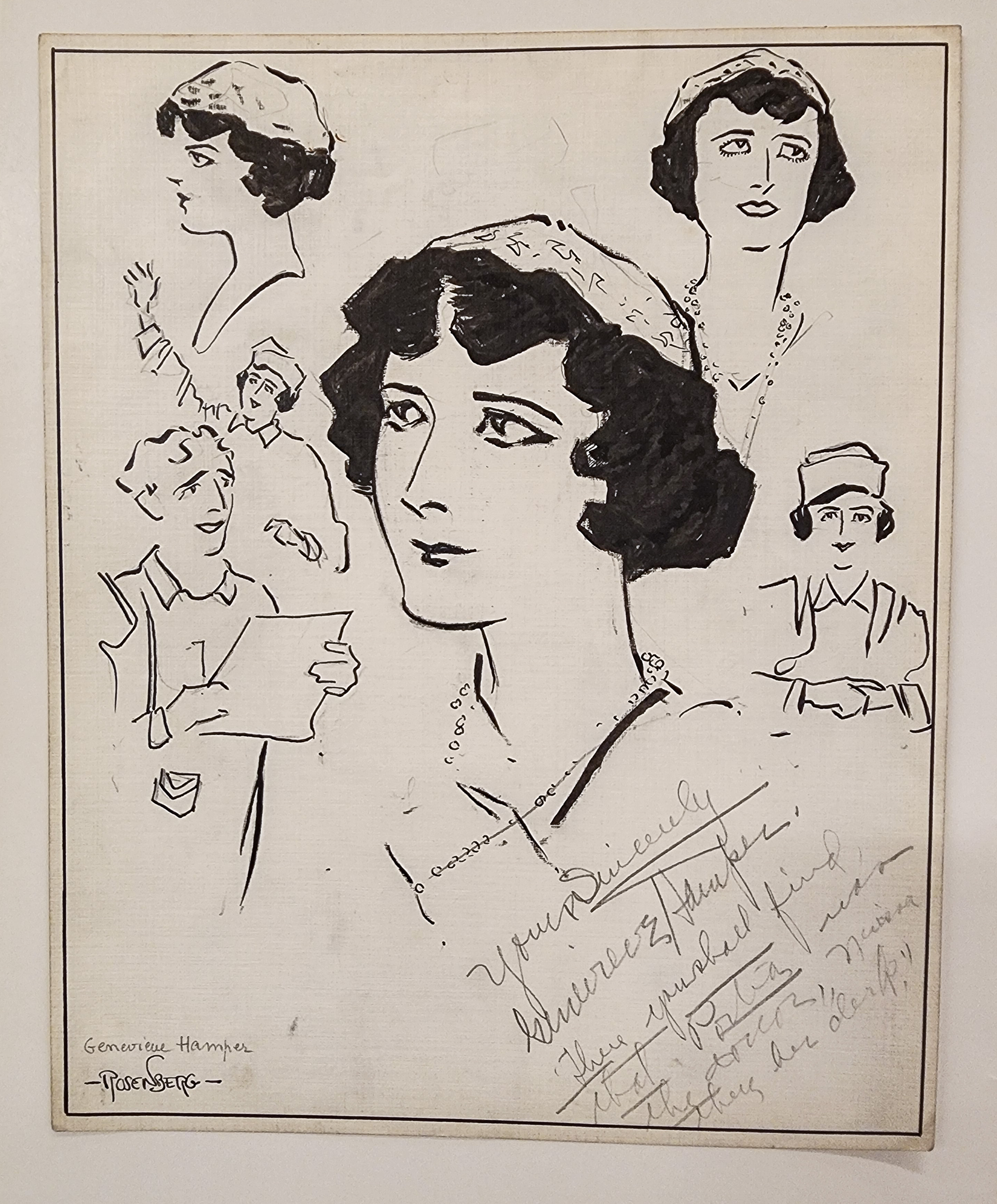
Signed drawing of Genevieve Hamper by Manuel Rosenberg for the Cincinnati Post 1919

Genevieve Hamper (September 8, 1888 – February 13, 1971) was an American stage and screen actress. A native of Detroit, Michigan, she trained as an actress in that city with A. M. Straub before joining Robert B. Mantell's theatre company in 1910. Mantell was a highly regarded actor in the works of William Shakespeare and he mentored Hamper in that repertoire. She married Mantell in 1912, and toured widely as a leading actress in his repertory theatre company with the organization's name ultimately becoming the Robert Mantell-Genevieve Hamper Shakespearean Repertoire Company (MHSRC). These tours included multiple appearances on Broadway. They continued to perform together until Mantell's death in 1928. In addition to their work on the stage, Robert and Genevieve co-starred in seven silent films released between 1915 and 1923.

After Mantell's death, Hamper married actor John Alexander who was her colleague in the MHSRC. She re-structured that organization under her own name, and continued to tour in Shakespeare plays until disbanding the organization in April 1930. After this her stage career slowed, but she continued to work until as late as 1935 in theaters in California. In retirement she mentored young actors in New Jersey.

== Early life and education ==
The daughter of Henry Hamper, Genevieve Hamper was born in Detroit, Michigan on September 8, 1888. After her birth the family moved to Greenville, Michigan where they resided until returning to Detroit in c. 1907. Her father was a sales manager in Detroit for the Globe Tobacco company, and shortly after returning to the city Genevieve trained as an actress with A. M. Straub. She began her career in 1910 when she was hired by Robert B. Mantell as a member of his theater company; making her professional debut on Thanksgiving Day 1910 in Chicago. She was mentored in Shakespeare repertoire by Mantell.

== Career with Robert B. Mantell ==
In 1910 Hamper portrayed Cordelia in King Lear at the Shubert Theatre in St. Louis with Mantell in the title role. That same year she performed with Mantell's troupe at the Alhambra Theatre in Milwaukee as Jessica in The Merchant of Venice, the Third Apparition in Macbeth and the Player Queen in Hamlet. She subsequently toured North America with Mantell's company in 1911 in these same plays and in productions of Julius Caeser (as Lucius), Othello, and Edward Bulwer-Lytton's Richelieu (as Julie De Mortemar). As Shakespeare's Cordelia she performed at the Majestic Theatre in Brooklyn, New York, the Auditorium Theatre in Baltimore, the Belasco Theatre in Washington D.C., the Princess Theatre in Montreal, Canada, the Royal Theatre in Toronto, the Grand Theatre in Atlanta, and on Broadway at Daly's Theatre among other venues.

On January 16, 1912 Hamper and Robert Bruce Mantell married in Pueblo, Colorado. After her marriage she continued to tour with Mantell's company in Shakespeare plays in 1912 for performances in Nebraska, California, Oregon, Washington state, Alberta, Canada, British Columbia, Manitoba, and Minnesota. and Michigan. In early September 1912 she gave birth to a son, Robert B. Mantell Jr. Later that same month she returned to the stage at the Adelphi Theatre in Philadelphia, and then took their four week old baby with them on tour to Baltimore before moving on to further performances in 1912 at theaters in New York, New Jersey, Virginia, Kentucky, Ohio, and Indiana. The company continued to tour widely in 1913 to places as far apart as Boston (where she performed the role of Martha in H. R. Maxwell's English language adaptation of Louis XI by Casimir Delavigne) and San Francisco (where she appeared as Prince Arthur in Shakespeare's King John).

Hamper and Mantell toured in both Canada and the United States in 1914 with Ophelia in Hamlet as a new role in her growing repertoire. In February 1915 the Mantell company's tour included a month long residency on Broadway at the 44th Street Theatre where Genevieve appeared first as Prince Arthur, followed by performances as Ophelia, Portia in The Merchant of Venice, Cordelia, Julie De Mortemar, and Juliet in Romeo and Juliet. After this, she and her husband branched out into work as silent film actors; starring opposite one another in the Fox Film Corporation movies The Blindness of Devotion (1915, as Renee Delacroix), The Unfaithful Wife (1915, as Juliet Romani), The Green-Eyed Monster (1916, as Claire), A Wife's Sacrifice (1916, as Countess de Moray), The Spider and the Fly (1916, as Blanche Le Noir), and Tangled Lives (1917, as Laura Fairlie / Ann Catherick). They later made one more film together with Goldwyn Pictures, Under the Red Robe (1923, as Duchess de Chevreuse).

In April 1917 Hamper returned to Broadway's 44th Street Theatre for further performances in Shakespeare plays with Mantell's company in roles like Portia and Lady Macbeth in Macbeth. She returned to that theatre again during the Mantell company's 1918 tour in reprisals of Richelieu Hamlet, Macbeth, and The Merchant of Venice. Ultimately Mantell's company was rebranded as the Robert Mantell-Genevieve Hamper Shakespearean Repertoire Company to reflect her leading position in the organization.

Mantell remained active as an actor with the Mantell-Hamper company until having a medical emergency during a performance in Columbus, Ohio in December 1927 which was given during a week long engagement of plays co-starring Genevieve. This event led to Mantell withdrawing from some of his remaining scheduled performances in the 1927-1928 season; although he was able to return to the company by February 1928 for performances with Genevieve and the actor John Alexander who was a leading man in the company. He continued to perform opposite his wife on tour until six weeks before his death when illness struck him in Baltimore and he was forced to retire. He died in June 1928 with Genevieve at his side. Genevieve married a second time soon after to her actor colleague, John Alexander, in October 1928.

== Later life and career ==
Hamper and Alexander continued to appear together in Shakespeare plays in 1928 after Mantell's death. In 1929 Hamper re-organized the Mantell-Hamper company under her own name and continued to tour nationally in performances of As You Like It, Macbeth, Romeo and Juliet, and Julius Caeser. The company continued to tour until disbanding in April 1930. While Genevieve was rehearsing for a production of The Merchant of Venice in Los Angeles (L.A.) in October 1933, her son committed suicide in the home they shared in that city. She appeared in supporting roles in two plays staged at the Mayan Theater in L.A. in 1934, and that same year performed in the play Double Door at the Curran Theatre in San Francisco. In 1935 she starred opposite Ian Maclaren as Mary Magdalene in the Biblical drama Pilgrimage Play at the Pilgrimage Theatre in L.A.

Hamper retired from the stage while her second husband continued to work as an actor. In retirement she rehearsed actors at Woodcrest, her country estate in Atlantic Highlands, New Jersey. Her directing approach included reducing or eliminating "the ranting and sonorous mouthing treatment of characters" while still delivering the essence of each play to the audience. She felt that the calmer approach would be favored by audiences that had become accustomed to films.

Hamper died at the Sanger Nursing Home in New York City in 1971, aged 82. Her second husband, John Alexander, died eleven years later in 1982.
