= The Net (1923 film) =

1923 American silent film

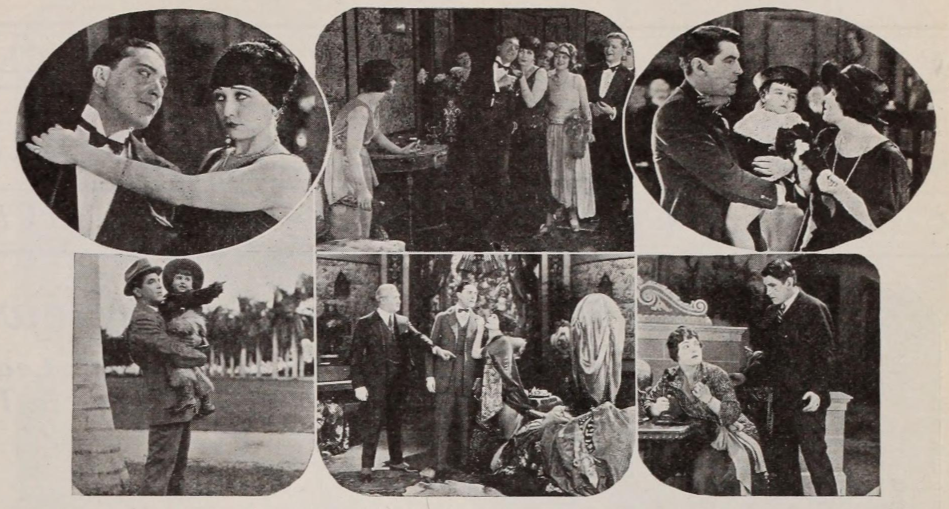
- Film stills from The Net
- Directed by: J. Gordon Edwards
- Screenplay by: Olga Linek Scholl; Virginia Tracy
- Based on: The Woman's Law by Maravene Thompson
- Starring: Barbara Castleton; Raymond Bloomer; Albert Roscoe
- Cinematography: Bennie Miggins
- Production company: Fox Film
- Distributed by: Fox Film
- Release date: December 2, 1923
- Running time: 7 reels
- Country: United States
- Language: Silent (English intertitles)

The Net is a 1923 American melodrama film directed by J. Gordon Edwards and starring Barbara Castleton, Raymond Bloomer, and Albert Roscoe. It is a silent film adaptation of the 1919 Broadway play of the same name, itself based on the novel The Woman's Law by Maravene Thompson. The film depicts the story of Allayne Norman (Castleton) and her husband Bruce (Bloomer). Bruce commits murder and convinces Allayne to help him blame the crime on a man suffering from amnesia (Roscoe). After Bruce dies and the man recovers, he marries Allayne.

The film's release was delayed almost a year from its originally announced date. Contemporary reviews were mixed to negative. Like many of Fox Film's early works, it was likely lost in the 1937 Fox vault fire.

== Plot ==
Allayne Norman's husband Bruce is a drunkard and gambler. Finally unable to tolerate his behavior, she goes to her artist cousin for assistance. Her husband follows her to demand more money. The resulting argument and fight ends with Bruce killing his wife's cousin. Shortly thereafter, an amnesiac man enters the studio. In an effort to avoid the consequences of his actions, Bruce places his identifying documents in the man's pockets, then flees the studio with Allayne and their son.

The police are unable to determine what has occurred, but identify the man as Bruce Norman based on the planted papers, and send him to what they presume to be his home, in the hope that the presence of family will aid the return of his memory. Fearing the truth would result in her son being known as the child of a murderer, Allayne identifies the man as her husband while Bruce remains in hiding.

When Bruce returns, he attempts to kill the man who has taken his place. He fails and is shot instead. The man regains his memory, allowing him to be cleared of wrongdoing. Having fallen in love during their time together, Allayne and the man marry.

== Cast ==
- Barbara Castleton as Allayne Norman
- Raymond Bloomer as Bruce Norman
- Albert Roscoe as the man
- Peggy Davis as the model
- William H. Tooker as Mr. Royce
- Helen Tracy as the nurse
- Eliah Nadel as the boy
- Claire de Lorez as the vamp
- Arthur Gordini as the artist
- Alexander Gaden as the inspector
- Byron Douglas as the doctor

Alma Bennett was initially reported as a member of the cast, but the American Film Institute believes she did not appear in the finished film. This was Castleton's final film appearance.

== Production ==
Maravene Thompson's The Woman's Law was originally serialized in The American Magazine between November 1913 and April 1914 before being published as a novel in 1914. The first film version was produced Arrow Film and distributed by Pathé in 1916. Thompson adapted her novel into a play, titled The Net, which was performed at Broadway's 48th Street Theatre. Channing Pollock praised the quality of the production and cast, which included Claire Whitney, but found elements of the story unconvincing. It ran for eight showings and was considered a success.

In December 1922, Fox Film announced the addition of six films to its schedule for planned release in January 1923, including an adaptation of The Net. (Note: The others were: The Village Blacksmith, A Friendly Husband, Paradise Road, The Face on the Bar-Room Floor, and Does It Pay?.) However, filming had not begun on The Net at that time and its release was repeatedly delayed. In January, the studio claimed that director J. Gordon Edwards was "screening the final scenes" and set a February 25 release date. In April, it was still advertised for the "coming season", but by October it was described as a "1924 drama". The Net was finally screened on December 2, 1923.

It was also released internationally: in France in February 1924, Argentina in March, and Brazil in August.

== Reception and legacy ==
The Net was not well received by critics. The Film Daily was scathing, calling the film a "feeble attempt at entertainment" with a "terrible story" and inadequate cast. They also reported the opinions of local critics. Despite issues with the plot, the Rochester, New York reviewer was generally positive; however, the Cleveland review opined that the "acting doesn't warrant complimentary adjectives". Photoplay's was also mostly negative, but thought the film might appeal to fans of Bertha M. Clay.

The Net is believed to be lost. The 1937 Fox vault fire destroyed most of Fox's silent films, and the Library of Congress is not aware of any extant copies. Because little of Edwards's work survives, few of his films have drawn attention from modern authors, but film historian Larry Langman described The Net as an example of the 1920s trend to use amnesia as a plot element in crime films.

== See also ==
- List of lost silent films (1920–1924)

== Bibliography ==
- Brownlow, Kevin (1976) [1968]. The Parade's Gone By.... University of California Press. ISBN 978-0-520-03068-8.
- Goble, Alan, ed. (1999). The Complete Index to Literary Sources in Film. Bowker-Saur. ISBN 978-1-85739-229-6.
- Langman, Larry (1998). American Film Cycles: The Silent Era. Greenwood Press. ISBN 978-0-313-30657-0.
- Slide, Anthony (2000). Nitrate Won't Wait: A History of Film Preservation in the United States. McFarland. ISBN 978-0-7864-0836-8.
- Solomon, Aubrey (2011). The Fox Film Corporation, 1915–1935: A History and Filmography. McFarland. ISBN 978-0-7864-6286-5.
- Wlaschin, Ken (2008). The Silent Cinema in Song, 1896–1929. McFarland. ISBN 978-0-7864-3804-4.
