= Absinthe (film) =

Absinthe is the title of two early American silent films:

- Absinthe (1913 film), an American silent film starring Glen White
- Absinthe (1914 film), an American silent film starring King Baggot
