= The Tiger Woman (1917 film) =

1917 American film

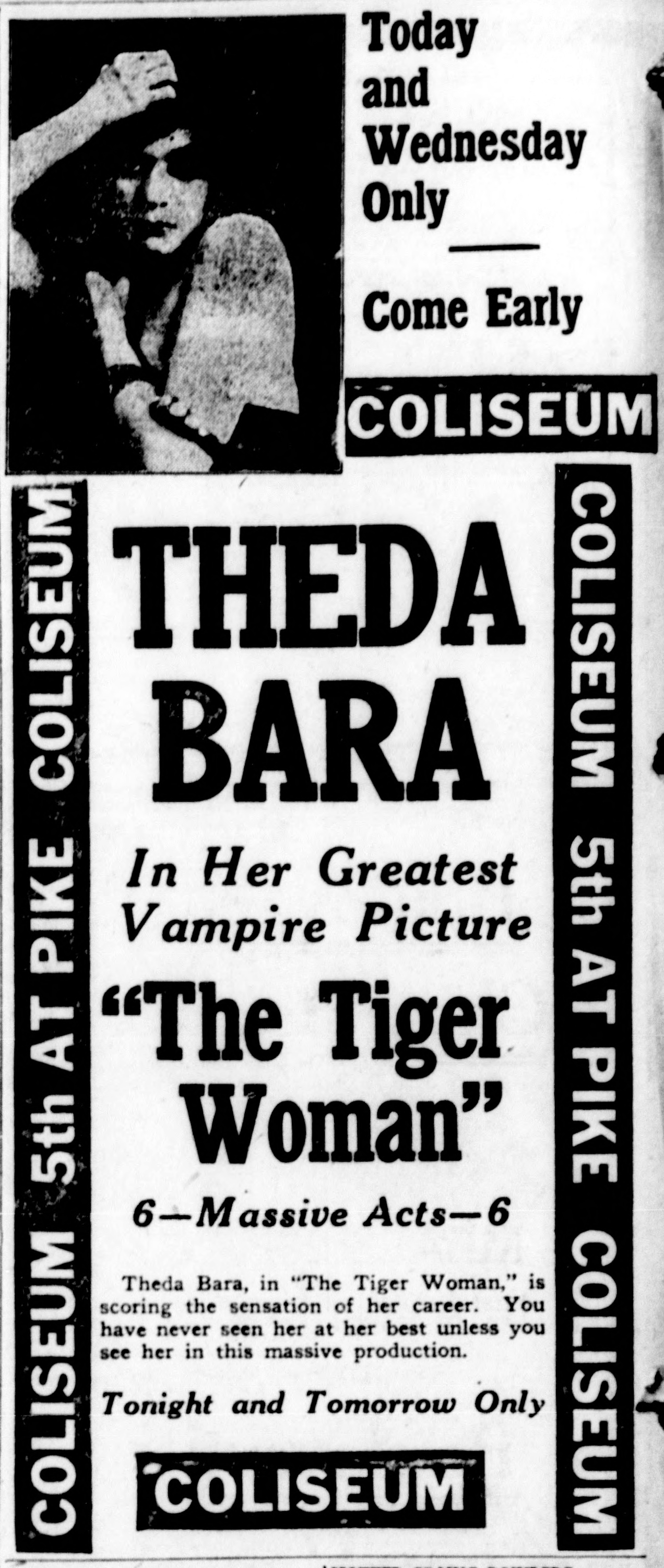
- Advertisement in The Seattle Star
- Directed by: J. Gordon Edwards; George Bellamy
- Written by: Adrian Johnson (scenario)
- Story by: James W. Adams
- Produced by: William Fox
- Starring: Theda Bara; Edward Roseman
- Cinematography: Phil Rosen
- Distributed by: Fox Film Corporation
- Release date: February 8, 1917
- Running time: 60 minutes
- Country: United States
- Language: Silent (English intertitles)

The Tiger Woman is a lost 1917 American silent drama film directed by J. Gordon Edwards and George Bellamy and starring Theda Bara.

== Plot ==
Countess Irma (Theda Bara) is a Russian villainess who becomes the ruthless Princess Petrovich, who loves only her pearls. Her husband, the Prince (Edward Roseman), sells state secrets to a spy to pay her exorbitant bills, and her response is to report him to the secret police.

Then she runs off to Monte Carlo with her lover, Count Zerstoff (Emil DeVarney), but she poisons him after he racks up a load of gambling losses. She goes to America followed by Stevan, a disgruntled servant (John Webb Dillion) and there she wreaks more havoc.

The Princess' next victim is Edwin Harris (Glen White). He dumps his fiancée (Florence Martin) for the vamp and steals money from his father (Edward Holt). The shock kills the father and the Princess has Edwin sent off to jail. She next becomes involved with Edwin's brother, Mark (Herbert Heyes), inspiring him to leave his wife (Mary Martin) and child (Kittens Reichert).

Finally Edwin and Stevan (who also has been sent to jail through the Princess' machinations) get away from their confinement and head over to the vamp's. She tries to stab Stevan, but he turns the knife onto herself and she is fatally stabbed. But before she dies she confesses all, which clears the name of both Harris brothers, and Mark returns to his wife.

== Cast ==
Actor	Role
Theda Bara	Princess Petrovitch
Edward Roseman	Prince Petrovitch
Louis Dean	The Baron
Emil DeVarney	The Count Zerstoff
John Webb Dillion	Stevan
Glen White	Edwin Harris
Mary Martin	Mrs. Edwin Harris
Herbert Heyes	Mark Harris
Kittens Reichert	Harris Child
Edward Holt	Harris Boy's Father
Florence Martin	Marion Harding
George Clarke	Marion's Father
Kate Blancke	Marion's Mother
Charles McCann	Butler
Hans Unterkircher	Uncredited

== Brazil ==
The film was released in Brazil with title Mulher Tigre on July 26, 1917 at Cine Ideal, situated at the centre of Rua da Carioca 60-62, Rio de Janeiro. It was a hit amongst the Brazilian audience for six weeks and it was also exhibited on Cines Capitolio and Pathé from August 5, 1917. Cine Pathé was a cinema located at Floriano square also called Cinelândia. Cine Ideal belonged to the group Severiano Ribeiro, which still holds in its storehouse a couple of old silent films.

== Preservation ==
With no holdings located in archives, The Tiger Woman is considered a lost film.

== See also ==
- 1937 Fox vault fire
