= Helen Tracy =

American actress (1850–1924)

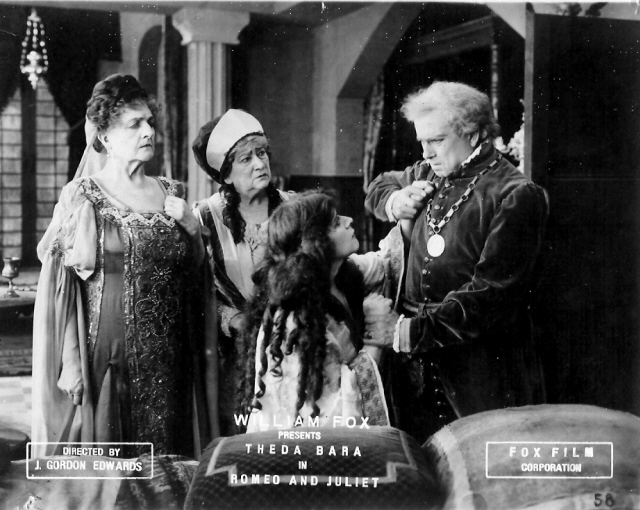
- Film still (left to right) of Tracy, Alice Gale, Theda Bara, Edward Holt in Romeo and Juliet (1916)
- Born: Helen T. Tracy; May 7, 1850; Jacksonville, Florida, U.S.
- Died: September 5, 1924 (aged 74); Staten Island, New York, U.S.
- Occupation: actress
- Years active: 1916-1924
- Children: Virginia Tracy

Helen Tracy (May 7, 1850 – September 5, 1924) was an American stage and silent film actress.

Tracy was born in Jacksonville, Florida, and grew up in San Francisco.

Tracy's stage career began there in stock theater at the California Theatre. From there she went east, acting in stock for two years at the Boston Theatre. On September 20, 1870, she opened with Wallack's stock company, portraying Julia in The Rivals. Her Broadway debut came in Birth (1871), and her last Broadway credit was Romance (1921).

Tracy began working in films around 1916 and did only a few features.

She was the mother of Virginia Tracy through a relationship with actor John McCullough.

She died at the Actors' Fund Home on Staten Island on September 5, 1924.

== Selected filmography ==
- Romeo and Juliet (1916)
- The Land of Promise (1917)
- Sunshine Nan (1918)
- Let's Get a Divorce (1918)
- Blue-Eyed Mary (1918)
- The Net (1923)
- Twenty-One (1923)
