= Charles E. Graham =

American actor

- Born: October 1865; Maryland, United States
- Died: January 2, 1948 (aged 82); New York City, United States
- Occupation: Actor
- Years active: 1912–1926 (film)

Charles E. Graham (1865–1948) was an American film actor of the silent era.

== Selected filmography ==
- Arizona (1913)
- The $5,000,000 Counterfeiting Plot (1914)
- A Modern Magdalen (1915)
- The Curious Conduct of Judge Legarde (1915)
- The Bondman (1916)
- The Auction Block (1917)
- The Tides of Fate (1917)
- My Own United States (1918)
- The Wall Street Mystery (1920)
- The Song of the Soul (1920)
- The Headless Horseman (1922)
- Dawn of Revenge (1922)
- Gateway to the West (1924)
- The Making of O'Malley (1925)
- The Untamed Lady (1926)

== Bibliography ==
- Ken Wlaschin. Silent Mystery and Detective Movies: A Comprehensive Filmography. McFarland, 2009.
