= Pitfalls of a Big City =

1919 film by Frank Lloyd

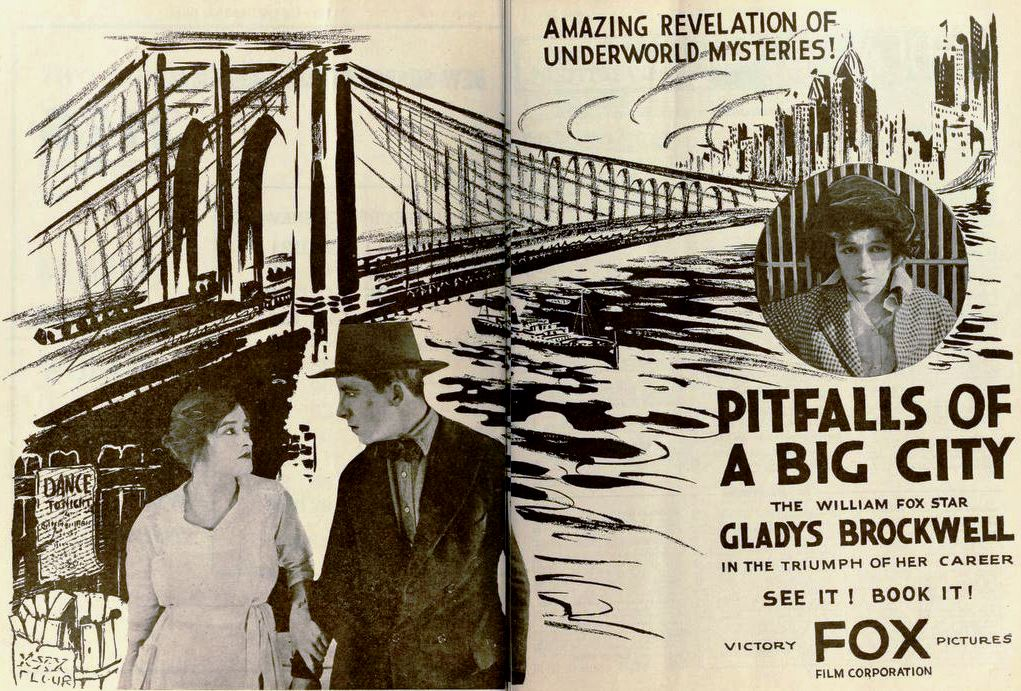
- Advertisement for the Pitfalls of a Big City on pages 194 and 195 of the Moving Picture World (April 12, 1919)
- Directed by: Frank Lloyd
- Written by: Bennett Cohen
- Produced by: William Fox
- Starring: Gladys Brockwell; William Scott; William Sheer
- Production company: Fox Film Corporation
- Distributed by: Fox Film Corporation
- Release date: April 13, 1919
- Running time: 60 minutes
- Country: United States
- Languages: Silent; English intertitles

Pitfalls of a Big City is a 1919 American silent drama film directed by Frank Lloyd and starring Gladys Brockwell, William Scott and William Sheer.

== Cast ==
- Gladys Brockwell as Molly Moore
- William Scott as Jerry Sullivan
- William Sheer as Spike Davis
- Neva Gerber as Marion Moore
- Al Fremont as Dave Garrity
- Ashton Dearholt as Ted Pemberton
- Janice Wilson as Alice Pemberton

== Bibliography ==
- Solomon, Aubrey. The Fox Film Corporation, 1915-1935: A History and Filmography. McFarland, 2011.
