= Guido Trento =

Italian actor

- Born: 21 June 1892; Italy
- Died: 31 July 1957 (aged 65); San Francisco, California; United States
- Resting place: Holy Cross Catholic Cemetery Colma, San Mateo County, California, USA
- Other name: Guy Trent
- Occupation: Actor
- Years active: 1913–1932 (film)

Guido Trento (21 June 1892 – 31 July 1957) was an Italian stage and film actor.

== Career ==
Trento appeared in over seventy films during his career, mainly in Italy during the silent era. In 1922 he appeared in Fox's Italian-shot historical epic Nero (1922). He followed it up with later roles for Fox such as Street Angel (1928). He emigrated to the United States, where he settled and died in 1957. His career largely tapered out following the arrival of sound.

His final screen appearance was in RKO Radio Pictures's B movie Secrets of the French Police (1932). Following America's entry into World War II, he was interned in Fort Missoula Internment Camp but released in 1943.

== Selected filmography ==
- La vittima (1914)
- Amore e morte a Sorrento (1914)
- Un testamento (1914)
- Vette del Trentino (1915)
- Guerra redentrice (1915)
- Cento H.P. (1915)
- Il canto dell'agonia (1916)
- Il suicidio (1916)
- Il nemico occulto (1916)
- I novanta giorni (1916)
- Oltre i confini dell'anima (1917)
- Il buon ladrone (1917)
- La felicità (1917)
- La pecorella smarrita (1917)
- Maternità (1917)
- Le due orfanelle (1918)
- Maman Colibrì (1918) – Visconte Giorgio di Chambry
- Frou-Frou (1918) – Paolo Valréas
- La storia di un peccato (1918)
- L'orgoglio (1918)
- Una donna funesta (1918)
- Mademoiselle Monte Cristo (1918)
- L'ira (1918) – Arturo
- Lolita (1918)
- I nostri buoni villici (1918)
- L'accidia (1919) – engineer Ottavio Fortis
- L'invidia (1919) – Duque
- Il marito dell'amica (1919)
- The Race to the Throne (1919)
- Il principe Zilah (1919)
- Dora o Le spie (1919) – Michel Orloff
- Dopo il perdono (1919)
- Centocelle (1919)
- La lussuria (1919)
- La spada di Damocle (1919)
- L'idolo del dottore (1919)
- Il bacio di Dorina (1919)
- I cavalieri del poker (1919)
- La moglie scacciata (1919)
- La dame en gris (1919)
- L'autobus della morte (1919)
- La signora innamorata (1920)
- The Fear of Love (1920)
- La villa elettrica (1920)
- Il canto di Circe (1920)
- La povera piccola (1920)
- La beffa della vita (1920)
- Anna (1920)
- Plasmò... distrusse... (1920)
- Stella (1920)
- Il fiore del silenzio (1920)
- Voi! (1920)
- L'enigma di un processo celebre (1920)
- Il più forte (1921)
- Il mio carcere (1921)
- La gigolette (1921)
- L'oro e l'orpello (1922)
- Rabagas (1922)
- Idillio tragico (1922)
- Nero (1922) – Tullius
- L'ombra, la morte, l'uomo (1923)
- The Shepherd King (1923) – Saul
- La leggenda del Piave (1924)
- It Is the Law (1924) – Manee
- Street Angel (1928) – Neri – Police Sergeant
- The Charge of the Gauchos (1928) – Monteros
- Il Grande Sentiero (1931) – Paolo Clark
- Pardon Us (1931) – Minor Role (uncredited)
- Secrets of the French Police (1932) – Count de Marsay (final film role)

== Bibliography ==
- Holston, Kim R. Movie Roadshows: A History and Filmography of Reserved-Seat Limited Showings, 1911-1973. McFarland, 2012.
- Solomon, Aubrey. The Fox Film Corporation, 1915-1935: A History and Filmography. McFarland, 2011.
