= The Darling of Paris =

1917 film by J. Gordon Edwards

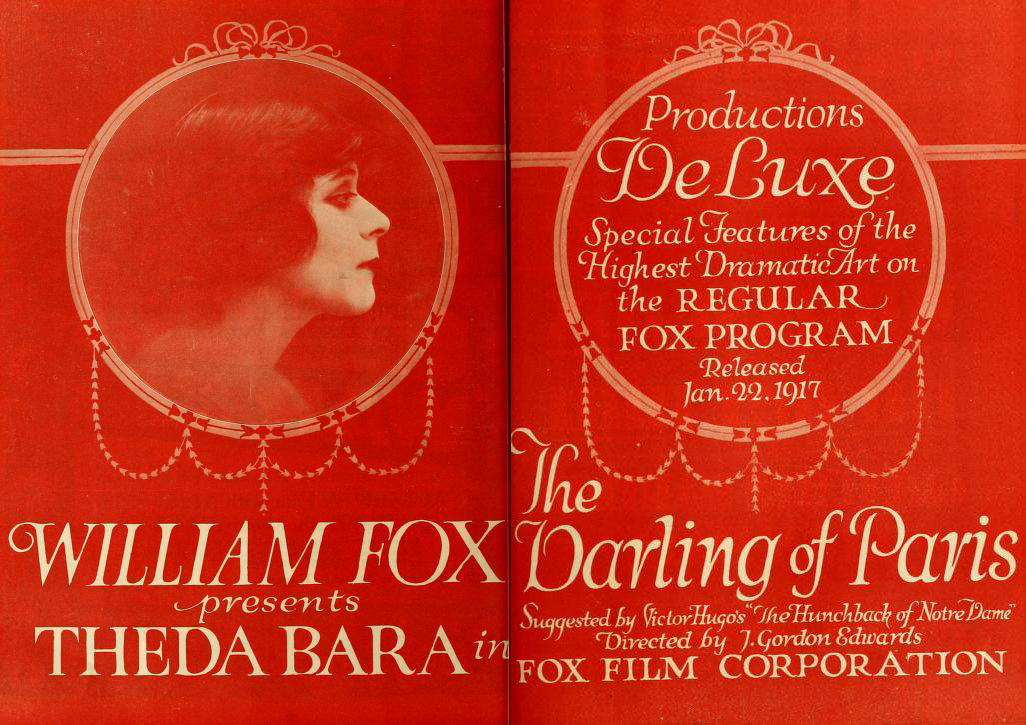
- Directed by: J. Gordon Edwards
- Written by: Adrian Jackson (scenario)
- Based on: The Hunchback of Notre-Dame by Victor Hugo
- Produced by: William Fox
- Starring: Theda Bara; Glen White
- Cinematography: Phil Rosen
- Distributed by: Fox Film Corporation
- Release date: January 22, 1917
- Running time: 60 minutes
- Country: United States
- Language: Silent (English intertitles)

The Darling of Paris is a 1917 American silent romantic drama film directed by J. Gordon Edwards and starring Theda Bara and Glen White. It was a very loose film adaptation of the 1831 novel The Hunchback of Notre-Dame by Victor Hugo. It was produced by William Fox. The Darling of Paris was later re-edited from six to five reels and re-released by Fox on February 16, 1919. The film is now considered lost.

== Plot ==
The wealthy girl Esmeralda (Theda Bara) is kidnapped by gypsies at birth and becomes, as one might assume, the darling of Paris. She is loved by the bell ringer and former hunchback Quasimodo (Glen White), Frollo (Walter Law), the wicked surgeon who cares for him, and an equally wicked Captain Phoebus (Herbert Heyes).

However, the titular hunchback is downplayed in favor of gypsy dancing girl Esmerelda. The surgeon kills the Captain and frames Esmeralda, but after many merry mix-ups, she winds back with her wealthy family, happily wed to Quasimodo.

== Cast ==
Theda Bara	Esmeralda
Glen White	Quasimodo
Walter Law	Claude Frollo
Herbert Heyes	Captain Phoebus
Carey Lee	Paquette
John Webb Dillon	Clopin Trouillefou
Louis Dean	Pierre Gringoire
Alice Gale	Gypsy Queen

== Production notes ==
The film was shot at the Fox Studios then located in Fort Lee, New Jersey. An elaborate set was constructed on the back lot to recreate Paris where the film is set. The set also included a reproduction of the Notre Dame de Paris.

== Brazil ==
The release in Brazil was done with the title A Favorita de Paris on September 17, 1917, on the cinemas Ideal and Pathé, both from Rua da Carioca 60–62, Rio de Janeiro. It also debuted on Cine Haddock Lobo on September 30, 1917. Cinema Haddock Lobo was located near the Largo da Segunda-Feira, in a street of several theaters. Cine Ideal belonged to the group Severiano Ribeiro, which still holds in its storehouse old silent films. For over a month it grossed a huge box office and was a success of public and critical acclamation on Rio society.

The highest-grossing releases in September on Rio:

Release	Cinema	Film	Leading	Enterprise
Sept. 17, 1917	ODEON	Em Casa Alheia (A Kentucky Cinderella)	Ruth Clifford	Bluebird Photoplays
Sept. 17, 1917	PALAIS	Implacável Destino (The Gown of Destiny)	Alma Rubens	Triangle Film Corporation
Sept. 17, 1917	PATHÉ	A Favorita de Paris (The Darling of Paris)	Theda Bara	Fox-Film
Sept. 17, 1917	IDEAL	A Favorita de Paris (The Darling of Paris)	Theda Bara	Fox-Film
Sept. 17, 1917	AVENIDA	A Cruz da Vitória (The Victoria Cross)	Lou Tellegen	Jesse L. Lasky Feature Play Company
Sept. 10, 1917	PARISIENSE	Os Maridos da Divorciada (The Men She Married)	Gail Kane, Montagu Love	Peerless Productions
Sept. 03, 1917	OLYMPIA	Palermas e Malandrins (Haystacks and Steeples)	Bobby Vernon, Gloria Swanson	Keystone Film Company
Aug. 20, 1917	VELO	Vítima da Tentação (Her Temptation)	Gladys Brockwell	Fox-Film
Aug. 20, 1917	ESTRELLA	Porta do Amor (A Love Case)	Harry Depp	Triangle Film Corporation
Aug. 13, 1917	ÍRIS	Judex (Judex)	René Cresté	Société des Etablissements L. Gaumont

== See also ==
- List of lost films
