= Louis Dean =

American actor

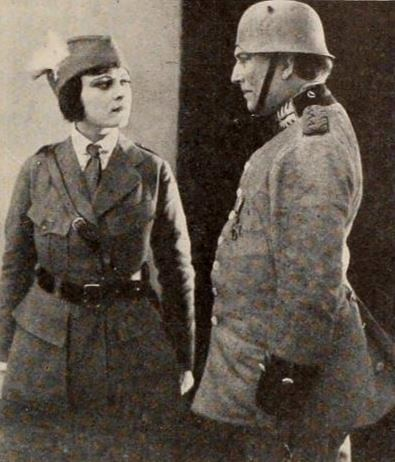
- Still of Sylvia Breamer and Dean in The Common Cause (1919)
- Born: May 3, 1874; Wilmington, Delaware
- Died: April 8, 1933 (aged 58); Honolulu, Hawaii
- Occupation: Actor
- Years active: 1911–1923

Louis Dean (3 May 1874 – 8 April 1933), was an American actor. He appeared in 16 films between 1917 and 1923.

He was born in Wilmington, Delaware.

== Personal life ==
During the 1930s, Dean lived in Honolulu with his wife Virginia Duncan, where they owned a hotel and cafe on Kalākaua Avenue. He died of a heart attack while at the business on April 8, 1933.

== Partial filmography ==
- The Darling of Paris (1917)
- The Tiger Woman (1917)
- My Four Years in Germany (1918)
- Queen of the Sea (1918)
- The Birth of a Race (1918)
- The Common Cause (1919)
- The Symbol of the Unconquered (1920)
- The Blood Barrier (1920)
- Man and His Woman (1920)
- Cardigan (1922)
- The Woman Who Fooled Herself (1922)
- Dawn of Revenge (1922)
- Married People (1922)
