= Twenty-One (1923 film) =

1923 film by John S. Robertson

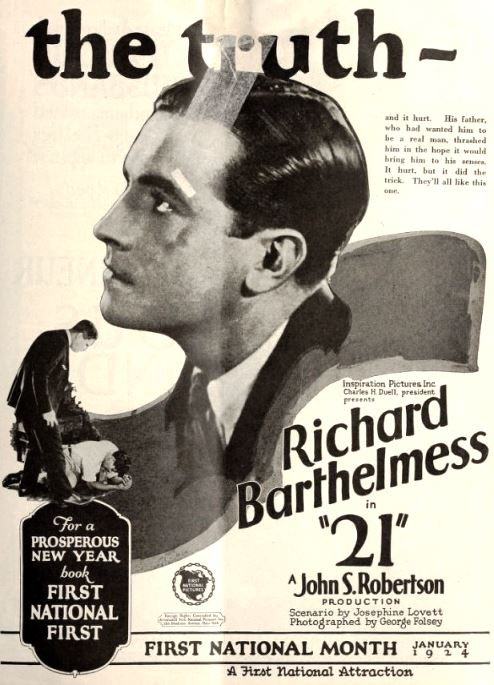
- Advertisement
- Directed by: John S. Robertson
- Written by: Josephine Lovett
- Produced by: Charles H. Duell
- Starring: Richard Barthelmess; Dorothy Mackaill; Joe King
- Cinematography: George J. Folsey
- Production company: Inspiration Pictures
- Distributed by: First National Pictures
- Release date: December 17, 1923
- Running time: 70 minutes
- Country: United States
- Language: Silent (English intertitles)

Twenty-One is a 1923 American silent drama film directed by John S. Robertson and starring Richard Barthelmess, Dorothy Mackaill, and Joe King.

== Cast ==
- Richard Barthelmess as Julian McCullough
- Dorothy Mackaill as Lynnie Willis
- Joe King as Mr. McCullough
- Dorothy Cumming as Mrs. McCullough
- Eleanor Lawson as Paula
- Bradley Barker as Peter Straski
- Ivan F. Simpson as Mr. Willis
- Nellie Parker Spaulding as Mrs. Willis
- Helen Tracy as Mrs. Jordan
- Betty Bronson (uncredited)
- Howard Merrill as Julian McCullough as a boy (uncredited)
- Kit Wain as Little boy (uncredited)

== Bibliography ==
- Monaco, James. The Encyclopedia of Film. Perigee Books, 1991. ISBN 0-399-51604-2
