= Glen White (actor) =

American actor

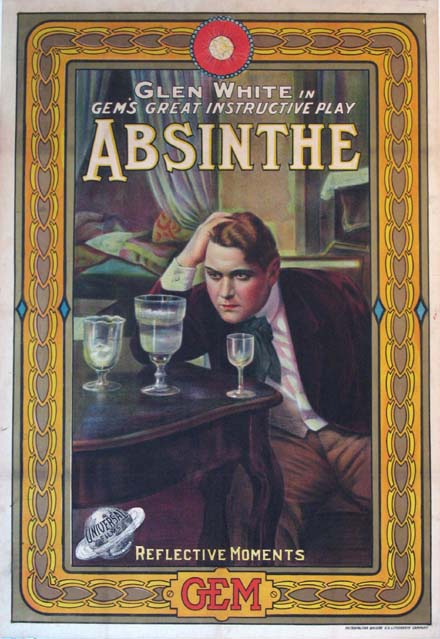
- White featured on theater poster for the 1913 film Absinthe
- Born: June 13, 1880
- Died: Unknown
- Occupation: Actor
- Years active: 1912–1921

Glen White (June 13, 1880 – ?) was an American actor. He appeared in 50 films between 1912 and 1921.

== Selected filmography ==
- Bob's Baby (1913)
- Absinthe (1913)
- The $5,000,000 Counterfeiting Plot (1914)
- The Flaming Sword (1915)
- Romeo and Juliet (1916)
- The Straight Way (1916)
- Camille (1917)
- Heart and Soul (1917)
- Her Greatest Love (1917)
- The Tiger Woman (1917)
- The Darling of Paris (1917)
