= L'apache =

1919 film

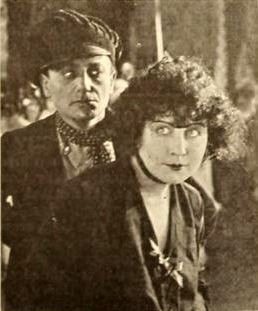
- Macey Harlam and Dorothy Dalton in the film
- Directed by: Joe De Grasse
- Screenplay by: Adele Buffington; John Lynch; R. Cecil Smith
- Produced by: Thomas H. Ince
- Starring: Dorothy Dalton; Robert Elliott; Macey Harlam; Austin Webber; George Furry; Frank Cluxon; Alice Gale
- Cinematography: John Stumar
- Edited by: W. Duncan Mansfield
- Production companies: Thomas H. Ince Corporation; Famous Players–Lasky Corporation
- Distributed by: Paramount Pictures
- Release date: November 2, 1919
- Running time: 60 minutes
- Country: United States
- Language: Silent (English intertitles)

L'apache is a 1919 American silent drama film directed by Joe De Grasse and written by Adele Buffington in her first screenplay, John Lynch, and R. Cecil Smith. The film stars Dorothy Dalton, Robert Elliott, Macey Harlam, Austin Webber, George Furry, Frank Cluxon, and Alice Gale. The film was released on November 2, 1919, by Paramount Pictures. It is not known whether the film currently survives.

== Cast ==
- Dorothy Dalton as Natalie 'La Bourget' Bourget / Helen Armstrong
- Robert Elliott as Otis Mayne
- Macey Harlam as Jean Bourget
- Austin Webber as Harrison Forbes
- George Furry as Professor Armstrong
- Frank Cluxon as Tom Gordon
- Alice Gale as Jane
- Louis Darclay as The Mouse
- Clara Beyers as Zelie

== See also ==
- Apaches (subculture)
