= Owen Kildare =

American novelist

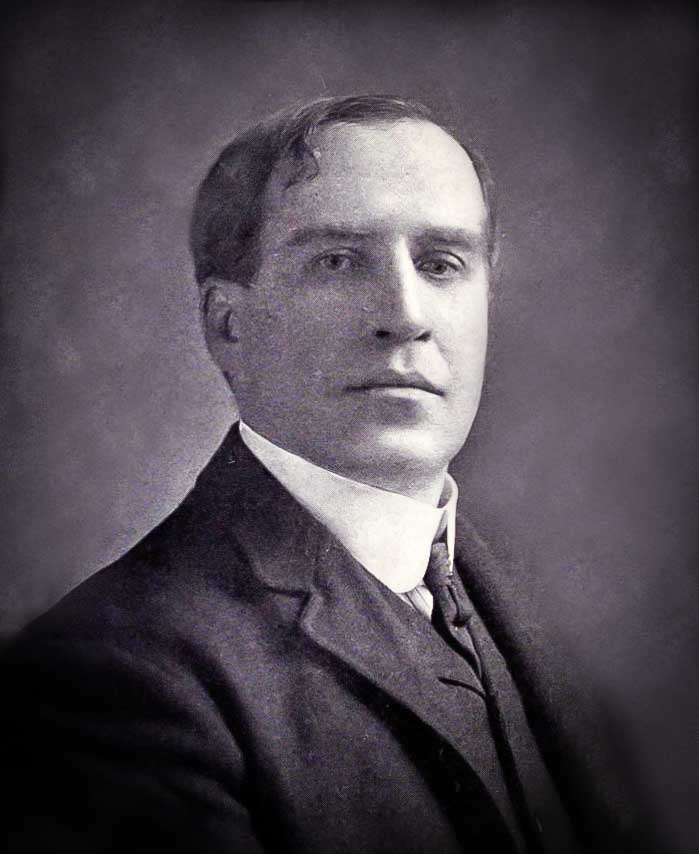
- Kildare in 1903
- Born: June 11, 1864; Manhattan, New York, U.S.
- Died: February 4, 1911 (aged 46); Manhattan, New York, U.S.
- Education: Night school at Cooper Union
- Spouse: Leita Russell Bogartus
- Writing career
- Years active: 1897–1908
- Genre: Zolaesque realism
- Subject: Life in the Bowery

Owen Frawley Kildare (June 11, 1864 – February 4, 1911) was an American writer active in the early 20th century. His short stories and novels described the grim realities of life in a New York City slum. Often heard to comment that he was "born in the gutter", he was known as "the Mr. Bounderby of American Letters" and "the Kipling of the Bowery".

== Early life ==
Kildare was born on New York's Lower East Side in 1864. His father, an Irish immigrant, died three months before his birth; his mother, a French immigrant, died soon after his birth. He was raised by a foster family until the age of seven when he began life on his own. He began living his independent life after his foster father drunkenly threw him out of the brothel for daring to ask for a pair of shoes in winter, which his foster mother gave him, despite his father's protests, but he did not comply with the stipulation that from then on he would bring home two buckets of coal instead of one per day after the usual full-day of prowling. He then sold newspapers (as a newsie) on a crew managed by Timothy Sullivan. He could not read or write until he was 30 years old.

== Alternate early biography ==
During Kildare's life, The New York Times suggested that his name was a pseudonym. Then in one of Kildare's obituaries, The Times printed a conversation with "Red" Shaughnessy, a regular at "The Doctor's Bar" in the Bowery, who claimed that Kildare was really Thomas Carroll. According to Shaughnessy, Carroll had been born in Carrollton, Maryland, into a branch of the influential Carroll family. He ran away from home and became a newspaper hawker and fighter, preferring a tough life in the Bowery to that in a comfortable Baltimore suburb. The Literary Digest suggested that the alternate details might be the work of a clever newspaper writer.

== Later life ==
Kildare began earning money as a prize fighter, and later he became a bouncer and a bartender in the Bowery. In 1901 he participated in a failed coup to depose Venezuelan dictator Cipriano Castro, and after returning to New York he wrote short stories for magazines and newspapers. He became an associate editor of Pearson's Magazine and later started the short-lived Kildare Publishing Company.

Two women in his life helped Kildare in his writing. A teacher named Marie Rose Deering tutored Kildare while he was learning to read and write. The two became engaged, but Deering died a week before their marriage. Kildare then met Leita Russell Bogartus, a writer who helped him edit and publish some of his work. He later married Bogartus.

== Death ==
Kildare and playwright Walter Hackett adapted My Mamie Rose, Kildare's first major work and autobiography, for the stage in 1908, starring actor Arnold Daly. The production was entitled Regeneration, and Kildare became angry and despondent after seeing Daly's interpretation of his character. Then after a fall in the subway, Kildare suffered a mental breakdown. He was placed in Bellevue Psychiatric Hospital and later moved to Bloomingdale Insane Asylum. From the time of his hospitalization in 1908 until his death, he would not leave the psychiatric hospital system. He died after a seizure in 1911 at the Manhattan Psychiatric Center.

== Major works ==
- My Mamie Rose (Baker and Taylor Co., 1903)
- The Good of the Wicked (Baker and Taylor Co., 1904)
- The Wisdom of the simple (Fleming H. Revell Co., 1905)
- My Old Bailiwick (Grosset and Dunlap Co., 1906)

== Film ==
My Mamie Rose was adapted by Raoul Walsh for the silent film Regeneration in 1915.
