= Man and His Woman =

1920 film

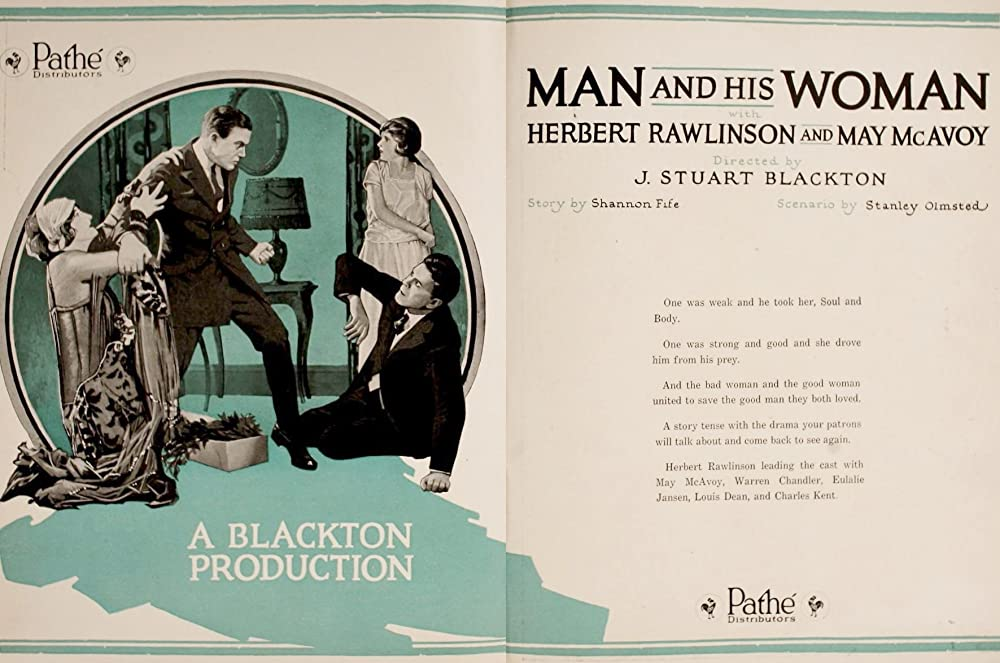
- Directed by: J. Stuart Blackton
- Written by: Shannon Fife; Stanley Olmstead
- Starring: Herbert Rawlinson; Eulalie Jensen; May McAvoy
- Cinematography: William S. Adams
- Production company: J. Stuart Blackton Feature Pictures
- Distributed by: Pathé Exchange
- Release date: July 18, 1920
- Running time: 60 minutes
- Country: United States
- Languages: Silent; English intertitles

Man and His Woman is a 1920 American silent drama film directed by J. Stuart Blackton and starring Herbert Rawlinson, Eulalie Jensen and May McAvoy.

== Cast ==
- Herbert Rawlinson as Dr. John Worthing
- Eulalie Jensen as Claire Eaton
- May McAvoy as Eve Cartier
- Warren Chandler as Hugh Conway
- Louis Dean as Dr. Elliot
- Charles Kent as The Stranger

== Bibliography ==
- Connelly, Robert B. The Silents: Silent Feature Films, 1910-36, Volume 40, Issue 2. December Press, 1998.
