= The Common Cause (film) =

1919 film by J. Stuart Blackton

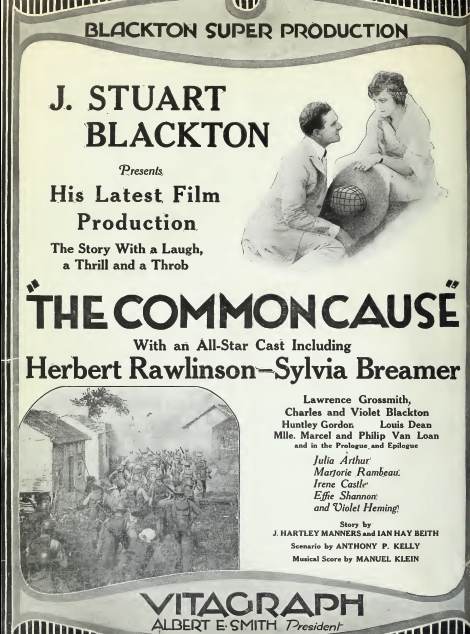
- Advertisement
- Directed by: J. Stuart Blackton
- Written by: Anthony Paul Kelly
- Based on: play, Getting Together, by Ian Hay, J. Hartley Manners, and Percival Knight
- Produced by: J. Stuart Blackton
- Starring: Effie Shannon; Irene Castle; Marjorie Rambeau
- Cinematography: George Brautigan
- Production company: J. Stuart Blackton Feature Pictures
- Distributed by: Vitagraph Company of America
- Release date: January 5, 1919
- Running time: 7 reels
- Country: United States
- Language: Silent (English intertitles)

The Common Cause is a lost 1919 American silent comedy film directed and produced by J. Stuart Blackton and distributed by Vitagraph Company of America. It is based on a play, Getting Together, by Ian Hay, J. Hartley Manners, and Percival Knight.

== Plot ==
As described in a film magazine, Helene Palmer (Breamer) is estranged from her husband Orrin (Rawlinson) due to the attentions paid to her by a man about town. After the United States enters World War I, she takes up war work and pleads with men from all walks of life on the steps of the New York City public library to enlist. Her husband joins his company and goes abroad, and she induces her male friend to also join the colors. She then goes to France where she ministers to the sick and destitute. The Germans invade the town and she remains behind with those too ill to be moved. A German officer goes to her room and is about to assault her when the American troops arrive, and she is saved by her husband. There is a reconciliation between them. The film has a prologue where actresses representing Britannia, Italy, and the United States answer the call of Belgium and France, and the film ends with an epilogue with a "league of nations" tableau.

== Cast ==
- Effie Shannon as Belgium (prologue)
- Irene Castle as France (prologue)
- Violet Heming as Britannia (prologue)
- Julia Arthur as Italy (prologue)
- Marjorie Rambeau as Columbia (prologue)
- Herbert Rawlinson as Orrin Palmer
- Sylvia Breamer as Helene Palmer
- Huntley Gordon as Edward Wadsworth
- Lawrence Grossmith as Tommy Atkins
- Charles Stuart Blackton as Little Belgian Refugee
- Violet Virginia Blackton as Little Belgian Refugee
- Philip Van Loan as The Poilu
- Marcelle Carroll as French Girl (credited as Mlle. Marcel)
- Louis Dean as German General
