= Regeneration (1915 film) =

1915 film by Raoul Walsh

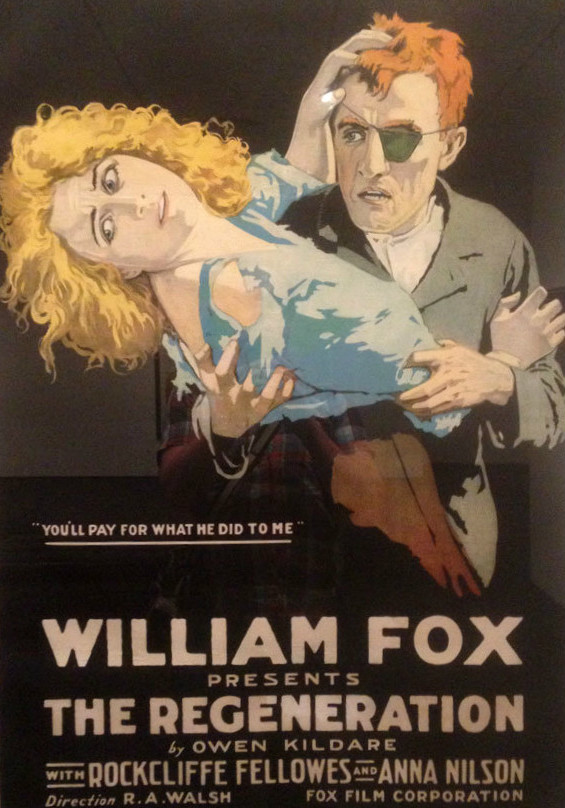
- Original theatrical poster, 1915
- Directed by: Raoul Walsh
- Written by: Carl Harbaugh (adaptation); Raoul Walsh (adaptation)
- Based on: My Mamie Rose by Owen Frawley Kildare The Regeneration by Walter Hackett and Owen Frawley Kildare
- Produced by: William Fox
- Starring: Rockliffe Fellowes; Anna Q. Nilsson; James A. Marcus; Carl Harbaugh
- Cinematography: Georges Benoît
- Distributed by: Fox Film Corporation
- Release date: September 13, 1915
- Running time: 72 minutes
- Country: United States
- Languages: Silent film English intertitles

Regeneration (alternately called The Regeneration) is a 1915 American silent biographical crime drama co-written and directed by Raoul Walsh. The film, which was the first full-length feature film directed by Walsh, stars Rockliffe Fellowes and Anna Q. Nilsson and was adapted for the screen by Carl Harbaugh and Walsh from the 1903 memoir My Mamie Rose, by Owen Frawley Kildare and the adapted 1908 play by Kildare and Walter Hackett.

It was feared lost until a copy was located by the film preservationist David Shepard, who sent it to the Museum of Modern Art.

== Premise ==
Cited as one of the first full-length gangster films, Regeneration tells the story of a poor orphan who rises to control the mob until he meets a woman for whom he wants to change.

The film is a "candid adaptation" of the autobiography of Owen Frawley Kildare, called the Kipling of the Bowery. The story follows the life of Owen, a young Irish American boy who is forced into a life of poverty after his mother dies. As a result, Owen is forced to live on the street eventually turning to a life of crime. Owen is eventually reformed, however, by the benevolent social worker Marie Deering. Also featured is a fire aboard an excursion ferry, much like the General Slocum disaster of 1904.

Deering's choices perplex her beau, a district attorney who has declared war on the gangs.

== Cast ==
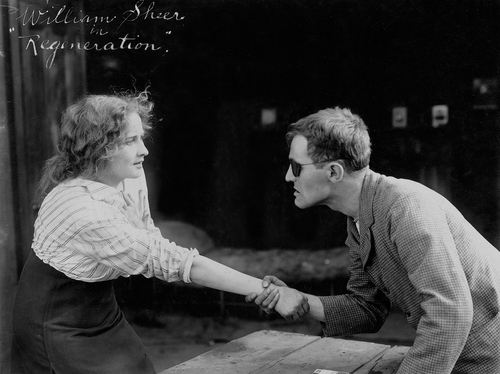
Anna Q. Nilsson and William Sheer

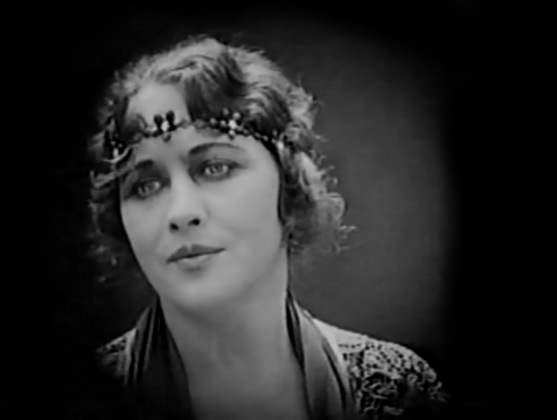
Anna Q. Nilsson as Marie "Mamie Rose" Deering

- Rockliffe Fellowes – Owen Conway
- James A. Marcus – Jim Conway
- Anna Q. Nilsson – Marie "Mamie Rose" Deering
- Maggie Weston – Maggie Conway
- William Sheer – Skinny
- Carl Harbaugh – District Attorney Ames
- John McCann – Owen Conway (10 years old)
- Harry McCoy – Owen Conway (17 years old)

== Production ==
Set in New York City, Regeneration was shot on location in New York City's Lower East Side and used real prostitutes, gangsters, and homeless people as extras. It is the first produced by Fox Film Corporation, a forerunner of the 20th Century Fox.

By 1915, 28-year-old director Raoul Walsh was in New York, with a three-picture contract with Fox Film Corporation for $400 a week—he was assigned Regeneration, to be the first feature-length gangster film in the United States. It was based on the book My Mamie Rose. Walsh's statement that he wrote the script was contradicted by other comments he made that he worked on it with Carl Harbaugh. Walsh had previously played John Wilkes Booth in The Birth of a Nation, and this was his first directing project on a feature, with him going on to film 140 other feature films.

When he filmed the scene with actors jumping off a boat into the river, fireboats and police showed up to calm the "crowds", and Walsh was taken to the local station house, amused. The studio "relished" the free publicity. French cinematographer Georges Benoit worked on the film as his first Fox picture.

== Release ==
Regeneration (1915)

Regeneration was originally released on September 13, 1915, to critical acclaim and was a box office hit. It was re-released to theaters on January 12, 1919.

The release was "rife with the dramatic elements that pleased broad audiences of early cinema—violence and redemption, heavy sentiment, romance and tragedy". It opened to critical and box-office success. William Fox was so pleased, he bought Walsh a Simplex automobile and afforded him a salary of $800 a week, a small fortune in 1915. It cemented his reputation as an action director, although critics noted had "had a gift for revealing emotional vulnerability in even his roughest, toughest heroes."

=== Home media ===
In 2001, Regeneration was released on Region 1 DVD by Image Entertainment, along with the 1915 film Young Romance. The same two-film set was released on manufactured-on-demand DVD by Image Entertainment in 2012. The film is in the public domain.

== Legacy ==
Regeneration was previously thought to be lost but was rediscovered in the 1970s. A copy of the film is preserved and held by the Museum of Modern Art Department of Film and the Film Preservation Associates. TimeOut wrote that "intriguingly, its eventful plotline is revealed as flatly contradicting the accepted synoptic account provided by Walsh in his autobiography. There the eventual fates of Nilsson and Fellowes are reversed, and an ending is transposed from another film entirely." The Guardian says "it's a milestone in the history of the gangster film, and with its religious themes, mobile camerawork, and potent evocation of its grim locations, it's the spiritual ancestor of Martin Scorsese's Mean Streets."

Time Out says it is notable for its "remarkable approach to physical casting, a robust treatment of violent action, and a sheer narrative pace to shame contemporary ponderousness."

In 2000, Regeneration was selected for preservation in the United States National Film Registry by the Library of Congress as being "culturally, historically or aesthetically significant".
