= The Tides of Fate =

1917 film by Marshall Parker Farnum

- Directed by: Marshall Farnum
- Written by: Kate Jordan
- Produced by: William A. Brady
- Starring: William Sheer; Charles E. Graham
- Production company: Equitable Motion Pictures Corporation
- Distributed by: World Film
- Release date: September 3, 1917
- Running time: 5 reels
- Country: United States
- Languages: Silent; English intertitles

The Tides of Fate is a 1917 American silent drama film directed by Marshall Farnum and starring William Sheer and Charles E. Graham. Location shooting took place in Cuba while river scenes were shot on the Schoharie Creek in Gilboa, NY.

== Cast ==
- Alexandria Carlisle as Fanny Lawson
- Frank Holland as John Cross
- William Sheer as Stephen King
- Charles E. Graham as Fergus McManus
- Jane Kent as Claudia Nelson
- Walter Ryder as Azray Heath

== Bibliography ==
- Brent E. Walker. Mack Sennett’s Fun Factory: A History and Filmography of His Studio and His Keystone and Mack Sennett Comedies, with Biographies of Players and Personnel. McFarland, 2013.
