= Dawn of Revenge =

1922 silent film

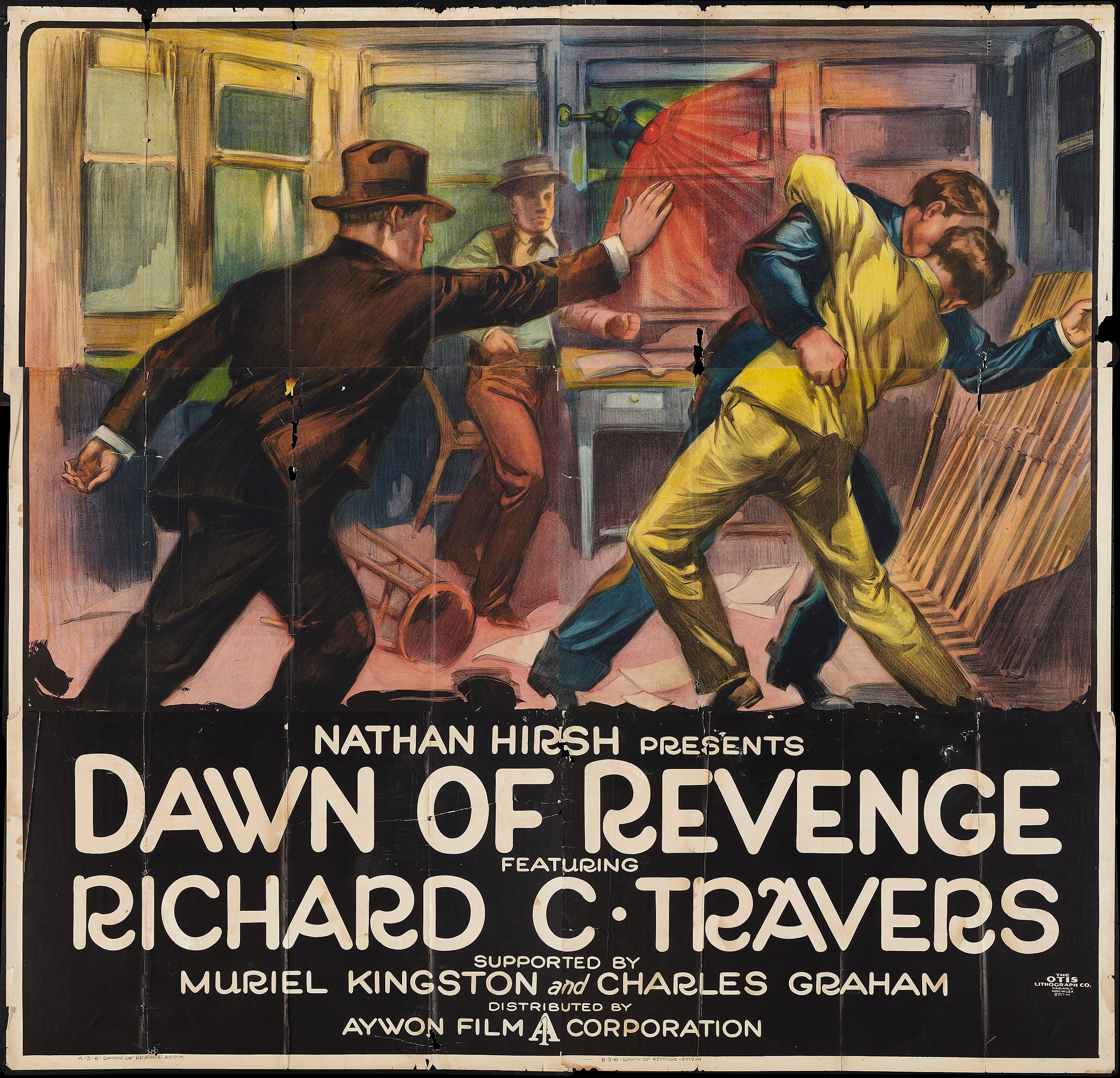
- Directed by: Bernard Sievel
- Produced by: Nathan Hirsh
- Starring: Richard Travers; Muriel Kingston; Charles E. Graham
- Production company: Charles E. Bartlett Productions
- Distributed by: Aywon Film Corporation
- Release date: October 1, 1922
- Running time: 50 minutes
- Country: United States
- Languages: Silent; English intertitles

Dawn of Revenge is a 1922 American silent drama film directed by Bernard Sievel and starring Richard Travers, Muriel Kingston and Charles E. Graham.

== Cast ==
- Richard Travers as Judson Hall
- Muriel Kingston as Sherry Miles
- Charles E. Graham as Ace Hall
- Florence Foster as Alice Blake Miles
- Louis Dean as Nelson Miles
- May Daggert as Baba

== Bibliography ==
- Munden, Kenneth White. The American Film Institute Catalog of Motion Pictures Produced in the United States, Part 1. University of California Press, 1997.
