= The Charge of the Gauchos =

1928 film by Albert H. Kelley

- Directed by: Albert H. Kelley
- Written by: W.C. Clifford; Garrett Graham; Julián Ajuria
- Produced by: Julián Ajuria
- Starring: Francis X. Bushman; Jacqueline Logan; Guido Trento; Paul Ellis
- Cinematography: Georges Benoît; Nicholas Musuraca
- Edited by: George Nichols Jr.
- Production company: Ajuria Productions
- Distributed by: Sociedad General Cinematográfica; Film Booking Offices of America
- Release dates: March 10, 1928 (Argentina); September 16, 1928 (U.S.)
- Countries: Argentina; United States
- Languages: Silent; Spanish / English intertitles

The Charge of the Gauchos (Argentine title: Una nueva y gloriosa nación) is a 1928 American-Argentine silent historical film directed by Albert H. Kelley and starring Francis X. Bushman, Jacqueline Logan, and Guido Trento. Bushman plays Manuel Belgrano, one of the leaders of the 1810 May Revolution. The film's Spanish title refers to a line from the Argentine national anthem. It was made as a patriotic endeavor designed to boost the small Argentine film industry, but with enough action and romance to appeal to international audiences particularly in the UK and the United States. The film was also released under the title The Beautiful Spy.

== Plot ==
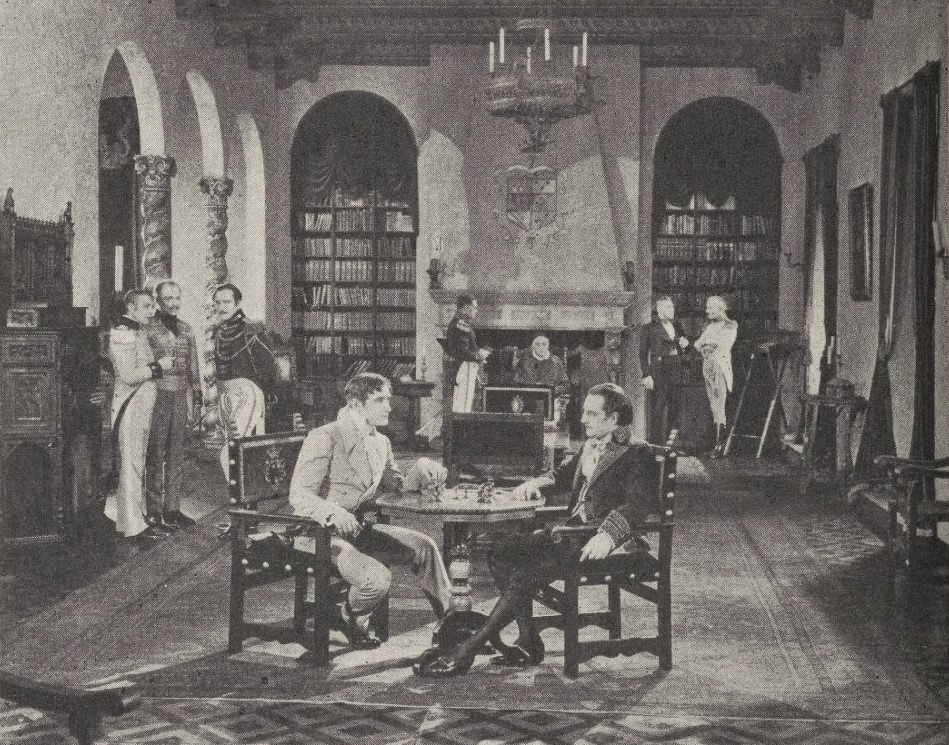

General Manuel Belgrano (Bushman) is leading a military campaign against Spanish rule. His sweetheart, Monica (Logan), the daughter of a Spanish loyalist, is acting as a spy and supplying information. Monica is captured and sentenced to be executed. Belgrano has to rally his supporters to free her.

== Cast ==
- Francis X. Bushman as Manuel Belgrano
- Jacqueline Logan as Monica Salazar
- Guido Trento as Monteros
- Paul Ellis as Balcarce
- Henry Kolker as Viceroy Cisneros
- Charles Hill Mailes as Saavedra
- Jack Hopkins as Lezica
- Charles K. French as Salazar
- Olive Hasbrouck as Mariana
- Mathilde Comont as Aunt Rosita
- Jack Ponder as George Gordon
- Lige Conley as Gómez
- Gino Corrado as Moreno
- Frank Hagney as Goyeneche
- Otto Hoffman as Balcarce's Father
- Margaret McWade as Balcarce's Mother
- James Gordon as Bishop
- Serge Tatarski as Castelli
- Henry Hebert as Martin Rodriguez
- Harry Semels as Beruti
- Elmer Dewey as French
- Curt Furburg as Patriot

== Production ==
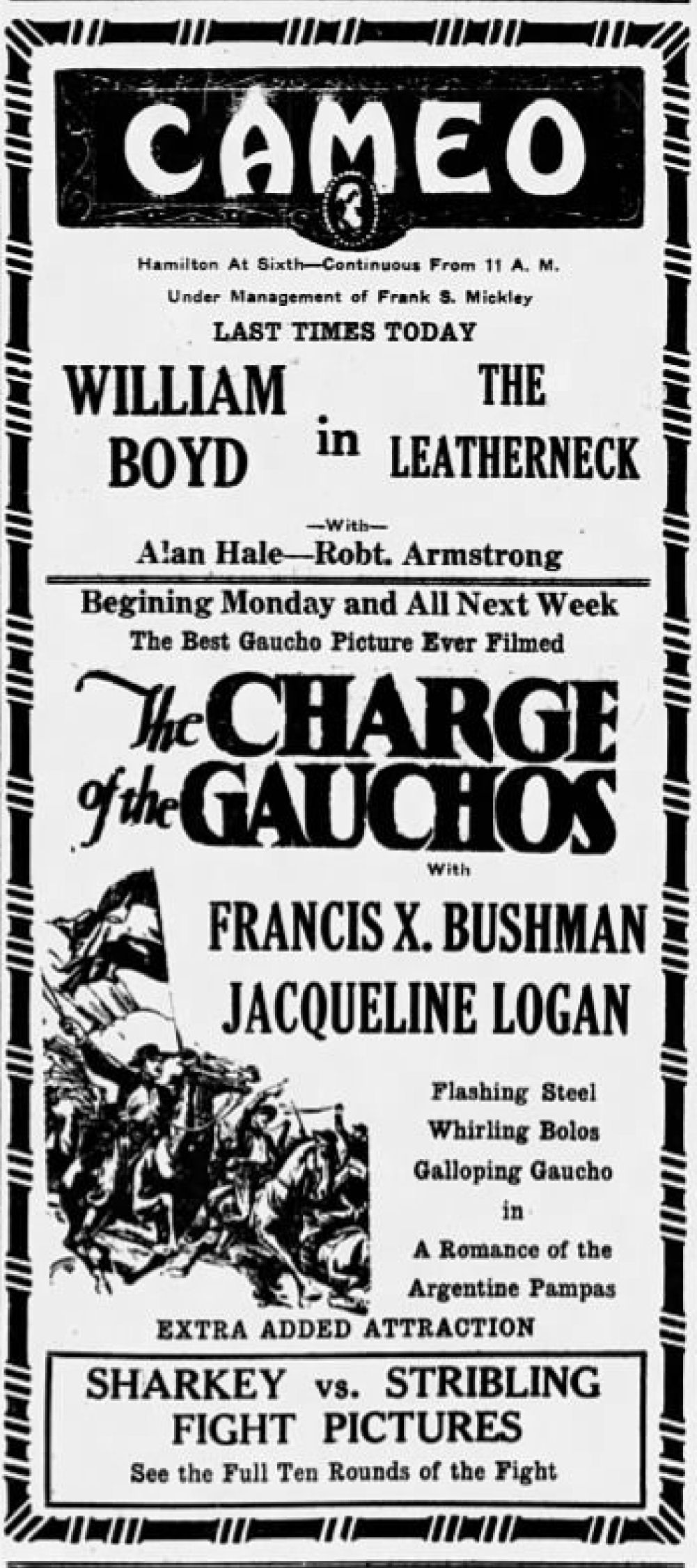
1929 newspaper advertisement

The Spanish-born Argentine producer Julián Ajuria was unhappy with previous representations of Argentina in Hollywood films. After failing to secure Hollywood backing for his project, he raised the finances elsewhere but decided to shoot in North America with a largely American cast in order to boost the film's chances of a good release there. Bushman had been a major star during the silent era, although his career was starting to decline.

Ajuria went to great lengths to recreate authentic costumes and settings of the period. During its production, the film was criticized by Argentine newspapers who felt that it would be another Hollywood-style retelling of Argentina's history, but these attitudes began to change once preview screenings were held.

== Release ==
The film premiered on March 10, 1928 at the Cervantes Theatre in Buenos Aires. It went on release in the United States in September the same year, distributed by FBO which shortly afterwards merged into the major RKO Pictures. The running time of the film was significantly cut down, and it was generally shown as part of a double bill. It was not successful, partly due to the arrival of sound which made silent films noncommercial. However, in Argentina it was exceptionally popular, and remained in release for two whole years. It was the most popular silent film ever released in the country. Ajuria's hope that it would stimulate the creation of an Argentinian film industry, but this did not immediately happen.

== Preservation ==
The Charge of the Gauchos was for many years considered a lost film, until its rediscovery and screening in 2013.

== Bibliography ==
- Finkielman, Jorge. The Film Industry in Argentina: An Illustrated Cultural History. McFarland, 2003.
