= Wright Lorimer =

American stage actor and playwright

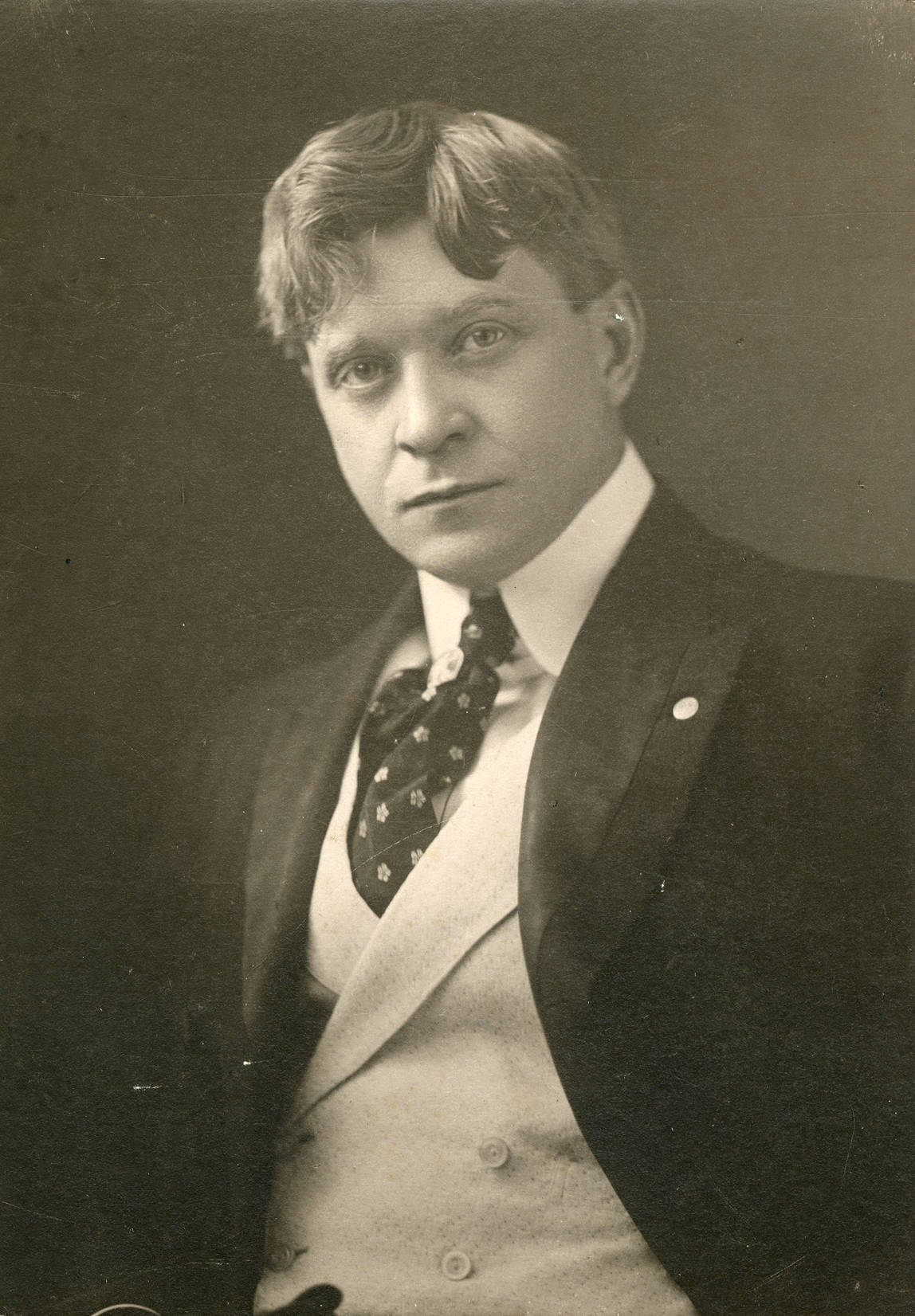
- Born: Walter Myron Smith; March 10, 1874; Worcester, Massachusetts, U.S.
- Died: December 22, 1911 (aged 37); New York City, U.S.
- Other name: Walter M. S. Lowell
- Occupations: Actor, Playwright
- Years active: 1899-1911
- Spouse: Kittie L. Lorimer (née Kate Purdy)
- Children: 3

Wright Lorimer (March 10, 1874 – December 22, 1911) was the stage name of Walter Myron Smith, an American stage actor and playwright who was also known as Walter M. S. Lowell. He was author of a famous religious play The Shepherd King (1904) and starred in the Broadway production playing David. The play was co-written with Arnold Reeves. Lorimer committed suicide in 1911 despondent over a contract and proceeds of The Shepherd King with producer William A. Brady.

In 1923 The Shepherd King was made into an extravagant religious film by Fox Film Corporation. It was shot in several countries and released in direct competition with Cecil B. DeMille's religious spectacular The Ten Commandments.

== See also ==
- Wilson Barrett
