= Headin' Home =

1920 film by Lawrence Clement Windom

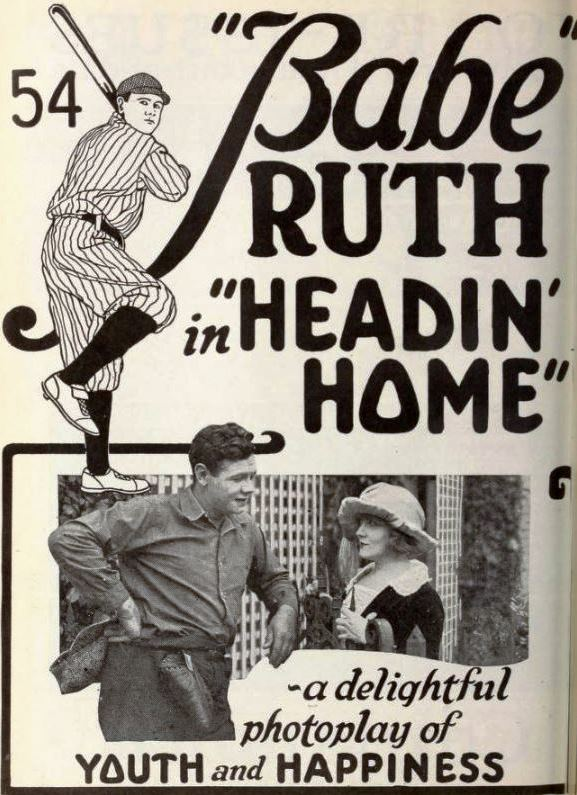
- Advertisement
- Directed by: Lawrence C. Windom
- Written by: Arthur "Bugs" Baer; Earle Browne (story)
- Produced by: William Shea (producer); Herbert H. Yudkin (producer)
- Starring: See below
- Cinematography: Ollie Leach
- Production companies: Kessel & Baumann
- Distributed by: Yankee Photo Corporation
- Release date: September 19, 1920
- Running time: 55 minutes
- Country: United States
- Language: Silent (English intertitles)

Headin' Home

Headin' Home is a 1920 American silent biopic sports film directed by Lawrence C. Windom. It attempts to create a mythology surrounding the life of baseball player Babe Ruth.

The screenplay was written by Arthur "Bugs" Baer from a story by Earle Browne. Besides Ruth, it stars Ruth Taylor, William Sheer, and Margaret Seddon.

== Plot summary ==
Ruth stars in the film, playing himself, but the details of his life are completely fictionalized. In the film, Ruth comes from a small country town and has a loving home life, but in real life, he grew up in Baltimore, Maryland, and spent most of his childhood in a reformatory.

In the film, shades of the 1984 baseball movie The Natural, Ruth cuts down a tree to make his own bat. The final scenes depict Ruth as a member of the New York Yankees, with footage recognizable as the Polo Grounds, the Yankees' home field at the time.

== Cast ==
- Babe Ruth as Babe
- Ruth Taylor as Mildred Tobin
- William Sheer as Harry Knight
- Margaret Seddon as Babe's Mother
- Frances Victory as Pigtails
- James A. Marcus as Simon Tobin
- Ralf Harolde as John Tobin
- Charles Byer as David Talmadge
- George Halpin as Doc Hedges / The Constable / Dog Catcher
- William J. Gross as Eliar Lott
- Walter Lawrence as Tony Marino
- Ann Brody as Mrs. Tony Marino
- Ricca Allen as Almira Worters
- Sammy Blum as Jimbo Jones
- Ethel Kerwin as Kitty Wilson
- Tom Cameron as Deacon Flack
- Charles J. Hunt as Reverend David Talmadge
- William Shea
- Raoul Walsh as supervisor

== See also ==
- Babe Comes Home (1927), also starring Babe Ruth
- List of baseball films
