= Romeo and Juliet (1916 Fox film) =

1916 film directed by J. Gordon Edwards

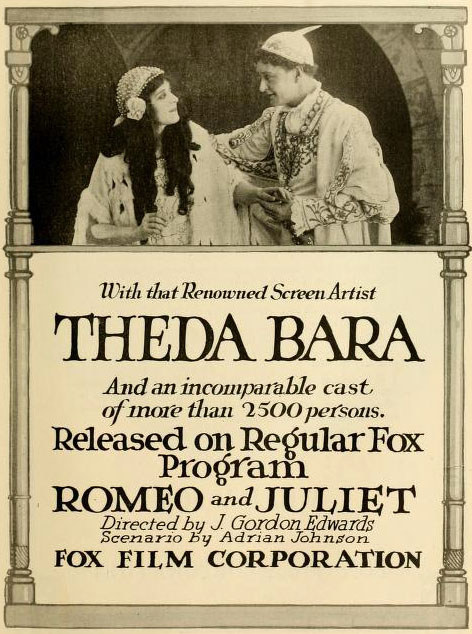
- Film poster
- Directed by: J. Gordon Edwards
- Written by: Adrian Johnson
- Based on: Romeo and Juliet; 1597 play by William Shakespeare
- Produced by: William Fox
- Starring: Theda Bara; Harry Hilliard
- Cinematography: Phil Rosen
- Edited by: Alfred DeGaetano
- Distributed by: Fox Film Corporation
- Release date: October 22, 1916
- Running time: 70 minutes
- Country: United States
- Languages: Silent; English intertitles

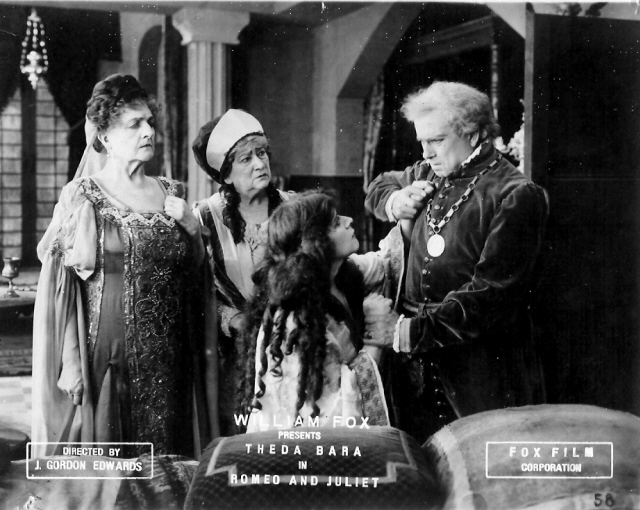
Bara (center, seated) in a scene from the film

Romeo and Juliet is a 1916 American silent romantic drama film directed by J. Gordon Edwards and starring Theda Bara. The film was based on Shakespeare's Romeo and Juliet and was produced by the Fox Film Corporation. The film was shot at the Fox Studio in Fort Lee, New Jersey, and is now considered to be lost.

== Competing versions of Shakespeare ==
This film and other Shakespeare-oriented pictures were released in 1916, the 300th anniversary of William Shakespeare's death. This film went up against direct competition from another feature-length Romeo and Juliet film from Metro Pictures starring Francis X. Bushman and Beverly Bayne.

In a recorded interview, Bushman states that William Fox had spies working for Metro, and stole some of the intertitles from the Metro version. Fox rushed his version into the theatres in order to capitalize on exhibiting his film first. Bushman recalled going to see Fox's Romeo and Juliet and was startled to see the intertitles from his film flash on the screen.

== Cast ==
- Theda Bara as Juliet
- Harry Hilliard as Romeo
- Glen White as Mercutio
- Walter Law as Friar Laurence
- John Webb Dillion as Tybalt
- Einar Linden as Paris
- Elwin Eaton as Montague
- Alice Gale as Nurse
- Helen Tracy as Lady Capulet
- Victory Bateman as Lady Montague
- Jane Lee
- Katherine Lee
- May De Lacy
- Edward Holt as Capulet

== See also ==
- Romeo and Juliet on screen
- List of lost films
- 1937 Fox vault fire
