= Virginia Tracy =

American novelist (1874–1946)

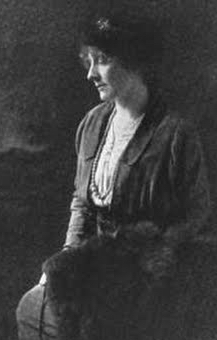
- Virginia Tracy, from a 1915 publication.
- Born: 1874; New York City, U.S.
- Died: March 4, 1946 (aged 71–72); New York City, U.S.
- Occupations: Actress, writer
- Years active: 1890s–1930s
- Parent(s): John McCullough; Helen Tracy (mother)

Virginia Tracy (1874 – March 4, 1946) was an American adventurer, stage actress, novelist and screenwriter. In the newspaper world she wrote primarily for the New York Tribune.

== Biography ==
She was the daughter of Victorian actress Helen Tracy (1850–1924). and Shakespearean actor John McCullough.

At 20, in 1894, she wrote one of her first professional reports after accompanying a caravan of actors led by Maurice Barrymore traveling cross country on train. In the 1920s she wrote several large scale epics for the Fox Film Corporation.

Tracy's Broadway credits as an actress included Escape This Night (1938), Sweet Mystery of Life (1935), Post Road (1934), Jig Saw (1934), And Be My Love, (1934), Lone Valley (1933), Bulls, Bears and Asses (1932), Wild Waves (1932), and Up York State (1901).

On March 4, 1946, Tracy died in New York City. She apparently had never married.

== Works ==
- Merely Players: The Stories of Stage Life (1909)
- Persons Unknown (1914)
- Starring Dulcy Jayne (1927)
- Moment After (1930)
- The Personal Appearance of a Lioness (1937)

== Filmography ==
- The Queen of Sheba (1921)
- Nero (1922)
- The Shepherd King (1923)
- The Net (1924)
