= Alice Gale =

American actress

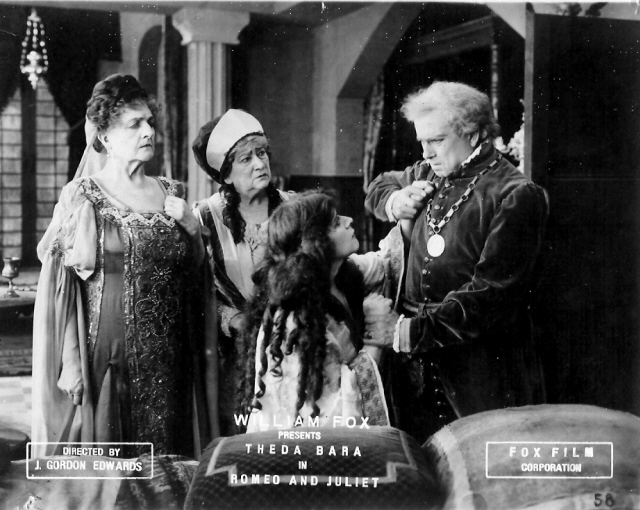
- From Romeo and Juliet (1916). Standing from left, Helen Tracy (Lady Capulet), Alice Gale (Nurse), and Edward Holt (Capulet). Seated: Theda Bara as Juliet.
- Born: December 5, 1858; Philadelphia, Pennsylvania
- Died: March 27, 1941 (aged 82); Harrisburg, Pennsylvania
- Occupation: film actress
- Years active: 1916–1919

Alice Gale (5 December 1858 – 27 March 1941) was an American actress.

== Biography ==
Working with stock theater troupes such as the Grand Stock Company, the Girard Stock Company, and Creston Clarke's company, Gale performed on stage for four decades before making her first film, Sins of Men (1916). She appeared in 11 films between 1916 and 1919, of which only two survive.

Gale was born in Philadelphia, Pennsylvania, and died in Harrisburg, Pennsylvania.

== Filmography ==
- L'apache (1919) *Lost film
- The Birth of a Race (1918)
- Magda (1917)
- Camille (1917) *Lost film
- To-Day (1917) *Lost film
- Heart and Soul (1917) *Lost film
- Her Greatest Love (1917) *Lost film
- The New York Peacock (1917) *Lost film
- The Darling of Paris (1917) *Lost film
- Romeo and Juliet (1916) *Lost film
- Sins of Men (1916)
