= Jig Saw (play) =

1933 play by Dawn Powell

- Original language: English
- Written by: Dawn Powell
- Subject: Interwoven relationships
- Genre: Comedy
- Setting: NYC hotel penthouse drawing room and terrace

Premiere
- Date: April 30, 1934
- Place: Ethel Barrymore Theatre
- Directed by: Philip Moeller

Jig Saw is a 1933 play by Dawn Powell. It is a three-act comedy with two settings and twelve characters. The story concerns a divorcée, kept by a married man, who loses a young man she picked up in a hotel to her daughter.

The play was produced by the Theatre Guild when another play failed in tryout. It was staged by Philip Moeller, had sets by Lee Simonson, and starred Ernest Truex and Spring Byington, with Cora Witherspoon, Gertrude Flynn, and Eliot Cabot in support. It had a tryout in Washington, D.C., just four weeks after the Theatre Guild decided to mount the play and began pulling the production together. The Broadway premiere for Jig Saw came a week after the tryout, in late April 1934. It ran through early June 1934, with a common critical opinion being that only the first act worked.

The play was never revived on Broadway, nor adapted for other media, though Paramount Studios had a financial stake in it. After Gore Vidal and Tim Page aroused interest in Dawn Powell's writings in the late 1980s, an off-Broadway production was mounted in 2001.

== Characters ==
Characters are listed in order of appearance within their scope.

Lead

- Del Marsh is 45, an attorney, Claire's on-again off-again of 15 years, who pays the rent for the penthouse.
- Claire Burnell is pretty and charming, in her late thirties, divorced, a kept woman with a penchant for younger men.

Supporting

- Mrs. Letty Walters is 38, attractive, Claire's acidic friend and fellow connoisseur of brief romances.
- Nathan Gifford is 30, a sometime writer for magazines, who Claire picked up at a wedding they both crashed.
- Julie Burnell is 18, Claire's plain daughter, just returned from a Paris convent school.

Featured

- Rosa is Claire's long-suffering elderly maid, who begrudges a tip for the porter and bell boy.
- Porter brings in Julie's trunks for Rosa, and a cot for Del, but only gets a tip from the latter.
- Bell Boy helps the porter.
- Frank Mason is 40, a wealthy playwright and philandering husband, occasionally involved with Letty.
- Mrs. Finch is Claire's neighbor, a fortune teller, who only appears for a few minutes in the last act.
- Ethel Mason is Frank's wife, who also has only a minute or two in the last act.
- Isadore Simpson is Frank's ghostwriting collaborator, who has even less time on stage than Ethel.

Off Stage

- Margaret Marsh is Del's wife of twenty years back in Baltimore.
- Bert Walters is Letty's physician husband back in Evanston, Illinois with their children.
- Mr. Burnell is Julie's father in Port Washington, New York, now remarried.
- Elizabeth Finch is Mrs. Finch's 15-year-old daughter, an idiot according to Julie.

== Synopsis ==
Act I (Living room of Claire's penthouse at Hotel Harwich in NYC, a late spring afternoon.) Letty drops in to see Claire, but settles for the glass and bottle of gin Rosa brings her. Claire met Julie at the dock, but turned her over to Mr. Burnell for a shopping trip, and has since vanished. Del Marsh shows up with a suitcase, to be scolded by Letty on account of Julie's homecoming. He leaves to find a cot to sleep on the terrace. Claire returns in the throes of early love. She has a met another young man and given him her penthouse key, in lieu of a calling card. The door of the penthouse opens, and in comes Nathan Gifford, the young man. Letty is sent to fetch cocktails while Claire and Nathan gush over themselves. As they sip their drinks, Frank Mason comes in thru the terrace, dressed for sunbathing. Oblivious to his unwanted status, he grabs a cocktail and explains that his collaborator is writing the second act of a new play. Del returns, adding to the discomfort level. Claire introduces Nathan to Del as her instructor in Spanish. Del in turn introduces himself as Claire's dancing master. Julie enters; she remembers "Uncle Del" and "Uncle Frank" from childhood, but when Nathan proclaims himself "Uncle Nate", she contradicts him. She had encountered him at a Paris restaurant while dining with her aunt. She sent a note to his table and a photo the next day. Prompted, Nathan recalls the "schoolgirl". Claire is shocked that her daughter is as forward as herself. When asked to pass canapés to her mother's young man, Julie replies, "My young man, Uncle Del". (Curtain)

Act II (Same as Act I, three weeks later at cocktail hour.) Del and Nathan arrive at the penthouse, each having been away for a few days. Del asks Nathan how he supports himself. Nathan says every so often a relative pops off: "Fortunately my ancestors were provident souls as my descendants will have to be". Del tasks Nathan about Julie's obsession with him and learns of his uneasiness at Julie's persistence. Claire, Letty and Frank join them from the terrace. Claire is upset with Del's presence, but reminds Nathan of their plans to visit Harlem that evening. Julie's arrival puts an end to cocktails and talk of Harlem. Instead, Julie reminds Nathan of his promise to take her to midnight mass at St. Nicholas'. Claire tries to forbid Julie from going out, provoking an argument. Frank takes this as a cue to move the cocktail party to his place; he and Letty leave through the terrace, but Julie won't let Nathan leave with Claire and Del. At last alone with him, she turns on the pressure. His charm and wit, effective with older women, are useless against Julie's willpower and tears. She leads him into one concession after another: he finds her attractive, he likes her, and finally he loves her. Claire and Del return to Julie's announcement of their engagement. Another mother-daughter brawl ensues, as Nathan sneaks out. Julie leaves to look for him. Del tries to get Claire to accept the inevitable, but only provokes her into calling it quits with him. (Curtain)

Act III (Terrace of Claire's penthouse, three days later.) Frank, Letty, and Mrs. Finch are on the terrace, the latter two sitting at a garden table. On a table nearby is Claire's unfinished jigsaw puzzle. Their conversation reveals Julie and Nathan have disappeared, with Claire frantically trying find him. Rosa cautions Frank about putting his bottle of rye near the puzzle. Frank sneers: "A thousand pieces of nothing put together to make nothing", and tosses an unused piece over the terrace wall. Ethel calls to Frank from an upper balcony, so he and the two women go to join her in a rubber of bridge. Simpson steps out on the balcony for a moment, apologising to Ethel, then they both disappear inside. Nathan and Del arrive on the terrace, each surprised to see the other. Del twits Nathan for hiding from Julie, who has camped out in his apartment. But Rosa tells Del that Claire has ordered all his things tossed over the terrace wall. Julie shows up and puts the squeeze on Nathan, who finally tells her good-bye. Letty comes to commiserate with Julie, only to find her unmoved. Julie has told his apartment manager and all the newspapers that they will be married soon. She will run him down and manage him from here on out. Claire returns, and quarrels again with Julie, who is moving out to Nathan's. When she leaves, Del and Claire get into it, until he softens hers with blarney. The play ends as the bridge players come back to the terrace, with Claire leaning on Del's shoulder as he fits a piece into the jigsaw puzzle. (Curtain)

== Original production ==
=== Background ===
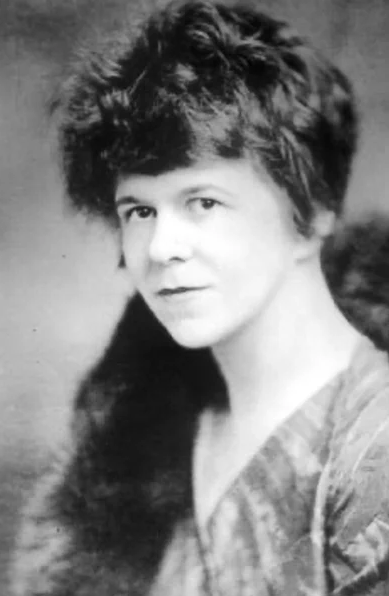
Dawn Powell 1930

This was Dawn Powell's second play to appear on Broadway. The Theatre Guild had originally held the option on Big Night, but released it to the Group Theatre, Inc., which produced it in January 1933. Big Night was withdrawn after five days and seven performances.

Powell began writing Jig Saw immediately after Big Night closed, and finished it in May 1933. Theresa Helburn purchased Jig Saw for the Theatre Guild, but the play only found its way onto the Guild's schedule when Races (Die Rassen) by Ferdinand Bruckner was withdrawn in tryout during late March 1934.

The Guild had a commitment with the Shuberts for the Ethel Barrymore Theatre from late April 1934, so the production of Jig Saw had to be thrown together quickly. They selected Spring Byington for the lead female, though she was a decade older than Powell's description of the character. They also chose Elliot Cabot (Note: The majority of reviews and publicity for this play give his first name only one "l".) who had been away from the stage for several years, and whose first tryout performance showed it.

Rehearsals began April 2, 1934, with Guild co-founder Philip Moeller as director. Within two days Ernest Truex was signed for the male lead, and the Broadway premiere announced for the end of the month. Elliot Cabot was signed next, and the tryout opening announced for April 23, 1934 in Washington, D.C. Principal casting was completed with Cora Witherspoon and Gertrude Flynn announced on April 11, 1934, while Lee Simonson was reported to be designing the sets.

=== Cast ===
Cast during the Washington, D.C. tryout and the Broadway run.
Role	Actor	Dates	Notes and sources
Del Marsh	Ernest Truex	Apr 23, 1934 - Jun 09, 1934	
Claire Burnell	Spring Byington	Apr 23, 1934 - Jun 09, 1934	
Letty Walters	Cora Witherspoon	Apr 23, 1934 - Jun 09, 1934	
Nathan Gifford	Eliot Cabot	Apr 23, 1934 - Jun 09, 1934	Reviewers were not kind to Cabot.
Julie Burnell	Gertrude Flynn	Apr 23, 1934 - Jun 09, 1934	
Rosa	Virginia Tracy	Apr 23, 1934 - Jun 09, 1934	
Porter	Albert Bergh	Apr 23, 1934 - Jun 09, 1934	
Bell Boy	James York	Apr 23, 1934 - Jun 09, 1934	
Frank Mason	Charles Richman	Apr 23, 1934 - Jun 09, 1934	
Mrs. Finch	Helen Westley	Apr 23, 1934 - Jun 02, 1934	Westley was cast when her previous Guild play closed a week before the tryout.
Mrs. Finch	Phyllis Joyce	Jun 04, 1934 - Jun 09, 1934	Joyce took over when Westley went out to Hollywood for more films.
Ethel Mason	Mabel Kroman	Apr 23, 1934 - Jun 09, 1934	
Isadore Simpson	Shepperd Strudwick	Apr 23, 1934 - Jun 09, 1934	

=== Tryout ===
Jig Saw was publicly performed for the first time at the National Theatre in Washington, D.C., on April 23, 1934. Coming less than five weeks after the work was added to the Guild's schedule, it was understandable that reviewers would take note of the production's "rough edges". It was due to the skill of director Philip Moeller and the principal cast that the play worked as well as it did. Author Dawn Powell accompanied the production to Washington, and told one interviewer that she was trying to add "five new laughs" to the second act. Reviewer Don Craig highlighted the strength and weakness of Jig Saw as the writing. The first act was front-loaded with laughs, but set too ambitious a pace, leaving dull stretches in the following acts. Mabelle Jennings expanded on this, saying the humor of the premise was thin, obvious, and worn out in the first act.

=== Broadway premiere and reception ===
The play had its Broadway premiere on April 30, 1934, at the Ethel Barrymore Theatre. Arthur Pollock called it "a harmless little farce" and said the first act was "bright and promising" but later acts would promote "ennui". He said Ernest Truex and Gertrude Flynn did well with their parts, but was severe with Elliot Cabot. He tried so hard to be charming and fascinating "that it seems certain he has St. Vitus' dance. Mr. Cabot is reprehensible". Burns Mantle said Jig Saw was "a light piece" that Dawn Powell had "spattered with snappy lines. It is both mad and merry." He felt its weakness was a straining to be scandalous. He complimented Ernest Truex, Spring Byington, Cora Witherspoon, and Gertrude Flynn, but thought Charles Richman had "no great enthusiasm for the job". He also took exception with Elliot Cabot who he said "proceeds with a pardonable uncertainty to play the young man desired of many women without being able to demonstrate any convincing reason as to why he should".

Rowland Field said Jig Saw was a delightful way to end the Guild's season. Almost alone among his reviewer colleagues, he saw no imbalance in the play's structure, saying it "is quite consistently hilarious". He was joined by Brooks Atkinson, who said "Miss Powell has a flair for breezy patter and topsy-turvey sophistication... She knows when to be daring, when to be perverse, what foibles are the most risible, and how to twist lines into laughs". Atkinson even had a compliment for Elliot Cabot, saying he plays "the part of the hounded wastrel and plays him with a sharpness that is both gauche and intelligent". Syndicated columnist Charles W. Forbes wrote "As a play, Jig Saw has too many ragged edges. The dialogue is witty and fashionably immoral".

Two weeks after the premiere, a review from The Brooklyn Citizen said the Nathan Gifford character must have been "conceived in a fit of despair", and "As a matter of fact, Miss Powell, in her two dramatic efforts to date, hasn't been able to present a single character worth turning around to meet".

=== Broadway closing ===
The play closed at the Ethel Barrymore Theatre on June 9, 1934, after just six weeks. According to Sexton and Page, the run might have continued beyond 49 performances but for a financial dispute between the Theatre Guild and the Shuberts.

== Later revivals ==
The first known revival of Jig Saw was held at Long Island University during November 1997. An Off-Broadway revival of Jig Saw was performed by The Peccadillo Theater Company at the Bank Street Theatre in Greenwich Village during March 2001.

== Bibliography ==
- Michael Sexton and Tim Page (eds), Four Plays By Dawn Powell (Steerforth Press), 1999. ISBN 9781883642617
