= William Sheer =

American actor

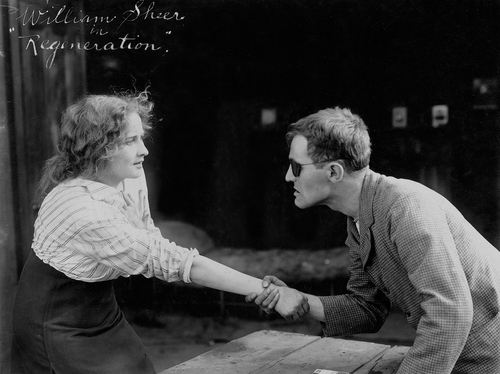
- With Anna Q. Nilsson in the 1915 film Regeneration
- Born: August 20, 1889; Birmingham, United Kingdom
- Died: July 10, 1933 (aged 43); New York City, United States
- Occupation: Actor
- Years active: 1915–1920 (film)

William Sheer (1889–1933) was a British-born American stage and film actor of the silent era.

== Selected filmography ==
- Regeneration (1915)
- Unto Those Who Sin (1916)
- The Tides of Fate (1917)
- The Sealed Envelope (1919)
- The Divorce Trap (1919)
- Pitfalls of a Big City (1919)
- Headin' Home (1920)

== Bibliography ==
- Brent E. Walker. Mack Sennett’s Fun Factory: A History and Filmography of His Studio and His Keystone and Mack Sennett Comedies, with Biographies of Players and Personnel. McFarland, 2013.
