= The $5,000,000 Counterfeiting Plot =

- Directed by: Bertram Harrison
- Starring: William J. Burns
- Production company: Dramascope Company
- Release date: September 1914
- Running time: 6 reels
- Country: United States
- Language: Silent

The $5,000,000 Counterfeiting Plot is a lost 1914 American silent film thriller directed by Bertram Harrison.

== Synopsis ==
A member of a counterfeiting gang gives a forged note to his daughter. When she spends it on a dress the note ends up in the hands of the secret service, who then bring the entire gang to justice.

== Cast ==
- William J. Burns as Himself
- Glen White as John Walton
- Joseph Sullivan as Joseph Fennell
- Cliff Saum as William Kendall
- Hector Dion as Edward Jackson
- Jack Sharkey as Frank Tyler
- William Cavanaugh as Arthur Borden
- Charles Graham as James Long
- Harry Lillford as George Peters
- James Ayling as Robert Smith
- John Ransom as John Knox
- Arthur Morrison as Charles Carruthers
- Frank Carrington as William Myers
- Henry Driscoll as Samuel Parks
- Jack Drumier as Chief of the Secret Service
- Howard Missimer as Warden of Moyamensing
- Edward Walton as Peter Miller
- Ezra Walck as Stephen Tracy
- Georgia O'Ramey as Florence Castle, Secret Service
- Jean Acker as Helen Long
- Ilean Hume as Mary Kelly
- Arthur Conan Doyle as Self

== Censorship ==
The Chicago Board of Censors rejected the film in its entirety, refusing to grant a permit. The reasons given were for the repeated scenes of counterfeiting, a government official accepting a bribe, and detectives endeavoring to induce someone to commit a crime.

== Preservation ==
With no holdings located in archives, The $5,000,000 Counterfeiting Plot is considered a lost film.
