= Absinthe (1913 film) =

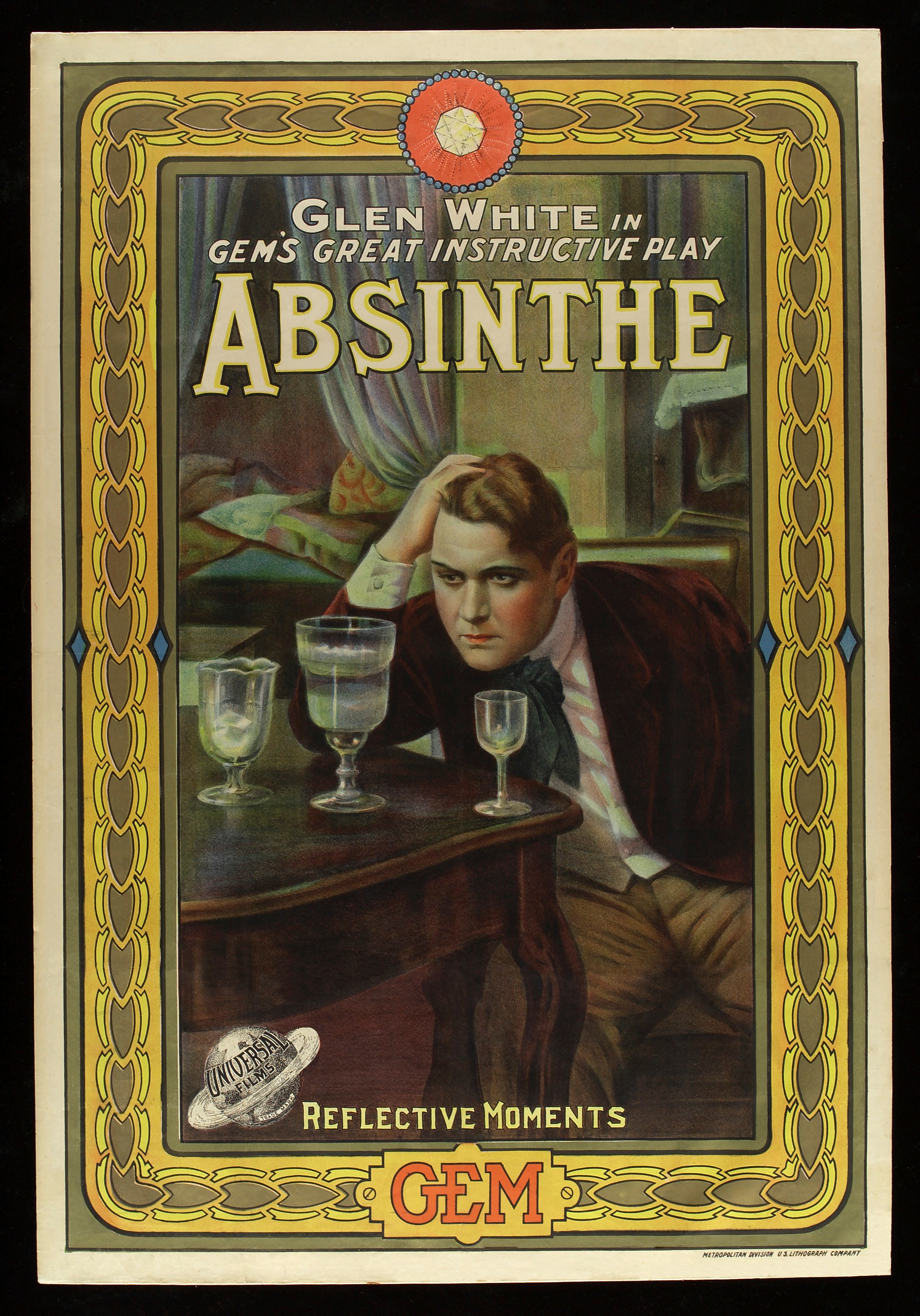
- Starring: Glen White; Sadie Weston
- Production company: Gem Motion Picture Company
- Release date: January 7, 1913 (United States)
- Running time: 11+ minutes
- Country: United States
- Languages: Silent; English intertitles

Absinthe is a 1913 American silent drama short film starring Glen White and Sadie Weston.

The EYE Filmmuseum has a print, which can be viewed via the European Film Gateway and on YouTube.

== Cast ==
- Glen White as The Artist
- Sadie Weston as The Model (as Miss Weston)
