= Nero (1922 film) =

1922 film directed by J. Gordon Edwards

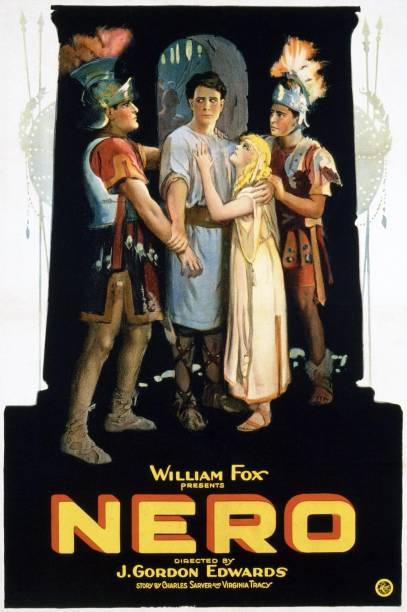
- Directed by: J. Gordon Edwards
- Written by: Charles Sarver; Virginia Tracy
- Produced by: William Fox
- Starring: Jacques Grétillat; Sandro Salvini; Guido Trento; Enzo De Felice
- Cinematography: Horace G. Plympton
- Edited by: Hettie Gray Baker
- Music by: Erno Rapee
- Production company: Fox Film Corporation
- Distributed by: Fox Film Corporation
- Release date: May 22, 1922
- Running time: 120 minutes
- Countries: Italy; United States
- Language: Silent (Italian / English intertitles)
- Budget: $358,000
- Box office: $522,000

Nero is a 1922 American-Italian silent historical film directed by J. Gordon Edwards and starring Jacques Grétillat, Sandro Salvini, and Guido Trento. It portrays the life of the Roman Emperor Nero.

== Plot ==
As described in a film magazine, Poppea conspires with Tullius, the emperor's favorite soldier, to have her carried, apparently against her wishes, to Nero's court, where she is sure that she can make him her slave. In return for his part in the plot, Tullius demands to be made governor of Cyprus. Poppea's husband protests in vain, and, refusing to follow Nero's suggestion that he slay himself, joins the legions outside of Rome. The young soldier Horatius while escorting the princess Marcia, a hostage to Nero, to her destination, falls in love with her. He goes to Spain and, when he comes back victorious, Nero offers him whatever he asks in return for his valor. Horatius asks but for the fair barbarian princess and Nero gives his word. Meanwhile Tullius, ignored by Poppea, plans to usurp her place by bringing Marcia before Nero. Horatius discovers that Marcia has embraced the new religion Christianity and will not consider marrying him unless he converts. When he tries to force his love on her, she cries out for help and Mount Vesuvius erupts, and the ardent soldier falls beneath a pillar. Nero, upon seeing Marcia, desires to withdraw his word, but a storm arises and Haracius carries Marcia to safety. Irked and a prey to ennui, Nero listens to Tullius and permits him to set fire to Rome to inspire Nero's muse. When the people discover what has happened, they cry out against Nero. Poppea suggests that the people be told that the Christians set the fire, and the fickle people believe the lie, saving Nero from their just wrath. The persecutions of the Christians now begins, and Marcia and her slave are among those destined to be fed to the lions. Then the huge servant breaks the lion's jaw. Meanwhile, the legions have revolted against their oppressor and arrive during the exhibition in the arena. Nero flees but, when he cannot escape, commits suicide. Poppea, brutally kicked by Nero, dies in her betrayed husband's arms. Horatius's father Galba is proclaimed emperor, and Horatius embraces Christianity for a happy ending.

== Cast ==
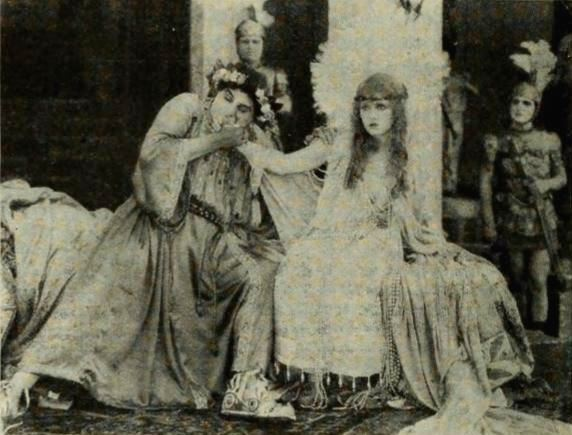
Jacques Grétillat as Nero and Violet Mersereau as Marcia

- Jacques Grétillat as Nero
- Sandro Salvini as Horatius
- Guido Trento as Tullius
- Enzo De Felice as Otho
- Nerio Bernardi as The Apostle
- Adolfo Trouché as Hercules
- Nello Carotenuto as Galba
- Americo De Giorgio as Gracchus
- Alfredo Galoar as Garth
- Ernando Cecilia as Roman General
- Enrico Kant as Roman Captain
- Paulette Duval as Poppea
- Edy Darclea as Acte
- Violet Mersereau as Marcia
- Lina Talba as Julia
- Lydia Yaguinto as 1st handmaiden
- Maria Marchiali as 2nd handmaiden

== Production ==
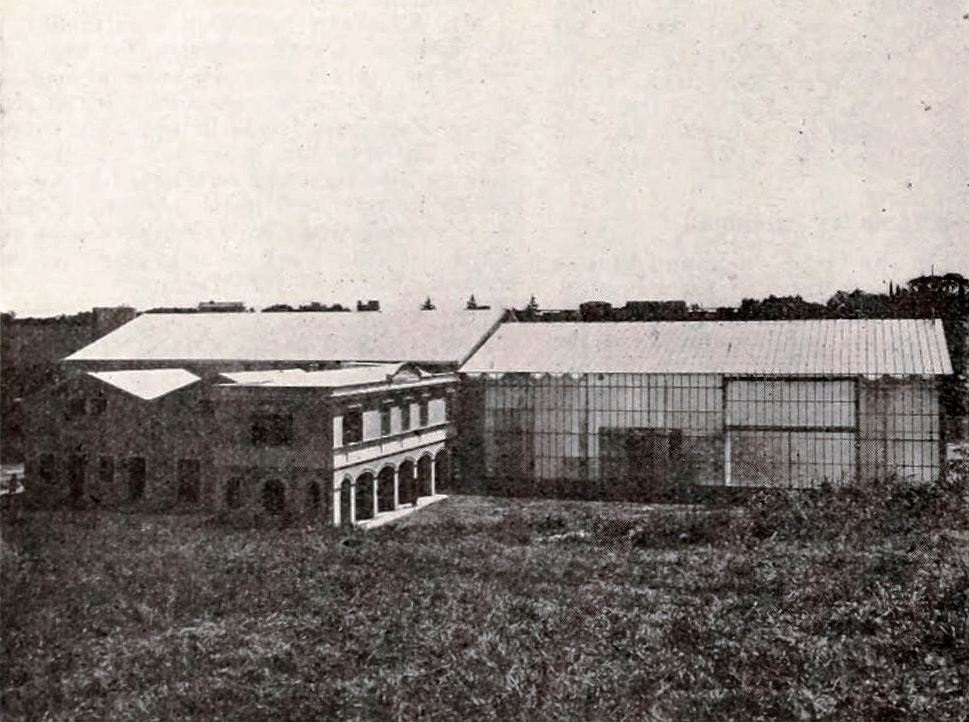
Fox studio in Rome where the film was made

The film was made by an Italian subsidiary of the Fox Film Corporation as part of an ambitious plan to make major films in Europe (with Britain and France planned as destinations as well as Italy). The film was shot on location in and around Rome, including at the Colosseum. Despite the fact that production costs were cheaper in Italy than Hollywood, the film's budget continued to grow. Some differences in labor demands (Italian extras insisting on lap breaks in the afternoons) caused some difficulty for the production as well. The film ultimately cost $358,000 to make. Although the film was eventually able to gross $522,000 this came out as a nearly $60,000 loss due to advertising and distribution costs. The film ended Fox's European scheme after only one production, with an announced film of Mary, Queen of Scots never being made.

== Reception ==
The film received very positive reviews from critics. Variety observed "There are many who will say after viewing Nero that Edwards is the only director with a legitimate claim as a rival of D.W. Griffith.

== Preservation ==
With no prints of Nero located in any film archives, it is considered a lost film. In February 2021, the film was cited by the National Film Preservation Board on their Lost U.S. Silent Feature Films.

== See also ==
- List of lost films
- 1937 Fox vault fire
- Nero (2004)

== Bibliography ==
- Solomon, Aubrey. The Fox Film Corporation, 1915-1935: A History and Filmography (McFarland, 2011)
