= Edward Holt =

English footballer

Personal information
- Full name: J. Edward Holt
- Date of birth: 1880
- Date of death: Unknown
- Position: Outside right

Senior career*
Years	Team	Apps	(Gls)
- Newton Heath Athletic
1899–1900	Newton Heath (trial)	1	(0)
- * Club domestic league appearances and goals

J. Edward Holt (born 1880) was an English footballer who played as an outside right. Born in Withington, Lancashire, he played for Newton Heath Athletic and on a trial basis for Newton Heath. He made his only appearance in the Football League for Newton Heath on 28 April 1900, scoring in a 2–1 win over Chesterfield at Bank Street.
