= John McCullough (actor) =

American actor

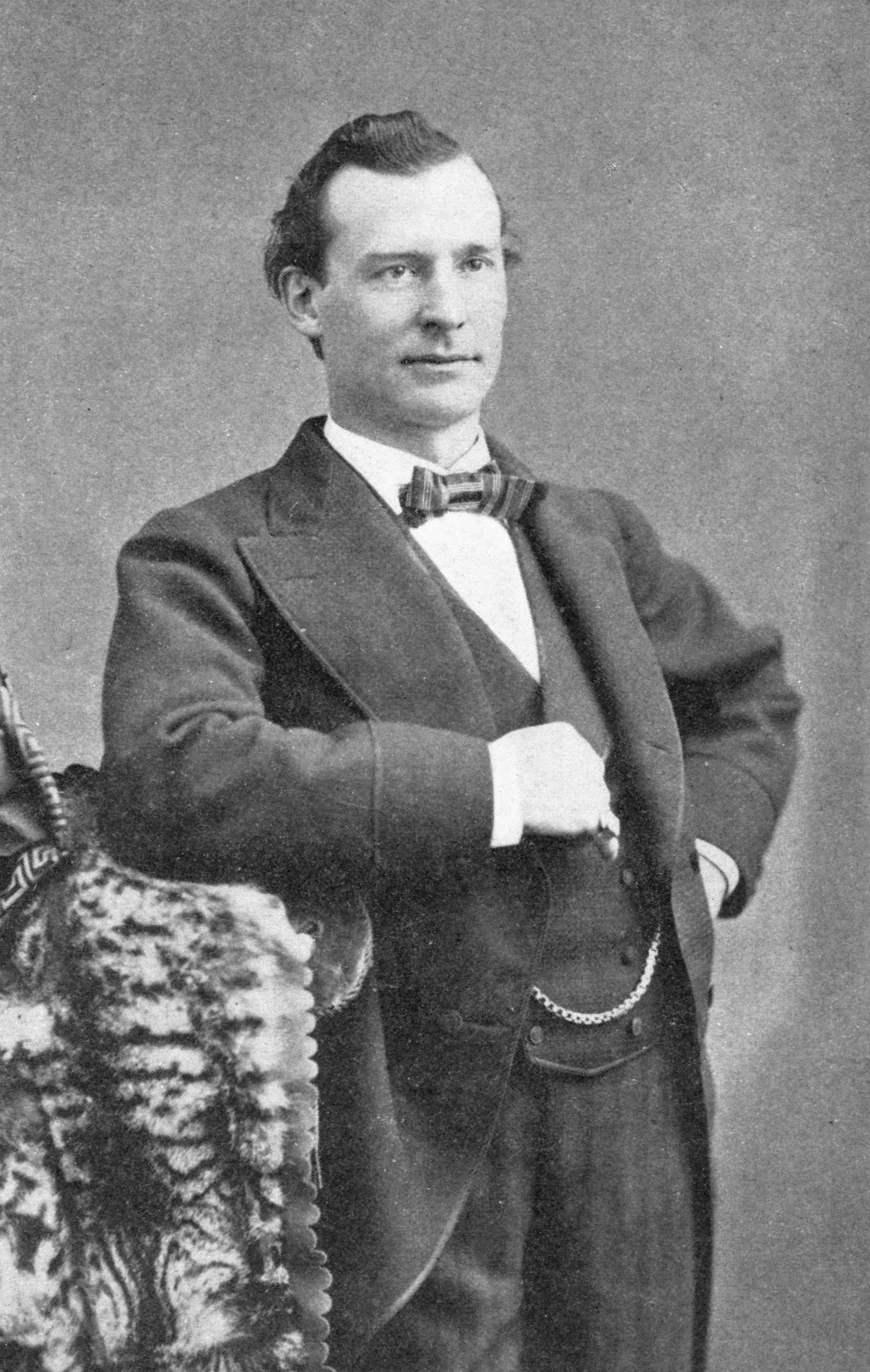
John McCullough

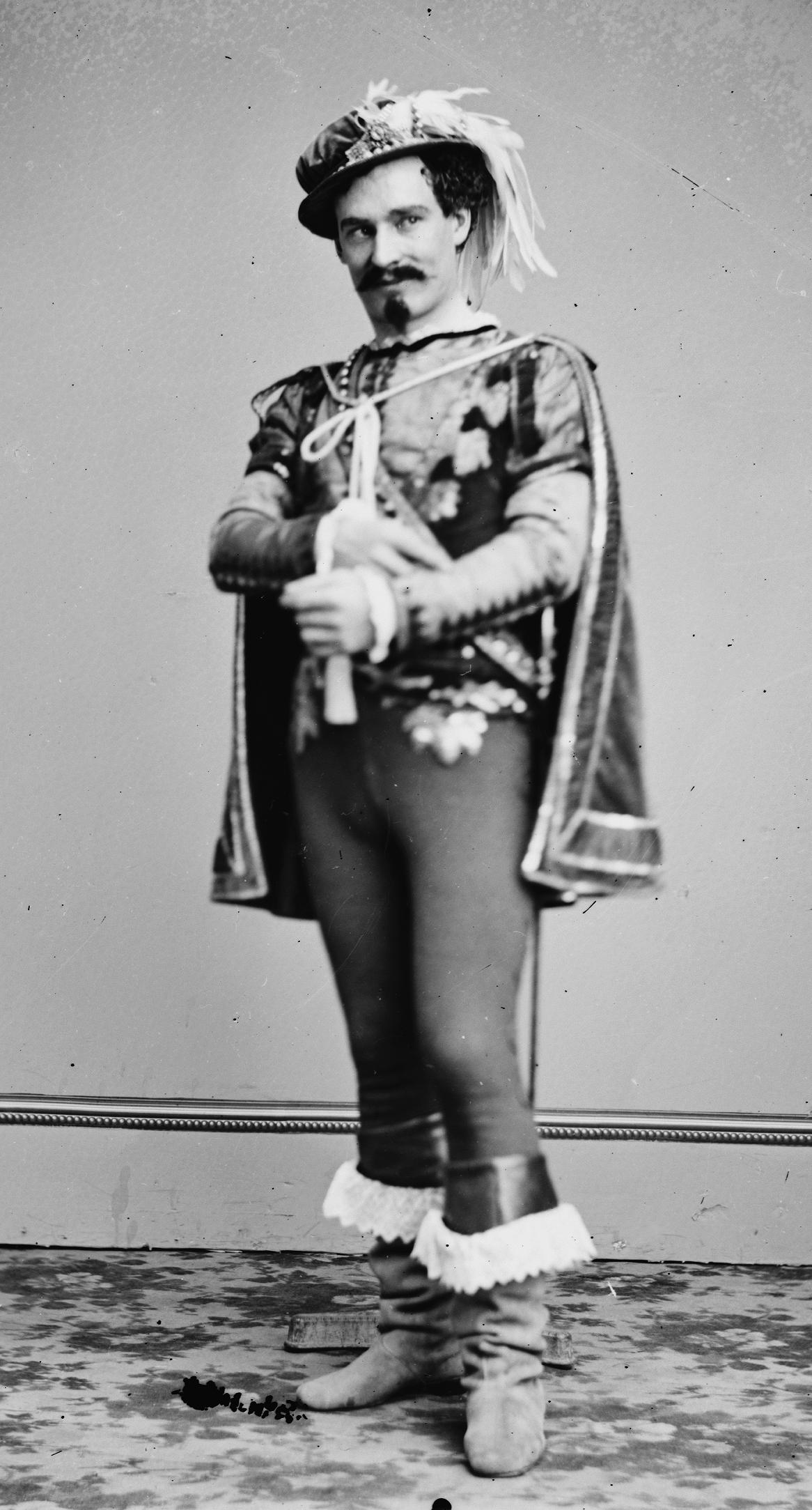
McCullough in costume

John Edward McCullough (November 2, 1832 – November 8, 1885) was an Irish-born American actor.

== Biography ==
John Edward McCullough was born in Coleraine, Ireland. He went to America at the age of 16, and made his first appearance on the stage at the Arch Street Theatre, Philadelphia, in 1857. In support of Edwin Forrest and Edwin Booth he played second roles in Shakespearean and other tragedies, and Forrest left him by will all his prompt books. Virginius was his greatest success, although even in this part and as Othello he was coldly received in England (1881). On the night of September 29, 1884, he broke down on stage at McVicker's Theater in Chicago and was unable to recite his lines. The audience, thinking he was drunk, hissed and booed.

In fact, McCullough was suffering from the early stages of general paresis. He was later committed to the Bloomingdale Insane Asylum but continued to decline and finally died on November 8, 1885, in an asylum in Philadelphia. His "insane ravings" became popular and were imitated in one of the first audio recordings.

He is interred at Mount Moriah Cemetery.

== Career and legacy ==
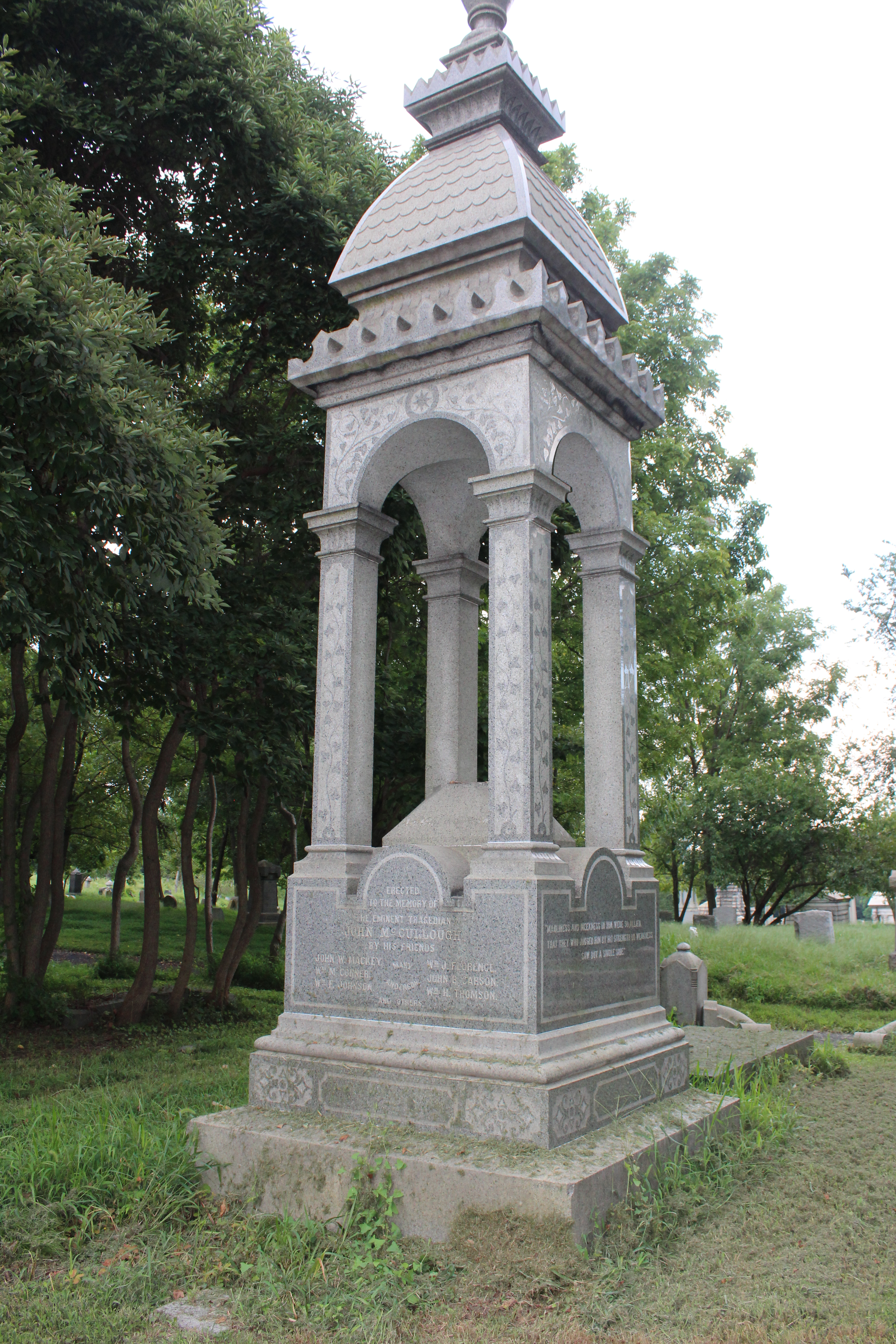
John McCullough Memorial in Mount Moriah Cemetery

On March 18, 1865, less than a month before he assassinated President Abraham Lincoln, John Wilkes Booth appeared at Ford's Theatre, Washington, in the play The Apostate which was performed as a benefit for John McCullough.

McCullough came West in 1866 with his mentor Edwin Forrest where he grew as an actor through practice before audiences in Sacramento and Virginia City. The most celebrated roles of McCullough's career, King Lear, Virginius, and Richelieu were first performed before Virginia City audiences.

In 1869, in partnership with Lawrence Barrett, McCullough built the California Theatre on Bush Street in San Francisco. It boomed during economic prosperity becoming one of the best regarded theaters West of the Rocky Mountains. Selling out his interest in 1877, McCullough created a combination company that toured America. He was known for an intelligent, but not intellectual Hamlet and had an average Joe quality in performance which tied him to the West's working classes.

McCullough died in 1885, six days after his 53rd birthday. Edwin Booth reportedly declined to contribute to the fund for McCullough's elaborate granite gravesite monument in Philadelphia, stating that greater actors than him, such as his own father and Edwin Forrest, had no similar monuments upon their graves.

== Haunting ==
An apocryphal version of his death which arose as theatre lore is reported by the National Theatre in Washington, D.C., where he appeared a number of times in various roles between 1875 and 1889 [incorrect date—he died in 1885]. According to this version of events, McCullough was murdered backstage by a fellow actor, was buried by members of the acting company in a cellar beneath the stage, and is a resident ghost.
