= Gossamer fabric =

Thin, sheer, woven fabric similar to gauze

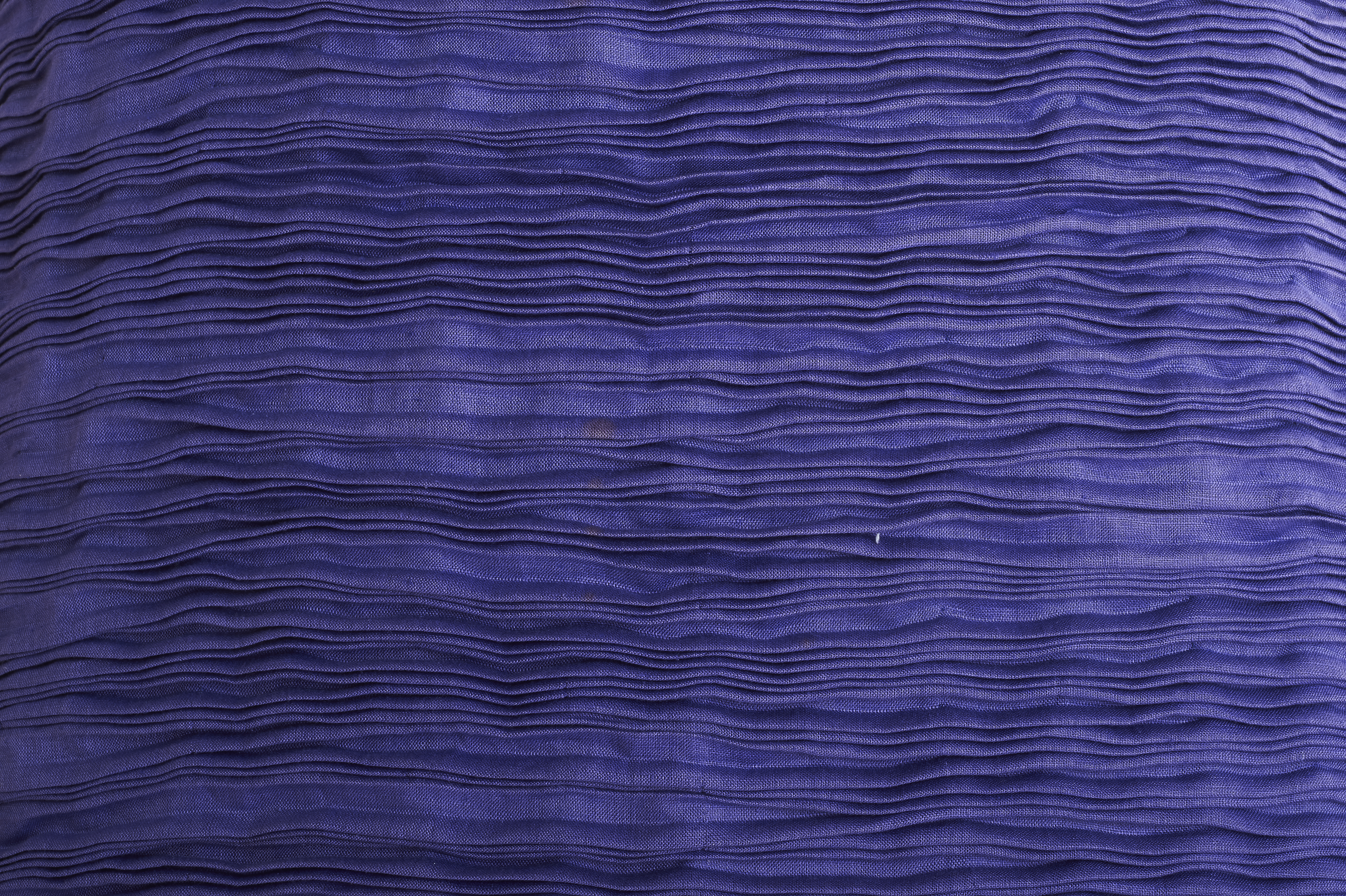
Detail of pleated gown made of gossamer.

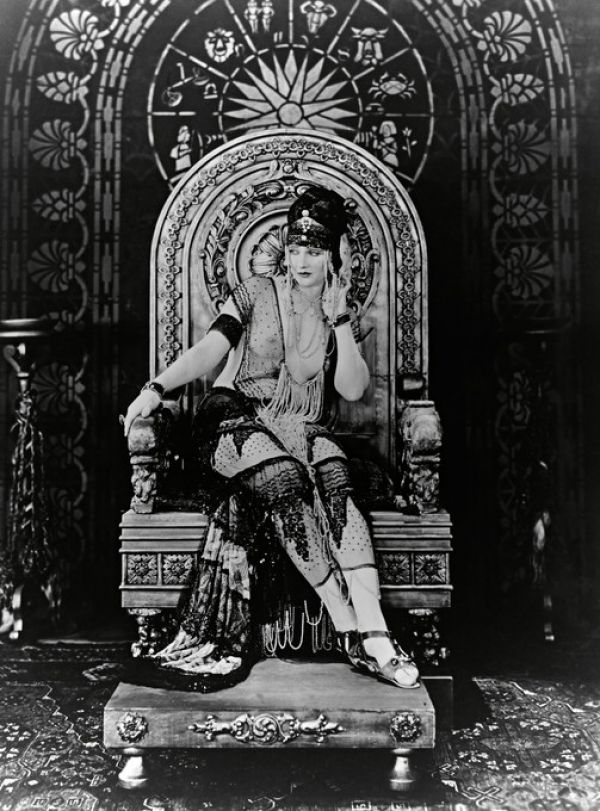
Still from the film The Queen of Sheba (1921) with actress Betty Blythe in a gossamer top

Gossamer fabric is a thin, sheer woven fabric. The structure of the fabric is similar to a gauze. It is usually made of silk, cotton, or wool. The fabric may be coated with rubber to make it waterproof.

== Gossamer ==
The name of the fabric is said of something very fine and delicate, and it is associated with a thread-like filmy substance spun by small spiders.

== Use ==
The Gossamer is a very delicate and a see-through fabric. It is used in veils, dresses, long streamers, curtains, and decorations.

== See also ==
- Casement cloth
- Marquisette
- Ninon
