= Agra gauze =

Thin, translucent fabric with a loose, open weave

Agra gauze was a thin, translucent fabric with a loose open weave. The material was made of silk with a plain weave. Agra gauze was also known as Agre. The fabric is named after the Agra city. The cloth was used in trimmings.

== Structure ==
The Agra gauze is a stiffened silk gauze. It is very fine and transparent but strong, the structure is similar to a gauze fabric that is loose and open in weave. It is finished with a stiffener to make it a stiffened material.

== See also ==
- Trim (sewing)
- Lace
- Mesh
- Ninon
