= Margaret Whistler =

Actress and costume designer in the United States

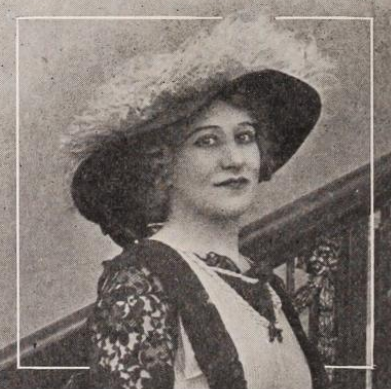
- Whistler in 1916
- Born: Louise Margaret Pepper; July 31, 1888; Louisville, Kentucky, U.S.
- Died: August 25, 1939 (aged 51)
- Occupations: Actress, costume designer

Margaret Whistler (born Louise Margaret Pepper; July 31, 1888 – August 25, 1939) was a performer and actress in films in the United States as well as a costume designer. She appeared in about 30 films before transitioning to full time costume designing at various studios.

A character actress, she also did wardrobe design including see-through gossamer robes and one costume essentially consisting of strands of pearls for the 1921 film Queen of Sheeba.

Whistler died on August 25, 1939, at the age of 51.

== Early life ==
Louise Margaret Pepper was born in Louisville, Kentucky, in 1888. She attended Notre Dame Academy in Washington D.C.

== Career ==
She worked for Universal. She was a costume designer at several studios. She married radium researcher Merle Farnsworth and became Louise Farnsworth. They divorced after a few years.

== Filmography ==
- Alas and Alack (1915)
- Doctor Neighbor (1916) as Mrs. Albert Rogers
- Come Through (1917) as Mrs. Stoat
- Her Soul's Inspiration (1917) as Madame La Rue
- The Little Orphan (1917) as Fannie Harrison
- The Queen of Sheba, costume designer
