= Delicate =

Delicate may refer to:

== Music ==
- Delicate (album), by Martha & The Muffins (2010)
- "Delicate" (Taylor Swift song), song by Taylor Swift from Reputation (2017)
- "Delicate" (Terence Trent D'Arby song), by Terence Trent D'Arby featuring Des'ree from Symphony or Damn (1993)
- "Delicate", song by D. Rice from O (2002)
- "Delicate", song by Operator from Soulcrusher (2007)

== Other uses ==
- Delicates, garments that include delicate fabrics
- Delicacies
- Mythimna vitellina (the delicate), a moth of the family Noctuidae
- American Horror Story: Delicate
