= Bill Smith (jewelry designer) =

American fashion and jewelry designer (born 1933)

Bill Smith (born 1933) is an American fashion and jewelry designer who was the first black recipient of a Coty Award for his designs. He has designed for a number of companies, including costume jewelry for Coro and Richelieu, leather goods for Mark Cross, and furs for Ben Kahn, along with designing jewelry for Cartier.

== Biography ==
Born in 1933 in Madison, Indiana, in his early childhood Bill Smith was encouraged to develop and make the most of his talents. He went to Indiana University Bloomington to study art from 1951 to 1952 and whilst there, also explored dance. In 1954 he headed to New York to study dance with Alwin Nikolais, but decided to focus on jewelry design and in 1958 set up a small business in Murray Hill, Manhattan. Whilst studying dance, he worked part-time soldering and casting for a jewelry company, which gave him technical and artisan knowledge to support his designing.

In June 1968, Bill Smith was made vice-president of Richelieu, at that time the second-largest jewelry firm in America, after only two months with the company as their head designer. Later that year in October, he was commissioned to exclusively create all the jewelry for the Broadway production of Coco, a stage musical about the life of Coco Chanel starring Katharine Hepburn.

Bill Smith was one of six jewelry designers honoured with a special Coty Award in 1970 alongside Daniel Stoenescu and Steven Brody of Cadoro, Alexis Kirk, Marty Ruza and Cliff Nicholson.

His designs draw inspiration from his African heritage and have been described as sparse and sculptural. At the time of the Coty Award win his designs incorporated tassels, leather, and cord alongside metal and stone, and he had experience with precious and semi-precious stones and metals. Alongside more traditional jewelry, he offered chignon covers and belts, including one in fringed suede fastened with an eight-inch gilded mermaid, and a range of architectural ethnic-style crosses, titled "Peacemakers", hanging from silk cords.

In 1972, he posed with Naomi Sims for a fashion spread on black designers and their muses for the April 1972 issue of The Look magazine, which showcased one of his 18-carat gold cuffs for Cartier, modelled by Sims. Sims had introduced him to Kenton Corp, who set up Bill Smith Design Studios, Inc., with Smith as the president, from where he was creating jewelry for Cartier and leather accessories for Mark Cross. The company had disestablished by 1981, when Smith was working as a consultant on accessory design for Omega Inc. and the Hattie Carnegie company which made accessories to accompany Anne Klein's clothing collections. He won an award for excellence in jewelry design in 1984 at the 6th Annual Black Designers Tribute. His life and designs are chronicled in the book Visionary Designs by Bill Smith, tj. written by JoAnne M Spiller. An obituary posted only in the August 28, 1991 issue of Women's Wear Daily states that Bill died at St. Vincent's Hospital in New York City on August 22, 1991.
