= The Queen of Sheba (1921 film) =

1921 film directed by J. Gordon Edwards

Queen of Sheba
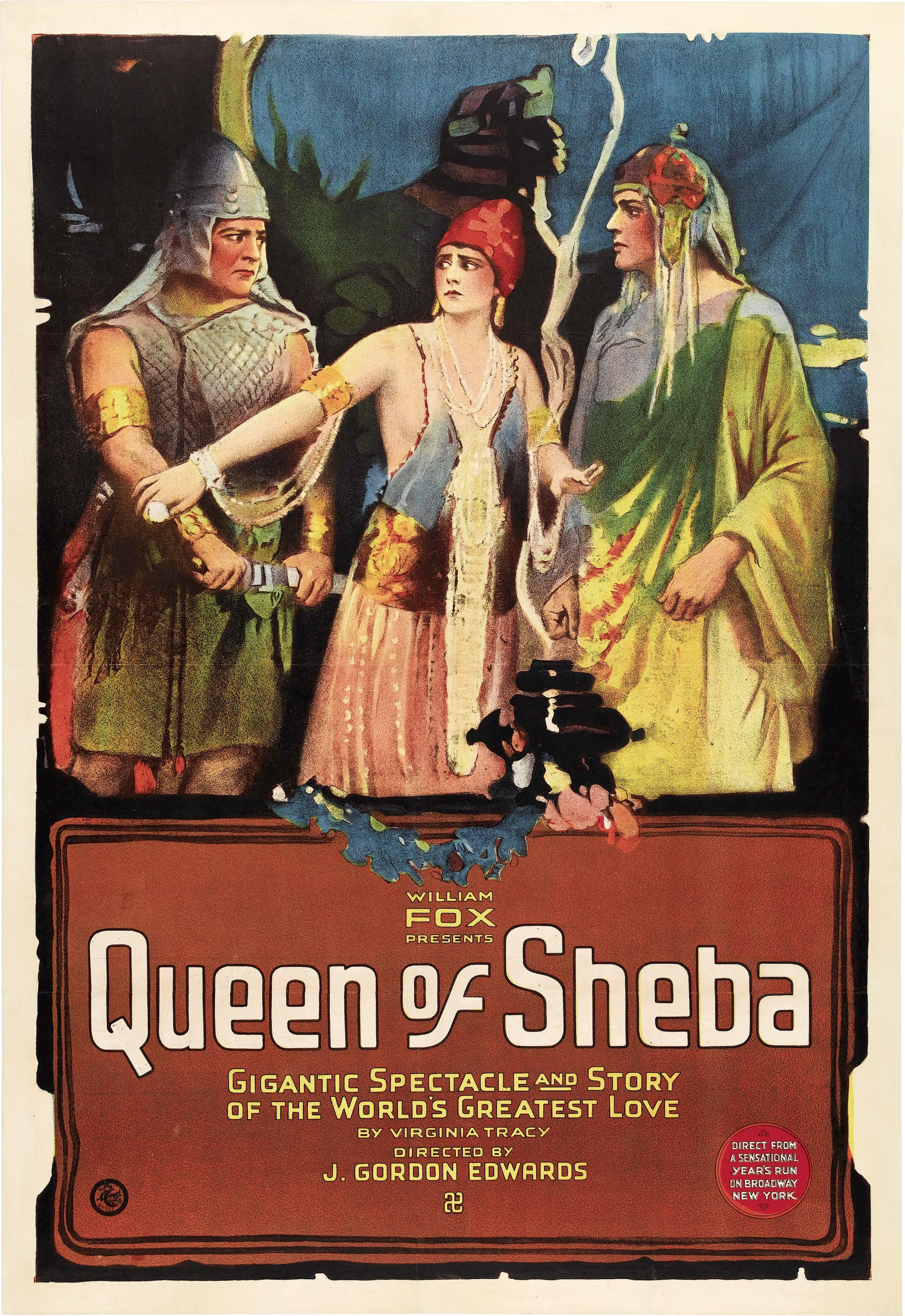
- Poster for the film.
- Directed by: J. Gordon Edwards
- Written by: J. Gordon Edwards; Virginia Tracy
- Produced by: William Fox
- Starring: Betty Blythe
- Cinematography: John W. Boyle
- Distributed by: Fox Film Corporation
- Release date: April 10, 1921
- Running time: 9 reels
- Country: United States
- Language: Silent (English intertitles)
- Budget: $479,000
- Box office: $1,121,000

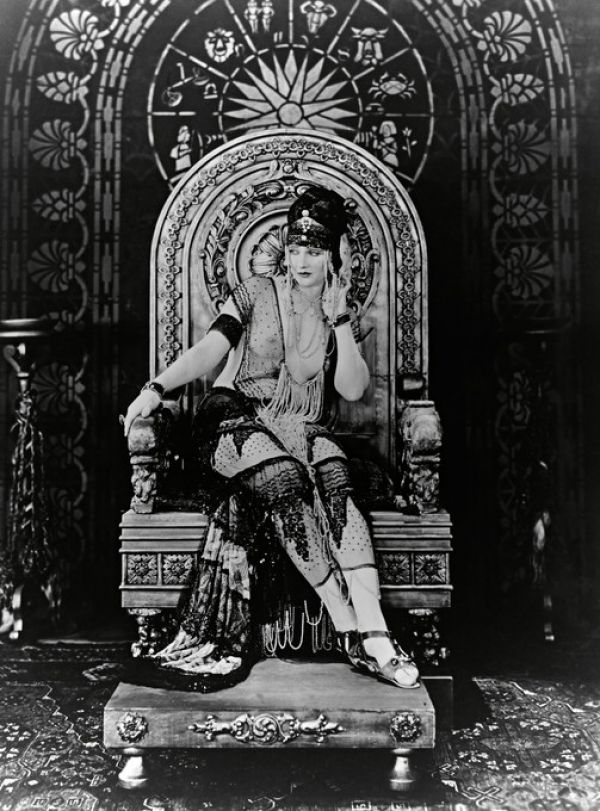
Betty Blythe as the Queen of Sheba

The Queen of Sheba is a 1921 American silent drama film produced by Fox studios about the story of the ill-fated romance between Solomon, King of Israel, and the Queen of Sheba. Written and directed by J. Gordon Edwards, it starred Betty Blythe as the Queen and Fritz Leiber Sr. as King Solomon. The film is well known amongst silent film buffs for the risqué costumes worn by Blythe, as evidenced by several surviving stills taken during the production. Only a short fragment of the film survives.

== Cast ==
- Betty Blythe as Queen of Sheba
- Fritz Leiber as King Solomon
- Claire de Lorez as Queen Amrath
- George Siegmann as King Armud of Sheba
- Herbert Heyes as Tamaran
- Herschel Mayall as Menton
- G. Raymond Nye as Adonijah
- George Nichols as King David
- Genevieve Blinn as Beth-Sheba
- Pat Moore as Sheba's son
- Joan Gordon as Nomis, Sheba's sister
- William Hardy as Olos
- Paul Cazeneuve as Pharaoh's Envoy
- John Cosgrove as King of Tyre
- Nell Craig as Princess Vashti
- Al Fremont as Army Captain
- Earl Crain as Joab
- Frederick Kovert as Peacock
- Al Hoxie as Charioteer (uncredited)
- Robert Livingston (uncredited)

== Production ==
The film was originally intended for Theda Bara. However Bara chose not to renew her contract and, after making the ill-fated Kathleen Mavourneen (1919), she all but retired from filmmaking. While making Mavourneen, construction began on sets for The Queen of Sheba. Not wanting it to go to waste, William Fox chose to put Betty Blythe in the role. The film became a hit but Blythe never matched its success with her later films.

The highlight of the film were the chariot races. The hippodrome set for the chariot race was constructed on the north end of the Fox Hollywood studio lot. It was a 1,250 by 3,100 ft ellipse. Western star Tom Mix staged and directed the all-female chariot race between the Queen of Sheba and Princess Vashti using 10 chariots, 40 horses, and a cast of 3,500. Mix convinced actresses Blythe and Nell Craig to take the reins and drive their chariots, and in the first of the races Mix drove one himself while wearing Roman robes.

The risqué costumes of Blythe made by Margaret Whistler (1888 - 1939), a former character actress who shifted to working in the wardrobe department, included see-through gossamer robes and one costume essentially consisting of strands of pearls. The topless scenes filmed for this movie were seen only in the European release versions.

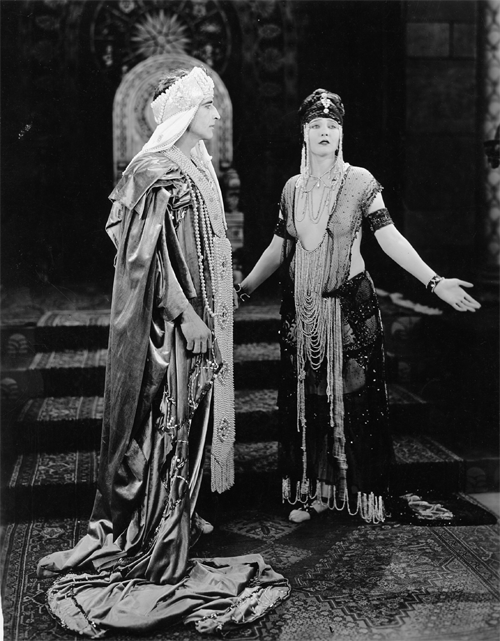
Fritz Leiber, Sr. and Betty Blythe in The Queen of Sheba

== Reception ==
Although the film received good reviews, its premiere run disappointed Fox, and its road show was cancelled. In December 1921, Fox announced that the film could be booked by regular exhibitors in the next season. Regardless, on a budget of $479,000 The Queen of Sheba still grossed $1,121,000 in worldwide rentals.

== Preservation ==
The surviving fragment

The film is presumed lost. A 1937 New Jersey vault fire destroyed most of the Fox silent film negatives and prints, and it is unlikely a copy of The Queen of Sheba still exists. However, in May 2011, a 17-second fragment was found, and initially mistakenly identified as from Cleopatra (1917), though comparison with stills from the movie have since led to it being identified correctly.

== See also ==
- List of incomplete or partially lost films
- List of lost films
- Nudity in film
