= Clifton Nicholson =

American sculptor and jewelry designer

- Born: 1944 (age 81–82); Indiana
- Other name: Cliff Nicholson
- Education: Purdue University
- Known for: Jewelry design, sculpture, peacock breeding.

Clifton 'Cliff' Nicholson is an American sculptor and jewelry designer.

== Early life and education ==
Clifton L. Nicholson Jr. grew up in Indiana where, from an early age, he developed his sculpting skills by carving soap.

Nicholson studied engineering before taking a metals design class, eventually choosing to focus on interior design at Purdue University. Although he hated the subject, he still learned enough to design "Roughwood", a house for his parents in Indiana, for which he received a Burlington House Award, which was presented annually by the Burlington textiles company to those whose interior design skills were deemed deserving of recognition. He graduated in 1967 with a Master's in jewelry and metal design, with a minor in weaving. After graduation, Nicholson briefly worked as official silversmith for the Restoration Commission in St. Augustine, Florida before moving to New York.

== Jewelry ==
Some of Nicholson's early designs were exhibited in the Museum of Contemporary Crafts (now the Museum of Arts and Design), New York. Upon his arrival in New York, Nicholson became an assistant designer for Richelieu, at that time the second-largest jewelry company in America. He was introduced to the company by Bill Smith, also from Indiana, who became vice president of Richelieu after only two months. Whilst working for Richelieu Nicholson took advantage of the nights and weekends to produce his own work, which he sold to Neiman Marcus and Henri Bendel. One of his shell, leather and feather necklaces was modelled by Lauren Hutton on the cover of the edition of March 15, 1970 of American Vogue. This exposure led to Nicholson being fired by Richelieu, who took exception to their junior designer receiving so much attention. Later that year, Nicholson was one of six jewelry designers honoured with a special Coty Award in 1970 alongside Daniel Stoenescu and Steven Brody of Cadoro, Alexis Kirk, Marty Ruza and Bill Smith. Like Alexis Kirk, he received the award for his debut collection.

Nicholson's jewelry is known for its use of natural materials, such as feathers, uncut crystal, cowrie shells, petrified beetles and mother-of-pearl, which he combined into sculptural, one-of-a-kind forms. In 1974, he created his first diamond collection, using the gemstones and small amounts of gold to complement his shell sculptures. By the early 1980s, he was relying less on feathers and leather, and was producing precious metal jewellery using the lost-wax method.

Among his inspirations, Nicholson credits the architects Antoni Gaudi and Frank Lloyd Wright, the glass artists Émile Gallé and René Lalique, and Louis Comfort Tiffany as particularly influential. Nature is also a very significant influence on his work, and he has said he finds it difficult to work in an urban context. After starting out in Manhattan with only a small tree and a pet African bullfrog to keep him in touch with nature, he relocated his studio in the early 1980s to Kerhonkson, a tiny hamlet in New York State which offered a more conductive working environment.

A retrospective exhibition of his work was hosted by the Kentucky Museum of Art and Craft (now KMAC Museum) from April to June 2004.

== Personal life ==
After 28 years in New York, Nicholson bought Roughwood from his parents and moved back home to Scottsburg, Indiana, where he has worked from since. In addition to his jewelry and sculpture, he currently runs the Roughwood Aviary which is dedicated to breeding peafowl and pheasants, including Onagadori chickens and rare species such as the great argus pheasant and the Malay and Bornean peacock-pheasants.
