= Stoenescu =

Stoenescu is a Romanian surname. Notable people with the surname include:

- Alex Mihai Stoenescu (born 1953), Romanian writer, journalist and politician
- Dan Stoenescu (born 1980), Romanian political scientist and journalist
- Daniel Stoenescu (1921-after 1970), Coty-Award-winning jewelry designer for Cadoro
- Dragoș Stoenescu (born 1979), Romanian water-polo player
- Eustațiu Stoenescu, (1884-1957), Romanian artist
- Elena Caragiani-Stoenescu (1887–1929), the first Romanian female aviator
- Mircea Stoenescu (1943–2022), Romanian football player
