= Marty Ruza =

American fashion designer

Marty Ruza of "Ruza Creations"/"Elegant Belts" was an American designer of leather fashion accessories who won a Coty Award for jewelry design in 1970. He was described by the fashion journalist Eleanor Lambert as the "leader of the fringed leather and beads school".

Ruza won his Special Coty Award along with five other jewelry designers - Bill Smith, Daniel Stoenescu and Steven Brody at Cadoro, Alexis Kirk, and Cliff Nicholson. For the Coty show, his jewelry, along with matching belts and bags, was showcased in a short film montage by Milton Greene. Whilst his leather goods were described as jewel-like, Ruza's company, Elegant Belts, specialised in belts, bags and headbands rather than focussing on jewelry like the other recipients of the Special award. Among Ruza's designs were the "sewing bag tote" designed for women who wanted to carry their needlework around with them, and bags and belts in embroidered vinyl. Elegant Belts was still in business in the early 1980s, with Ruza as its president.
