= List of delicate fabrics =

Delicate fabrics are distinguished from sturdier fabrics by being lighter in weight-per-unit-of-surface-area, often more flexible and pliable, and often more liable to damage by wear and tear and by choices as to mode of laundering.

Clothiers' choices of fabrics likely to be considered as delicate are especially likely to result in garments described as "delicates", especially in the context of laundering them.

The following are often considered to be among delicate fabrics:

- Chiffon
- Georgette
- Ninon
- Lace (including Bobbin lace)
- Most sheer fabrics
- Silk, especially embroidered, Tussar, and Rajshahi silk
- Cashmere
- Organza
- Tulle
