= Cadoro =

Manhattan-based jewelry company

Cadoro, or Cadoro Jewels Corporation, was a Manhattan-based jewelry company founded in 1954 by Steven Brody and Daniel Stoenescu (aka Staneskieu), specialising in fashionable costume jewelry sold via department stores such as Neiman Marcus and Saks Fifth Avenue. The company closed in 1987 following Brody's retirement as president.

== Company history ==
Steven Stuart Brody (1919 or 1926, Philadelphia – 23 December 1994) initially studied business administration at Wharton School, Pennsylvania, then attended the Curtis Institute of Music. After a stint as an actor in radio soap operas, he went to Paris, where he met Daniel Stoenescu (1921-after 1970), son of the Romanian artist Eustațiu Stoenescu, and nephew of Princess Ghika, who proposed they go into jewelry design together.

Cadoro, which was launched on Fifth Avenue, became known for inventive jewelry which used chenille and plastics alongside more traditional crystals, brushed gold, and enamel for designs which were bought by the likes of the Duchess of Windsor and Barbra Streisand. In 1969, Cadoro also designed body jewellery in the form of filigree bras and breastplates for wearing with trendy see-through clothing to enable followers of fashion to preserve their modesty. Cadoro's metal "breastplates" were inspired by a statue of Venus found at Pompeii. The following year in 1970 Brody and Stoenescu were two of a group of costume jewelry designers awarded special Coty Awards, alongside Alexis Kirk, Marty Ruza, Cliff Nicholson and the first black recipient of a Coty, Bill Smith. Cadoro designs for that year were Indian-themed, following on from an African and Pre-Columbian art-inspired collection in polished wood and carved gold and silver.

Examples of Cadoro jewelry are held by the Metropolitan Museum of Art and the Museum of Modern Art.

Brody became president of the company in 1960, and when he retired in 1987, the company also closed down. He died at the Beth Israel Medical Center on December 23, 1994, of pneumonia following a long illness.
