= Casement cloth =

Lightweight sheer fabric made of various fibers used chiefly for curtains

Casement cloth is a lightweight sheer fabric made of various fibers used chiefly for curtains.

== Weave ==
It is possible to make casement cloth with any fine natural or synthetic yarns. The weave structure may vary from plain to figured one. The weave is generally open. The colors are usually white, ivory and cream.

== Use ==
Casement cloth is mainly used as a decorative material in curtains and draperies.

== See also ==
- Casement window
- Marquisette
- Ninon
