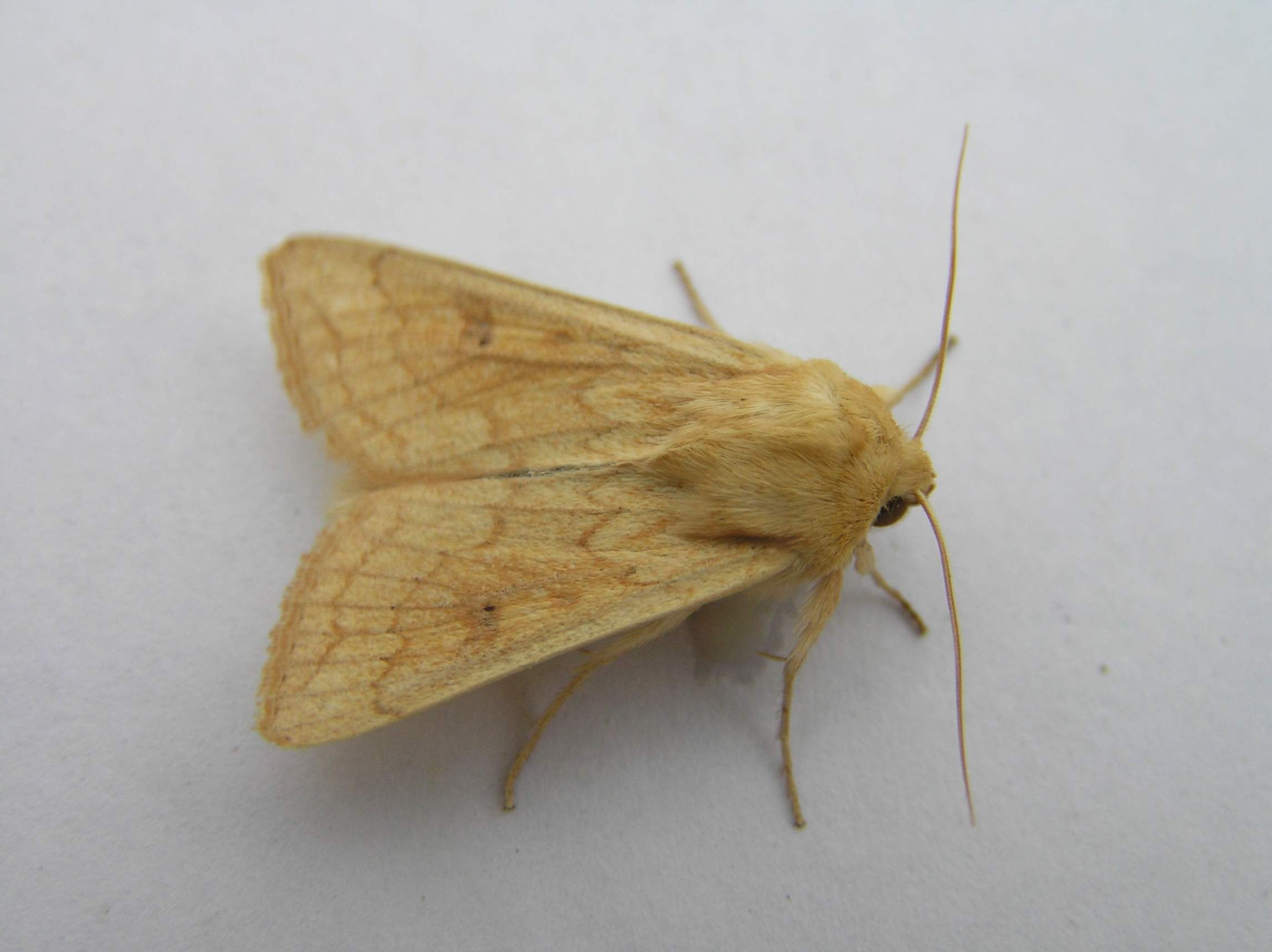

Scientific classification
- Domain: Eukaryota
- Kingdom: Animalia
- Phylum: Arthropoda
- Class: Insecta
- Order: Lepidoptera
- Superfamily: Noctuoidea
- Family: Noctuidae
- Genus: Mythimna
- Species: M. vitellina

Binomial name
- Mythimna vitellina (Hübner, 1808)

= Mythimna vitellina =

Species of moth

Mythimna vitellina, the delicate, is a moth of the family Noctuidae. The species was first described by Jacob Hübner in 1808. It is mainly distributed throughout southern Europe and the southern part of eastern Europe. It is also found far less commonly further north in Europe. Also in North Africa, the Near East and Middle East, Central Asia and western China.

== Technical description and variation ==
The wingspan is 36–43 mm. The length of the forewings varies from 12 to 14 mm. Forewing pale yellowish ochreous, typically strongly flushed with rufous; veins finely rufous; lines fine, more or less angulated, the inner and outer approximated on inner margin; stigmata indistinct: the orbicular slight, often obsolete; reniform rufous, with a dark spot in lower end; hindwing ochreous white, greyer in female, the veins often fuscous; the pale, less highly coloured, specimens, with whiter hindwings, ab. pallida nov. [Warren] which seem to be comparatively rare in western Europe, though occurring in Switzerland and the Canaries, are the usual form in Syria and Turkestan. See also Hacker et al.

== Biology ==
The flight season is recorded in August and October, but also sometimes earlier in the season..

Larva pale tannish-peach colour; dorsal and subdorsal lines white, with darker edges; spiracles black on a pale yellow lateral line; head brown with black markings. The larva feeds on various grasses.

1. The flight season refers to the British Isles. This may vary in other parts of the range.
