= See-through clothing =

Garment through which the wearer's body or undergarments can be seen

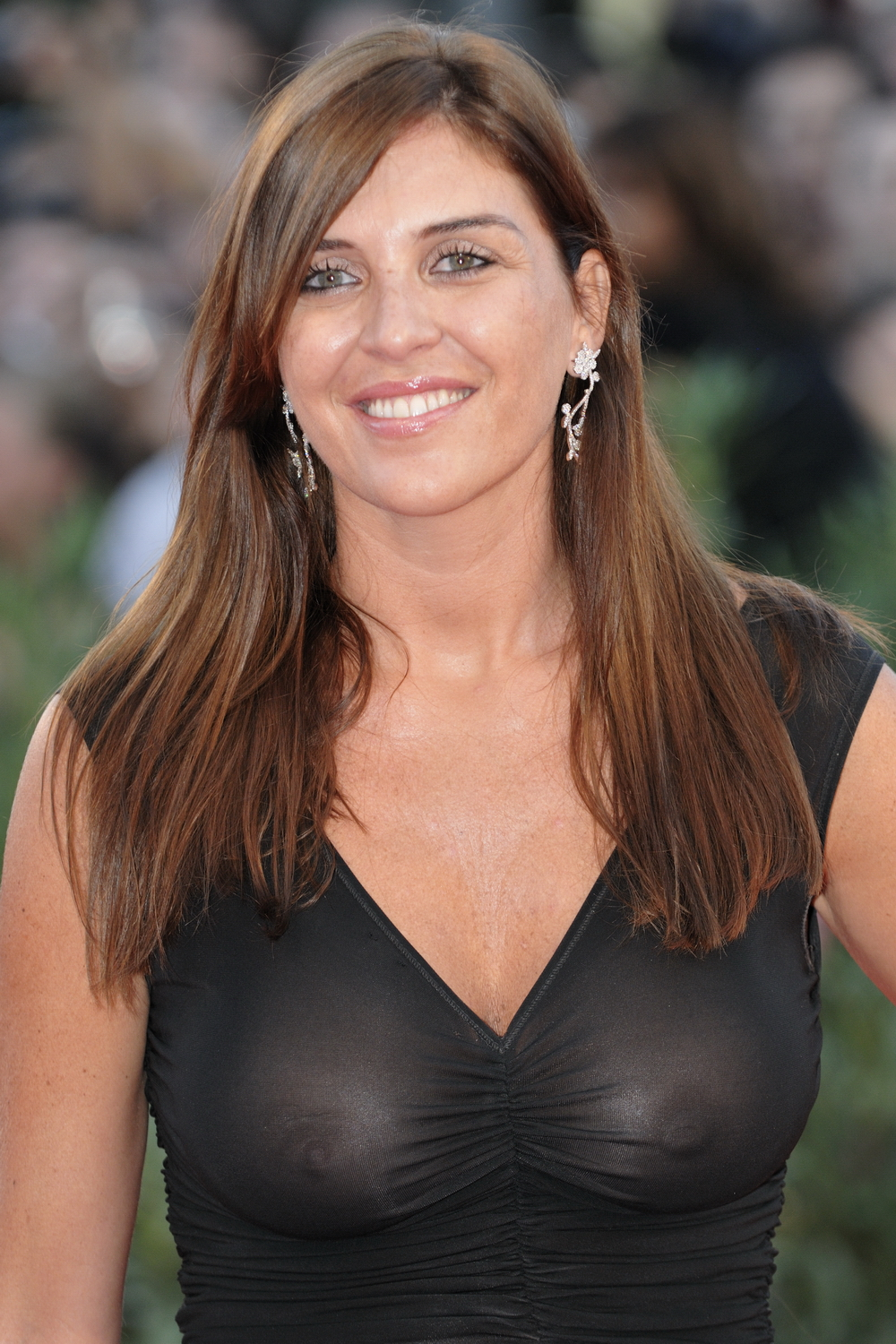
Actress Gisella Marengo in see-through top at the Venice International Film Festival, 2009

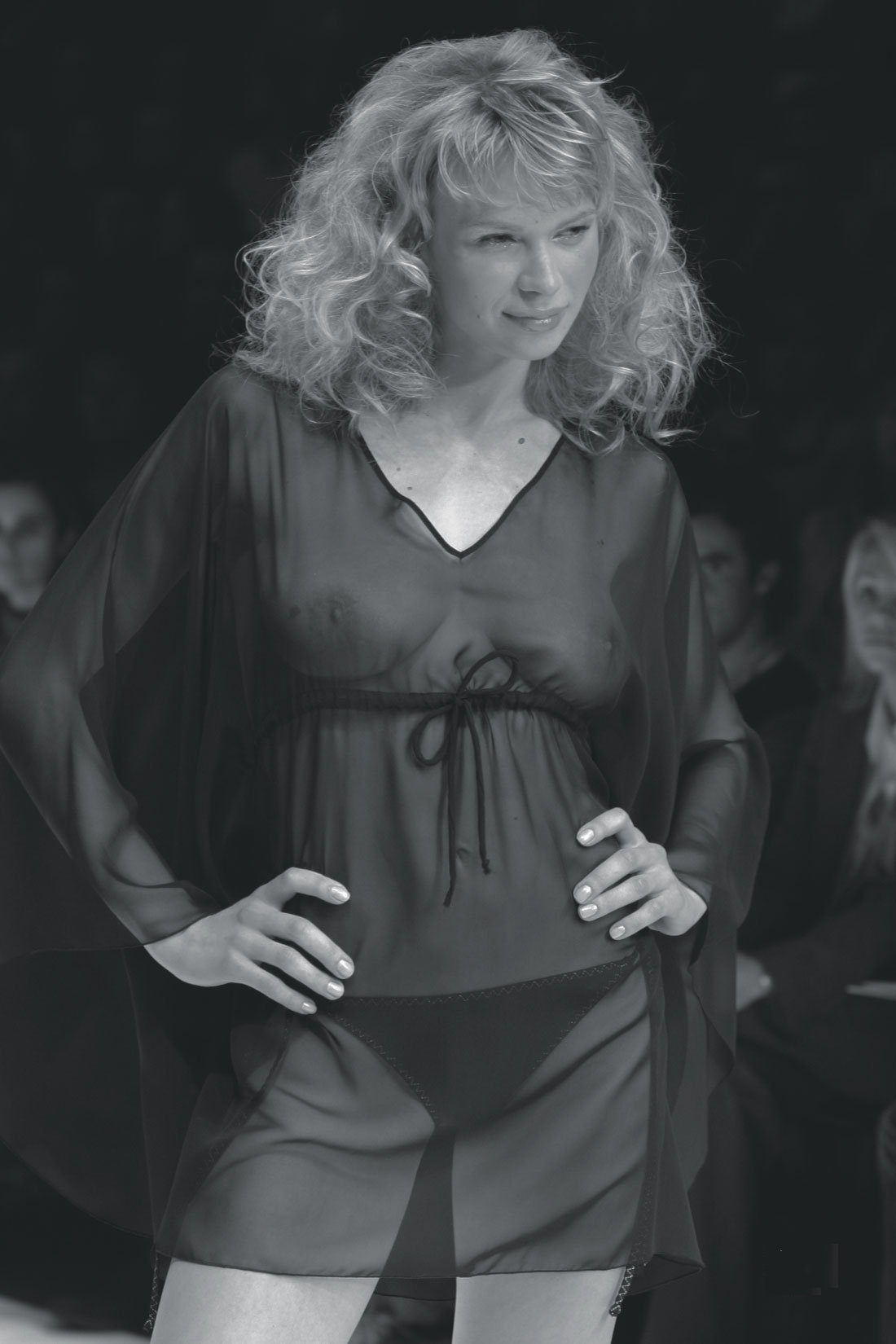
A ramp model showcasing a transparent dress at a fashion show in Portugal

See-through clothing (also known as naked dress) is any garment of clothing made with lace, mesh or sheer fabric that allows the wearer's body or undergarments to be seen through its fabric. See-through fabrics have been fashionable at various times in history, ranging from eighteenth-century Europe to the modern "sheer fashion trend" that started with designer clothing from 2008.

== Materials ==
Mesh, web, or net fabric may have many connected or woven pieces with many closely spaced holes and is frequently used for modern sports jerseys.

A sheer fabric is a thin cloth which is semi-transparent. These include chiffon, georgette, and gauze. Some are fine-denier knits used in tights, stockings, bodystockings, dancewear and lingerie. It can also be used in tops, pants, skirts, dresses, and gowns.

Latex rubber, which is naturally translucent, or plastic, can be made into clothing materials of any level of transparency. Clear plastic is typically only found in over-garments, such as raincoats. The use of translucent latex rubber for clothing can also be found in fetish clothing. Some materials become transparent when wet or when very bright light is shone on them, such as by a flashbulb.

== Terminology ==
The term "naked dress", originally used in the late 1930s for strapless gowns, became popular again in the late 1990s (fashion historian Kimberly Chrisman-Campbell attributes this to a 1998 episode of the HBO series Sex and the City where the words are applied disparagingly to the flesh-toned slip dress worn by the protagonist Carrie Bradshaw). By the 2020s it was applied to a variety of dresses (sheer, flesh-toned, skintight, or a combination of these) that were designed to reveal (or create an illusion of) little or no clothing worn underneath.

See-through or sheer fabric, particularly in skintone (called "nude") colours, is sometimes called illusion, as in "illusion bodice" (or sleeve) due to giving the impression of exposed flesh, or a revealing ensemble.

== 18th and 19th centuries ==
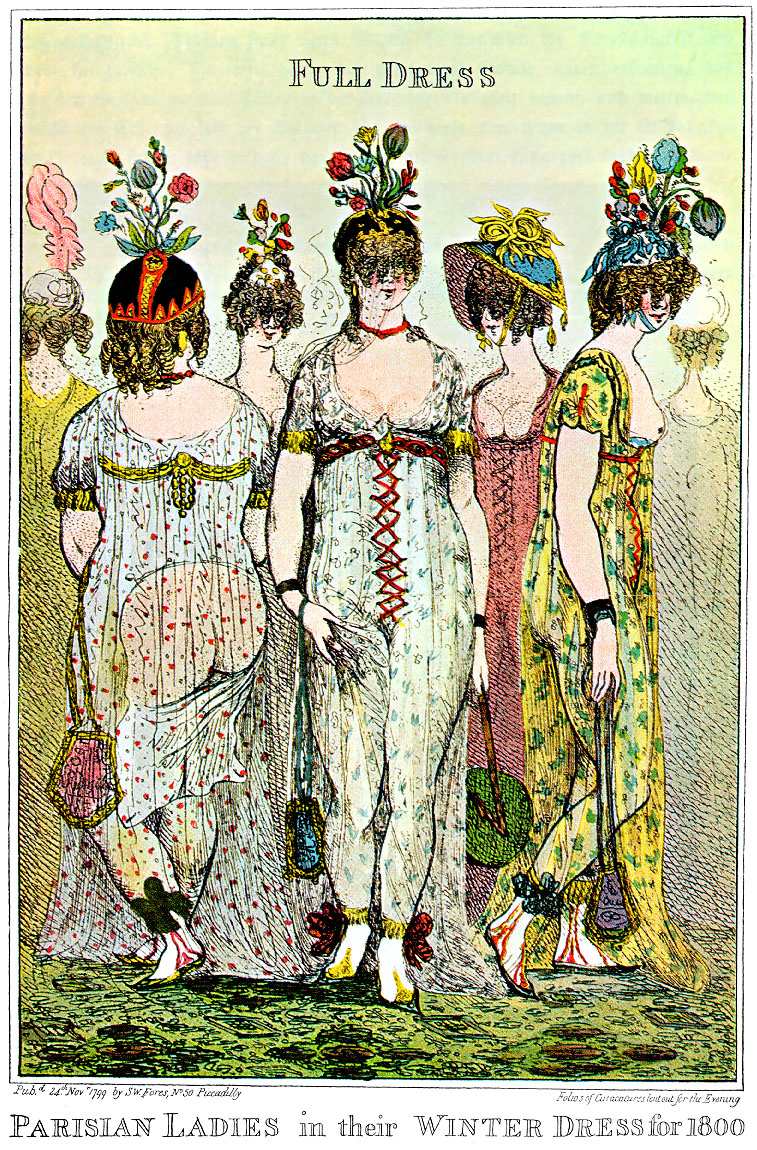
A 1799 caricature by Isaac Cruikshank satirising diaphanous styles worn in Paris

During the 1770s and 1780s, there was a fashion for wrap-over dresses, which were sometimes worn by actresses in Oriental roles. These were criticised by Horace Walpole among others, for resembling dressing gowns too closely, while others objected to their revealingly thin materials, such as silk gauze and muslin. In the 1780s the chemise à la Reine, as worn by Marie Antoinette in a notorious portrait of 1783 by Élisabeth Vigée Le Brun, became very popular. It was a filmy white muslin dress similar to the undergarment also called a chemise. In 1784 Abigail Adams visited Paris, where she was shocked to observe that fashionable Frenchwomen, including Madame Helvétius, favoured the more revealing and sheer versions of this gown.

By the end of the 1790s, Louis-Sébastien Mercier, observing the dress of Frenchwomen, noted that demi-mondaines were dressing in a manner he described as "a la sauvage", comprising a semi-sheer muslin gown worn only over a flesh-coloured bodystocking, with the breasts, arms, and feet bare. Mercier blamed the public display of nude or lightly draped statues for encouraging this immodesty.

In the very late 18th century and for the first decade of the 19th, neoclassical gowns made of lightweight translucent muslin were fashionable. As the fabric clung to the body, revealing what was beneath, it made nudity à la grecque a centrepiece of public spectacle. The concept of transparency in women's dress was often satirised by caricaturists of the day such as Isaac Cruikshank.

Throughout the 19th century, women's dresses, particularly for summer or evening wear, often featured transparent fabrics. However, these were almost always lined or worn over opaque undergarments or an underdress so that the wearer's modesty was preserved.

=== Gallery ===
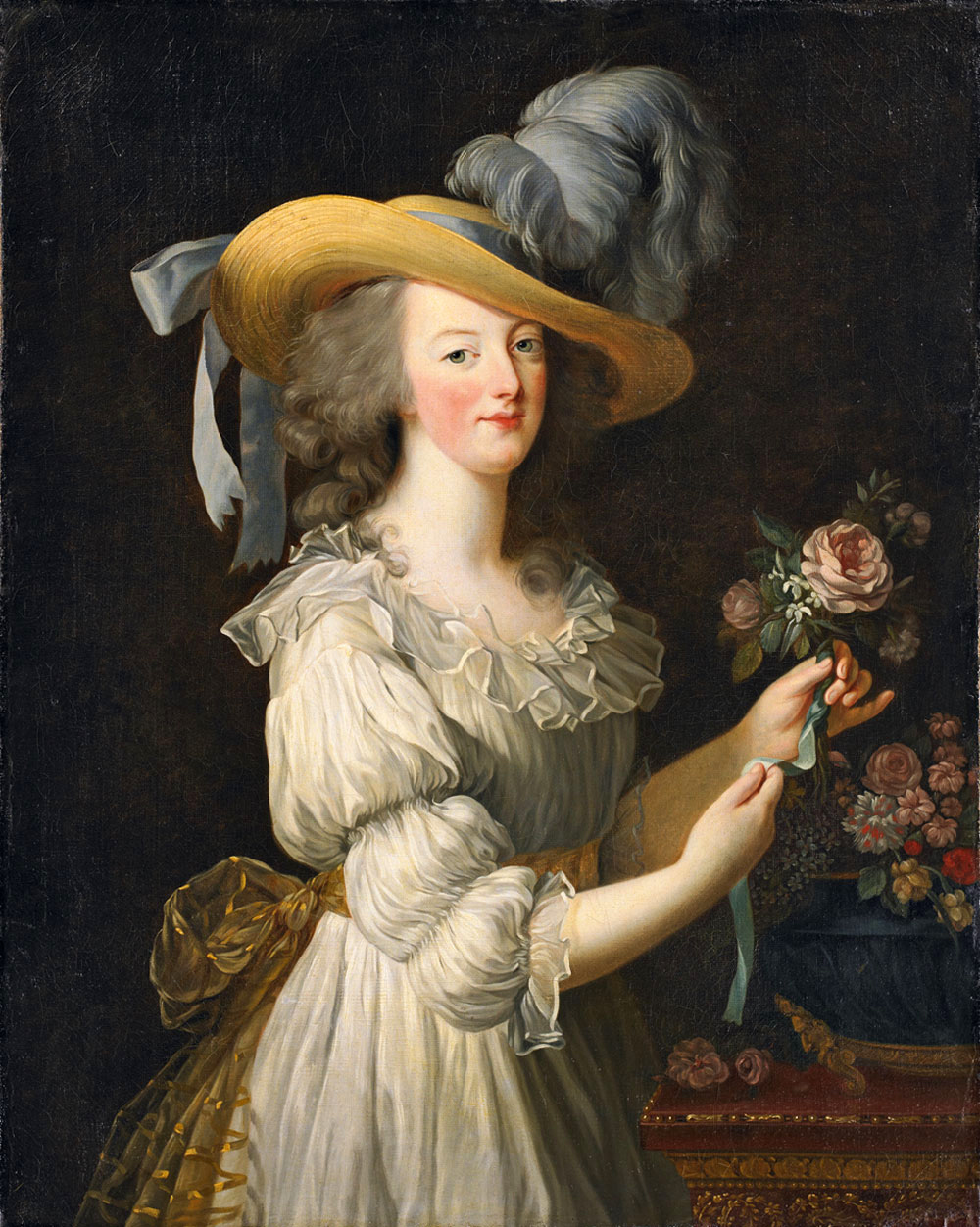
1. 1783

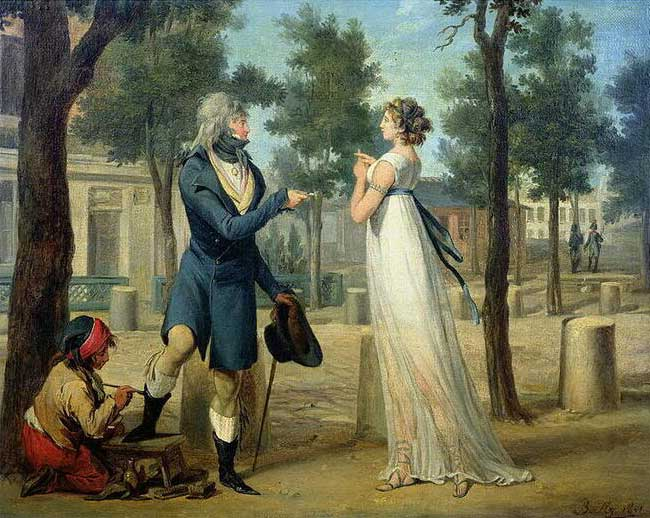
2. c. 1797

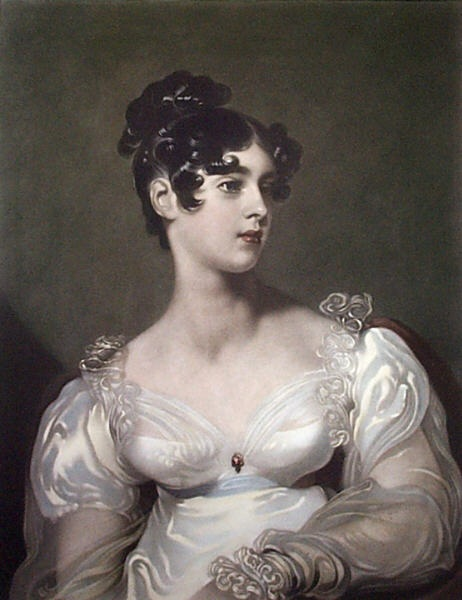
3. 1818

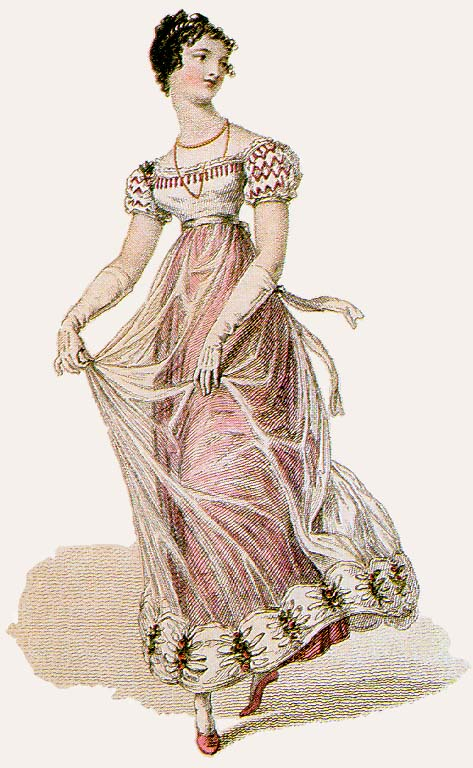
4. 1823

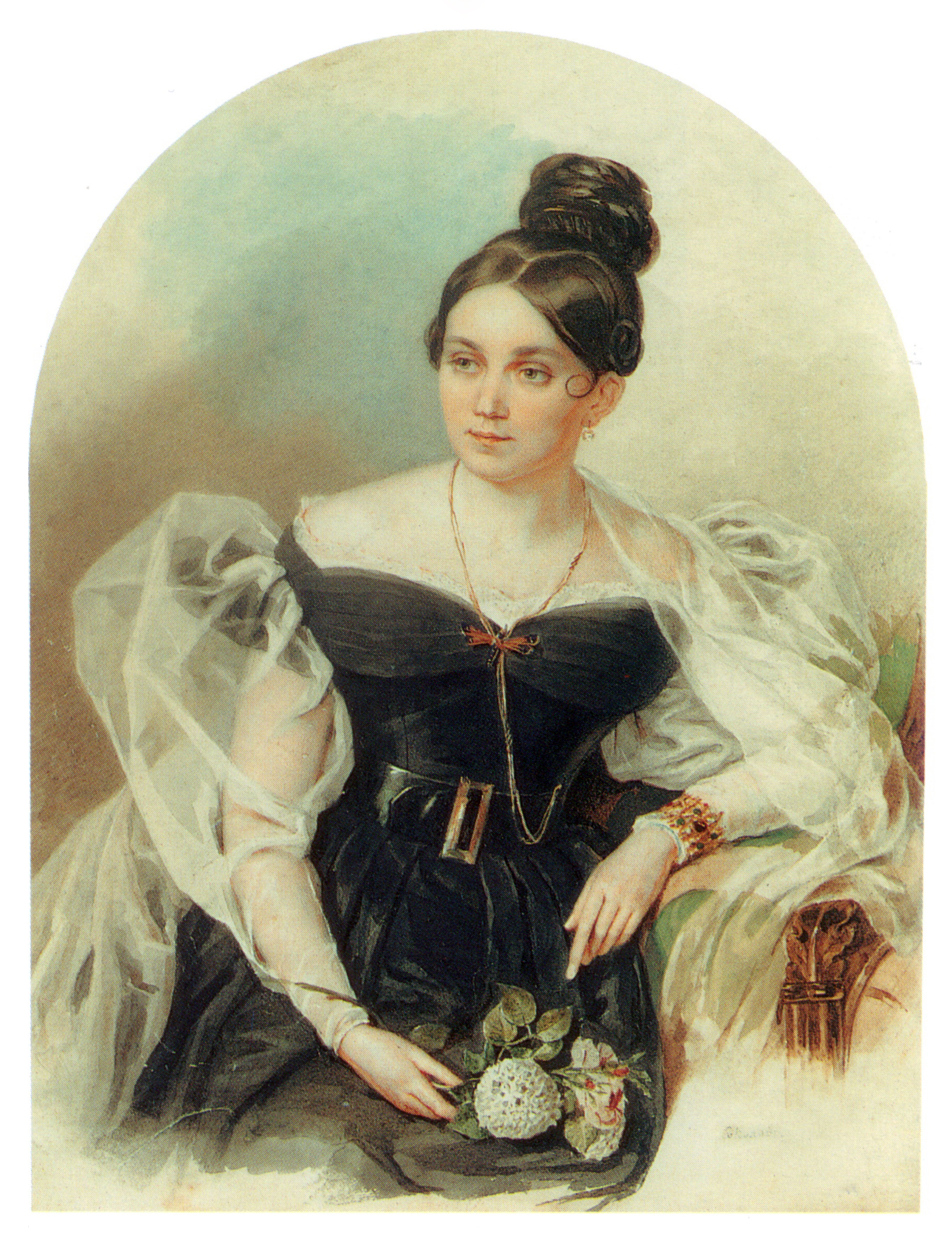
5. 1831–2

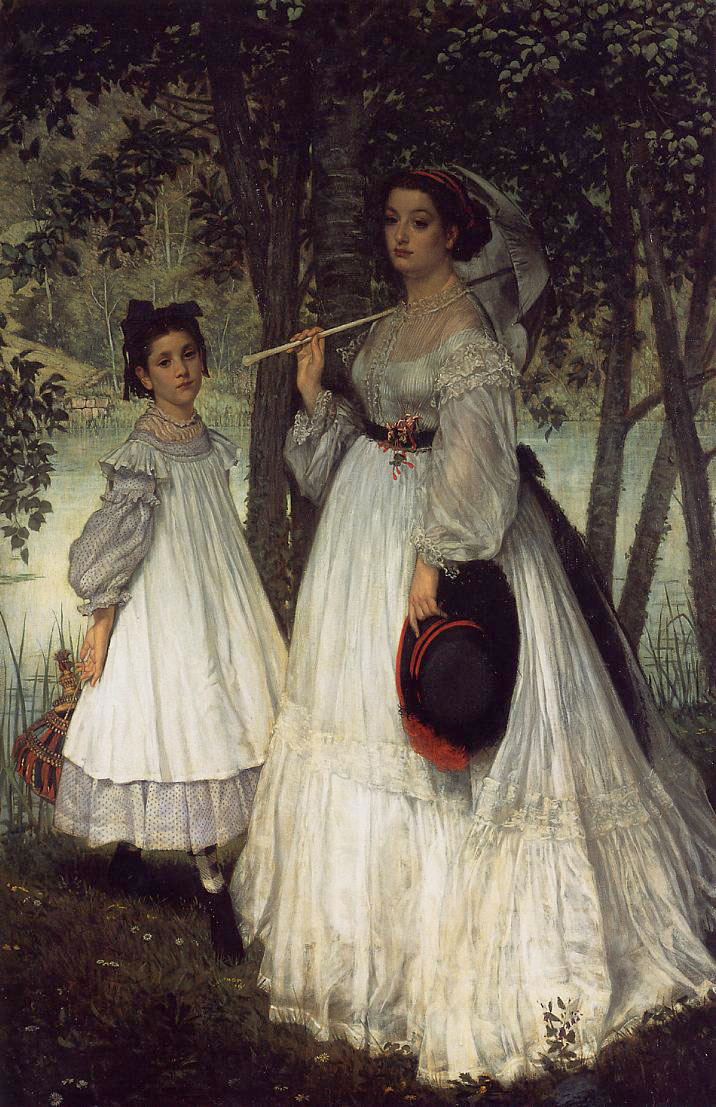
6. 1863

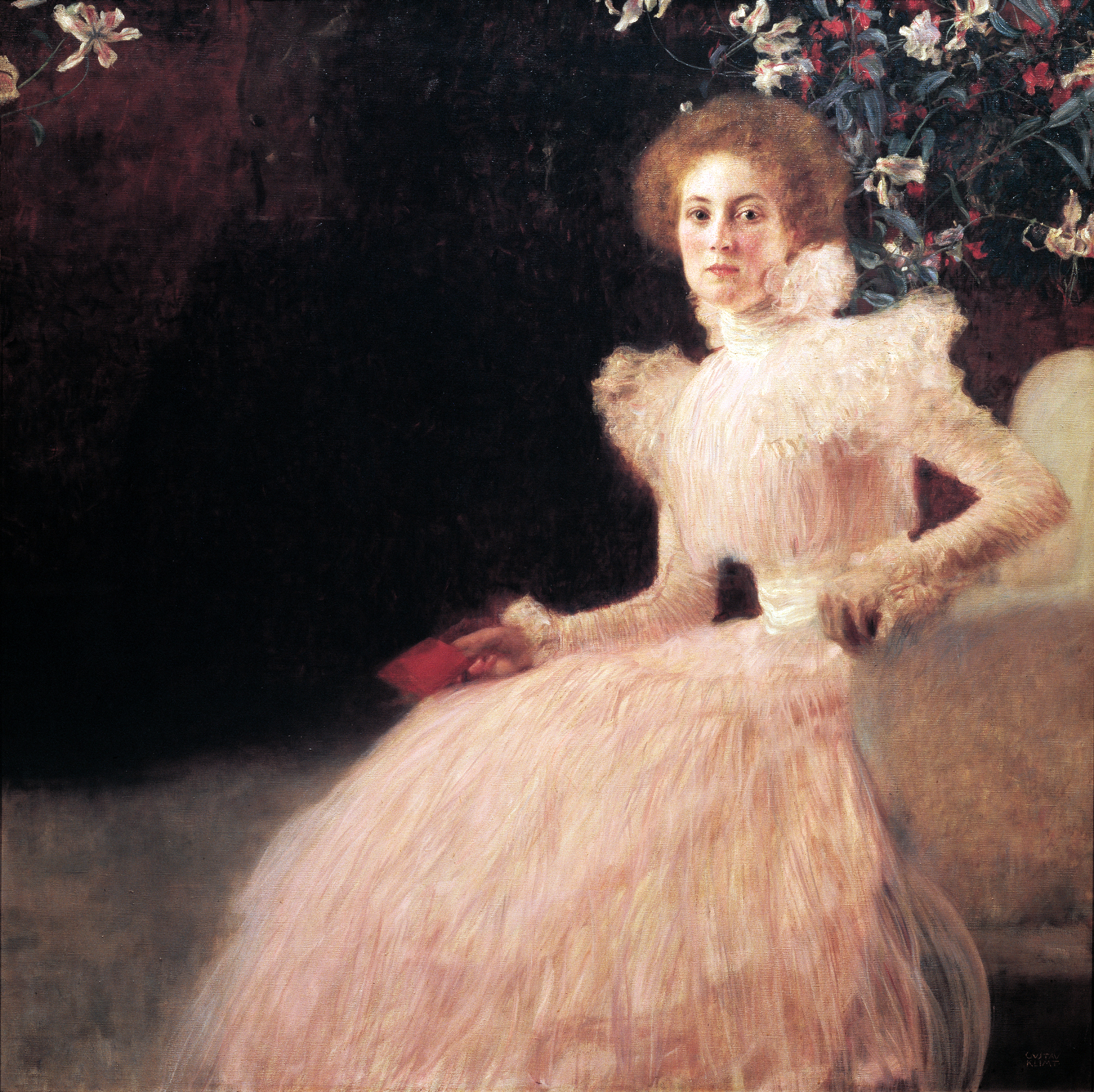
7. 1898
1. Marie Antoinette in a Muslin Dress, or Chemise a la Reine, by Vigée Le Brun
2. Point de Convention or Absolutely no agreement by Louis-Léopold Boilly. An Incroyable is shown propositioning a woman dressed a la sauvage
3. Portrait of Lady Elizabeth Leveson-Gower, showing a sheer gauze overdress with long sleeves over a white silk underdress.
4. Fashion plate showing a ball dress of sheer material over a pink underdress.
5. Portrait of Elena Chertkova Stroganova in a black satin dress with transparent white gauze sleeves.
6. The Two Sisters by James Tissot showing a muslin summer dress with a transparent bodice clearly showing the arms and a low-necked camisole.
7. Portrait of Sonja Knips by Gustav Klimt. Afternoon dress in densely gathered sheer pink chiffon over a solid foundation lining.

== 20th century ==
=== 1900s–1910s ===
A fashionable garment in the early 20th century was the "peekaboo waist", a blouse made from broderie anglaise or sheer fabric, which led to complaints that flesh could be seen through the eyelets in the embroidery or through the thin fabric. In 1913 the so-called "x-ray dress", defined as a woman's dress that was considered to be too sheer or revealing, caused similar consternation. In August that year, the chief of police of Los Angeles stated his intention to recommend a law banning women from wearing the "diaphanous" x‑ray dress on the streets. H. Russell Albee, the mayor of Portland, Oregon, ordered the arrest of any woman caught wearing an x‑ray dress on the street, which was defined as a gown cut too low at the neck or split to the knee. The following year, Jean-Philippe Worth, designer for the renowned Paris couture House of Worth, had a client object to the thickness of the taffeta lining of her dress, which was described as "thinner than a cigarette paper". Worth stated that using an even thinner, sheerer lining fabric would have had the effect of an "x-ray dress".

In Australia, an article was published in The Daily Telegraph on the 24 November 1913 strongly opposed to "freak dresses" and "peek-a-boo blouses" that had lately become the fashion in "other Capitals". The editorial complains of dresses of "exiguous transparency and undue scantiness" and "the low-cut blouse that invites pneumonia".

=== Mid-century Hollywood ===
Sheer evening gowns designed to give the impression of nudity underneath, originally used in burlesque, became popular in Hollywood costume design of the mid-20th century, with studio lighting well-controlled to avoid being truly revealing. Costume designers including Walter Plunkett, Edith Head and Irene all produced sheer gowns for the screen. The French-born costume designer Jean Louis termed such garments "illusion dresses"; he made a series of them (covered in strategically placed sequins, beads and lace) for Marlene Dietrich's cabaret concerts, including a heavily beaded gown for her 1958 engagement at the Sahara in Las Vegas, which her publicist promoted as a $25,000 "diamond-studded" creation although, according to the fashion historian Kimberly Chrisman-Campbell, it cost closer to $8,000 and contained no diamonds. Orry-Kelly designed for Marilyn Monroe's part in Some Like It Hot (1959) a tight cocktail dress made of nude-colored silk jersey and black soufflé. Black sequins, beads and fringe were used for accents. Strategically sewn onto sheer décolletage sequins barely covered Monroe's nipples, and a deep cutout in the back went to the top of her buttocks.

Monroe subsequently commissioned Jean Louis to design the gown in which she sang "Happy Birthday, Mr. President" to John F. Kennedy at Madison Square Garden on 19 May 1962: a floor-length dress of sheer, flesh-coloured marquisette decorated with 2,500 rhinestones, worn without undergarments and so snug that one had to be sewn into it while dressing. Chrisman-Campbell identifies the occasion as the moment the naked dress entered the fashion mainstream.

=== 1960s ===
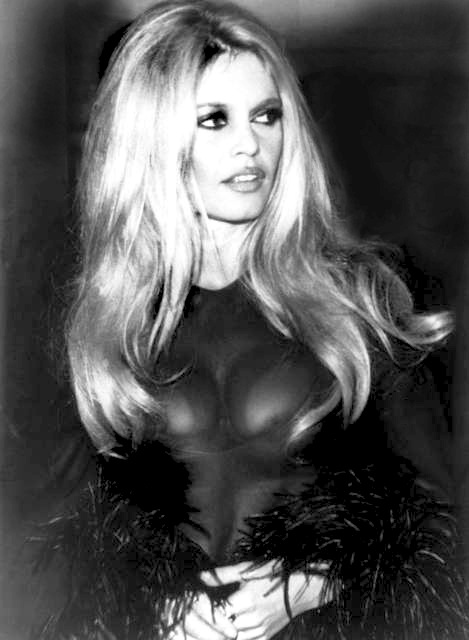
Actress Brigitte Bardot in a transparent top, 1968

See-through and transparent clothing became very fashionable in the latter part of the 1960s. In 1964 the actress Carroll Baker, borrowing (with permission) an idea from her friend Dietrich, asked the couturier Pierre Balmain for a see-through gown of net and chiffon covered with jewels; she wore it, with nothing underneath, to the Hollywood premiere of The Carpetbaggers. By Baker's account, the skin-toned net made her look bare under the lights, and pictures of the dress appeared in newspapers worldwide. Balmain predicted at the time that "the new look will be transparent".

In 1967, Missoni presented a show at the Palazzo Pitti in Florence, where Rosita Missoni noticed the models' bras showed through their knit dresses and requested they remove them. However, under the catwalk lights, the garments became unexpectedly transparent, revealing nude breasts beneath. The see-through look was subsequently presented by Yves Saint Laurent the following year, and in London, Ossie Clark presented sheer chiffon dresses intended to be worn without underwear. Other designers of the period also worked with see-through materials: André Courrèges used clear plastic and netting in his Space Age designs; Saint Laurent's 1967 collection included a sheer black chiffon gown with ostrich feathers around the hips; Oscar de la Renta put sheer organza and chiffon blouses in his Spring/Summer 1969 collection; and Zandra Rhodes made loose, sheer chiffon maxi dresses. The trend led to jewellery designers such as Daniel Stoenescu at Cadoro creating "body jewellery" to be worn with sheer blouses and low-cut dresses. Stoenescu designed metal filigree "breastplates" inspired by a statue of Venus found at Pompeii, which functioned like a brassiere and were designed to be visible through the transparent shirts while preserving the wearer's modesty.

=== 1970s ===
In 1971 Norman Hartnell, best known as dressmaker to Queen Elizabeth II, showed a black crêpe evening gown, named "Sideshow", that was open along one side from ankle to waist, with lacing across the gap. According to Chrisman-Campbell, however, mainstream fashion turned away from sheer styles in the 1970s: hemlines came down, evening wear stayed close-fitting but covered, and openly see-through dresses were again mostly worn by entertainers. Bob Mackie, a costume designer who took Old Hollywood stars as his models and counted Dietrich among his clients, made a series of sheer, beaded outfits for Cher. She wore one of them (a beaded gown trimmed with white feathers, first worn to the 1974 Met Gala) on a cover of Time later that year, photographed by Richard Avedon. Mackie later said that the issue quickly sold out, that some cities banned its sale, and that in Tampa the image was judged pornographic.

Punk rock artist Patti Smith wears a see-through slip inside-out on the cover of her 1978 album Easter.

=== 1990s ===
The naked dress returned in the 1990s, a decade of pared-down, body-conscious fashion. In 1993 the model Kate Moss went to an Elite model agency party in London in a silver slip dress by Liza Bruce, worn over black briefs; the borrowed dress was fully transparent, which Moss later said she had not noticed when putting it on. The fashion curator Colleen Hill has read the dress as part of the decade's move away from the groomed perfection of the 1980s supermodels and toward something more real. The Oxford English Dictionary traces the first appearance in print of the term "side boob" to a January 1994 interview with the comedian Mike Myers; in the same year, Elizabeth Hurley wore her Versace safety-pin dress.

== 21st-century fashion ==
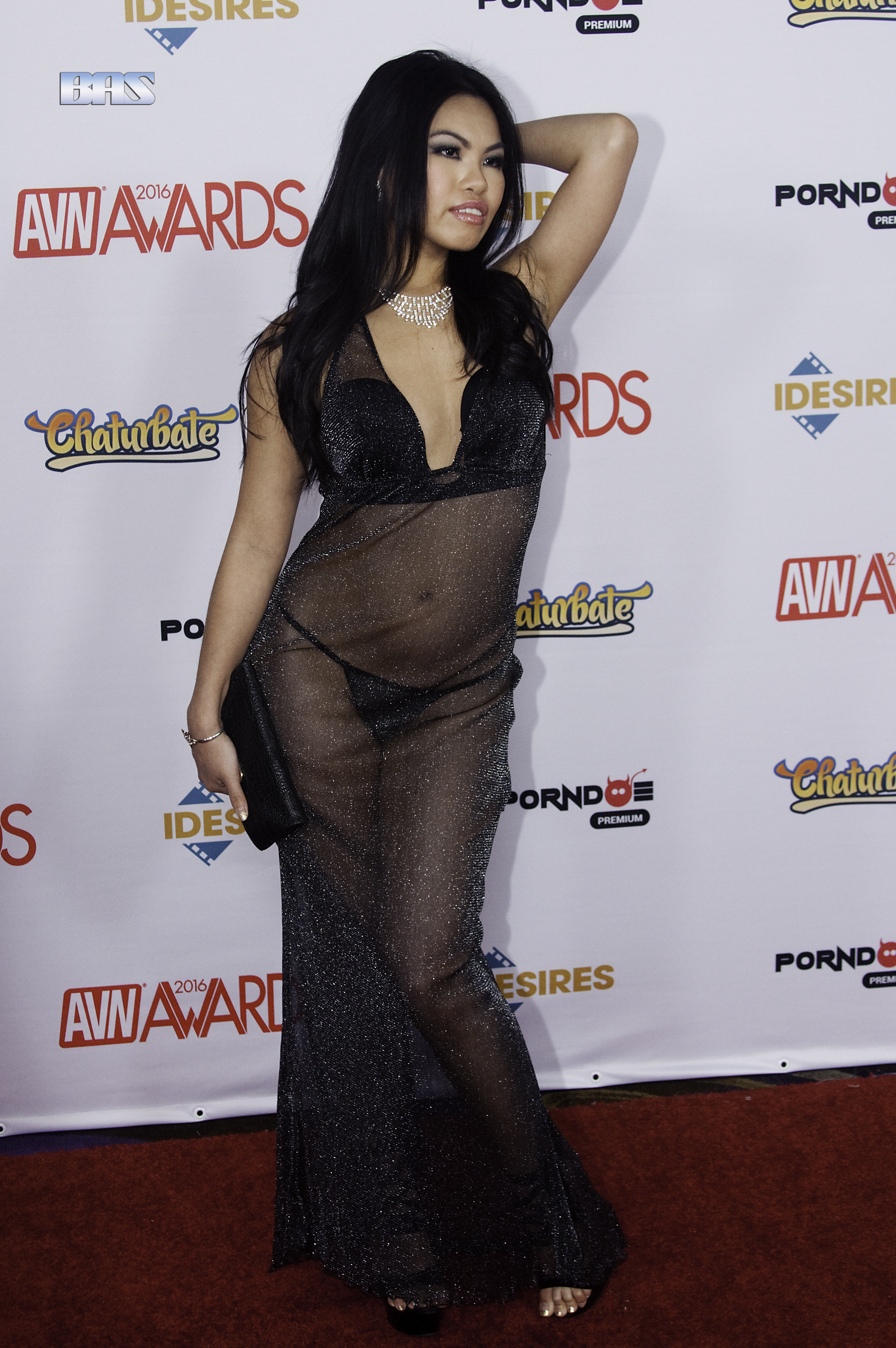
An actress on red carpet in a see-through dress

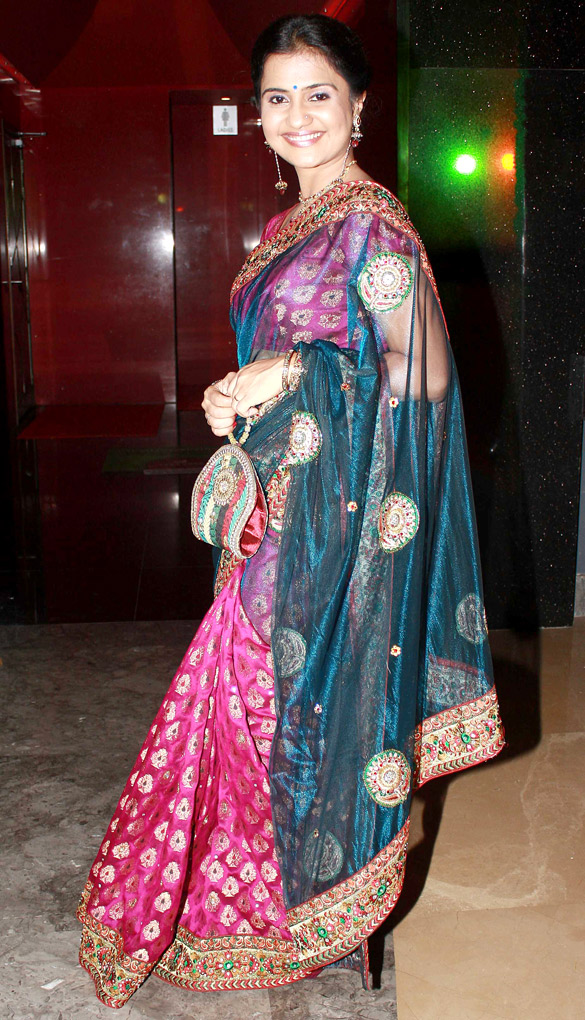
A Bollywood actress in a transparent sari, 2012

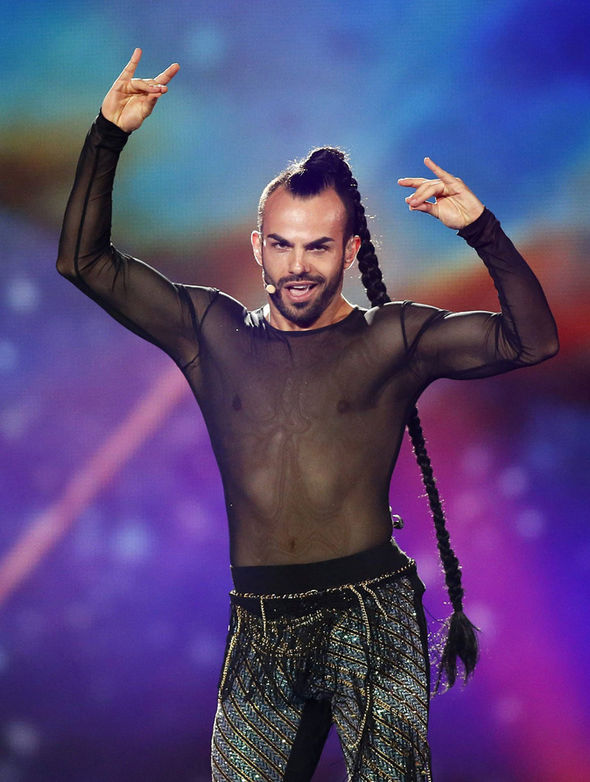
Singer Slavko Kalezić in a see-through top, 2017

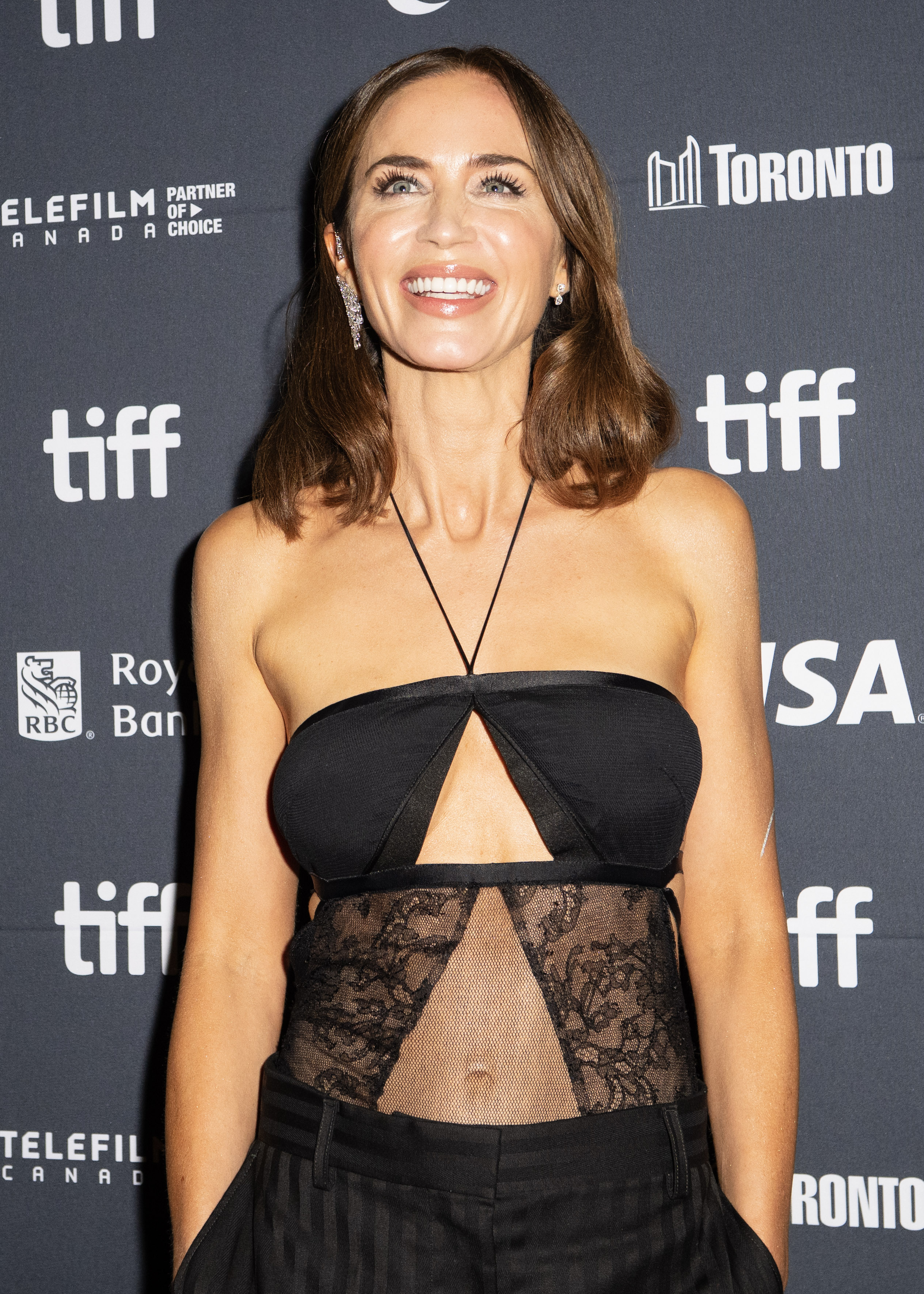
Actress Emily Blunt in a see-through-lingerie inspired top which bares the navel, 2025

The green silk Versace gown that Jennifer Lopez wore to the 2000 Grammy Awards, sheer and held closed by a citrine brooch and double-sided tape, create the largest volume of searches on Google at the time, according to Eric Schmidt, then head of Google. Google created an image search tool, released in July 2001 as Google Images.

See-through materials of various kinds continue to be available for a wide range of clothing styles. Since 2006, haute couture runways have heavily featured see-through fabrics. This use of see-through fabrics as a common element in designer clothing resulted in the "sheer fashion trend" that has been predominant in fashion circles since 2008. In the 2010s, naked dresses became a regular sight on red carpets. At the 2025 Vanity Fair Oscar party, many of the female celebrities wore sheer "naked dresses", mostly combined with various items of visible underwear.

== See also ==
- Fishnet
- Lace
- Plastic clothing
- Stockings

== Sources ==
- Chrisman-Campbell, Kimberly (2022). "The Naked Dress: Daring to Bare". Skirts: Fashioning Modern Femininity in the Twentieth Century (First ed.). New York: St. Martin's Press. pp. 144–159. ISBN 978-1-250-27579-0.

</wikitext>
