= Ninon =

Lightweight, transparent sheer fabric

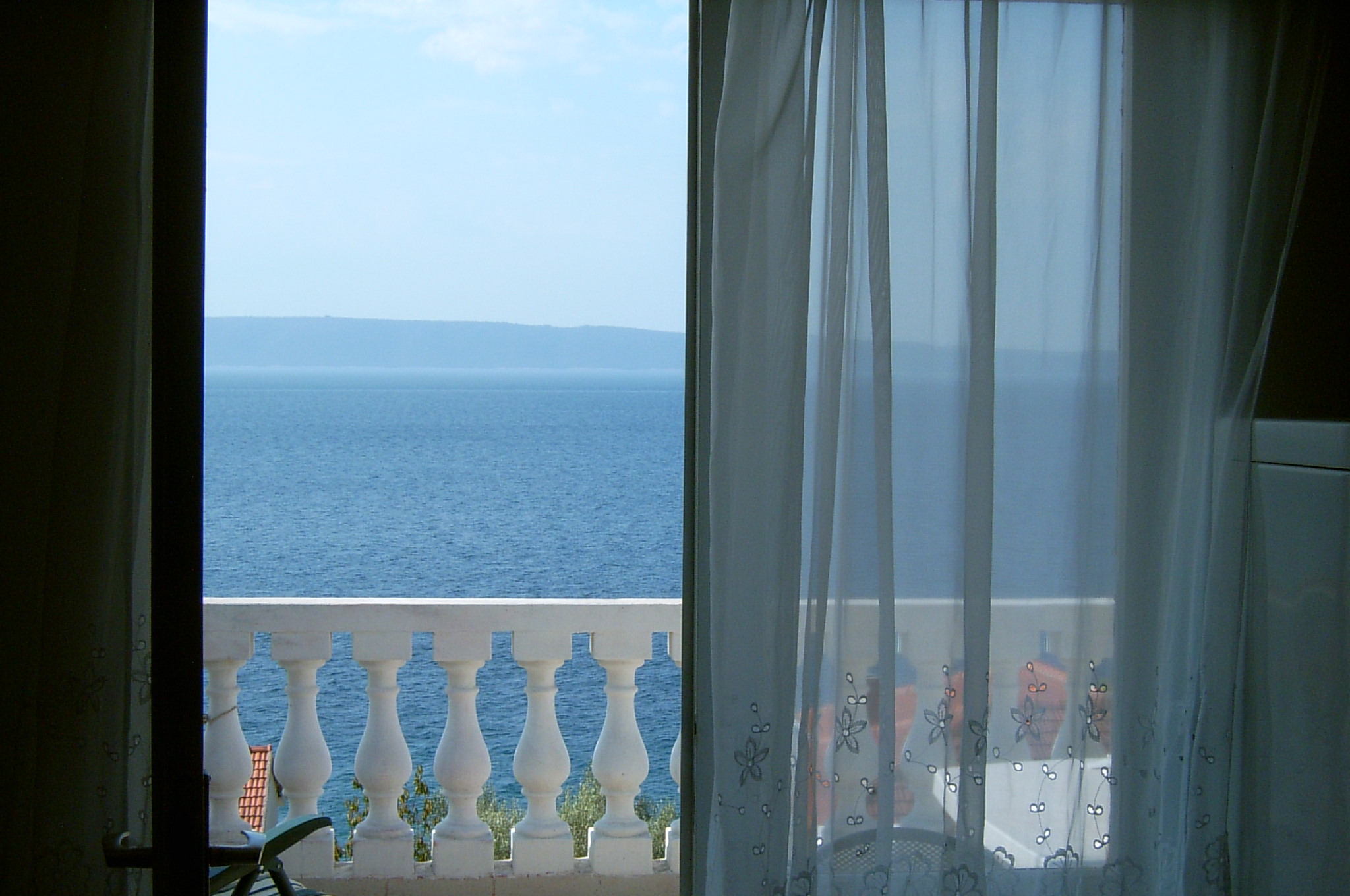
Sheer curtains

Ninon is a lightweight, sheer fabric made with plain or leno weaving. It is a suitable material for curtains, evening wear and lingerie. Ninon is made with variety of filament yarns such as polyester, silk, rayon or nylon.

== History ==
Ninon is a French derivation from the name Anne. Originally it was made from highly twisted silk yarns, gradually changed to synthetic yarns such as rayon. In the early 20th century (1909), the Ninon silk was in use for dresses also.

=== Types ===
Initially there were two types of Ninons, single and double. The difference was with the number of ply or the twisted yarns used in weaving: one, two, or three. The finest and single Ninons are more popular.

== Structure and characteristics ==
Ninon is a lightweight sheer material with good draping qualities. It is very thin and has a surface with a mild sheen. Ninon has an open mesh-like appearance and a crisp hand feel. Ninon has more transparency similar to Marquisette in comparison to its peers such as voile, lace and batiste which are little opaque. Ninon is soft like Marquisette, voile, lace and batiste. For better strength polyester is considered as a preferred yarn for Ninon.

It is made in a variety of tight smooth weaves, open lacy patterns. It is described as very delicate or lightweight and is sometimes referred to as "French tergal". It is available in a variety of solid colors and tone-on-tone woven vertical stripes. Some ninon fabrics have embroidered borders.

== Use ==
Ninon is mostly used in drapery and curtains. It is also used in blouses, bodice, dresses such as evening wear and in certain lingerie.

== Care ==
Ninon products are advised to line dry and iron while they hold moisture (in the semi-dry stage)

== See also ==
- Casement cloth
- Marquisette
