= Voile =

Lightweight, sheer, plain-weave fabric made of various fibers

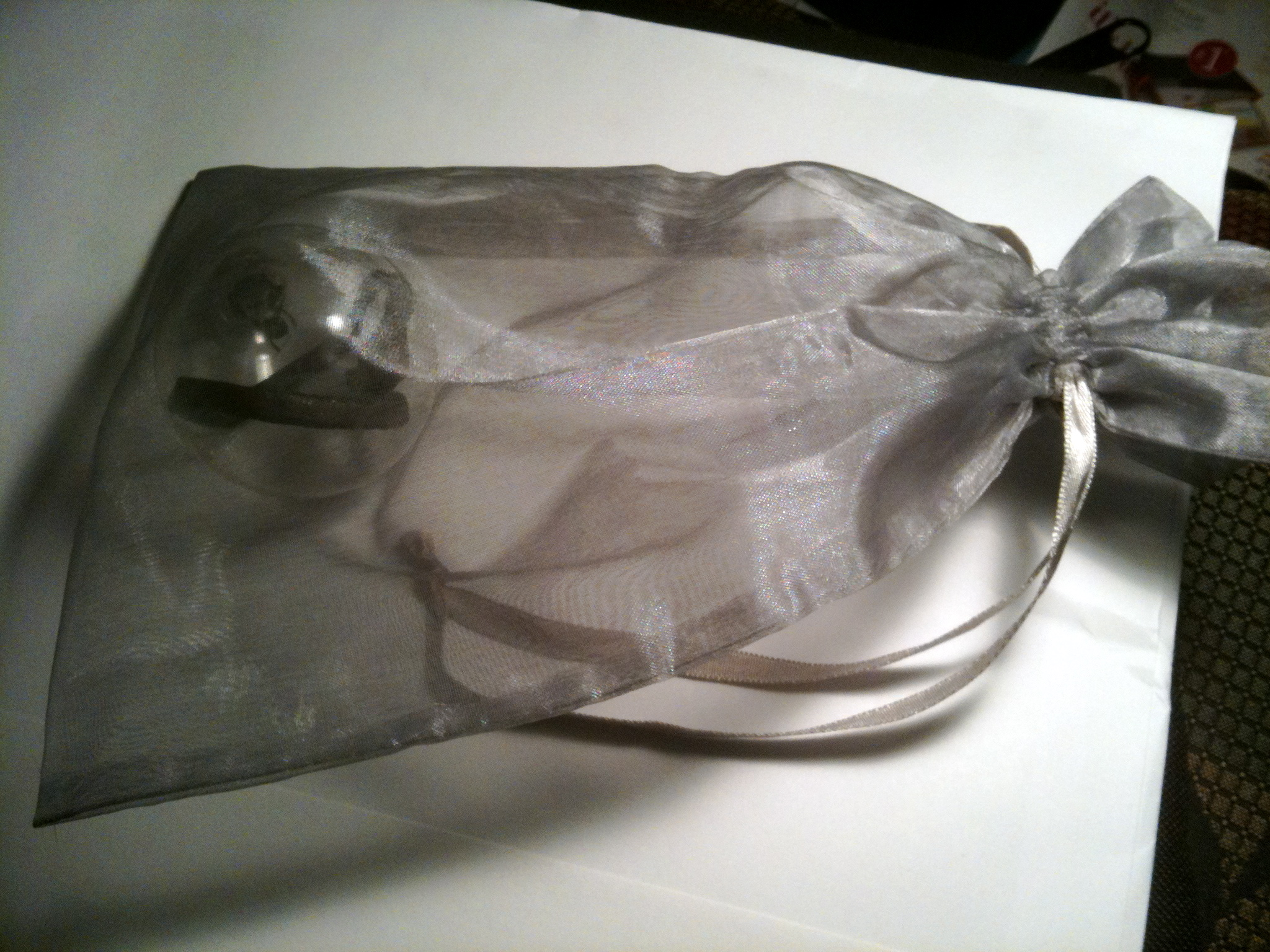
Light bulb in a voile safety bag

Voile (/ˈvɔɪl/; French for veil) is a soft, sheer fabric, usually made of 99% cotton or cotton blended with linen or polyester. Named for its light weight, the fabric is mostly used in soft furnishing. In tropical climates, voile is used for window treatments and mosquito nets. When used as curtain material, voile is similar to net curtains.

Voiles are available in a range of patterns and colours. Because of their semitransparent quality, voile curtains are made using heading tape that is less easily noticeable through the fabric. Voile fabric is also used in dressmaking, either in multiple layers or laid over a second material. It is similar to chiffon.

== Material types ==
Light-penetrable sheer fabrics include voile, muslin, and lace. These can be broadly divided into two groups based on method of production. The first are the natural fibers such as cotton and silk. The second group is prepared from a man-made fiber. This kind of synthetic sheer is extracted from raw material such as wood pulp or petroleum. They are robust and sturdy, yet still delicate looking, and tend to take dye well. They are often used as window dressing as they fall into soft folds that are appropriate for scarf swags. In music, a voile refers to the cloth used to muffle a drum.

== See also ==
- Marquisette
- Organza
