= Gauze =

Thin translucent fabric with an open weave

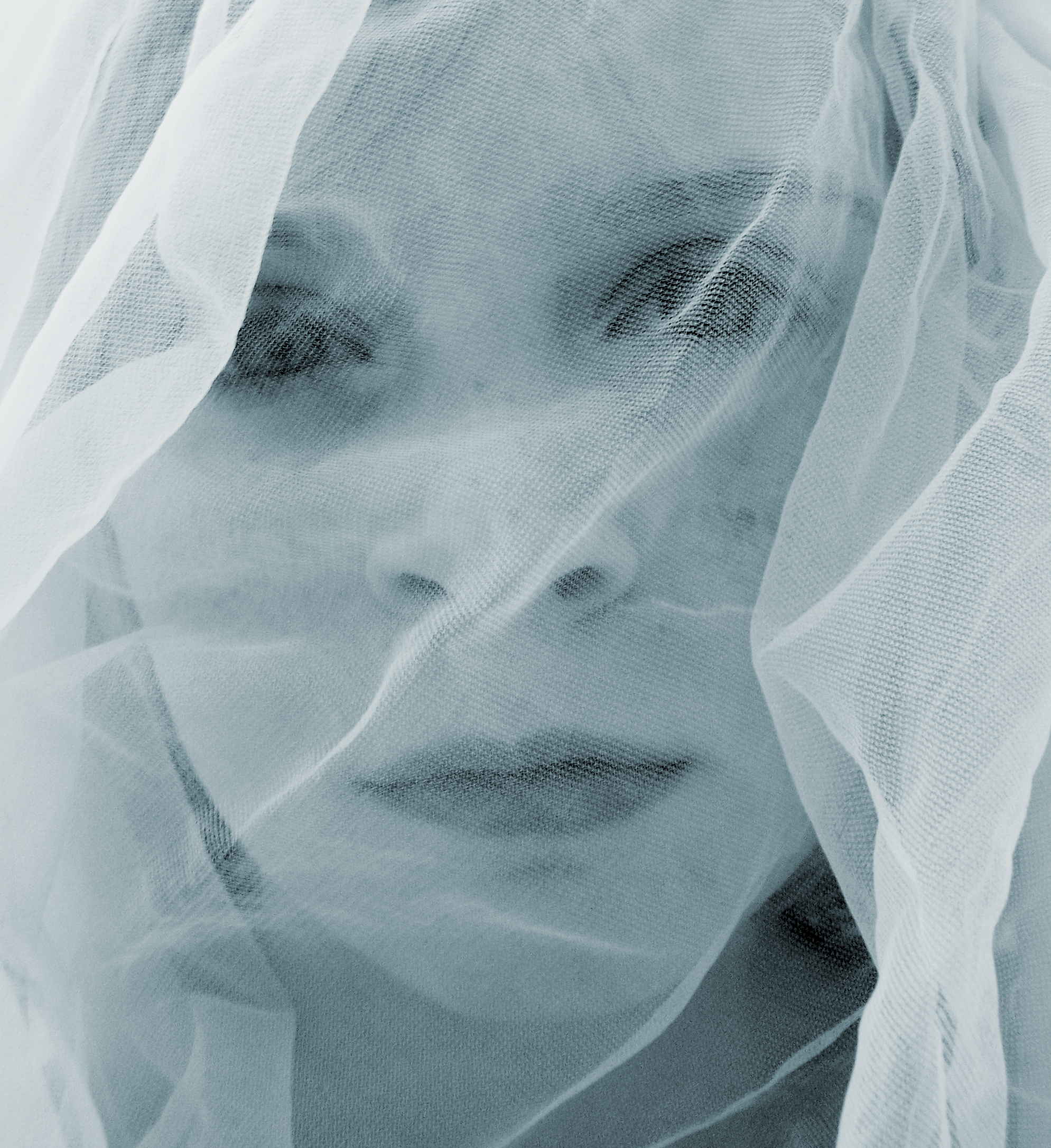
Gauze veil

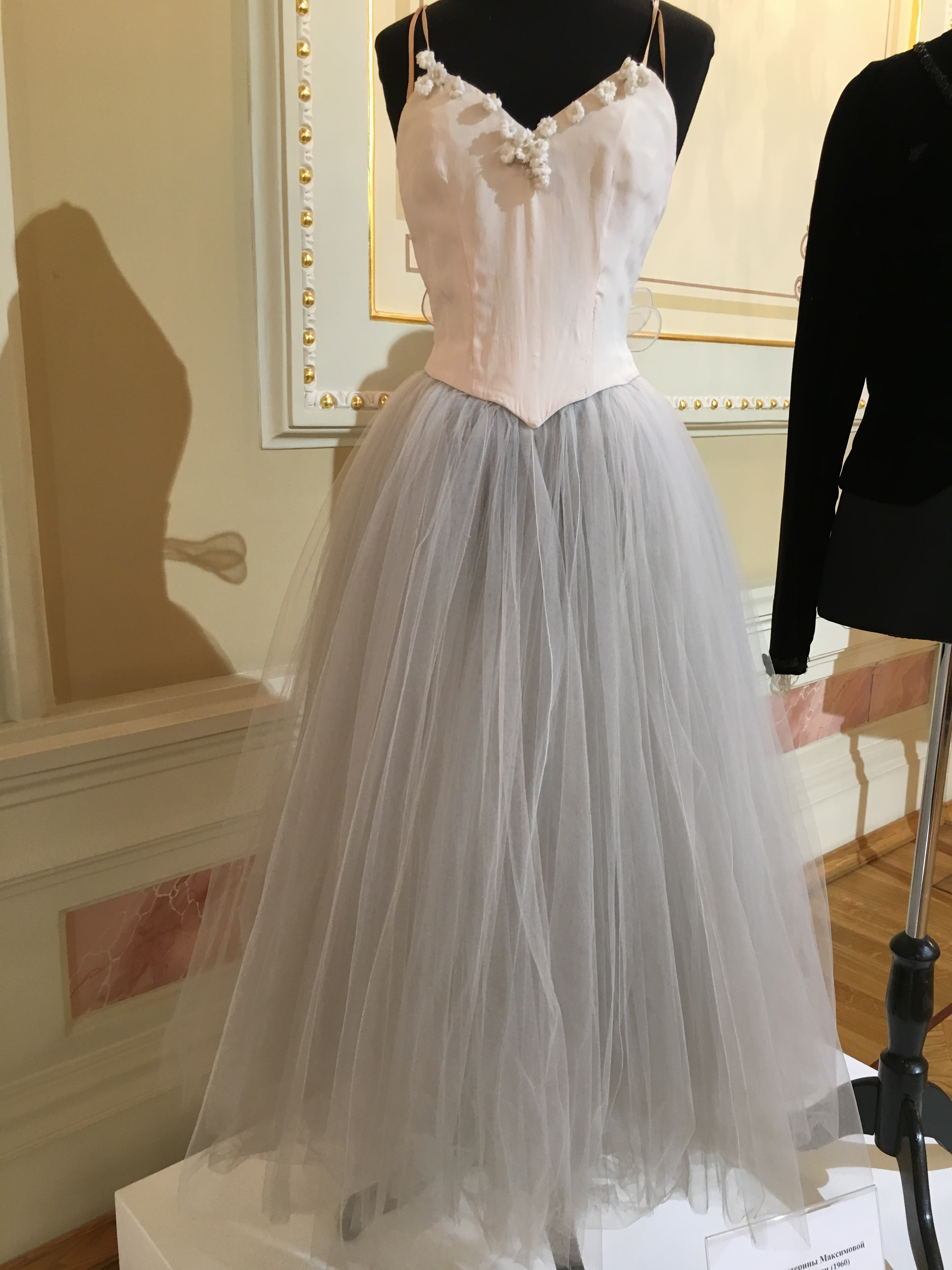
Tutu

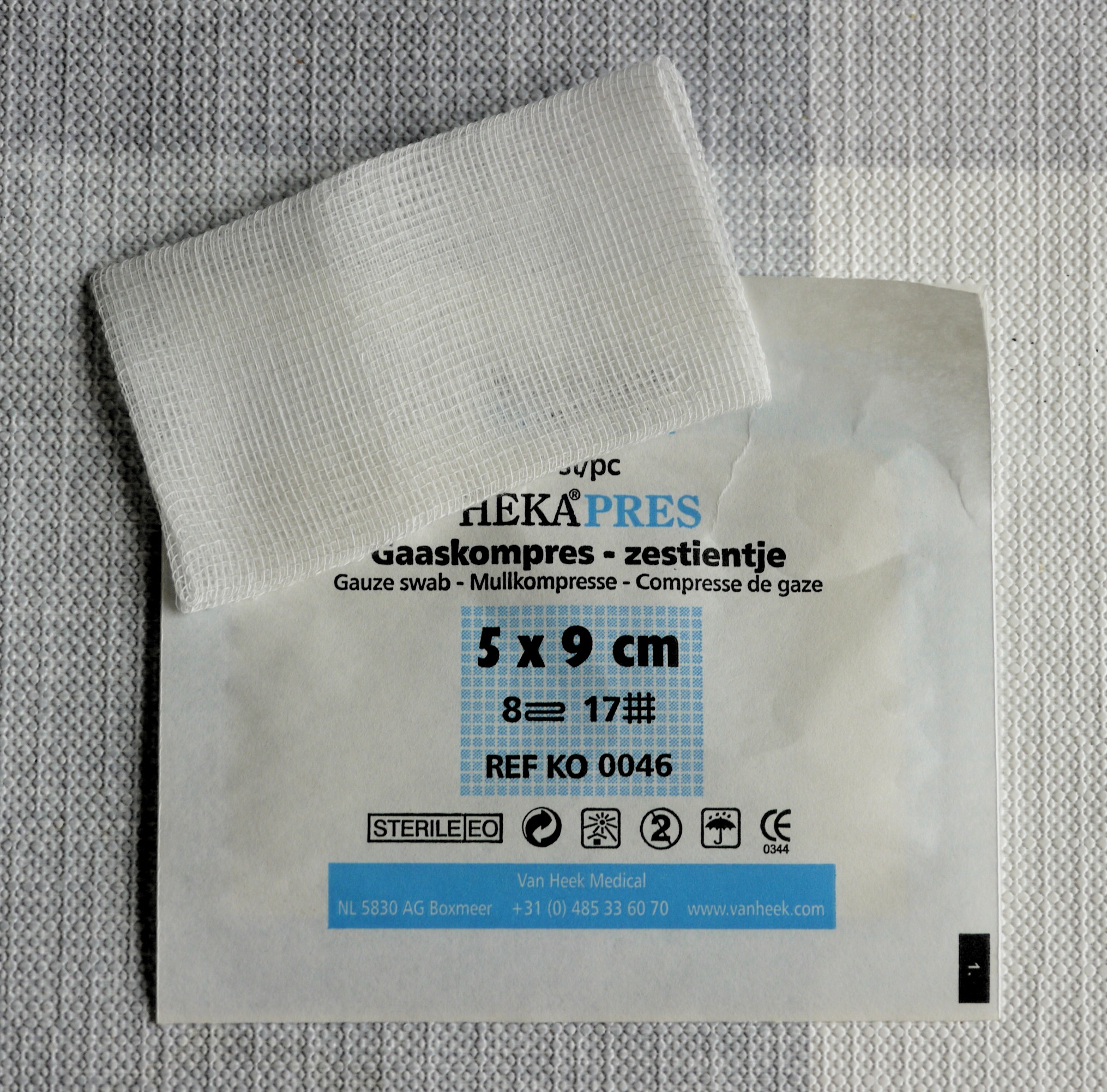
Gauze swab

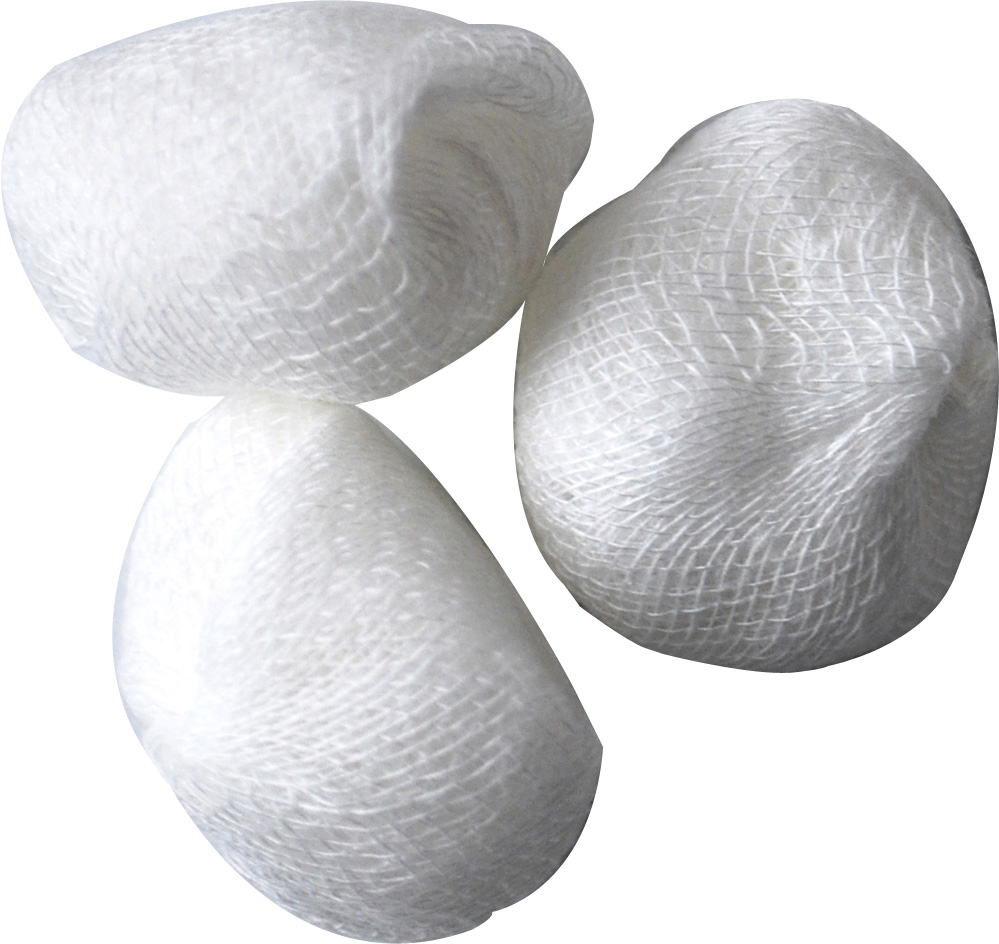
Gauze balls

Gauze is a thin, translucent fabric with a loose open weave. In technical terms, "gauze" is a weave structure in which the weft yarns are arranged in pairs and are crossed before and after each warp yarn, keeping the weft firmly in place. This weave structure is used to add stability to the fabric, which is important when using fine yarns loosely spaced. However, this weave structure can be used with any weight of yarn, and can be seen in some rustic textiles made from coarse hand-spun plant fiber yarns. Gauze is widely used for medical dressings.

Gauze can also be made of non-woven fabric.

== Etymology and history ==
The English word for "gauze" has long been popularly believed to come from the place name, Gaza (Arabic: غزة ghazza). It is attributed by most scholars to have come from Gaza and/or qazz (Arabic: قز, "raw silk"), likely by way of the French gaze. Gaza has a long history of textile production and export, and many fabrics are named for the places from which they were imported.

The production of gauze in Gaza is first described by Pliny the Elder (c. 23-79) in his book Natural History. At this time, China had a monopoly on sericulture and the local production of silk fabrics in Gaza relied on imported silk yarn and fabric, wound and rewound, to make "a thin gauze" which Pliny speculated was "produced for the purpose of exposing to the public eye naked draperies and transparent matrons." By the Middle Ages, Arab traders had imported Asian silkworms (dudat al-qazz) to Palestine and sericulture was undertaken domestically in nearby Ascalon, as well as silk weaving both there and in Gaza. A particular type of coarse silk fabric mixed with wool and produced in Palestine was called qazz and bi-harir (meaning "in/of silk"), and a thin, almost transparent version of it was used in clothing, drapery and even as medical dressings. Exported from Gaza's port to various destinations in Europe, it also came to be known as gaze there.

Alternate theories on the origins of the word include one by Ottorino Piangiani, who in 1903 traced the word gauze to a Norman word for a fine-leafed plant, and Demetrios Moutsos, who in 1983, proposed the dialectal Greek word khassa (χάσσα, "skin; thick garment") as a possible source for the Middle French word gaze and its diffusion into other languages, including English.

== Uses and types ==
Gauze was originally made of silk and was used for clothing. Gauze weave uses a leno weave. It has since been used for many other things, including gauze sponges for medical purposes. Modern gauze is plain weave and may be made of synthetic fibers, especially when used in clothing.

=== Medical use ===
Woven gauze made of linen was used to wrap the bodies of Ancient Egyptians in the mummification process before burial and is one of the oldest dressings for wounds. Modern medical gauze may be woven or non-woven. Woven gauze is loosely woven, usually from cotton fibers, allowing absorption or wicking of exudate and other fluids. Gauze can be woven with fine or coarse mesh; coarse gauze is useful for medical debridement, while fine gauze is better for packing wounds. Woven gauze is less absorbent than non-woven, and may leave lint in a wound, especially if cut.

Non-woven gauze is made from fibers that are pressed together rather than woven, providing better absorbency and wicking than woven gauze. Non-woven gauze is usually made from synthetic fibers such as rayon or polyester, or a blend which may include cotton. Non-woven gauze is stronger, bulkier and softer than woven gauze, and produces less lint.

When used as a medical dressing, woven gauze is usually made of cotton. It is especially useful for dressing wounds where other fabrics might stick to a burn or laceration. Many modern medical gauzes are covered with a perforated plastic film such as Telfa or a polyblend which prevents direct contact and further minimizes wound adhesion. Also, it can be impregnated with a thick, creamy mixture of zinc oxide and calamine to promote healing, as in Unna's boot. Gauze is also used during procedures involving accidental tooth loss; either the gauze is used to provide pressure as the tooth is moved back into its corresponding socket, or the tooth is wrapped in gauze and placed in milk or saline to keep it alive while the tooth is being transported and prepared for re-insertion.

=== Other uses ===
Gauze used in bookbinding is called mull, and is used in case binding to adhere the text block to the book cover.

The term wire gauze is used for woven metal sheets, for example placed on top of a Bunsen burner, or used in a safety lamp or a screen spark arrestor.

== See also ==
- Adhesive bandage
- Lacebark or gauze tree
- List of English words of Arabic origin
- Leno weave
- Majdalawi weaving
- Mesh
