= Marquisette =

Lightweight, transparent fabric

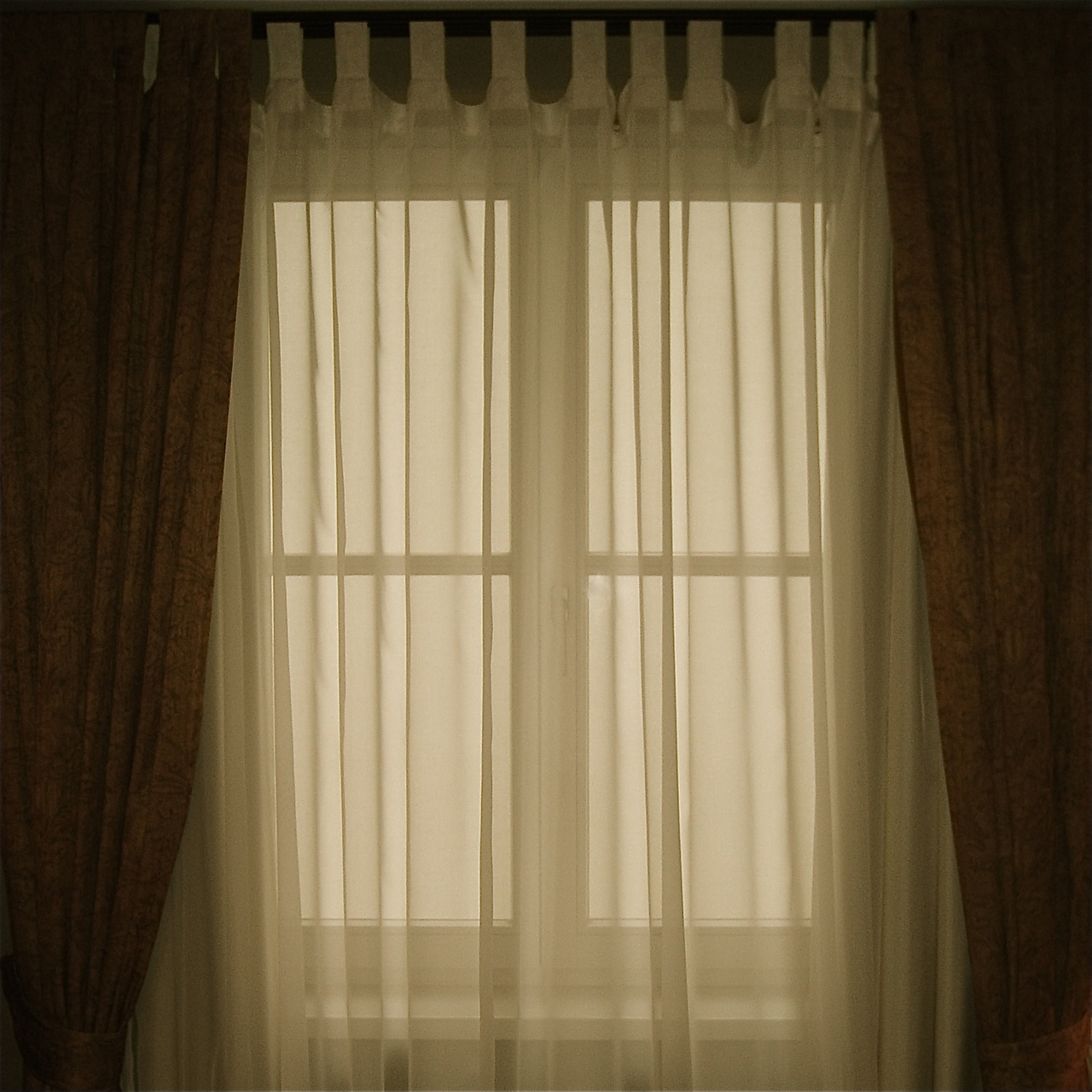
Translucent curtains hung on a window.

Marquisette is a lightweight, sheer fabric that has a structure similar to a mosquito net.

== Construction ==
Marquisette is a very loose weave construction plain and sometimes with designs. Leno is one type of weaving the marquisette. Marquisette may be made with many natural or synthetic yarns, and the most common is nylon. The other variants are possible with cotton, silk, rayon, orlon and polyester.

== Use ==
Marquisette is employed in certain undergarments, and is seen in dresses such as bridal wear and evening wear. It can commonly be seen in sheer draperies and curtains.

== See also ==
- Ninon
- Voile
