= Leno weave =

Weave in which two warp yarns are twisted around the weft yarns

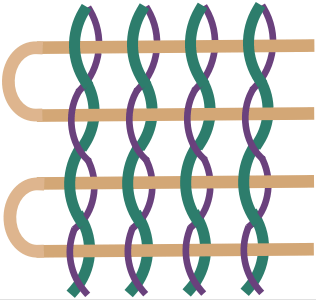
Basic leno weave

Leno weave (also called gauze weave or cross weave) is a weave in which two warp yarns are woven around the weft yarns to provide a strong yet sheer fabric. The standard warp yarn is paired with a skeleton or 'doup' yarn; these twisted warp yarns grip tightly to the weft which causes the durability of the fabric. Leno weave produces an open fabric with almost no yarn slippage or misplacement of threads.

== Uses ==
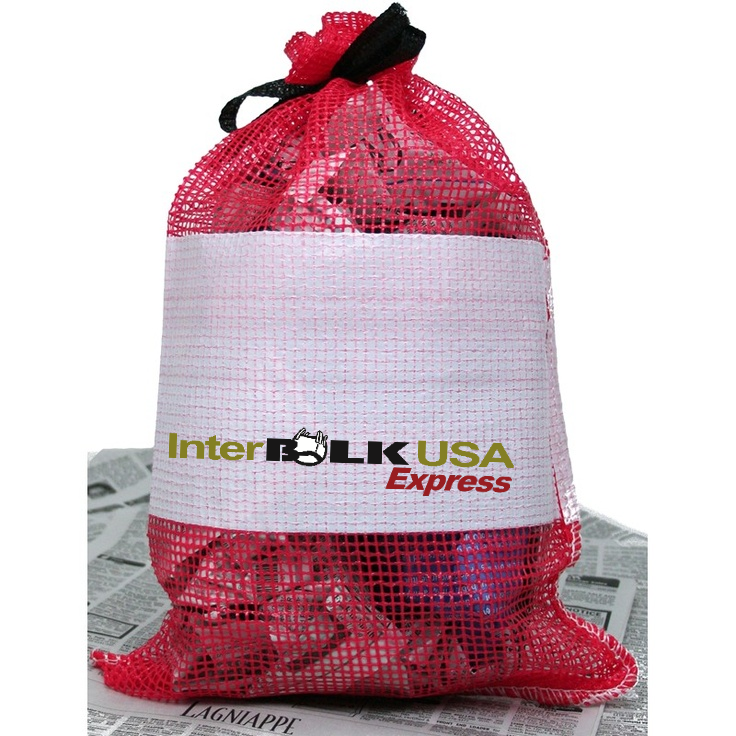
Woven leno mesh bag for shellfish, firewood and produce.

Leno weave fabric, which allows light and air to pass through freely, is used in any area where a sheer, open weave fabric that will not bruise (where the threads shift away from their original positions, disturbing the uniformity of the weave) is required. If a simple in-and-out plain weave was woven very loosely to achieve a sheer fabric, the threads would tend towards this bruising. Leno weaves are often used for window treatments and for sheer layers for fine clothing. When made with glass fibre or other strong yarns or when permeated with a strengthening compound, it can be used as an engineering material in construction. Due to the openness of the fabric, if a solid covering is required in a construction context, it is often used in conjunction with other weave styles.

Items made from leno woven fabric include:

- Produce bags - onions, potatoes, cabbage
- Shellfish bags - oysters, mussels and clams
- Firewood bags
- Curtains and drapery
- Mosquito netting
- Clothing

== Production ==
To produce a leno weave, the loom is threaded with the warp yarn and a doup yarn together. The doup yarn can be of similar or lesser weight and strength. The weft is woven in and for each weft shuttle the warp yarns are twisted interchangeably to produce a figure eight pattern.

== Karamiori ==
Karamiori (絡織り/搦み織り, "entangled weave", stemming from the verb karamu, "to entangle") refers to a category of Japanese leno weaves that encompass a number of techniques and resulting fabrics. Karamiori is a very old textile production method, believed to have originated some time in the Nara period, introduced to Japan from mainland Asia.

There are three basic types of karamiori used in Japan: ro (絽), sha (紗) and ra (羅). 'Ro' refers to a plain- or twill-weave fabric with interspersed horizontal leno-weave stripes; sha is an entirely leno-weave fabric; and ra combines the concept of twisted warp threads with a far more open weaving structure, creating patterns in the warp that appear similar to those seen in crochet and lace. Other varieties, such as tate-ro ("vertical ro") are also seen, though less commonly; all three fabrics are typically seen in kimono and obi suitable to be worn in the summer.
