= Alexis Kirk =

American jewelry designer

- Kirk in 1970 wearing a necklace of his own design.
- Born: 29 December 1936; Los Angeles
- Died: 17 May 2010 (aged 73); New York City
- Education: Harvard University, Rhode Island School of Design
- Known for: Jewelry and fashion accessory design
- Spouse: Hope Sands (1971-1973, divorced)

Alexis Kirk (29 December 1936 – 17 May 2010) was an American jewelry designer who also designed clothing and fashion accessories.

== Early life ==
Kirk, although born in Los Angeles, and brought up in New England, self-identified as Armenian. His father, Paul Kirk, was an artist for Walt Disney, and his grandfather, Charles Vemyan, worked as a glass craftsman for René Lalique. Some of Alexis's grandfather's jewelry is reportedly preserved in the Topkapi Palace in Istanbul.

Alexis Kirk studied art under Walter Gropius at Harvard University, and also attended the Rhode Island School of Design before becoming a lecturer in painting, sculpture and music at the University of Tennessee.

== Jewelry ==
Alexis Kirk's first design, which he personally wore, was a collar of Islamic glass beads and assorted charms, typical of his early work which featured amulets and symbols drawn from cultures and religions around the world, including the hamsa, Indian Paisley motifs, and Chinese fish. Kirk was very superstitious, with a strong interest in the occult and spirituality, which was reflected in his work. He started out with a small studio in Newport, Tennessee, selling jewelry to clients such as the Senator's wife. This led to a contract to design a budget-priced line of jewelry for the Hattie Carnegie company, which was a commercial failure. Following this, Kirk decided to move to New York to set up business there.

His first jewelry collection won him a Coty American Fashion Critics' Award. The following year in 1971, he diversified into clothing design, designing garments as a backdrop to his jewelry. His first fashion collection was based upon medieval designs, with tunics over hooded metallic bodystockings suggesting chainmail.

His work, in addition to spiritual, occult, and ethnic influences, used materials such as exotic woods, pewter and plastic alongside more traditional metals and stones in silhouettes based upon organic human and animal forms. The Duchess of Windsor, who said "I am absolutely fascinated by fake jewellery[...]; I think it is so good", owned a number of pieces by Kirk made from cork, wood, feathers, faux lapis lazuli and gilt metal. Kirk's work was always designed on a large scale, the designer favouring sculptural designs in striking shapes and materials which made a statement.

Kirk continued designing through the 1980s, specialising in accessories and belts. In 1988 he received an award from the Dallas Fashion Awards.

His famous clients, alongside the Duchess of Windsor, included Cher and Jacqueline Kennedy Onassis. Kirk's elephant themed designs, made since 1972, were worn during the 1980s by the wives of Republican leaders, Nancy Reagan and Barbara Bush, although the designer was a registered Democrat.

Before his death, Kirk was the owner of a retail organization called Dream Diamonds Online.

== Personal life ==
Kirk married Hope Sands, a client's daughter, in 1971, with whom he had two daughters, Lisa and Alexia. They were divorced in 1973. He died on 17 May 2010.

== Filmography ==
Year	Title	Role	Notes
1974	Seizure	Arris	
